= List of awards and nominations received by Noah Baumbach =

Noah Baumbach awards and nominations
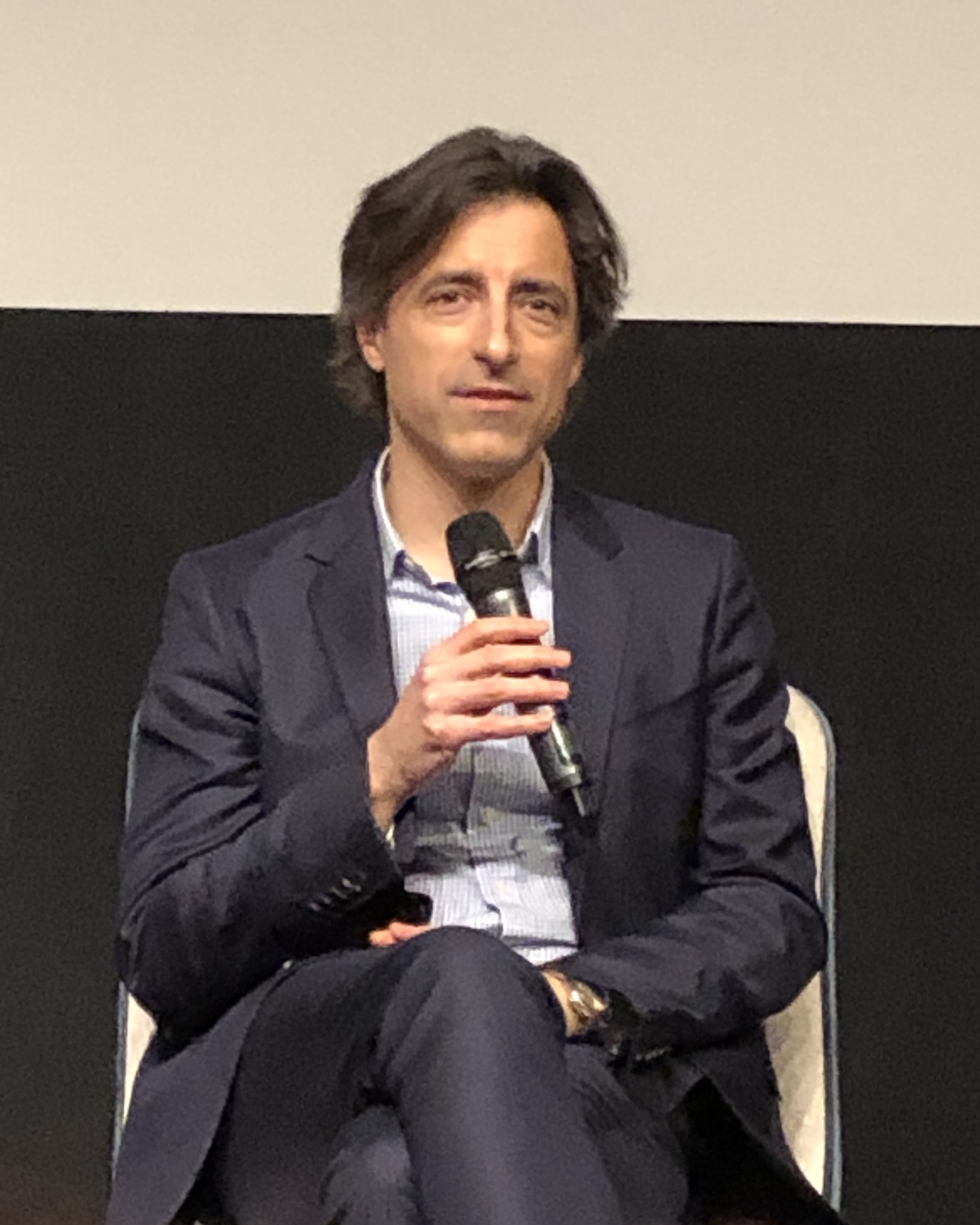
- Baumbach in 2020
Awards and nominations
Award	Wins	Nominations
Academy Awards	0	4
BAFTA Awards	0	2
Critics' Choice	1	7
Golden Globes	0	2

Totals (Note: Certain award groups do not simply award one winner. They acknowledge several different recipients, have runners-up, and have third place. Since this is a specific recognition and is different from losing an award, runner-up mentions are considered wins in this award tally. For simplification and to avoid errors, each award in this list has been presumed to have had a prior nomination.)
- Wins: 3
- Nominations: 47

Noah Baumbach is an American writer, director, and filmmaker. Baumbach is known for writing and directing several independent comedy-dramas set in New York City and his collaborations with Wes Anderson and Greta Gerwig. He has received a Critics' Choice Movie Award and two Independent Spirit Awards as well as nominations for four Academy Awards, two BAFTA Awards, and two Golden Globe Awards. His films have competed at the Berlin Film Festival, the Cannes Film Festival, the Sundance Film Festival, and the Venice Film Festival.

Baumbach gained his awards breakthrough and critical acclaim when he directed the semi-autobiographical dramedy film The Squid and the Whale (2005) for which he was nominated for the Academy Award for Best Original Screenplay. He directed the drama Greenberg (2010) which competed for the Cannes Film Festival's Palme d'Or. During this time he became known for his collaborations as a co-writer with filmmaker Wes Anderson starting with the adventure comedy-drama The Life Aquatic with Steve Zissou (2004), followed by the stop-motion animated children's film Fantastic Mr. Fox (2009), the later of which earned them nominations for the Critics' Choice Movie Award for Best Adapted Screenplay.

He returned to directing with the coming-of-age comedy Frances Ha (2013), which would be his first writing collaboration with Greta Gerwig. The film was nominated for the Independent Spirit Award for Best Film. He directed the family drama The Meyerowitz Stories (2017) which competed for the Palme d'Or at the 2017 Cannes Film Festival. With his drama Marriage Story (2019), it premiered and competed for the Venice International Film Festival's Golden Lion. Baumbach received wins for the Independent Spirit Award for Best Screenplay and the Robert Altman Award as well as nominations for the Academy Award, the BAFTA Award and the Golden Globe Award for Best Screenplay.

With his adaptation of the Don DeLillo absurdist tale White Noise (2021), it competed for the Golden Lion at the 79th Venice International Film Festival. He returned to collaborating with his partner Greta Gerwig with the comedy Barbie which they co-wrote together. The film was a cultural phenomenon and box office sensation and became the highest-grossing films of 2023. As a couple, Baumbach and Gerwig received the Critics' Choice Movie Award for Best Original Screenplay and were nominated for the Academy Award for Best Adapted Screenplay, the BAFTA Award for Best Original Screenplay, the Golden Globe Award for Best Screenplay, and the Writers Guild of America Award for Best Original Screenplay.

== Awards and nominations ==
=== Academy Awards ===
Year	Category	Nominated work	Result	Ref.
2005	Best Original Screenplay	The Squid and the Whale	Nominated	
2019	Best Picture	Marriage Story	Nominated	
2019	Best Original Screenplay	Marriage Story	Nominated	
2023	Best Adapted Screenplay	Barbie	Nominated	

=== BAFTA Awards ===
Year	Category	Nominated work	Result	Ref.
2019	Best Original Screenplay	Marriage Story	Nominated	
2023	Best Original Screenplay	Barbie	Nominated	

=== Critics' Choice Awards ===
Year	Category	Nominated work	Result	Ref.
Critics' Choice Movie Awards
2005	Best Screenplay	The Squid and the Whale	Nominated	
2009	Best Adapted Screenplay	Fantastic Mr. Fox	Nominated	
2019	Best Director	Marriage Story	Nominated	
2019	Best Original Screenplay	Marriage Story	Nominated	
2024	Best Original Screenplay	Barbie	Won	
2026	Best Original Screenplay	Jay Kelly	Nominated	

=== Golden Globe Awards ===
Year	Category	Nominated work	Result	Ref.
2019	Best Screenplay	Marriage Story	Nominated	
2023	Best Screenplay	Barbie	Nominated	

== Miscellaneous awards ==
Organizations	Year	Category	Work	Result	Ref.
Berlin International Film Festival	2010	Golden Bear	Greenberg	Nominated	
Cannes Film Festival	2017	Palme d'Or	The Meyerowitz Stories	Nominated	
Capri Hollywood International Film Festival	2023	Best Original Screenplay	Barbie	Won	
Gotham Awards	2007	Best Feature	Margot at the Wedding	Nominated	
Gotham Awards	2015	Best Screenplay	While We're Young	Nominated	
Gotham Awards	2019	Best Feature	Marriage Story	Won	
Gotham Awards	2019	Best Screenplay	Marriage Story	Won	
Gotham Awards	2019	Audience Award	Marriage Story	Won	
Independent Spirit Awards	2005	Best Director	The Squid and the Whale	Nominated	
Independent Spirit Awards	2013	Best Film	Frances Ha	Nominated	
Independent Spirit Awards	2019	Best Film	Marriage Story	Nominated	
Independent Spirit Awards	2019	Best Screenplay	Marriage Story	Won	
Independent Spirit Awards	2019	Robert Altman Award for Ensemble	Marriage Story	Won	
Producers Guild of America Awards	2019	Outstanding Producer of Theatrical Motion Pictures	Marriage Story	Nominated	
Sundance Film Festival	2005	Grand Jury Prize	The Squid and the Whale	Nominated	
Sundance Film Festival	2005	Directing Prize	The Squid and the Whale	Won	
Sundance Film Festival	2005	Waldo Salt Screenwriting Prize	The Squid and the Whale	Won	
Venice International Film Festival	2019	Golden Lion	Marriage Story	Nominated	
Venice International Film Festival	2022	Golden Lion	White Noise	Nominated	
Venice International Film Festival	2025	Golden Lion	Jay Kelly	Nominated	
Writers Guild of America Awards	2005	Best Original Screenplay	The Squid and the Whale	Nominated	
Writers Guild of America Awards	2019	Best Original Screenplay	Marriage Story	Nominated	
Writers Guild of America Awards	2023	Best Original Screenplay	Barbie	Nominated	

== Critics awards ==
Organizations	Year	Category	Work	Result	Ref.
National Society of Film Critics	2005	Best Screenplay	The Squid and the Whale	Won	
New York Film Critics Circle	1995	Best First Film	Kicking & Screaming	Nominated	
New York Film Critics Circle	2005	Best Screenplay	The Squid and the Whale	Won	
Los Angeles Film Critics Association	2005	Best Screenplay	The Squid and the Whale	Won	
Los Angeles Film Critics Association	2019	Best Screenplay	Marriage Story	Won	

== Directed Academy Award performances ==
Baumbach has directed multiple nominated performances.

Year	Performer	Film	Result
Academy Award for Best Actor
2019	Adam Driver	Marriage Story	Nominated
Academy Award for Best Actress
2019	Scarlett Johansson	Marriage Story	Nominated
Academy Award for Best Supporting Actress
2019	Laura Dern	Marriage Story	Won

== Critical reception ==
Year	Title	Rotten Tomatoes	Metacritic
1995	Kicking and Screaming	56% (36 reviews)	75 (18 reviews)
1997	Mr. Jealousy	71% (14 reviews)	61 (17 reviews)
2005	The Squid and the Whale	93% (150 reviews)	82 (37 reviews)
2007	Margot at the Wedding	51% (164 reviews)	66 (37 reviews)
2010	Greenberg	76% (174 reviews)	76 (39 reviews)
2013	Frances Ha	92% (192 reviews)	82 (35 reviews)
2014	While We're Young	84% (204 reviews)	77 (44 reviews)
2015	Mistress America	82% (186 reviews)	75 (41 reviews)
2017	The Meyerowitz Stories	92% (188 reviews)	80 (41 reviews)
2019	Marriage Story	95% (408 reviews)	94 (53 reviews)
2022	White Noise	64% (408 reviews)	66 (45 reviews)
2025	Jay Kelly	76% (219 reviews)	67 (50 reviews)
