= Highball (disambiguation) =

A highball is a type of alcoholic drink.

Highball may also refer to:

- Highball glass, glassware used to serve highball cocktails and other mixed drinks
- Highball (climbing), a climbing term for a very tall boulder problem
- Highball (film), 2002 comedy film by Noah Baumbach
- USS High Ball, the name of multiple US Navy ships
- Highball Wilson (1878-1934), professional baseball pitcher
- Highball, a 1942 British bouncing bomb project from World War 2
- An express train, historically called a 'highball'

== See also ==
- Lowball (disambiguation)
