= Sam Levy (cinematographer) =

American cinematographer

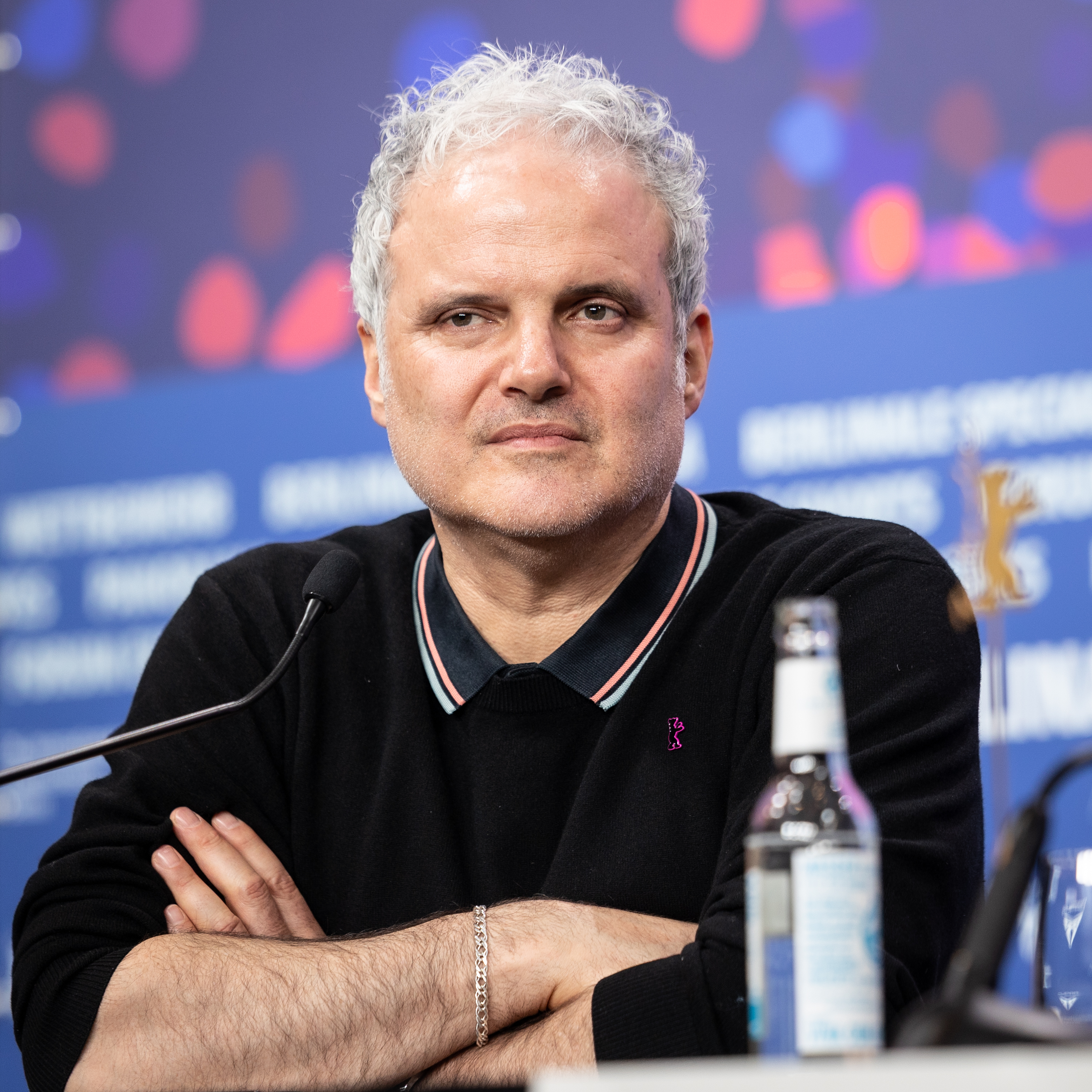
Sam Levy at the 2026 Berlin International Film Festival

Sam Levy is an American cinematographer. He is best known for shooting the films Lady Bird for director Greta Gerwig, Frances Ha for director Noah Baumbach, Wendy and Lucy for director Kelly Reichardt, Rothaniel for director Bo Burnham, and Mayday for director Karen Cinorre, to whom he is also married.

== Career ==
Levy began his career as an assistant to legendary cinematographer Harris Savides. Savides later introduced Sam to Noah Baumbach, who hired him to be the cinematographer for his film Frances Ha.

Levy first gained recognition as a cinematographer when he photographed Wendy and Lucy for director Kelly Reichardt — voted “One of the Best 25 Films of the 21st Century” by The New York Times.

After Frances Ha, Levy's collaboration with Baumbach continued with the films While We're Young and Mistress America.

Levy first met Greta Gerwig while filming Frances Ha. After doing three films together with Gerwig as an actor and writer, Levy was asked to shoot her directorial debut Lady Bird. Their collaboration was very successful and the film was nominated for five Academy Awards including Best Picture. It won The Golden Globe award for Best Motion Picture, Musical or Comedy.

Mayday, a film which Levy photographed, was also his debut as producer. It was written and directed by Karen Cinorre and won Best Cinematography at The Raindance Film Festival in London.

Other films as cinematographer include Green Porno for director Isabella Rossellini, His Three Daughters for director Azazel Jacobs, Rothaniel for director Bo Burnham, Confess, Fletch for director Greg Mottola and She Came To Me for director Rebecca Miller.

== Selected filmography ==
- Wendy and Lucy - 2008 - cinematographer
- Green Porno - 2008 - cinematographer
- The Romantics - 2010 - cinematographer
- Frances Ha - 2012 - cinematographer
- While We're Young - 2014 - cinematographer
- Mistress America - 2015 - cinematographer
- Maggie's Plan - 2015 - cinematographer
- Lady Bird - 2017 - cinematographer
- Sermon on the Mount - 2019 - cinematographer
- Mayday - 2021 - cinematographer, producer
- Confess, Fletch – 2022 - cinematographer
- Jerrod Carmichael: Rothaniel - 2022 - cinematographer
- She Came to Me – 2023 - cinematographer
- His Three Daughters – 2023 - cinematographer
- Little Films - 2023 - cinematographer
- The Only Living Pickpocket in New York - 2026 - cinematographer
- Good Sex - 2026 - cinematographer

== Music videos ==
- "Black Tambourine" by Beck - 2005 - cinematographer
- "Sex Is Not the Enemy" by Garbage - 2005 - cinematographer
- "Do You Believe in Rapture" by Sonic Youth - 2006 - cinematographer
- "I Love It" by Kanye West and Lil Pump - 2018 - cinematographer
- "Sunflower" by Vampire Weekend - 2019 - cinematographer

== Awards and nominations ==
- Emerging Cinematographer Award, 2003
- Filmmaker Magazine’s Favorite Cinematography, Wendy and Lucy 2008
- Variety, voted one of Variety’s “Up Next 25”, 2013
- London Film Critics Circle, Technical Achievement of the Year (nominee), Frances Ha, 2014
- Indiewire, 15 Cinematographers to watch, 2015
- Satellite Award, Best Cinematography (nominee), Lady Bird, 2017
- Raindance Film Festival, Won Best Cinematography, Mayday, 2022
