= Steven Bernstein (filmmaker) =

American writer, director and cinematographer

- Born: Buffalo, New York, U.S.
- Occupations: Filmmaker, Screenwriter, Cinematographer
- Years active: 1986–present

Steven Bernstein, ASC, DGA, WGA is an American cinematographer, director, screenwriter and author. In 1992 he won the Best Artistic Contribution Award at the Tokyo International Film Festival for Like Water for Chocolate alongside Emmanuel Lubezki. He also won the Cannes Golden Lion for his work in commercials. His book Film Production (Focal Press) has been translated into several languages and at one time was the bestselling textbook about film making. Bernstein was a 2014 ASC nominee for the Outstanding Achievement in Cinematography in One-Hour Episodic Television Series Award for his work on Magic City. Bernstein is a regular contributor to SonyCine Magazine where he writes articles on various aspects of filmmaking. Bernstein is a regular subject matter expert for articles about screenwriting and filmmaking for Adobe creative hub.

Bernstein has directed shorts, music videos and television commercials, and has lectured widely. He made his directing feature film debut with 2014's Decoding Annie Parker (Helen Hunt, Samantha Morton, Aaron Paul), for which he was awarded The Alfred P. Sloan Award at the Hampton's International Film Festival. Bernstein's second feature, Last Call was released theatrically in the US on 25 November 2020. It is a surrealistic biopic about the final day of Alcoholic poet Dylan Thomas's life, starring John Malkovich, Rhys Ifans, Rodrigo Santoro, Romola Garai, Zosia Mamet, and Tony Hale, and which Bernstein wrote, produced, and directed. Bernstein's recent script commissions include; A Perfect Place, Angela and Althea and Last Resort

Since 2016 Bernstein has worked with members of the Greek government to expand the Greek film industry and attract international film and television production to Greece. Bernstein spearheaded an initiative to introduce a tax rebate as an incentive to film producers to shoot in Greece. The tax incentive bill was passed in August 2017 and became effective in February 2018. As part of his initiative, Bernstein is training 400 to 500 Greek film students a year and is building a state of the art film studio in Greece.

Bernstein has been featured as the subject of articles in many publications including American Cinematographer Magazine, MovieMaker Magazine, People Magazine, Playboy Magazine and Mancode Magazine.

Bernstein co-hosts the weekly podcast, Film Maker And Fan's Podcast with Vince Grimes, Executive Producer and the former head of creative at Google.

Bernstein's first novel GRQ (Fly on the Wall Press) was published on 3rd June 2025GRQ was awarded The Literary Titan Gold Book Award in August 2025 and won the 2025 American Writing Award for Best Fiction Novella and won the 2025 Best Thrillers Award for Best Domestic Thriller

== Personal life ==
Bernstein was born in Buffalo, New York, in 1958 to parents Charles Bernstein, M.D. and Sylvia Bernstein. He has a son Adam from his first marriage to Elizabeth Bernstein and currently resides with his partner the designer and film producer Carolyn Rodney.

== Filmography ==
Year	Title	Director	Writer	Producer	Notes
1992	No Head for Heights	Yes	No	No	TV short; Co-directed with Nicholas Wright
2013	Decoding Annie Parker	Yes	Yes	Yes	Also wrote the song "Falling Out of View"
2015	Last Call	Yes	Yes	Yes	
TBA	GRQ the Movie	Yes	Yes	Yes	

=== Cinematographer ===
==== Film ====
Year	Title	Director	Notes
1986	Smart Alec	Jim Wilson	With John Huneck
1986	The Passion of Remembrance	Maureen Blackwood; Isaac Julien	With Nina Kellgren
1989	Conspiracy	Chris Bernard	
1991	Like Water for Chocolate	Alfonso Arau	With Emmanuel Lubezki
1995	Moondance	Dagmar Hirtz	
1995	Kicking and Screaming	Noah Baumbach	
1996	Underworld	Roger Christian	
1996	Bulletproof	Ernest Dickerson	
1996	Curdled	Reb Braddock	
1997	Murder at 1600	Dwight H. Little	
1997	Mr. Jealousy	Noah Baumbach	
1997	Highball	Noah Baumbach	
1998	Half Baked	Tamra Davis	
1998	The Waterboy	Frank Coraci	
1999	The Wood	Rick Famuyiwa	
2000	More Dogs Than Bones	Michael Browning	
2000	Goodbye Casanova	Mauro Borrelli	
2001	Christmas in the Clouds	Kate Montgomery	
2001	The Forsaken	J. S. Cardone	
2001	Scary Movie 2	Keenen Ivory Wayans	
2001	Corky Romano	Rob Pritts	
2003	Monster	Patty Jenkins	
2004	White Chicks	Keenen Ivory Wayans	
2006	Behind the Smile	Damon Wayans	
2006	Little Man	Keenen Ivory Wayans	
2006	One Night with the King	Michael O. Sajbel	
2007	Tortured	Nolan Lebovitz	Direct-to-video
2009	Not Forgotten	Dror Soref	
2009	Love at First Hiccup	Barbara Topsøe-Rothenborg	
2020	Walkaway Joe	Tom Wright	

==== Television ====
Year	Title	Director	Notes
1991	4 Play	Phil Davis; Norman Hull	Episodes "Deptford Graffiti" and "Work!"
1991	The Diamond Brothers	Anthony Horowitz	Miniseries
1992	No Head for Heights	Himself; Nicholas Wright	TV short
1995	The Monroes	Rick Wallace; Vern Gillum; Michael Nankin; Michael W. Watkins; James Quinn	5 episodes
2000	Opposite Sex	Randy Zisk; Danny Leiner; Kenneth Fink	4 episodes
2005	Threshold	David S. Goyer	Episode "Trees Made of Glass: Part 1"
2006	The Jake Effect	Marc Buckland; Kevin Dowling; Rodman Flender	6 episodes
2013	Magic City	Terrence O'Hara; Simon Cellan Jones; David Petrarca	3 episodes

=== Other credits ===
First assistant director

- Three Kinds of Heat (1987)

2nd unit director

Year	Title	Note
2013	Magic City	Episode "The Sins of the Father"

Acting roles

Year	Title	Role
2006	Behind the Smile	British Reporter
2006	One Night with the King	Father of Esther
2009	Love at First Hiccup	Co-Host Cooking Show (Voice role)

== Awards ==
Year	Film	Position	Award	Organization
1992	Like Water for Chocolate	Cinematographer	(Won) Best Artistic Contribution Award (Shared with Emmanuel Lubezki)	Tokyo International Film Festival
2003	Monster	Cinematographer	(Won) Creative Ensemble Award	AFI
2013	Decoding Annie Parker	Director / Writer	(Nominated) Golden Space Needle Award - Best Film	Seattle International Film Festival
2013	Decoding Annie Parker	Director / Writer	(Won) Alfred P. Sloan Award Foundation Feature Film Prize in Science and Technology	Hampton's International Film Festival
2014	Magic City	Cinematographer	(Nominated) ASC Award - Outstanding Achievement in Cinematography in One-Hour Episodic Television Series	American Society of Cinematographers
2014	Decoding Annie Parker	Director / Writer	(Nominated) Leonardo's Horse - Best Directing	Milan International Film Festival
2014	Decoding Annie Parker	Director / Writer	(Nominated) Leonardo's Horse - Best Screenwriting (Shared with Adam Bernstein and Mike Moss)	Milan International Film Festival
