= USS High Ball =

USS High Ball has been the name of more than one United States Navy ship, and may refer to:

- USS High Ball (SP-947), a patrol boat in commission from 1917 to 1919
- USS High Ball (1905), also written Highball, a patrol boat briefly in commission during late 1918
