= Highball (film) =

1997 unfinished American film

- Film poster
- Directed by: Noah Baumbach
- Written by: Noah Baumbach; Carlos Jacott; Christopher Reed
- Produced by: Joel Castleberg
- Starring: Justine Bateman; Peter Bogdanovich; Chris Eigeman
- Cinematography: Steven Bernstein
- Edited by: J. Kathleen Gibson
- Production companies: Shoreline Entertainment; Kathy Morgan International
- Release date: April 2002
- Running time: 90 minutes
- Country: United States
- Language: English

Highball is a 2002 American comedy film directed by Noah Baumbach, and written by Baumbach, Carlos Jacott, and Christopher Reed. Shot in 1997, Highball was never completed to Baumbach's satisfaction and he ultimately abandoned it. In April 2002, a version of the film assembled by the producers was released on DVD against Baumbach's wishes. Upon release, the film was credited as having been directed by "Ernie Fusco" and written by "Jesse Carter" after being disowned by Baumbach and his co-writers.

== Plot ==
Newlyweds Diane and Travis decide to improve their social life by throwing parties in their Brooklyn apartment. Over the course of a year, the couple stages three events: a birthday party; a Halloween party; and a New Year's Eve party. The film explores how friendships and relationships are tested during each of these social gatherings.

== Cast ==
- Lauren Katz as Diane
- Christopher Reed as Travis
- Justine Bateman as Sandy
- Noah Baumbach as Philip
- Chris Eigeman as Fletcher
- Peter Bogdanovich as Frank
- Eric Stoltz as Darien
- Rae Dawn Chong as Herself
- Ally Sheedy as Herself
- Carlos Jacott as Felix
- John Lehr as Miles
- Dean Cameron as The Magician
- Annabella Sciorra as Molly
- Dean Wareham as Jessie

== Production ==
The film was shot over six days in 1997, financed with money added to Baumbach's previous film Mr. Jealousy, using the short ends from that production.

== Removal of credit ==
Baumbach has removed his credit for the film, explaining in an interview with The A.V. Club:

And it was a funny script. But it was just too ambitious. We didn't have enough time, we didn't finish it, it didn't look good, it was just a whole ... mess. [Laughs.] We couldn't get it done, and I had a falling out with the producer. He abandoned it, and I had no money to finish it, to go back and maybe get two more days or something. Then later, it was put out on DVD without my approval.

New York Magazine later noted:

"The film centers on a series of parties thrown by miserable Brooklynites Diane (Lauren Katz) and Travis (Christopher Reed), one of the most mismatched couples in Baumbach’s repertoire who, despite being the film’s protagonists, do not even appear on its VHS cover."

== Reception ==
Justin Remer at DVDTalk.com wrote, "Much like Paul Auster and Wayne Wang's Blue in the Face, which was a largely improvised lark that drafted off the production momentum of the much more polished film Smoke, Highball was shot in a week shortly after the production of Baumbach's Mr. Jealousy. Most of the cast is carried over, although the recognizable actors take a backseat to Baumbach's friends who filled the periphery of the (relatively) bigger film."

== Documentary ==
MVD Visual restored Highball from its original film elements, and created The Making Of Highball, a 75-minute feature-length documentary featurette ("A collection of Zoom interviews with a bunch of the actors, the producer, and the co-writer.") which includes interviews with Joel Kastelberg, Christopher Reed, Lauren Katz, John Lehr, Rae Dawn Chong, Peter Bogdanovich, and Dean Cameron, available on On Blu-ray and YouTube.

== Streaming ==
Highball streamed on Netflix, Plex, Hoopla, YouTube, Amazon, Google Play, and Vudu.
