= Last Call (2017 film) =

Dominion
- Official film poster
- Directed by: Steven Bernstein
- Written by: Steven Bernstein
- Produced by: Richard N. Gladstein; John Malkovich; Carolyn Rodney; Nolan Mcdonald; Sohrab Lutchmedial
- Starring: Rhys Ifans; Rodrigo Santoro; John Malkovich; Romola Garai; Zosia Mamet; Tony Hale
- Cinematography: Antal Steinbach
- Edited by: Zimo Huang; Chris Gill
- Music by: Steven Bramson
- Production company: FilmColony
- Release date: 2017
- Running time: 101 minutes
- Country: United States
- Language: English

Last Call (originally titled Dominion) is a 2017 American drama film written and directed by Steven Bernstein. It is a surrealistic biopic, which recreates the life of Welsh poet Dylan Thomas through flashbacks during the famous drinking binge at the White Horse Tavern in New York City which ended fatally during the fall of 1953.

The unfinished film was screened at the 2016 Rio de Janeiro International Film Festival. The worldwide sales rights were acquired by Lightning Entertainment in November 2017.

== Cast ==
- Rhys Ifans as Dylan Thomas
- Rodrigo Santoro as Carlos
- John Malkovich as Dr. Felton
- Romola Garai as Caitlin Thomas
- Zosia Mamet as Penelope
- Tony Hale as John Malcolm Brinnin
- Philip Ettinger as Alexi
- Jonathan Higgins as Julian
- Arthur Holden as Dean
- Ellen David as Dorothy
- Andrew Shaver as Reggie
- Jeremy Ferdman as Michael
- Noel Burton as Jeremy
- Guy Sprung as Felix
- Michael Riendeau as Colm Thomas
- Mike Paterson as Teddy

== Production ==
The film was shot in 2014. On May 1, 2014, Rhys Ifans, John Malkovich and Diego Luna joined the cast. On May 29, 2014, Rodrigo Santoro joined the cast. Principal photography began on May 23, 2014, and ended on June 23, 2014. Post-production was completed in January 2020.

The film ran into financial difficulties during the last week of filming when extras and technicians were not paid for the work they had done when the production ran out of money. Though producers insisted the crew would be paid, in 2015, extras and crew signed an open letter to Pierre Lescure, the president of the Cannes Film Festival, asking them to ban Dominion from being screened at the festival until they were paid, while the producers argued that the incomplete film would benefit from being shown at Cannes, where they could find investors.

== Reception ==
The unfinished film was very well reviewed at The Rio Film Festival. The Hollywood Reporter said: "Dominion's daring never becomes pretentiousness, and its sincere struggle to get to the heart of the endlessly fascinating Thomas myth — one with contemporary resonances, in its take on celebrity — finally makes the film as rewarding as it is uncomfortable..." ISTOE, one of Brazil's three leading magazines said: "Also worthy of an Oscar is Rhys Ifans in Steven Bernstein's Dominion." Luiz Carlos Merten for ESTADAO said: "Rhys Ifans' performance as the poet is Oscar worthy." and "Rodrigo (Santoro) could compete for best supporting." Plano Critico said: "Certainly one of the best films of the year" "Dominion is one of those films that leaves us completely in love with it, a cinematographic work with identity, both as textual imagery, which immerses us completely in this dizzying trajectory of Dylan Thomas."

A work in progress version of the film was also very well reviewed at The Tallinn Black Nights Film Festival. Aurelia Aasa, film critic for Postimees Culture said: "...one of the most aesthetically pleasing and poetic films at PÖFF this year..." Ben Nicholson of "Cine Vue" named "Dominion" as one of the Top Ten Picks of the festival and said: "a virtuoso performance from Ifans – he’s pompous, verbose, and charismatic."

== Awards ==
The unfinished film won the Best Actor award for Rhys Ifans's performance as Dylan Thomas at the 2017 POFF Tallinn Black Nights Film Festival. POFF Tallinn Black Nights Film Festival is the largest film festival in Northern Europe.
