= Frances Ha =

2012 film by Noah Baumbach

- Theatrical release poster
- Directed by: Noah Baumbach
- Written by: Noah Baumbach; Greta Gerwig
- Produced by: Noah Baumbach; Scott Rudin; Lila Yacoub; Rodrigo Teixeira
- Starring: Greta Gerwig; Mickey Sumner
- Cinematography: Sam Levy
- Edited by: Jennifer Lame
- Production companies: RT Features; Pine District Pictures; Scott Rudin Productions
- Distributed by: IFC Films
- Release dates: September 1, 2012 (Telluride Film Festival); May 17, 2013 (United States)
- Running time: 86 minutes
- Country: United States
- Language: English
- Budget: $3 million
- Box office: $11.3 million

Frances Ha is a 2012 American comedy drama film directed by Noah Baumbach. It is written by Baumbach and Greta Gerwig, who also stars as Frances, a struggling 27-year-old dancer whose career and social life begin imploding at the same time that her best friend's life begins taking off. The film premiered at the Telluride Film Festival on September 1, 2012, and was given a limited theatrical release in the United States on May 17, 2013, by IFC Films.

== Plot ==
After graduating from Vassar College, best friends Frances and Sophie move to Brooklyn. They dream of becoming successful creatives. Frances becomes an apprentice at a dance company and juggles gigs while she waits for an opening on the permanent corps de ballet. Sophie works in publishing.

At 27, Frances is still struggling to make it in New York. She breaks up with her boyfriend at the same time that Sophie announces that she is moving to Tribeca, a more upscale neighborhood, with a different (and presumably richer) friend. Although Sophie assures Frances that they will remain friends, Frances is wounded. She rents a spare room in Chinatown with her friends Lev and Benji, two affluent creatives whose parents help pay their rent.

Frances and Sophie continue growing apart, both personally and lifestyle-wise. Sophie's boyfriend Patch is a well-paid Goldman Sachs employee, and Frances bitterly complains to Sophie that the latter's attention is shifting to Patch. By contrast, Frances's boss Colleen begins easing Frances out of the dance company, as the odds are low that Frances will ever make the permanent roster. She denies Frances a crucial Christmas gig, which Frances needs to pay her rent. Frances moves out of Lev and Benji's apartment.

Frances goes home to Sacramento for Christmas. She finds home warm but confining and unglamorous, and returns to New York. She briefly stays with her coworker Rachel, but their personalities clash.

Frances learns that Patch has been offered a promotion and a move to Goldman's Tokyo office, and that Sophie is quitting her job to be with him. Although the move is in just two weeks, Sophie still has not told Frances. To feel better about herself, Frances impulsively flies to Paris for the weekend. She plans the trip poorly, and does not get much from the experience. During the trip, Sophie belatedly calls Frances to tell her about the move but Frances's wounds are still fresh.

Colleen offers Frances an office job and suggests that Frances switch from dancing to choreography. Offended, Frances lies that she is getting work at a different dance company. She returns to Vassar to work as a waitress and summer resident assistant. She finds the work embarrassing, and enviously reads Sophie's blog of her life in Tokyo.

One night, Frances runs into Sophie and Patch while waitressing at an alumni fundraiser. Although Sophie and Patch are now engaged, they are not happy. Sophie drunkenly insults Patch in public and asks to stay with Frances for the night. Sophie admits to Frances that she dislikes Japan and wants to break up with Patch. She adds that she suffered a miscarriage and felt relieved about it. The next morning, Sophie explains that she was drunk and that she will, in fact, be returning to Japan with Patch. A devastated Frances watches Sophie drive away.

Some time later, Frances accepts Colleen's office job and enjoys a modest but satisfying existence as a fledgling choreographer. She manages to get her own apartment in Manhattan, albeit in Washington Heights instead of Tribeca. She is on reasonably good terms with Sophie, whom she still calls her best friend.

Frances moves into her apartment. To mark her new mailbox, she writes her name, Frances Halladay, onto a slip of paper. Her full last name does not fit in the mailbox slot, so she folds the paper to read: "Frances Ha".

== Cast ==
- Greta Gerwig as Frances Halladay
- Mickey Sumner as Sophie Levee
- Adam Driver as Lev Shapiro
- Michael Zegen as Benji
- Patrick Heusinger as Reade "Patch" Krause
- Michael Esper as Dan
- Charlotte d'Amboise as Colleen
- Grace Gummer as Rachel
- Josh Hamilton as Andy
- Maya Kazan as Caroline
- Justine Lupe as Nessa
- Britta Phillips as Nadia
- Juliet Rylance as Janelle
- Dean Wareham as Spencer

== Production ==
Frances Ha was directed by Noah Baumbach, and written by Baumbach and Greta Gerwig. Gerwig, who also stars in the film, announced it in April 2012, though Baumbach's involvement was not revealed until the film's listing in the Telluride Film Festival's lineup. Gerwig had starred in Baumbach's 2010 film Greenberg, and they decided to collaborate again. They exchanged ideas, developed characters and eventually co-wrote the script. Gerwig has said that she did not anticipate starring in the film as well, but Baumbach thought she suited the part. Filming locations included New York City, Sacramento, Paris and at Vassar College in Poughkeepsie, Baumbach's alma mater.

Gerwig cited Joseph Conrad's novella The Shadow-Line and Woody Allen's film Annie Hall (1977) as inspirations for the film. Baumbach and Gerwig also have cited the films of the French New Wave and Woody Allen as influences, as well as Something Wild (1986) and Lost in America (1985) which they watched during the production.

In the bonus features on the home-video release, the filmmakers said that the film was shot in the style of French New Wave cinema, with the tools of a student filmmaker. Even though the production had both the budget for and access to professional-level cinema cameras and lenses, they chose to use the Canon EOS 5D Mark II, a consumer-grade photographic camera that can record high-definition video. Instead of adapting professional cinema lenses, as other cinematographers have done when working with that camera, they used Canon L-series EF prime and zoom lenses designed for still photography. They mostly used a 50mm prime lens and a 70–200mm zoom lens, rarely employing 35mm and 85mm prime lenses because they lacked the mechanics and features common among cinema lenses (when paired with the camera’s large full-frame sensor, they make it difficult to maintain focus). By using a very small camera and extremely limited lighting equipment, the production could quickly and easily move locations without attracting much attention. Without large crews, elaborate sets, and special visual effects, the production could afford to shoot around the world on a fairly limited budget.

== Soundtrack ==
The filmmakers included a number of pop songs in the film, including "Every 1's a Winner" by Hot Chocolate, "Blue Sway" by Paul McCartney, "Chrome Sitar" by T.Rex, and "Modern Love" by David Bowie. "Modern Love" is featured in a scene in Frances Ha that is a remake of a sequence in Leos Carax's Mauvais Sang, where Denis Lavant runs through the streets.

The soundtrack includes a song by Felix Laband and references multiple French films; it contains music by Georges Delerue, Jean Constantin and Antoine Duhamel, who originally wrote for films of the French New Wave.

== Release ==
Frances Ha premiered at the Telluride Film Festival on September 1, 2012. The Los Angeles Times said "audiences seemed pleasantly surprised by the warmth from the often-mordant Baumbach." The film also screened at the Toronto International Film Festival on September 7, 2012, after which IFC Films acquired North and Latin American rights to distribute the film in theaters. Frances Ha also screened at the New York Film Festival on September 30, 2012, and at the Edinburgh International Film Festival in June 2013.

The film had a limited release in the United States on May 17, 2013, and was released on Blu-ray and DVD on the Criterion Collection label on November 12, 2013.

== Reception ==
=== Critical response ===
The review aggregation website Rotten Tomatoes gives Frances Ha a 92% approval rating based on 192 reviews, with an average score of 7.80/10. The website's critical consensus is: "Audiences will need to tolerate a certain amount of narrative drift, but thanks to sensitive direction from Noah Baumbach and an endearing performance from Greta Gerwig, Frances Ha makes it easy to forgive." Metacritic calculated an average score of 82 out of 100 based on 35 reviews, indicating "universal acclaim".

Stephanie Zacharek of The Village Voice praised Gerwig's performance, writing, "It's a relief that Frances Ha isn't as assertively frank, in the 'Look, ma, no shame!' way, as Girls. And this is partly Gerwig's vision, too. No other movie has allowed her to display her colors like this. Frances is a little dizzy and frequently maddening, but Gerwig is precise in delineating the character's loopiness: Her lines always hit just behind the beat, like a jazz drummer who pretends to flub yet knows exactly what's up".

Peter Debruge, reviewing for Variety, described Frances Ha: "This modest monochromatic lark doesn't present a story—or even a traditional sequence of scenes—so much as it offers spirited glimpses into the never-predictable life of Frances, a 27-year-old dancer." He said Frances was "a character whose unexceptional concerns and everyday foibles prove as compelling as any New York-set concept picture, delivering an affectionate, stylishly black-and-white portrait of a still-unfledged Gotham gal". Sarah Galo of Mic also noted that Frances Ha “is really quite daring in its portrayal of female friendship. Frances and Sophie go through the motions of being BFFs to breaking up to being reunited in the end.”

The Los Angeles Times highlighted Gerwig's foray as part of a trend of female actors becoming writers or co-writers; other examples include Zoe Kazan with Ruby Sparks and Rashida Jones with Celeste and Jesse Forever. Baumbach filmed Frances Ha with his cinematographer Sam Levy digitally and in black-and-white, the latter to emulate, in part, collaborations by Woody Allen and his cinematographer Gordon Willis, in films like Manhattan (1979). CBS News compared Frances Ha's style to the works of Woody Allen, Jim Jarmusch and François Truffaut.

In 2015, it was included on Olivier Assayas' list of his 10 favorite film for Criterion Collection. In 2025 it ranked number 90 on The New York Times' list of "The 100 Best Movies of the 21st Century" and was one of the films voted for the "Readers' Choice" edition of the list, finishing at number 125.

=== Accolades ===
Year	Category	Nominee	Result	Ref.
Golden Globe Awards	Best Actress – Comedy or Musical	Greta Gerwig	Nominated	
Independent Spirit Awards	Best Feature	Frances Ha	Nominated	
Independent Spirit Awards	Best Editing	Jennifer Lame	Nominated	
Broadcast Film Critics Association Awards	Best Actress in a Comedy	Greta Gerwig	Nominated	
British Independent Film Awards	Best International Independent Film	Frances Ha	Nominated	
London Film Critics Circle Film Awards	Film of the Year	Frances Ha	Nominated	
London Film Critics Circle Film Awards	Actress of the Year	Greta Gerwig	Nominated	
London Film Critics Circle Film Awards	Technical Achievement	Sam Levy	Nominated	
Toronto Film Critics Association Awards	Best Actress	Greta Gerwig	2nd Runner-up	
Casting Society of America	Casting - Low Budget Feature	Douglas Aibel; Henry Russell Bergstein	Nominated	
IndieWire Critics Poll	Best Film	Frances Ha	10th Place	
IndieWire Critics Poll	Best Lead Performance	Greta Gerwig	Nominated	
IndieWire Critics Poll	Best Screenplay	Noah Baumbach; Greta Gerwig	Nominated	
Central Ohio Film Critics Association	Best Picture	Frances Ha	Nominated	
Central Ohio Film Critics Association	Best Actress	Greta Gerwig	Nominated	
Bodil Awards	Best American Film	Frances Ha	Nominated	
Tallinn Black Nights Film Festival	Audience Award	Noah Baumbach	3rd place	
Vancouver Film Critics Circle	Best Actress	Greta Gerwig	Nominated	

== See also ==
- List of black-and-white films produced since 1966
