= Crazy Little Thing =

2002 film by Matthew Miller

- DVD cover
- Directed by: Matthew Miller
- Written by: Matthew Miller
- Starring: Chris Eigeman; Jenny McCarthy
- Cinematography: Michael Barrett
- Edited by: John Gilroy
- Music by: Mocean Worker
- Distributed by: Screen Media Films
- Release date: March 1, 2002
- Running time: 90 minutes
- Country: United States
- Language: English

Crazy Little Thing (also known as The Perfect You) is a 2002 romantic comedy film written and directed by Matthew Miller. The film stars Chris Eigeman and Jenny McCarthy.

After the September 11th attacks, the shots of the World Trade Center remained in the film.

== Cast ==
- Chris Eigeman as Jimmy
- Jenny McCarthy as Whitney Ann Barnsley III
- Drea de Matteo as Dee, Whitney's Neighbour
- Paul Dooley as Jimmy's Dad
- Josh Stamberg as Eddie Oshinski
- Alanna Ubach as Wendy
- Aubrey Dollar as Gina Vosola
- Dennis Boutsikaris as Dr. Levy
- Joelle Carter as Kate
- Brian Anthony Wilson as Phil
