= Carlos Jacott =

American actor (born 1967)

- Born: July 28, 1967 (age 59)
- Occupation: Actor
- Years active: 1995–present

Carlos Jacott (born July 28, 1967) is an American actor.

== Career ==
He has guest-starred in numerous television series, such as Seinfeld, Firefly, CSI: Crime Scene Investigation, Buffy the Vampire Slayer, Angel, and Studio 60 on the Sunset Strip. He has starred in films, such as Kicking and Screaming, Mr. Jealousy, Being John Malkovich, The Last Days of Disco, Grosse Pointe Blank, and Fun with Dick and Jane.

== Filmography ==
Film
Year	Title	Role	Notes
1995	Kicking and Screaming	Otis	
1997	Highball	Felix	Also writer
1997	Grosse Pointe Blank	Ken Aldridge	
1997	Mr. Jealousy	Vince	
1997	Angry Boy		Short
1998	The Last Days of Disco	Dog Walker	
1998	The Real Howard Spitz	Door Guard	
1999	She's All That	Prom Photographer	
1999	Being John Malkovich	Larry the Agent	
1999	Bats	Dr. Tobe Hodge	
2000	Conrad & Butler Take a Vacation	Conrad	Short; also writer
2000	It’s a Shame About Ray	Ray	Short
2000	Attention Shoppers	Duncan Baird	
2003	Harold Buttleman, Daredevil Stuntman	Dwayne Perkins	
2003	The Movie Hero	Jonathan/The Doomed Fiancé	
2004	Jiminy Glick in Lalawood	Barry King	
2005	Guilt	The Doctor	Short
2005	Fun with Dick and Jane	Oz Peterson	
2010	Get Him to the Greek	Navigator Driver in Vegas	
2017	The Meyerowitz Stories	Town Car Driver	
2019	Marriage Story	TV Show Producer	
2022	White Noise	Grappa	
2023	Barbie	Policeman	
2024	Omni Loop	Donald Lowe	
2025	Jay Kelly	Gordon	
2026	Misty Green	Hal	

Television
Year	Title	Role	Notes
1995–1998	Seinfeld	Ramon, the Pool Guy	2 episodes
1996	The Home Court	Pete	Episode: "Touched by an Anger"
1996	Hudson Street	Richard Franklin	2 episodes
1996	Common Law	Peter Gutenhimmel	5 episodes
1996	Townies	Arnie	Episode: "Thanksgiving"
1997	Cracker: Mind Over Murder	Jim	Episode: "An American Dream"
1998	Principal Takes a Holiday	Oliver	Television film
1998	The Larry Sanders Show	Bill	Episode: "Pilots and Pens Lost"
1998	Since You've Been Gone	Ballroom Bartender	Television film
1998	Buffy the Vampire Slayer	Ken	Episode: "Anne"
1999	Angel	Richard Straley	Episode: "The Bachelor Party"
2000	Ally McBeal	Bob	Episode: "Just Friends"
2000	Thirty		Television film
2000	Frasier	Matt	Episode: "Morning Becomes Entertainment"
2001	Spin City	Lloyd	Episode: "The Perfect Dorm"
2001	These Old Broads	Tom	Television film
2001	3rd Rock from the Sun	Doctor/Dr. Schulman	2 episodes
2001	Dead Last	Dead Pilot	Episode: "Death Is in the Air"
2001	The West Wing	N.H. Marketing Guy #2	Episode: "Bartlet for America"
2002	Grounded for Life	Gary	Episode: "Let’s Talk About Sex, Henry"
2002	Firefly	Lawrence Dobson	Episode: "Serenity"
2002–2003	She Spies	Jack Wilde	20 episodes
2003	CSI: Crime Scene Investigation	Dr. Gardner	Episode: "Feeling the Heat"
2005	Curb Your Enthusiasm	Podiatrist	Episode: "The Christ Nail"
2006	Desperate Housewives	Gary Grantham	Episode: "Silly People"
2006	Studio 60 on the Sunset Strip	Ron Oswald	4 episodes
2006–2014	Psych	Various	4 episodes; also writer
2006–2011	Big Love	Carl Martin	13 episodes
2007	Two Families		Television film
2007	K-Ville	Phil Beatrice	Episode: "No Good Deed"
2007	Cavemen	Mr. Hogan	2 episodes
2007	Scrubs	Dr. No Shot	Episode: "My Hard Labor"
2008	Welcome to The Captain	Vin Kelso	Episode: "Mr. Big Meeting"
2008	CSI: Miami	Paul Evett	Episode: "All In"
2008	Eli Stone	Willie Matos	Episode: "Patience"
2008	Terminator: The Sarah Connor Chronicles	David Fields	Episode: "Alpine Fields"
2008	Ernesto	Bryce Cutler	Television film
2010–2011	Medium	Gary / Gary Durant	2 episodes
2011	The Mentalist	Mayor Kenyon Bagshaw	Episode: "Red Alert"
2014	2 Broke Girls	Mr. Huck	Episode: "And the First Degree"
2014	The Comeback	James	2 episodes
2016	Better Things	John	Episode: "Sam/Pilot"
2017	The Carmichael Show	Officer Greg Zimmerman	Episode: "Shoot-Up-Able"
2017	Psych: The Movie	Gus's Boss	Television film
2020	The George Lucas Talk Show	Himself	Episode: "Stu-D2 1138 on the Binary Sunset Sith"
