= Good Sex =

- Directed by: Lena Dunham
- Written by: Lena Dunham
- Produced by: Lena Dunham; Michael P. Cohen; Natalie Portman; Sophie Mas
- Starring: Natalie Portman; Mark Ruffalo; Tucker Pillsbury; Tramell Tillman; Rashida Jones; Meg Ryan
- Cinematography: Sam Levy
- Edited by: Mark Day
- Production companies: MountainA; Good Thing Going Productions
- Distributed by: Netflix
- Release date: 2026
- Country: United States
- Language: English

Good Sex is an upcoming American romantic comedy film written, produced and directed by Lena Dunham. It stars Natalie Portman, Mark Ruffalo, Tucker Pillsbury, Tramell Tillman, Rashida Jones, and Meg Ryan. The film will be released on Netflix in 2026.

== Premise ==
After spending a decade in a failed relationship, pragmatic couples’ therapist Ally is turning 40 and reluctantly dipping her toe back into the New York dating scene. But she gets more than she bargained for when she meets two men—one in his twenties and one in his fifties—who show her there is no set formula for good sex.

== Cast ==
- Natalie Portman as Ally
- Mark Ruffalo
- Tucker Pillsbury as Caleb
- Meg Ryan
- Rashida Jones
- Tramell Tillman

== Production ==
In February 2025, it was announced that a romantic comedy film written, produced and directed by Lena Dunham titled Good Sex was in development with Natalie Portman in the lead role. A bidding war immediately ensued, with Warner Bros. Pictures, Amazon MGM Studios, Apple Studios and Netflix among those actively bidding and offers for worldwide distribution rights reaching as high as $45 million. Netflix ultimately won the auction, acquiring the project for around $55 million. In May, Mark Ruffalo, Tucker Pillsbury, Meg Ryan and Rashida Jones joined the cast of the film. In July, it was reported that principal photography had begun in New York City, with Sam Levy serving as the cinematographer, and Tramell Tillman joining the cast. Filming wrapped on August 19.

== Release ==
Good Sex is scheduled to be released on Netflix in 2026.
