= Chris Eigeman =

American actor and film director

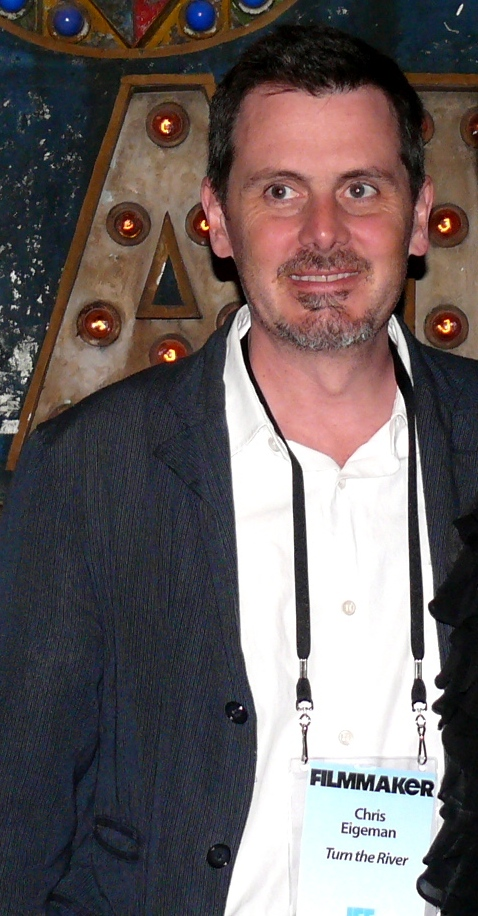
- Eigeman at the 2008 Independent Film Festival of Boston
- Born: Christopher Eigeman; March 1, 1965 (age 61); Denver, Colorado, U.S.
- Occupations: Actor; screenwriter; director; producer
- Spouse: Linda D. Eigeman (1993-present)
- Children: 1

Christopher Eigeman (born March 1, 1965) is an American actor and film director.

Eigeman is best known for roles in films written and directed by Whit Stillman: Metropolitan (1990), Barcelona (1994), and The Last Days of Disco (1998) as well as Noah Baumbach's Kicking and Screaming (1995), Mr. Jealousy, and Highball (both 1997). He also has made recurring appearances in Malcolm in the Middle, Gilmore Girls, Girls, and The Marvelous Mrs. Maisel.

== Early life ==
Eigeman was born in Denver, Colorado, in 1965. He attended The Putney School, Putney, Vermont, from 1979 to 1983, and graduated from Kenyon College, Gambier, Ohio, with a Bachelor of Arts in English and Theatre in 1987.

== Career ==
Eigeman has appeared in theatrical films including Kicking and Screaming (1995), Mr. Jealousy (1997), Highball (1997), Maid in Manhattan (2002), Crazy Little Thing (also known as The Perfect You) (2002), and The Treatment (2006).

Eigeman has appeared in television series including It's Like, You Know..., Gilmore Girls, Malcolm in Middle, Homicide: Life on the Street, Fringe, and Girls.

In 1992, Eigeman filmed a pilot for an American version of the British cult sci-fi television show Red Dwarf, playing the part of Arnold Rimmer; however, the show was not picked up as a series. During the mid-1990s, he appeared in a series of television advertisements for Pacific Bell that highlighted his sarcastic, straight-ahead delivery. In these spots, Eigeman always appeared in dark suit and tie, regardless of the situation.

Eigeman wrote and directed the film Turn the River (2007).

== Personal life ==
He has been married to Linda D. Eigeman since 1993. They have a son, born in 2008.

== Work ==
=== Film ===
Year	Title	Role	Notes
1990	Metropolitan	Nick Smith	
1994	Barcelona	Fred Boynton	
1995	Kicking and Screaming	Max Belmont	
1997	Highball	Fletcher	
1997	The Next Step	David	
1997	Mr. Jealousy	Dashiell Frank	also associate producer
1998	The Last Days of Disco	Des	
2002	The Next Big Thing	Gus Bishop	
2002	Crazy Little Thing	Jimmy	also known as The Perfect You
2002	Maid in Manhattan	John Bextrum	
2003	7 Songs	Micah	
2004	Clipping Adam	Tom Sheppard	
2006	The Treatment	Jake Singer	
2007	Turn the River	Mike Simms	also executive producer, writer, director
2012	Arbitrage	Gavin Briar	
2018	Seven in Heaven		Director, writer

=== Television ===
Year	Title	Role	Notes
1993	Red Dwarf USA	Rimmer	Unaired Television Pilot (1st Pilot)
1996	Homicide: Life on the Streets	Jude Silvio	Episode: The Heart of a Saturday Night
1999	The Outer Limits	Caleb Vance	1 episode
1999–2000	It's Like, You Know...	Arthur Garment	26 episodes
2001–05	Malcolm in the Middle	Lionel Herkabe	9 episodes
2002	Path to War	Bill Moyers	Television movie, HBO
2004	Gilmore Girls	Jason Stiles	13 episodes
2008	Fringe	David Esterbrook	Episode: The Cure
2009	CSI: Miami	Garrett Yates	Episode: Kill Clause
2012	Girls	Alistair	Episode: Pilot
2012	Bunheads	Conor	Episode 8: Blank Up, It's Time
2016	Gilmore Girls: A Year in the Life	Jason Stiles	Episode: "Winter"
2022	Billions	Stuart Legere	2 episodes
2022–23	The Marvelous Mrs. Maisel	Gabe	8 episodes

== Awards and nominations ==
Year	Award	Category	Project	Result
2007	Hamptons International Film Festival	Best Screenplay	Turn the River	Won
2009	Independent Spirit Awards	John Cassavetes Award	Turn the River	Nominated
2011	20/20 Awards	Best Supporting Actor	Metropolitan	Nominated
