= Eric Stoltz =

American actor, director and film producer (born 1961)

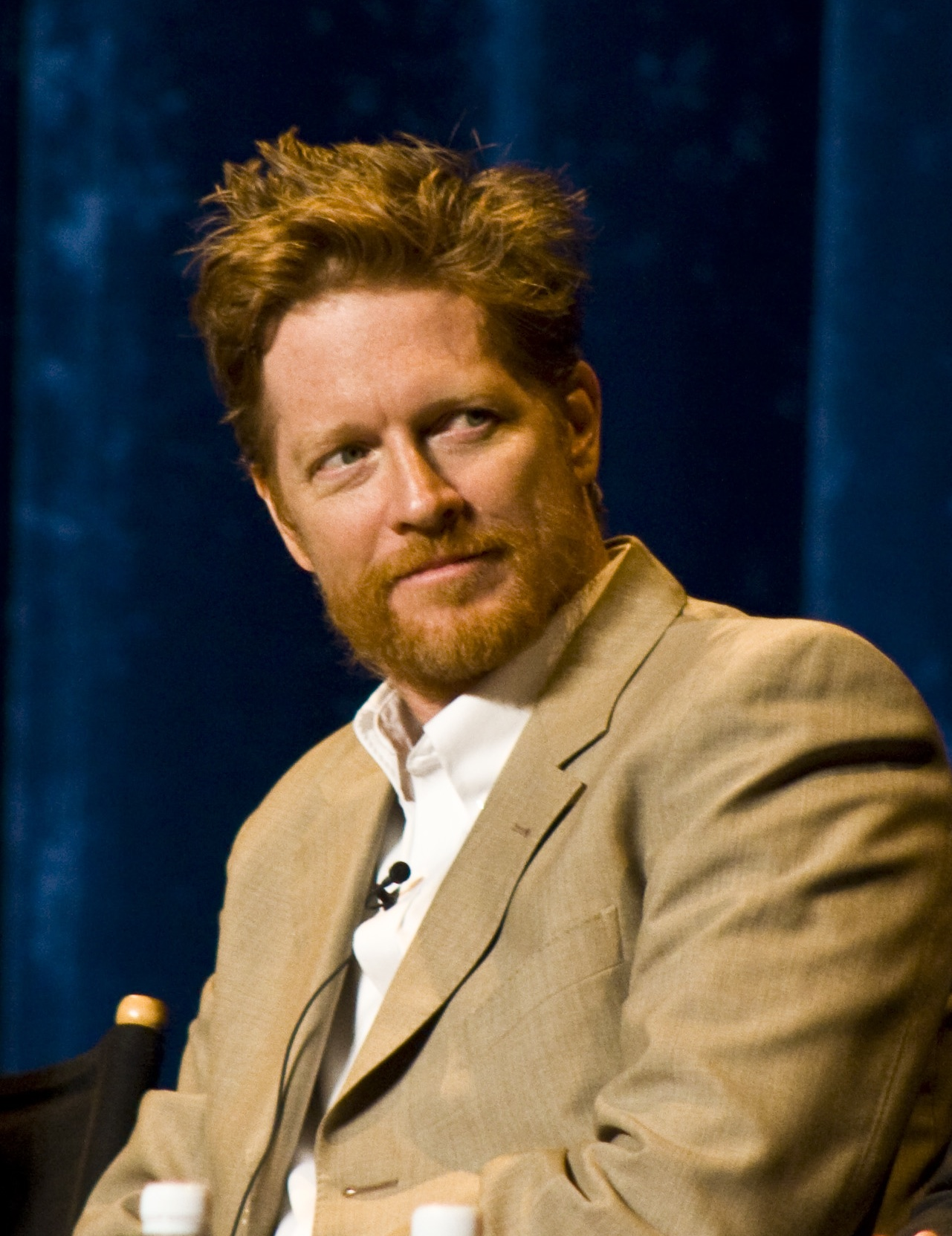
- Stoltz in 2009
- Born: Eric Cameron Stoltz; September 30, 1961 (age 65); Whittier, California, U.S.
- Occupations: Actor; director; producer
- Years active: 1978–present
- Spouse: Bernadette Moley (m. 2005)
- Children: 1

Eric Cameron Stoltz (born September 30, 1961) is an American actor, director and producer. He played Rocky Dennis in the biographical drama film Mask (1985), which earned him the nomination for the Golden Globe Award for Best Supporting Actor in a Motion Picture. He was also nominated for the Independent Spirit Award for Best Supporting Male for his performance in Pulp Fiction (1994).

He has appeared in a wide variety of other films, including Some Kind of Wonderful (1987), Say Anything... (1989), The Waterdance (1992), Killing Zoe (1993), Little Women (1994), Rob Roy (1995), Kicking and Screaming (1995), Anaconda (1997), Mr. Jealousy (1997), and The Butterfly Effect (2004). Stoltz is also a prolific television director, most notably on Glee (2010–2014) and Madam Secretary (2014–2019).

== Early life ==
Eric Stoltz was born September 30, 1961 in Whittier, California, the son of Evelyn (née Vawter), a violinist and schoolteacher, and Jack Stoltz, an elementary school teacher. He has two sisters.

Stoltz was raised in both American Samoa and Santa Barbara, California. He attended the University of Southern California, but dropped out after his junior year. He moved to New York in 1981 and studied acting with Stella Adler and Peggy Feury.

== Career ==
In the 1970s, Stoltz joined a repertory company that performed ten plays at the Edinburgh Festival. He returned to the United States in 1979, when he entered USC as a drama student. He dropped out to pursue film and television roles.

In 1978, he was cast as Steve Benson in the television adaptation of Erma Bombeck's The Grass Is Always Greener Over the Septic Tank.

Director Cameron Crowe and Stoltz became friends when the latter appeared in his first feature film, Fast Times at Ridgemont High (1982). Crowe wrote it and Stoltz had a minor role. According to Stoltz, Crowe promised Stoltz roles in all of his future films.

Stoltz was cast in each of Crowe's next four films, The Wild Life (1984), Say Anything... (1989), Singles (1992) and Jerry Maguire (1996).

In 1985, Stoltz received a Golden Globe nomination for starring performance as Rocky Dennis in Mask. Among his other roles in the 1980s, he appeared in the 1987 film Some Kind of Wonderful, written and produced by John Hughes.

Stoltz was originally cast as Marty McFly in Back to the Future. His view of the movie clashed, however, with that of the director, Robert Zemeckis. While the film was to become a sci-fi comedy (and box office smash hit), Stoltz had read the script from a more serious angle, apparently focusing on the tragic consequences of going back to live a life that was not one's own. Five weeks into shooting, Zemeckis replaced Stoltz with Michael J. Fox.

In 1989, Stoltz starred as the lead character of the sequel The Fly II. The movie was a hit, grossing approximately $38.9 million worldwide.

In the 1990s, Stoltz worked in stage, film and television, appearing in studio and independent films such as Memphis Belle (1990), The Waterdance (1992), Pulp Fiction (1994), Grace of My Heart (1996) and Anaconda (1997), and produced the films Bodies, Rest & Motion (1993), Sleep with Me (1994) and Mr. Jealousy (1997).

He continued to appear on the New York stage, both on Broadway (Three Sisters, Two Shakespearean Actors, Arms and the Man, Our Town) and off-Broadway (The Importance of Being Earnest, The Glass Menagerie, Sly Fox). He was nominated for a Tony Award as Featured Actor for his performance as George Gibbs in the 1989 Broadway revival of Thornton Wilder's Our Town.

A performance of this production was featured on Great Performances: Live from Lincoln Center, which received a 1989 Emmy nomination.

On television, he had a recurring role as Helen Hunt's character's ex-boyfriend on Mad About You (five episodes, 1994–1998), spent a year on Chicago Hope (1994) and did some television and cable films such as Inside (1996) (directed by Arthur Penn) and The Passion of Ayn Rand (1999), with Helen Mirren. Stoltz received the Indie Supporter Award at the 1998 Los Angeles Film Festival.

In 2000, he starred with Gillian Anderson in The House of Mirth (2000), based on the novel by Edith Wharton. From 2001 to 2002, he had a recurring role as the English teacher-poet August Dimitri in ABC's Once and Again, wherein Julia Whelan's character, a teenager, fell in love with his character. He directed an episode of the show in 2002.

In 2003, he played his first leading TV role in Out of Order, which was canceled after five episodes. At the same year, he also played Otto in When Zachary Beaver Came to Town, alongside Jonathan Lipnicki. In 2004, he appeared in The Butterfly Effect as a child molester; the following year, he guest-starred in the NBC sitcom Will & Grace as Debra Messing's love interest. He was nominated for a Daytime Emmy for his direction of the cable movie My Horrible Year! (2001). He also directed a short film entitled The Bulls as well as the highest-rated episode of Law & Order in 2005, entitled "Tombstone". He appeared in the music video of The Residents' "Give It to Someone Else", featured on The Commercial DVD.

He has contributed essays to the books City Secrets--New York as well as Life Interrupted by Spalding Gray and appears on the children's CD Philadelphia Chickens.

Beginning in 2007, Stoltz directed episodes of the drama series Quarterlife, which began airing as webisodes and were then picked up to air on NBC in 2008. Stoltz played a serial killer in need of medical attention in three episodes of the fifth season of Grey's Anatomy. He has also directed two episodes of Grey's Anatomy.

Stoltz starred as Daniel Graystone, inventor of the Cylons, in the science fiction television series Caprica, a prequel set 58 years before the Battlestar Galactica series.

He became a regular director of the series Glee, directing a total of 12 episodes, including "Nationals", in which the Glee club finally wins the championship.

In the 2011 film Fort McCoy Stoltz played the leading role of a conflicted barber of German heritage forced to suppress his American patriotism after moving his family to a post–World War II military base housing a German POW camp.

Starting in 2014, Stoltz became the producing director of the CBS political drama series Madam Secretary. The following year he became one of its four executive producers, alongside Morgan Freeman and Barbara Hall and has directed more than 10 episodes, as well as starring alongside Téa Leoni in several episodes as her brother, Will Adams.

== Personal life ==
Stoltz and Bridget Fonda began dating in 1990. The relationship ended after eight years.

Stoltz married Bernadette Moley, a singer, in 2005. The couple has one child, a daughter.

Stoltz is a vegetarian.

== Filmography ==
=== Actor ===
==== Film ====
| Year | Title | Role | Notes |
|---|---|---|---|
| 1982 | Fast Times at Ridgemont High | Stoner Bud | |
| 1984 | Surf II | Chuck | |
| 1984 | Running Hot | Danny Hicks | |
| 1984 | The Wild Life | Bill Conrad | |
| 1984 | Back to the Future | Marty McFly | Unreleased scenes filmed over weeks in 1984 and recast except for one shot, where he hits Biff in the diner |
| 1985 | The New Kids | Mark | |
| 1985 | Mask | Rocky Dennis | Nominated—Golden Globe Award for Best Supporting Actor – Motion Picture |
| 1985 | Code Name: Emerald | Lt. Andy Wheeler | |
| 1987 | Some Kind of Wonderful | Keith Nelson | |
| 1987 | Lionheart | Robert Nerra | |
| 1987 | Sister, Sister | Matt Rutledge | |
| 1988 | Greasy Lake | The Narrator | Direct-to-video |
| 1988 | Manifesto | Christopher | |
| 1988 | Haunted Summer | Percy Shelley | |
| 1989 | The Rachel Papers | Guy at restaurant | Uncredited |
| 1989 | The Fly II | Martin Brundle | |
| 1989 | Say Anything... | Vahlere | |
| 1990 | Memphis Belle | Sgt. Danny "Danny Boy" Daly | |
| 1991 | Money | Franck Cimballi | |
| 1992 | The Waterdance | Joel Garcia | |
| 1992 | Singles | The Mime | |
| 1993 | Bodies, Rest & Motion | Sid | Also producer |
| 1993 | Naked in New York | Jake Briggs | |
| 1994 | Killing Zoe | Zed | |
| 1994 | Pulp Fiction | Lance | Nominated—Independent Spirit Award for Best Supporting Male |
| 1994 | Sleep with Me | Joseph | Also producer |
| 1994 | Little Women | John Brooke | |
| 1995 | Killing Time | Stop N Start Manager | Short film |
| 1995 | The Prophecy | Simon | |
| 1995 | Rob Roy | Alan MacDonald | |
| 1995 | Never Say Goodbye Aids Benefit by Yoko Ono | Man From Hamptons | Short film |
| 1995 | Fluke | Jeff Newman | |
| 1995 | Kicking and Screaming | Chet | |
| 1996 | Grace of My Heart | Howard Cazsatt | |
| 1996 | 2 Days in the Valley | Wes Taylor | |
| 1996 | Jerry Maguire | Ethan Valhere | |
| 1996 | Inside | Marty Strydom | |
| 1997 | Keys to Tulsa | Richter Boudreau | |
| 1997 | Anaconda | Dr. Steven Cale | |
| 1997 | Mr. Jealousy | Lester Grimm | Also executive producer |
| 1997 | Highball | Darien | |
| 1998 | Hi-Life | Jimmy | |
| 1998 | The Rocking Horse Winner | Uncle Joe | Short film |
| 1998 | A Murder of Crows | Thurman Parks III | |
| 2000 | It's a Shame About Ray | Mr. Stoltz | Short film |
| 2000 | Jesus & Hutch | Jesus | Short film |
| 2000 | The Simian Line | Sam Donovan | |
| 2000 | The House of Mirth | Lawrence Selden | |
| 2001 | Things Behind the Sun | Dan | |
| 2001 | Harvard Man | Teddy Carter | |
| 2002 | The Rules of Attraction | Mr. Lawson | |
| 2003 | Happy Hour | Levine | |
| 2003 | When Zachary Beaver Came to Town | Otto | |
| 2004 | The Butterfly Effect | Mr. Miller | |
| 2004 | Childstar | Fresno Burnbaum | |
| 2005 | Hello | Max | Short film |
| 2005 | The Honeymooners | William Davis | |
| 2006 | The Lather Effect | Mickey | Also associate producer |
| 2007 | The Grand Design | Josh | Short film; also executive producer |
| 2009 | Sparks | Joseph | Short film |
| 2011 | Fort McCoy | Frank Stirn | Also producer |
| 2014 | 5 to 7 | Galassi | |
| 2015 | Larry Gaye: Renegade Male Flight Attendant | Russ Peterson | |
| 2018 | Her Smell | Howard | |
| 2019 | Lucky Day | Authority | Voice cameo |

==== Television ====
| Year | Title | Role | Notes |
|---|---|---|---|
| 1978 | James at 15 | Jack | Episode: "Hunter Country" |
| 1978 | The Grass Is Always Greener Over the Septic Tank | Steve Benson | Television film |
| 1979 | A New Kind of Family | Burt | Episode: Invasion of Privacy |
| 1979 | The Seekers | First Boy | Television film |
| 1980 | The Waltons | Sr. Boy #1 | Episode: "The Valediction" |
| 1980 | Eight Is Enough | Kurt Harper | Episode: "Finally Grad Night" |
| 1981 | Walking Tall | David Coombs | Episode: "The Killing of McNeal County's Children" |
| 1981 | Knots Landing | Luke | Episode: "Man of the Hour" |
| 1981 | The Violation of Sarah McDavid | Pete Brady | Television film |
| 1982 | Paper Dolls | Steve Stratton | Television film |
| 1982 | Seven Brides for Seven Brothers | Kevin | Episode: "Challenges" |
| 1983 | The Fall Guy | Little Juice Atkins | Episode: "One Hundred Miles a Gallon" |
| 1983 | Love, Sidney | Rick | Episode: "The Movie" |
| 1983 | A Killer in the Family | Ricky Tison | Television film |
| 1983 | St. Elsewhere | Eddie Carson | 3 episodes |
| 1984 | Things Are Looking Up | Neil 'Trout' Troutman | Television film |
| 1989 | Great Performances | George Gibbs | Episode: "Our Town" |
| 1990 | American Playhouse | Younger Edward | Episode: "Sensibility and Sense" |
| 1991 | A Woman at War | Franz Bueller | Television film |
| 1992 | The Heart of Justice | David Leader | Television film |
| 1993 | Foreign Affairs | Fred Turner | Television film |
| 1993 | Frasier | Don (voice) | Episode: "Miracle On Third Or Fourth Street" |
| 1994 | Roommates | Bill Thomas | Television film |
| 1994–1998 | Mad About You | Alan Tofsky | 6 episodes |
| 1995 | Fallen Angels | Nick Ballestier | Episode: "A Dime a Dance" |
| 1995 | Partners | Cameron | Episode: "How Long Does It Take to Cook a 22-Pound Turkey?" |
| 1996 | Don't Look Back | Jesse Parish | Television film |
| 1996 | Inside | Marty Strydom | Television film |
| 1997 | Homicide: Life on the Street | Drew Kellerman | Episode: "Wu's on First?" |
| 1998 | Blackout Effect | John Dantley | Television film |
| 1998–1999 | Hercules | Theseus / The Grim Avenger (voices) | 2 episodes |
| 1998–1999 | Chicago Hope | Dr. Robert Yeats | 24 episodes |
| 1999 | The Passion of Ayn Rand | Nathaniel Branden | Television film |
| 1999 | Our Guys: Outrage at Glen Ridge | Prosecutor Bob Laurino | Television film |
| 2000 | Common Ground | Johnny Burroughs | Television film |
| 2000 | One Kill | Capt. Wallker Randall | Television film |
| 2000 | The Last Dance | Todd Cope | Television film |
| 2001 | My Horrible Year! | Uncle Charlie | Television film |
| 2001–2002 | Once and Again | August Dimitri | 7 episodes |
| 2002 | Law & Order: Special Victims Unit | Father Michael Sweeney | Episode: "Silence" |
| 2003 | Out of Order | Mark Colm | 6 episodes |
| 2005 | Will & Grace | Tom Cassidy | 3 episodes |
| 2005 | The Triangle | Howard Thomas | 3 episodes |
| 2007 | Medium | Sonny Troyer | Episode: "We Had a Dream" |
| 2007 | Close to Home | Det. Chris Veeder | 3 episodes |
| 2008 | Blank Slate | Sean Sullivan | Television film |
| 2009 | Grey's Anatomy | William Dunn | 3 episodes |
| 2009–2010 | Caprica | Daniel Graystone | 18 episodes |
| 2011 | Leverage | Alan Scott | Episode: "The Long Way Down Job" |
| 2013 | Maron | Danny | Episode: "Projections" |
| 2014 | Blue | Arthur | 4 episodes |
| 2014–2019 | Madam Secretary | Will Adams | 11 episodes |
| 2022 | Bull | Matthew Price | 2 episodes |
| 2022 | The Good Fight | Judge Meachem | Episode: "The End of STR Laurie" |
| 2024 | The Girls on the Bus | John Spencer | Episode: "The Audacity of Nope" |
| 2026 | Law & Order | Evan Cole | Episode: Accident Like A Martyr |

=== Director ===
==== Film ====
Key
| † | Denotes films that have not yet been released |

| Year | Title | Notes |
|---|---|---|
| 2005 | The Bulls | Short film; also executive producer |
| 2007 | The Grand Design | Short film; also executive producer |
| 2017 | Confessions of a Teenage Jesus Jerk | Also producer |
| 2017 | Class Rank | |
| TBA | Both Sides Now † | Filming |

==== Television ====
| Year | Title | Notes |
|---|---|---|
| 2001 | My Horrible Year! | Television film |
| 2002 | Once and Again | Episode: "Falling in Place" |
| 2005 | Law & Order | Episode: "Tombstone" |
| 2007 | Boston Legal | 2 episodes |
| 2008 | Quarterlife | 2 episodes |
| 2008 | Grey's Anatomy | 2 episodes |
| 2009 | Nip/Tuck | Episode: "Lola Wlodkowski" |
| 2009–2011 | Private Practice | 4 episodes |
| 2010 | Huge | Episode: "Talent Night" |
| 2010 | Caprica | Episode: "Unvanquished" |
| 2010–2014 | Glee | 12 episodes |
| 2011 | Off the Map | Episode: "On the Mean Streets of San Miguel" |
| 2012 | Californication | Episode: "Love Song" |
| 2012 | White Collar | Episode: "Ice Breaker" |
| 2012 | Made in Jersey | Episode: "Ridgewell" |
| 2013 | Nashville | 4 episodes |
| 2014 | How to Get Away with Murder | Episode: "He deserved to die" |
| 2014 | Black Box | 2 episodes |
| 2014 | Believe | Episode: "Perception" |
| 2014–2019 | Madam Secretary | 19 episodes; also co-executive producer and executive producer |
| 2020–2022 | Bull | 6 episodes; also executive producer |
| 2025 | Countdown | Episode: "Nothing Else Helps" |
