= Lowball =

Lowball can refer to:

- Low-ball, a persuasion, negotiation, and selling technique
- Lowball (poker), a variant of the card game poker, in which hand values are reversed so that the lowest-valued hand wins
- Lowball glass, a short drinking glass typically used for serving liquor

== See also ==
- Highball
