= While We're Young (film) =

2014 film by Noah Baumbach

- Theatrical release poster
- Directed by: Noah Baumbach
- Written by: Noah Baumbach
- Produced by: Scott Rudin; Noah Baumbach; Lila Yacoub; Eli Bush
- Starring: Ben Stiller; Naomi Watts; Adam Driver; Amanda Seyfried; Charles Grodin; Adam Horovitz
- Cinematography: Sam Levy
- Edited by: Jennifer Lame
- Music by: James Murphy
- Production company: Scott Rudin Productions
- Distributed by: A24
- Release dates: September 6, 2014 (TIFF); March 27, 2015 (United States)
- Running time: 97 minutes
- Country: United States
- Language: English
- Budget: $10 million
- Box office: $18.1 million

While We're Young is a 2014 American comedy-drama film written, produced, and directed by Noah Baumbach. The film stars Ben Stiller, Naomi Watts, Adam Driver, and Amanda Seyfried; its plot centers on a New York City–based documentary filmmaker and his wife, a couple in their 40s, who develop a friendship with a couple in their 20s.

The film premiered at the Toronto International Film Festival on September 6, 2014, and was released in the United States on March 27, 2015, by A24. The film went on to gross more than any of Baumbach's previous films at the US box office.

== Plot ==
Middle-aged couple Josh and Cornelia Srebnick are filmmakers living in a shaky marriage in New York City. Josh has spent the last 10 years struggling on the post-production of his documentary film about leftist intellectual Ira Mandelstam while not letting his producer wife help him with the project.

After finishing a lecture at the college where he teaches, Josh is approached by Jamie and Darby Massey, a young millennial couple who invite him and Cornelia out to dinner. Jamie claims to be a fan of Josh's work and the works of his accomplished documentary filmmaker father-in-law, Leslie Breitbart. Josh is immediately awestruck by Jamie and Darby's non-conservative outlook on life as he and Cornelia begin spending more and more time with them, joining in on their bohemian lifestyle.

An aspiring filmmaker himself, Jamie talks with Josh about their projects, including Josh's own documentary. This inspires Jamie to make a film about connecting with an old high school friend that he found on Facebook. Jamie and Darby invite Josh and Cornelia to an ayahuasca ceremony where a hallucinating Cornelia kisses Jamie while Jamie receives Josh's approval in helping with the production of his film. Cornelia agrees to produce the film. Jamie and Josh find the old friend, Kent Arlington, who is in the hospital after a suicide attempt. Josh and Jamie discover that Kent was involved in a civilian massacre during an Army tour in Afghanistan, creating an even bigger story for Jamie's film.

While pitching his own film, Josh is dismayed when he cannot engage a potential hedge fund investor with the concept of his intellectual documentary. He goes to Leslie for a second opinion. When Leslie's criticisms and suggestions are brought down by Josh, they get into an argument over Josh and Cornelia's inability to have children, as well as Josh calling himself a disappointment to himself.

Josh attends a party for a screening of Jamie's film, which is met far more positively by Leslie and the hedge fund investor. A jealous Josh argues with Cornelia over Jamie's success, and they separate. Josh meets up with Darby, who is sick of Jamie's increasingly self-centered attitude and tells him about Cornelia kissing Jamie. Josh confronts Cornelia the next morning and denounces Jamie.

While teaming up with his editor on cutting his film, Josh comes across footage for Jamie's film, finding evidence that suggests the meeting with Kent was actually staged. Finding him, Kent reveals that he was really friends with Darby, not Jamie, and that he was contacted by Jamie weeks before their shoot. Capturing his confession on camera, Josh goes to Jamie and Darby to confront him, only to discover that a fed-up Darby is moving out and that Jamie is at the tribute celebrating Leslie at Lincoln Center.

Josh confronts Jamie in private at the event, admonishing him for compromising the truth and genuineness of his story for dramatic purposes. Josh forces Jamie to admit the truth to Leslie, who excuses it, saying that it is a good story regardless of the fabrication. Defeated, Josh admits to Leslie he was right about the edits needed on his film. Outside, Josh and Cornelia reconcile.

One year later, Josh and Cornelia drive to the airport for a flight to Port-au-Prince, Haiti, where they will adopt a newborn baby. Josh finds an article in a magazine lauding Jamie as a filmmaking genius, which Cornelia and Josh pass off by admitting, "He's not evil, he's just young." They then watch a young child at the gate playing with an iPhone, studying him as if to imply that yet another generation with disparate ethics and morals is approaching.

== Cast ==
- Ben Stiller as Josh Srebnick
- Naomi Watts as Cornelia Srebnick (née Breitbart)
- Adam Driver as Jamie Massey
- Amanda Seyfried as Darby Massey
- Charles Grodin as Leslie Breitbart
- Adam Horovitz as Fletcher
- Maria Dizzia as Marina
- Dree Hemingway as Tipper
- Brady Corbet as Kent Arlington
- Matt Maher as Tim
- Peter Yarrow as Ira Mandelstam
- Matthew Shear as Benny
- Annie Baker as Elise
- James Saito as Dr. Nagato
- Ryan Serhant as Hedge Fund Dave

Peter Bogdanovich appears as an MC at an event celebrating Leslie Breitbart, and Greta Lee voices a Sundance interviewer.

== Production ==
=== Filming ===
The film was spotted shooting on September 17, 2013, in New York City.

=== Music ===
The film score was composed by James Murphy.

== Release ==
While We're Young had its world premiere in the Special Presentations section of the Toronto International Film Festival on September 6, 2014. Shortly afterward, A24 acquired US distribution rights to the film for $4 million. The film opened in theaters in New York City and Los Angeles on March 27, 2015, before expanding nationwide in April.

== Reception ==
=== Box office ===
While We're Young opened in limited release in the United States on March 27, 2015, and earned $227,688, ranking number 24 in the box office that weekend. On April 17, the film was given a wide release and grossed $1.4 million, ranking number 12. The film eventually grossed $7.6 million domestically, more than all of Baumbach's previous films in the United States box office.

=== Critical response ===
On the review aggregator website Rotten Tomatoes, the film holds an approval rating of 84% based on 202 reviews, with an average rating of 7.3/10. The website's critics consensus reads, "Poignant and piercingly honest, While We're Young finds writer-director Noah Baumbach delivering some of his funniest lines through some of his most relatable characters." On Metacritic, which assigns a weighted average score out of 100 to reviews from mainstream critics, the film received an average score of 77, based on reviews from 44 critics, indicating "generally favorable" reviews.

Peter Debruge of Variety wrote: "Though While We're Young is primarily a comedy—and a very funny one at that, managing to be both blisteringly of-the-moment and classically zany in the same breath—Baumbach has bitten off several serious topics, for which laughter serves as the most agreeable way to engage." Richard Roeper of the Chicago Sun-Times wrote: "If While We're Young hadn't gone quite so broad at the finish line, it would be a contender for my favorite movie of the still-young year."

Todd McCarthy of The Hollywood Reporter called it a "mostly engaging but only fitfully inspired serio-comedy."

== Notes ==
The film opens with a quote from Henrik Ibsen's play The Master Builder.
