= Noah Baumbach =

American filmmaker (born 1969)

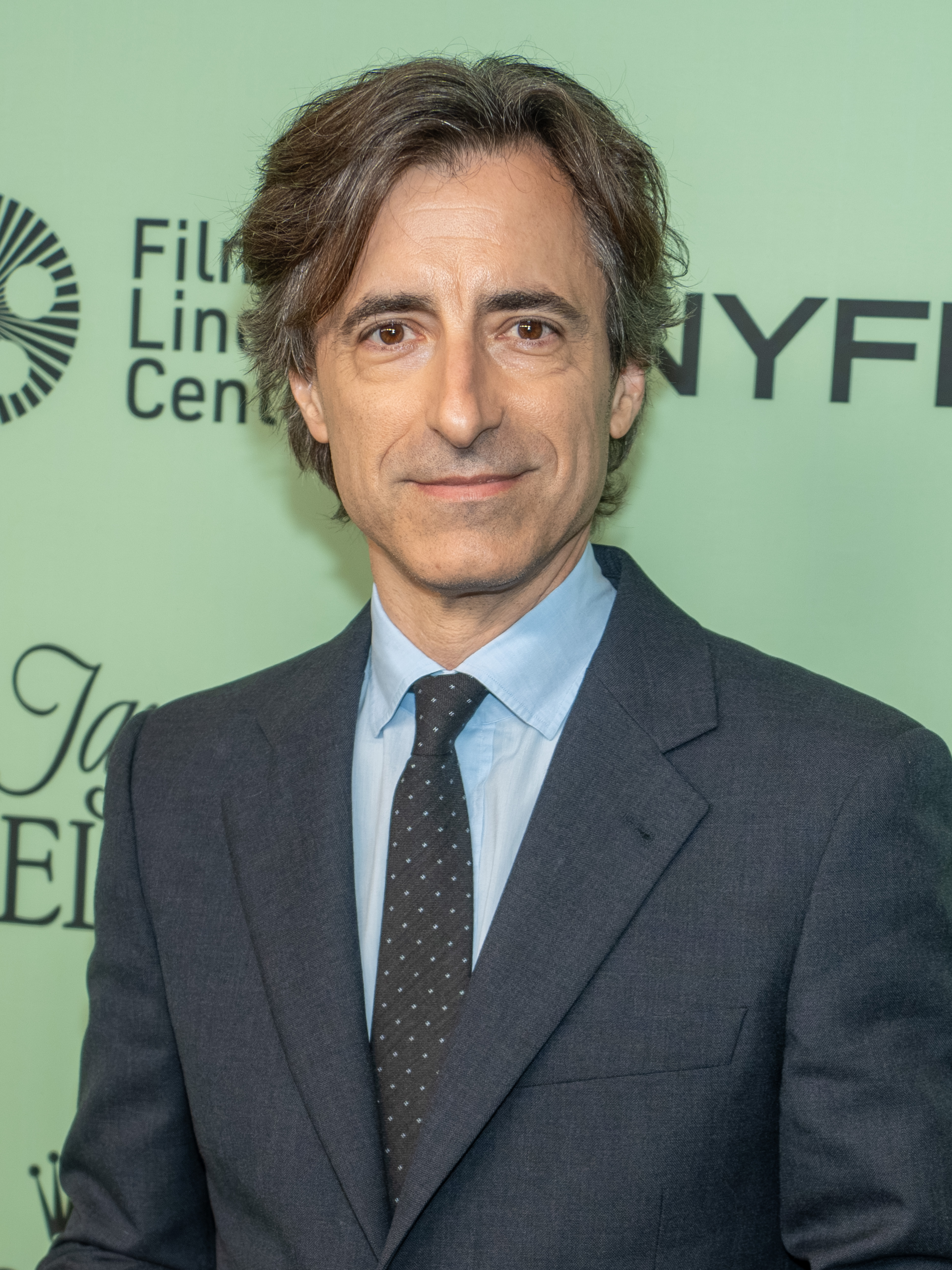
- Baumbach at the 2025 New York Film Festival
- Born: September 3, 1969 (age 57); New York City, U.S.
- Education: Vassar College (AB)
- Occupation: Filmmaker
- Years active: 1995–present
- Spouses: Jennifer Jason Leigh (m. 2005; div. 2013) Greta Gerwig (m. 2023)
- Children: 3
- Father: Jonathan Baumbach

Noah Baumbach (born September 3, 1969) is an American filmmaker. He is known for making films set in New York City and his works are inspired by filmmakers such as Woody Allen and Whit Stillman. His frequent collaborators include Wes Anderson, Adam Driver, and his wife, Greta Gerwig. He has received various accolades including a Critics' Choice Awards, two Independent Spirit Awards and three Gotham Awards as well as award nominations for four Academy Awards, two BAFTA Awards and two Golden Globe Awards.

Baumbach first gained attention for his early films Kicking and Screaming (1995), and Mr. Jealousy (1997). His breakthrough film The Squid and the Whale (2005) earned him a nomination for the Academy Award for Best Original Screenplay. He first collaborated with Gerwig on Greenberg (2010) and their collaborations continued with Frances Ha (2013), Mistress America (2015), White Noise (2022), and Barbie (2023).

His other films include Margot at the Wedding (2007), While We're Young (2014), The Meyerowitz Stories (2017), and Jay Kelly (2025). Marriage Story (2019) earned an Academy Award for Best Picture nomination and Baumbach's second Best Original Screenplay nomination. For Barbie, which he co-wrote with Gerwig, he received his third screenplay nomination for Academy Award for Best Adapted Screenplay. He is also known for co-writing with Anderson on The Life Aquatic with Steve Zissou (2004) and Fantastic Mr. Fox (2009).

In 2025, he was awarded the Telluride Film Festival Silver Medallion.

== Early life and education ==
Baumbach was born on September 3, 1969, in Brooklyn, New York City, into a family with Jewish roots. His father, Jonathan Baumbach, was an author of experimental fiction and the co-founder of the publishing house Fiction Collective, taught at Stanford University and Brooklyn College, and was a film critic for Partisan Review. His mother, Georgia Brown, was a film critic for The Village Voice who also wrote fiction. His parents divorced during his adolescence, which served as inspiration for his 2005 film The Squid and the Whale. Baumbach has three siblings, two of whom are from his father's previous marriage.

Baumbach grew up in Park Slope, Brooklyn, and from a young age he was determined to become a professional filmmaker. Films that influenced Baumbach include The Jerk, Animal House, Heaven Can Wait, The World According to Garp, E.T. the Extra-Terrestrial, and Invasion of the Body Snatchers.

He graduated from Brooklyn's Midwood High School in 1987 and received his A.B. in English from Vassar College in 1991. While at Vassar, he and fellow future filmmaker, Jason Blum, were roommates (Blum later produced Baumbach's first film, Kicking and Screaming in 1995). Soon after, he briefly worked as a messenger at The New Yorker.

== Career ==
=== 1990–1999: Early independent films ===
Baumbach made his writing and directing debut in 1995 with Kicking and Screaming, a comedy about four young men who graduate from college and refuse to move on with their lives. The film starred Josh Hamilton, Chris Eigeman, and Carlos Jacott and premiered in 1995 at the New York Film Festival. In an interview with The A.V. Club, Baumbach said of his influences on the film, "I really responded to the kind of ensemble feeling of Metropolitan, I was also thinking a lot about Diner, which was another great ensemble "friends" comedy." Baumbach was chosen as one of Newsweek's "Ten New Faces of 1996". Roger Ebert praised the film's "good eye and a terrific ear; the dialogue by writer-director Noah Baumbach is not simply accurate... but a distillation of reality – elevating aimless brainy small-talk into a statement." Reviews often mentioned the thin and meandering plot, but most noted this as a facet of the characters' life stage. Janet Maslin of The New York Times stated, "Kicking and Screaming occupies its postage-stamp size terrain with confident comic style."

In 1997, he wrote and directed Mr. Jealousy, a film about a young writer so jealous about his girlfriend that he sneaks into the group therapy sessions of her ex-boyfriend to discover what kind of relationship they had. He then co-wrote (under the name Jesse Carter) and directed (under the name Ernie Fusco) the New York-set comedy of manners Highball. Baumbach disowned the film according to a 2005 interview in The A.V. Club, the director stated,

The truth is, I never "owned" Highball. It really was an experiment, and kind of a foolish experiment, because I didn't think about what the ramifications would be if it didn't work. But it was made with all the best intentions, which was to try and make a movie in six days, and use all the same people from Mr. Jealousy, with all their goodwill, and bring in some more people. And it was a funny script. But it was just too ambitious. We didn't have enough time, we didn't finish it, it didn't look good, it was just a whole... mess. [Laughs.] We couldn't get it done, and I had a falling out with the producer. He abandoned it, and I had no money to finish it, to go back and maybe get two more days or something. Then later, it was put out on DVD without my approval.

=== 2000–2009: Collaborations and breakthrough ===
In 2004, Baumbach collaborated with screenwriter and director Wes Anderson, co-writing with Anderson, The Life Aquatic with Steve Zissou (2004). The following year, he released his fourth feature film, The Squid and the Whale (2005) which was a semi-autobiographical comedy-drama about his childhood in Brooklyn and the effect of his parents' divorce on the family in the mid-1980s. The film stars Jeff Daniels and Laura Linney in the parent roles. In an interview with author Jonathan Lethem in BOMB Magazine, Baumbach said of the film, "Sometimes when I think about the whole experience of this, it starts to become a joke within a joke within a joke. The film is not only inspired by my childhood and my parents’ divorce, but it was also the first script I didn't show to my parents while I was working on it. It's not that I wanted to protect them from anything. I just wanted to keep it my own experience." The Squid and the Whale was a sleeper hit and a critical success, earning Baumbach two awards at the 2005 Sundance Film Festival as well as an Academy Award nomination for Best Original Screenplay. It also received six Independent Spirit Award nominations, three Golden Globe nominations and the New York Film Critics Circle, Los Angeles Film Critics Association and the National Board of Review all voted it the year's best screenplay.

Baumbach wrote and directed the 2007 dramedy Margot at the Wedding, starring his then wife, Jennifer Jason Leigh, Nicole Kidman, Jack Black, and John Turturro. In the film, Kidman plays a woman named Margot who spends several days visiting her sister Pauline (Leigh) on the eve of Pauline's wedding to Black's character. It was shot in April and May 2006 in Hampton Bays and City Island, Bronx. The film was released in the United States by Paramount Vantage on November 16, 2007. Baumbach helped to write and direct the short films Clearing the Air and New York Underground which aired on Saturday Night Live. The films were co-written and co-produced by cast-members Fred Armisen and Bill Hader. New York Underground featured Hader as a British rock journalist doing a piece on quirky underground musician Joshua Rainhorne (Armisen has performed as Joshua at numerous live events). Clearing the Air featured Hader, Armisen, and Paul Rudd (who was the guest host for that week) trying to clear the air over a girl they all slept with. Both pieces aired on SNL in the fall of 2008.

Baumbach co-wrote the screenplay for the 2009 film version of Roald Dahl's Fantastic Mr Fox with Wes Anderson, who directed it using stop-motion technology. The film was a critical success appearing on many critics top 10 lists of the year. The film also received the Academy Award, British Academy Film Award, and Golden Globe Award nomination for Best Animated Film, losing to Pixar's Up. Despite the critical praise the film was not a financial success.

=== 2010–2019: Gerwig influence and acclaim ===
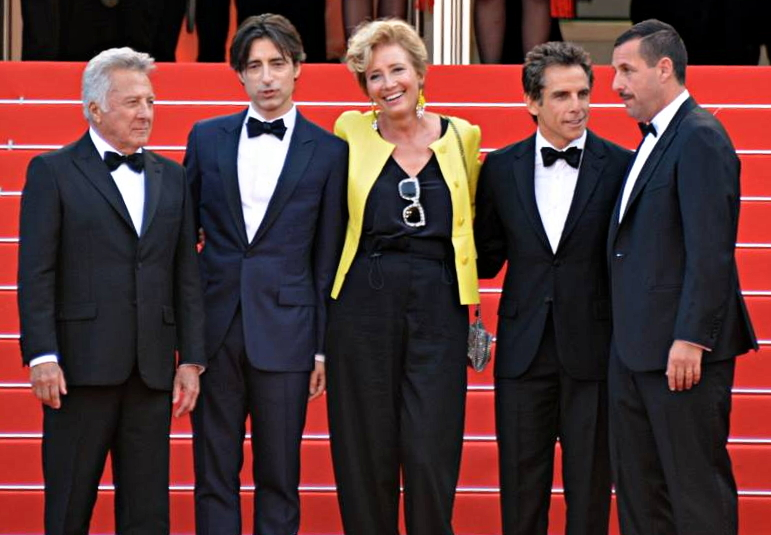
Dustin Hoffman, Baumbach, Emma Thompson, Ben Stiller, and Adam Sandler at the Cannes Film Festival screening of The Meyerowitz Stories in 2017

His film Greenberg was released March 2010. It starred Ben Stiller, Greta Gerwig and Rhys Ifans. The story was conceived by Baumbach and Jennifer Jason Leigh. The film nominated for the Golden Bear at the 60th Berlin International Film Festival. In 2012, Baumbach directed the comedic drama Frances Ha, which he cowrote with Greta Gerwig, who also starred. The film played at the Toronto International Film Festival. Baumbach filmed Frances Ha with his cinematographer Sam Levy digitally and in black-and-white, the latter to emulate in part collaborations by Woody Allen and his cinematographer Gordon Willis, in films like Manhattan (1979). CBS News compared Frances Ha's style to the works of Woody Allen, Jim Jarmusch and François Truffaut. Gerwig received a Golden Globe Award nomination for her performance.

Baumbach has "shown an affinity for writing about the East Coast elite." Baumbach has written an adaptation of Curtis Sittenfeld's novel Prep. He also co-wrote a screenplay for the animated film Madagascar 3: Europe's Most Wanted. He worked on HBO's adaptation of the Jonathan Franzen novel The Corrections, but the pilot was never completed and HBO passed on the project. Baumbach wrote and directed the 2014 comedy-drama While We're Young, starring Ben Stiller, Naomi Watts, Adam Driver and Amanda Seyfried. A24 Films released the film on March 27, 2015, and the film went on to gross more than all of Baumbach's previous films in the United States box office. He also directed and cowrote the 2015 comedy Mistress America, starring Greta Gerwig and Lola Kirke. The film, which premiered at the Sundance Film Festival, was released to general audiences on August 14. That same year he presented De Palma, a documentary about filmmaker Brian De Palma that he co-directed with Jake Paltrow. It premiered at the 2015 Venice Film Festival.

In 2017, The Meyerowitz Stories was released on October 13 on Netflix. Before its streaming debut, the film was selected to compete for the Palme d'Or in the main competition at the 2017 Cannes Film Festival. The film focuses on a fractured and dysfunctional family, and starred Dustin Hoffman, Ben Stiller, Adam Sandler and Emma Thompson. On the review aggregator Rotten Tomatoes, the film holds an approval rating of 92% based on 181 reviews, and an average rating of 7.66/10. The website's critical consensus reads, "The Meyerowitz Stories (New and Selected) observes the family dynamic through writer-director Noah Baumbach's bittersweet lens and the impressive efforts of a remarkable cast." On Metacritic, the film has a weighted average score of 79 out of 100, based on 40 critics, indicating "generally favorable reviews".

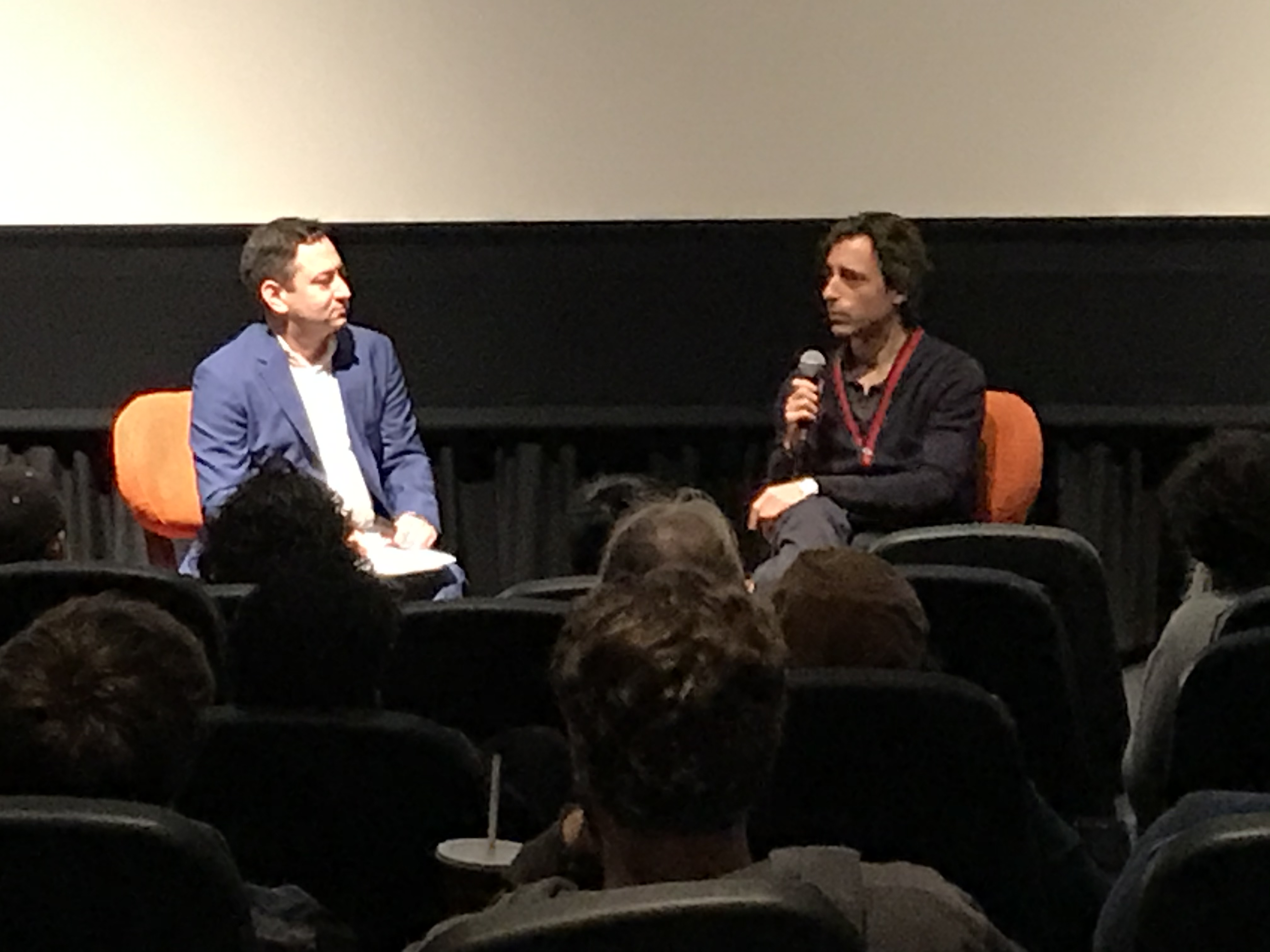
Baumbach (right) speaking after a screening of Marriage Story with The Hollywood Reporter columnist Scott Feinberg in November 2019

In 2019, Baumbach wrote, produced and directed Marriage Story. The film follows a showbusiness couple and their marriage breaking up followed by an emotional divorce preceding. The film starred Adam Driver and Scarlett Johansson as the family couple. Alan Alda, Ray Liotta and Laura Dern also portray the lawyers involved about the divorce. The film also featured performances by Merritt Wever, Julie Hagerty and Wallace Shawn. It premiered to great acclaim at the Venice Film Festival, before it was released on Netflix on November 6, 2019, with many ranking it among Baumbach's best work. Mark Kermode, film critic at The Guardian, wrote, "this often hilarious heartbreaker is simply Baumbach’s best film to date – insightful, sympathetic and rather beautifully bewildered." Kermode also compared the film to Annie Hall (1977), Kramer vs. Kramer (1979) and La Grande Illusion (1937). The film went on to receive six Academy Award nominations, including for Best Picture, and Best Original Screenplay. Driver and Johansson also received nominations in leading roles. Laura Dern won the Oscar for a supporting role. With the release of Marriage Story, it also made Baumbach one of the few screenwriters to ever sweep "The Big Four" critics awards: Los Angeles Film Critics Association, National Board of Review, New York Film Critics Circle, and National Society of Film Critics.

=== 2020–present: Adaptation and expansion ===
Baumbach's feature film White Noise was adapted from the 1985 novel of the same name by Don DeLillo. The film reunited him with Greta Gerwig and Adam Driver, and was released by Netflix on December 30, 2022. The film premiered at the 79th Venice International Film Festival where it competed for the Golden Lion. The film received mixed reviews. In 2023, Baumbach again collaborated with Gerwig, co-writing the screenplay for her film Barbie starring Margot Robbie, Ryan Gosling, and America Ferrera. The film released on July 21, 2023, to critical acclaim and grossed $1.4 billion worldwide. Baumbach and Gerwig received nominations for the Academy Award for Best Adapted Screenplay and BAFTA Award for Best Original Screenplay, and Golden Globe Award for Best Screenplay. Baumbach's unpublished memoir was acquired by Knopf in 2023.

Baumbach's fourth film for Netflix, Jay Kelly, was described as a "coming-of-age story about adults". Baumbach cast George Clooney and Adam Sandler. He co-wrote the film with actress Emily Mortimer and the film was produced by David Heyman and Amy Pascal. Netflix chairman Scott Stuber said: "Noah Baumbach's got an excellent kind of Jerry Maguire-esque, for lack of a better analogy, but a really great life-affirming movie with two big movie stars that's starting to come together, so that'll be exciting." It premiered at the 2025 Venice Film Festival.

On September 17, 2026, Variety reported that Baumbach signed a three-year, first-look agreement for features with Warner Bros., which takes effect in 2027. His first film under this deal is set to be released under the Warner Bros. Clockwork label and will be directed, written, and produced by Baumbach, as well as be produced by David Heyman and LuckyChap Entertainment.

== Style and influences ==
Baumbach noted that comedian and filmmaker Woody Allen was "an obvious influence", stating, "He was the single biggest pop culture influence on me". He has cited the films Manhattan, Zelig, and Broadway Danny Rose as influences on his work.

He has also cited Ernst Lubitsch, Max Ophüls, Jean Renoir, Robert Altman, Peter Bogdanovich, Spike Lee, Whit Stillman, Steven Spielberg, as well as the screwball comedies of the 1930s and 1940s, and the films of the French New Wave as influences. His favorite film of all time is E.T. the Extra-Terrestrial.

Baumbach is a fan of the "beautiful" music of electronic acts New Order and OMD, and sought to "do something that evoked" those bands on the soundtrack of Mistress America (2015). He has also cited David Bowie and Paul McCartney, and the film scores of Tangerine Dream and Georges Delerue, as important to him.

== Personal life ==
Baumbach met actress Jennifer Jason Leigh in 2001 while she was starring on Broadway in Proof. The couple married on September 2, 2005. They have a son, who was named after French director Éric Rohmer. Leigh filed for divorce from Baumbach on November 15, 2010, in Los Angeles, citing irreconcilable differences. The divorce was finalized in September 2013.

Baumbach's romantic relationship with actress, writer and director Greta Gerwig began late in 2011, their creative collaboration had begun some time earlier during the production of Greenberg. They have two sons, born March 2019 and February 2023. Twelve years into their relationship, Baumbach and Gerwig married at New York City Hall in December 2023.

Baumbach's brother Nico is a film theorist and associate professor at Columbia University's Center for Comparative Media and married to Pulitzer Prize winning playwright Annie Baker.

== Filmography ==
=== Film ===
Year	Title	Director	Writer	Producer	Notes
1995	Kicking and Screaming	Yes	Yes	No	Story co-written with Oliver Berkman
1997	Mr. Jealousy	Yes	Yes	No	
2000	Conrad & Butler Take a Vacation	Yes	Yes	No	Short film
2002	Highball	Yes	Yes	No	Shot in 1997; released pseudonymously
2004	The Life Aquatic with Steve Zissou	No	Yes	No	Co-written with Wes Anderson
2005	The Squid and the Whale	Yes	Yes	No	
2007	Margot at the Wedding	Yes	Yes	No	
2009	Alexander the Last	No	No	Yes	
2009	Fantastic Mr. Fox	No	Yes	No	Co-written with Wes Anderson
2010	Greenberg	Yes	Yes	No	Story co-written with Jennifer Jason Leigh
2012	Madagascar 3: Europe's Most Wanted	No	Yes	No	Co-written with Eric Darnell
2012	Frances Ha	Yes	Yes	Yes	Co-written with Greta Gerwig
2014	While We're Young	Yes	Yes	Yes	
2014	She's Funny that Way	No	No	Executive	
2015	Mistress America	Yes	Yes	Yes	Co-written with Greta Gerwig
2015	De Palma	Yes	—N/a	Yes	Documentary film; co-directed with Jake Paltrow
2017	The Meyerowitz Stories	Yes	Yes	Yes	
2019	Marriage Story	Yes	Yes	Yes	
2022	White Noise	Yes	Yes	Yes	
2023	Barbie	No	Yes	Executive	Co-written with Greta Gerwig
2025	Jay Kelly	Yes	Yes	Yes	Co-written with Emily Mortimer

Acting roles

Year	Title	Role
1995	Kicking and Screaming	Danny
1997	Highball	Philip
1997	Mr. Jealousy	Arliss
2004	The Life Aquatic with Steve Zissou	Phillip
2025	Jay Kelly	Director (cameo)

=== Television ===
Year	Title	Director	Writer	Notes
2000	Thirty	No	Yes	TV movie
2012	The Corrections	Yes	Yes	TV pilot

== Awards and nominations ==
Baumbach has been nominated for four Academy Awards for the films The Squid and the Whale (2005), Marriage Story (2019), and Barbie (2023).

He has also received nominations from the Golden Globe Awards, British Academy Film Awards, Critics Choice Movie Awards, Cannes Film Festival, Venice Film Festival and Writers Guild of America Awards. He has been nominated for five Independent Spirit Film Awards and received two wins.

Year	Title	Academy Awards		BAFTA Awards		Golden Globe Awards	
Year	Title	Nominations	Wins	Nominations	Wins	Nominations	Wins
2005	The Squid and the Whale	1				3	
2012	Frances Ha					1	
2019	Marriage Story	6	1	5	1	6	1
2022	White Noise					1	
2025	Jay Kelly					2	
Total		7	1	5	1	13	1

== Bibliography ==
- Baumbach, Noah (November 29, 1999). "Keith Richards' desert-island disks". Shouts & Murmurs. The New Yorker.
