= Kicking and Screaming (1995 film) =

Film by Noah Baumbach

- Theatrical release poster
- Directed by: Noah Baumbach
- Screenplay by: Noah Baumbach
- Story by: Noah Baumbach; Oliver Berkman
- Produced by: Joel Castleberg
- Starring: Josh Hamilton; Olivia d'Abo; Chris Eigeman; Parker Posey; Jason Wiles; Cara Buono; Carlos Jacott; Elliott Gould; Eric Stoltz
- Cinematography: Steven Bernstein
- Edited by: J. Kathleen Gibson
- Music by: Phil Marshall
- Distributed by: Trimark Pictures
- Release dates: October 4, 1995 (NYFF); October 6, 1995 (United States)
- Running time: 96 minutes
- Country: United States
- Language: English
- Budget: $1.3 million
- Box office: $718,490

Kicking and Screaming is a 1995 American romantic comedy-drama film written and directed by Noah Baumbach in his feature directorial debut. The film stars Josh Hamilton, Olivia d'Abo, Parker Posey, Chris Eigeman, and Eric Stoltz.

== Premise ==
A group of college graduates in the fictional town of Munton refuse to move on with their lives, each in their own peculiar way.

== Cast ==
- Josh Hamilton as Grover Cary
- Olivia d'Abo as Jane
- Chris Eigeman as Max Belmont
- Parker Posey as Miami
- Jason Wiles as Skippy
- Cara Buono as Kate
- Carlos Jacott as Otis
- Elliott Gould as Grover's dad
- Eric Stoltz as Chet
- Noah Baumbach as Danny
- Perrey Reeves as Amy
- Dean Cameron as Zach
- Marissa Ribisi as Charlotte
- Jessica Hecht as the ticket woman

== Production ==
Much of the film was shot at Occidental College in Los Angeles.

Jason Blum, Baumbach's college roommate who was producing a film for the first time, obtained financing after receiving a letter from family acquaintance Steve Martin endorsing the script. Blum attached the letter to copies of the script he sent around Hollywood.

== Reception and legacy ==
Kicking and Screaming received mostly positive reviews, with many critical assessments describing it as remarkably competent for a directorial and writing debut, expecting that Baumbach would "graduate to better things."

Roger Ebert praised the film's "good eye and a terrific ear; the dialogue by writer-director Noah Baumbach is not simply accurate... but a distillation of reality–elevating pointless brainy small-talk into a statement." Reviews often mentioned the thin and meandering plot, but most noted this as a facet of the characters' life stage. Janet Maslin of The New York Times stated, "Kicking and Screaming occupies its postage-stamp size terrain with confident comic style."

According to Kevin Thomas of the Los Angeles Times, "You begin to wonder why you're bothering to watch the aimless lives of these four unfold... At 25 he may be too close to the material to achieve the detachment from which irony and meaning flow." In a 2020 retrospective article, Nathan Dunne of The Guardian wrote the film is "a charming distillation of 90s slacker posturing and the tedium of a quarter-life crisis."

The film premiered in 1995 at the New York Film Festival to critical acclaim. Baumbach was chosen as one of Newsweek's "Ten New Faces of 1996". The Criterion Collection released the film on DVD on August 22, 2006, in the United States.

On the review aggregator website Rotten Tomatoes, 56% of 36 critics' reviews are positive. Metacritic, which uses a weighted average, assigned the film a score of 75 out of 100, based on 18 critics, indicating "generally favorable" reviews.
