= USS High Ball (SP-947) =

Patrol vessel of the United States Navy

History

United States
- Name: USS High Ball
- Namesake: Previous name retained
- Completed: 1910
- Acquired: 21 May 1917
- Commissioned: 1 June 1917
- Fate: Returned to owner 21 May 1919
- Notes: Operated as private motorboat High Ball 1910–1917 and from 1919

General characteristics
- Type: Patrol vessel
- Length: 45 ft (14 m)
- Beam: 6 ft 6 in (1.98 m)
- Draft: 2 ft 6 in (0.76 m)
- Speed: 35 knots
- Complement: 12
- Armament: 1 × machine gun

The first USS High Ball (SP-947) was a United States Navy patrol vessel in commission from 1917 to 1919.

High Ball was built as a private motorboat of the same name in 1910. On 21 May 1917, the U.S. Navy acquired her from her owner, W. J. Green of Utica, New York, for use as a section patrol boat during World War I. She was commissioned at the New York Navy Yard in Brooklyn, New York, as USS High Ball (SP-947) on 1 June 1917.

Assigned to the 3rd Naval District, High Ball served throughout her naval career as ship's tender to the monitor USS Amphitrite (Monitor No. 2) in New York Harbor. For a brief period in late 1918, she was one of two boats named High Ball in U.S. Navy service, the other being USS High Ball (1905).

High Ball was returned to Green on 21 May 1919.
