= USS High Ball (1905) =

United States patrol vessel during World War I

History

United States
- Name: USS High Ball or Highball
- Namesake: Previous name retained
- Completed: 1905
- Acquired: November 1918
- Fate: Returned to owner 2 December 1918
- Notes: Operated as private motorboat High Ball or Highball prior to November 1918 and from December 1918

General characteristics
- Type: Patrol vessel

The second USS High Ball, also written Highball, was a United States Navy patrol vessel acquired briefly in late 1918.

High Ball was built as a private motorboat of the same name in 1905. In November 1918, the U.S. Navy acquired her from her owner, W. W. Smithers of Cape May, New Jersey, as a section patrol boat during World War I. Unlike most civilian boats and craft taken into U.S. Navy service for use as patrol boats during World War I, High Ball never received a section patrol number. She became one of two boats in U.S. Navy service then, the other being USS High Ball (SP-947).

High Ball briefly was assigned to the 4th Naval District. The end of World War I on 11 November 1918 led the Navy to return High Ball to Smithers on 2 December 1918.
