= Mr. Jealousy =

- Directed by: Noah Baumbach
- Written by: Noah Baumbach
- Produced by: Joel Kastelberg
- Starring: Eric Stoltz; Annabella Sciorra
- Cinematography: Steven Bernstein
- Edited by: J. Kathleen Gibson
- Music by: Robert Een; Luna
- Production company: Joel Castleberg Productions
- Distributed by: Lions Gate Films
- Release dates: September 11, 1997 (TIFF); June 5, 1998 (United States)
- Running time: 103 minutes
- Country: United States
- Language: English
- Box office: $301,796

Mr. Jealousy is a 1997 American romantic comedy film written and directed by Noah Baumbach and starring Eric Stoltz and Annabella Sciorra.

== Plot ==
Aspiring writer Lester Grimm starts going out with Ramona Ray after being introduced by Lester's friend Vince and Vince's fiancée Lucretia. They immediately hit it off, but Ramona mentions on their first date that one of her ex-boyfriends is famous writer Dashiell Frank. Lester becomes slightly jealous.

One day Lester is walking down the street and he spots Dashiell and follows him. He then notices how Dashiell goes to group therapy. He then joins the group, pretending that he is actually his friend, Vince. After several sessions with the group and Dr. Poke, Dashiell is complaining about how he has never been faithful when Lester bursts out with some criticism that shocks everyone.

After a couple more sessions, Lester decides to leave the therapy group, which Vince strongly advises against, as he had asked Lester to talk about him to get some personal advice. Vince then convinces Lester to stay for two more sessions, where Lester continues to 'fight' Dashiell. During one particular session, Dashiell is talking about a character in one of his books, and says that it was based on a true person. We are then led to believe that he is talking about Ramona.

Lester still continues with the group therapy, even after the two sessions that he said was his last. After a session, Dashiell asks Lester if he would like to go for a drink. They go to a bar where they drink scotch and Dashiell reveals that he likes their arguments in therapy, since no one else speaks their minds. Lester had arranged to meet Ramona after the session, but has forgotten about it, while Dashiell and Lester become friends. When Lester goes to Ramona's house later, and apologizes for not meeting her, he lies and said that he went to see The Man Who Shot Liberty Valance, and that it was shot in color, although if he had seen the film he would have known it was in black and white.

Dashiell invites Lester to come over to his house for a drink, and he agrees. Here we meet Irene, Dashiell's girlfriend.

After the meeting, Lester and Ramona are lying on the bed, where Ramona reveals that a past boyfriend, Steven, had come over and that they had had sex, but that it was before she and Lester were serious. She then says that her relationship with Steven is over, and that the sex hadn't meant anything.

Later, when Lester is having dinner at Ramona's house, Ramona reveals her sexual past, which proves that she couldn't be the character that Dashiell had described earlier. They then talk about the first time they slept together, which leads to an argument.

At the next therapy session, the true Vince joins the group, under a fake name as 'Leo' and adopts a British accent for the therapy. Vince then reveals Lester's problems to the group, but says that they are his own, even though Lester objects. After the session they have an argument.

In another session, Dashiell reveals that he had met Ramona coincidentally after a meeting, and that they had had sex. Lester then walks out of the session, to find Ramona. She is outside and they have an argument in the street, while the rest of the group come out to see what happens. All of the lies are revealed, and Dashiell punches Lester. Lester begins to walk away, then turns around, walks up to Dashiell and says "She's my girlfriend", and punches him. Lester and Ramona argue and break up.

Several months later, at the Iowa Writer's Workshop, Lester is working on his writing, and back in New York, Ramona has been going to Dr. Poke for therapy. The scene then shifts to Vince and Lucretia's wedding, where Lester and Ramona see each other. Lester outstretches his hand, asking Ramona to dance. At first she hesitates, saying how long it had taken for her to get over him, and he agrees. He then outstretches his hand again, and this time she accepts.

== Cast ==
- Eric Stoltz as Lester Grimm
- Annabella Sciorra as Ramona Ray
- Chris Eigeman as Dashiell Frank
- Carlos Jacott as Vince
- Marianne Jean-Baptiste as Lucretia
- Brian Kerwin as Stephen
- John Lehr as Lint
- Peter Bogdanovich as Dr. Howard Poke
- Martha Gehman as Marilyn
- Noah Baumbach as Arliss
- Eddie Kaye Thomas as Nat
- Bridget Fonda as Irene

== Reception ==
Review aggregator Rotten Tomatoes gave the film a score of 71% based on 14 reviews, with an average rating of 6.6/10. On Metacritic, the film has a score of 61 out of 100 based on 17 reviews, indicating "generally favorable reviews".
