= The Meyerowitz Stories =

2017 film by Noah Baumbach

The Meyerowitz Stories (New and Selected)
- Film release poster
- Directed by: Noah Baumbach
- Written by: Noah Baumbach
- Produced by: Scott Rudin; Noah Baumbach; Lila Yacoub; Eli Bush
- Starring: Adam Sandler; Ben Stiller; Dustin Hoffman; Emma Thompson
- Cinematography: Robbie Ryan
- Edited by: Jennifer Lame
- Music by: Randy Newman
- Production companies: IAC Films; Scott Rudin Productions
- Distributed by: Netflix
- Release dates: May 21, 2017 (Cannes); October 14, 2017 (United States)
- Running time: 112 minutes
- Country: United States
- Language: English
- Budget: $11.4 million
- Box office: ~$20,000

The Meyerowitz Stories (New and Selected) is a 2017 American comedy-drama film directed and written by Noah Baumbach. The film stars Adam Sandler, Ben Stiller, Dustin Hoffman, Elizabeth Marvel and Emma Thompson, and follows a group of dysfunctional adult siblings trying to live in the shadow of their father.

The Meyerowitz Stories was selected to compete for the Palme d'Or in the main competition section, and also won the Palm Dog award at the 2017 Cannes Film Festival. It received positive reviews from critics, who praised Baumbach's script and direction, as well as the performances, with Sandler especially singled out for praise. It was released in theaters and for streaming by Netflix October 14, 2017.

The film was the second Netflix film competing at Cannes, with Okja, which caused a clash with jury president Pedro Almodóvar, who argued that Cannes Film Festival films should be made for big screens, not online streaming. In 2017, the Cannes Film Festival announced a new rule that requires a film competing at Cannes to "commit itself to being distributed in French movie theatres". A French law mandates that films cannot be shown on streaming services for 36 months after their theatrical release, effectively blocking Netflix films from future festivals.

== Plot ==
After separating from his wife, unemployed Danny Meyerowitz moves in with his father, Harold, a retired Bard College art professor and sculptor, and his fourth wife, Maureen, a pleasant but foggy hippie. Jean is his sister, and they have a younger half-brother, Matthew. Danny is close to his daughter, Eliza, a freshman film student at Bard. Eliza sends one of her sexually provocative films to the family, discomforting them.

Some of Harold's work has been selected as part of a faculty group show at Bard, but he refuses to be part of a group show. Danny and Harold attend the MoMA retrospective of a friend and contemporary of Harold's, the successful L.J. Shapiro. There, neither father nor son feels comfortable; Harold feels that the art world has forgotten him, and chooses to literally run away down the street. Danny meets Shapiro's daughter, single mother Loretta, but is forced to leave to chase after Harold.

Harold's younger son, Matthew, a successful financial advisor to rock stars on the West Coast in Los Angeles, is in New York on business, and meets Harold for lunch with an accountant friend. Matthew discusses raising his young son after separating from his wife, neither of whom Harold knows. They try to convince Harold to sell his Manhattan home and its sculpture. Harold tells them that the decision to sell the house is a private family decision, and walks out. At a third restaurant, he criticizes the prices, but orders lavishly when Matthew says he will pay.

During lunch at the restaurant, Harold feels offended by the arrogant manner of another patron, and gets Matthew to chase him when he alleges that the patron swapped jackets with him. Although mistaken, father and son bond slightly in self-righteous indignation. That evening, they pay a visit to Matthew's mother and Harold's second wife, Julia, who has since married a man named Cody, a wealthy philistine. She tells them that she is sorry that she was not a better mother to Danny and Jean; her directness makes them uncomfortable, and they are eager to leave. Matthew resents Harold for preferring a life of art over money. "I beat you!", he screams at his father's departing Volvo.

Harold is diagnosed with a chronic subdural hematoma. He enters the hospital, where, as the days pass, his children learn to manage his care, after first leaning on Harold's doctor and nurse to do it. Matthew and Maureen agree to sell the house that the latter grew up in without consulting anyone else in the family. Outside the hospital, Jean tells her brothers that Harold's friend Paul, who happens to be visiting at the moment, exposed himself and masturbated in front of her when she was a teenager. Upset with the revelation, Matthew and Danny damage Paul's car with mounting exhilaration. Jean expresses her disappointment in her brothers, having wanted someone to just listen to her instead of doing such damage without her consent.

At Bard, representing their father at the faculty group show, Matthew and Danny argue over Eliza drinking alcohol, which turns into a fight about Harold's favoritism of Matthew and Matthew's estrangement from the rest of the family. Later, bloody and crying, Matthew ends up breaking down emotionally during his speech as he realizes he'll never achieve closure with Harold if he dies now.

Danny undergoes surgery for his persistent limp, something his daughter and siblings had urged him to seek treatment for. As Harold convalesces at Maureen's place in the country (the townhouse was sold, despite Matthew's change of heart), it dawns on Matthew and Harold that Harold's favorite sculpture, titled "Matthew", a lifelong object of resentment for Danny and Jean, was likely based on his feelings for young Danny.

Danny, who until now has been solicitous toward his father, refuses to care for him while Maureen is away, and accepts his brother's offer of a trip to California, but he forgives him for his failures as a dad. On the way to the flight, he meets Loretta, now single, and she suggests that they go together to the screening of a film that Eliza has made. In the basement of The Whitney, Eliza uncovers her grandfather's sculpture, long believed to have been lost.

== Cast ==
- Adam Sandler as Danny Meyerowitz, Harold's son and Matthews’ half brother. After separating from his wife, he moved in with his father.
- Ben Stiller as Matthew Meyerowitz, Danny's half-brother and Harold's son. A successful financier who lives across the country and is currently separated from his wife, who he suspects has a new boyfriend.
- Dustin Hoffman as Harold Meyerowitz, a moderately successful sculptor and retired college professor. He has been married four times.
- Emma Thompson as Maureen, Harold's fourth wife, an alcoholic hippie.
- Elizabeth Marvel as Jean Meyerowitz, Danny's sister and Matthew's half-sister, and Harold's daughter.
- Grace Van Patten as Eliza Meyerowitz, Danny's daughter and film student who makes provocative short films.
- Daniel Flaherty as Marcus, Eliza's boyfriend.
- Candice Bergen as Julia, Harold's third wife and Matthew's mother.
- Adam Driver as Randy, one of Matthew's clients.
- Sigourney Weaver as herself.
- Judd Hirsch as L.J. Shapiro, a successful artist and Harold's old friend.
- Rebecca Miller as Loretta Shapiro, L.J.'s daughter.
- Josh Hamilton as Loretta's friend
- Matthew Shear as Gabe, Matthew's colleague.
- Jared Sandler as a college kid.
- Greta Gerwig as Victoria (voice only)

== Production ==
Principal photography on the film began March 7, 2016, in New York City. Hospital footage was filmed at Phelps Memorial Hospital Center in Sleepy Hollow, New York, and Lenox Hill Hospital in Manhattan. The scenes of Bard College were actually filmed at Sarah Lawrence College in Bronxville, New York. Production concluded May 9, 2016.

During production, the film was known by the working title, Yeh Din Ka Kissa ("The Tale of This Day" in Hindi).

== Release ==
In April 2017, Netflix acquired distribution rights to the film. It had its world premiere at the Cannes Film Festival May 21, 2017, where it received a four-minute standing ovation.

The film was released in select theaters and for streaming on Netflix October 13, 2017.

Although Netflix does not publicly disclose box-office results of its films, IndieWire estimated that The Meyerowitz Stories made approximately $20,000 in its opening weekend, a figure that the site noted as impressive, considering it was released simultaneously for streaming.

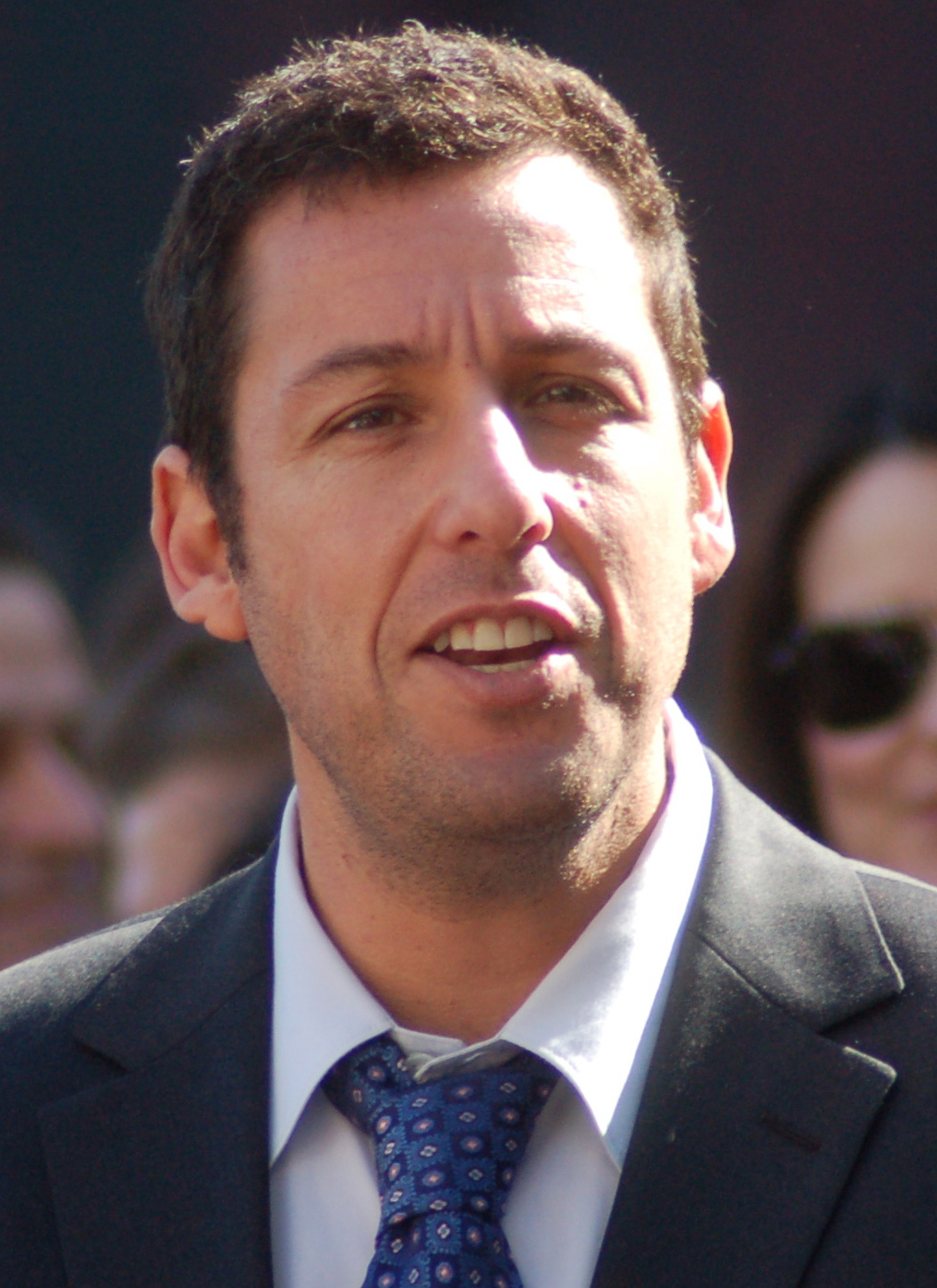
Adam Sandler garnered acclaim for his performance, with many critics calling it one of the best of his career.

=== Critical response ===
On the review aggregator website, Rotten Tomatoes, the film holds an approval rating of 92%, based on 189 reviews, and an average rating of 7.6/10. The website's consensus reads: "The Meyerowitz Stories (New and Selected) observes the family dynamic through writer-director Noah Baumbach's bittersweet lens and the impressive efforts of a remarkable cast." On Metacritic, the film has a weighted average score of 79 out of 100, based on 41 critics, indicating "generally favorable reviews".

Richard Roeper of the Chicago Sun-Times gave the film 3.5 stars out of 4, and praised the cast and script, saying: "They're a smart and sophisticated and relatively privileged bunch, but they're miserable and ridiculous, which makes for some poignant insights and some sharp comedy. We enjoy the Meyerowitz clan, even as we praise the heavens we're not like them and we don't live next door to any of 'em."

Writing for Rolling Stone, Peter Travers also gave the film 3.5 stars out of 4. He wrote, "Noah Baumbach's funny, literate story gives Dustin Hoffman, Adam Sandler and Ben Stiller plum roles – and may be the best thing he's ever done."

Peter Debruge of Variety gave the film a positive review, calling it the best Netflix film to date, and praising Sandler's performance, writing: "With no shtick to fall back on, Sandler is forced to act, and it's a glorious thing to watch – even for those fans who like him best in perpetual man-child mode (don't worry: the character is a full-grown variation on that familiar Sandler prototype)." Other critics were equal with their praise of Sandler, with various outlets calling his performance a "triumph", "miraculously great", and that "it's time to admit that Adam Sandler is actually a good actor".

=== Accolades ===
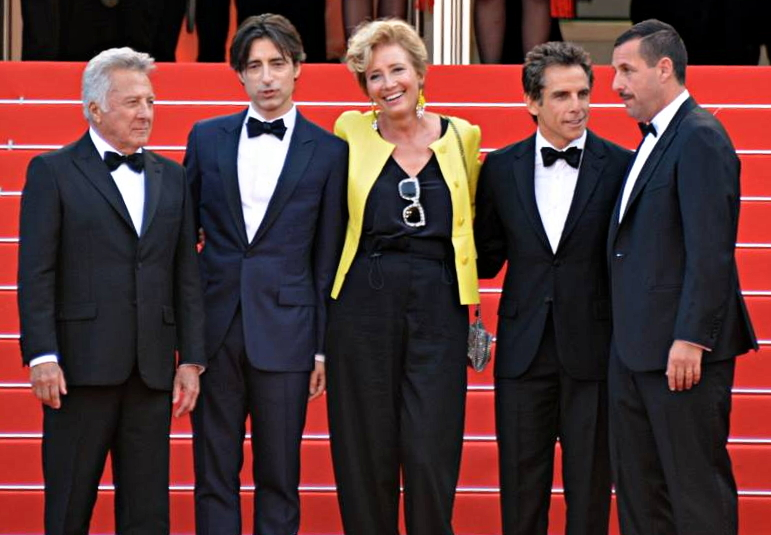
Dustin Hoffman, Noah Baumbach, Emma Thompson, Ben Stiller and Adam Sandler at the Cannes Film Festival screening of The Meyerowitz Stories in 2017

Year	Award	Category	Recipient(s)	Result	Ref.
2017	Boston Society of Film Critics	Best Cast	The cast of The Meyerowitz Stories	Won	
2017	Cannes Film Festival	Palme D'Or	Noah Baumbach	Nominated	
2017	Cannes Film Festival	Palm Dog Award	Einstein	Won	
2018	Critics' Choice Movie Awards	Best Actor in a Comedy	Adam Sandler	Nominated	
2018	Evening Standard British Film Awards	Best Supporting Actress	Emma Thompson	Nominated	
2017	Gotham Independent Film Awards	Best Actor	Adam Sandler	Nominated	
2017	Hollywood Film Awards	Hollywood Comedy Award	Adam Sandler	Won	
2018	Humanitas Prize	Feature – Comedy	Noah Baumbach	Nominated	
2018	Golden Tomato Awards	Best Comedy Movie 2017	The Meyerowitz Stories	5th Place	
2018	Satellite Awards	Best Supporting Actor – Motion Picture	Dustin Hoffman	Nominated	
