= Greenberg (film) =

2010 film by Noah Baumbach

- Theatrical release poster
- Directed by: Noah Baumbach
- Screenplay by: Noah Baumbach
- Story by: Jennifer Jason Leigh; Noah Baumbach
- Produced by: Scott Rudin; Jennifer Jason Leigh
- Starring: Ben Stiller; Greta Gerwig; Rhys Ifans; Jennifer Jason Leigh
- Cinematography: Harris Savides
- Edited by: Tim Streeto
- Music by: James Murphy
- Production company: Scott Rudin Productions
- Distributed by: Focus Features
- Release dates: February 14, 2010 (Berlinale); March 19, 2010 (United States)
- Running time: 107 minutes
- Country: United States
- Language: English
- Budget: $25 million
- Box office: $7 million

Greenberg is a 2010 American romantic comedy-drama film directed by Noah Baumbach, who wrote the screenplay and co-wrote the story with his then-wife Jennifer Jason Leigh. The film stars Ben Stiller, Greta Gerwig, Rhys Ifans, and Leigh, with Mark Duplass, Merritt Wever, Chris Messina, Brie Larson, Juno Temple, Jake Paltrow, and Dave Franco in supporting roles. The film's soundtrack features the first film score by James Murphy.

The film had its world premiere at the 60th Berlin International Film Festival on February 14, 2010. Distributed by Focus Features, Greenberg began a limited theatrical release in New York City and Los Angeles on March 19, 2010, followed by a wide release in the United States on March 26. It received positive reviews from critics and grossed $7 million worldwide against a budget of $25 million.

== Plot ==
Florence Marr is a personal assistant to the Greenberg family in Hollywood Hills. Before the family leaves on a trip to Vietnam, Phillip Greenberg explains his brother Roger will be staying at the house, ostensibly to build a doghouse for their pet German Shepherd, Mahler. Phillip's wife, Carol, confides that Roger has been recently released from a psychiatric hospital after a nervous breakdown.

Arriving from New York City, Roger has an awkward encounter with Florence. He spends his time building the doghouse, watching neighbors swim in the Greenbergs' pool, and writing various letters of complaint. His Welsh friend Ivan Schrank invites him to a party at the home of their former bandmate Eric Beller, where Roger is uncomfortable and Eric is openly hostile. Roger encounters Beth, an ex-girlfriend, explaining he is in Los Angeles to simply do nothing for a while.

Roger calls Florence to meet for a drink. He does not drive, so she picks him up, stopping at her apartment for her purse. They begin to have sex, but Florence stops him, having just come out of a long relationship and not wanting to have meaningless sex. Roger suggests they keep things platonic, and she agrees, but they remain drawn to each other.

Over dinner, Eric vents that Roger declined a major record deal for their band 15 years earlier. He marvels that Ivan, devastated by losing the contract, still speaks to him.

Noticing the dog Mahler is lethargic, Roger calls Florence to take Mahler to a veterinarian, where they learn he has an autoimmune disease. Their relationship soon escalates, with Florence falling for Roger despite his outbursts and awkwardness.

Roger meets Beth for drinks and recalls minute details from their time together, which she barely remembers. She leaves abruptly when Roger tries to rekindle their relationship.

After Florence and Roger finally have sex, he yells at her for pursuing him when he does not want to become involved. The next day, a remorseful Roger calls Florence, who confesses that she is due to have an abortion the following day. Roger offers to take her; since he does not drive, Ivan drives them to the clinic, where she undergoes general anaesthesia and stays overnight.

Back at the house, Roger's college-aged niece Sara visits. Leaving for Australia in the morning with her friend Muriel, they throw a house party with dozens of their friends, with whom Roger does drugs. Ivan arrives and gets into an argument with Roger, finally voicing his feelings over their lost record deal. Roger confesses he had no idea his personal concerns would end the band, for which he feels immense guilt. They bemoan that they have ended up in lives they did not plan to have, though Ivan has made peace with his. Having learned from Florence that Roger had been hospitalized, and having been through a similar experience himself, Ivan laments that they could have helped each other. He leaves, declaring that they never truly talk, and saddened that Roger never made an effort to know Ivan's son. Dejected and inebriated, Roger leaves a long voicemail for Florence, confessing that he really likes her.

The next day, Roger accepts Sara and Muriel's invitation to accompany them to Australia. He convinces the neighbors to take care of Mahler, but on the way to the airport, he changes his mind. Instead, he goes to meet Florence at the clinic, and they return to her apartment. There, she listens to Roger's voicemail.

== Cast ==
- Ben Stiller as Roger Greenberg
- Greta Gerwig as Florence Marr
- Rhys Ifans as Ivan Schrank
- Jennifer Jason Leigh as Beth
- Mark Duplass as Eric Beller
- Merritt Wever as Gina
- Chris Messina as Phillip Greenberg
- Brie Larson as Sara
- Juno Temple as Muriel
- Susan Traylor as Carol Greenberg
- Jake Paltrow as Johno
- Dave Franco as Rich

== Production ==
The story was developed by Jennifer Jason Leigh and Noah Baumbach. In a departure from Baumbach's previous New York-set films, the story was to be set in Los Angeles.

Ben Stiller was cast as the titular Greenberg, having been a fan of Baumbach's work. Stiller said, "Noah's work is very detailed and goes into specifics on the characters; it's all written on the page. We rehearsed a lot; it really has to be said as written. So there was hardly any improvisation on the shoot and that was exciting — not having the burden of having to come up with something to try to make it better. What I had to do was to make sure that I would get the rhythm of his dialogue, his lines, to work. Some sequences — 4–6 pages in the script — were like doing little plays." The film was the first of multiple collaborations between Stiller and Baumbach.

Principal photography was completed within seven weeks. Specific Los Angeles locations were written into the film, including Lucy's El Adobe restaurant, the Runyon Canyon hiking trails, the Fairfax district along Melrose Avenue, and the Highland Gardens Hotel.

== Soundtrack ==
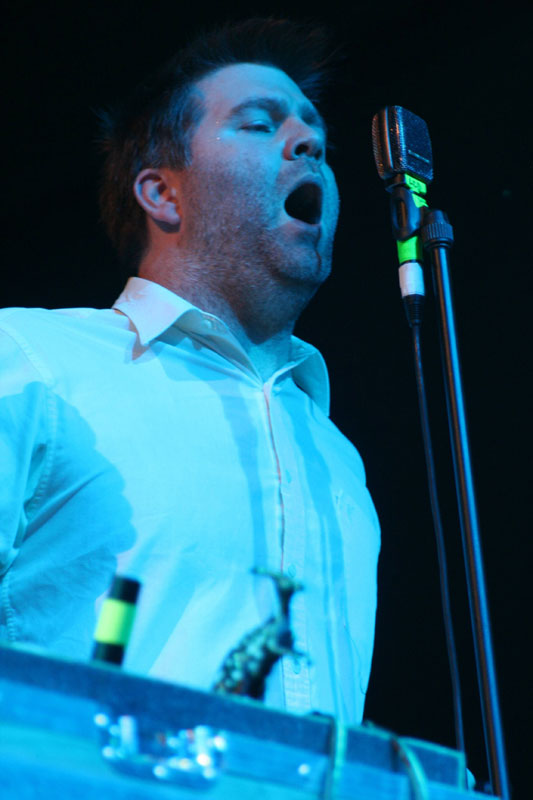
"Sounds nothing like LCD, really, which cracks us [Baumbach and him] both up."—James Murphy

The soundtrack is arranged by DFA Records co-founder James Murphy. It is Murphy's debut film score, and it includes original compositions credited to Murphy, his band LCD Soundsystem as well as songs by other artists. The film itself contained 25 unique songs, leaving 8 out of the soundtrack.

Track listing

1. Steve Miller Band: "Jet Airliner"
2. James Murphy: "People"
3. Nite Jewel: "Suburbia"
4. James Murphy: "Sleepy Baby"
5. James Murphy: "Thumbs"
6. Albert Hammond: "It Never Rains in Southern California"
7. James Murphy: "Plenty of Time"
8. James Murphy: "Photographs"
9. James Murphy: "Gente"
10. Galaxie 500: "Strange"
11. LCD Soundsystem: "Oh You (Christmas Blues)"
12. James Murphy: "Birthday Song"
13. James Murphy: "Dear You"
14. The Sonics: "Shot Down"
15. Duran Duran: "The Chauffeur"
16. James Murphy: "If You Need a Friend"
17. James Murphy : "Please Don't Follow Me"
18. James Murphy: "Photographs (Piano)"

== Reception ==
=== Critical response ===
On the review aggregator website Rotten Tomatoes, the film holds an approval rating of 76% based on 174 reviews, with an average rating of 6.7/10. The website's critics consensus reads, "Greenberg's title character is harder to like than most, but Ben Stiller's nuanced performance and a darkly funny script help take the misanthropic edge off." On Metacritic, the film has a weighted average score of 76 out of 100, based on 39 critics, indicating "generally favorable" reviews.

Roger Ebert gave the film three-and-a-half stars out of four. Ebert praised Stiller's performance and wrote: "I never knew who Ben Stiller was born to play, but now I do." Peter Travers of Rolling Stone magazine, gave the film three out of four stars and wrote, "Writer-director Noah Baumbach [...] walks the fragile line between humor and heartbreak. [...] Even when you laugh, like in the climactic party scene, it hurts." Ann Hornaday of The Washington Post called the film "a quietly funny portrait of grown-ups growing up" and gave it three out of four stars. Hornaday praised the lead performances, noting "Stiller inhabits his character's neuroses so thoroughly that it's easy to forget what a challenge it is to make such misanthropy the least bit compelling" and said Gerwig "proves her bona fides here as a fine, engaging young actress."

In a mixed review, Kurt Loder of MTV News wrote, "The movie is set up as a quirky romance between two lost souls, but in the end it seems more like a stalemate than a love match." David Edelstein of New York magazine lamented: "Greenberg would be a heckuva movie if we could just get Greenberg out of there."

=== Accolades ===
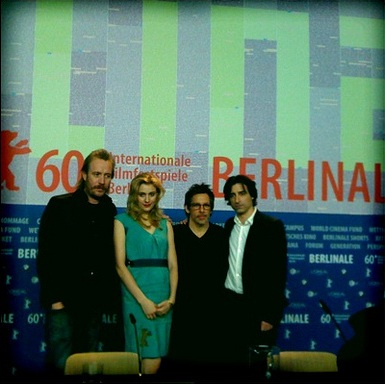
Rhys Ifans, Greta Gerwig, Ben Stiller, and Noah Baumbach promoting the film at the 60th Berlin International Film Festival

Award	Year	Category	Recipient	Result	Ref(s)
Berlin International Film Festival	2010	Golden Bear Award for Best Film	Noah Baumbach	Nominated	
Gotham Independent Film Awards	2010	Breakthrough Actor	Greta Gerwig	Nominated	
National Board of Review Awards	2010	Top Ten Independent Films	Greenberg	Won	
Independent Spirit Awards	2011	Best Feature	Greenberg	Nominated	
Independent Spirit Awards	2011	Best Male Lead	Ben Stiller	Nominated	
Independent Spirit Awards	2011	Best Female Lead	Greta Gerwig	Nominated	
Independent Spirit Awards	2011	Best Cinematography	Harris Savides	Nominated	
