= Emma Norton (producer) =

Film and television producer

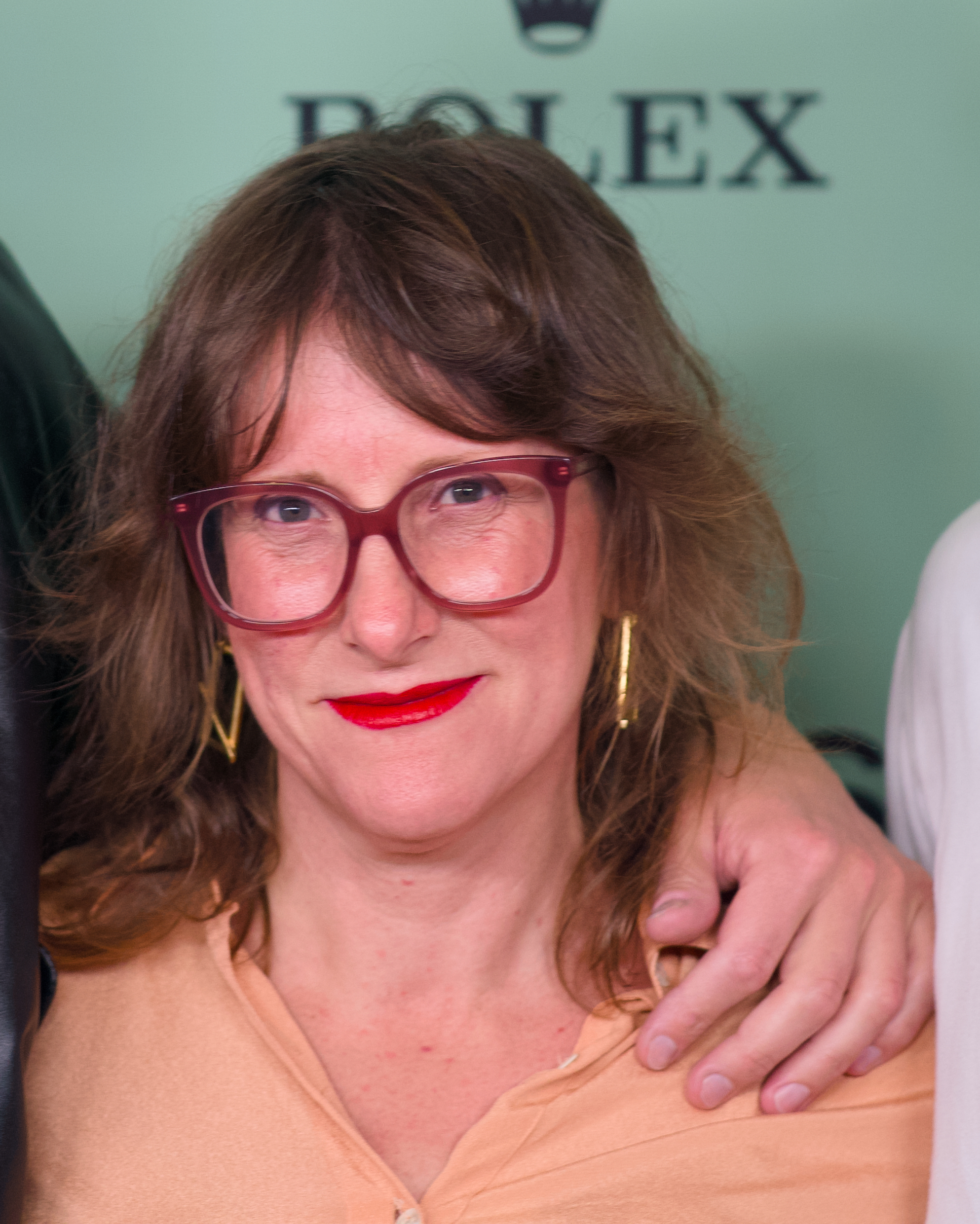
- Norton at the 2025 New York Film Festival
- Occupations: Film and television producer
- Known for: Normal People; Conversations with Friends; The Dry; The Eternal Daughter; Pillion
- Spouse: Malcolm Campbell
- Children: 2

Emma Norton is a film and television producer associated with Element Pictures. She is known for executive producing the television dramas Normal People (2020), Conversations with Friends (2022) and The Dry (2022—). She has also produced the feature films Rosie (2018), The Souvenir Part II (2021), The Eternal Daughter (2022) and Pillion (2025), the latter of which premiered in Un Certain Regard at the 2025 Cannes Film Festival where it won the section's Best Screenplay award.

== Career ==
Norton has held senior development and production roles at Element Pictures. In 2018 she was promoted to development producer after seven years as head of development at the company.

She served as an executive producer on the adaptation of Sally Rooney's novel Normal People for BBC Three and Hulu, and returned as an executive producer on Conversations with Friends (2022) based on the novel of the same name. She is also an executive producer of the Irish comedy-drama series The Dry for RTÉ and ITVX.

Norton produced Paddy Breathnach's drama Rosie, which premiered at the 2018 Toronto International Film Festival. She also collaborated with Joanna Hogg as a producer on The Souvenir Part II (2021) and The Eternal Daughter (2022). She produced Pillion (2025), the debut feature of writer-director Harry Lighton, for Element Pictures with backing from BBC Film and the British Film Institute. The film premiered in Un Certain Regard at Cannes, where Lighton won Best Screenplay. A24 acquired U.S. distribution rights to the film.

== Personal life ==
Norton moved to Ireland to work for Element Pictures. The first film she worked on, "What Richard Did", was written by her husband, writer Malcolm Campbell.

== Filmography ==
Selected credits as producer include:

=== Film ===
Year	Title	Role	Director
2016	A Date for Mad Mary	Executive producer	Darren Thornton
2018	Rosie	Producer	Paddy Breathnach
2021	The Souvenir Part II	Producer	Joanna Hogg
2022	The Eternal Daughter	Producer	Joanna Hogg
2025	Pillion	Producer	Harry Lighton

=== Television ===
Year(s)	Title	Role	Network/Platform	Episodes
2020	Normal People	Executive producer	BBC Three / Hulu / RTÉ One	12
2022	Conversations with Friends	Executive producer	BBC Three / Hulu / RTÉ One	12
2022–present	The Dry	Executive producer	RTÉ / ITVX	16
