= Advance copy =

Book copy distributed before release

An advance copy—also known as an ARC (advance reading copy or advance review copy), ARE (advance reader's edition), reader's edition, or galley—is a free copy of a new book given out by a publisher before the book is widely available. ARCs are intended to generate reviews and publicity for the book in advance of its official publication date.

== Overview ==
Historically, publishers relied on traveling sales representatives to promote books by providing them with copies to showcase to potential buyers. By the 20th century, the practice evolved, and publishers began sending ARCs directly to reviewers and booksellers.

ARCs are distinct from proof copies, which are intended for authors, editors, and proofreaders. They may lack binding and cover art, and may be in a different format from the book's final version. The content of an ARC can also differ from the book's final content: it may have typos and other mistakes, and the manuscript may change in response to reader feedback. As a result, publishers often discourage reviewers from quoting directly from the ARC.

An ARC can also be distributed in electronic format, in which case it is called an eARC (electronic ARC), e-galley, or DRC (digital review copy). Websites such as NetGalley and Edelweiss provide eARCs that can be downloaded to mobile devices and e-readers such as the Kindle and Nook. These websites prompt users to leave a review on Amazon and Goodreads after they finish reading. In the case of the highly anticipated memoir Spare by Prince Harry, Duke of Sussex, publisher Random House declined to offer electronic ARCs to make the book's contents more difficult to copy.

According to Federal Trade Commission guidelines, book reviewers in the United States generally do not have to disclose that they received an ARC when writing a review, since these copies are given out for free. The exception to this is if the reviewer was paid to write the review or the ARC was given with the express understanding that a review would be written. However, some online reviewers on platforms like Goodreads choose to disclose this information, mainly for reasons of transparency.

== Role in marketing ==
ARCs are commonly sent to trade review publications such as Publishers Weekly, Library Journal, Booklist, and Kirkus Reviews. These publications produce reviews of upcoming books several months before their release date, helping libraries and bookstores make their purchases. Publishers typically send ARCs to these publications between four and six months before the book's expected release.

Publishers also send ARCs to media outlets (such as The New York Times, The New Yorker, and literary magazines) early enough so that a review can appear close to the book's release date. ARCs sent to these publications often include a letter and additional materials, such as a press release or an author biography, to convince recipients that the book is worthy of review. They may also include a review slip with the author's or publisher's contact information.

ARCs are distributed through other channels as well; for example, they may be given away at American Library Association conferences and other meetings of professional associations.

In recent years, publishers have evolved their ARC marketing strategy, distributing ARCs of highly anticipated releases to celebrities and book influencers on platforms such as TikTok and Instagram. Sarah Jessica Parker was photographed with an ARC of Intermezzo by Sally Rooney in summer 2024, ahead of the book's release date in September. The term "galley brag" has been coined to describe readers showing off their ARCs as a status symbol on social media. The publisher may label popular ARCs with a unique name and number for each recipient, creating a sense of exclusivity.

Beyond traditional publishing, ARCs are also used in self-publishing, in which case the author is responsible for finding reviewers and distributing copies.

== Collecting and sale ==
ARCs are often of interest to book collectors, who consider them to be distinct from a book's first edition. According to The Wall Street Journal, collecting ARCs is especially popular among "niche but passionate fan bases", such as readers of the fantasy, science fiction, and young adult literature genres.

Early 20th-century ARCs were rare, and were typically made from higher-quality materials. These older ARCs may include handwritten corrections and can provide insight into the author's writing and revision process. ARCs of classic works such as Cannery Row and The Old Man and the Sea have been listed for tens of thousands of dollars.

The sale of ARCs by readers and bookstores is controversial, since they are marked as "not for sale" by the publisher and the author does not earn a profit. According to Katie Moench of Book Riot, ethical questions around selling ARCs include whether the sale is before or after publication, as well as the amount of profit made by the seller. Amazon only allows the sale of ARCs of books that are out of print, although this is difficult to enforce in practice. Conversely, eBay is much more permissive with ARC sales, with some fetching hundreds of dollars for the seller.

== See also ==
- BookTok
