= Intermezzo (novel) =

2024 novel by Sally Rooney

- First edition cover
- Author: Sally Rooney
- Audio read by: Éanna Hardwicke
- Language: English
- Publisher: Faber & Faber
- Publication date: 24 September 2024
- Publication place: London
- Media type: Print (hardback), ebook, audiobook
- Pages: 448 pp.
- ISBN: 978-0-571-36546-3 (First edition hardback)
- Dewey Decimal: 823/.92
- LC Class: PR6118.O59 I58 2024

Intermezzo is the fourth novel by Irish author Sally Rooney, published by Faber & Faber on 24 September 2024. Set in Dublin and rural Ireland, the novel follows two brothers in the aftermath of their father's death: Ivan, a 22-year-old former chess prodigy who begins a relationship with Margaret, a 36-year-old arts programme director, and Peter, a 32-year-old human rights lawyer navigating complicated relationships with both his younger girlfriend Naomi and his ex-girlfriend Sylvia. The novel explores themes of grief, age-gap relationships, sibling dynamics, and power structures in romantic relationships.

The book was Rooney's first novel to centre on male protagonists and on relationships between men. Rooney developed the story from an initial scene of a chess exhibition at an arts centre, and from watching chess tutorials during the COVID-19 lockdowns. The title "Intermezzo" references both musical interludes and chess terminology.

Released with Faber's "biggest trade campaign ever", the novel became the fastest-selling book in Ireland in 2024. Reviews were largely favourable, particularly of its treatment of grief and of the brothers' relationship. Some reviewers found its tone precious or objected to its treatment of women, while others called it more philosophically ambitious than her earlier novels.

== Plot ==
The novel follows Ivan and Peter Koubek, two brothers living in Dublin, in the weeks after the death of their father. Ivan, a 22-year-old former chess prodigy whose once-promising career has stagnated, meets Margaret Kearns, a 36-year-old arts programme director, during a chess exhibition at a local arts centre. Their interaction develops into a passionate but discreet relationship, despite Margaret's concerns about their age difference.

Meanwhile, Peter, a 32-year-old human rights lawyer, is in a relationship with Naomi, a 23-year-old college student who supplements her income by selling explicit photos online and frequently relies on Peter for financial support. But Peter still harbours unresolved feelings for his close friend and ex-girlfriend Sylvia, a 32-year-old English professor, whose chronic pain following a car accident ended their relationship. Peter attempts to integrate himself into Naomi's social life but feels out of place among her friends. When he learns that Naomi has been arrested for squatting and evicted, he secures her release and invites her to stay at his apartment while she searches for a new home.

As Peter and Ivan meet for dinner, Ivan reveals his relationship with Margaret. Peter expresses disgust at their age gap, angering Ivan, who cuts off all communication. Sylvia confronts Peter over his hypocrisy, pointing out his relationship with Naomi. This prompts Peter to attempt reconciliation with Ivan, but he discovers he has been blocked. Meanwhile, Ivan and Margaret grow closer, professing their love for each other. She shares her past experiences, including a toxic marriage to Ricky, an alcoholic whose possessive behaviour drove them apart. Margaret's mother sided with Ricky during their divorce, a betrayal that deeply affected her; Ivan sympathises with Margaret.

Peter and Sylvia briefly consider rekindling their relationship, but Sylvia's chronic pain complicates physical intimacy. When Peter expresses guilt over his role in Sylvia's life, she rebukes him for using her to cope with his grief over his father's death. As Peter continues to care for Sylvia during a severe episode of her chronic pain, they briefly resume their sexual relationship, which leads Peter to believe Sylvia wants to reunite. He decides to end his relationship with Naomi. But Sylvia rejects Peter's attempt at reconciliation, accusing him of using her as an exit strategy and an excuse to escape his fear of being vulnerable in a new relationship. Embarrassed and chastened, Peter attempts to return to Naomi, who has been staying at his father's house in Kildare since the breakup.

While visiting the Kildare house with his dog, Alexei, Ivan meets Naomi, who reveals Peter's favourable opinion of him despite their estrangement. Naomi also discovers that Peter has not spoken about her to Ivan, deepening her concerns about their relationship. When Peter arrives unexpectedly while Naomi is away, he and Ivan have a heated argument about their father's reliance on Peter as a protector and Peter's history of bullying Ivan. The argument escalates into a physical altercation, leaving Ivan bloodied.

Seeking solace, Ivan confides in Margaret, revealing his struggles with grief and his rift with Peter. Moved by Ivan's vulnerability, Margaret declares her need for his love, and Ivan reassures her of his commitment to their relationship. Meanwhile, Peter returns to his apartment, where Sylvia and Naomi confront him about his behaviour. Sylvia apologises for misleading Peter into believing she wanted to reconcile romantically, while Naomi accuses him of sexual exploitation. Sylvia proposes an unconventional arrangement, suggesting that the three of them maintain connections in a way that accommodates their respective needs. Peter agrees, settling into a routine of domestic life with Naomi while spending evenings with Sylvia.

When Ivan shows promise of reviving his chess career, Peter attends one of his tournaments, where he meets Margaret. She intercedes on Peter's behalf, facilitating a reconciliation between the brothers. Ivan and Peter affirm their mutual respect and agree to reunite for Christmas.

== Background ==
The initial inspiration for Intermezzo came from Rooney imagining a simultaneous exhibition of chess at a small-town arts centre in western Ireland, where a woman working at the centre would observe a young chess player. After writing this scene, Rooney developed the character of Ivan, but found herself "stuck" until she realised Ivan had an older brother, Peter. This realisation provided the novel's central relationship and convinced her to proceed with the book.

During the COVID-19 lockdowns, Rooney's husband began playing online chess, and though she did not play herself, she watched chess tutorials with him. This experience influenced her appreciation of chess as "almost like an art form" and helped her understand the mathematical elegance of brilliant moves.

The novel's title is a play on terminology from both music and chess, where "intermezzo" refers to an interlude in music and an unexpected move in chess. Rooney wrote the book after moving from Dublin to the countryside near Castlebar, where she grew up. The novel is set between Dublin and a fictional town in the rural west of Ireland.

While Rooney had written male characters before, notably Connell in Normal People, Intermezzo was her first book about relationships between men. She said that she had "never witnessed a conversation between two men in which a woman wasn't present".

Rooney has said the novel is not autobiographical: although it draws on settings familiar from her life, such as Dublin and western Ireland, she does not consciously draw on personal emotional experiences when writing her characters. She has also said that Intermezzo partly emerged from her reading of James Joyce's Ulysses and her sense that it "demanded a response".

== Themes ==
A central theme in Intermezzo is grief and its effect on family relationships. The novel explores how the death of a father affects two brothers differently, examining the ways grief can divide and unite family members. This exploration of loss is intertwined with questions about memory, the absence of loved ones, and how grief can catalyse personal change.

The novel examines generational differences and age gaps, particularly through its portrayal of cross-generational relationships. It explores how age differences affect both romantic and familial relationships while also addressing broader questions about ageing, mortality, and the cultural divisions between millennials and Generation Z. These themes are closely tied to the novel's exploration of social judgement and cultural expectations.

Power dynamics and love are interconnected themes. The novel examines how relationships are shaped by social conventions, market forces, and systems of power. This extends to questions of gender roles and economic influences on romantic relationships, while also addressing the gap between ideological beliefs and personal behaviour. Power dynamics are explored chiefly through the relationship between the brothers, and particularly through the ways family bonds both constrain and enable personal growth.

== Style ==
Intermezzo differs stylistically from Rooney's previous work. Her earlier novels, particularly Beautiful World, Where Are You, are characterised by clean, dialogue-driven narratives with detached omniscient narration, but Intermezzo uses varied narrative techniques and distinct voices for its three main characters: Peter's sections feature staccato, fragmented sentences reminiscent of Joyce's Leopold Bloom; Ivan's narration has a cooler, more humorous tone; and Margaret's passages are slower and more deliberately paced. In The Telegraph, Cal Revely-Calder wrote that Peter's stream-of-consciousness passages are a stylistic experiment for Rooney, their shortened sentences and reduced number of verbs producing a choppier but rhythmically consistent flow that recalls Eimear McBride and Samuel Beckett.

The novel retains Rooney's practice of omitting quotation marks and approximating modernist techniques. In The Washington Post, Lillian Fishman found it less restrained than Rooney's earlier books, with more room for emotional and poetic expression. Revely-Calder wrote that Rooney's style, often mischaracterised as blank or flat, keeps its televisual qualities in Intermezzo, with smooth sentences, snappy dialogue and chapters that end like complete episodes.

== Publication ==
Faber & Faber published Intermezzo on 24 September 2024, partnering with more than 40 bookshops in what it called its "biggest trade campaign ever". In the United States, 140 bookshops hosted release parties for the novel, which Time compared to the promotion given to young adult blockbuster series.

Intermezzo became the fastest-selling book in Ireland in 2024, selling 11,885 copies in its first five days, and several Irish bookshops opened early to meet anticipated demand. It sold 44,233 copies in the United Kingdom over the same period.

== Reception ==
Intermezzo received largely favourable reviews.

In The Guardian, Alexandra Harris called Intermezzo "an accomplished continuation of the writing that made Rooney a global phenomenon" and described it as "more philosophically ambitious, stylistically varied, disturbing at times and altogether stranger". In Slate, Laura Miller wrote that while it was "sadder and less of a page-turner than her three previous novels", it represented "deeper territory for Rooney". In The Independent, the author Jo Hamya called it Rooney's artistic breakthrough, saying it "reflects a depth and purity of thought attained after three novels' worth of introspection", and rated it 5 stars.

Fishman wrote that "mourning, it turns out, is a natural subject for Rooney". In The Atlantic, Amy Weiss-Meyer called the characters "newly alert to the weight of years" and "as attuned to regret as to anticipation". In The New York Times, Dwight Garner wrote, "Rooney's writing about love hits as hard as it does because she is especially adept at evoking loneliness, for which love is a salve."

In The Telegraph, Revely-Calder wrote, "Peter, whose chapters supposedly parallel Ivan's but soon accrue greater force, is Rooney's finest portrait of a tortured man since Connell Waldron." In The Sunday Times, Johanna Thomas-Corr agreed: "The explosive arguments between Peter and Ivan, in which one knee-jerk judgment breaks the fall of another, are among the most masterly scenes she has written." In The Wall Street Journal, B. D. McClay wrote that the brothers are "aware that they play some sort of mysterious central role in another person's life and development, whether they want to or not."

Other reviewers were more critical. In The Times, James Marriott wrote, "the novel's insistence on a mood of ethical and intellectual refinement can feel claustrophobic and precious." In Jacobin, Marianela D'Aprile criticised the novel's gender dynamics, writing, "all the women need from the men is love—or rather, all the women need is love from men." Harris took issue with the portrayal of Sylvia: "we find little counter to the notion that Sylvia is a broken sex provider who cannot offer him fulfillment."

In Vulture, Andrea Long Chu analysed how the novel suggests that "love is real precisely because it is a product, one created by social conventions, by market forces, by systems of violence." In The Spectator, Claire Lowdon called the book "simple, heart-warming moral tales full of sex", adding that it "left me feeling I might have a stab at being a better person". In New Statesman, Lola Seaton wrote that while "Intermezzo lacks the taut self-assurance of Conversations with Friends and Normal People", it represents "an honourable, tenacious and not unsuccessful attempt to go beyond them."

Literary Hub's December 2024 round-up of year-end lists found that the book appeared on 20 different "Best Books of 2024" lists. In 2025 it received the Sky Arts Award for literature.
