= The Deuce (TV series) =

American drama television series

- Genre: Period drama
- Created by: George Pelecanos; David Simon
- Starring: James Franco; Maggie Gyllenhaal; Gbenga Akinnagbe; Chris Bauer; Gary Carr; Chris Coy; Dominique Fishback; Lawrence Gilliard Jr.; Margarita Levieva; Emily Meade; Natalie Paul; Michael Rispoli; Luke Kirby; Jamie Neumann; David Krumholtz; Olivia Luccardi; Sepideh Moafi; Daniel Sauli
- Opening theme: "(Don't Worry) If There's a Hell Below, We're All Going to Go" by Curtis Mayfield (season 1); "This Year's Girl" by Elvis Costello and Natalie Bergman (season 2); "Dreaming" by Blondie (season 3)
- Ending theme: "Assume the Position" by Lafayette Gilchrist
- Country of origin: United States
- Original language: English
- No. of seasons: 3
- No. of episodes: 25 (list of episodes)

Production
- Executive producers: David Simon; Richard Price; James Franco; Michelle MacLaren; George Pelecanos; Nina Kostroff Noble
- Producers: Jessica Levin; Maggie Gyllenhaal; Mark Henry Johnson; Laura Schweigman
- Production location: New York City
- Cinematography: Pepe Avila del Pino; Vanja Cernjul; Yaron Orbach
- Editor: Alex Hall
- Running time: 58–84 minutes
- Production companies: Blown Deadline Productions; Rabbit Bandini Productions; Spartan Productions

Original release
- Network: HBO
- Release: September 10, 2017 – October 28, 2019

The Deuce is an American drama television series created by David Simon and George Pelecanos, set in New York City during the 1970s and 1980s. It was broadcast by HBO in the United States and premiered on September 10, 2017. HBO made the pilot available through its streaming services and affiliates on August 25, 2017.

The Deuce features a large ensemble cast including James Franco playing twins and Maggie Gyllenhaal as an ambitious former sex worker who works to become an adult filmmaker. It tells the story of the Golden Age of Porn, the legalization and rise of the porn industry in New York City that began in the 1970s. Themes explored include navigating a culture of extreme misogyny, government and police corruption, the violence of the drug epidemic, and the real-estate booms and busts that coincided with the change. The show's title is derived from the nickname for 42nd Street between Seventh Avenue and Eighth Avenue.

On September 19, 2017, HBO renewed the series for a second season, which premiered on September 9, 2018. On September 20, 2018, HBO renewed the series for a third and final season, which premiered on September 9, 2019. The series concluded on October 28, 2019, after three seasons and 25 episodes.

== Premise ==
Set during the 1970s and 1980s in New York City, the drug epidemic and its violence is getting worse. Twin brothers Vincent and Frankie Martino become fronts for the Mafia while operating out of Times Square, which is also the home of Eileen "Candy" Merrell, a street-level prostitute who exits the dangers of the street by entering the emerging legal porn industry as an actress and director. The first season takes place from 1971 to 1972, while the second season jumps five years ahead to 1977 with the season concluding in the summer of 1978. The third season takes place from 1984 to 1985.

== Conception ==
The Deuce was envisioned as a three-season series by creators David Simon and George Pelecanos, with each season taking place in a different time during the rise of the porn industry in New York City during the 1970s and 1980s.

Marc Henry Johnson, an assistant locations manager on Treme, introduced Simon and Pelecanos to a man in New York City who told them vivid accounts from his stint as a mob front for bars and massage parlors in 1970s Manhattan. "The characters were so rich, and that's what it all comes down to", said Pelecanos. Inspired by these stories, the producers set out to present a fictional account of the era. "Some of it happened", said Simon. "Some of it didn't happen. Some of it might have happened. But all of it could have happened."

After suggestions from cast member Emily Meade, the series brought on Alicia Rodis as an intimacy coordinator, to help the actors during sex scenes, making sure they all felt safe and nobody was distressed. Meade explained, "It's just mind boggling to me I've never been on set with an intimacy coordinator before; it felt so natural and so necessary. It's crazy it took to 2018 for sexuality to be treated with the same sensitivity and vulnerability as violence, or animals or children. I hope it gets to a point where it's not a choice, it's necessity, just like stunt coordinators, or a chaperone for children and animals."

== Cast and characters ==
=== Main ===
- James Franco as Vincent Martino, a bartender, and Frankie Martino, a gambler. Twin Italian-American brothers from Brooklyn operating out of Times Square, they become associates of and fronts for the Mafia.
- Maggie Gyllenhaal as Eileen Merrell / Candy Renee, a prostitute with an entrepreneurial spirit who sees opportunity in the emerging pornography industry (loosely based on adult film actress and director Candida Royalle).
- Gbenga Akinnagbe as Larry Brown, an intense and demanding pimp who later discovers a talent for acting (seasons 1–2).
- Chris Bauer as Bobby Dwyer, Vincent and Frankie Martino's brother-in-law, a construction foreman and family man who begins working on The Deuce in one of the Mafia's parlors.
- Gary Carr as C.C., a charismatic but ruthless and controlling pimp (seasons 1–2; guest season 3).
- Chris Coy as Paul Hendrickson, a kindred spirit to Vincent Martino and a veteran bartender who pursues his own personal and professional ambitions in the emerging LGBT political community.
- Dominique Fishback as Donna Pickett / Darlene, a young, sweet-natured sex worker who relies on her savvy and intellect to create a life for herself while navigating a complicated relationship with Larry Brown (seasons 1–2; guest season 3).
- Lawrence Gilliard Jr. as Chris Alston, a smart NYPD patrolman who discovers corruption in the police department.
- Margarita Levieva as Abigail "Abby" Parker, a college student who rejects the confines of her wealthy upbringing by embracing feminist politics and entering a relationship with Vincent.
- Emily Meade as Sarah / Lori Madison, a young woman who quickly becomes a sex worker after arriving in New York City from Minnesota and finds her place in the emerging porn industry, but is hampered by the controlling C.C. and a cocaine addiction. The character is loosely based on the adult film star Shauna Grant.
- Natalie Paul as Sandra Washington, a newspaper reporter who's investigating the relationship between sex work in Times Square and the police department (season 1).
- Michael Rispoli as Rudy Pipilo, a Gambino family capo who oversees the Mafia's financial interests in the sex industry, generally preferring negotiation to violence.
- Luke Kirby as Gene Goldman, an incoming Koch administration official bent on reform (seasons 2–3).
- Jamie Neumann as Dorothy Spina / Ashley, a sex worker who works for C.C., who quits the sex trade and becomes an activist with the help of Abby (season 2; recurring season 1; guest season 3).
- David Krumholtz as Harvey Wasserman, a highly intelligent and quick-witted director of pornographic movies who mentors Eileen (season 3; recurring seasons 1–2).
- Olivia Luccardi as Margaret Rouse / Melissa, a sex worker who worked for Reggie Love and then for C.C. before joining the porn industry (season 3; recurring seasons 1–2).
- Sepideh Moafi as Loretta, a sex worker who works for Larry Brown (season 3; recurring seasons 1–2).
- Daniel Sauli as Tommy Longo, a gangster and an associate of and later (after being “made”) a soldier for Mafia capo Rudy Pipilo (season 3; recurring seasons 1–2).

=== Recurring ===
- Method Man as Rodney, a pimp (seasons 1–2).
- Don Harvey as Danny Flanagan, a NYPD patrolman and Alston's partner (seasons 1–2).
- Michael Kostroff as Rizzi, a desk sergeant in Alston and Flanagan's precinct (seasons 1–2).
- Mustafa Shakir as Mike "Big Mike", a physically imposing man of few words who becomes Vincent's muscle and fiercely devoted friend.
- Thaddeus Street as Frankie "Black Frankie", a Vietnam veteran hired by Vincent for security at the parlors.
- Genevieve Hudson-Price as Jocelyn Wasserman, Harvey's wife and film assistant.
- Anwan Glover as Leon, who runs a diner the characters frequent. His disgust at the treatment of the women by their pimps eventually boils over.
- Ralph Macchio as Officer Haddix, a jaded vice cop patrolling Times Square in the corrupt police force of 1970s New York.
- Zoe Kazan as Andrea Martino, Vincent's estranged wife.
- James Ciccone as Carmine Patriccia, a mob underboss who works out of a Mulberry Street social club in Little Italy and is one rung above Rudy Pipilo.
- Will Chase as Jack, a divorced man in his 40s who has a brief relationship with Eileen, unaware she is a sex worker (season 1).
- Garry Pastore as Matthew Ianniello, the Genovese Family capo who ran the Times Square porn industry during the 1970s and 1980s.
- Carolyn Mignini as Joan Merrell, Eileen's disappointed mother who lives in the suburbs of Queens.
- Finn Robbins (season 1), Mikey Moughan (season 2), and Dion Costelloe (season 3) as Adam, Eileen's son who lives with her mother.
- E.J. Carroll as "Fat" Mooney, manager of a sex shop owned by Frankie (seasons 1, 3).
- Gino Vento as Carlos, driver and bodyguard for mobster Rudy Pipilo (seasons 1–2).
- Aaron Dean Eisenberg as Todd Lang, a classically trained, unsuccessful actor who begins working in porn films and quickly finds a home. He befriends Paul Hendrickson and enters a personal/business relationship with him.
- Kim Director as Leila Brodie / Shay, a sex worker who works for Rodney and struggles with heroin addiction.
- Andrea-Rachel Parker as Bernice, a sensitive and naive young woman. During season 1 Darlene travels home to North Carolina and returns with Bernice. She is "traded" from Larry to Rodney, after Larry deems her too young and not street-ready. She then works at the parlor. In season 2, she becomes the parlor's bartender.
- Pernell Walker as Ruby / Thunder Thighs, a thoughtful and opinionated plus-sized African American sex worker (seasons 1, 3).
- Tariq Trotter as Reggie Love, a pimp (season 1).
- Matthew James Ballinger as Richie "Gentle Richie", a pimp (season 1).
- Kat Cunning as Christina Fuego, Frankie's wife (seasons 2–3).
- Alysia Reiner as Kiki Rains, a shrewd and successful talent agent who manages Lori (seasons 2–3).
- Roberta Colindrez as Irene, who manages a peep show owned by Vincent and the Mob. She helps Shay get sober and initiates a relationship with her (seasons 2–3).
- Armand Assante as Mr. Martino, Vincent and Frankie's father (seasons 2–3).
- Michael Stahl-David as Kenneth, a boyfriend of Paul's and business partner in his new club (season 2).
- Sebastian Arcelus as Dave, a labor activist and associate of Dorothy's (season 2).
- Esteban Carmona as Julito, a pimp (season 2).
- Jim Parrack as Russell, a film editor who becomes Eileen's boyfriend (season 2).
- Taylor Selé as Renton Lowry, a pleasant young man with a Caribbean accent who befriends Darlene and helps her get a job and escape the sex trade (season 2).
- Ryan Farrell as Greg Taylor, a Los Angeles talent agent who becomes Lori's personal and professional partner (seasons 2–3).
- Michael Gandolfini as Joey Dwyer, Bobby's son (seasons 2–3).
- Domenick Lombardozzi as Jack Maple, a highly regarded transit police officer who assists Alston in cleaning up Times Square (season 3).
- Kelcy Griffin as Jennifer Preston, a smart young African American cop who attracts the attention of Alston (season 3).
- Corey Stoll as Hank Jaffe, a wealthy businessman who dates Eileen (season 3).
- Calvin Leon Smith as Reg, a sweet-natured gay African American man who befriends Melissa and looks out for her in the apartment they share (season 3).
- Sonia Mena as Xiomara, an assertive Hispanic sex worker who quits Bobby's parlor business and encourages the other women to do the same (season 3).
- David Morse as Matthew Rouse, Melissa's long estranged father (season 3).
- Paloma Guzman as Pilar, a graffiti artist who initiates a relationship with Abby (season 3).
- Ben Livingston as Dr. Steiner, a psychiatrist who owns a sleazy property in Times Square (season 3).

=== Guest appearances ===
Clarke Peters, who played Lester Freamon in The Wire (which David Simon created), guest stars in the season 1 finale as "Ace", a former pimp and C.C.'s mentor. Photographer Nan Goldin made a cameo appearance in a season 2 episode. She has worked in the same post-Stonewall era of New York city displayed in the series. Co-creator and executive producer George Pelecanos appears as a bar patron in season 3, episode 6.

== Episodes ==
Season	Episodes	Originally released	
Season	Episodes	First released	Last released
1	8	September 10, 2017	October 29, 2017
2	9	September 9, 2018	November 4, 2018
3	8	September 9, 2019	October 28, 2019

== Reception ==
=== Critical response ===
Season	Critical response	
Season	Rotten Tomatoes	Metacritic
1	93% (202 reviews)	85 (35 reviews)
2	99% (104 reviews)	86 (13 reviews)
3	88% (17 reviews)	79 (6 reviews)

The Deuce has received critical acclaim. On Metacritic, the first season has a score of 85 out of 100 based on 35 reviews. On Rotten Tomatoes, it has a 93% approval rating with an average rating of 8.65 out of 10 based on 202 reviews. The site's critical consensus is, "The Deuce again demonstrates David Simon's masterful grasp of urban grit, while never losing detailed sight of its colorful characters." Daniel Fienberg of The Hollywood Reporter gave it a highly positive review, praising its ensemble cast, and wrote in conclusion, "Simon and Pelecanos are just beginning to put the machinery of The Deuce into motion in these eight episodes. As an opening act, the show's first season is substantive, provocative and entertaining." Charles Bramesco of The Guardian gave it a five star review and wrote, "Simon has created his most accessible work of humanism to date, and he's done so without sacrificing his loftier ambitions of societal critique."

The second season received continued critical acclaim. On Metacritic, it has a score of 86 out of 100 based on 13 reviews. On Rotten Tomatoes, it has a 99% approval rating with an average rating of 8.4 out of 10 based on 104 reviews. The site's critical consensus is, "The Deuce's excellent character-driven drama returns with even more immersive world-building and a welcome focus on its leading ladies, carried by a tour de force performance from Maggie Gyllenhaal." Allison Shoemaker for RogerEbert.com gave it a highly positive review, and wrote "Simon and Pelecanos seem to have hit their stride with this particular story, expertly balancing character-driven storytelling with a wide-angle view of the social, economic, political, cultural, sexual, and gendered dynamics of the era."

The third season received continued critical acclaim. On Metacritic, it has a score of 79 out of 100 based on 6 reviews. On Rotten Tomatoes, it has an 88% approval rating with an average rating of 8.8 out of 10 based on 17 reviews. The site's critical consensus is, "Visually rich and utterly human, what narrative stream The Deuce loses in its final season is more than made up for in its depth of character and world building." Ben Travers of IndieWire gave it an "A−" grade and praised the series' world-building, writing, "The Deuce is one of the most impressive examples in recent memory. He further wrote, "In terms of sheer artistic value, these touches can't be praised highly enough. [...] It's a stunning, transportive experience each and every episode."

=== Ratings ===
The premiere episode received 830,000 viewers on HBO for its initial airing and an additional 342,000 viewers for its encore later that night, on September 10, 2017. The episode was previously made available online through on-demand and HBO Go on August 25 and received 1.1 million viewers. Cumulatively, through all platforms, the episode received 2.2 million viewers.

=== Accolades ===
Year	Award	Category	Recipients	Result	Ref.
2017	Golden Globe Awards	Best Actress – Television Series Drama	Maggie Gyllenhaal	Nominated	
2017	Location Managers Guild Awards	Outstanding Locations in Period Television	Chris George, Pat Weber Sones	Nominated	
2017	Satellite Awards	Best Actress in a Drama / Genre Series	Maggie Gyllenhaal	Nominated	
2017	Writers Guild of America Awards	Best New Series	Megan Abbott, Marc Henry Johnson, Lisa Lutz, George Pelecanos, Richard Price, Will Ralston, David Simon, Chris Yakaitis	Nominated	
2019	Visual Effects Society Awards	Outstanding Supporting Visual Effects in a Photoreal Episode	Jim Rider, Steven Weigle, John Bair, Aaron Raff (for "We're all Beasts")	Nominated	
2019	Visual Effects Society Awards	Outstanding Created Environment in an Episode, Commercial, or Real-Time Project	John Bair, Vance Miller, Jose Marin, Steve Sullivan (for "42nd St")	Nominated	
2020	Casting Society of America	Television Series – Drama	Alexa L. Fogel, Kathryn Zamora-Benson, Elizabeth Berra	Nominated	
