= Conversations with Friends (TV series) =

2022 Irish drama television series

- Based on: Conversations with Friends by Sally Rooney
- Written by: Alice Birch; Mark O'Halloran; Meadhbh McHugh; Susan Soon He Stanton
- Directed by: Lenny Abrahamson; Leanne Welham
- Starring: Alison Oliver; Sasha Lane; Joe Alwyn; Jemima Kirke
- Countries of origin: Ireland; United Kingdom; United States
- Original language: English
- No. of seasons: 1
- No. of episodes: 12

Production
- Executive producers: Ed Guiney; Andrew Lowe; Emma Norton; Sally Rooney; Lenny Abrahamson; Tommy Bulfin; Rose Garnett
- Producers: Catherine Magee; Jeanie Igoe
- Running time: 25–31 minutes
- Production company: Element Pictures

Original release
- Network: BBC Three (UK); Hulu (US); RTÉ One (Ireland)
- Release: 15 May 2022

Conversations with Friends is an Irish television drama television series based on the 2017 novel of the same name by the Irish author Sally Rooney. Developed by Element Pictures for BBC Three and Hulu in association with RTÉ, it is the second adaptation by this crew of a Rooney novel after Normal People in 2020. Conversations with Friends was first broadcast on 15 May 2022 and received generally positive reviews from critics.

== Cast ==
=== Main ===
- Alison Oliver as Frances Flynn
- Sasha Lane as Bobbi Connolly
- Joe Alwyn as Nick Conway
- Jemima Kirke as Melissa Baines

=== Supporting ===
- Alex Murphy as Philip, Frances and Bobbi's friend
- Caoimhe Coburn Gray as Aideen, Frances and Bobbi's friend
- Justine Mitchell as Paula Flynn, Frances' mother
- Tommy Tiernan as Dennis Flynn, Frances' alcoholic father
- Kerry Fox as Valerie Taylor-Gates, Melissa's agent
- Tadhg Murphy as Derek, a long time friend of Nick and Melissa
- Sallay Garnett as Evelyn, Melissa and Nick's friend
- Emmanuel Okoye as Andrew, Aideen's boyfriend

== Episodes ==
No.	Title	Directed by	Written by	Original release date	U.K. viewers (millions)
1	"Episode 1"	Lenny Abrahamson	Alice Birch	15 May 2022	N/A
While performing spoken word poetry at an open mic in Dublin, college students Frances and her best friend and ex-girlfriend Bobbi cross paths with Melissa, a writer in her late 30s. Melissa invites the pair to her house for dinner where they meet her husband Nick, an actor. Their lives become increasingly intertwined as Bobbi and Melissa strike up a friendship and Frances develops a crush on Nick.
2	"Episode 2"	Lenny Abrahamson	Mark O'Halloran	15 May 2022	N/A
Melissa invites the friends to her birthday party. Frances kisses Nick. Later Nick invites Frances to come over while Melissa is away. The next day, Frances visits her parents in the country.
3	"Episode 3"	Lenny Abrahamson	Mark O'Halloran	15 May 2022	N/A
Frances and Nick have sex for the first time. They get to know each other, and Nick confides in her that Melissa had cheated on him in the past. Melissa invites the girls to a holiday in Croatia.
4	"Episode 4"	Lenny Abrahamson	Meadhbh McHugh and Susan Soon He Stanton	15 May 2022	N/A
The girls arrive in Croatia. They eat, drink and explore the town and countryside. At night, Nick comes to Frances' room and the two sleep together again.
5	"Episode 5"	Lenny Abrahamson	Meadhbh McHugh and Susan Soon He Stanton	15 May 2022	N/A
Melissa is on-edge after a visit from her agent, Valerie. After a boozy dinner Nick comes to Frances' room but is interrupted by Bobbi. Tensions rise as Bobbi grows frustrated with Frances's reluctance to talk about Nick's attraction to her.
6	"Episode 6"	Leanne Welham	Meadhbh McHugh	15 May 2022	N/A
After the holiday, Frances goes to see her mother. She ends up in the hospital with severe abdominal pain after getting her period. After being discharged from the hospital she visits her father, confronted by his worsening alcoholism. She returns to Dublin and tries to make amends with Bobbi.
7	"Episode 7"	Leanne Welham	Meadhbh McHugh	15 May 2022	N/A
In need of a new roommate, Frances asks Bobbi to move in with her. Nick returns from Croatia and starts coming round to Frances' flat. He wants to tell Melissa about the affair.
8	"Episode 8"	Leanne Welham	Meadhbh McHugh	15 May 2022	N/A
At Melissa's book launch, Frances is overcome with jealousy after seeing Nick and Melissa together. She goes on a Tinder date but seems uninterested. Nick invites her over. She says she loves him then leaves. Meanwhile Bobbi begins to grow frustrated with Frances' jealousy.
9	"Episode 9"	Leanne Welham	Mark O'Halloran	15 May 2022	N/A
After learning that Melissa’s agent wants to see some of Frances' work, she writes a short story reflecting on her relationship with Bobbi. Frances collapses and is helped home by Bobbi. Nick comes to see her and tells her he loves her.
10	"Episode 10"	Leanne Welham	Alice Birch	15 May 2022	N/A
Melissa tells Frances she wants to work out a way for Nick to be with both of them. Valerie decides to publish Frances's short story. While out shopping, Frances gets a concerning voicemail from her father.
11	"Episode 11"	Lenny Abrahamson	Alice Birch	15 May 2022	N/A
Nick had a breakdown. Frances is diagnosed with endometriosis. Nick says he slept with Melissa. The friends go to Nick's birthday party but Frances leaves. Bobbi, angry after discovering the short story Frances wrote, decides to move out.
12	"Episode 12"	Lenny Abrahamson	Alice Birch	15 May 2022	N/A
Frances calls Melissa and realises the damage she has done to other people. She apologises to Bobbi and says she loves her. They get back together again. Nick (accidentally) calls her. He misses her. She says "come and get me".

== Production ==
=== Development ===
In February 2020, it was announced that Conversations with Friends would be made into a 12-episode miniseries, and that most of the creative team behind the adaptation of Rooney's second novel, Normal People, including Element Pictures, director Lenny Abrahamson, and co-writer Alice Birch, would be returning for this adaptation. Mark O'Halloran, Meadhbh McHugh, and Susan Soon He Stanton were added as writers, and Leanne Welham was added as a director.

=== Casting ===
The cast was announced in February 2021, with Joe Alwyn, Jemima Kirke, Sasha Lane, and Alison Oliver as the book's main quartet.

=== Filming ===
Principal photography began in April 2021, in Northern Ireland. Locations include Northern Ireland, the Republic of Ireland, and Hvar, Croatia. Cast and crew were on set in Bray, County Wicklow that July. The production included an intimacy coordinator, Ita O'Brien.

== Release ==
The series premiered/released on 15 May 2022, on BBC Three and Hulu. It premiered on RTÉ One on Wednesday May 18 with a feature-length episode. Endeavor Content will distribute the series internationally.

As of May 30, 2023, the series was removed from the Hulu streaming platform.

== Reception ==
On review aggregator website Rotten Tomatoes, the limited series holds a 61% approval rating based on 59 critic reviews, with an average rating of 6.7/10. The website's critics consensus reads, "'While the characters are unevenly compelling and the overlong plotting makes these Conversations often go in circles, this adaptation retains some of the observant wisdom that made Sally Rooney's novel shine." On Metacritic, the series has a score of 64 out of 100, based on 29 critics, indicating "generally favorable reviews".
