= Alison Oliver =

Irish actress (born 1997)

- Born: 3 June 1997 (age 29); Ballintemple, Cork, Ireland
- Education: The Lir Academy, Trinity College Dublin (BA)
- Occupation: Actress
- Years active: 2022–present

External image
- Alison Oliver IMDb photo

Alison Oliver (born 3 June 1997) is an Irish actress. She is best known for her roles in the BBC Three and Hulu miniseries Conversations with Friends (2022), the 2023 film Saltburn and the HBO series Task (2025). She was named a 2023 actor to watch by Variety.

== Early life and education ==
Oliver was born in Cork, the third largest city in Ireland, on 3 June 1997. She was initially raised in Ballintemple in Cork before moving with her family to Blackrock, also in Cork, when she was young. Her mother is a social worker and her father worked in the motor trade. She is the youngest of three daughters. She attended Scoil Mhuire, a private school in Cork, and took drama, singing and dancing lessons at The Performer's Academy and the Cork School of Dance. She applied to Trinity College Dublin's drama school The Lir Academy, but was invited to take a year-long foundation course in Acting and Theatre first. She auditioned again after completing the course, going on to graduate with a Bachelor of Arts in acting in 2020.

== Career ==
Oliver landed her debut television role playing the lead character of Frances Flynn in Conversations with Friends, a 2022 miniseries adaptation of Sally Rooney's 2017 debut novel of the same name developed by Element Pictures for BBC Three and Hulu. She received the news that she had been cast in Conversations with Friends the morning after graduating from drama school. In 2023, she starred in the BBC One drama miniseries Best Interests alongside Sharon Horgan and Michael Sheen. She made her London stage debut in Women, Beware the Devil at the Almeida Theatre in February 2023, and in April 2023 starred in Dancing at Lughnasa at the National Theatre. She appeared on Variety's '10 actors to watch' list in 2023.

In 2023, Oliver made her feature film debut in Saltburn, written and directed by Emerald Fennell, where she played Venetia Catton. The film premiered at the 50th Telluride Film Festival and went on to be nominated for two Golden Globes and five BAFTA Film Awards. In 2024, Oliver played a supporting role in Justin Kurzel's film The Order, which premiered at the 81st Venice International Film Festival. She appeared in the 2025 HBO miniseries Task alongside Mark Ruffalo. For this role, she won best supporting actress in a drama at the 22nd Irish Film & Television Awards. In 2026, she played Isabella Linton in Emerald Fennell's film of Wuthering Heights, an adaptation of the novel of the same name.

== Personal life ==
Oliver is a vegetarian. In 2022, she was in a relationship with Irish actor Éanna Hardwicke. As of 2025, she is dating English actor Josh O'Connor. Since 2022, Oliver has mostly resided in London.

In September 2025, Oliver signed an open pledge with Film Workers for Palestine pledging not to work with Israeli film institutions "that are implicated in genocide and apartheid against the Palestinian people."

== Acting credits ==
Key
| † | Denotes works that have not yet been released |

=== Film ===
| Year | Title | Role | Notes | Ref. |
|---|---|---|---|---|
| 2023 | Five and a Half Love Stories in a Vilnius Apartment | Avril | | |
| 2023 | Saltburn | Venetia Catton | | |
| 2024 | The Order | Debbie Mathews | | |
| 2025 | Christy | Chloe | | |
| 2026 | Wuthering Heights | Isabella Linton | | |
| TBA | To Make Ends Meat † | TBA | Post-production | |
| TBA | Dennis † | TBA | Post-production | |
| TBA | Bad Bridgets † | TBA | Pre-production | |

=== Television ===
| Year | Title | Role | Notes | Ref. |
|---|---|---|---|---|
| 2022 | Conversations with Friends | Frances Flynn | Main role | |
| 2023 | Best Interests | Katie | Main role | |
| 2025 | Task | Trooper Lizzie Stover | 6 episodes | |

=== Theatre ===
| Year | Title | Role | Director | Playwright | Theatre |
|---|---|---|---|---|---|
| 2023 | Women, Beware the Devil | Agnes | Rupert Goold | Lulu Raczka | Almeida Theatre, London |
| 2023 | Dancing at Lughnasa | Chris | Josie Rourke | Brian Friel | National Theatre, London |
| 2023 | Portia Coughlan | Portia Coughlan | Carrie Cracknell | Marina Carr | Almeida Theatre, London |
| 2024 | The Other Place | Issy | Alexander Zeldin | Alexander Zeldin | Lyttelton Theatre, London |

== Accolades ==
List of awards and nominations received by Oliver
| Year | Award | Category | Nominated work | Result | Ref. |
|---|---|---|---|---|---|
| 2023 | IFTA Film & Drama Awards | Best Actress in a Lead Role | Conversations with Friends | Nominated | |
| 2024 | IFTA Film & Drama Awards | Best Supporting Actress – Film | Saltburn | Won | |
| 2024 | IFTA Film & Drama Awards | Rising Star Award | — | Nominated | |
| 2026 | IFTA Film & Drama Awards | Best Supporting Actress – Drama | Task | Won | |
| 2026 | Astra Midseason Movie Awards | Best Supporting Actress | Wuthering Heights | Nominated | |
