= Beautiful World, Where Are You =

2021 novel by Sally Rooney

- First UK edition
- Author: Sally Rooney
- Language: English
- Publisher: Faber and Faber; Farrar, Straus and Giroux
- Publication date: 7 September 2021
- Preceded by: Normal People

Beautiful World, Where Are You is a novel by Irish author Sally Rooney. It was released on 7 September 2021. The book was a New York Times and IndieBound bestseller.

== Synopsis ==
The work tells the story of Alice Kelleher, an Irish novelist, and her best friend Eileen Lydon, an editor at a literary magazine. In alternating chapters are descriptions of their lives and emails they send each other. The two other important characters are Kelleher's new lover Felix Brady, who works at a warehouse, and Lydon's friend Simon Costigan, who works as a policy adviser. In The Guardian, Anthony Cummins describes the novel's structure as a "love quadrangle" between Alice and Felix, on the one hand; and Eileen and Simon, on the other.

Beautiful World's themes include romance, friendship, precarity, and social class. The title comes from a poem by Friedrich Schiller which Franz Schubert set to music in 1819. The novel includes substantial epistolary elements, such as emails between Kelleher and Lydon.

== Publication and release ==
Before Beautiful World's release in September 2021, advance copies circulated on the internet; one sold on eBay for over US$200. On the day it was released, Beautiful World was a bestseller on Amazon. In anticipation of its release, Rooney's American publisher Farrar, Straus and Giroux distributed branded merchandise, including bucket hats and tote bags, to influencers. The first edition of Beautiful World was illustrated by Manshen Lo, and designed by Jon Gray.

Beautiful World was published by Faber & Faber in the United Kingdom, by Farrar, Straus and Giroux in the United States, and by Knopf Canada in Canada. Rooney rejected an offer from Modan, an Israeli publisher, to sell Hebrew-language translation rights due to her support of the Boycott, Divestment and Sanctions movement, preferring to sell Hebrew rights in a way that complies with the BDS movement guidelines. Steimatzky and Tzomet Sfarim, two Israeli bookstore chains, stopped selling Rooney's work following her decision.

== Reception ==
Beautiful World, Where Are You was a New York Times and IndieBound bestseller.

It received positive reviews from Slate, the New York Times, The Times, The Irish Times, The Atlantic, NPR, Financial Times, the Harvard Review, the Washington Post, the New Yorker, USA Today, Vox, The New Zealand Herald, The Boston Globe, The Sydney Morning Herald, The Guardian, and InStyle. The book also received starred reviews from Booklist, Library Journal, Publishers Weekly, and Kirkus.

The book received mixed reviews from Columbia Journal, Air Mail, Brooklyn Mail, The New Republic, the Los Angeles Times, The Wall Street Journal, Star Tribune, Entertainment Weekly, The Economist, New Statesman, The Observer, The Independent, The Nation, Vulture, and The i. Open Letters Review and the London Review of Books reviewed it negatively.

Author Brandon Taylor described Beautiful World as Rooney's "best novel yet" in a review for The New York Times, while expressing some concern that the novel lacks substantive political or moral critique. Reviewing the novel in Jacobin, Amelia Ayrelan Iuvino agreed that Beautiful World does not offer clear solutions to the social problems of late capitalism that it addresses, but argues that it is not the responsibility of fiction to provide such solutions. In a four-star review for Vox, Constance Grady argued that Beautiful World investigates questions with which Rooney's fiction has been consistently preoccupied: "As the world collapses all around us, is it morally defensible to devote your life to love, relationships, and the aesthetic pleasure of books? What if you get rich from it?"

== Literary awards ==
Year	Award	Category	Result	Ref.
2021	Goodreads Choice Awards	Fiction	Won	
2021	Irish Book Awards	Novel	Won	
2021	Kirkus Reviews Best Books	—	Selection	
2022	Australian Book Industry Awards	International Book	Shortlisted	
2022	British Book Awards	Fiction	Shortlisted	
2022	Dalkey Literary Awards	Novel	Won	
2022	Europese Literatuurprijs	—	Longlisted	
2022	Rathbones Folio Prize	—	Longlisted	
