= List of The Deuce episodes =

The Deuce is an American period drama television series created by David Simon and George Pelecanos, set in New York in the 1970s (seasons 1 and 2) and in the 1980s (season 3). With an ensemble cast featuring James Franco, Maggie Gyllenhaal, Gbenga Akinnagbe, Chris Bauer, Lawrence Gilliard Jr. and Emily Meade, the series tells the story of the Golden Age of Porn.

During the course of the series, 25 episodes of The Deuce aired over three seasons.

== Series overview ==
Season	Episodes	Originally released	
Season	Episodes	First released	Last released
1	8	September 10, 2017	October 29, 2017
2	9	September 9, 2018	November 4, 2018
3	8	September 9, 2019	October 28, 2019

== Episodes ==
=== Season 1 (2017) ===
No. overall	No. in season	Title	Directed by	Written by	Original release date	U.S. viewers (millions)
1	1	"Pilot"	Michelle MacLaren	George Pelecanos & David Simon	August 25, 2017 (online); September 10, 2017 (HBO)	0.830
In 1971, Brooklyn bartender Vince is working seven days a week to provide for his family. Vince's identical twin brother, reckless gambler Frankie, owes money to several mobsters and bookies. Fed up with his unfaithful wife, Andrea, Vince leaves his family and decides to focus on his job. Pimp C.C. tries to seduce innocent-looking Lori, a new arrival from Minnesota, but she knows his game and joins him willingly. C.C. has already ensnared Ashley, who is in love with him and becomes jealous of Lori. Another pimp, Larry Brown, is abusive towards the women who work for him, one of whom is the sweet-natured Darlene. Eileen, whose street name is "Candy", is a street walker and single mother, who chooses to work without a pimp. Candy is introduced to the ascendant pornographic film industry. College student Abby is arrested for buying drugs. At the police station, she meets Officer Chris Alston, who is versed on the players in the streets. The arresting officer, Flanagan, lets her go without charge and takes her to Vince's bar, but Abby is attracted to Vince instead. The next morning, Abby arrives for an exam, but walks away without entering the classroom. At his hotel, Vince witnesses C.C. intimidating and wounding Ashley with a knife after she begs not to work in the rain.
2	2	"Show and Prove"	Ernest Dickerson	Richard Price & George Pelecanos	September 17, 2017	0.839
Vince begins to work with mob capo Rudy Pipilo. Vince, Frankie, and their brother-in-law Bobby, a Brooklyn construction foreman, come up with a money-making scheme at Bobby's construction site involving the workers’ paychecks. Since the workers receive their paychecks on Fridays, they have to wait until Mondays to cash them at the bank, or they can receive cash on Friday for a fee. Because Vince was able to draw customers to a struggling Korean bar, Rudy gives him the chance to rebuild another struggling bar and make it his own. Abby drops out of school and moves into the city, taking a telemarketing job. C.C. continues to educate Lori about the New York streets and the "advantages" of having a pimp, but she hopes to use him as much as he uses her. Later, C.C. stabs and kills a man who is impersonating a police officer to kidnap Lori. Sandra Washington, a reporter, tries to talk to Darlene at a bar, but Larry intervenes. Candy fills in for Loretta at a porno shoot and is interested in filmmaking.
3	3	"The Principle Is All"	James Franco	David Simon & Richard Price	September 24, 2017	0.992
Candy goes to lunch with porn director Harvey Wasserman, where she pitches herself for a job in the filmmaking business. Bobby has a heart attack on his construction site and ends up in the hospital. Rudy and his associate Tommy Longo meet with their lawyer to purchase real estate in Hell's Kitchen, Manhattan. The NYC patrolmen, including Alston and Flanagan, are told about certain "no-go areas" for arrests. Darlene, after spending extra time with one of her regulars (an elderly man who just watches old movies with her), works overtime to compensate Larry. C.C. tells Lori to "play the long game” by gaining regular customers. Sandra interviews another sex worker, but has to pay her. Abby quits her telemarketing job and goes to work at Vince's bar, the Hi-Hat, which is having its opening night. During a successful opening night at the bar, a drifter named Big Mike stops an angry man from pulling a gun; Vince then hires him for security at the bar.
4	4	"I See Money"	Alex Hall	Story by : George Pelecanos and Lisa Lutz; Teleplay by : Lisa Lutz	October 1, 2017	0.941
Paul, a gay bartender who works with Vince, goes out for dinner with his closeted boyfriend. Sandra, while interviewing sex workers on the street, accidentally gets rounded up with them by the police. At the station, Alston recognizes she isn't one of them, and she introduces herself as a journalist. Sandra and Alston later go out together; while Alston thinks it's more of a date, Sandra is scouting for her report. Alston later tests the "no-go zone" by arresting a man for drug possession, and is told to let the offender go by his bosses. Andrea tells Vince that she and the kids miss him and that she wants to get back together with him. Abby, a budding feminist, is disgusted by the pimps and bonds with Darlene and Ashley. Later, Abby buys Darlene a bus ticket back home, wanting her to get out of the sex trade. A fight breaks out in the bar, and Vince hires a gunman, an ex-Vietnam vet named "Black" Frankie. When a worker at Bobby’s site raises questions about the check-cashing scheme, Rudy and Tommy have him beaten up as an example to the other workers. Vince and Abby begin a relationship and have sex in the bar after work. Rudy and Tommy take Vince to an empty building, which will be his next business. Eileen ("Candy") goes on an awkward date with a man named Jack, whom she met at a record store, finishing with an unexpectedly passionate kiss. She has several unpleasant experiences on the job, especially the sudden death of an overweight client while performing oral sex on him. She is later teased by the pimps at the diner where they and the sex workers hang out.
5	5	"What Kind of Bad?"	Uta Briesewitz	Story by : Richard Price; Teleplay by : Will Ralston & Chris Yakaitis	October 8, 2017	0.888
After spending time back home in North Carolina, Darlene returns to New York City with Bernice, a young woman from her hometown. Larry believes Bernice is too young, and he "trades" her to Rodney, another pimp. Abby hangs out with her old friends from college, but soon realizes it's not her scene anymore, and she returns to the Hi-Hat. Eileen sleeps with Jack, who still has no idea she is a sex worker; both the sex and the conversation are awkward, and she does not return his subsequent calls. Vince mulls over Rudy's offer regarding the empty building, which will become a brothel. Bobby convinces Vince to let him take care of it, so Vince can continue focusing on the bar. Rudy has an agreement with the police regarding the whorehouse, because they want that activity off the streets as much as possible. Paul, after exiting a gay porn theater, is arrested by cops for "soliciting” and is later bailed out by Big Mike, who was sent by Vince. Alston and Sandra continue working together, and he sets up an interview with pimp Reggie Love for Sandra. Candy is brutally beaten and robbed by one of her johns. She hides her wounds with makeup and goes back on the street, but when Rodney offers his services as a pimp, she still declines. Fed up with her job, Candy goes to Harvey, and he tells her they'll start in two weeks.
6	6	"Why Me?"	Roxann Dawson	Story by : Richard Price and Marc Henry Johnson; Teleplay by : Marc Henry Johnson	October 15, 2017	0.812
With the New Year approaching, the NYC patrolmen are told to crack down on illegal activity in their precinct and to arrest every sex worker and pimp on the streets. Vince's brothel, run by Bobby, opens. Vince comes to an agreement with several pimps, including Larry, Rodney, and Reggie, to use their girls in his brothel. It will get the girls off the street; they will be safe, and the pimps will still get their money. Since obscenity laws are loosening, Harvey returns to making porno films, with Eileen/Candy co-starring. When one of the girls can't make the shoot, Eileen gets Lori to fill in for her. C.C. shows up and demands more money for Lori to appear in the film, angering Harvey. Alston tells Sandra he doesn't want to be just her source, and they later go on a date. Rudy enlists the help of Frankie and Big Mike to confirm if some of his men are skimming. Big Mike sketches a design for a partitioned version of a peep show. Eileen learns from Harvey that the next film shoot won't be for another month, but Eileen needs to make money and doesn't want to go back on the streets. Feeling bad, Harvey visits Eileen at her apartment and sets her up with a female pimp (madam), where the clientele is vetted and more wealthy.
7	7	"Au Reservoir"	James Franco	Story by : David Simon and Megan Abbott; Teleplay by : Megan Abbott	October 22, 2017	0.953
It is now 1972. Alston reveals to Sandra the NYPD's plan of running the sex workers off the streets and into the parlors, and also reveals that the police are getting paid by the parlors for their protection. Ashley is sick of being treated poorly by C.C. and ditches work. Later, she meets Frankie at the Hi-Hat, and they are invited by Paul to a movie screening that stars Paul's friend Todd. Unbeknownst to Frankie, it's a gay porn film called Boys in the Sand. Ashley and Frankie spend the night together at a hotel, where he reveals he is homeless. Later, Ashley hides out at Abby's apartment. As they become friends, she reveals that her real name is Dorothy. Bobby deals with several issues at the parlor regarding the girls: Shay collapses from a drug overdose, Melissa and Barbara are caught robbing a customer, and Bernice suffers a mental breakdown. Darlene tells Bernice it was a mistake to bring her to New York and advises her to return to North Carolina. Bobby shows favoritism to Tiffany, whom he pays, so she doesn't have to see customers. The pimps, C.C., Larry, and Rodney, begin to feel superfluous since the girls are working in the parlors. At a diner frequented by streetwalkers, Leon watches Reggie beating Melissa and suddenly shoots Reggie dead, calmly calling the police afterward. Eileen discovers that a richer clientele does not necessarily mean she will be treated any better on the job. She works with Harvey on his next porn film and showcases her talents as an artist behind the scenes, inspiring better performances from Lori and the other actors. Abby takes Vince to Connecticut to meet her family at a big party, and her father appears unfazed. Abby gives Dorothy a check her father gave her and takes her to the Port Authority, from where she departs to visit her sister in upstate New York.
8	8	"My Name Is Ruby"	Michelle MacLaren	David Simon & George Pelecanos	October 29, 2017	0.771
Rudy shows Vince, Frankie, and Bobby a three-story building that will be their next parlor. Vince is appalled by his involvement in this type of business and says he's out. Abby and Paul bring live music to the Hi-Hat. Vince suggests to Abby that they should move in together, but maintain an open relationship. Vince beats up a man who has been physically abusing his ex-wife, Andrea. C.C. talks with an old mentor of his, Ace, a former pimp, and sees what his future could be. One of Larry's girls, Barbara, is arrested by undercover cops while trying to buy drugs on Larry's behalf. Sandra is informed by her editor that they will not run her story about police corruption without a named source. The precinct's new captain promises Alston he will clean house, but Alston has to keep silent and, in exchange, is offered a detective position. Alston breaks the news to Sandra, and she storms off. Sandra's story is published as a human-interest story rather than revealing the city's corruption. Eileen visits her gay brother in the hospital, who was sent there by their father to receive electroshock therapy. When Harvey can't show up for work, Eileen takes over as director. Later, Eileen and Harvey go to the red carpet premiere of Deep Throat. Abby tells Vince that Paul wants to open his own gay bar in the Village. Ruby gets into an argument with one of her johns after he tries taking back his money. He pushes her out the window, killing her.

=== Season 2 (2018) ===
No. overall	No. in season	Title	Directed by	Written by	Original release date	U.S. viewers (millions)
9	1	"Our Raison d'Etre"	Alex Hall	David Simon & George Pelecanos	September 9, 2018	0.636
It is now 1977, and Vincent is the owner of a successful mob-backed disco called Club 366. Abby is now the manager of the Hi-Hat, which she runs as a rock music venue. Bobby continues to run the massage parlor, where Bernice, unable to cope with the emotional demands of sex work, is now employed as a bartender. Frankie is running Showland, a peep show establishment featuring real women instead of videos. He takes $10,000 from the safe and disappears, angering Vincent, who tries to track him down. Frankie returns and reveals to Vincent that he is married and used the money to buy a ring. Vincent eventually forgives Frankie and forgoes his debt, calling it a wedding present. Candy and Harvey clash over her editing techniques on their latest adult film, which he believes to be "too artistic.” Lori is a successful porn star, but is still in the clutches of C.C., who hustles the director to get more money and demands high prices from potential clients. Darlene obtains her GED, unbeknownst to Larry. Paul is managing a gay bar, but wants to open his own establishment without the mob's involvement. Alston is now a homicide detective and is dating a nurse. Alston is approached at a crime scene by Gene Goldman, an aide for Ed Koch, who is leading the Midtown Enforcement Project.
10	2	"There's an Art to This"	Alex Hall	Richard Price	September 16, 2018	0.605
Candy is frustrated with the type of porn films they're making and wants to make ones with better stories. Harvey introduces her to Genevieve Furie, a former porn director who gives her advice. Candy has breakfast with her son and discusses buying a larger apartment for them. Lori and Harvey receive nominations from the Adult Film Association of America. Lori meets with Kiki Rains, who wants to manage her; Kiki warns Lori that C.C. will drag her down. Vince and Abby go on a trip to Coney Island. After a gay man is assaulted outside Paul's bar, a rival mobster offers his protection to Paul, who has been paying Rudy Pipilo for protection. Paul continues to search for a location for his new club. Alston solves his homicide case: a young male sex worker stabbed a tourist, but Alston coaches him to say it was in self-defense. Larry asks Candy if he could perform in one of her films, but she believes he won't be able to give up control. Bobby continues his affair with Tiffany, one of the women from the massage parlor, and has a child with her. Abby goes to a meeting held by former sex worker Ashley (whose real name is Dorothy), who is now an activist helping other women.
11	3	"Seven-Fifty"	Steph Green	Chris Yakaitis	September 23, 2018	0.585
Lori goes to the AFAA Awards in Los Angeles by herself after C.C. reveals he's afraid to fly. Harvey and Candy go as well. At the awards ceremony, Lori and Harvey both win their respective awards, best supporting actress and best director. Lori makes several connections in Los Angeles, including a talent scout who encourages her to stay there. Upon returning to New York, Lori tells C.C. she's done working the streets. C.C. smashes her trophy, telling her not to forget who she is. While in Los Angeles, Candy meets with a producer to whom she pitches her idea for a Little Red Riding Hood porn film. He loses interest when she reveals she's the director and won't be performing in it. However, he offers her $10,000, with 10% of profits, but only if she performs oral sex on him, which she eventually does. After Frankie steals again, Rudy no longer wants him working for him. Frankie wins at poker, which nets him a laundry business. Paul gets a loan from Vincent for his new bar—without Rudy Pipilo's involvement. More massage parlors are opening up, causing friction among the mob bosses. Rudy has one of his rivals’ parlors set on fire. Leon returns to the diner after having served a five-year prison sentence for having killed Reggie. Larry and Darlene quit a porn shoot due to racism. Koch administration aide Gene Goldman presents the administration’s plan to clean up Times Square at Alston's precinct. Abby meets with Dorothy and others from her activist group. Dorothy runs into C.C. at the Hi-Hat and is uncomfortable.
12	4	"What Big Ideas"	Uta Briesewitz	Anya Epstein	September 30, 2018	0.562
Candy shows Harvey her ideas for her Little Red Riding Hood film, but Harvey thinks the ideas are too ambitious. After having difficulty writing the script, Candy hires a writer. Shay overdoses again at the peep show and is entered into rehab. Frankie's first day running his new dry-cleaning business is overwhelming. At Lori's porn shoot, C.C. makes suggestions to the director, including a film about the life of a pimp. Lori meets with Kiki again. Kiki wants to manage her, but Lori is too scared to leave C.C. Larry stars in his first porn film, directed by Candy, but has trouble with the dialogue. Darlene reveals he's illiterate, so Candy has him and the girl in the scene improvise their dialogue, which leads to a great performance from Larry. In retaliation for a prior massage-parlor fire instigated by a rival mob boss, one of Rudy's parlors is burned down, resulting in the death of a 16-year-old sex worker named Kitty. Abby blames Bobby for Kitty's death because he's responsible for running all of Rudy's parlors. Vincent wants out of the parlor business completely. Vincent and Black Frankie witness Tommy Longo kill a rival gang member in the street. Dorothy finds out Kitty's real identity, Stephanie Esposito, and tracks down her family, but her father is uninterested in identifying her body or providing a burial service. Goldman wants the parlors to be raided, but Alston tells him the parlors are warned in advance by police officers taking bribes from the mob. Abby and Vincent pay for Stephanie's funeral, which they attend, along with Dorothy and Bobby.
13	5	"All You'll Be Eating is Cannibals"	Zetna Fuentes	Richard Price & Carl Capotorto	October 7, 2018	0.494
C.C. hits Lori after he finds out that Kiki wants to manage her, believing Lori went behind his back. C.C. later tries to make it up to her by buying her a puppy. Larry watches Blue Collar in a movie theater and gets more interested in acting than pimping. Shay is released from rehab, and Irene takes her in as she's worried that she will fall back into her heroin addiction. Irene makes advances on her, which she accepts, although she has had no previous relationship with a woman. Candy, with Kiki's help, begins casting for her film. Disappointed with the script by the hired writer, Candy asks Jocelyn to rewrite it. Paul is over budget at his nightclub, leading to a fight with his boyfriend. Instead of going home, Paul goes to an underground sex club and engages in anonymous sex. Low on cash, Candy asks Vincent if he wants to invest in her film; he suggests she ask Frankie, who recently sold his dry-cleaning business. Frankie invests $10,000 in her film and becomes a co-producer. Abby and Vincent host a clinic in their bar to help Dorothy. Big Mike and Black Frankie rob a poker game, stealing $40,000, which impresses Tommy Longo. Lori goes to Candy's apartment to audition for the lead role in her film. After Candy remarks about her black eye, Lori explains how bad her situation with C.C. is. Dorothy has another run-in with C.C., confronting him and sarcastically thanking him for turning her into the strong woman she is. Alston informs Gene Goldman that they will be raiding the parlors again, but for real this time. Bobby's parlor is raided, and he ends up on the TV news, causing problems for his family. Abby wants Bobby banned from the Hi-Hat, and she questions Vincent's involvement with the mob. Candy begins shooting her film, Red Hot.
14	6	"We're All Beasts"	Susanna White	Megan Abbott & Stephani DeLuca	October 14, 2018	0.554
Candy continues filming her movie guerrilla-style on the streets of New York. Lori is playing Red, and the high-maintenance male actor quits due to working conditions. Candy hires Larry in his place, and he impresses with his improvised dialogue and performance. Harvey is stressed when Candy spends too much money on a location, and Frankie's wife Tina, playing the grandmother whom he hired himself, causes delays by forgetting the dialogue in her scene. Frankie fires his wife, sparking a fight between them. Candy tells Frankie they need another $20,000 to finish the film. Larry pays Darlene to help him read lines. To get money, Frankie, along with Big Mike and Black Frankie, robs a shoe truck, but it has only the left shoes on board, a tactic used in common robberies. Frankie brings Rudy to the Deuce to watch Candy film a scene; impressed, Rudy offers $20,000 with a 25% profit share. Frankie shows up to set with the money, exciting Candy and the others, but they don't know it's from the mob. Gene Goldman goes to a gay man's bathhouse before going home to his wife. Bobby pays his fines, and after his son is arrested for fighting, he puts him to work at the massage parlor. Abby and Dorothy negotiate with the pimps and tenants. Vincent comes clean to Abby about his involvement with the mob and that his establishments are mob-backed. He tells her he's not taking any more money from the parlors and gives her his last payout, telling her to do something good with it. Paul's upscale club opens with Vincent and Abby in attendance. Abby gives the money to Dorothy to help a sex worker escape the streets and leave the city.
15	7	"The Feminism Part"	Tricia Brock	Will Ralston	October 21, 2018	0.446
Vincent tells Rudy he wants out of the parlors and peep shows, but Tommy Longo makes it clear to Vincent that he can't quit. To clear his head, Vincent drives to Vermont and ends up helping a short-staffed bartender. Bobby's son Joey gets involved with a girl at the parlor, but Bobby quickly breaks it up. Darlene learns she's pregnant and gets an abortion. Candy and Harvey screen the movie to their mobster investors, but when it comes to business, they are more interested in talking with Harvey alone. They agree to put Candy front and center in the marketing, but Candy worries her son will find out. She shows her son where she works, but leaves the porn part out of it. Irene discovers Shay has left the apartment and learns that she is back on the streets working for Rodney. Paul and his boyfriend Kenneth have an amicable breakup after realizing they've drifted apart. Flanagan has an argument with his mistress, Anita, one of the girls from Bobby's parlor, and he ends up killing her in a fit of rage. Abby and Dave, an activist friend of Dorothy’s, have sex. Anita's body is pulled from the river, and Alston is called on the case. He recognizes her and the wristwatch she clutches, which was a gift Flanagan's wife gave him. Alston tries to get Flanagan to turn himself in, but he commits suicide instead. Vincent talks with Abby about his time in Vermont, and says he would like to move there, but she reminds him she's from Connecticut and doesn't want that kind of life. Because of their open relationship, Abby tells Vincent she had sex with Dave. Vincent gets a new Cadillac from Rudy and Tommy as a gift. As they drive to dinner together, they are shot at by people in a following vehicle. They realize Vincent was the target.
16	8	"Nobody Has to Get Hurt"	Tanya Hamilton	George Pelecanos	October 28, 2018	0.480
Rudy and Tommy bring Vincent to interrogate Marty Hodas to find out who shot at them, but he doesn't know anything. Paul falls back into a relationship with Todd. Rudy partners with Matty "the Horse" Ianniello on signing Lori to a movie deal. The two later meet with Kiki to complete the deal. After she reminds them that C.C. will be a problem, the three of them agree to a buyout. Darlene begins to look for legitimate work with the assistance of Renton, a friend and fellow student whose sister owns a used-clothing shop. Goldman has another sexual encounter with a man, but rejects calling himself gay. C.C. takes Lori out for their last night; afterward, he rapes her and throws a few bills at her as a final humiliation. Frankie begins an affair with an older married woman. The next day, Lori goes to Los Angeles with Kiki. The others warn Dorothy that she is crossing a line with her tactics and putting them in danger; Dave tells her he can't work with her anymore and leaves. Various pimps, including C.C. and Rodney, discuss the problems Dorothy is causing them, but C.C. warns them that, as she is a civilian, harming her will ultimately have negative repercussions for them. Shay gets high on hydromorphone with Rodney, and they plan on robbing a pharmacy. Barbara is out of prison and goes to the diner, where she confronts Larry about his not having visited her in prison. Vincent visits his parents and talks to his father about his relationship with Abby; Vincent says he wants a more traditional life with a family, but Abby doesn't. His father reminds him that he had a family with his ex-wife. C.C. goes to Bobby's parlor and demands a $10,000 advance from Frankie for Lori. Bobby gets furious over C.C.'s disrespectful attitude, and when C.C. mentions Bobby's wife, Bobby stabs him with a screwdriver. C.C. then attacks Bobby; Frankie, defending him, bludgeons C.C. to death with a hammer.
17	9	"Inside the Pretend"	Minkie Spiro	David Simon	November 4, 2018	0.387
The premiere of Red Hot is held, and Lori, nervous about C.C. showing up, is also struggling with her cocaine addiction. Harvey reads Candy a glowing review of the film, but she is disappointed when she overhears her boyfriend talking with his friends, referring to her as a porn star; she later breaks up with him. Vincent visits his ex-wife, Andrea, and their children. They watch The Bridge on the River Kwai together and have a civil conversation about their subsequent relationships. Black Frankie is ordered to kill Carlos, who has become a problem due to alcohol issues. Paul gets back in with the mob after accepting funding to help his boyfriend, Todd, with his new business venture—a community theater. Alston arrives at the scene of a dead body, which turns out to be Dorothy. Darlene starts working at a clothing store and is recognized by a customer. Harvey shows Candy the future of their industry—the VCR, allowing viewers to watch porn in their own homes. Alston is promoted to sergeant. Abby is devastated after learning of Dorothy's death. Loretta accuses Larry of involvement in the murder, but he denies it. She moves out and asks Abby for a job at the bar. Darlene leaves Larry's and says goodbye. Rodney is killed by a drunk officer, Haddix, after a failed robbery of the pharmacy. Harvey learns that parts of the film were also sold to Rudy, so now two different mob families own it, and it's unlikely the cast and crew will see any revenue from it. Candy goes to visit her son, but her father bans her from seeing him. Lori is still nervous about C.C., so Frankie reveals to her that he is dead. After he leaves, she bursts into tears, but this morphs into laughter. Candy begins work on her next porn film. Vincent leaves another envelope of money for Abby at the bar. Darlene reveals her past to her classmate Renton, but he accepts her for who she is; they later go on a date. Frankie goes back to working at the peep show and reverts to stealing from the safe, but lets Irene in on it. Goldman unveils the Midtown Enforcement Project. Larry auditions for a legitimate acting gig.

=== Season 3 (2019) ===
No. overall	No. in season	Title	Directed by	Written by	Original release date	U.S. viewers (millions)
18	1	"The Camera Loves You"	Alex Hall	David Simon & George Pelecanos	September 9, 2019	0.339
It's 1984, and Lori is living in Los Angeles. She completes a month in rehab, but is soon doing cocaine again. Vince and Abby are still together, but have drifted apart emotionally. Vince spends a night watching TV with his children and ex-wife Andrea. Loretta works at Abby's bar and has become an anti-pornography activist. Bobby worries that he may have caught AIDS from his many sexual encounters with prostitutes. The AIDS epidemic has also undermined Paul's business. Eileen wants to continue making artistic porn and appeal to a female audience, but Harvey tells her there is no money in this and he is not prepared to invest in it. He notes the success of cheap, poorly made direct-to-video films. Frankie and Irene are making cheap amateur porn videos with a home video recorder. Frankie also deals in drugs in partnership with some Greek criminals. Eileen visits her mother, Joan, who is very ill. Eileen's son, Adam, has left home and is no longer in contact with the family. On New Year's Eve, Eileen visits Vince's club and meets a wealthy businessman named Hank. Bobby has a random sexual encounter in the bar's bathroom.
19	2	"Morta di Fame"	Susanna White	Carl Capotorto	September 16, 2019	0.282
Frankie starts distributing amateur pornography and enlists the help of local porn kingpin Robert DiBernardo. Rudy, under pressure from John Gotti, urges Vincent and Paul to return more profit. Rudy is angry that Frankie has cut him out of his sideline business and reveals to Frankie that DiBernardo is also distributing child pornography, which is on view in his booths. Candy has ideas for a new movie, which she tries to discuss with Harvey. He is not interested; he invites her to fill in as director on a porn shoot to make some cash. On a mission to clean up Times Square, Alston attempts to trace the building owners, who are typically shielded by shell companies. Now a well-known performer in adult films, Lori refuses to do a particularly degrading scene for a major porn producer and storms off the set. Her manager, Kiki, warns her that her porn career will not last forever and urges her to go back and complete the scene or risk losing work. A fight breaks out in Vince's club over a cocaine buy, leading to a police raid, from which Vince can no longer rely on Haddix for protection. Eileen and Hank go on a date, where she tells him about her profession. He doesn't mind and invites her to a dinner party with friends, where he unashamedly tells them she makes erotic films. Melissa befriends her gay neighbor, Reg. Shay, whose real name is revealed to be Lila Brody, stumbles into Abby's bar in a terrible state and is taken to Saint Vincent's Hospital by Abby and Loretta. Abby, who has donated to the hospital for many years, manages to secure urgent treatment for Shay, but she still succumbs to her illness.
20	3	"Normal Is a Lie"	Tanya Hamilton	Iturri Sosa	September 23, 2019	0.299
Lori stars in a music video and is taught the rudiments of guitar, sparking an interest in music. During a porn shoot, she insists that the performer wear a condom for an anal scene. Melissa's father, Matthew, arrives from Michigan and asks the police for help in finding her, but Haddix tells him he must pay him to search on his own time. Vince and Big Mike check out a club that has recently come on the market; Vince offers to let Mike manage it. Alston identifies Steiner, a psychiatrist, as the owner of a seedy hotel, and, posing as a patient, threatens him with bad publicity if he refuses to sell. Alston follows through on his threat, but he still won't sell. Bobby's son, Joey, starts work as a clerk for a Wall Street brokering firm, but is popular with the brokers mainly for his ability to acquire drugs and prostitutes. Todd is seriously ill with AIDS and struggles to remember his lines; he quits the soap opera in which he has been cast. Eileen visits her dying mother, who encourages her to reconcile with her father; her father reveals that Adam, who is now 20, called them asking for money. He has drug issues, and, in trying to justify herself to Hank, Eileen realizes that she is largely responsible for his problems. Hank offers to finance Eileen's next film project, but she firmly refuses. Abby meets a street artist named Pilar, and they are immediately attracted to each other. Pilar shows her some of her work, and they kiss. Haddix traces Melissa through his underworld contacts and gives Matthew her address. Matthew, who was an abusive alcoholic, hasn't seen her since she was 14; it is implied that his abusive behavior drove her mother to suicide. He begs for forgiveness.
21	4	"They Can Never Go Home"	James Franco	Will Ralston	September 30, 2019	0.300
Vince, Frankie, Mike, and Reg help Melissa pack to live with her father. Reg is happy for Melissa, but the others express skepticism about her leaving. Scouting for actors, Eileen and Hank see various obscure theater productions. Abby's relationship with Pilar develops as she drifts apart from Vince. Lori flies to New York, but fails her audition for a B-grade horror movie. She stumbles into Mike on Times Square, and is invited to visit Vince's club. Vince makes a move on her, which she goes along with, but is offended when he produces a condom. Alston, who is now sleeping with Jennifer, begins a crackdown on prostitution in Steiner's apartment block. He and Haddix later stage an arson attack. Abby invites Eileen to make a presentation to a WAP meeting. There, she meets Andrea Dworkin, who convincingly argues that the vast majority of women in the sex industry are unable to escape abuse and exploitation, and that Eileen's films are part of the problem. Eileen, afterward, refers to the women as assholes, but is clearly affected by the experience. Black Frankie helps a client who starts choking, and when he attempts a tracheotomy he is attacked by hotel security and later charged with attempted murder. Lori returns to Los Angeles and meets her guitar teacher for an open mic night. She sings well, but gets little reaction from the audience, and tearfully tells Kiki that she's only good for porn movies. Vince and Frankie celebrate their birthday at the club. Frankie is shot outside the club by a disgruntled associate; he manages to stumble back into the club but dies in Vince's arms.
22	5	"You Only Get One"	Roxann Dawson	Chris Yakaitis	October 7, 2019	0.237
Vince is distraught over Frankie's murder. He tarnishes his relationship with Rudy, believing he had something to do with it. Making inquiries from Frankie's Greek associates, he identifies his brother's murderer as Pasquale, a low-level mobster whose father is a made member of the Gambino crime family. Abby and Tommy separately urge him not to seek revenge, but he ignores them. Identifying Pasquale’s car, Vince runs him off the road, kidnaps him, and shoots him dead. Paul notifies Todd's parents of Todd's imminent demise. His parents come to New York and remove him from the hospital so he can die at home. Todd has dementia and does not appear to recognize his parents. Paul gets along well with Todd's mother, Phyllis, but his father, Jonathan, is still unable to accept his son's appearances in gay porn films. After Todd dies, Paul calls his own father. Bobby persuades the client who choked to drop the charges against Black Frankie, leading to his release from Rikers. Eileen meets with her son, Adam, who asks for $1,000 to start a T-shirt business. When she presses him for details of his business plan, the conversation degenerates into a nasty argument. Lori begins dancing at strip clubs in Indiana, but is unnerved by several of her fans who want a more personal relationship with her. One stalks her to the motel, but it turns out to be a hallucination, because when she calls the hotel manager, there is nobody; she buys a gun. Darlene returns to the Hi-Hat and asks Abby for help to become a nurse; because she has a criminal record, Abby lobbies for her at an appeals board meeting. Harvey criticizes Eileen's latest script and refuses to fund any more of her films, causing a rift between them. They later reconcile.
23	6	"This Trust Thing"	James Franco	Stephani DeLuca	October 14, 2019	0.260
Observing the crass behavior of male customers at a diner toward a waitress inspires Eileen to change the theme of her film. She attends her mother's funeral with Hank and Harvey, but Adam doesn't show up, and her father refuses to speak to her. When Adam calls later, she hangs up on him. Vince meets with Rudy, who denies any knowledge of Pasquale's hit on Frankie and any knowledge of Tommy's involvement in the drug trade, of which he disapproves. Rudy tries to negotiate with his boss, Carmine. He stands by Vince, saying he gave him permission to take revenge on Pasquale. He later confronts Tommy about his involvement in the drug trade and possibly Frankie's murder. Melissa returns to New York and moves in with Reg, who is now ill with AIDS; she was happy to meet her brother and his family, but couldn't live with her father, whom Reg calls a dry drunk. Bobby's business is in trouble after Xiomara and several other women quit over their meager share of the takings. Abby is furious when she discovers Vince's gun, but he somehow persuades her to stay with him. Harvey agrees to finance 50% of Eileen's next film. During a reading for her film with an actress, she describes the character's background; the character’s father, Catholic and a hypocrite, forced her to undergo a backstreet abortion. Greg's business ventures fail due to changing conditions in the video porn market. Lori reluctantly completes a gang-bang shoot, then fires her manager, Kiki. She comes home to find Greg having sex with another woman, and promptly leaves him. Paul suspects he has AIDS, though he has not been tested. He signs his assets over to Abby on his death, instructing her to sell all his business interests. He is arrested during a protest on behalf of AIDS people with AIDS. Big Mike discovers he has AIDS and quietly quits his job, to Vince's consternation. Tommy pretends to make up with Rudy, then kills him.
24	7	"That's a Wrap"	Alex Hall	George Pelecanos & David Simon	October 21, 2019	0.280
Vincent rebuffs Tommy and visits Mike at a secluded cabin he secured for him to live out his life. Lori, alone and short on cash, calls Eileen for help; coincidentally, Eileen is looking for a big name to attach to her film to secure further funding. Reg gets Melissa a job on the set of a movie. Abby delivers a heartfelt but venomous rebuke to Goldman's warnings to the local community about cooperating with the prostitution industry. Pilar grows weary with Abby's distant behavior and, after Abby arrives late for an important art show, Pilar ends their relationship. Bobby, urged by Black Frankie, tries to get Tommy to accept that the recent shift in the prostitution business cannot be stopped or solved by making an example of Xiomara. Joey offers Bobby an opportunity to invest in shorting the stock of a new drug, claiming to have obtained inside information that it will not be approved due to its side effects. Eileen and Harvey negotiate with Greg and Lori's representatives to allow Lori to work on their film, along with an additional $15,000 for Eileen, agreeing to make a one-off porn film appearance. Vincent eventually sees Tommy, who denies killing Rudy, but tells Vincent that Rudy was killed for accepting responsibility for his murder of Pasquale. Tommy ignores a jaded Vincent's reticence to return to the nightclub trade, and tells him he'll be put in a new place that he'll like. Vincent returns to his apartment to find out that Abby has moved out, leaving the revolver she found on the table over a photograph she took of him. After visiting Eileen, Lori returns to The Deuce and attracts a john. When the john leaves the hotel, Lori neatly places the cash on the dresser and considers taking a bump of cocaine. Instead, she removes a revolver from her purse and shoots herself in the head. The following day, when Lori fails to show up on set, Eileen senses that something is very wrong and suspends filming for the day.
25	8	"Finish It"	Roxann Dawson	George Pelecanos & David Simon	October 28, 2019	0.294
Eileen's actors reluctantly perform the sex scenes. Melissa and Reg get married in a low-key ceremony, allowing her to collect on his life insurance and take over the lease on his inevitable death. Vince finds Mike dead at the cabin. Bobby acquires some surly prostitutes from a Russian mobster, but is soon closed down by city officials. Hank tries to convince Eileen to abandon her appearance in Larry's porn movie after he is offered a senior position with Lehman Brothers. Eileen refuses, breaks up with him, and completes the shoot. Vince tells Abby he plans to quit the mob and offers her the Hi-Hat. Abby has other ideas, wanting to return to college, but instead she offers the business to Loretta. Loretta's boyfriend, Juan, suggests they move in together, but she refuses. Joey and some co-workers are charged with insider trading. Paul's bathhouse is shut down, but he keeps his bar. Alston takes Goldberg to The Bronx to show him that the prostitutes have not left New York, but merely moved to a different borough. Black Frankie leaves to stay with relatives in Baltimore. Eileen is frustrated with her film and is on the point of quitting until Harvey reviews her footage and tells her to finish it, without the sex scenes. Tommy agrees to let Vince buy out of his and Paul's arrangement with the mob for $200,000. In a coda set in 2019, an elderly Vince stays at a bland Times Square hotel while visiting New York for Joey's wedding. He reads of Eileen's death; her last film, A Pawn in Their Game, unsuccessful on release, is now considered a cult classic, and is part of The Criterion Collection. He has several imaginary encounters with dead acquaintances as he walks the gentrified Times Square, eventually descending into the subway with Frankie. Abby is seen in the crowd, apparently a successful lawyer.
