= Conversations with Friends =

2017 novel by Sally Rooney

- First edition cover
- Author: Sally Rooney
- Audio read by: Aoife McMahon
- Language: English
- Genre: love, romance
- Publisher: Faber & Faber
- Publication date: 25 May 2017
- Publication place: Ireland
- Media type: Print (Hardcover)
- Pages: 336
- ISBN: 978-0-571-33312-7
- OCLC: 1031891111
- Dewey Decimal: 823/.92
- LC Class: PR6118.O59 C66 2017

Conversations with Friends is the 2017 debut novel by the Irish author Sally Rooney, about two young women who become involved with an older couple in Dublin's literary scene. The novel was published by Faber and Faber and received critical acclaim. A television adaptation, also called Conversations with Friends, was released in 2022.

== Background ==
The book was completed whilst Rooney was still studying to write and complete her master's degree in American literature. The book was subject to a seven-party auction for the publishing rights. Rights were eventually sold in 12 countries.

The novel was published in June 2017 by Faber and Faber. It was nominated for the 2018 Dylan Thomas Prize and the 2018 Folio Prize.

== Plot ==
In Dublin, college students Frances (the narrator) and her best friend and ex-girlfriend Bobbi are noticed by Melissa, an essayist and photographer in her late thirties, when they are performing spoken-word poetry. Melissa invites them home, where they meet her husband, Nick, an actor. Their four lives become increasingly entangled as Frances begins an affair with Nick, and Bobbi and Melissa grow closer.

== Reception ==
Writing for The New Yorker, Alexandra Schwartz praises Rooney, noting that "she writes with a rare, thrilling confidence, in a lucid and exacting style uncluttered with the sort of steroidal imagery and strobe flashes of figurative language that so many dutifully literary novelists employ." Schwartz continues, "one wonderful aspect of Rooney's consistently wonderful novel is the fierce clarity with which she examines the self-delusion that so often festers alongside presumed self-knowledge." The Guardian similarly praised the author, noting how "Rooney writes so well of the condition of being a young, gifted but self-destructive woman, both the mentality and physicality of it. She is alert to the invisible bars imprisoning the apparently free." Reviewing for Slate, Katy Waldman described how "Sally Rooney is a planter of small surprises, sowing them like landmines. They relate to behavior and psychology—characters zigging when you expect them to zag, from passivity to sudden aggression and back." Waldman further applauds the novel, noting that "Rooney herself is acute and sensitive—she may have pinned these fragile creatures to a board, but her eye is not cruel. Bobbi, Frances, Nick, and Melissa excel at endearing banter and hesitant, vulnerable disclosure. They are all thrillingly sharp, hyperverbal."

== Awards ==
Year	Award	Category	Result	Ref
2017	Books Are My Bag Readers Award	Novel	Shortlisted	
2017	Irish Book Award	Newcomer	Shortlisted	
2017	Sunday Times Charlotte Aitken Young Writer of the Year Award	—	Won	
2018	British Book Industry Awards	Debut Book of the Year	Shortlisted	
2018	Desmond Elliott Prize	—	Longlisted	
2018	Dylan Thomas Prize	—	Shortlisted	
2018	Europese Literatuurprijs	—	Longlisted	
2018	Kerry Group Irish Fiction Award	—	Shortlisted	
2018	Polari Prize	Polari First Book Prize	Longlisted	
2018	The Writers' Prize	—	Shortlisted	
2019	International Dublin Literary Award	—	Shortlisted	
2021	Yasnaya Polyana Literary Award	Foreign Literature	—	

== Television adaptation ==
After the success of the streaming adaptation of Normal People (2020), based on Rooney's second novel of the same name, Hulu/BBC Three announced their intention to develop a television adaptation of Conversations with Friends. Director Lenny Abrahamson and writer Alice Birch were attached to the project, which was released in May of 2022. The cast includes Alison Oliver as Frances, Sasha Lane as Bobbi, Jemima Kirke as Melissa, and Joe Alwyn as Nick.
