= Normal People (TV series) =

2020 Irish drama television series

- Genre: Romance
- Created by: Catherine Magee
- Based on: Normal People by Sally Rooney
- Written by: Sally Rooney; Alice Birch; Mark O'Rowe
- Directed by: Lenny Abrahamson; Hettie Macdonald
- Starring: Daisy Edgar-Jones; Paul Mescal; Sarah Greene
- Composer: Stephen Rennicks
- Countries of origin: Ireland; United Kingdom; United States
- Original language: English
- No. of episodes: 12

Production
- Executive producers: Ed Guiney; Andrew Lowe; Emma Norton; Anna Ferguson; Sally Rooney; Lenny Abrahamson; Tommy Bulfin; Rose Garnett
- Producer: Catherine Magee
- Production locations: Ireland; Sweden; Italy
- Cinematography: Suzie Lavelle; Kate McCullough
- Editors: Nathan Nugent; Stephen O'Connell
- Running time: 23–34 minutes
- Production companies: Element Pictures; Screen Ireland

Original release
- Network: BBC Three
- Release: 26 April 2020
- Network: Hulu
- Release: 29 April 2020
- Network: RTÉ One
- Release: 28 April – 2 June 2020

Normal People is a romantic drama limited series based on the 2018 novel of the same name by Sally Rooney. It was written by Rooney, Alice Birch and Mark O'Rowe, and directed by Lenny Abrahamson and Hettie Macdonald. The series follows the relationship between Marianne Sheridan (Daisy Edgar-Jones) and Connell Waldron (Paul Mescal), who attend the same secondary school and the same university.

The series was greenlit in 2019, with Edgar-Jones and Mescal announced to star. The remaining cast was rounded out soon after Rooney was confirmed as one of the series' writers, alongside Birch and O'Rowe. Macdonald was then announced as a director with Abrahamson, continuing his long-standing relationship with the series' producers, Element Pictures. Principal photography began in May 2019 and concluded in February 2020, with filming locations including County Sligo, Dublin, Sant'Oreste, and Luleå.

Normal People first premiered in the United Kingdom on 26 April 2020, on BBC Three. Its episodes began airing weekly on RTÉ One in Ireland from 28 April until June 2, and it premiered in the United States on Hulu on 29 April. The series received positive reviews, primarily for its cast performances: Mescal was nominated for Outstanding Lead Actor at the 72nd Primetime Emmy Awards and won for Best Actor at the 67th British Academy Television Awards. The series has appeared on best television lists published by Vogue, BBC, Harper's Bazaar, The New York Times, among others.

== Premise ==
The series follows Marianne Sheridan, an affluent and isolated social outcast, and Connell Waldron, a popular, high-achieving student with anxiety, as they begin a secretive relationship during their final days of secondary school in County Sligo. Connell's mother, Lorraine, is employed by Marianne's mother, Denise, as a cleaner. Connell and Marianne's relationship becomes strained as their lives begin to change when they go on to attend Trinity College in Dublin.

== Cast ==
=== Main ===
- Daisy Edgar-Jones as Marianne Sheridan, an affluent, outspoken student who struggles with social acceptance. She begins a secret relationship in their last year of secondary school with Connell.
- Paul Mescal as Connell Waldron, a popular, high-achieving student and athlete who struggles with anxiety. He begins a secret relationship in their last year of secondary school with Marianne.
- Sarah Greene as Lorraine Waldron, (Note: Greene is only credited in episodes in which she appears.) Connell's single mother, who is employed as the Sheridans' cleaner. She shares a close relationship with Connell and Marianne.

=== Recurring ===
- Aislín McGuckin as Denise Sheridan, Marianne and Alan's single mother who suffered domestic abuse from their father. Denise fails to contain Alan's abuse towards Marianne.
- Éanna Hardwicke as Rob Hegarty, a close friend of Connell's from school.
- Frank Blake as Alan Sheridan, Marianne's abusive brother.
- Eliot Salt as Joanna, a close friend of Marianne's at college.
- India Mullen as Peggy, a wealthy member of Marianne's social circle at college.
- Desmond Eastwood as Niall, Connell's university flatmate who encourages Connell and Marianne's relationship.
- Sebastian de Souza as Gareth, Connell’s outspoken college classmate and Marianne's ex-boyfriend.
- Fionn O'Shea as Jamie, part of Marianne's social circle at Trinity College who goes on to date Marianne.
- Leah McNamara as Rachel Moran, part of Connell's social circle at school and his ex-girlfriend.
- Seán Doyle as Eric, one of Connell's school friends.
- Niamh Lynch as Karen, a friendly school acquaintance of Marianne's.
- Kwaku Fortune as Philip, a friend of Marianne's at college.
- Clinton Liberty as Kiernan.
- Aoife Hinds as Helen Brophy, Connell's girlfriend at college.
- Lancelot Ncube as Lukas, Marianne's abusive boyfriend in Sweden.
- Noma Dumezweni as Gillian, Connell's therapist.

== Episodes ==
No.	Title	Directed by	Written by	UK release date	US release date	Ireland air date
1	Episode 1	Lenny Abrahamson	Sally Rooney and Alice Birch	26 April 2020	29 April 2020	28 April 2020
In secondary school, popular athlete Connell and social outcast Marianne begin a relationship. Marianne confronts Connell about her feelings for him but he requests their relationship is kept a secret, fearing social rejection from his friends.
2	Episode 2	Lenny Abrahamson	Sally Rooney and Alice Birch	26 April 2020	29 April 2020	28 April 2020
Connell and Marianne's romance blossoms but Connell's request of secrecy puts their relationship under strain.
3	Episode 3	Lenny Abrahamson	Sally Rooney and Alice Birch	26 April 2020	29 April 2020	5 May 2020
Marianne is assaulted at a fundraiser for the debs, and goes home with Connell. However, she breaks up with him after he asks his ex-girlfriend, Rachel, to the debs. Lorraine argues with Connell after he refuses to publicly acknowledge Marianne. During the debs, Connell's friend Eric reveals all of his friends knew of his relationship with Marianne, and that they wouldn't have rejected him. Later that night, Connell breaks down crying.
4	Episode 4	Lenny Abrahamson	Sally Rooney and Alice Birch	26 April 2020	29 April 2020	5 May 2020
Months later, Connell reunites with Marianne at Trinity College through Gareth, a classmate of his whom she is dating. While Connell struggles to fit into the new environment, Marianne has made several friends, in contrast to her time in school. After meeting again at a party, Connell and Marianne decide to be friends.
5	Episode 5	Lenny Abrahamson	Sally Rooney and Alice Birch	26 April 2020	29 April 2020	12 May 2020
Marianne and Connell grow closer and they confront Connell's treatment of her in school. Marianne then breaks up with Gareth and attempt to restart her relationship with Connell. However, another member of their friend group, Jamie, has a crush on Marianne.
6	Episode 6	Lenny Abrahamson	Sally Rooney and Alice Birch	26 April 2020	29 April 2020	12 May 2020
Connell and Marianne's renewed relationship blossoms. During a return trip home, Marianne is physically assaulted by her brother. Connell is unable to pay rent for his accommodation in Dublin after being made redundant: unable to bring himself to ask Marianne to stay with her, he abruptly moves back to Sligo, causing them to break up.
7	Episode 7	Hettie Macdonald	Alice Birch	26 April 2020	29 April 2020	19 May 2020
Connell spends the summer partying with his school friends while Marianne begins a relationship with Jamie. She reveals to Connell that Jamie engages in sadomasochism in their relationship. In the following semester, Connell and Marianne are accepted into the Schols program. Connell arrives to Marianne's house later that night, injured after a mugging. Marianne and Connell realize their breakup was due to a misunderstanding over Connell's financial situation, but he leaves after he tells her of his new girlfriend, Helen.
8	Episode 8	Hettie Macdonald	Alice Birch	26 April 2020	29 April 2020	19 May 2020
After a summer backpacking in Europe, Connell and Niall visit Marianne's Italian vacation home, and meet Jamie and Peggy. During dinner, Jamie's controlling and abusive attitude leads to an argument with Marianne. She decides to stay with Connell but declines to have sex with him.
9	Episode 9	Hettie Macdonald	Alice Birch	26 April 2020	29 April 2020	26 May 2020
During her Erasmus exchange in Sweden, Marianne begins an intense sadomasochistic relationship with a student photographer, Lukas. Connell remains in regular contact with Marianne, which upsets Helen. Lukas initiates bondage with Marianne during a photography shoot, causing her to break up with him.
10	Episode 10	Hettie Macdonald	Alice Birch	26 April 2020	29 April 2020	26 May 2020
Connell's mental health suffers after Rob dies by suicide on New Year's Eve. While in Sligo for the funeral, he becomes more distant from Helen, causing her to break up with him. Connell begins seeing a counselor at university who helps him process his emotions, leading him to seek out to rekindle his relationship with Marianne.
11	Episode 11	Hettie Macdonald	Mark O'Rowe	26 April 2020	29 April 2020	2 June 2020
Marianne and Connell reconnect when they return to Sligo. Marianne asks Connell to hit her during sex, unsettling him and causing Marianne to abruptly leave in shame. Marianne's brother, Alan, who disapproves of her relationship with Connell, attacks her and breaks her nose. Connell threatens Alan and leaves with Marianne.
12	Episode 12	Hettie Macdonald	Alice Birch	26 April 2020	29 April 2020	2 June 2020
Marianne spends Christmas with Connell's family, finding comfort in a healthy family dynamic. Her mother refuses to speak to her. Connell is offered a place on a year-long MFA writing program in New York: Marianne pushes for him to attend, feeling content with her life and her relationship with Connell.

== Production ==
=== Development and casting ===
In May 2019, it was announced that BBC Three and Hulu would adapt Rooney's novel into a limited series which will premiere in 2020. Paul Mescal and Daisy Edgar-Jones were also announced to star as Connell and Marianne, respectively. The remainder of the cast, including Aislín McGuckin and Sarah Greene, was rounded out soon after. Rooney was hired to adapt her novel alongside Alice Birch and Mark O'Rowe. Lenny Abrahamson and Hettie Macdonald were then confirmed as directors, with the Irish company Element Pictures acting as the series' lead producers.

=== Filming ===
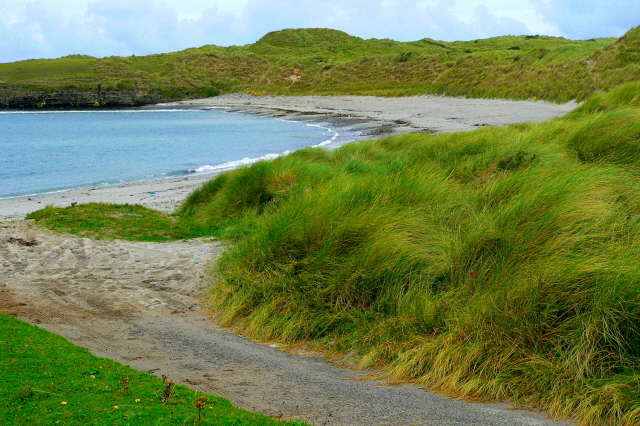
Scenes were filmed at Streedagh Point, along Wild Atlantic Way.

Principal photography began on location in County Sligo and Dublin in May 2019. Tubbercurry primarily made up the fictional town of Carricklea, with Streedagh Point along Wild Atlantic Way used for beach scenes, Knockmore House in Enniskerry for the Sheridans' residence, and a terraced home in Shankill for the Waldrons' residence.

Hartstown Community School in Clonsilla was used to depict the secondary school scenes, which featured real students as extras. Students from Trinity College Dublin were also used as extras during filming at the university. Scenes at Marianne's Dublin flat were shot on Wellington Road in Ballsbridge.

Although set in Trieste in the novel, filming took place in Central Italy, primarily in and around Sant'Oreste, Stimigliano, and the villa Il Casale on Tenuta di Verzano, in Lazio. Scenes set in Luleå were filmed in February 2020 to ensure adequate snowfall and for the Baltic Sea to be frozen over for a scene depicting Marianne walking.

=== Music ===
- Episode 1 ends with the song "Warped Windows" by Anna Mieke.
- Episode 2 opens with the song "Did It To Myself" by Orla Gartland and ends with the song "Angeles" by Elliott Smith.
- Episode 3 ends with the song "Only You" by Yazoo.
- Episode 4 ends with the song "Undertow" by Lisa Hannigan.
- Episode 5 ends with the song "Make You Feel My Love" covered by Ane Brun.
- Episode 6 opens with the song "Too Much" by Carly Rae Jepsen.
- Episode 7 ends with the song "Metrona" by The Sei.
- Episode 8 ends with the song "Love Will Tear Us Apart" covered by Nerina Pallot.
- Episode 9 opens with the song "Rare" by Selena Gomez and ends with the song "Scene Suspended" by Jon Hopkins.
- Episode 10 ends with the song "Everything I Am Is Yours" by Villagers.
- Episode 11 ends with the song "Strange Weather" by Anna Calvi featuring David Byrne.
- Episode 12 starts with the song "The Subterranean Heart" by Mount Alaska and ends with the song "Sometimes" by Goldmund.

The series also featured music from The Young Will Eat The Old, the debut album from Irish hip hop duo Tebi Rex.

== Release ==
The first look pictures came out on 1 November 2019. BBC Three and Hulu released their own teasers on 17 January 2020, followed by official trailers on 31 March.

The series' 12 episodes became available as a BBC Three box set on BBC iPlayer on 26 April, followed by a BBC One airing on 27 April. The series became available on Stan in Australia on 27 April and began airing on RTÉ One in Ireland on 28 April. The series premiered in the US on Hulu on 29 April. The series has been sold to over 20 broadcasters worldwide.

In June 2020, Abrahamson directed Edgar-Jones and Mescal in a one-off spoof short episode as part of RTÉ Does Comic Relief, in which Marianne and Connell give confessions to a priest played by Andrew Scott.

== Reception ==
=== Critical response ===
The series was widely praised. On Rotten Tomatoes, the series has a 91% rating, with an average score of 8.2/10 based on 91 reviews. The site's critical consensus reads, "Anchored by Daisy Edgar-Jones and Paul Mescal's vulnerable performances, Normal People is at once intimate and illuminating, beautifully translating the nuances of its source material." On Metacritic, the series has a score of 82 out of 100, based on reviews from 25 critics, indicating "universal acclaim". In 2026, it was ranked the 49th best TV series of the 21st century by The New York Times.

In a positive review for Variety, Caroline Framke wrote: "With its trifecta of elegant writing, directing, and acting, Normal People is just as bleak and uncompromising as Rooney's novel, making you both crave and dread knowing—or perhaps more accurately, experiencing—what happens." NPR's Linda Holmes praised the main cast's performances and their chemistry, writing, "[Mescal and Edgar-Jones] have the vulnerability it takes to maintain confidence. They've both figured out how to put a particular warmth in their eyes when they're able to find those connected moments, like a light that flips on. [Mescal] is a stunning talent for someone who is genuinely just starting out in television — it's a treat to see [the actors] work so well together".

In a negative review, Jessa Crispin of The Guardian called the series "a gutless soap opera for millennials" and wrote the series is a "dull, tedious reworking of a romance plot as old as time". Crispin also criticized its unrealistic depiction of university freshmen, casting of older actors to play teenagers, and lack of depth, writing, "[Normal People] analyzes itself with offhand comments so you don't have to do any thinking." In another negative review, Matt Fagerholm of RogerEbert.com compared Normal People to "being stuck on a bad date that refuses to end", criticizing its writing, Mescal's casting, and its "cowardly" and "unforgivable" characters, calling Marianne a "despairing addition to an array of submissive heroines routinely defined by the men in their lives" and concluded that the series is "a frustrating, fractured romance between an inarticulate weakling and a woman who deserves much better".

The nudity and sex scenes in the series drew controversy, while the work of Ita O'Brien as the show's intimacy coordinator was praised, some viewers called in to complain on Liveline, arguing the nudity was excessive or inappropriate. The series also received controversy by excluding the overt mentions of The Communist Manifesto and The Golden Notebook which Rooney, a self-identified Marxist, included in her original novel. Speaking on the series' popularity, Prathyush Parasuraman of Film Companion wrote: "Rarely have I seen the sort of cultural dialogue that I saw [from] the release of Normal People."

=== Viewing figures ===
Normal People gave BBC Three its best ever week on iPlayer (26 April to 3 May), receiving over 16.2 million programme requests across the 12 episodes, about 5 million of which were from 16- to 34-year-olds, and bringing BBC Three requests up to 21.8 million, doubling the previous record of 10.8 million from the release of the first series of Killing Eve. Seventy per cent of BBC Three requests that week were for Normal People and a quarter had finished all 12 episodes. It became the most-streamed series of the year on the BBC, with 62.7 million views from April to November 2020.

The first two episodes were reported to have been watched on RTÉ One by an average of 371,000 viewers with an additional 19,000 on RTÉ One +1 and 301,000 streams on RTÉ Player, becoming the most watched opening of a drama series on RTÉ Player. Thirty per cent of 15- to 34-year-olds watching TV were watching Normal People. The finale had over 319,000 viewers, 33% of the total RTÉ audience and 20% increase over the previous week. In June 2020, it was reported that Normal People had garnered over 3 million views on RTÉ Player, breaking the previous record for the streaming service of 1.2 million, which was held by the fourth series of Love/Hate.

=== Awards and nominations ===
Year	Award	Category	Nominee	Result	Ref.
2020	British Society of Cinematographers Awards	Best Cinematography in a Television Drama	Suzie Lavelle (for "Episode 1")	Won	
2020	Primetime Emmy Awards	Outstanding Lead Actor in a Limited Series or Movie	Paul Mescal	Nominated	
2020	Primetime Emmy Awards	Outstanding Directing for a Limited Series, Movie or Dramatic Special	Lenny Abrahamson (for "Episode 5")	Nominated	
2020	Primetime Emmy Awards	Outstanding Writing for a Limited Series, Movie or Dramatic Special	Sally Rooney and Alice Birch (for "Episode 3")	Nominated	
2020	Primetime Creative Arts Emmy Awards	Outstanding Casting for a Limited Series, Movie or Special	Louise Kiely	Nominated	
2020	Royal Television Society Programme Awards	Actor: Male	Paul Mescal	Nominated	
2020	Royal Television Society Programme Awards	Actor: Female	Daisy Edgar-Jones	Nominated	
2020	Royal Television Society Craft & Design Awards	Director – Drama	Lenny Abrahamson	Won	
2020	Royal Television Society Craft & Design Awards	Photography – Drama and Comedy	Suzie Lavelle	Won	
2020	Royal Television Society Craft & Design Awards	Editing	Nathan Nugent	Nominated	
2020	TCA Awards	Outstanding Achievement in Movies, Miniseries and Specials	Normal People	Nominated	
2021	AACTA Awards	Best Actor in a Series	Paul Mescal	Nominated	
2021	AACTA Awards	Best Actress in a Series	Daisy Edgar-Jones	Nominated	
2021	British Academy Television Awards	Best Mini-Series	Lenny Abrahamson, Sally Rooney, Ed Guiney, Andrew Lowe, Emma Norton and Catherine Magee	Nominated	
2021	British Academy Television Awards	Best Actor	Paul Mescal	Won	
2021	British Academy Television Awards	Best Actress	Daisy Edgar-Jones	Nominated	
2021	British Academy Television Craft Awards	Best Director: Fiction	Lenny Abrahamson	Nominated	
2021	British Academy Television Craft Awards	Best Editing: Fiction	Nathan Nugent	Nominated	
2021	British Academy Television Craft Awards	Best Photography & Lighting: Fiction	Suzie Lavelle	Nominated	
2021	British Academy Television Craft Awards	Best Sound: Fiction	Niall O'Sullivan, Steve Fanagan and Niall Brady	Nominated	
2021	BSC Awards	Best Cinematography in a Television Drama	Suzie Lavelle	Won	
2021	Casting Society of America	Limited Series	Louise Kiely	Won	
2021	Critics' Choice Television Awards	Best Limited Series	Normal People	Nominated	
2021	Critics' Choice Television Awards	Best Actor in a Movie/Miniseries	Paul Mescal	Nominated	
2021	Critics' Choice Television Awards	Best Actress in a Movie/Miniseries	Daisy Edgar-Jones	Nominated	
2021	Golden Globe Awards	Best Limited Series or Television Film	Normal People	Nominated	
2021	Golden Globe Awards	Best Actress – Limited Series or Television Film	Daisy Edgar-Jones	Nominated	
2021	MTV Movie & TV Awards	Best Breakthrough Performance	Paul Mescal	Nominated	
2021	Producers Guild of America Awards	David L. Wolper Award for Outstanding Producer of Limited Series Television	Lenny Abrahamson, Sally Rooney, Ed Guiney, Andrew Lowe, Emma Norton, Anna Ferguson and Catherine Magee	Nominated	
2021	Satellite Awards	Best Miniseries	Normal People	Nominated	
2021	Irish Film & Television Awards	Best Drama	Normal People	Won	
2021	Irish Film & Television Awards	Director – Drama	Lenny Abrahamson	Won	
2021	Irish Film & Television Awards	Script – Drama	Sally Rooney	Won	
2021	Irish Film & Television Awards	Lead Actor in a Drama	Paul Mescal	Won	
2021	Irish Film & Television Awards	Supporting Actor in a Drama	Desmond Eastwood	Nominated	
2021	Irish Film & Television Awards	Supporting Actor in a Drama	Fionn O'Shea	Won	
2021	Irish Film & Television Awards	Supporting Actress in a Drama	Sarah Greene	Won	
2021	Irish Film & Television Awards	Cinematography	Kate McCullough	Won	
2021	Irish Film & Television Awards	Cinematography	Suzie Lavelle	Nominated	
2021	Irish Film & Television Awards	Costume	Lorna Marie Mugan	Nominated	
2021	Irish Film & Television Awards	Editing	Nathan Nugent	Nominated	
2021	Irish Film & Television Awards	Production Design	Lucy van Lonkhuyzen	Won	
2021	Irish Film & Television Awards	Sound	Steve Fanagan, Niall Brady, and Niall O'Sullivan	Won	
2021	Irish Film & Television Awards	Makeup and Hair	Sandra Kelly and Sharon Doyle	Nominated	
2021	Irish Film & Television Awards	Score	Stephen Rennicks	Nominated	

== See also ==
- Conversations with Friends
