= Alicia Rodis =

American intimacy coordinator

Alicia Rodis is an American intimacy coordinator, director and actress.

== Career ==
Rodis grew up in Cleveland, Ohio, and acted in regional and classical theatre. Growing up, Alicia was often cast in more adult roles. At age 15 she had an on-stage kiss, and at age 18 faked an orgasm. She had mixed experiences of adult scenes, with some causing mental distress later.

She moved to New York City in 2008, and became involved with the New York Shakespeare Exchange, becoming the fight director for several productions, and directing a Shakespeare-themed pub crawl in the city. She also worked with the Yale School of Drama and the Juilliard School. She worked as intimacy coordinator on Season 2 of HBO's The Deuce and was the first such hire by a mainstream television network; demand for intimacy coordinators, who are tasked to ensure the well-being of actors performing in sex scenes or other intimate sequences, rose following the emergence of the Me Too movement in 2017. She was recommended for the role based on her reputation, and her help was described as "a successful, positive, experience".

== Intimacy Directors International ==
Rodis is a founding member of Intimacy Directors International, an organization working towards developing standards of safety and performance for intimacy in film and on stage. Along with her co-founders, Tonia Sina and Siobhan Richardson, she has witnessed inappropriate behavior on set or mishandling during scenes involving close intimacy. Her role is to watch the scenes closely, making notes, and making sure actors are comfortable with the work required, and that nobody is physically or mentally harmed. Rodis has said that there is an increased demand for this type of work. In early 2020, the Screen Actors Guild–American Federation of Television and Radio Artists (SAG-AFTRA) published a policy mandating the inclusion of intimacy coordinators.

In 2018, the group performed an exhibition, #MeToo Shakespeare, explaining the importance of intimacy choreography.
