= Tebi Rex =

Irish hip hop duo

- Origin: County Kildare, Ireland
- Genres: Indie; hip hop; pop
- Years active: 2016–present
- Members: Max Zanga; Matt O'Baoill; DJ R3D; Aaron "The Banger" Kelly
- Website: Official website

Tebi Rex are an Irish hip hop duo from County Kildare.

== Career ==
Tebi Rex was formed in Maynooth in 2016 by Max Zanga and Matt O'Baoill. Tebi Rex's music has been described as alternative indie-hip hop pop, a sound catalysed by the duality between the duo's two styles. Max Zanga is the rapper while Matt O'Baoill is his melodic foil, providing hooks and choruses. They are part of the Word Up Collective, a collective of independent Irish artists.

Music from The Young Will Eat The Old was featured in Normal People, a television series released in 2020.

Tebi Rex released their second album It's Gonna Be Okay in 2021.

== Discography ==
=== Albums ===
- The Young Will Eat the Old (2019)
- It's Gonna Be Okay (2021)
- Fin. (2025)

=== Singles and EPs ===
- Ducks-to-Position EP (2016)
- "Icarus" (2016)
- "She Hated Love Songs II" (2017) ft. Elkin
- Welcome to the Darkest Year of Our Adventures EP (2018)
- "Smdftb Freestyle" (2018) ft. R3D
- "Peggy's Bus" (2018)
- "No. 1 Symbol of Peace" (2019)
- "Financial Controller" (2019)
- "I Never Got Off the Bus" (2019)
- "White Boy of the Month" (2020)
- "I Got My Whole" (2020)
- Brackets EP (2020)
- "Oh It Hurts" (2021)
- "Hanging with Trees" (2021)
- "Who Asked Fatboy?" (2021) ft. Bricknasty, F3miii
- "Deadman II" (2021)
- "Deadman" (2021)
- "IMTHEBEST" (2023)
- "People Pleaser" (2023)
- Sitcom EP (2023)
- "Fin." (2025)
- "I'm cooked, I'm done." (2025) ft. Natalya O'Flaherty
- "Ireland's full." (2025)
- "Not with a fizzle fr." (2025)
