= Ita O'Brien =

British acting teacher

- Born: 10 February 1965; Bromley, United Kingdom
- Education: Royal Central School of Speech and Drama
- Occupations: Intimacy coordinator Intimacy director Movement director Choreographer
- Years active: 2006–present
- Known for: Normal People; I May Destroy You; Gentleman Jack; Sex Education; Philip K. Dick's Electric Dreams; The Girl with All the Gifts
- Website: www.intimacyonset.com

Ita O’Brien is a British movement director and intimacy co-ordinator for film, TV and theatre. She has taught at some of Britain's leading drama schools, has published research and devised her own work. In 2017, O'Brien introduced the "Intimacy On Set Guidelines", to protect performers during scenes that involve sex or nudity, which gained significant industry and public interest in the wake of the Harvey Weinstein scandals. She has worked for Amazon, BBC, HBO, and Netflix.

== Early life and education ==
O'Brien's family is from Clonmel, Ireland. She graduated in 1998 from the Bristol Old Vic Theatre School. She also trained as a dancer at the Royal Academy of Dancing. In 2007, she received a master of arts in movement studies from the Royal Central School of Speech and Drama.

== Career ==
Ita O'Brien pioneered the role of intimacy coordinator, which is gaining adoption in leading production houses, including HBO, Netflix, and the BBC. O'Brien has been developing practices when working with intimacy, scenes with sexual content and nudity in film, TV and theatre since 2014. In the absence of any industry-wide guidelines or accepted process, she developed draft guidelines for intimacy, simulated sex scenes and nudity. She is the founder of Intimacy on Set, her company set up in 2018, which provides services to TV, film and theatre when dealing with intimacy, sexual content, and nudity.

There was brief controversy when, on the BAFTA red carpet in 2018, Andy Serkis likened the idea of guidelines to censorship. However, O'Brien says, "These guidelines are not a constraint, but an improvement on current practice. They free the actor to embody the character whilst delivering repeatable and safe scenes that facilitate the Director's vision."

The guidelines have received the support of Women in Film and Television (UK) and leading industry figures, including Gemma Arterton, Noma Dumezweni, Olivia Colman, Joseph Millson and David Farr.

Her work has received press coverage, particularly for Normal People, Sex Education, and Gentleman Jack. She has been an advocate for the use of an intimacy coordinator in Australia, New Zealand, Germany, Ireland, and UK.

In 2021, upon receiving a BAFTA for Best Actress for I May Destroy You, Michaela Coel dedicated her award to O'Brien, saying "Thank you for your existence in our industry, for making the space safe, for creating physical, emotional and professional boundaries so that we can make work about exploitation, loss of respect, about abuse of power without being exploited or abused in the process". In all, O'Brien worked on six TV productions that were nominated for a BAFTA in 2021.

In 2022, O'Brien became the first intimacy coordinator to be employed by the Royal Opera House in a Katie Mitchell production of Theodora.

== Film and TV ==
Her credits include The Last Duel (2021), It's a Sin (2021), Normal People (2020), I May Destroy You (2020), Sex Education (2019), Philip K. Dick's Electric Dreams (2017), Derren Brown's Ghost Train (2017), series 2 of Humans (2016), The Girl With All The Gifts (2016) and many theatre productions.
