= NetGalley =

Web site aimed towards the distribution of digital galley proofs of books

- Website type: Review
- Owners: Firebrand Technologies, Rosetta Solutions, Inc.
- Website: netgalley.com
- Registration: Paid and free
- Launched: 2008
- Current status: Active

NetGalley is a website launched in 2008, aiming to distribute digital galley proofs of books, some of which have not yet been released. NetGalley was developed as an alternative to producing paper galleys and has since evolved into a key marketing and publicity platform for publishers and authors. Publishers that offer e-galleys include Hachette, HarperCollins Publishers, Penguin Random House, Simon & Schuster, and many others in the US, the UK, Australia, Canada, France, Germany, and Japan. The site offers electronic galleys to "professional readers" such as booksellers, educators, librarians, media professionals, and reviewers.

== History ==
The NetGalley website was created in 2008 as a joint venture between Firebrand Technologies and Rosetta Solutions. Initially launched shortly before the 2008 BookExpo America, Rosetta Solutions founded the site, and Firebrand Technologies took over in December 2008. NetGalley has since widened its roster of publishers and range of reviewers, and has begun offering services to publishers in the UK, France, Germany, and Japan.

In 2012, the site began offering expedited approvals to librarians who added their American Library Association member number. NetGalley also began a partnership with the Library Journal for reviews of original ebooks in the romance genre; Library Journal stated it was "a move designed to address 'the skyrocketing popularity of ebooks in U.S. public libraries'".

In October 2012, the NetGalley website relaunched, addressing numerous performance and scaling issues related to an old architecture, improving existing features, and introducing new ones.

In December 2020, NetGalley sent out an email to its users explaining that they experienced a data breach and the personal information of many users had been exposed. This included usernames, passwords, first and last names and addresses specified in their NetGalley profiles.

== Features ==
The site layout allows users to search the books available for review by publisher, genre, or upload date on NetGalley. Users request the books they want, while a representative for the publisher decides to approve or decline the request. If approved, the user usually chooses among EPUB, PDF, MOBI, or audiobook formats.

In July 2020, NetGalley introduced audiobooks as an additional format for publishers to provide readers. It also simultaneously launched the first NetGalley mobile app - the NetGalley Shelf app (available for iOS and Android). In January 2025, NetGalley announced that it would replace Adobe's proprietary digital rights management (DRM) with Readium Licensed Content Protection (LCP).

== Reception ==
Reception to the site has been mixed. ALA TechSource wrote: "Whatever it lacks in aesthetics, NetGalley makes up for with simple ease of use and great content." NetGalley reported that in 2011, the site had seen a 500% increase in reviews compared to previous years.
