= Sally Rooney =

Irish author

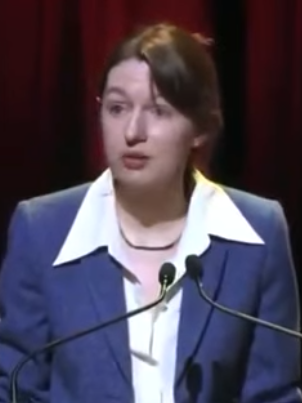
- Rooney in 2024
- Born: 1990 or 1991 (age 35–36); Castlebar, County Mayo, Ireland
- Education: Trinity College Dublin (BA, 2013)
- Occupations: Author; screenwriter
- Spouse: John Prasifka (m. 2020)
- Writing career
- Language: English
- Years active: 2017–present
- Period: Modern
- Genres: Literary fiction, psychological fiction
- Notable works: Conversations with Friends (2017); Normal People (2018); Beautiful World, Where Are You (2021); Intermezzo (2024)
- Notable awards: Costa Book Awards (2018); Irish Book Awards (2018) Encore Award (2019)

Sally Rooney (born 1990 or 1991) is an Irish author. She is best known for her novels Conversations with Friends (2017), Normal People (2018), Beautiful World, Where Are You (2021), and Intermezzo (2024). The first two works were adapted into the television miniseries Normal People (2020) and Conversations with Friends (2022).

Rooney's novels have been critically acclaimed, sold millions of copies, and been translated into many languages. Normal People won the Costa Book Award and the Irish Book Award in 2018, and the Encore Award in 2019. Rooney has also written several works of short fiction and poetry.

Rooney has called herself both a feminist and a Marxist, and much of her work addresses related topics. She is active in both political and social circles, regularly expressing her views on global topics, movements, and discussions. She is a prominent advocate of Palestinian liberation, and the Palestine Action group in particular, which has led to her being banned in the United Kingdom from public speaking and from receiving royalties for her works.

== Early life and education ==
Rooney was born in Castlebar, County Mayo, in 1990 or 1991, where she also grew up. Her father, Kieran Rooney, worked for Telecom Éireann and her mother, Marie Farrell, ran an arts centre. Rooney has an older brother and a younger sister.

Rooney studied English at Trinity College Dublin (TCD), where she was elected a scholar in 2011 and graduated with a BA in 2013.

While attending Trinity College Dublin, Rooney was a university debater and in 2013 became the top debater at the European Universities Debating Championships. She has written about the experience.

== Career ==
=== Early career ===
Before becoming a writer, Rooney worked for a restaurant in an administrative role.

Rooney completed her first novel—which she has called "absolute trash"—at age 15. Her first published works were two poems in The Stinging Fly, submitted to the magazine when she was in secondary school. She began writing "constantly" in late 2014. She completed her debut novel, Conversations with Friends, while studying for her master's degree in American literature. She wrote 100,000 words of the book in three months.

In 2015, her essay "Even If You Beat Me", about her time as the "top competitive debater on the continent of Europe", was seen by an agent, Tracy Bohan, of the Wylie Agency. Bohan contacted Rooney, but Rooney was hesitant to send her any new material at first.

She had seen my story and wondered whether I had anything else she could read... But I didn't send her anything for ages... I don't know why. I didn't want her to see this shoddy draft.

Rooney eventually sent Bohan a manuscript, and Bohan circulated it to publishers, receiving seven bids.

=== Conversations with Friends (2017) ===
Rooney signed with Bohan and the Wylie Agency, and Conversations with Friends was subject to a seven-party auction for its publishing rights, which were eventually sold in 12 countries. The novel was published in June 2017 by Faber & Faber. It was nominated for the 2018 Swansea University International Dylan Thomas Prize, and the 2018 Folio Prize, and won the 2017 Sunday Times/Peters Fraser & Dunlop Young Writer of the Year Award.

In March 2017, her short story "Mr Salary" was shortlisted for the Sunday Times Short Story Award. In November 2017, Rooney was announced as editor of the Irish literary magazine The Stinging Fly. She was a contributing writer to the magazine. She oversaw the magazine's two issues in 2018, before handing the editorship over to Danny Denton.

In 2018, Rooney was announced as taking part in the Cúirt International Festival of Literature.

=== Normal People (2018) ===
Rooney's second novel, Normal People, was published in September 2018, also by Faber & Faber. The novel grew out of Rooney's exploration of the history between the two main characters of her short story "At the Clinic", which was first published in London-based literary magazine The White Review in 2016. In July 2018, Normal People was longlisted for that year's Man Booker Prize. On 27 November 2018, the work won "Irish Novel of the Year" at the Irish Book Awards and was named Waterstones' Book of the Year for 2018. In January 2019, it won the Costa Book Award (formerly the Whitbread) for the Novel category. It was longlisted for the 2019 Dylan Thomas Prize and the 2019 Women's Prize for Fiction. It has been translated into 46 languages and earned praise from Barack Obama and Taylor Swift, among others.

==== Television adaptations ====
Normal People was made into a 12-part series as a co-production of BBC Three and the online platform Hulu, with filming taking place in Dublin and County Sligo. The series was directed by Lenny Abrahamson and Hettie Macdonald. Daisy Edgar-Jones and Paul Mescal played Marianne and Connell, respectively. The series was a critical success and earned four Primetime Emmy Award nominations including for Outstanding Lead Actor in a Limited Series or Movie, Outstanding Directing for a Limited Series, and Outstanding Writing for a Limited Series.

In May 2022, Conversations with Friends was also made into a 12-episode BBC Three/Hulu miniseries, by the same creative team behind Normal People, including director Lenny Abrahamson and co-writer Alice Birch.

=== Beautiful World, Where Are You (2021) ===
In April 2019, the New York Public Library's Dorothy and Lewis B. Cullman Center for Scholars and Writers announced its 2019 class of fellows, which included Rooney. The press release read, "she will be writing a new novel under the working title Beautiful World, Where Are You, examining aesthetics and political crisis." The novel was published by Farrar, Straus and Giroux in the United States and by Faber in the UK and Ireland in September 2021. She did not accept any options to adapt the novel, having found the other adaptations, and discourse about the Normal People adaptation in particular, had distracted from writing.

=== Intermezzo (2024) ===
Rooney's fourth novel, Intermezzo, was released in September 2024. The novel focuses on the complicated relationship between two brothers dealing with grief after their father's death. Central themes include an exploration of complicated family dynamics and the expectations of romantic relationships.

Intermezzo won the 2025 Sky Arts Award for literature. Rooney did not accept the award in person, saying she had been advised against entering the United Kingdom because her support for Palestine Action put her at risk of arrest.

== Reception and sales ==
Rooney's novels have been critically acclaimed and commercially successful, with literary commentators regarding her as one of the foremost millennial writers. By around 2019, her novels had been translated into over 47 languages. The feminist themes in Rooney's works have made them popular in China, where they have been best-sellers.

In 2022, Time named Rooney among the 100 most influential people in the world.

By October 2024, her novels had sold more than 6 million copies worldwide.

=== Awards ===
- 2017 The Sunday Times Young Writer of the Year
- 2018 Irish Book Awards Novel of the Year – Normal People
- 2018 Costa Book Awards – Normal People
- 2019 Encore Award – Normal People
- 2022 Dalkey Literary Awards – Beautiful World, Where Are You
- 2024 Irish Book Awards Author of the Year
- 2025 Sky Arts Award for literature – Intermezzo

== Political views ==
Rooney describes herself as a feminist and a Marxist; both her parents are socialists and instilled socialist values in Rooney. Rooney has said that her work has a Marxist character, and noted that her characters tend to live in economically precarious conditions despite often being college-educated.

During the 2018 referendum on the legality of abortion in Ireland, Rooney campaigned for a Yes vote.

=== Support for Palestine ===
Rooney supports the Boycott, Divestment and Sanctions (BDS) movement, which promotes boycotts, divestments, and economic sanctions against Israel in order to force the Israeli government to withdraw from the occupied territories and grant Palestinians full equality, among other demands. Her first two books were translated into Hebrew by the Israeli publisher Modan, but Rooney denied their request to translate Beautiful World, Where Are You, as Modan did not comply with the demands of BDS, having published books for the Israeli Defense Ministry. (Note: Rooney said at the time that if she could find a way to sell the Hebrew-language rights to the novel compliant with BDS guidelines, she would be happy to do so.) Two Israeli bookshop chains announced the withdrawal of all Rooney titles from their shelves; Modan continued to sell the two it had translated. In a letter organised by Artists for Palestine UK, 70 writers and publishers, including Kevin Barry, Rachel Kushner, Geoff Dyer, Pankaj Mishra, Carmen Callil, and Ahdaf Soueif, supported Rooney's decision. In October 2024, Rooney signed an open letter pledging not to work with Israeli cultural institutions.

In June 2025, Rooney praised Palestine Action after its members broke into RAF Brize Norton and sprayed the engines of two Airbus A330 MRTT tankers with red paint, and criticised the British Government's intention to define the group as a terrorist organisation. She supported a Palestine Action co-founder's attempt in the High Court to block the government's ban before it came into effect on 5 July 2025 in a written submission to the court, in which she called herself a "committed supporter". Ultimately, the British government banned Palestine Action under the Terrorism Act in July 2025. The ban prevented Rooney from speaking at public events in the United Kingdom. Rooney said in November 2025 that Element Pictures, the production company behind her BBC adaptations, had cautioned her that it would be illegal for it to make royalty payments to her if she used or was suspected of using the money to support the group.

In May 2026, it was announced that Intermezzo would be published in Hebrew by November Books, +972 Magazine, and Local Call, all deemed compliant with BDS. In October 2026, Rooney announced that her books would no longer be sold in the UK owing to her support for Palestine Action. Faber said that they had taken the decision in consultation with Rooney, and that it would be "unconscionable" to sell her work and not be allowed to pass on earnings on it. Rooney's stance was supported by writers Zadie Smith, Ahdaf Soueif, Arundhati Roy and Annie Ernaux and actors Paul Mescal, Daisy Edgar-Jones, Tilda Swinton and Susan Sarandon. Children's Laureates Chris Haughton and Nicola Davies supported Rooney by pledging to give her some of their royalties.

== Personal life ==
Rooney studied in Dublin and spent time in New York City. Since then and as of August 2021 Rooney has lived in her childhood hometown of Castlebar. She married John Prasifka, a mathematics teacher.

== Published works ==
=== Novels ===
- Conversations with Friends. London: Faber & Faber. 2017. ISBN 9780571333127.
- Normal People. London: Faber & Faber. 2018. ISBN 9780571334643.
- Beautiful World, Where Are You. London: Faber & Faber. 2021. ISBN 9780571365425.
- Intermezzo. London: Faber & Faber. 2024. ISBN 9780571365463.

=== Short fiction ===
- After Eleanor Left. Vol. 1. Ballinafad: Winter Pages. Winter 2015. pp. 25–30. ISBN 9780993302909.
- Concord 34. Vol. 63. Dublin: The Dublin Review. Summer 2016. ISBN 9780992991579.
- At the Clinic. Vol. 18. London: The White Review. September 2016. ISBN 9780992756291.
  - Features prototypes of characters Marianne and Connell from 2018's Normal People.
- "Robbie Brady's astonishing late goal takes its place in our personal histories". New Statesman. 10 August 2017.
- Mr Salary. London: Faber & Faber. 3 January 2019. p. 48. ISBN 9780571351954. OCLC 1104816821.

(First published in Granta 135: New Irish Writing Fiction on 19 April 2016.)

- "Color and Light". The New Yorker. 11 March 2019.

(Also published in Being Various: New Irish Short Stories. London: Faber & Faber. 2019. ISBN 9780571342501.)

- "Unread Messages". The New Yorker. 5 July 2021.

=== Poetry ===
- "Tírghrá". The Stinging Fly. 2 (15). Spring 2010.
- "Impossibilities". The Stinging Fly. 2 (15). Spring 2010.
- "The Stillest Horse". The Stinging Fly. 2 (23). Winter 2012.
- "After a Road Traffic Accident, Chennai". The Stinging Fly. 2 (28). Summer 2014.
- "The Most Amazing Live Instrumental Performance You Have Ever Heard". The Stinging Fly. 2 (30). Spring 2015. ISBN 9781906539443
- "Seven AM in April". The Stinging Fly. 2 (30). Spring 2015.
- "An Account of Vital Clues Which Appear To You In A Dream". The Stinging Fly. 2 (30). Spring 2015. ISBN 9781906539443
- "It Is Monday". The Stinging Fly. 2 (30). Spring 2015. ISBN 9781906539443
- "Have I Been Severe?". The Stinging Fly. 2 (30). Spring 2015. ISBN 9781906539443
- "Leaving You". The Stinging Fly. 2 (30). Spring 2015.

=== Essays ===
- Even if you beat me. Vol. 58. The Dublin Review. Spring 2015. ISBN 9780992991524.
- "An App to Cure My Fainting Spells". The New Yorker. 20 November 2017.
- "An Irish Problem". London Review of Books. 40 (10). 24 May 2018.
- Rooney, Sally (7 December 2022). "Misreading Ulysses". The Paris Review.

=== Audiobooks ===
- Sally Rooney (11 May 2020). Two Stories (Audiobook). Narrated by Aoife McMahon & Sam O'Mahony. London: Audible & Faber & Faber.

This audiobook contains unabridged readings of the stories "Mr Salary" and "Color and Light", previously published in Granta and The New Yorker, respectively.

=== Book reviews ===
- Rooney, Sally (9 February 2018). "Troubled Marriages, Old and New". The New York Times.

== Television ==
Year	Title	Role	Notes
2020	Normal People	Writer / executive producer	12 episodes: Hulu & BBC Three
2022	Conversations with Friends	Executive producer	12 episodes: Hulu & BBC Three
