= Intimacy coordinator =

Worker in film and television productions

An intimacy coordinator is an occupation in the film and television industries. They are "an advocate, a liaison between actors and production, and a movement coach and/or choreographer in regards to nudity and simulated sex, and other intimate and hyper-exposed scenes".

Intimacy coordinators are distinguished from intimacy directors who are associated with live performance roles, such as theatre, dance, circus, performance art, and fashion shows.

== History ==
While intimacy coordinators already existed in the realm of live theater, demand for their role gained significant traction within Hollywood and television and streaming platforms after the 2017 Weinstein scandal and the subsequent rise of the #MeToo movement. These events highlighted the often routine nature of sexual harassment and misconduct that actors, particularly women, routinely faced within the industry. Actresses such as Emily Meade began to demand professional safeguards for their well-being on set. They pointed out the imbalanced power dynamics often seen in productions, which could leave actors—particularly young and inexperienced ones—feeling too powerless to speak up if directors, staff members or other actors disregarded their consent or previous agreements regarding intimate scenes.

=== Hollywood ===
With the popularization of the #MeToo movement, numerous Hollywood-based actors joined the movement and fostered a new environment where actors began coming forward to share their stories about sexual assault while filming. This large-scale movement unearthed many instances of sexual harassment throughout Hollywood, most notably shedding light on the producer Harvey Weinstein, who had 80 allegations of sexual harassment against him. Following this time, the calls for the film industry to take charge and protect its actors became more pronounced, and it became apparent that changes needed to be made in the industry.

=== Television and streaming platforms ===
In 2017, the London talent agency Carey Dodd Associates fronted a campaign for an industry standard in handling scenes of intimacy using guidelines developed by Ita O'Brien. In October 2018, television network HBO adopted a policy of using intimacy coordinators for all its series and films with intimate scenes. Soon after, other networks such as Netflix, Starz, Hulu, and Amazon began exploring the use of intimacy coordinators, and by 2020 there were 23 Emmy-nominated scripted programs that worked with intimacy coordinators. In January 2019, Netflix released Sex Education, its first production that used an intimacy coordinator, Ita O'Brien.

During HBO's filming of Game of Thrones, Emilia Clarke often spoke of feeling like she was too inexperienced of an actress to fight the nudity requirements on the show. With this, multiple other actresses in the Game of Thrones cast spoke of similar discomfort when filming nude scenes on the show. Since then, HBO has adopted the use of intimacy coordinators in all intimate scenes, including with the newest series in the franchise like House of the Dragon. Actor Emily Carey, who played young Alicent Hightower in the series, recalled how nervous they were to film an intimate scene with Paddy Considine during production. But, they credited the series' intimacy coordinator, Miriam Lucia, for helping them feel safe and calm while filming these intimate scenes.

== Function ==
According to Intimacy Directors International, a nonprofit organization founded in 2016 that advocates for the function, an intimacy coordinator is expected to ensure that:

- all staff and actors are aware of the context of the intimacy as part of the story,
- communication about the intimacy takes place among participants, and avenues for reporting harassment are available,
- actors continually consent to all scenes of intimacy,
- all scenes of intimacy are performed according to a previously agreed-to choreography, and
- actors are encouraged to mark the end of each intimate scene with a moment to signal the return to real-life interaction.

=== Implementation ===
There are many different instances in which a production set would require an intimacy coordinator. The job of an intimacy coordinator is not to ruin creativity, but rather to help produce that creativity in a way that is safe for all those involved. Scenes involving simulated sex and/or kissing, power dynamics, suggestive movements, and sexual trauma would be instances where an intimacy coordinator would be necessary during filming. Following the #MeToo Movement and the recent changes to laws surrounding intimacy filming standards, the use of an intimacy coordinator has become an accepted industry standard.

== Recommended standards and protocols ==
The Screen Actors Guild–American Federation of Television and Radio Artists (SAG-AFTRA) lists a series of expertise and training expectations, as well as additional requirements for intimacy coordinators.

=== Expertise and training ===
- consent training
- anti-harassment/anti-sexual harassment training
- movement coaching and masking techniques
- proper use of modesty garments and barriers
- mediation or conflict resolution training
- gender identity and sexual orientation training
- anti-racist/diversity, equity, and inclusion training
- bystander intervention
- mental health first aid, trauma stewardship, or related training

=== Additional requirements ===
- State and federal background check
- Experience and an ability to adapt and implement the roles, responsibilities, functions, and protocols on a variety of sets
- Maintain the confidentiality of an actor's work and experience in performing highly sensitive scenes unless they have the actor's permission to publicly share this information.

== Backgrounds ==
Intimacy coordinators come from a variety of backgrounds. Some have roots as fight and movement directors, others as stage-combat teachers and stunt performers, or are experienced as aerialists, choreographers, and dancers. For others, their creative practice is in acting or as acting coaches. Often, productions will use an intimacy coordinator along with a mental health coordinator—some people are both. Furthermore, some have groundings as sex and relationship coaches or as psychotherapists.

== Industry reactions ==
=== Positive industry reactions ===
Actors and filmmakers both in the UK and the United States have supported the implementation of intimacy coordinators. In 2019, the US actors' union SAG-AFTRA created an official agreement with Intimacy Coordinators International in hopes of raising awareness of the importance of intimacy coordinators when filming, and British actors' union Equity, created a support network called Safe Space. Safe Space was designed to help increase reporting of sexual harassment cases and to ensure that everyone feels safe when doing so. The addition of these organizations to filming in both the US and UK has made the industry safer and more comfortable for actors, while also lessening the legal risk that certain films may face surrounding the production of intimate scenes. Following this movement, intimacy coordinators have been used in a number of popular productions, including Bridgerton, Euphoria, and I May Destroy You.

The fourth season of the TV series High Maintenance featured a storyline on an intimacy coordinator. Series co-creator and director Katja Blichfeld spoke in support of the profession, noting it was "a relief to be able to turn to a person for these moments that, in the past, we've had to navigate to our best ability."

=== Negative industry reactions ===
Some actors and filmmakers have criticized the implementation of intimacy coordinators.

American actor and producer Michael Douglas has spoken out against the practice, as has Argentine-Italian filmmaker Gaspar Noé. British actor Michael Caine has questioned the need for the use of intimacy coordinators on set, stating how he feels that they interfere with the shooting of intimate scenes between actors.

Actor Sean Bean in an interview with Variety criticized the practice stating "I think the natural way lovers behave would be ruined by someone bringing it right down to a technical exercise". French film director and screen writer Mia Hansen-Løve has also spoken against the use of intimacy coordinators, calling them "some kind of virtue police". Australian actress Toni Collette has said that the use of intimacy coordinators on set have made her feel "more anxious" but stated that they bring a "new energy" to set.

Sam Levinson's 2023 TV series The Idol satirized the use of intimacy coordinators.

== Sources ==
- Pace, Chelsea (2020). Staging Sex: Best Practices, Tools, and Techniques for Theatrical Intimacy. Taylor & Francis. ISBN 978-0-429-94645-5.
- Haney, Brooke M. (2024). The Intimacy Coordinator's Guidebook: Specialities for Stage and Screen. Routledge. ISBN 9781032531465.
- Barclay, Kari (2020). Directing Desire: Intimacy Directing, Consent, and Simuated Sexuality on the Contemporary U.S. Stage (PhD thesis). Stanford University. ProQuest 2570103458.
- Haney, Brooke M. (2025). A History of Intimacy Professionals in Entertainment: An Inside Look at a Movement. Routledge (published 1 August 2025). ISBN 9781032780283.
