= Normal People =

2018 novel by Sally Rooney

- First edition cover
- Author: Sally Rooney
- Audio read by: Aoife McMahon
- Language: English
- Genre: Love (Romance)
- Set in: Dublin and Carricklea, County Sligo
- Publisher: Faber & Faber
- Publication date: 30 August 2018
- Publication place: Ireland
- Media type: Print
- Pages: 266
- Awards: 2019 British Book Award for Book of the Year
- ISBN: 978-0-571-33464-3
- OCLC: 1061023590
- Dewey Decimal: 823/.92
- LC Class: PR6118.O59 N67 2018

Normal People is a 2018 novel by the Irish author Sally Rooney. Normal People is Rooney's second novel, published after Conversations with Friends (2017). It was first published by Faber & Faber on 30 August 2018. The book became a bestseller in the United States, selling almost 64,000 copies in hardcover in its first four months of release. It was also a bestseller in China, where its coming of age theme was popular with younger readers. A critically acclaimed and Emmy nominated television adaptation of the same name aired from April 2020 on BBC Three and Hulu. A number of publications ranked it one of the best books of the 2010s.

== Synopsis ==
The novel follows the complex friendship and relationship between two teenagers from different social classes, Connell and Marianne, who both attend the same secondary school in County Sligo, Ireland, and, later, Trinity College Dublin (TCD). It is set during the post-2008 Irish economic downturn, from 2011 through 2015.

Connell is a popular, handsome, and highly intelligent secondary school student raised by a working-class single mother. Marianne is also highly intelligent but is considered intimidating and a social outcast at their school. Lorraine, Connell's mother, is warm and loving towards him, while Marianne's mother and brother are emotionally abusive towards her. Marianne's wealthy mother employs Lorraine as a housecleaner, allowing Marianne and Connell to meet. They are attracted to each other and begin a sexual relationship, bonding over their mutual interest in literature and politics. Marianne convinces Connell to apply to Trinity College with her. Connell keeps their affair a secret from his friends and invites a popular classmate, Rachel, to the Debs as his date, humiliating Marianne.

After the summer, Connell and Marianne run into each other at Trinity and reconcile. Marianne blossoms at university, becoming pretty and popular, while Connell struggles to fit in. They become close friends and resume their sexual relationship. Connell is unable to afford rent in Dublin for the summer and too embarrassed to ask to move in with Marianne. He asks whether Marianne would want to see other people while he is away, which she interprets as him breaking off their relationship.

Marianne begins dating Jamie, the self-centered son of a wealthy banker who is also a sadist. Connell begins a relationship with Helen, another student at Trinity, though he remains friends with Marianne.

Marianne breaks up with Jamie, causing much of her social circle to turn against her. She studies abroad for a year in Sweden and keeps in touch with Connell by email. Connell experiences severe depression and anxiety after discovering that a friend from secondary school has died by suicide. He brings Helen to the funeral, which Marianne also attends. Helen questions Connell's continued interest in Marianne, and they eventually break up.

Connell and Marianne remain close over the summer, frequently visiting each other. Marianne encourages Connell's interest in writing and supports him through his depression. They admit their continued feelings for each other and begin to have sex, though Marianne leaves after Connell refuses to hit her. When Marianne's abusive brother injures her, Connell confronts him and takes her to safety. When they return to Trinity, they move in together. Connell receives a surprise acceptance to an MFA program in New York City and offers to reject it, knowing Marianne would like to stay in Dublin, but Marianne encourages him to attend even though they will be apart, saying he knows that she will always be there for him.

== Reception ==
Normal People was longlisted for the 2018 Man Booker Prize. It was voted the 2018 Waterstones Book of the Year and won Best Novel at the 2018 Costa Book Awards. In 2019, the novel was longlisted for the Women's Prize for Fiction. The same year, it ranked 25th on The Guardian's list of "The 100 Best Books of the 21st Century, where it was also listed as one of the books that "defined the decade".

Irish Independent editor Fionnán Sheahan called the book a polemic, noting that Rooney has called herself a Marxist and that the book features discussions about The Communist Manifesto and Doris Lessing's feminist novel The Golden Notebook.

Entertainment Weekly writers ranked the book the 10th-best of the decade, with Seija Rankin writing, "Both of Sally Rooney's novels capture the millennial ethos with raw honesty and impeccable insight. But what she broke ground with in Conversations With Friends, she perfected in Normal People."

In The New York Times, Dwight Garner wrote, "Sally Rooney's sentences are droll, nimble and matter-of-fact. There's nothing particularly special about them, except for the way she throws them. She's like one of those elite magicians who can make a playing card pierce the rind of a watermelon."

== Awards ==
Year	Award	Category	Result	Ref
2018	Costa Book Award	Novel	Won	
2018	Irish Book Award	Novel	Won	
2018	Man Booker Prize	—	Longlisted	
2018	Waterstones Book of the Year	—	Won	
2019	British Book Award	Book of the Year	Won	
2019	Dylan Thomas Prize	—	Longlisted	
2019	Encore Award	—	Won	
2019	Kerry Group Irish Fiction Award	—	Shortlisted	
2019	Women's Prize for Fiction	—	Longlisted	
2019	The Writers' Prize	—	Longlisted	
2020	Andrew Carnegie Medals for Excellence	Fiction	Longlisted	
2020	Europese Literatuurprijs	—	Shortlisted	
2020	International Dublin Literary Award	—	Longlisted	

== Adaptation ==
In May 2019, BBC Three and Hulu announced that a TV series based on the novel was set to be produced. It premiered on 26 April 2020 on BBC Three and 27 April 2020 on the Australian streaming service Stan. In Ireland, the series began airing on RTÉ One on 28 April 2020. The series stars Daisy Edgar-Jones as Marianne and Paul Mescal as Connell. The show garnered critical acclaim and became BBC iPlayer's most-watched show of 2020 with over 62 million streams that year.

== Themes ==
Normal People has themes of love across class division. The main characters, Marianne and Connell, know each other from school but also because Connell's mother is a cleaner for Marianne's mother. This establishes the class divide in their relationship.

Marianne and Connell have different views of their socioeconomic backgrounds. Connell feels that he is trapped in a cycle where the money he spends on Marianne comes from his mother who gets it from Marianne's family whereas Marianne seems unbothered by spending money. Connell lets the class divide come between them numerous times as he fears how he will be perceived. In school, Connell is popular and well liked by his classmates, unlike Marianne. This causes him to ask her to keep their relationship secret so that people do not find out his mum works for hers.

When the pair both attend Trinity College, the class division becomes more apparent. Marianne easily fits in with her upper-class classmates who come from similar backgrounds, some of whom look down on Connell for his lower socioeconomic status. As their relationship continues, their class background drives them apart. Marianne and Connell start to find friends and partners in their respective social classes. When Marianne starts to date Jamie in their second year at university, Connell feels out of place in her world because of his lack of wealth.

Socioeconomic class drives Marianne and Connell apart as they navigate early adulthood. Rooney uses these characters to explore how class divides keep people apart.
