= 2025 South by Southwest Film & TV Festival =

Edition of film and television festival

South by Southwest
- Location: Austin, Texas, U.S.
- Founded: 1987
- Hosted by: SXSW, LLC.
- Festival date: March 7–15, 2025
- Language: English
- Website: www.sxsw.com
- 2026 2024

The 2025 South by Southwest Film & TV Festival took place from March 7–15 at several venues in Austin, Texas, as part of the larger South by Southwest annual event. The festival opened with the film Another Simple Favor and the debut of the comedy series The Studio. It closed with the American premiere of On Swift Horses.

== Feature films ==
=== Headliner ===
English title	Director(s)	Production country
The Accountant 2	Gavin O'Connor	United States
Another Simple Favor	Paul Feig	United States
Ash	Flying Lotus	United States
Death of a Unicorn	Alex Scharfman	United States
Drop	Christopher Landon	United States
Holland	Mimi Cave	United States

=== Narrative Feature Competition ===
English title	Director(s)	Production country
Bunny	Ben Jacobson	United States
Fantasy Life	Matthew Shear	United States
Fucktoys	Annapurna Sriram	United States
It Ends	Alexander Ullom	United States
My Uncle Jens	Brwa Vahabpour	Norway
Outerlands	Elena Oxman	United States
Reeling	Yana Alliata	United States
Slanted	Amy Wang	United States

=== Documentary Feature Competition ===
English title	Director(s)	Production country
Arrest the Midwife	Elaine Epstein	United States
Assembly	Rashaad Newsome, Johnny Symons	United States
Baby Doe	Jessica Earnshaw	United States
The Python Hunt	Xander Robin	United States
Remaining Native	Paige Bethmann	United States
The Secret of Me	Grace Hughes-Hallett	United Kingdom
Shuffle	Benjamin Flaherty	United States
The Spies Among Us	Jamie Coughlin Silverman, Gabriel Silverman	United States

=== Narrative Spotlight ===
English title	Director(s)	Production country
American Sweatshop	Uta Briesewitz	Germany, United States
The Astronaut	Jess Varley	United States
The Baltimorons	Jay Duplass	United States
Caper	Dean Imperial	United States
Clown in a Cornfield	Eli Craig	United States
Cotton Candy Bubble Gum	J Pinder	United States
The Dutchman	Andre Gaines	United States
For Worse	Amy Landecker	United States
Forge	Jing Ai Ng	United States
Idiotka	Nastasya Popov	United States
I Really Love My Husband	GG Hawkins	United States
Lifehack	Ronan Corrigan	United Kingdom
Magic Hour	Katie Aselton	United States
Mermaid	Tyler Cornack	United States
One More Shot	Nicholas Clifford	Australia
O'Dessa	Geremy Jasper	United States
$POSITIONS	Brandon Daley	United States
Satisfaction	Alex Burunova	United States, Ukraine, Greece, Italy
She's The He	Siobhan McCarthy	United States
Summer of 69	Jillian Bell	United States
Surviving Earth	Thea Gajić	United Kingdom
Sweetness	Emma Higgins	Canada
The Rivals of Amziah King	Andrew Patterson	United Kingdom
The Threesome	Chad Hartigan	United States
The True Beauty of Being Bitten by a Tick	Pete Ohs	United States
Trash Baby	Jacy Mairs	United States
We Bury the Dead	Zak Hilditch	Australia

=== Documentary Spotlight ===
English title	Director(s)	Production country
The Age of Disclosure	Dan Farah	United States
American Sons	Andrew James Gonzales	United States
Are We Good?	Steven Feinartz	United States
ASCO: Without Permission	Travis Gutiérrez Senger	United States
Creede U.S.A	Kahane Corn Cooperman	United States
Dear Tomorrow	Kaspar Astrup Schröder	Denmark, Japan, Sweden
Deeper	Jennifer Peedom	Australia
Deepfaking Sam Altman	Adam Bhala Lough	United States
Flight 149: Hostage of War	Jenny Ash	United Kingdom
I'm Carl Lewis!	Julie Anderson, Chris Hay	United Kingdom
Luv Ya, Bum!	Sam Wainwright Douglas, David Hartstein	United States
Make It Look Real	Kate Blackmore	Australia
Mola: A Tibetan Tale of Love and Loss	Yangzom Brauen, Martin Brauen	United States, Switzerland
Now! More! Yes!	Max Hey	United States
Other Side	Heather Hogan, Carter Oakley	United States
Seen and Heard	Giselle Bailey, Phil Bertelsen	United States
Snow Leopard Sisters	Ben Ayers, Sonam Choekyi Lama, Andrew Lynch	United Kingdom
Spreadsheet Champions	Kristina Kraskov	Australia
Starman	Robert Stone	United States
Strange Journey: The Story of Rocky Horror	Linus O'Brien	United States
Take No Prisoners	Adam Ciralsky, Subrata De	United States
The Tallest Dwarf	Julie Forrest Wyman	United States
Uvalde Mom	Anayansi Prado	United States

=== Midnighter ===
English title	Director(s)	Production country
Descendent	Peter Cilella	United States
Good Boy	Ben Leonberg	United States
Hallow Road	Babak Anvari	Czechia, Ireland, United Kingdom
The Home	Mattias J Skoglund	Estonia, Iceland, Sweden
New Jack Fury	Lanfia Wal	United States
Nirvanna the Band the Show the Movie	Matt Johnson	Canada
Redux Redux	Kevin McManus, Matthew McManus	United States
The Surrender	Julia Max	United States

=== Visions ===
English title	Director(s)	Production country
Dead Lover	Grace Glowicki	Canada
Ghost Boy	Rodney Ascher	United States
The Infinite Husk	Aaron Silverstein	United States
Night Fight	Khary Saeed Jones	United States
Odyssey	Gerard Johnson	United Kingdom
We Are Storror	Michael Bay	United States
Your Higher Self	Annie St-Pierre	Canada

=== 24 Beats Per Second ===
English title	Director(s)	Production country
24 Hours of Grace	Steven Zhu	United States
42nd Street	José María Cabral	Dominican Republic
Boxcutter	Reza Dahya	Canada
Brother Verses Brother	Ari Gold	United States
Butthole Surfers: The Hole Truth and Nothing Butt	Tom Stern	United States
Forever We Are Young	Grace Lee, Patty Ahn	United States
La Salsa Vive	Juan Carvajal	Colombia
The Makings of Curtis Mayfield	H.E.R.	United States
Selena y Los Dinos	Isabel Castro	United States

=== Global ===
English title	Director(s)	Production country
Corina	Urzula Barba Hopfner	Mexico
Fury	Gemma Blasco	Spain
Glorious Summer	Helena Ganjalyan, Bartosz Szpak	Poland
Real Faces	Leni Huyghe	Belgium
Trans Memoria	Victoria Verseau	Sweden

=== Festival Favorite ===
English title	Director(s)	Production country
40 Acres	R. T. Thorne	Canada
The Ballad of Wallis Island	James Griffiths	United Kingdom
Deaf President Now!	Nyle DiMarco, Davis Guggenheim	United States
Friendship	Andrew DeYoung	United States
The Librarians	Kim A. Snyder	United States
Marlee Matlin: Not Alone Anymore	Shoshannah Stern	United States
On Swift Horses	Daniel Minahan	United States
The Perfect Neighbor	Geeta Gandbhir	United States
Sally	Cristina Costantini	United States
The Surfer	Lorcan Finnegan	Australia, Ireland
Together	Michael Shanks	Australia
Touch Me	Addison Heimann	United States
Zodiac Killer Project	Charlie Shackleton	United States, United Kingdom

== Short films ==
=== Narrative Short Competition ===
English title	Director(s)	Production country
24 Hours After Reading Tuesdays with Morrie	Scott Tinkham	United States
Baba I'm Fine	Karina Dandashi	United States
Ben's Sister	Emma Weinswig	United States
Brief Somebodies	Andy Reid	Canada
Entre Tormentas	Fran Zayas	United States
Grandma's Four Color Cards	Sally Tran	Vietnam
How Was Your Weekend?	Cam Banfield	United States
I'm The Most Racist Person I Know	Leela Varghese	Australia
Max Distance	Marissa Goldman	United States
Nervous Energy	Eve Liu	United States
Night Bloom	Tiye Amenechi	United States
One Day This Kid	Alexander Farah	Canada
Out for Delivery	Chelsea Christer	United States
The Sentry	Jake Wachtel	United States, Cambodia
The Singers	Sam Davis	United States
Strangers In The Same Shirt	Anthon Chase Johnson	United States
Synthesize Me	Bear Damen	United States, Netherlands
Unholy	Daisy Friedman	United States
WassupKaylee	Pepi Ginsberg	United States, France
Yú Cì (Fish Bones)	Kevin Xian Ming Yu	United States

=== Documentary Short Competition ===
English title	Director(s)	Production country
Armed only with a Camera: The Life and Death of Brent Renaud	Brent Renaud, Craig Renaud	United States
Camp Widow	Laura Green, Anna Moot-Levin	United States
Exodus	Nimco Sheikhaden	United States
The Goldfish Club	Max Henderson	United Kingdom
The Long Valley	Robert Machoian, Rodrigo Ojeda-Beck	United States
Looking For A Donkey	Juan Vicente Manrique	Mexico, Venezuela
Murewa	Ché Scott-Heron Newton	United Kingdom
Shanti Rides Shotgun	Charles Frank	United States
Tiger	Loren Waters	United States
We Beg To Differ	Ruairi Bradley	Ireland, United Kingdom
Welcome Home Freckles	Huiju Park	United Kingdom

=== Animated Short Competition ===
English title	Director(s)	Production country
Baggage	Lucy Davidson	Australia, United Kingdom
Detlev	Ferdinand Ehrhardt	Germany
The Dream Machine	Jimmy Marble	United States
Hurikán	Jan Saska	Bosnia and Herzegovina, Czechia, France, Slovakia
Mambo No. 2	Anne Feldmeier	Germany
Mine!	Lou Morton	United States
My Wonderful Life	Calleen Koh	Singapore
Retirement Plan	John Kelly	Ireland
S The Wolf	Sameh Alaa	France
TV or The Disturbance on Forest Hill Road	Frederic Siegel	Switzerland
Words of Her	Charlene Xu	United States, China

=== Midnight Short Competition ===
English title	Director(s)	Production country
The Beguiling	ishkwaazhe Shane McSauby	United States
Familiar	Marco Novoa	France
Last Call	Winnie Cheung	United States, Australia, Hong Kong
Lurk	Mairin Hart, Josh Wallace Kerrigan	United States
Stomach Bug	Matty Crawford	United Kingdom
Video Barn	Bianca Poletti	United States
Whitch	Hoku Uchiyama	United States

=== Texas Short Competition ===
English title	Director(s)	Production country
An Ongoing List of Things Found in the Library Book Drop, Usually Being Used as Bookmarks	Kayla Abuda Galang	United States
Good Time Charlie	David Black	United States
Harvester	Charlie Schwan	United States
Neuro	Wes Ellis	United States
Newbies	Kimiko Matsuda-Lawrence, Megan Trufant Tillman	United States
Randy As Himself	Margaret Miller	United States
Red Sands	Romina Cenisio	United States
Sweetbriar	Danny Rivera	United States

== Television ==
=== TV Premiere ===
English title	Created by	Production country
#1 Happy Family USA	Ramy Youssef, Pam Brady	United States
Government Cheese	Paul Hunter, Aeysha Carr	United States
Happy Face	Jennifer Cacicio	United States
Spy High	Jody McVeigh-Schultz	United States
The Studio	Seth Rogen, Evan Goldberg	United States
The Yogurt Shop Murders	Margaret Brown	United States

=== TV Spotlight ===
English title	Created by	Production country
Dates in Real Life	Jakob Rørvik	Norway
Dui Shaw	Nuhash Humayun	Bangladesh
Mix Tape	Lucy Gaffy	Ireland, Australia, Canada
Push	Luisa Hardenberg	Germany

=== Independent TV Competition ===
English title	Created by	Production country
Bulldozer	Joanna Leeds	United States
Cigarettes	Sarah Mokh	United States
Denim	Tedra Wilson	United States
F-ckUps Anonymous	Joe Tierney	United States
Mr. Corruption	Simeon Hu, Stephen Law	United States
R&R	JJ Herz	United States
Stars Diner	Mary Neely, Fidel Ruiz-Healy, Tyler Walker	United States

== Venues ==
Films and shows at SXSW were screened at seven venues:

- Paramount Theatre
- Zach Theatre
- Hyatt Regency Austin
- Rollins Theatre at The Long Center
- Alamo Drafthouse Lamar
- Violet Crown Cinema
- AFS Cinema (satellite venue)
