= Michael Strassner =

American actor and comedian (born 1989)

- Born: Michael David Strassner; August 18, 1989 (age 37)
- Education: University of Maryland
- Occupations: Actor; comedian; screenwriter
- Years active: 2014–present

Michael David Strassner (born August 18, 1989) is an American actor and comedian. He starred in The Baltimorons (2025), which he co-wrote with Jay Duplass.

== Early life ==
Strassner grew up in the Baltimore neighborhoods of Hampden and Roland Park. His interest in comedy and performing began at early age; when he was four, he dressed up as Mrs. Doubtfire after seeing the Robin Williams film. He attended the Loyola Blakefield college preparatory school, where he participated in the performing arts program. He also began drinking when he was fifteen years old. After one year as a business major at East Carolina University, he transferred to the University of Maryland, College Park, graduating with a degree in theater in 2011.

== Career ==
After graduating from college, Strassner moved to Los Angeles to pursue a comedy career. His early credits included small roles on the television series Parks and Recreation (as Ron Swanson's brother), Black-ish, and Modern Family. While performing with the Groundlings improvisational group, he was close getting to a job on Saturday Night Live, auditioning in person in New York, but was ultimately passed over for his friend Heidi Gardner. He also supported himself by working as a lacrosse coach, swim instructor, and substitute teacher.

In 2018, after the Groundlings fired him as a result of his drinking, Strassner attempted suicide. The next day, he entered a twelve-step program to get sober. After rediscovering his ability to be funny without alcohol, he returned to the comedy scene. In 2019, he created the web series Johnno and Michael Try with his friend Johnno Wilson. His later television credits included small roles on Young Rock (as Jerry Lawler) and English Teacher.

Strassner gained attention for his starring role in the film The Baltimorons, which he co-wrote with director Jay Duplass. The writing partnership began when Strassner reached out to Duplass during the COVID-19 pandemic after the director followed him on social media. Based loosely on his own experiences, Strassner played Cliff Cashin, an improv comedian and recovering alcoholic. Shot on a low budget in locations around Baltimore, the film won the Audience Award for Narrative Spotlight on its premiere at the 2025 South by Southwest Film & TV Festival. Reviews were positive and included praise for the chemistry between Strassner and his co-star Liz Larsen.

== Filmography ==
=== Film ===
Year	Title	Role	Notes
2015	Fantasy Life	Guy 1	TV film
2017	SexDotCom	Interviewee	
2017	How to Be a Slut in America		
2018	Grandmother's Gold	Eddie	
2019	Web Series: The Movie	Jeremy Mann	
2020	Good Luck With Everything	Paul	
2021	Bigfoot Famous	Les Gordon	
2021	A Spy Movie	Agent Michael	
2023	This Time		
2025	The Baltimorons	Cliff	Also co-writer
2025	A Very Merry Breakup	Hiking Guy	
2026	The Musical	Carson	

=== Television ===
Year	Title	Role	Notes
2015	Parks and Recreation	Vaughn Swanson	2 episodes
2016	The Gay and Wondrous Life of Caleb Gallo	Mike Wake	2 episodes
2016	Life in Pieces	Head Wound Guy	Episode: "Receptionist Pot Voting Cramp"
2016–2017	WingWoman	Jim	2 episodes
2017	Game Shakers	Rodney	Episode: "Air TnP"
2017	Black-ish	Gym Teacher	Episode: "Public Fool"
2018–2019	Modern Family	Ike	2 episodes
2019	Johnno and Michael Try	Michael	Main role; also co-director
2022	Young Rock	Jerry Lawler	3 episodes
2024	English Teacher	Mitch	Episode: "Convention"
