= List of awards and nominations received by Alessandro Nivola =

Alessandro Nivola awards and nominations
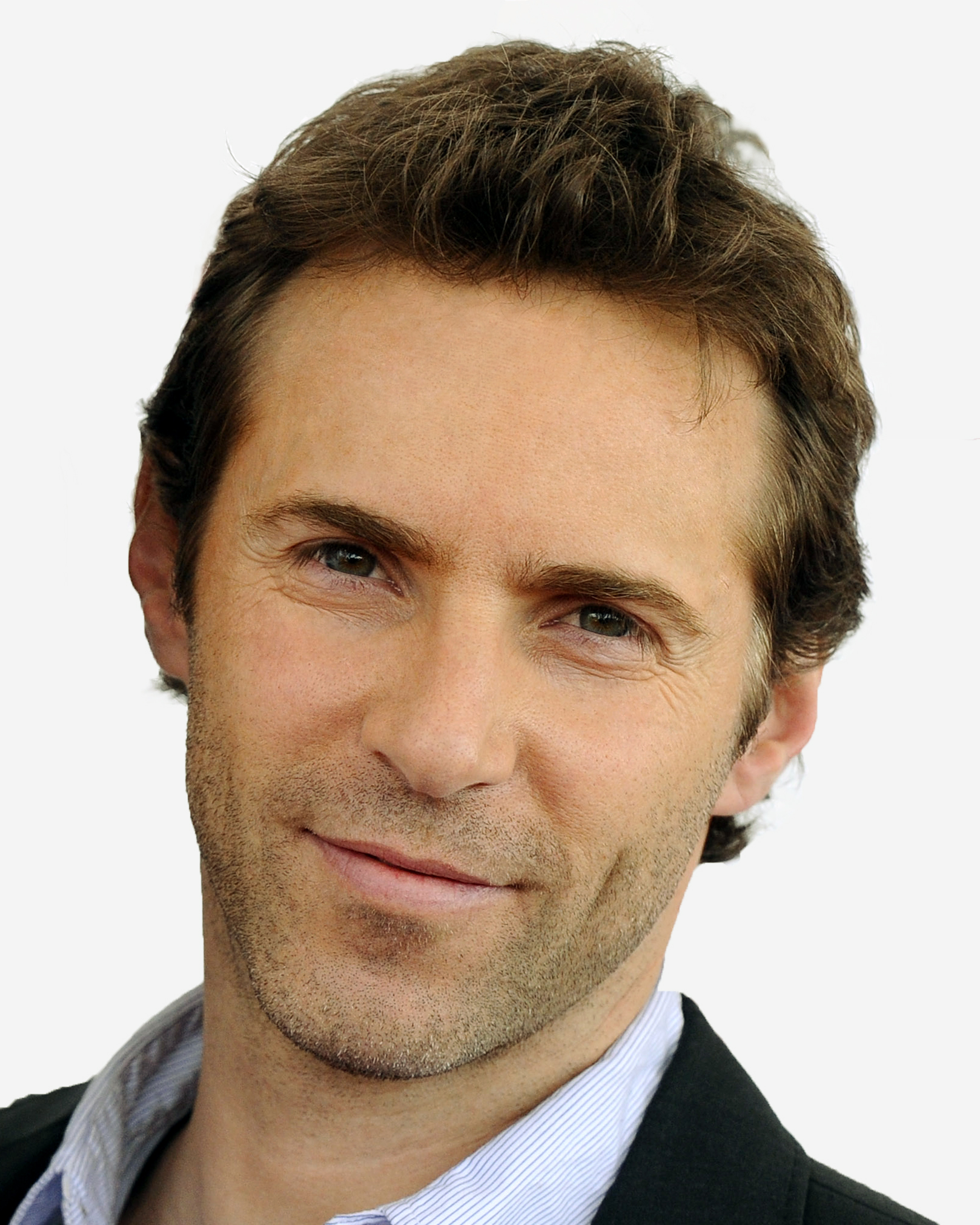
- Nivola at the 28th Independent Spirit Awards
Awards and nominations
Award	Wins	Nominations

Totals (Note: Certain award groups do not simply award one winner. They acknowledge several different recipients, have runners-up, and have third place. Since this is a specific recognition and is different from losing an award, runner-up mentions are considered wins in this award tally. For simplification and to avoid errors, each award in this list has been presumed to have had a prior nomination.)
- Wins: 8
- Nominations: 15

This is a list of awards and nominations received by American actor and producer Alessandro Nivola.

== Awards and nominations ==
=== Black Film Critics Circle Awards ===
Year	Nominated work	Category	Result	Ref.
2014	Selma	Best Ensemble	Won	

=== Blockbuster Entertainment Awards ===
Year	Nominated work	Category	Result	Ref.
1998	Face/Off	Favorite Supporting Actor – Action/Adventure	Nominated	

=== British Independent Film Awards ===
Year	Nominated work	Category	Result	Ref.
2018	Disobedience	Best Supporting Actor	Won	

=== Central Ohio Film Critics Association ===
Year	Nominated work	Category	Result	Ref.
2014	American Hustle	Best Ensemble	Won	

=== Drama Desk Award ===
Year	Nominated work	Category	Result	Ref.
1995	A Month in the Country	Outstanding Featured Actor in a Play	Nominated	

=== Georgia Film Critics Association ===
Year	Nominated work	Category	Result	Ref.
2015	Selma	Best Ensemble	Nominated	

=== Gold Derby Awards ===
Year	Nominated work	Category	Result	Ref.
2014	American Hustle	Ensemble Cast	Won	

=== Independent Spirit Awards ===
Year	Nominated work	Category	Result	Ref.
2004	Laurel Canyon	Best Supporting Male	Nominated	

=== New York Film Critics Online ===
Year	Nominated work	Category	Result	Ref.
2013	American Hustle	Best Ensemble	Won	

=== Provincetown International Film Festival ===
Year	Nominated work	Category	Result	Ref.
2009	Himself	Excellence in Acting	Won	

=== San Diego Film Critics Society ===
Year	Nominated work	Category	Result	Ref.
2014	Selma	Best Ensemble	Nominated	

=== San Diego International Film Festival ===
Year	Nominated work	Category	Result	Ref.
2024	Lifetime Achievement	Cinema Vanguard Award	Awarded	

=== Screen Actors Guild Award ===
Year	Nominated work	Category	Result	Ref.
2014	American Hustle	Outstanding Performance by a Cast in a Motion Picture	Won	

=== Seattle Film Critics Awards ===
Year	Nominated work	Category	Result	Ref.
2014	American Hustle	Best Ensemble Cast	Won	

=== Tony Award ===
Year	Nominated work	Category	Result	Ref.
2015	The Elephant Man	Best Featured Actor in a Play	Nominated	

=== Tribeca Film Festival ===
Year	Nominated work	Category	Result	Ref.
2017	One Percent More Humid	Best Actor in a U.S. Narrative Feature	Won	

=== Washington D.C. Area Film Critics Association ===
Year	Nominated work	Category	Result	Ref.
2014	Selma	Best Ensemble	Nominated	
