= Rich Girl =

Rich Girl(s) may refer to:

== Music ==
- RichGirl, an American R&B girl group
- Rich Girls (mixtape), a mixtape by rap duo Shwayze, 2008
- Rich Girl (album), an album by Angie Stone, 2012
- "Rich Girl" (Hall & Oates song), 1977
- "Rich Girl", a song by Louchie Lou & Michie One from their album II Be Free, 1993
- "Rich Girl" (Gwen Stefani song), 2004
- "Rich Girls" (song), a song by Down With Webster on their album Time to Win, Vol. 1, 2009
- "Rich Girl", a song by Soulja Boy from the album The DeAndre Way, 2010
- "Rich Girls", a song by Fitz and the Tantrums from the album Pickin' Up the Pieces, 2010

== Other ==
- Rich Girl (film), a 1991 film
- Rich Girls, a 2003 television series
- Rich Girl (play), a 2013 play by Victoria Stewart
