= Baby Doe (film) =

2025 American documentary film

- Theatrical release poster
- Directed by: Jessica Earnshaw
- Produced by: Holly Meehl Chapman; Jessica Earnshaw
- Cinematography: Jessica Earnshaw; Emily Thomas
- Edited by: George O'Donnell; Leah Boatright
- Music by: Gil Talmi
- Production companies: Impact Partners; Sweet Creatures; Lunamax Films
- Distributed by: Fourth Act Film; Twin Seas Media
- Release dates: March 7, 2025 (SXSW); July 10, 2026 (United States)
- Running time: 100 minutes
- Country: United States
- Language: English

Baby Doe is a 2025 American documentary film, directed and produced by Jessica Earnshaw. It follows Gail Ritchey as her life becomes shattered when DNA evidence links her to the death of her child thirty years prior. Sarah Paulson serves as an executive producer.

It had its world premiere at the 2025 South by Southwest Film & TV Festival on March 7, 2025. It was released on July 10, 2026 by Fourth Act Film.

== Premise ==
Gail Ritchey's life becomes shattered when DNA evidence links her to death of her child thirty years prior, whom she gave birth to alone in the woods.

== Production ==
Jessica Earnshaw became interested in making a documentary revolving around pregnancy denial, after reading an article about Emile Weaver. The film received support from Chicken & Egg Films, and InMaat Foundation. In August 2025, Sarah Paulson joined the project as an executive producer.

== Release ==
It had its world premiere at the 2025 South by Southwest Film & TV Festival on March 7, 2025. It is scheduled to be released on July 10, 2026, by Fourth Act Film and Twin Seas Media.

== Reception ==
On the review aggregator website Rotten Tomatoes, 92% of 12 critics' reviews are positive, with an average rating of 8.2/10.
