= Bunny (2025 film) =

2025 American comedy-drama film

- Theatrical release poster
- Directed by: Ben Jacobson
- Screenplay by: Mo Stark; Ben Jacobson; Stefan Marolachakis
- Produced by: Sarah Sarandos; Scott Dougan; Mo Stark; Stefan Marolachakis; Ben Jacobson
- Starring: Mo Stark; Ben Jacobson; Liza Colby; Tony Drazan; Linda Rong Mei Chen; Eric Roth; Richard Price; Henry Czerny
- Cinematography: Jackson Hunt
- Edited by: James LeSage
- Music by: Hamilton Leithauser
- Production companies: Sarah Sarandos Productions; Pragma; Free Association
- Distributed by: Vertical
- Release dates: March 8, 2025 (SXSW); November 14, 2025 (United States)
- Running time: 90 minutes
- Country: United States
- Language: English

Bunny is a 2025 American comedy-drama film directed by Ben Jacobson in his directorial debut, from a screenplay by Jacobson, Mo Stark and Stefan Marolachakis. The film was Produced By Sarah Sarandos. It stars Stark, Jacobson, Liza Colby, Tony Drazan, Linda Rong Mei Chen, Eric Roth, Richard Price and Henry Czerny.

It had its world premiere at the 2025 South by Southwest Film & TV Festival on March 8, 2025, and was theatrically released on November 14, 2025, by Vertical and licensed and released by Netflix on February 13, 2026.

== Premise ==
Over one day and night, Bunny and Dino scheme with a crew of neighbors to cover up a dead body.

== Cast ==
- Mo Stark as Bunny
- Ben Jacobson as Dino
- Liza Colby as Bobbie
- Tony Drazan as Loren
- Linda Rong Mei Chen as Linda
- Eric Roth as Franklin
- Richard Price as Ian
- Henry Czerny as Rabbi
- Eleonore Hendricks as Daphne
- Genevieve Hudson-Price as Happy Chana
- Kia Warren as Ciel
- Liz Caribel Sierra as Officer Nadov
- Ajay Naidu as Officer Cellestino
- Michael Abbott Jr. as Officer Belle

== Release ==
It had its world premiere at the 2025 South by Southwest Film & TV Festival on March 8, 2025. It also screened at the 2025 Tribeca Festival. In September 2025, Vertical acquired distribution rights to the film and released it on November 14, 2025.
