= American Sons (2025 film) =

- Film poster
- Directed by: Andrew James Gonzales
- Produced by: Andrew James Gonzales; Laura Varela
- Cinematography: Andrew James Gonzales
- Edited by: Andrew James Gonzales
- Music by: Stew Jackson; Dan Brown
- Release date: March 8, 2025 (SXSW)
- Running time: 59 minutes
- Country: United States
- Language: English

American Sons is a 2025 American documentary film directed by Andrew James Gonzales. It premiered at the South by Southwest Film & TV Festival on March 8, 2025, and was screened days later at the Houston Latino Film Festival on March 14. The film is produced by Gonzales and Laura Varela, both of whom are from San Antonio, Texas.

The film cost $600,000 to make. It received funding from Latino Public Broadcasting, Black Public Media, Bexar County and the City of San Antonio Department of Arts and Culture.

== Synopsis ==
The film follows a group of American Marines a decade after their deployment to Afghanistan. It specifically depicts their struggle with PTSD and their grief over the loss of their friend Jorge "JV" Villarreal who, at the age of 22, was killed in October 2010 while on patrol in Afghanistan. Villareal's first-person video diaries figure prominently in the documentary.
