= Brief Somebodies =

- Directed by: Andy Reid
- Screenplay by: Andy Reid
- Produced by: Alessandra Sconza
- Starring: Aldrin Bundoc; Matt O'Connor; Noor Kaur Dhandha
- Cinematography: Colin Cameron
- Edited by: Arielle Skolnik
- Release date: March 8, 2025 (SXSW)
- Running time: 14 minutes
- Country: Canada
- Language: English

Brief Somebodies is a Canadian short drama film, directed by Andy Reid and released in 2025. The film stars Aldrin Bundoc and Matt O'Connor as Joel and Calvin, actors who are filming a scene in which Calvin's character sexually assaults Joel's character, only for the two men to develop an emotional connection outside of the filming process.

The cast also includes Noor Kaur Dhanda as intimacy coordinator Ria, as well as Karim Butt and Reid himself in supporting roles.

The film premiered at the 2025 South by Southwest Film & TV Festival, where Reid won the Redbreast Unhidden Award. It had its Canadian premiere in the National Short Film Competition at the 2025 Festival du nouveau cinéma.

It was screened at the Inside Out Film and Video Festival in 2026, winning the juried award for Best Canadian Short Film.
