= Alessandro Nivola =

American actor (born 1972)

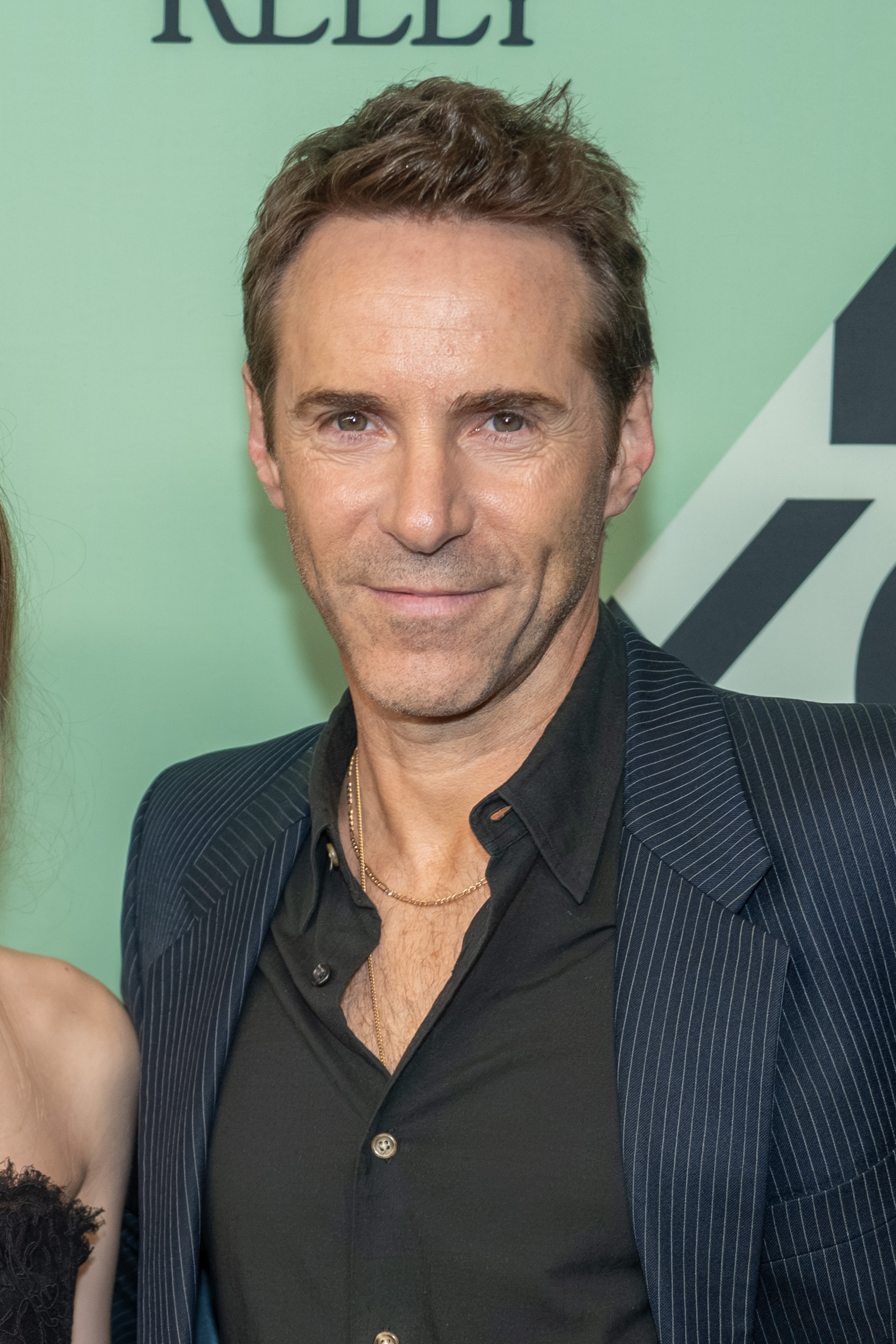
- Nivola in 2025
- Born: Alessandro Antine Nivola; June 28, 1972 (age 54); Boston, Massachusetts, U.S.
- Citizenship: United States; United Kingdom
- Education: Yale University (BA)
- Occupation: Actor
- Years active: 1993–present
- Spouse: Emily Mortimer (m. 2003)
- Children: 2, including Sam
- Relatives: Costantino Nivola (paternal grandfather)
- Awards: Full list

Alessandro Antine Nivola (born June 28, 1972) is an American actor. His work includes both screen and stage, and his accolades include a Screen Actors Guild Award, in addition to nominations for a Tony Award and an Independent Spirit Award.

Nivola made his acting film debut in Face/Off (1997) and has since acted in films such as Mansfield Park (1999), Jurassic Park III (2001), Laurel Canyon (2002), Junebug (2005), Coco Before Chanel (2009), Ginger & Rosa (2012), American Hustle (2013), Selma (2014), A Most Violent Year (2014), Disobedience (2017), You Were Never Really Here (2017), The Art of Self-Defense (2019), The Many Saints of Newark (2021), Boston Strangler (2023), The Room Next Door (2024), and The Brutalist (2024). He portrayed Aleksei Sytsevich / Rhino in the Marvel superhero film Kraven the Hunter (2024).

He founded the production company King Bee Productions with his wife Emily Mortimer in 2013. On television, he acted in and produced the HBO comedy Doll & Em (2015), and has portrayed Mark Madoff in the HBO television film The Wizard of Lies (2017), Mr. Dean in the FX / BBC One series Black Narcissus (2020), Bert Schneider in the Apple TV+ thriller miniseries The Big Cigar (2024) and Calvin Klein in the FX/Hulu drama miniseries Love Story.

On stage, he made his Broadway debut in the play A Month in the Country (1995) for which he was nominated for the Drama Desk Award for Outstanding Featured Actor in a Play. He returned to Broadway acting in the revivals of Terence Rattigan's The Winslow Boy (2012), and Bernard Pomerance's The Elephant Man earning a Tony Award for Best Featured Actor in a Play nomination for the latter.

== Early life and education ==
Italian-American, Nivola was born in Boston, Massachusetts, to Virginia (née Davis), an artist, and Pietro Salvatore Nivola, a professor of political science and a senior fellow at the Brookings Institution. Nivola's paternal grandfather was the Italian (Sardinian) sculptor Costantino Nivola, and his paternal grandmother, Ruth Guggenheim, was a Jewish refugee from Germany.

The elder of two boys (his brother, Adrian Nivola, a painter, is five years younger), Alessandro Nivola's childhood was divided between Boston; Burlington, Vermont, where he attended the Mater Christi School (a ministry of the Sisters of Mercy); and Washington, D.C. He later attended Phillips Exeter Academy and Yale University.

== Career ==
Nivola graduated from Yale University with a BA in English in 1994. A year later he made his Broadway debut opposite Helen Mirren in A Month in the Country, earning a Drama Desk Award nomination. That year he also starred opposite Gwyneth Paltrow in the 1995 Williamstown Theater Festival production of Shakespeare's As You Like It. Shortly after that came his breakthrough performance in John Woo's feature film Face/Off (1997), playing Nicolas Cage's brother Pollux Troy.

In the ensuing years he has starred in many films, including Mansfield Park (1999), Love's Labour's Lost (2000), Jurassic Park III (2001), Laurel Canyon (2002), Junebug (2005), Goal! 1 & 2 (2005, 2007), Coco Before Chanel (2009), Ginger & Rosa (2012), American Hustle (2013), A Most Violent Year (2014), Selma (2014), The Neon Demon (2016), One Percent More Humid (2017), You Were Never Really Here (2017), Disobedience (2017), The Art of Self Defense (2019), and The Red Sea Diving Resort (2019). He played Dickie Moltisanti, the lead role in The Many Saints of Newark, David Chase's feature film prequel to his television series The Sopranos. In 2022, he appeared in David O. Russell's Amsterdam opposite Christian Bale and Margot Robbie, as well as the comedy feature Spin Me Round opposite Alison Brie and Aubrey Plaza.

To prepare for playing an Orthodox rabbi in Disobedience, Nivola spent four to five months getting to know members of Brooklyn’s Orthodox community and attended Shabbat dinners with a Hasidic family in Crown Heights.

Nivola worked frequently in television, starring opposite Robert De Niro in Barry Levinson's Madoff family biopic The Wizard of Lies (2017), as well as the TNT miniseries The Company (2007), the UK Channel 4 series Chimerica (2019), and the three-part BBC miniseries Black Narcissus, broadcast 27, 28, and 29 December 2020.

Onstage, he starred off-Broadway in a revival of the Sam Shepard play A Lie of the Mind (2010), with Laurie Metcalf and directed by Ethan Hawke. On Broadway, he starred in 2013 in The Winslow Boy and in 2014 in the revival The Elephant Man opposite Bradley Cooper (for which he earned a Tony Award nomination). In 2013, Nivola established King Bee Productions with his wife Emily Mortimer. The company produced two seasons of the half-hour comedy Doll & Em for HBO and BSkyB. He also produced To Dust, starring Matthew Broderick. It won the Audience Award at the 2018 Tribeca Film Festival and was nominated for a 2020 Independent Spirit Award.

In 2024, Nivola appeared in Sony's Kraven the Hunter film, in which he played Spider-Man antagonist The Rhino.

== Personal life ==
Nivola married British actress Emily Mortimer in Buckinghamshire in January 2003. The couple have a son, Sam, born 26 September 2003, and daughter born 2010, and live in Boerum Hill, Brooklyn. Nivola became a British citizen the same day Mortimer became an American citizen.

== Acting credits ==
=== Film ===
Year	Title	Role	Notes	Ref.
1997	Face/Off	Pollux Troy		
1997	Inventing the Abbotts	Peter Vanlaningham		
1998	I Want You	Martin		
1998	Reach the Rock	Robin		
1999	Best Laid Plans	Nick		
1999	Mansfield Park	Henry Crawford		
2000	Love's Labour's Lost	King Ferdinand of Navarre		
2000	Timecode	Joey Z		
2001	Jurassic Park III	Billy Brennan		
2002	Imprint	Matt	Short film	
2002	Laurel Canyon	Ian McKnight		
2003	Carolina	Albert Morris		
2004	The Clearing	Tim Hayes		
2005	Junebug	George Johnsten		
2005	The Sisters	Andrew Prior		
2005	Turning Green	Bill the Bookie		
2005	Goal!	Gavin Harris		
2006	The Darwin Awards	Ad Exec		
2007	Grace Is Gone	John Phillips		
2007	Goal II: Living the Dream	Gavin Harris		
2007	The Girl in the Park	Chris		
2008	The Eye	Dr. Paul Faulkner		
2008	Five Dollars a Day	Ritchie Flynn Parker		
2008	Who Do You Love?	Leonard Chess		
2009	Coco Before Chanel	Arthur 'Boy' Capel		
2010	Howl	Luther Nichols		
2010	Janie Jones	Ethan Brand		
2012	Ginger & Rosa	Roland		
2013	American Hustle	Anthony Amado		
2014	Devil's Knot	Terry Hobbs		
2014	Selma	John Doar		
2014	A Most Violent Year	Peter Forente		
2016	The Neon Demon	Robert Sarno		
2017	One Percent More Humid	Gerald		
2017	You Were Never Really Here	Governor Williams		
2017	Disobedience	Rabbi Dovid Kuperman		
2018	Weightless	Joel		
2018	To Dust	—N/a	Producer	
2019	The Art of Self-Defense	Sensei		
2019	The Red Sea Diving Resort	Sammy Navon		
2021	With/In: Volume 2		Segment: "Neighborhood Watch"	
2021	The Many Saints of Newark	Dickie Moltisanti		
2022	Spin Me Round	Nick Martucci		
2022	Amsterdam	Detective Hiltz		
2023	Boston Strangler	Detective Conley		
2023	Wildcat	John Selby		
2024	The Brutalist	Attila		
2024	The Room Next Door	Policeman		
2024	Kraven the Hunter	Aleksei Sytsevich / Rhino		
2025	Fantasy Life	David		
2025	Downton Abbey: The Grand Finale	Gus Sambrook		
2027	The 99'ers	Tony DiCicco	Filming	

=== Television ===
Year	Title	Role	Notes	Ref.
1996	Remember WENN	Paul Rice	Episode: "Valentino Speaks!"	
1996	The Ring	Noel	Television film	
1998	The Almost Perfect Bank Robbery	Doug	Television film	
2007	The Company	Leo Kritzky	Miniseries	
2015	Doll & Em	John	4 episodes; also producer	
2017	The Wizard of Lies	Mark Madoff	Television film	
2019	Chimerica	Lee Berger	4 episodes	
2020	Black Narcissus	Mr. Dean	Miniseries	
2022	The Last Movie Stars	Richard Brooks / Robert Redford (voice)	4 episodes	
2024	The Big Cigar	Bert Schneider	Main role	
2026	Love Story	Calvin Klein	Recurring	

Key
†	Denotes television productions that have not yet been released

=== Theater ===
Theater credits
Year	Title	Role	Venue	Ref.
1993	"Master Harold"...and the Boys	Hally	Intiman Theatre Festival, Seattle	
1995	A Month in the Country	Beliaev	Criterion Center Stage Right, Broadway	
1999	As You Like It	Orlando	Williamstown Theatre Festival	
2010	A Lie of the Mind	Jake	Acorn Theater, Off-Broadway	
2012	The Elephant Man	Frederick Treves	Williamstown Theatre Festival	
2013	The Winslow Boy	Sir Robert Morton	American Airlines Theatre, Broadway	
2014	The Elephant Man	Frederick Treves	Booth Theatre, Broadway	
2015	The Elephant Man	Frederick Treves	Theatre Royal Haymarket, West End	

== Awards and nominations ==
He has won a British Independent Film Award (BIFA), and the Best Actor Award at the 2017 Tribeca Film Festival among others.
