= Matthew Shear =

American actor

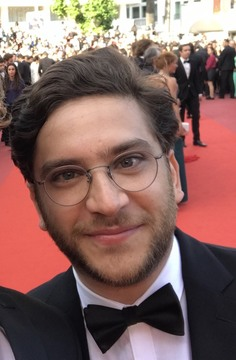
- Shear at the 2017 Cannes Film Festival
- Born: October 10, 1984 (age 41); New York City
- Education: St. John's College—Annapolis
- Occupation: Actor
- Years active: 2009 – present

Matthew Louis Shear (born October 10, 1984) is an American actor. He is known for playing the role of Tony in Noah Baumbach's Mistress America, opposite Greta Gerwig and Lola Kirke.

He played Detective Lucius Isaacson on TNT's The Alienist, based on the novel of the same name by Caleb Carr. The historical drama premiered January 22, 2018 and was nominated for Outstanding Limited Series at the 70th Primetime Emmy Awards and Best Action-Thriller Television Series at the 44th Saturn Awards.

== Life and career ==
Shear was born in New York City. He is Jewish and grew up in a Reform Jewish home. graduated from St. John's College—Annapolis in 2008. His film career began the following year with a bit part in director Ang Lee's comedy-drama Taking Woodstock. He starred opposite Zosia Mamet in the 2017 Tribeca Film Festival feature, The Boy Downstairs, released to theatres on February 16, 2018, by FilmRise. He also appeared in Noah Baumbach's The Meyerowitz Stories (New and Selected) and Marriage Story.

His prior television appearances include the CBS police procedural drama NYC 22, the Hulu supernatural comedy series Deadbeat and the Peabody Award-winning web series Horace and Pete.

== Filmography ==
Film
Year	Title	Role	Notes
2009	Taking Woodstock	Earthlight Player	
2009	Red Light, Green Card	Jordan	Short film
2009	Milked	Sam	Short film
2010	Beware the Gonzo	Dave Melnick	
2012	Hunters	Randy	Animated short film
2014	Don Peyote	Zebra Shaman	
2014	While We're Young	Benny	
2015	Mistress America	Tony	
2015	The Statistical Analysis of Your Failing Relationship	Ben	Short film
2015	Marcus & the Dead Pet	Marcus	Short film
2016	Delinquent	Mr. Simon	
2016	Interior Teresa	Father Jake	Short film
2017	The Boy Downstairs	Ben	
2017	The Meyerowitz Stories (New and Selected)	Gabe	
2019	Cubby	Lars	
2019	Marriage Story	Terry	
2021	Old	Sidney	
2024	Between the Temples	Nat	
2025	Fantasy Life	Sam Stein	Also writer and director

Television
Year	Title	Role	Notes
2012	NYC 22	College boy driver	Episode: "Crossing the Rubicon"
2016	Horace and Pete	Zach	Episode #1.2
2016	Deadbeat	Elijah	Episode: "Am-ish"
2018–20	The Alienist	Detective Lucius Isaacson	18 episodes
2021	Love Life	Ben	Episode: "Epilogue"
