= It Ends =

2025 road horror thriller film

- Theatrical release poster
- Directed by: Alexander Ullom
- Written by: Alexander Ullom
- Produced by: Carrie Carusone; Evan Barber
- Starring: Phinehas Yoon; Akira Jackson; Noah Toth; Mitchell Cole
- Cinematography: Evan Draper; Jazleana Jones
- Edited by: Alexander Ullom
- Music by: Matthew Robert Cooper
- Production companies: Growing Up Dead Films; Snoot Entertainment; Above .330; Aymara Films; Please Hold Pictures
- Distributed by: Neon
- Release dates: March 7, 2025 (SXSW); August 21, 2026 (United States)
- Running time: 89 minutes
- Country: United States
- Language: English
- Budget: $80,000
- Box office: $1.3 million

It Ends is a 2025 American road horror thriller film written, directed, and edited by Alexander Ullom, in his directorial debut and starring Phinehas Yoon, Akira Jackson, Noah Toth, and Mitchell Cole. It follows a group of friends who go on a late-night drive and turn onto a two-lane highway which appears to go on indefinitely.

It Ends had its premiere at the 2025 South by Southwest Film & TV Festival. It was available as a digital rental for a limited period starting on December 10, 2025, via Letterboxd Video Store. The film was later acquired and theatrically released by Neon in the United States on August 21, 2026. It received positive reviews from critics.

== Plot ==
Recent graduates James, Day, and Fisher are picked up by their friend Tyler, whom they have not seen in a year. Tyler drives them down a forested road while James and Fisher debate which animals would win in a fight. Struggling to find a turnoff, Tyler turns the car around, and they find the road inexplicably blocked by a thick wall of trees. After Tyler gets out to investigate, a horde of frantic people emerge from the forest, swarm the car, and plead for entry. The four manage to drive off down the road, but Fisher's arm is clawed in the attack. When they stop to tend to Fisher's wound, the car is swarmed again. As they shakily make sense of their predicament, they notice the road seems endless.

After driving through the night, James notices the fuel meter hasn't changed. Thinking the engine shouldn't be running, Tyler tells the others not to turn off the ignition. After a full day of driving in shifts, they realize they feel neither tired nor hungry, but Fisher's injury is still healing. They begin to theorize why they are trapped on the road; James surmises that they have died and are in some kind of Hell or purgatory, then presses the others to confess if they have done anything that would warrant divine punishment. Day admits that she attempted suicide the previous year, which shocks the others.

Using their phone timers, they deduce that they have 90 seconds after stopping before the car is attacked. Tyler explores the woods and finds that the people within them are docile. They inventory the items within Tyler's car, including a Clif Bar, which James suggests they not eat. Frustrated, Tyler and James restrain and interrogate a man in the forest for answers, but he does not respond. Later, they find an abandoned car on the opposite side of the road, missing its keys and with its odometer maxed out at 999,999 miles.

After 56,182 miles of driving, a despondent Tyler resolves to stay in the forest as the rest of the group continues. Some time later (a title card indicates “way later”), Day and Fisher adapt by taking items from abandoned vehicles to amuse themselves, sticking to a routine of similar conversations and stop breaks, and having daily screaming sessions to vent their frustration. Meanwhile, James remains determined to figure out how to escape the road. While inspecting another abandoned car, they realize that nobody is emerging from the woods anymore. James is elated, believing the change must mean something, but is frustrated when Fisher and Day are less enthusiastic.

After 835,471 miles, Day removes the keys from the ignition while the car is stopped. She and Fisher implore James to stop driving, since they have accepted that there is no escape and believe that James is torturing himself with false hope. James wrestles the keys back and desperately tries to restart the engine, which seemingly fails until he prays aloud. James drives off without Day and Fisher; the pair embrace for comfort as they cry.

At over 1,100,000 miles, it begins to rain, confusing and scaring James. After an inordinate amount of driving, he encounters dozens of abandoned cars blocking the road. Walking past them, he finally reaches the end of the road, which comprises a circle of asphalt surrounded by cars from various periods and a single sign reading "road ends." Aghast, James sits on the ground for an unknown amount of time before returning to the car, where he breaks down in tears as he finally eats the Clif Bar. He begins to scream before he enters the car and drive back down the road in the opposite direction. James finds another empty vehicle and drags a lethargic man from the side of the road into his car. As he drives, James begins to converse with the now-responsive man about which animals would win in a fight.

== Production ==
According to director Alexander Ullom, the film's initial budget of $30,000 came in equal parts from a YouTuber, a magician involved in the GameStop short squeeze, and a stranger whom Ullom encountered in the lobby of an online poker game. Post-production cost an additional $50,000. Inspiration for the film came from being shaken out of a period of major depressive disorder by a friend asking whether a gorilla or grizzly bear would win in a fight. Ullom has also cited The Backrooms as inspiration.

== Themes ==
Ullom has described It Ends as being about the uncertainty of entering adulthood and the search for meaning. He said that people of his generation increasingly lack traditional structures and milestones, such as religion, homeownership and starting a family, that historically provided a sense of direction in life.

Ullom has also described James's journey as one of accepting mortality and finding meaning in relationships rather than continuing to search for a definitive answer or destination. He said that James initially cannot accept that relationships and the people he loves are what give life meaning, contrasting him with Fisher and Day, who become content simply spending time together. In an interview with Letterboxd, Ullom similarly said that the film is ultimately about James accepting that he will die and learning to enjoy the time he has with his friends.

== Cast ==
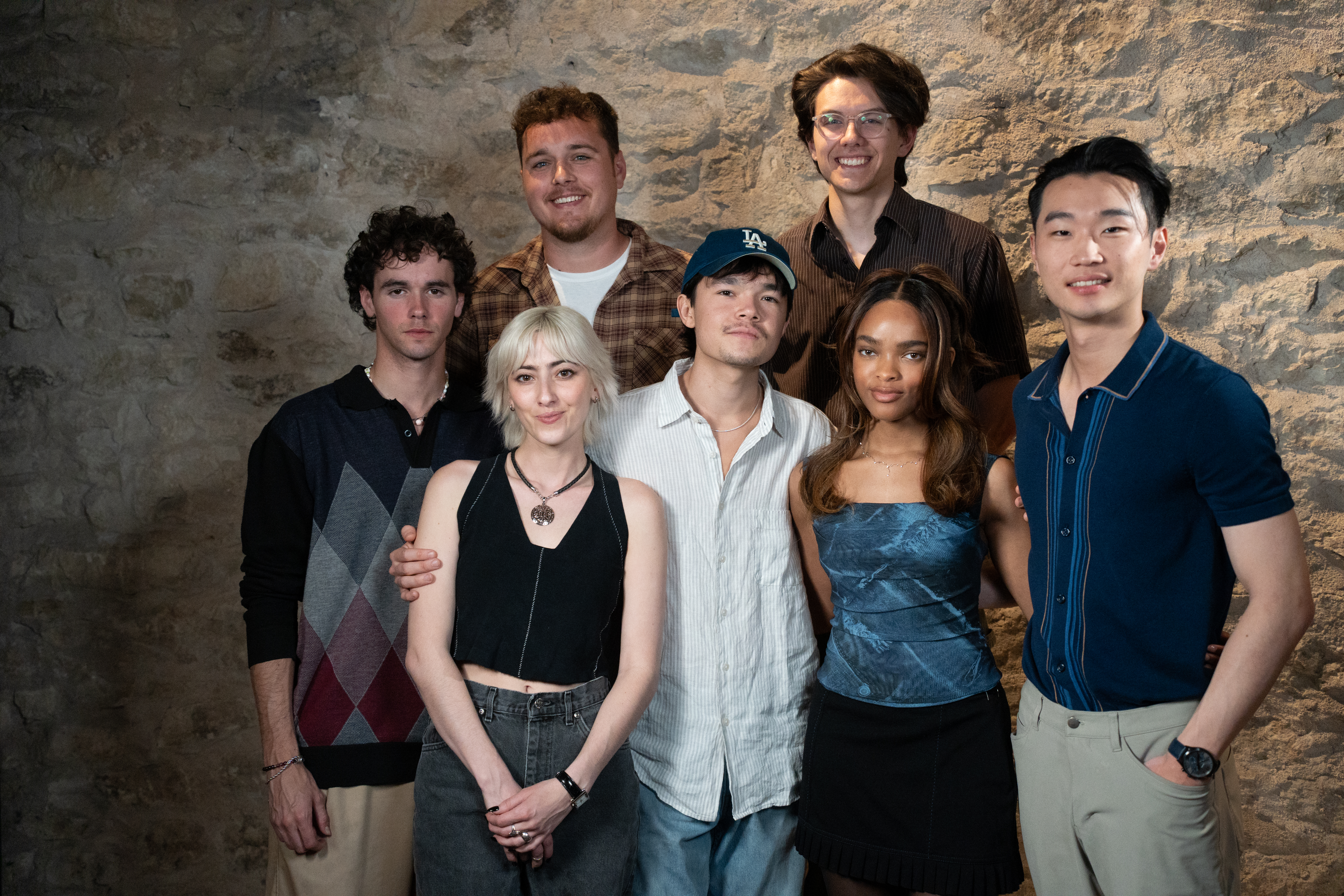
The cast and crew of It Ends at the 2025 South by Southwest Festival.

- Phinehas Yoon as James
- Akira Jackson as Day
- Noah Toth as Fisher
- Mitchell Cole as Tyler
- Jon Linstad as Interrogated Man
- Jenny Doyle as Voice of Fisher's Mom
- Ian Weir as Lost Man
- Alexander Ullom as New Passenger

== Release ==
Ullom was initially considering to post the film directly to YouTube. Instead, It Ends premiered at the South by Southwest Festival on March 7, 2025. Although the film was well-received, Ullom could not find a distributor and hopped a fence to speak to screenwriter Nicolas Curcio, who promoted the film on social media. On December 8, 2025, Letterboxd announced that the film would be one of the first exclusive premium video on demand films that would be made available to digitally rent for limited availability on its newly-announced service feature Letterboxd Video Store, a platform containing curated unreleased independent films without distribution. It was released on the platform on December 10, 2025, and expired on January 9, 2026.

Following the Letterboxd release, on December 18, Neon acquired worldwide rights to the film for a theatrical release. The film was released in the United States on August 21, 2026.

== Reception ==
On the review aggregator website Rotten Tomatoes, 93% of 132 critics' reviews are positive, with an average rating of 7.4/10. The website's consensus reads: "Smartly driven by its magnetic young ensemble and mounting sense of dread, It Ends twists a perpetual road trip into an existential nightmare." Metacritic, which uses a weighted average, assigned the film a score of 75 out of 100, based on 26 critics, indicating "generally favorable" reviews.

Siddhant Adlakha of Variety praised the film as a "brilliant" modern spin on Jean-Paul Sartre's No Exit.
