= The Boy Downstairs =

- Theatrical release poster
- Directed by: Sophie Brooks
- Written by: Sophie Brooks
- Produced by: Leon Clarance; David Brooks; Dan Clifton
- Starring: Zosia Mamet; Matthew Shear; Deirdre O'Connell; Sarah Ramos; Diana Irvine
- Cinematography: Stefan Weinberger
- Edited by: Matt Friedman
- Music by: David Buckley
- Production companies: The Boy Downstairs Productions; Cliffbrook Films; Motion Picture Capital
- Distributed by: FilmRise
- Release dates: April 23, 2017 (Tribeca Film Festival); February 16, 2018 (United States)
- Running time: 91 minutes
- Country: United States
- Language: English
- Box office: $73,988

The Boy Downstairs is a 2017 American romantic comedy-drama film written and directed by Sophie Brooks, in her feature directorial debut. The film stars Zosia Mamet, Matthew Shear, Deirdre O'Connell, Sarah Ramos and Diana Irvine. The film was released in the United States on February 16, 2018, by FilmRise.

== Plot ==
Aspiring Brooklyn writer Diana and aspiring musician Ben's first date is on a rowboat in Prospect Park, and their relationship becomes serious over a year. Ben wants a long-term, happy marriage like his parents, but Diana plans to move to London and does not want distractions or commitments. She discourages his suggestion of moving with her, and stuns Ben by ending the relationship before leaving.

After returning to Brooklyn three years later, Diana finds an apartment through Meg, a friend of her best friend Gabby. Diana learns that Ben is living in the downstairs apartment, and that he is dating Meg. She spies on Ben and Meg instead of working on her novel, annoying Meg. After Ben and Meg break up, he tells Diana that he does not want to see her as he cannot be only friends with her, and moves out of his apartment.

Ben finds Diana after a minor accident. His devoted care for her at the hospital and at her home reminds Diana of Ben's kindness and character, but when she goes to his new home to confess her love, Meg is there. Her romantic difficulties help Diana finish her novel, however. Ben awaits her at her home.

== Cast ==
- Zosia Mamet as Diana
- Matthew Shear as Ben
- Deirdre O'Connell as Amy
- Sarah Ramos as Meg
- Diana Irvine as Gabby
- Arliss Howard as Diana's Father
- Deborah Offner as Shannon
- David Wohl as Barry
- Jeff Ward as Marcus
- Theo Stockman as Eliot
- Liz Larsen as Diana
- Sabina Friedman-Seitz as Jenny
- Natalie Hall as Ivy
- Peter Oliver as Julian

== Release ==
The film premiered at the Tribeca Film Festival on April 23, 2017. On June 14, 2017, FilmRise acquired distribution rights to the film. The film was released in the United States on February 16, 2018, by FilmRise.

=== Critical reception ===
On review aggregator website Rotten Tomatoes, the film holds an approval rating of 63% based on 43 reviews, and an average rating of 5.7/10. The site's critical consensus reads, "The Boy Downstairs finds a few fresh moments in its familiar setup and benefits from Zosia Mamet's charismatic performance, both of which are enough to keep viewers interested." On Metacritic, the film has a weighted average score of 59 out of 100, based on 11 critics, indicating "mixed or average reviews".
