= Fantasy Life (film) =

2025 American comedy film

- Theatrical release poster
- Directed by: Matthew Shear
- Written by: Matthew Shear
- Produced by: Charlie Alderman; Chris Dodds; Phil Keefe; Amanda Peet; Emily McCann Lesser; David Bernon; Sam Slater
- Starring: Amanda Peet; Matthew Shear; Alessandro Nivola; Judd Hirsch; Bob Balaban; Andrea Martin; Zosia Mamet; Jessica Harper; Holland Taylor; Sheng Wang
- Cinematography: Conor Murphy
- Edited by: Ian Blume
- Music by: Christopher Bear
- Production companies: Prospect Avenue; Made by Limbo; AC3 Media
- Distributed by: Greenwich Entertainment
- Release dates: March 8, 2025 (SXSW); March 27, 2026 (United States)
- Running time: 92 minutes
- Country: United States
- Language: English
- Box office: $1 million

Fantasy Life is a 2025 American comedy film, written and directed by Matthew Shear, in his directorial debut. It stars Amanda Peet, Shear, Alessandro Nivola, Judd Hirsch, Bob Balaban, Andrea Martin, Zosia Mamet, Jessica Harper, Holland Taylor and Sheng Wang.

It had its world premiere at the 2025 South by Southwest Film & TV Festival on March 8, 2025. It was released in the United States on March 27, 2026.

== Premise ==
After being laid off, a paralegal begins babysitting his psychiatrist's granddaughters, and falls for their mother.

== Cast ==
- Amanda Peet as Dianne
- Matthew Shear as Sam
- Alessandro Nivola as David
- Judd Hirsch as Fred
- Bob Balaban as Lenny
- Andrea Martin as Helen
- Zosia Mamet as Jenny
- Jessica Harper as Toby
- Holland Taylor as Dr. Greene
- Sheng Wang as Alan
- Sophie von Haselberg as Becky

== Release ==
It had its world premiere at the 2025 South by Southwest Film & TV Festival on March 8, 2025. In May 2025, Greenwich Entertainment acquired distribution rights to the film. It was released in the United States on March 27, 2026.

== Reception ==
=== Critical response ===
On the review aggregator website Rotten Tomatoes, 82% of 71 critics' reviews are positive, with an average rating of 6.70/10. The website's consensus reads: "A sensitive romantic dramedy enriched with emotional maturity and a terrific turn from Amanda Peet, Fantasy Life is refreshingly grounded in plausible reality." Metacritic, which uses a weighted average, assigned the film a score of 72 out of 100, based on 11 critics, indicating "generally favorable" reviews.

In 2025, the jury at South by Southwest awarded Peet the Narrative Feature Competition Special Jury Award for Performance.
