= List of accolades received by Marriage Story =

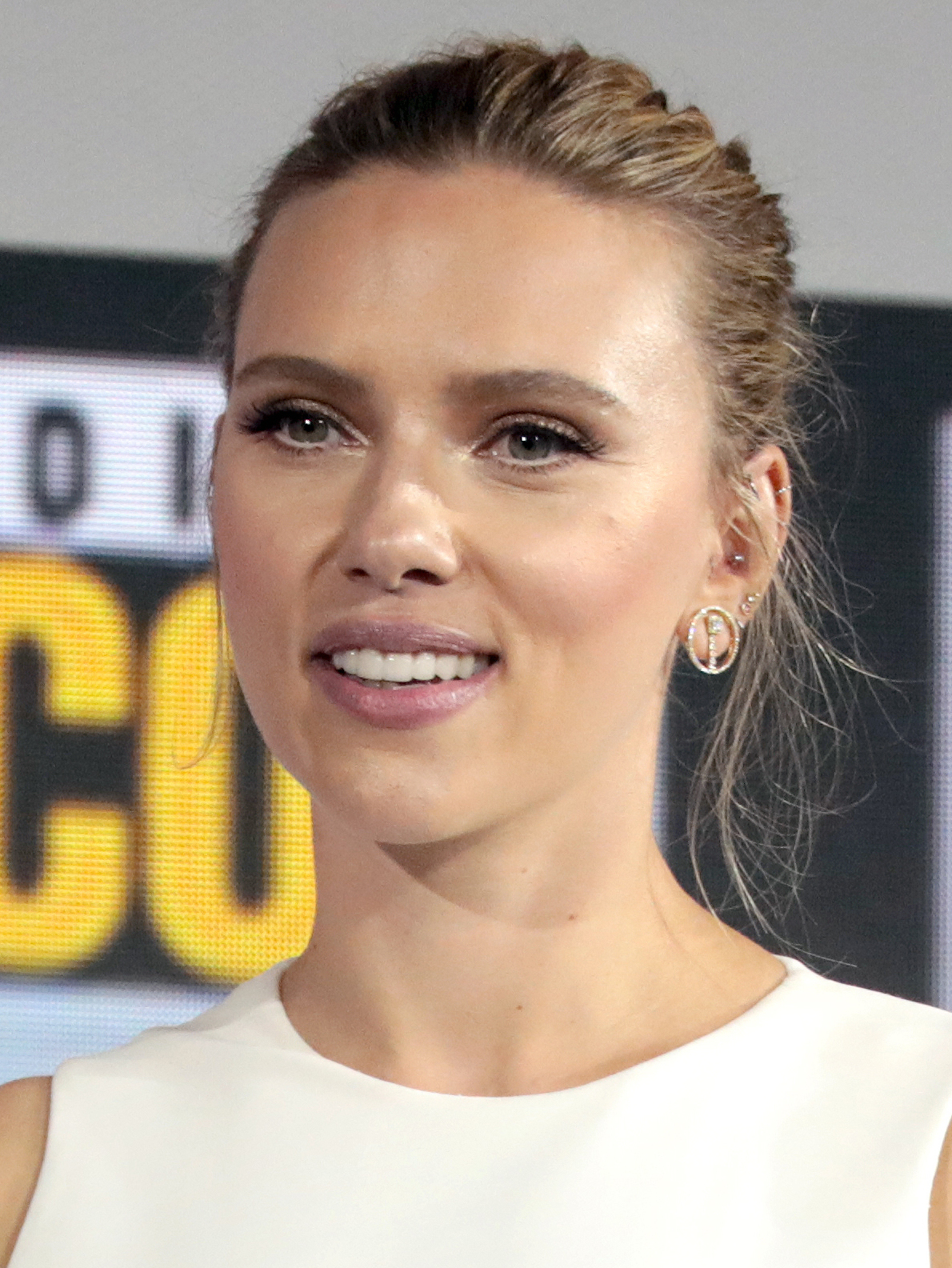
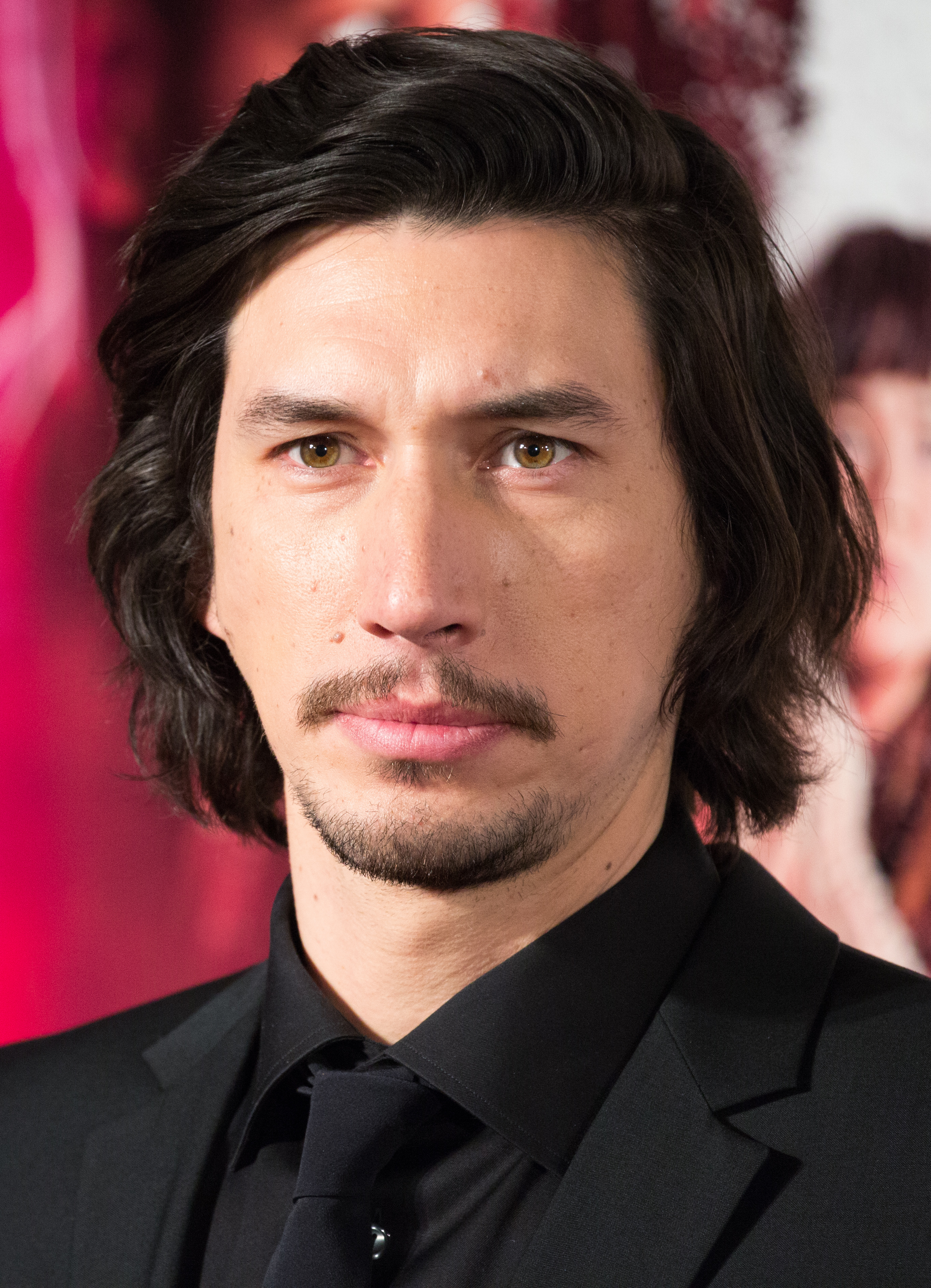
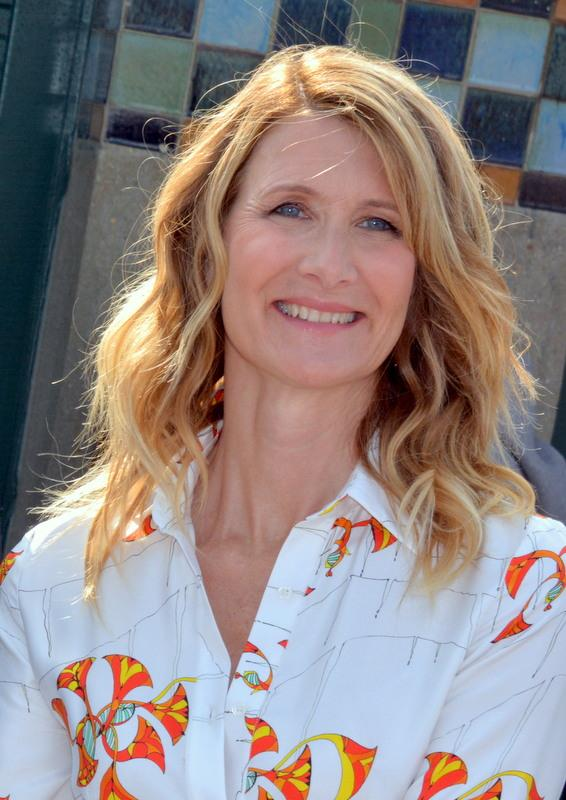
- Scarlett Johansson (left), Adam Driver (center), and Laura Dern (right) received critical acclaim for their performances in the film
Accolades
Award	Wins	Nominations
Academy Awards	1	6
British Academy Film Awards	1	5
Critics' Choice Movie Awards	1	8
Golden Globe Awards	1	6
Golden Tomato Awards	2	2
Gotham Independent Film Awards	4	4
Independent Spirit Awards	1	3
Satellite Awards	2	8
Screen Actors Guild Awards	1	3
Writers Guild of America Awards	0	1

Totals (Note: Certain award groups do not simply award one winner. They acknowledge several different recipients, have runners-up, and have third place. Since this is a specific recognition and is different from losing an award, runner-up mentions are considered wins in this award tally. For simplification and to avoid errors, each award in this list has been presumed to have had a prior nomination.)
- Wins: 55
- Nominations: 136

Marriage Story is a 2019 American comedy-drama film written, directed and produced by Noah Baumbach. The film stars Adam Driver, Scarlett Johansson, Laura Dern, Alan Alda, Ray Liotta, Azhy Robertson, Julie Hagerty, Merritt Wever, and Wallace Shawn and follows a married couple going through a coast-to-coast divorce. The film had its world premiere at the Venice Film Festival on August 29, 2019, and began a limited theatrical release on November 6, 2019, followed by digital streaming on December 6.

Marriage Story received critical acclaim, particularly for Baumbach's screenplay and direction, as well as its acting (particularly that of Johansson, Driver, and Dern), and musical score. It was chosen by the American Film Institute and the National Board of Review as one of the ten best films of the year. At the 77th Golden Globe Awards, the film received a leading six nominations, including Best Motion Picture – Drama, winning for Best Supporting Actress – Motion Picture. The film received eight nominations at the 25th Critics' Choice Awards, and three nominations at the 26th Screen Actors Guild Awards for the performances of Driver, Johansson, and Dern.

== Accolades ==
Award	Date of the ceremony	Category	Nominee(s)	Result	Ref.
AACTA Awards	January 3, 2020	Best International Actor	Adam Driver	Won	
AACTA Awards	January 3, 2020	Best International Actress	Scarlett Johansson	Nominated	
AARP's Movies for Grownups Awards	January 11, 2020	Best Picture	Marriage Story	Nominated	
AARP's Movies for Grownups Awards	January 11, 2020	Best Supporting Actress	Laura Dern	Won	
AARP's Movies for Grownups Awards	January 11, 2020	Best Director	Noah Baumbach	Nominated	
AARP's Movies for Grownups Awards	January 11, 2020	Best Screenwriter	Noah Baumbach	Won	
AARP's Movies for Grownups Awards	January 11, 2020	Readers' Choice Poll	Marriage Story	Nominated	
Academy Awards	February 9, 2020	Best Picture	Noah Baumbach, David Heyman	Nominated	
Academy Awards	February 9, 2020	Best Actor	Adam Driver	Nominated	
Academy Awards	February 9, 2020	Best Actress	Scarlett Johansson	Nominated	
Academy Awards	February 9, 2020	Best Supporting Actress	Laura Dern	Won	
Academy Awards	February 9, 2020	Best Original Screenplay	Noah Baumbach	Nominated	
Academy Awards	February 9, 2020	Best Original Score	Randy Newman	Nominated	
American Cinema Editors	January 17, 2020	Best Edited Feature Film – Dramatic	Jennifer Lame	Nominated	
American Film Institute	December 4, 2019	Top 10 Films of 2019	Marriage Story	Won	
Belgian Film Critics Association	January 4, 2020	Grand Prix	Marriage Story	Nominated	
British Academy Film Awards	February 2, 2020	Best Actor in a Leading Role	Adam Driver	Nominated	
British Academy Film Awards	February 2, 2020	Best Actress in a Leading Role	Scarlett Johansson	Nominated	
British Academy Film Awards	February 2, 2020	Best Actress in a Supporting Role	Laura Dern	Won	
British Academy Film Awards	February 2, 2020	Best Original Screenplay	Noah Baumbach	Nominated	
British Academy Film Awards	February 2, 2020	Best Casting	Douglas Aibel and Francine Maisler	Nominated	
British Independent Film Awards	December 1, 2019	Best International Independent Film	Marriage Story	Nominated	
Casting Society of America	January 30, 2020	Feature Studio Or Independent – Drama	Francine Maisler, Douglas Aibel and Kathy Driscoll-Mohler	Won	
Critics' Choice Movie Awards	January 12, 2020	Best Picture	Marriage Story	Nominated	
Critics' Choice Movie Awards	January 12, 2020	Best Director	Noah Baumbach	Nominated	
Critics' Choice Movie Awards	January 12, 2020	Best Acting Ensemble	Marriage Story	Nominated	
Critics' Choice Movie Awards	January 12, 2020	Best Actor	Adam Driver	Nominated	
Critics' Choice Movie Awards	January 12, 2020	Best Actress	Scarlett Johansson	Nominated	
Critics' Choice Movie Awards	January 12, 2020	Best Supporting Actress	Laura Dern	Won	
Critics' Choice Movie Awards	January 12, 2020	Best Score	Randy Newman	Nominated	
Critics' Choice Movie Awards	January 12, 2020	Best Original Screenplay	Noah Baumbach	Nominated	
Dallas-Fort Worth Film Critics Association	December 16, 2019	Best Picture	Marriage Story	Runner-up	
Dallas-Fort Worth Film Critics Association	December 16, 2019	Best Director	Noah Baumbach	Runner-up	
Dallas-Fort Worth Film Critics Association	December 16, 2019	Best Screenplay	Noah Baumbach	Won	
Dallas-Fort Worth Film Critics Association	December 16, 2019	Best Actor	Adam Driver	Won	
Dallas-Fort Worth Film Critics Association	December 16, 2019	Best Actress	Scarlett Johansson	Won	
Dallas-Fort Worth Film Critics Association	December 16, 2019	Best Supporting Actress	Laura Dern	Won	
Detroit Film Critics Society	December 9, 2019	Best Picture	Marriage Story	Nominated	
Detroit Film Critics Society	December 9, 2019	Best Director	Noah Baumbach	Nominated	
Detroit Film Critics Society	December 9, 2019	Best Actor	Adam Driver	Won	
Detroit Film Critics Society	December 9, 2019	Best Actress	Scarlett Johansson	Won	
Detroit Film Critics Society	December 9, 2019	Best Supporting Actress	Laura Dern	Won	
Detroit Film Critics Society	December 9, 2019	Best Screenplay	Noah Baumbach	Won	
Dorian Awards	January 8, 2020	Screenplay of the Year	Noah Baumbach	Nominated	
Dorian Awards	January 8, 2020	Film Performance of the Year — Actor	Adam Driver	Nominated	
Dorian Awards	January 8, 2020	Film Performance of the Year — Actress	Scarlett Johansson	Nominated	
Dorian Awards	January 8, 2020	Supporting Film Performance of the Year — Actress	Laura Dern	Nominated	
Florida Film Critics Circle Awards	December 23, 2019	Best Picture	Marriage Story	Nominated	
Florida Film Critics Circle Awards	December 23, 2019	Best Actor	Adam Driver	Won	
Florida Film Critics Circle Awards	December 23, 2019	Best Actress	Scarlett Johansson	Won	
Florida Film Critics Circle Awards	December 23, 2019	Best Supporting Actress	Laura Dern	Won	
Florida Film Critics Circle Awards	December 23, 2019	Best Ensemble	Marriage Story	Nominated	
Florida Film Critics Circle Awards	December 23, 2019	Best Original Screenplay	Noah Baumbach	Nominated	
Florida Film Critics Circle Awards	December 23, 2019	Best Original Score	Randy Newman	Nominated	
Georgia Film Critics Association	January 10, 2020	Best Picture	Marriage Story	Nominated	
Georgia Film Critics Association	January 10, 2020	Best Actor	Adam Driver	Won	
Georgia Film Critics Association	January 10, 2020	Best Actress	Scarlett Johansson	Nominated	
Georgia Film Critics Association	January 10, 2020	Best Supporting Actress	Laura Dern	Nominated	
Georgia Film Critics Association	January 10, 2020	Best Original Screenplay	Noah Baumbach	Nominated	
Golden Globe Awards	January 5, 2020	Best Motion Picture – Drama	Marriage Story	Nominated	
Golden Globe Awards	January 5, 2020	Best Actor in a Motion Picture – Drama	Adam Driver	Nominated	
Golden Globe Awards	January 5, 2020	Best Actress in a Motion Picture – Drama	Scarlett Johansson	Nominated	
Golden Globe Awards	January 5, 2020	Best Supporting Actress – Motion Picture	Laura Dern	Won	
Golden Globe Awards	January 5, 2020	Best Screenplay	Noah Baumbach	Nominated	
Golden Globe Awards	January 5, 2020	Best Original Score	Randy Newman	Nominated	
Golden Tomato Awards	January 9, 2020	Best-Reviewed Limited Release	Marriage Story	3rd place	
Golden Tomato Awards	January 9, 2020	Best-Reviewed Drama	Marriage Story	3rd place	
Gotham Independent Film Awards	December 2, 2019	Best Feature	Marriage Story	Won	
Gotham Independent Film Awards	December 2, 2019	Best Actor	Adam Driver	Won	
Gotham Independent Film Awards	December 2, 2019	Best Screenplay	Noah Baumbach	Won	
Gotham Independent Film Awards	December 2, 2019	Audience Award	Marriage Story	Won	
Hollywood Critics Association Awards	January 9, 2020	Best Picture	Marriage Story	Nominated	
Hollywood Critics Association Awards	January 9, 2020	Best Male Director	Noah Baumbach	Won	
Hollywood Critics Association Awards	January 9, 2020	Best Original Screenplay	Noah Baumbach	Nominated	
Hollywood Critics Association Awards	January 9, 2020	Best Actor	Adam Driver	Nominated	
Hollywood Critics Association Awards	January 9, 2020	Best Actress	Scarlett Johansson	Nominated	
Hollywood Critics Association Awards	January 9, 2020	Best Supporting Actress	Laura Dern	Nominated	
Hollywood Film Awards	November 3, 2019	Hollywood Supporting Actress Award	Laura Dern	Won	
Hollywood Film Awards	November 3, 2019	Hollywood Film Composer Award	Randy Newman	Won	
Hollywood Music in Media Awards	November 20, 2019	Best Original Score in a Feature Film	Randy Newman	Nominated	
Hollywood Music in Media Awards	November 20, 2019	Best Music Supervision – Film	George Drakoulias	Nominated	
Huading Awards	October 29, 2020	Best Global Actress in a Motion Picture	Scarlett Johansson	Won	
Huading Awards	October 29, 2020	Best Global Supporting Actress in a Motion Picture	Laura Dern	Nominated	
Independent Spirit Awards	February 8, 2020	Best Feature	David Heyman and Noah Baumbach	Nominated	
Independent Spirit Awards	February 8, 2020	Best Screenplay	Noah Baumbach	Won	
Independent Spirit Awards	February 8, 2020	Robert Altman Award	Noah Baumbach, Douglas Aibel, Francine Maisler, Alan Alda, Laura Dern, Adam Driver, Julie Hagerty, Scarlett Johansson, Ray Liotta, Azhy Robertson and Merritt Wever	Won	
Los Angeles Film Critics Association Awards	December 8, 2019	Best Screenplay	Noah Baumbach	Won	
National Board of Review	December 3, 2019	Top Ten Films	Marriage Story	Won	
New York Film Critics Circle Awards	December 4, 2019	Best Supporting Actress	Laura Dern	Won (Note: Also for Little Women.)	
New York Film Critics Online Awards	December 7, 2019	Best Supporting Actress	Laura Dern	Won	
Online Film Critics Society	January 6, 2020	Best Picture	Marriage Story	4th place	
Online Film Critics Society	January 6, 2020	Best Actor	Adam Driver	Won	
Online Film Critics Society	January 6, 2020	Best Actress	Scarlett Johansson	Nominated	
Online Film Critics Society	January 6, 2020	Best Supporting Actress	Laura Dern	Nominated	
Online Film Critics Society	January 6, 2020	Best Original Screenplay	Noah Baumbach	Nominated	
Online Film Critics Society	January 6, 2020	Best Original Score	Randy Newman	Nominated	
Producers Guild of America Awards	January 18, 2020	Best Theatrical Motion Picture	Noah Baumbach and David Heyman	Nominated	
Santa Barbara International Film Festival	January 17, 2020	Outstanding Performers of the Year Award	Adam Driver; Scarlett Johansson	Won	
San Diego Film Critics Society	December 9, 2019	Best Picture	Marriage Story	Runner-up	
San Diego Film Critics Society	December 9, 2019	Best Director	Noah Baumbach	Runner-up	
San Diego Film Critics Society	December 9, 2019	Best Actor	Adam Driver	Won (Note: Tied with Joaquin Phoenix for Joker.)	
San Diego Film Critics Society	December 9, 2019	Best Actress	Scarlett Johansson	Nominated	
San Diego Film Critics Society	December 9, 2019	Best Supporting Actress	Laura Dern	Runner-up	
San Diego Film Critics Society	December 9, 2019	Best Original Screenplay	Noah Baumbach	Won	
San Diego Film Critics Society	December 9, 2019	Best Editing	Jennifer Lame	Nominated	
San Diego Film Critics Society	December 9, 2019	Best Ensemble	Marriage Story	Nominated	
San Diego International Film Festival	November 4, 2019	Audience Choice – Studio Film	Marriage Story	Won	
Satellite Awards	February 7, 2020	Best Motion Picture – Drama	Marriage Story	Nominated	
Satellite Awards	February 7, 2020	Best Director	Noah Baumbach	Nominated	
Satellite Awards	February 7, 2020	Best Screenplay – Original	Noah Baumbach	Won	
Satellite Awards	February 7, 2020	Best Actor – Motion Picture Drama	Adam Driver	Nominated	
Satellite Awards	February 7, 2020	Best Actress – Motion Picture Drama	Scarlett Johansson	Won	
Satellite Awards	February 7, 2020	Best Supporting Actress – Motion Picture	Laura Dern	Nominated	
Satellite Awards	February 7, 2020	Best Original Score	Randy Newman	Nominated	
Satellite Awards	February 7, 2020	Best Film Editing	Jennifer Lame	Nominated	
Screen Actors Guild Awards	January 19, 2020	Outstanding Performance by a Male Actor in a Leading Role	Adam Driver	Nominated	
Screen Actors Guild Awards	January 19, 2020	Outstanding Performance by a Female Actor in a Leading Role	Scarlett Johansson	Nominated	
Screen Actors Guild Awards	January 19, 2020	Outstanding Performance by a Female Actor in a Supporting Role	Laura Dern	Won	
Seattle Film Critics Society	December 16, 2019	Best Picture of the Year	Marriage Story	Nominated	
Seattle Film Critics Society	December 16, 2019	Best Actor in a Leading Role	Adam Driver	Won	
Seattle Film Critics Society	December 16, 2019	Best Actress in a Leading Role	Scarlett Johansson	Nominated	
Seattle Film Critics Society	December 16, 2019	Best Actress in a Supporting Role	Laura Dern	Nominated	
Seattle Film Critics Society	December 16, 2019	Best Screenplay	Noah Baumbach	Nominated	
St. Louis Film Critics Association	December 15, 2019	Best Film	Marriage Story	Nominated	
St. Louis Film Critics Association	December 15, 2019	Best Actor	Adam Driver	Nominated	
St. Louis Film Critics Association	December 15, 2019	Best Actress	Scarlett Johansson	Won	
St. Louis Film Critics Association	December 15, 2019	Best Supporting Actress	Laura Dern	Runner-up	
St. Louis Film Critics Association	December 15, 2019	Best Original Screenplay	Noah Baumbach	Won (Note: Tied with Quentin Tarantino for Once Upon a Time in Hollywood.)	
St. Louis Film Critics Association	December 15, 2019	Best Score	Randy Newman	Runner-up	
St. Louis Film Critics Association	December 15, 2019	Best Editing	Jennifer Lame	Nominated	
St. Louis Film Critics Association	December 15, 2019	Best Scene	Charlie Sings	Nominated	
St. Louis Film Critics Association	December 15, 2019	Best Scene	Apartment fight	Nominated	
Toronto International Film Festival	September 15, 2019	People's Choice Award	Marriage Story	Runner-up	
Vancouver Film Critics Circle	December 16, 2019	Best Film	Marriage Story	Nominated	
Vancouver Film Critics Circle	December 16, 2019	Best Actress	Scarlett Johansson	Won	
Vancouver Film Critics Circle	December 16, 2019	Best Actor	Adam Driver	Won	
Vancouver Film Critics Circle	December 16, 2019	Best Supporting Actress	Laura Dern	Won	
Vancouver Film Critics Circle	December 16, 2019	Best Screenplay	Noah Baumbach	Won	
Washington D.C. Area Film Critics Association	December 8, 2019	Best Film	Marriage Story	Nominated	
Washington D.C. Area Film Critics Association	December 8, 2019	Best Actor	Adam Driver	Won	
Washington D.C. Area Film Critics Association	December 8, 2019	Best Actress	Scarlett Johansson	Nominated	
Washington D.C. Area Film Critics Association	December 8, 2019	Best Supporting Actress	Laura Dern	Nominated	
Washington D.C. Area Film Critics Association	December 8, 2019	Best Original Screenplay	Noah Baumbach	Won	
Washington D.C. Area Film Critics Association	December 8, 2019	Best Original Score	Randy Newman	Nominated	
Writers Guild of America Awards	February 1, 2020	Best Original Screenplay	Noah Baumbach	Nominated	

== See also ==
- 2019 in film
