= Marriage Story =

2019 film by Noah Baumbach

- Theatrical release poster
- Directed by: Noah Baumbach
- Written by: Noah Baumbach
- Produced by: David Heyman; Noah Baumbach
- Starring: Scarlett Johansson; Adam Driver; Laura Dern; Alan Alda; Ray Liotta; Julie Hagerty; Merritt Wever
- Cinematography: Robbie Ryan
- Edited by: Jennifer Lame
- Music by: Randy Newman
- Production company: Heyday Films
- Distributed by: Netflix
- Release dates: August 29, 2019 (Venice); November 6, 2019 (United States); November 15, 2019 (United Kingdom); December 6, 2019 (Netflix)
- Running time: 137 minutes
- Countries: United States; United Kingdom
- Language: English
- Budget: $18 million
- Box office: $2.3 million

Marriage Story is a 2019 dramedy film written and directed by Noah Baumbach, who also produced the film with David Heyman. It stars Scarlett Johansson and Adam Driver as a couple going through a bi-coastal divorce complicated by custody issues surrounding their son. Laura Dern, Alan Alda, Ray Liotta, Julie Hagerty, and Merritt Wever appear in supporting roles.

Announced in November 2017, with the cast joining that same month, the film was shot in New York City and Los Angeles between January and April of the following year. Netflix released the film, which premiered at the 76th Venice International Film Festival on August 29, 2019, and began a limited theatrical release on November 6, followed by digital streaming on December 6.

The film received critical acclaim, particularly for Baumbach's direction and screenplay, and the performances of Johansson, Driver, and Dern. Among its numerous accolades were six nominations at the 92nd Academy Awards, including Best Picture, Best Actor (Driver), Best Actress (Johansson), Best Original Screenplay, and Best Original Score. For her performance, Dern won the Academy Award, Golden Globe, Screen Actors Guild Award, BAFTA Award and Critics' Choice Movie Award, all in the Best Supporting Actress category.

== Plot ==
Charlie Barber, a successful theater director in New York City with his own theater company, is helming a play that stars, as usual, his wife of ten years, Nicole, who is a former teenage movie actress. The couple is experiencing marital troubles and sees a mediator, who suggests they each write down what they love about one another, but Nicole is too embarrassed to read hers aloud, and they decide to forgo counseling.

When Nicole is offered a starring role in a television pilot in Los Angeles, she decides to leave Charlie's company and go to live with her mother in West Hollywood, taking their son, Henry, with her. Thinking the separation will only be temporary, Charlie remains in New York, as his play is moving to Broadway. Despite the couple agreeing to split amicably and forgo lawyers, Nicole—encouraged by her producer—hires Nora Fanshaw, a high-profile family lawyer, who gets Nicole to open up about how she gradually felt neglected by Charlie and how he rejects her ideas and desires. Nicole also suspects that Charlie slept with Mary Ann, his stage manager.

Excited by the news that he has won a MacArthur Fellowship grant, Charlie visits Nicole's family in LA, and she serves him with divorce papers. He meets with Jay Marotta, a brash and expensive lawyer who urges Charlie to fight dirty, but Charlie returns to New York without hiring Jay. After receiving a phone call from Nora, who warns him to get a lawyer soon or risk losing custody of Henry, Charlie returns to LA and hires Bert Spitz, an empathetic older lawyer who favors a civil and conciliatory approach.

On Halloween, which Charlie spends in LA, Henry mentions to Charlie that Nicole wants to stay in California permanently. Charlie calls Nicole and angrily interrogates her, and Nicole reveals she hacked his emails and found proof of his affair with Mary Ann.

Bert counsels Charlie to rent an apartment in LA to strengthen his custody case. To avoid going to court, Bert and Charlie meet with Nora and Nicole. Nora says Charlie refused to respect Nicole's wishes to move back to LA and claims Henry would prefer to stay with his mother rather than fly back and forth between coasts. Bert advises Charlie to give in on this point, but Charlie does not want to be separated from his son, so he fires Bert.

Using the first installment of his fellowship grant, Charlie hires Jay. In court, Nora and Jay argue aggressively on behalf of their clients, leading to a series of character assassinations. Nora highlights Charlie's emotional distance and past infidelity, while Jay exaggerates Nicole's drinking habits and threatens criminal action for hacking Charlie's emails. Meanwhile, Nicole and Charlie try to remain friendly out of court and share time with Henry, who is increasingly annoyed by the back-and-forth.

Disillusioned with the legal process, the couple decide to meet in private, but their good intentions do not keep the discussion from escalating dangerously. Nicole scathingly claims that Charlie has now fully merged with his own selfishness, and Charlie angrily confesses that he wishes Nicole was dead. However, feeling remorseful for what he said, Charlie breaks down in tears and tearfully apologizes for his behavior and outbursts before Nicole comforts him. Shortly after their argument, they reach an agreement and finalize the divorce. However, Nora negotiates slightly better terms for Nicole behind her back, causing Nicole to feel uncomfortable.

The following Halloween, Charlie again comes to LA. He learns Nicole has a new boyfriend and is nominated for an Emmy Award for directing an episode of her television series. He informs her that he has taken a residency at UCLA and will therefore be living in LA for a while. While everyone is changing into their costumes, Charlie discovers Henry reading the list of things Nicole loves about Charlie that she wrote during mediation. Henry asks Charlie to read the rest aloud to him, and Charlie does so, becoming emotional as Nicole, unnoticed, watches from the doorway. After trick-or-treating, Nicole offers to let Charlie take Henry home, even though it is her night. She notices Charlie's shoe is untied, and, as his arms are full carrying Henry, ties it for him before he leaves.

== Cast ==
- Scarlett Johansson as Nicole Barber
- Adam Driver as Charlie Barber
- Laura Dern as Nora Fanshaw, Nicole's lawyer
- Alan Alda as Bert Spitz, Charlie's first lawyer
- Ray Liotta as Jay Marotta, Charlie's second lawyer
- Julie Hagerty as Sandra, Nicole's mother
- Merritt Wever as Cassie, Nicole's sister
- Azhy Robertson as Henry Barber, Nicole and Charlie's son
- Wallace Shawn as Frank, a member of Charlie's theater group
- Martha Kelly as Nancy Katz, the court-appointed evaluator
- Mark O'Brien as Carter Mitchum, the scientific consultant on Nicole's TV show
- Mickey Sumner as Beth, an actor in Charlie's theater group
- Matthew Shear as Terry, an actor in Charlie's theater group
- Brooke Bloom as Mary Ann, the stage manager of Charlie's theater group
- Robert Smigel as Nicole and Charlie's mediator
- Sarah Jones as Carol, one of the producers of Nicole's TV show
- Carlos Jacott as Dennis, one of the producers of Nicole's TV show
- Dean Wareham as the cinematographer of Nicole's TV show
- Bashir Salahuddin as the director of Nicole's TV show
- Lucas Neff as Pablo, a flirty grip
- Tunde Adebimpe as Sam, Cassie's husband
- Kyle Bornheimer as Ted, a lawyer at Marotta's firm
- Pilar Holland as the law receptionist who turns Charlie away
- Rich Fulcher as Judge Neil Tilden

Matthew Maher, Gideon Glick, Jasmine Cephas Jones, Raymond J. Lee, Mary Wiseman, and Becca Blackwell appear in the film as unnamed actors in Charlie's theater group.

== Production ==
The premise for the film first came to Baumbach in 2016, while he was in post-production on The Meyerowitz Stories. He began to research the subject and met with three-time collaborator Driver to discuss the role. In November 2017, it was announced Driver, Johansson, Laura Dern, Merritt Wever, and Azhy Robertson were set to star in the film, with David Heyman producing under his Heyday Films banner, and Netflix producing and distributing. In March 2018, Kyle Bornheimer joined the cast of the film, and that June it was announced that Ray Liotta had also been cast.

Principal photography began on January 15, 2018, and lasted 47 days through April 2018. Filming took place in both New York City and Los Angeles.

Speaking of writing the film, given his 2013 divorce from actress Jennifer Jason Leigh, as well as his parents' divorce (which served as inspiration for his earlier film The Squid and the Whale), Baumbach said:

I have a real connection to the material ... [but] I was also at a time in my life where many of my friends were getting divorced. I saw it as an opportunity to do something more expansive, so I did a lot of research. I interviewed a lot of my friends, and friends of friends, and then also lawyers, judges, mediators.

Following the film's release, Baumbach said, "I showed [Leigh] the script and then I showed her the movie a little bit ago. She likes it a lot."

=== Music ===
Randy Newman composed the film's score—his second for Baumbach, following The Meyerowitz Stories (2017). The score was recorded at 20th Century Fox Studios's Newman Scoring Stage (named in honor of Newman's uncles Alfred and Lionel) using a 40-piece chamber orchestra with limited instruments.

The film's soundtrack album was released by Lakeshore Records. "What I Love About Nicole", the first track of the album, was released as a single on November 1, 2019. This was followed by the digital release of the album on November 15, and its physical release on December 13.

== Release ==
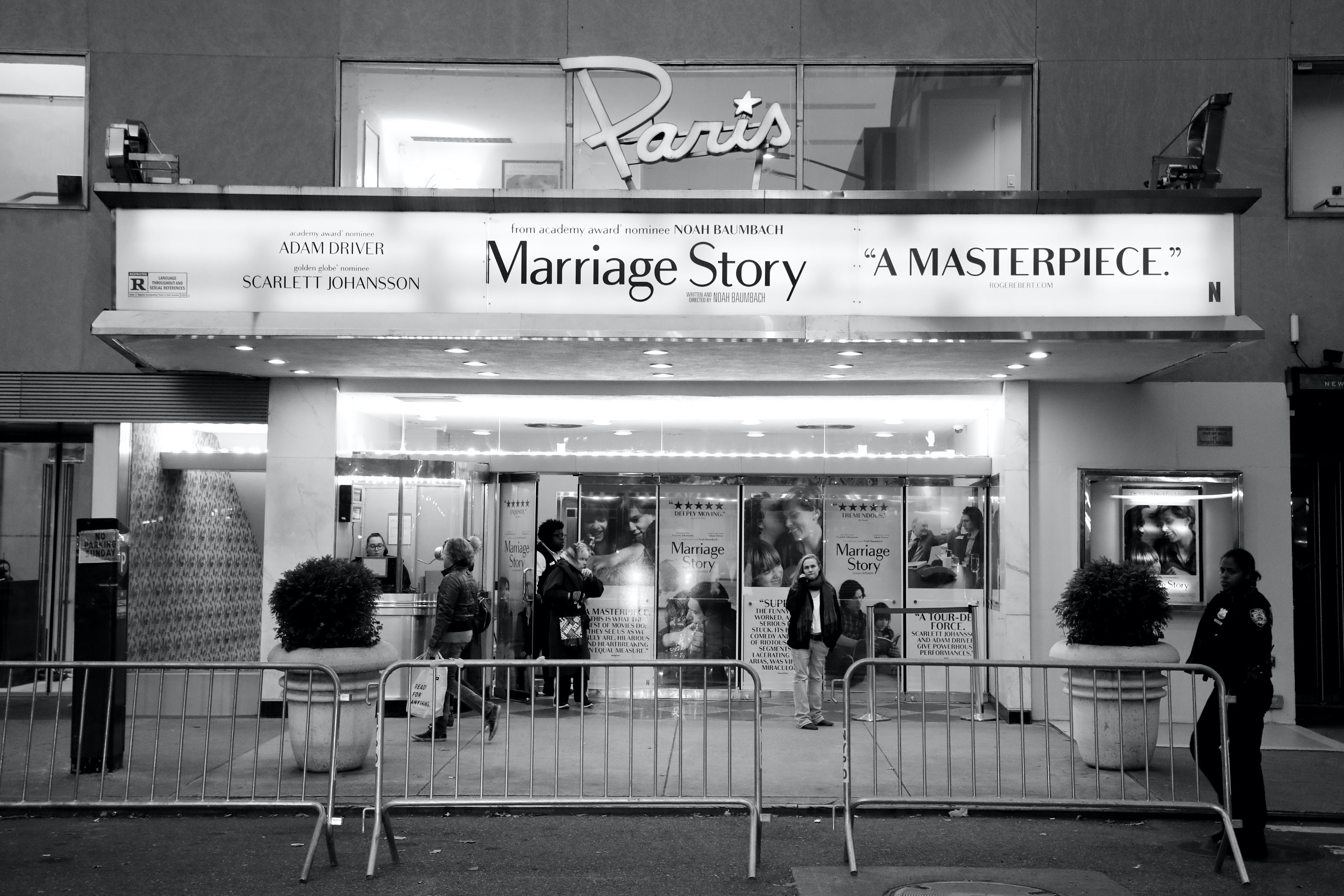
Marriage Story playing at the Paris Theater in New York City

Marriage Story had its world premiere at the Venice Film Festival on August 29, 2019. It was screened at the Telluride Film Festival on August 31, the Toronto International Film Festival (where it was first runner-up for the People's Choice Award) on September 8, the New York Film Festival (where it served as the Centerpiece selection) on October 4, and the BFI London Film Festival on October 6.

Netflix gave the film a limited release in theaters beginning on November 6, 2019, before making it available for streaming on December 6.

=== Home media ===
The film was released on DVD and Blu-ray by The Criterion Collection on July 21, 2020.

== Reception ==
=== Box office ===
Although Netflix does not publicly disclose the theatrical grosses of all of its films, IndieWire estimated Marriage Story grossed around $160,000 from five theaters over its opening weekend (and a total of $200,000 over its first five days). The site wrote that "normally, these (estimated) numbers would be disappointing," but, "given the theaters and more limited seating, as well as awareness of imminent streaming access within the month", it was sufficient for Netflix. Playing at 16 theaters the following weekend, the film made an estimated $140,000, and then it made $340,000 from 85 theaters its third weekend. Expanding to 130 theaters for its fourth weekend of release, the film made $360,000, for a month-long running total of $1.2 million. The following weekend, despite being released digitally onto Netflix that Friday, the film made an estimated $300,000 from 120 theaters, and then $120,000 from 80 theaters the following week. In all, Marriage Story grossed an estimated $2 million at the North American box office, and $333,686 in other territories, for a worldwide total of $2.3 million.

=== Critical response ===
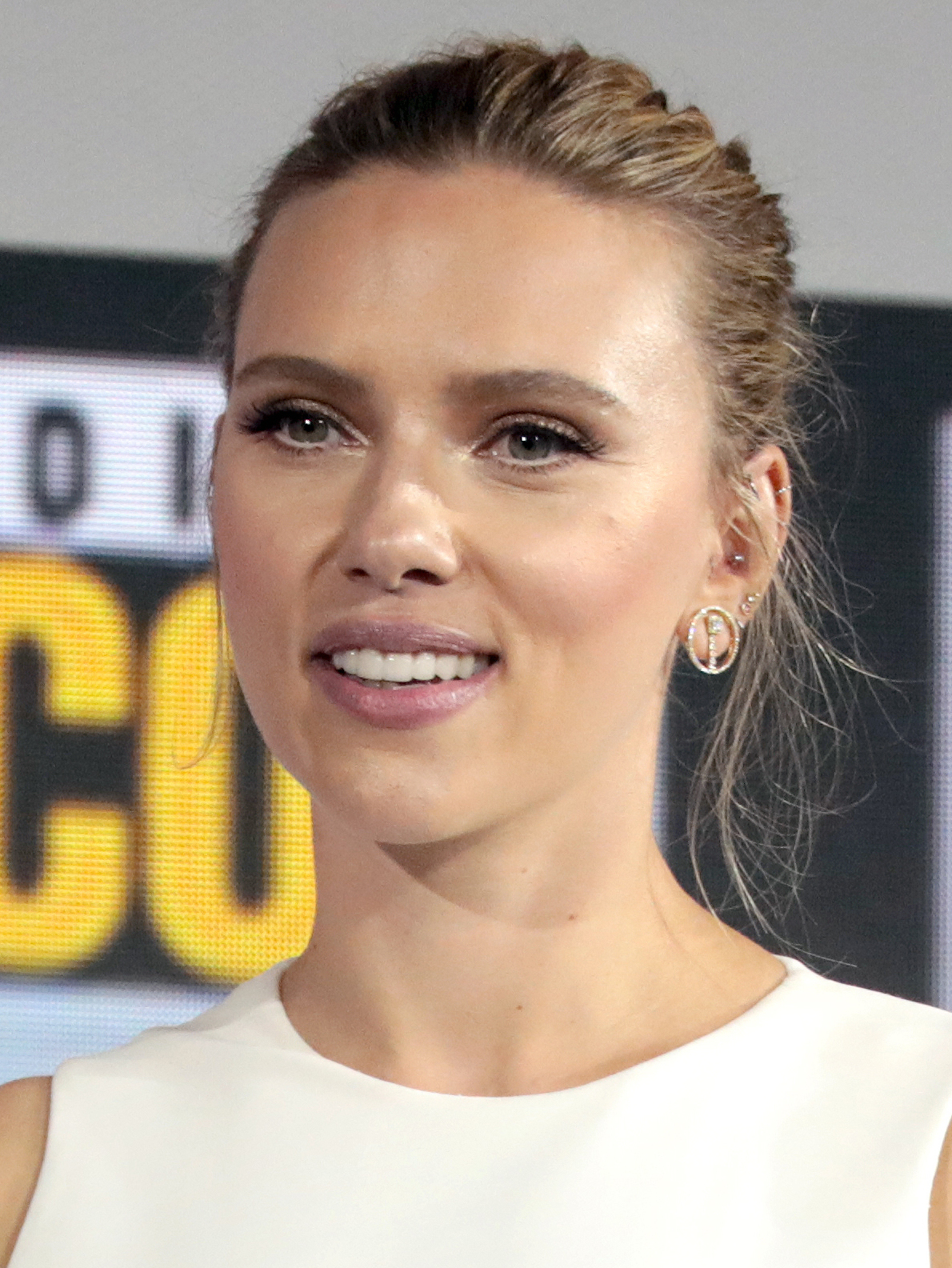
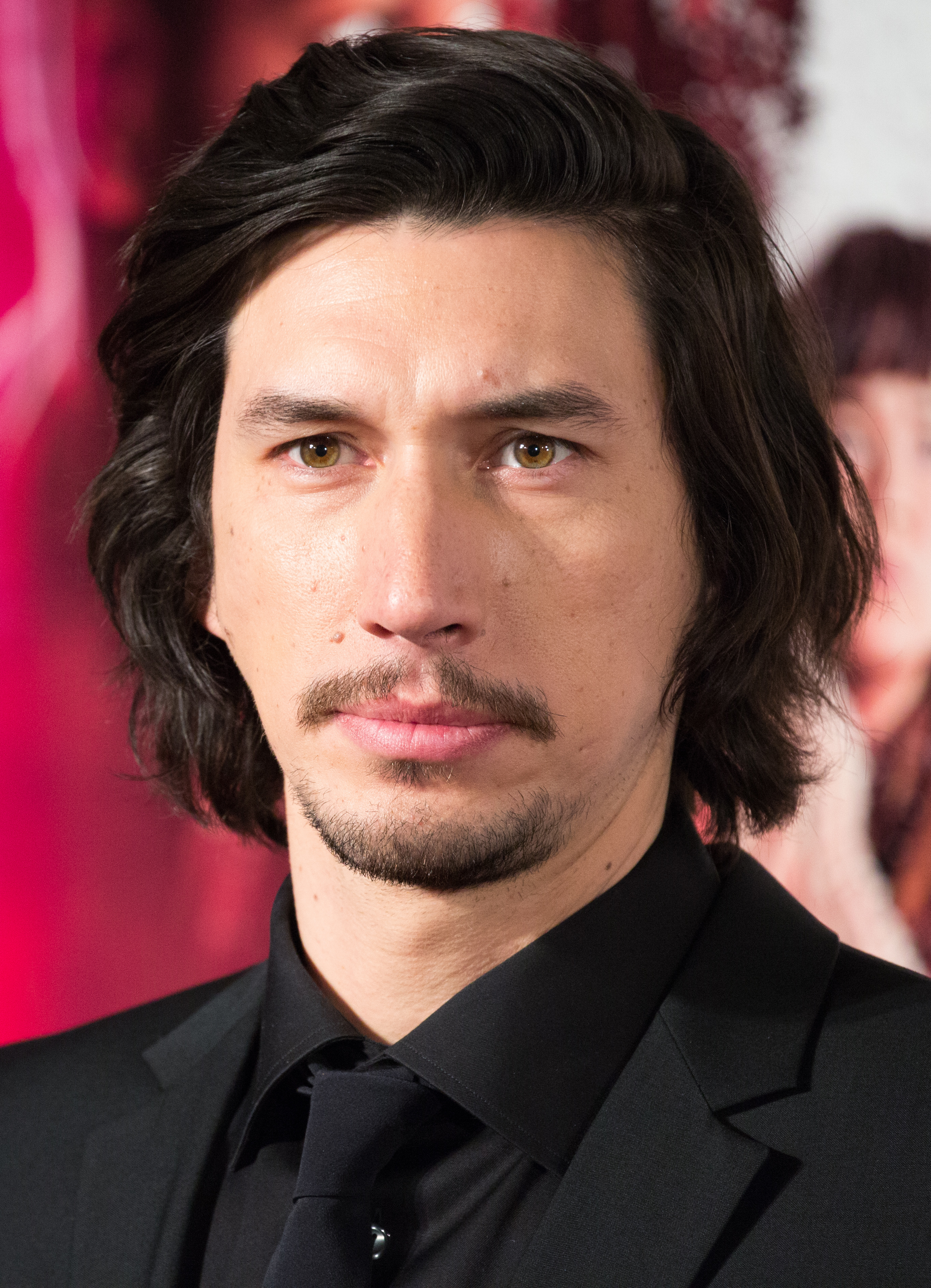
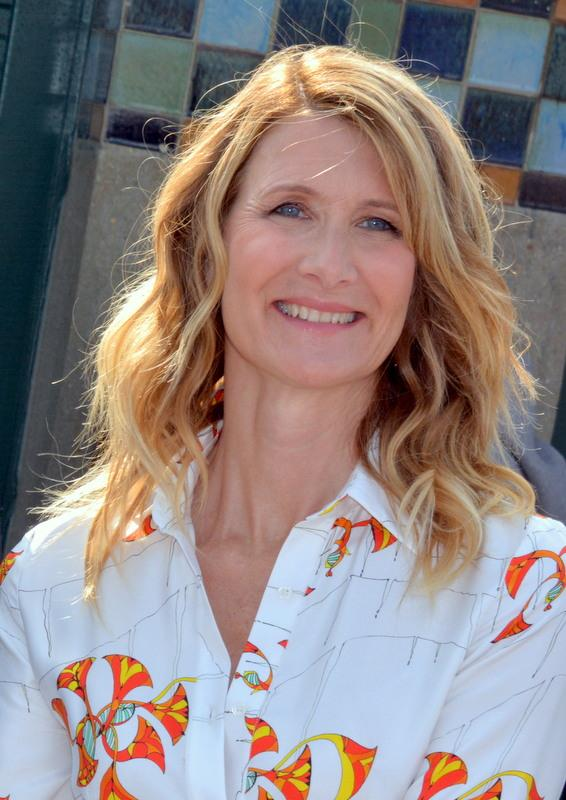
The performances of Scarlett Johansson, Adam Driver, and Laura Dern garnered widespread critical acclaim, earning them Academy Award nominations for Best Actress, Best Actor, and Best Supporting Actress, respectively, with Dern winning her category.

On the review aggregator website Rotten Tomatoes, 95% of 405 critics' reviews are positive, with an average rating of 8.8/10. The website's consensus reads: "Observing a splintering union with compassion and expansive grace, the powerfully acted Marriage Story ranks among writer-director Noah Baumbach's best works." Metacritic, which uses a weighted average, assigned the film a score of 94 out of 100, based on 53 critics, indicating "universal acclaim".

Critic Owen Gleiberman of Variety wrote of the film: "At once funny, scalding, and stirring, built around two bravura performances of incredible sharpness and humanity, it's the work of a major film artist, one who shows that he can capture life in all its emotional detail and complexity — and, in the process, make a piercing statement about how our society now works." Alonso Duralde of TheWrap praised the acting and Baumbach's screenplay, saying: "One wonders if Baumbach left references to Kramer vs. Kramer (1979) or Two for the Road (1967) on the cutting-room floor, but either way, Marriage Story is a film that deserves to be mentioned in their company. It's devastating, essential, and destined to be remembered long after this awards cycle ends." In his review for The Hollywood Reporter, Jon Frosch concurred, writing: "Other American films about divorce have portrayed this phenomenon — the legal process driving and shaping the couple's feelings rather than vice versa — but none with the force and clarity of this one [...] It's also funny and, when you least expect it (and most need it), almost unbearably tender, thanks in large part to the sensational leads, who deliver the deepest, most alive and attuned performances of their careers." Rating the film 5 stars out of 5, Peter Bradshaw of The Guardian called it a "wonderfully sweet, sad and funny film" that serves as a "glorious laugh-out-loud, cry-out-loud portrait of a relationship in its death throes" and praised the performances of the cast. Writing for The Washington Post, Ann Hornaday gave the film 3.5 stars out of 4 and praised Johansson and Driver as the "two-person fulcrum around which this funny-sad, happy-harrowing film revolves."

In a mixed review, GQ's David Levesley opined that the film was "fundamentally, a good piece of cinema", but disliked the unacknowledged upper-class privilege that the characters possessed, commenting: "The world of third-wave coffee, delicatessens and Upper West Side therapy has been done to death and does not speak to as much of the human condition as the people wading through it themselves seem to think." Armond White of The National Review also panned the film's bourgeois themes and the lead actors' performances, writing: "This story is really about class rivalry clouded by a sex-and-cinema surface. The obnoxious sentimentality of Marriage Story forces a filmmaker's self-righteousness on us [...] It is Johansson and Driver who suffer Baumbach's superficiality. This is his least-bad film only because the quality of the performances [of the supporting cast] is improved."

=== Internet memes ===
Marriage Story has become the subject of internet memes. According to Wired, an Internet meme of Adam Driver punching a wall during Charlie and Nicole's argument scene has contributed to "re-contextualizing Charlie and Nicole's fight into something light and silly". Driver punching a wall has been repurposed to represent general arguments over trivial matters in which a participant becomes angry and overreacts. In August 2025, it was revealed that the United States Department of Agriculture in Oregon was playing audio of the film's central argument scene using drones to deter wolves from attacking livestock.

=== Accolades ===
Marriage Story was chosen by the American Film Institute, the National Board of Review, and Time magazine as one of the ten best films of the year. It received a leading six nominations (including for Best Motion Picture – Drama) at the 77th Golden Globe Awards, with Dern winning Best Supporting Actress – Motion Picture. The film received eight nominations at the 25th Critics' Choice Awards, three nominations at the 26th Screen Actors Guild Awards (for the performances of Driver, Johansson, and Dern), five nominations at the 73rd British Academy Film Awards, and six nominations at the 92nd Academy Awards. Dern won the Academy Award for Best Supporting Actress for her performance in the film. Time Magazine's annual best performances of the year list by Stephanie Zacharek listed Driver's performance as the third best film acting performance of 2019.
