= The Baltimorons =

American independent film

- Theatrical release poster
- Directed by: Jay Duplass
- Written by: Jay Duplass; Michael Strassner
- Produced by: David Bonnett Jr.; Michael Strassner; Drew Langer
- Starring: Michael Strassner; Liz Larsen; Olivia Luccardi
- Cinematography: Jon Bregel
- Edited by: Jack Deuby
- Music by: Jordan Seigel
- Production company: Duplass Brothers Productions
- Distributed by: Independent Film Company; Sapan Studio
- Release dates: March 8, 2025 (SXSW); September 5, 2025 (United States)
- Running time: 101 minutes
- Country: United States
- Language: English
- Box office: $1 million

The Baltimorons is a 2025 American comedy film directed by Jay Duplass, who co-wrote the screenplay with Michael Strassner. Strassner, Liz Larsen, and Olivia Luccardi star in the film. Michael Strassner, David Bonnett Jr., and Drew Langer produced the film through the company Duplass Brothers Productions. It premiered at the 2025 South by Southwest Film & TV Festival on March 8.

== Plot ==
On Christmas Eve in Baltimore, engaged couple Cliff and Brittany celebrate Cliff reaching six months of sobriety. While arriving at Brittany’s mother’s house for festivities, Cliff falls and knocks out his tooth, necessitating an emergency trip to dentist Didi Daw. During the treatment, she receives a call from her daughter, who tells her that Didi’s ex-husband Conway and his girlfriend Patty have gotten a surprise courthouse wedding, derailing Didi’s Christmas Eve plans.

After Cliff discovers his car has been towed and he cannot get a rideshare, Didi agrees to give him a ride to the tow lot. After accidentally ending up locked inside the lot, he calls his friend Marvin, who helps to free him, and pressures Cliff to attend a comedy show that evening; Cliff, who stopped doing comedy when he got sober after a suicide attempt, reluctantly agrees. Finding out that there is no more food at Brittany’s family’s house, Cliff invites Didi to go out for dinner with him. She reluctantly agrees, but then abruptly decides to go to Conway and Patty’s wedding celebration, bringing Cliff with her. Cliff masquerades as her date and tells flattering lies to Conway and Patty, including that he works for the Baltimore Ravens and can get them free tickets.

Didi asks to go to Marvin’s comedy show with Cliff; he agrees after a tense phone call with Brittany, who worries that Cliff is regressing. Cliff tells Didi that he was fired from his improv troupe and lost a shot at joining the cast of a popular television show after being accused of bullying by another improviser. At the show, Marvin unexpectedly asks Cliff to perform his popular sketch ‘The Baltimorons.’ Despite a mixed reaction to his presence at the show, he goes on stage, encouraged by Didi, but is unable to find a willing volunteer to perform with him. Didi joins him, and the two perform an improvised, comedic version of Cliff’s dental appointment. The scene takes a romantic turn, and the two share a kiss, only for Cliff to back off and end the improv to a positive reception.

After the show, Didi is upset about Cliff’s reaction to her kiss. Cliff tells her that he panicked because he smelled alcohol on her breath, and opens up about his suicide attempt. Didi forgives him, and the two steal Conway’s crabbing boat for a late-night cruise. When they return to the dock, they are met by Brittany, who tells Cliff that she thought he had drowned himself based on his location. She expresses concern for Cliff’s behaviour and leaves to sleep at her mother’s house. While driving, Cliff comes across Didi, who is being arrested for a DUI. He bails her out of jail with help from his uncle, and the two spend the night together. The following morning, Didi insists that Cliff go home to Brittany.

Cliff returns home and talks to Brittany, revealing his father’s own suicide and apologizing for his inability to live a normal life, while affirming that he has no plans to kill himself or to start drinking again. He then attends an Alcoholics Anonymous meeting and returns to Didi’s house, giving her a crab that they caught on Conway’s boat as a Christmas present. She questions where their relationship is heading, but invites Cliff in for Christmas brunch.

== Cast ==
- Michael Strassner as Cliff
- Liz Larsen as Didi
- Olivia Luccardi as Brittany

== Production ==
The film is directed by Jay Duplass and has David Bonnett Jr., Michael Strassner, Drew Langer as producers. The script is written by Jay Duplass and Michael Strassner, who also has a starring role alongside Liz Larsen and Olivia Luccardi.

== Release ==
The film premiered at the 2025 South by Southwest Film & TV Festival. In April 2025, IFC Films and Sapan Studio acquired the distribution rights. The film was released in New York City on September 5, 2025, followed by a wide release on September 12.

== Reception ==
On the review aggregator website Rotten Tomatoes, 93% of 75 critics' reviews are positive, with an average rating of 7.8/10. The website's consensus reads: "Like the most delightful of stocking stuffers, The Baltimorons is modestly-sized but incredibly winning with its outsized charm." Metacritic, which uses a weighted average, assigned the film a score of 75 out of 100, based on 15 critics, indicating "generally favorable" reviews.

At the 41st Independent Spirit Awards, the film received nominations for the Best Breakthrough Performance (Liz Larsen) and the John Cassavetes Award.
