= Liz Larsen =

American actress

- Born: Philadelphia, Pennsylvania
- Occupations: Television actress, theater actress
- Spouse: Sal Viviano (m. 1994) (2 children)
- Relatives: Georgie Price (grandfather)

Liz Larsen is an American actress.

== Early life ==
Larsen was born in Philadelphia, Pennsylvania. She attended George School in Newtown, Pennsylvania. She is one of three daughters whose grandfather was vaudevillian Georgie Price and whose mother, uncle, and maternal grandmother were performers. Because her mother handled press relations for the Bucks County Playhouse, Larsen grew up around acting, with interns from the Playhouse as babysitters, "and if they needed a little girl for something I would be in it", she said, "I didn't even question it, ever." She gained additional acting experience at the George School, in public high school, State University of New York at Purchase, and in rural stock companies' summer seasons.

== Career ==
Larsen is best known for playing Jessica Reed on Law & Order. Larsen appeared on Broadway in The Most Happy Fella revival (1992), Hairspray, The Rocky Horror Show, Damn Yankees, Starmites, and Fiddler on the Roof. She has performed in Beautiful: The Carole King Musical since its opening in 2014. Her performance in The Most Happy Fella resulted in an LA Drama League Award and nominations for a Drama Desk Award, an Outer Critic's Circle Award, and a Tony Award.

== Filmography ==
=== Film ===
Year	Title	Role	Notes
1993	The Saint of Fort Washington	River Banks Woman	Uncredited
1995	Dr. Jekyll and Ms. Hyde	Detective Carson	
2000	Keeping the Faith	Leslie	
2008	Bittersweet	Liz	
2012	Commentary	Amanda Ramsay-Blowman	
2013	Frostbite	Jill	
2013	A Miracle in Spanish Harlem	Nurse #1	
2014	Bridge and Tunnel	Mrs. Richter	
2016	The Hudson Tribes	Detective Carusso	
2017	One Percent More Humid	Catherine's mother	
2017	The Boy Downstairs	Diana	
2018	The Week Of	Mrs. Katz	
2025	The Baltimorons	Didi	
2025	For Worse	Judy	

=== Television ===
Year	Title	Role	Notes
1992–2007	Law & Order	Various roles	17 episodes
1996	New York Crossing	Phoebe	Television film
1998	Exiled: A Law & Order Movie	C.S.U. Jessica Reed	Television film
2000, 2002	Law & Order: Special Victims Unit	D.A. Regal	3 episodes
2001	Deadline	Abby	Episode: "Just Lie Back"
2001	The Street	Realtor	Episode: "Junk Bonds"
2002	The Sopranos	Trish Reingold-Sapinsly	Episode: "Whitecaps"
2003	Law & Order: Criminal Intent	Frieda Merced	Episode: "But Not Forgotten"
2003	Third Watch	Freezer	3 episodes
2006	Conviction	Brenda Randolph	Episode: "Breakup"
2010	Wainy Days	Donna's Friend	Episode: "Donna"
2011	Submissions Only	Holly Freers	Episode: "Somethin' Else"
2011	Wiener & Wiener	Oscar's Mother	Episode: "Mommie Dearest"
2013	Bunheads	Sissy Deline	Episode: "You Wanna See Something?"
2015	The Americans	Realtor	Episode: "Open House"
2016	Madoff	Sheryl Weinstein	4 episodes
2017	The Breaks	Mrs. Aaron	Episode: "Amen, Brother"
2019	Mr. Robot	Trudy	3 episodes
2023	Sami	Choreographer	Episode: "The Commercial"
2023	Power Book III: Raising Kanan	Guidance Counselor	Episode: "Home Sweet Home"

=== Stage ===
Year	Title	Role	Notes
1981	Fiddler on the Roof	Chava	New York State Theatre
1982	Blues in the Night	The Girl with a Date (Understudy)	Rialto Theatre
1983	Annie	Lily St. Regis	Evening Dinner Theatre
1983	Cabaret	Sally Bowles	Evening Dinner Theatre
1983	They're Playing Our Song	Voice of Sonia Walsk	Birmingham Theatre
1985	Hamelin	Gilda	Circle in the Square Downtown, Off-Broadway
1985	Kuni-Leml	Carolina/Libe	Birmingham Theatre
1985	Personals	Kim (Replacement)	Minetta Lane Theatre, Off-Broadway
1987	Company	Marta	York Theatre, Off-Broadway
1987	Some Enchanted Evening: The Music of Rodgers and Hammerstein	Various	Coconut Grove Playhouse
1988	Girl Crazy	Molly Gray	Birmingham Theatre
1989	Rhythm Ranch	Various	Paper Mill Playhouse
1989	Starmites	Bizarbara/Eleanor	Criterion Center Stage Right, Broadway
1992	The Most Happy Fella	Cleo	Booth Theatre, Broadway
1993	The Loman Family Picnic	Aunt Marsha	Manhattan Theatre Club, Off-Broadway
1994	Teibele and Her Demon	Genendel	Jewish Repertory Theatre, Off-Broadway
1994	Damn Yankees	Gloria Thorpe (Replacement)	Marquis Theatre, Broadway
1994	Evita	Eva Perón	Casa Mañana
1996	Du Barry Was a Lady	Alice Barton/Mme La Marquise Alisande De Vernay	New York City Center, Off-Broadway
1997	Sunday in the Park with George	Dot/Marie	Arena Stage
1998	A New Brain	Rhoda	Lincoln Center Theater, Off-Broadway
1999	Little by Little	Woman 1	Theater at St. Peter's Church, Off-Broadway
2000	The Rocky Horror Show	Columbia (Replacement)	Circle in the Square Theatre, Broadway
2001	Newyorkers	Various	Manhattan Theatre Club, Off-Broadway
2001	Joseph and the Amazing Technicolor Dreamcoat	Narrator	North Shore Music Theatre
2002	The Smell of the Kill	Debra (Understudy)/Molly (Understudy)/Nicky (Understudy)	Helen Hayes Theater, Broadway
2002	Hairspray	Velma Von Tussle (Replacement)	Neil Simon Theatre, Broadway
2005	Annie Get Your Gun	Annie Oakley	The Muny
2005	Bingo! The Winning Musical	Honey	St. Luke's Theatre, Off-Broadway
2006	The Value of Names	Norma	George Street Playhouse
2007	Falsettos	Trina	George Street Playhouse
2008	The Jerusalem Syndrome	Phyllis	37 Arts Theatre B, Off-Broadway
2009	Guys and Dolls	Miss Adelaide	Ogunquit Playhouse
2009	F#@king Up Everything	Arielle	45th Street Theatre, Off-Broaday
2009	Sessions	Mrs. Murphy	Algonquin Theater
2010	Radio Girl	Melva	Goodspeed Musicals
2010	My Mother's Lesbian Jewish Wiccan Wedding	Claire	Barrow Street Theatre, Off-Broadway
2011	Renovations	Various	White Plains Performing Arts Center
2011	Hello Out There	Wendy Eikenberry	Adirondack Theatre Festival
2012	Soul Doctor	Mother	Colony Theatre
2012	The Odd Couple	Gwendolyn Pigeon	Connecticut Repertory Theatre
2013	Rich Girl	Maggie	George Street Playhouse
2013	The Drowsy Chaperone	The Drowsy Chaperone	Connecticut Repertory Theatre
2014	Beautiful: The Carole King Musical	Genie Klein	Stephen Sondheim Theatre, Broadway
2015	Les Misérables	Madame Thénardier	Connecticut Repertory Theatre
2018	Sweeney Todd: The Demon Barber of Fleet Street	Mrs. Lovett	Connecticut Repertory Theatre
2019	The Flamingo Kid	Ruth	Hartford Stage
2022	Our Brother's Son	Mindy	Pershing Square Signature Center
2023	Sunday in the Park with George	Old Lady/Blair	Pasadena Playhouse
2023	A Transparent Musical	Shelley Pfefferman	Mark Taper Forum
2025	The Bedwetter	Nana	Arena Stage
2025	The Reservoir	Beverly	Geffen Playhouse
2026	Birthright	Deborah	MCC Theater, Off-Broadway
