= Jessica Earnshaw =

American director

- Born: Vancouver Island
- Occupation(s): Director, cinematographer, photographer
- Years active: 2011–present

Jessica Earnshaw is a Canadian American-based documentary film director and photographer. She has directed and produced Jacinta (2020) and Baby Doe (2025). As a photographer, her work has been featured in The Wall Street Journal, The New York Times, Mother Jones, The Marshall Project, National Geographic and NPR.

== Early life ==
Earnshaw was born on Vancouver Island. She attended International Center of Photography.

== Career ==
Earnshaw worked as a junior photo editor for Time.

As a photographer, Earnshaw's work has been featured in The New York Times focusing on a children's prom at Montefiore Einstein Medical Center, The Wall Street Journal focusing on Coachella in 2015 and 2016, NPR focusing on women in prison, The Marshall Project and Mother Jones focusing on life after prison. and National Geographic focusing on aging inmates. She also worked as a photographer for Vancouver Magazine.

As a documentarian, Earnshaw has directed Jacinta which focuses on a mother and daughter being incarcerated together. The film was released in October 2021, by ABC News Studios and Hulu.

In 2025, Earnshaw directed and produced Baby Doe focusing on Gail Ritchey as her life becomes shattered when DNA evidence links her to the death of her child thirty years prior. It had its world premiere at South by Southwest in March 2025.
