= David Black (photographer) =

American photographer and director

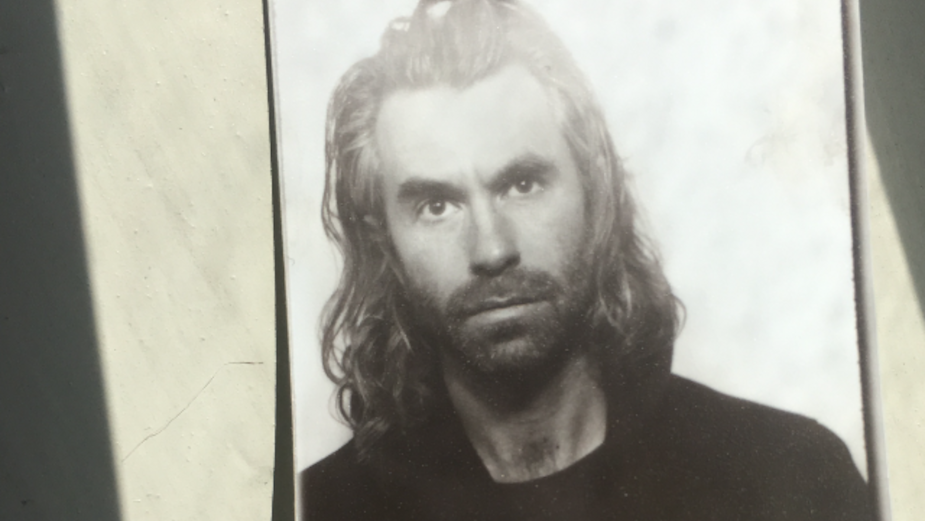
David Black

David Black is a fine artist known for his raw, energetic cinematic style sometimes referred to as Western noir.

== Career ==
Black has published three monographs: Candy Mountain (2021), The Days Change at Night (2017), and Cerro Gordo (2016). These works have served as origin points for partnerships with brands, fashion designers, gallerists, and musicians, using his artistic work as a reference for iconography.

As creative director for Dua Lipa, his work spanned the full visual rebrand for the artist’s global Radical Optimism tour, including show direction, scenic design, tour visuals, and promotional materials.

The tour gained critical acclaim, selling out arenas quickly, including four sold out nights at Wembley Stadium. Rolling Stone called it “a stunning exercise in grand-scale staging,” noting that “the entire spectacle is as visually ambitious as anything in the history of showbiz.” Variety noted the four sold-out dates in Los Angeles were “yet another testament to how singular she remains in the ever-changing pop landscape.”

The stage design received coverage for its "elevated platform reminiscent of the shape of an infinity sign, a runway leading to a pseudo-B-stage that lit up in flames... and a floating platform that carried her to the arena’s 100-level seating." And for how it “embraced the “Optimism” aesthetic with the set, designed like a cresting wave to mirror her much-discussed album cover, and punctuated the most explosive moments ... with jettisons of confetti.” Overall, the tour earned US$141.1 million within its first 59 concerts, thus becoming the highest-grossing tour of the singer to date, according to sales reports provided by Billboard.

In earlier years, Black’s collaboration with Daft Punk began with their experimental feature film Electroma. Subsequently, Daft Punk commissioned Black to produce the visuals for their final album, Random Access Memories. The band continued to collaborate with Black for the album's promotional merchandise, including books, a limited-edition box set, and launch film.

The Yeah Yeah Yeahs initially collaborated with Black to create the visual approach for their comeback album “Cool It Down” after nearly a decade-long hiatus. Black also directed the music video for “Black Top,” a single off their Grammy-nominated album. Capping off their reunion tour at the Hollywood Bowl, the band tapped Black to direct a film documenting that day and the journey to get there.

Black has exhibited his work at OFR Paris, Aperture NYC, One Trick Pony LA, and the Lodge.

== Personal life ==
David currently splits his time between Los Angeles and Paris.
