= Zosia Mamet =

American actress (born 1988)

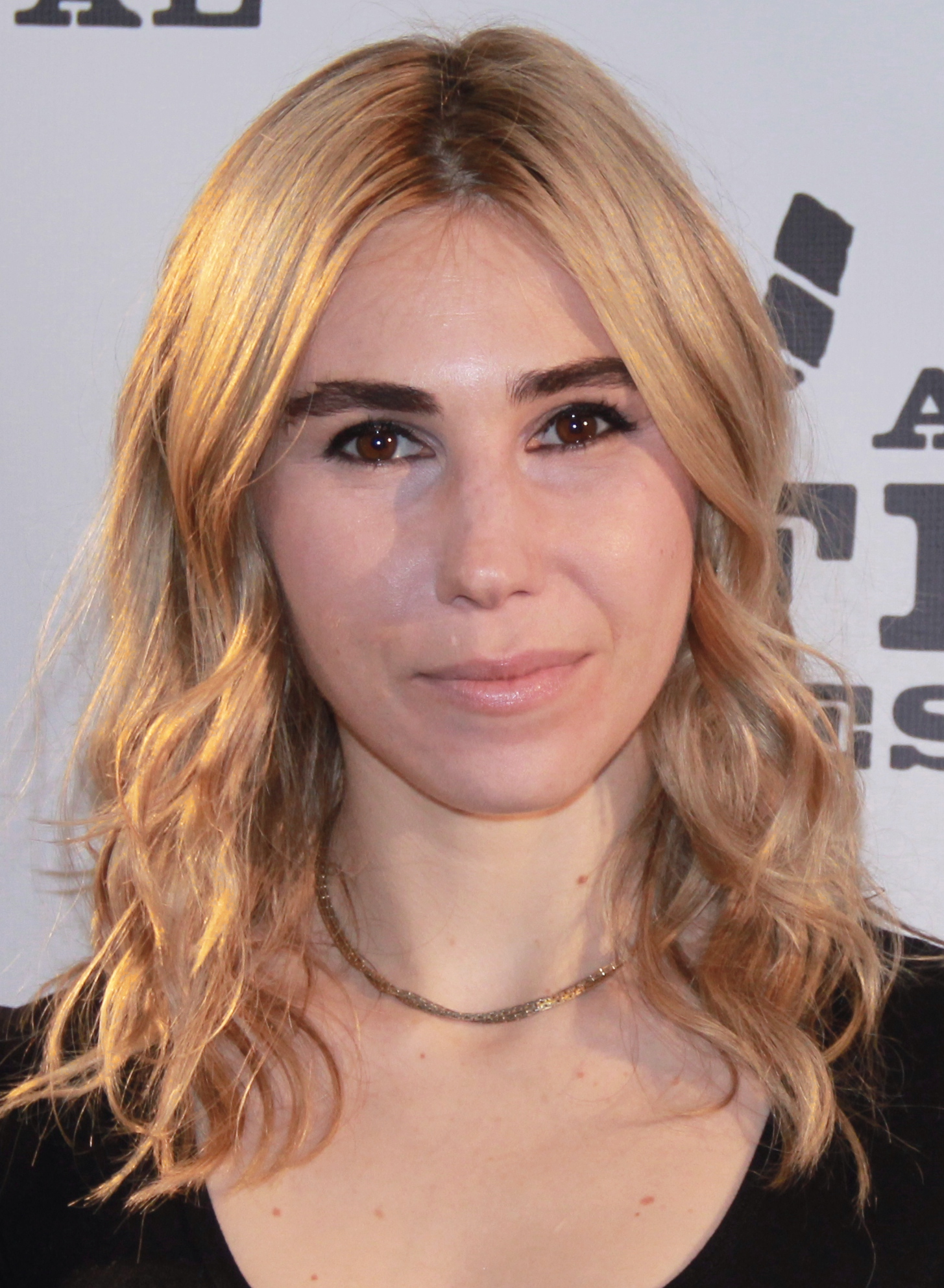
- Mamet at the 2016 Austin Film Festival
- Born: February 2, 1988 (age 38); Randolph, Vermont, U.S.
- Occupation: Actress
- Years active: 1994–present
- Spouse: Evan Jonigkeit (m. 2016)
- Parent(s): David Mamet; Lindsay Crouse
- Relatives: Clara Mamet (half-sister); Russel Crouse (grandfather); Timothy Crouse (uncle); John Erskine (great-grandfather)

Zosia Mamet (/ˈzɒʃə ˈmæmɪt/ ZOSH-ə MAM-it; born February 2, 1988) is an American actress and musician. She is known for her breakout role as Shoshanna Shapiro in the HBO series Girls.

Mamet also starred as Annie Mouradian in the HBO Max original series The Flight Attendant and Pampinea in the Netflix series The Decameron.

== Early life ==
Mamet is the daughter of American playwright, essayist, screenwriter, and film director David Mamet and actress Lindsay Crouse. Her father is the grandson of Polish Jews and she says her given name is Polish and Russian. Her maternal grandfather was playwright Russel Crouse and her maternal great-grandfather was educator John Erskine. She has a sister, Willa, who is a singer, and two half-siblings: Clara, also an actress and director; and Noah. She lived in New England until age five when her mother moved to Pacific Palisades, California, with Willa and Zosia. After finishing high school, Mamet decided to pursue acting instead of going to college.

== Career ==
In 2012, Mamet was cast by Judd Apatow in the HBO series Girls. She has subsequently appeared as a regular in television series such as The Flight Attendant, The Decameron, and Laid. In June of 2026, Mamet was announced to have a guest appearance in the upcoming season 2 of Adults.

=== Voice acting ===
Mamet performed the audiobook The Feral Detective by author Jonathan Lethem. Mamet has also done voice-over work in Regular Show, High School USA!, Star vs. the Forces of Evil, and StuGo.

=== Music ===
In 2012, alongside her half-sister Clara Mamet, launched a folk music duo project called The Cabin Sisters. In April, they played live in The Bowery Electric in New York City.

In 2014, Mamet formed an alternative rock band called Chacha, the band's name originating from a childhood nickname of Mamet's. In December, the band performed their first show in The Manderley Bar at The McKittrick Hotel to promote their new lead single "Too Good", off their upcoming EP, Lucy.

== Personal life ==
Mamet began dating actor Evan Jonigkeit in 2013. They married in October 2016.

At the 2017 Makers Conference, Mamet performed a monologue describing her experience of living with undiagnosed pelvic floor dysfunction for six years. They announced their separation on November 20, 2026 after 10 years of marriage. 17

== Filmography ==
=== Film ===
Year	Title	Role	Notes
1997	Colin Fitz Lives!	Lost Fan	
2004	Spartan	Bedouin Woman	
2009	Half Truth	Girl	Short film
2009	Off the Ledge	Jenny	
2010	The Kids Are All Right	Sasha	
2010	Cherry	Darcy	
2010	Greenberg	Girl at Party	
2011	Snuggle Bunny: Man's Most Lovable Predator	The Daughter	Short film
2012	Sunset Stories	Bethany	
2012	Rhymes with Banana	Z	
2013	The Last Keepers	Rhea Carver	
2015	Bleeding Heart	Shiva	
2016	Wiener-Dog	Zoe	
2016	Mildred & The Dying Parlor	Mildred	Short film
2016	Dominion	Penny	
2016	Goldbricks in Bloom	Cleo	
2017	The Boy Downstairs	Diana	
2018	Under the Silver Lake	Troy	
2022	Alone Together	Margaret	
2023	Molli and Max in the Future	Molli	
2023	Trolls Band Together	Crimp (voice)	
2024	Madame Web	Amaria	
2025	Fantasy Life	Jenny	
2026	All That She Wants	TBA	Post-production
2026	Artificial	TBA	Post-production
TBA	Goodbye Girl	TBA	Filming

=== Television ===
Year	Title	Role	Notes
1994	Parallel Lives	Shannon	Television film
2006–2007	The Unit	Christine Ross	5 episodes
2009	Ab Fab	Saffron	Television film
2009	War Wolves	Rudy	Television film
2010	United States of Tara	Courtney	7 episodes
2010	Miss USA's Sexy Halloween	Beatrice	Video short
2010–2011	Parenthood	Kelsey	5 episodes
2010–2012	Mad Men	Joyce Ramsay	5 episodes
2012–2017	Girls	Shoshanna Shapiro	Main role; 48 episodes
2013	High School USA!	Amber Lamber (voice)	Main role
2014–2015	Regular Show	Celia (voice)	2 episodes
2014	Back to Backspace	Yaga (voice)	Television pilot
2015	American Dad!	Mary (voice)	Episode: "My Affair Lady"
2016	Once Upon a Sesame Street Christmas	Bella	HBO special
2016, 2018	Unbreakable Kimmy Schmidt	Sue Thompstein	2 episodes
2016–2019	Star vs. the Forces of Evil	Hekapoo (voice)	18 episodes
2017	You're the Worst	Heidi Rasmullen	Episode: "Not a Great Bet"
2019	Tales of the City	Claire Duncan	Recurring role; 6 episodes
2019	Stumptown	Kaytlin / Kendra / Katrina	Episode: "Missed Connections"
2019–2021	Dickinson	Louisa May Alcott	2 episodes
2020–2022	The Flight Attendant	Annie Mouradian	Main role; 16 episodes
2021	The Other Two	Herself	Episode: "Chase Goes to College"
2023	Ten Year Old Tom	Greenpeace Lisa (voice)	3 episodes
2023	Harley Quinn	Princess Ladyfingers (voice)	Episode: "The Most Culturally Impactful Film Franchise of All Time"
2024	The Decameron	Pampinea	8 episodes
2024	Laid	AJ	Main role
2025	StuGo	Merian (voice)	Main role
2026	Chibiverse	Merian (voice)	Episode: "Star Butterfly Effect"
2026	Adults	Nina Adler	Episode: "Vote for Paul Baker"

=== Theatre ===
Year	Title	Role	Playwright	Venue	Ref.
2013	Really Really	Leigh	Paul Downs Colaizzo	Lucille Lortel Theatre, Off-Broadway	
2013	Uncle Vanya	Sofia	Anton Chekhov	James Bridges Theater, Los Angeles	
2013	Crimes of the Heart	Babe Botrelle	Beth Henley	Acorn Theatre, Off-Broadway	
2017	The Whirligig	Trish	Hamish Linklater	Alice Griffin Jewel Box Theatre, Off-Broadway	

== Awards and nominations ==
Year	Association	Category	Project	Result	Ref.
2017	Online Film & Television Association Award	Best Supporting Actress in a Comedy Series	Girls	Nominated	
2021	Screen Actors Guild Award	Outstanding Ensemble in a Comedy Series	The Flight Attendant	Nominated	
