= One Percent More Humid =

- Film poster
- Directed by: Liz W. Garcia
- Written by: Liz W. Garcia
- Produced by: Liz W. Garcia; Joshua Harto; Isaac Lefevre; Red Sanders
- Starring: Juno Temple; Julia Garner; Alessandro Nivola; Maggie Siff; Olivia Luccardi; Philip Ettinger
- Cinematography: Andreas Burgess
- Edited by: Sam Adelman; Elizabeth Kling
- Music by: Nathan Halpern
- Production companies: La Pistola; Red Entertainment
- Release date: April 21, 2017 (Tribeca Film Festival)
- Running time: 98 minutes
- Country: United States
- Language: English

One Percent More Humid is a 2017 American drama film written and directed by Liz W. Garcia. The film stars Juno Temple, Julia Garner, Alessandro Nivola, Maggie Siff, Olivia Luccardi and Philip Ettinger.

== Plot ==
Catherine and Iris, who were childhood friends, are returning home from college to a hot and humid summer in upstate New York. They’re filling their days and nights with parties, skinny-dipping and rekindling old relationships. But when a shared trauma from their past becomes increasingly difficult to suppress, a wedge between the two grows, and each begin to pursue forbidden love affairs.

== Cast ==
- Juno Temple as Iris
- Julia Garner as Catherine
- Alessandro Nivola as Gerald
- Maggie Siff as Lisette
- Olivia Luccardi as Mae
- Philip Ettinger as Billy
- Mamoudou Athie as Jack
- Liz Larsen as Catherine's Mother
- Jack DiFalco as Reynolds
- Ricky Goldman as Alex

== Release ==
The film premiered at the Tribeca Film Festival on April 21, 2017.
