= Rich Girl (play) =

2013 play by Victoria Stewart

- Written by: Victoria Stewart
- Subject: "Women and their relationship to men, mothers and money, in that order."
- Genre: Dramatic comedy
- Setting: The present, Manhattan, especially Eve's apartment on Central Park West.

Premiere
- Date: March 12, 2013
- Place: George Street Playhouse, New Brunswick, NJ

Rich Girl is a play by Victoria Stewart, which updates Henry James's 1880 novel Washington Square to the present.

== Plot ==
Playwright Stewart retains novelist James's plot structure essentially intact but updates the characters:

- James's Catherine Sloper becomes Stewart's Claudine, an insecure, plain-looking young woman.
- Dr. Sloper becomes Eve Walker, Claudine's bitter, divorced mother, a wealthy TV financial wizard, who is grooming Claudine to take over her position as head of a philanthropic foundation.
- Morris Townsend becomes Henry, Claudine's handsome beau, an avant-garde theatre director who is deeply in debt.
- Lavinia Penniman becomes Maggie, Eve's personal assistant and confidante.

The tone of the first act is light comedy as Henry courts Claudine and asks her to marry him. The second act turns dramatic as Eve, believing Henry is interested in Claudine only for her money, threatens to disinherit her if she marries him. In her insecurity Claudine believes he is her only chance for love and happiness. When Henry then leaves her, Claudine is heartbroken and becomes embittered but self-confident.

== Notable productions ==
The world premiere production played at the George Street Playhouse in New Brunswick, NJ from March 12 – April 7, 2013 and at the Cleveland Play House from April 19 – May 12. It cast Crystal Finn as Claudine, Dee Hoty as Eve, Tony Roach as Henry, and Liz Larsen as Maggie, with direction by Michael Bloom, the artistic director of the Cleveland Play House.

The west coast premiere was at the Old Globe Theatre in San Diego from May 23 – June 21, 2015.
