= Domino Kirke =

British-American singer (born 1983)

- Born: Domino Suzy Kirke; 1983 (age 42–43); London, England
- Occupation: Singer
- Years active: 2006–present
- Spouse: Penn Badgley (m. 2017)
- Children: 4
- Father: Simon Kirke
- Relatives: Jemima Kirke (younger sister); Lola Kirke (younger sister); Jack Dellal (maternal grandfather); Alice Dellal (cousin); Charlotte Olympia Dellal (cousin); Gaby Dellal (maternal aunt); Jasmine Dellal (maternal aunt); Harley Viera-Newton (cousin); Elisa Sednaoui (cousin-in-law)
- Website: https://www.dominokirke.com/

Domino Suzy Kirke-Badgley (born 1983) is a British-American singer and doula.

== Early life and education ==
She was born into an upper class British family in London as the eldest daughter of Simon Kirke and Lorraine Dellal. The Kirke family is a junior branch of a Nottinghamshire landed gentry family and also descends from the Gibson-Craig baronets. Her maternal grandfather was billionaire Jack Dellal and her maternal grandmother Zehava Helmer moved to Israel in the early years of the foundation of the state. Kirke has two younger sisters Lola Kirke and Jemima Kirke. Her maternal aunts include Jasmine Dellal and Gaby Dellal. Her maternal cousins include Charlotte Olympia Dellal, Alice Dellal, and Harley Viera-Newton. Elisa Sednaoui is her cousin-in-law.

Kirke sang in choirs and started taking classical voice and piano lessons from the age of six. She began writing music when she was about eleven, and always had recording studios in her home growing up due to her dad's professional music career. In the mid 1990s, she moved to New York City with her family and graduated from Fiorello H. LaGuardia High School. In 2004, her mother founded the Geminola boutique in New York City.

Kirke is named after Domino Harvey, whom her mother met when Harvey was a young girl.

== Career ==
After being spotted at a Joe's Pub performance at age 17 by producer Andres Levin, Kirke was signed to his label, Fun Machine. Shortly thereafter, she joined forces with Jordan Galland, and formed the band DOMINO, which recorded an EP with Mark Ronson and toured for three years with the likes of Gang of Four and Lily Allen. The band was also featured in Lena Dunham's indie movie Tiny Furniture. The video for their song "Green Umbrella", directed by Galland, won Best Musical Form at the 2006 Da Vinci Film and Video Festival.

In 2017, Kirke released her first solo EP called “Beyond Waves”. In 2021 she released an emotional single called “Mercy” about her miscarriage. Domino became a birth doula around 2009 and co-founded a doula business collective, Carriage House Birth. And founded the Grand-street healing project. In November 2021, along with entrepreneur Joanna Griffiths, Kirke released Life After Birth: Portraits of Love and the Beauty of Parenthood, a book about the experiences of postpartum mothers.

== Personal life ==
In 2009, Kirke gave birth to a son with musician Morgan O'Kane. In 2014, she began a relationship with actor and musician Penn Badgley. They married in a New York courthouse on 27 February 2017. In February 2020, Kirke and Badgley announced they were expecting their first child together. Their son was born in August 2020.

On February 28, 2025, Domino announced on Instagram that they are expecting twins due in summer 2025.

== Discography ==
- Everyone Else Is Boring EP (2006)
- Mark Ronson Presents Hard Rock compilation (2007)
- Adults Only (2010)
- The Guard EP (2012)
- Beyond Waves (2017)
