= Jemima Kirke =

British-American actress (born 1985)

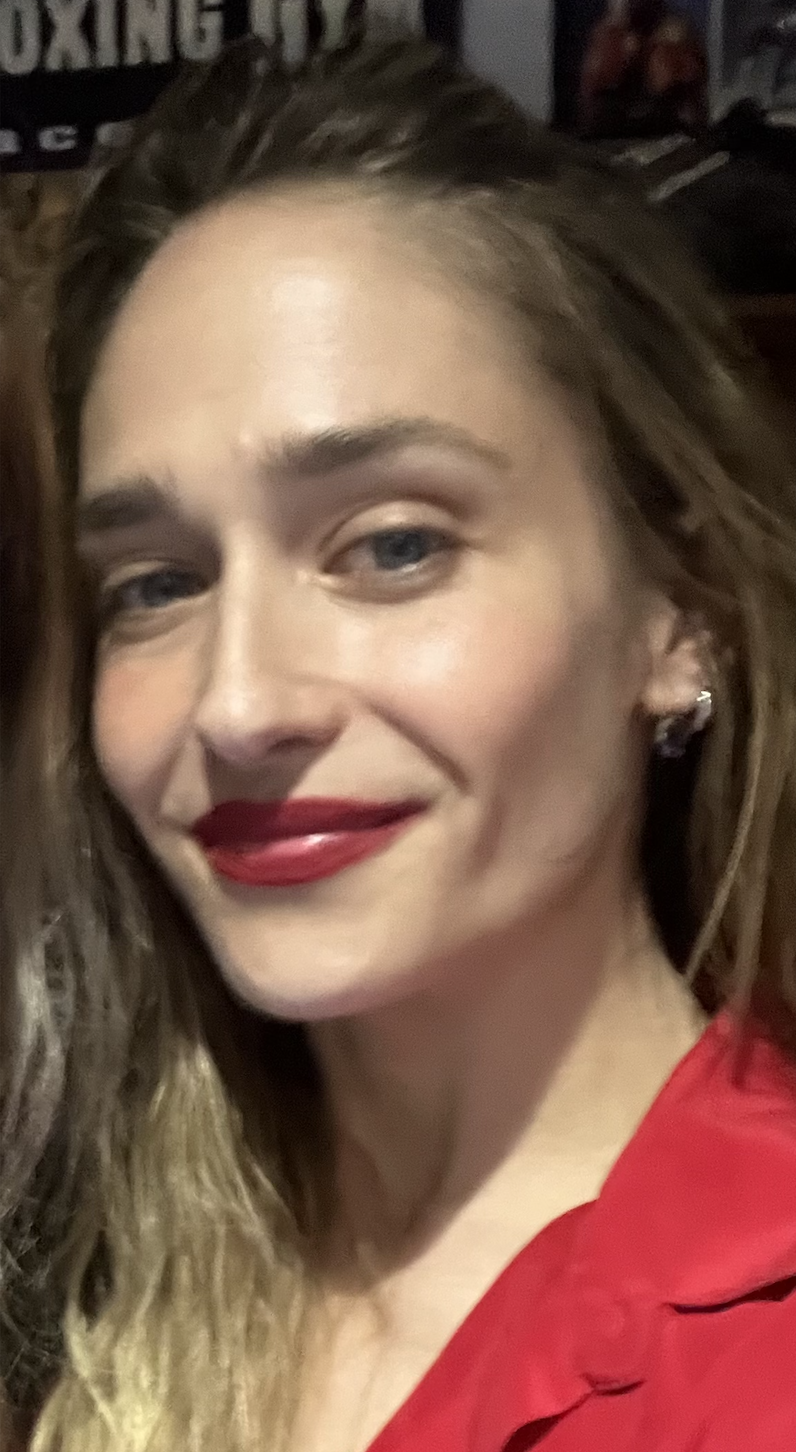
- Kirke in 2023
- Born: Jemima Jo Kirke; 26 April 1985 (age 41); London, England
- Citizenship: United Kingdom; United States
- Education: Rhode Island School of Design (BFA)
- Occupations: Actress; artist; director
- Years active: 2005–present
- Partner: Michael Mosberg (2009–2017)
- Children: 2
- Father: Simon Kirke
- Relatives: Lola Kirke (younger sister); Domino Kirke (older sister); Jack Dellal (maternal grandfather); Alice Dellal (cousin); Charlotte Olympia Dellal (cousin); Gaby Dellal (maternal aunt); Jasmine Dellal (maternal aunt); Harley Viera-Newton (cousin); Penn Badgley (brother-in-law); Elisa Sednaoui (cousin-in-law)

Jemima Jo Kirke (born 26 April 1985) is a British-American artist, actress and director. She gained international acclaim through her role as Jessa Johansson in the 2012 HBO series Girls. She made her film debut in the 2005 indie short Smile for the Camera and her feature-length debut in Tiny Furniture (2010), as a favour for her childhood friend Lena Dunham.

== Early life and family ==
Born in London on 26 April 1985, Jemima Kirke moved to New York when she was 11 years old and was then raised in New York City. She is the daughter of Simon Kirke, the former drummer of the rock bands Bad Company and Free. Her mother is Lorraine Kirke (née Dellal), the owner of Geminola, a vintage boutique in New York City that supplied a number of outfits for the television series Sex and the City. Her character Jessa wore a wedding dress from Geminola in the season finale of the first season of Girls; also, earlier in her career, she was featured along with her sisters in a fashion piece in Teen Vogue in which they wore clothing from the store.

Her father is of English and Scottish descent (the Kirkes being a junior branch of a family of Nottinghamshire landed gentry and descending also from the Gibson-Craig baronets) and her mother is Jewish. Kirke's maternal grandfather, Jack Dellal, was a billionaire and British businessman of Iraqi-Jewish descent and her maternal grandmother, Zehava Helmer, was an Israeli flight attendant for El Al. Kirke has two sisters, actress Lola Kirke and singer and actress Domino Kirke. She is a cousin of curator Alexander Dellal, shoe designer Charlotte Olympia Dellal and model/photographer Alice Dellal. Elisa Sednaoui is her cousin-in-law.

== Career ==
=== Art ===
Jemima Kirke majored in art as a student and received her Bachelor of Fine Arts in painting from the Rhode Island School of Design in 2008. In late 2011, she held an exhibition titled "A Brief History" through Skylight Projects. In late 2017 to early 2018, she had a show at Sargent's Daughters, a Lower East Side gallery, where she exhibited portrait-style paintings, some of them neck-up, others full-figure, of women in their wedding dresses. Kirke was inspired by her own divorce and the exhibition also contained a self-portrait of Kirke in her wedding dress and veil. In 2019 she opened a solo show called “SCAMP” at Sargeant's Daughters gallery.

In September 2022, Kirke presented for Batsheva Hay's spring collection at Ben's Kosher Deli.

=== Acting ===
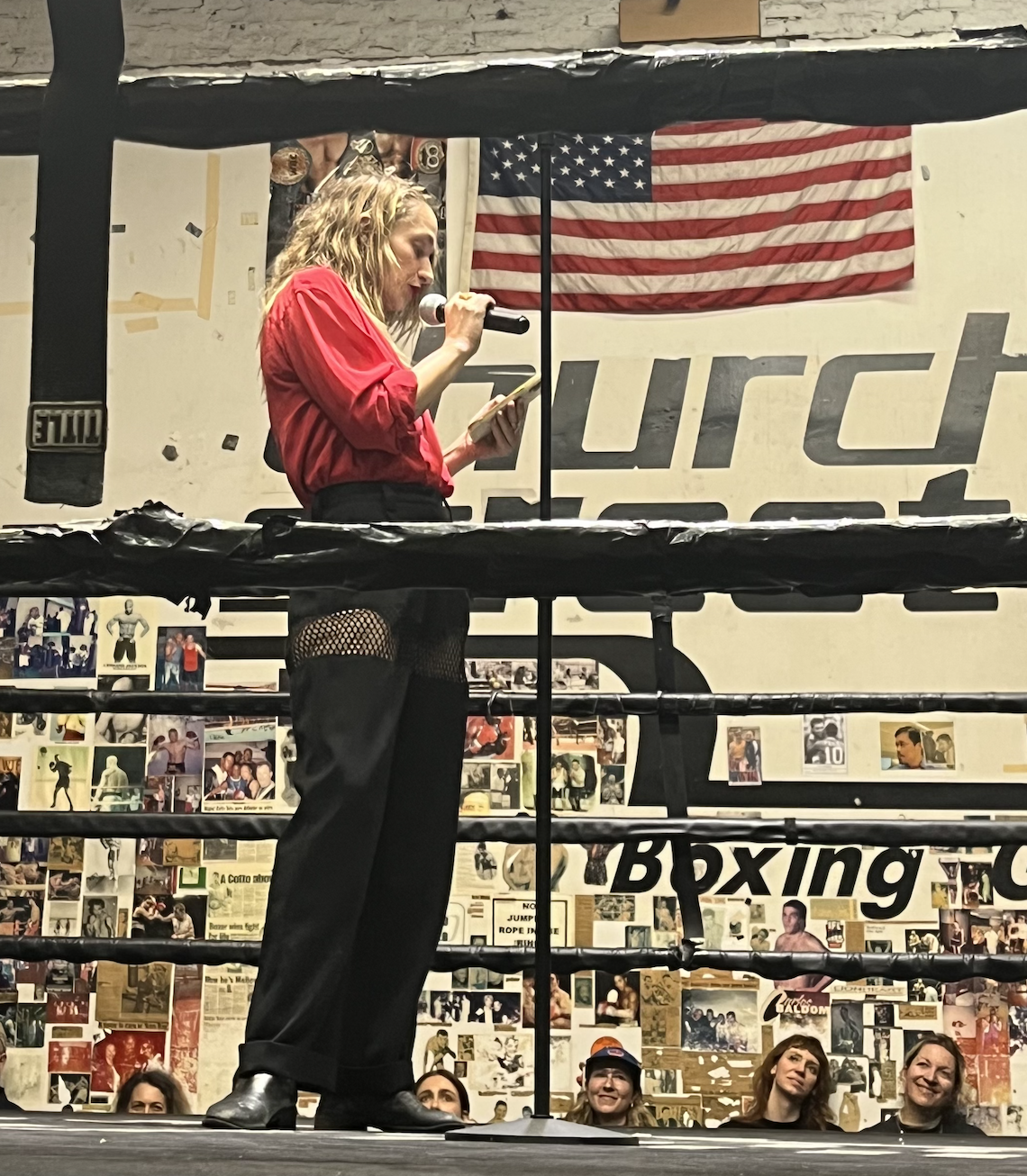
Kirke reading poetry in New York City in 2023

Growing up in the West Village, Kirke found herself accepting a number of roles on her friends' projects. Dunham asked Kirke to take on a supporting role in her debut film Tiny Furniture. Kirke and a number of other friends were called upon as a favour to Dunham since there was not enough money to pay professional actors. Although the film turned out to be profitable, Kirke received no payment. Kirke reunited with Dunham in the HBO series Girls, appearing in all six seasons from 2011 to 2017 as the character Jessa Johansson. Kirke next had supporting roles in the dark comedy films Ava's Possessions and The Little Hours. In 2018, Kirke starred alongside her real-life sister Lola Kirke in Emma Forrest's film Untogether. The film premiered at the 2018 Tribeca Film Festival.

In 2011, Kirke appeared in the music video "Wring It Out" for the group Rival Schools. Both this music video and Smile for the Camera were directed by her friend Jordan Galland. In 2017, she appeared in the music video for "Gotta Get a Grip" by Mick Jagger, directed by Saam Farahmand and appeared opposite Alex Cameron in his music video for the song "Stranger's Kiss". In September 2017, Kirke appeared opposite Zayn Malik in his music video for the song "Dusk Till Dawn".

In 2021, Kirke appeared in the Netflix series Sex Education in the role of Hope, headmistress of Moordale Secondary School. In 2021, it was announced that Kirke had accepted a role in Conversations with Friends, a series based on the book of the same name by Sally Rooney, in which she plays Melissa, an older, experienced writer fascinated by a younger couple. In 2023, Kirke starred in the Apple TV+ series City on Fire, based on the book of the same name.

=== Directing ===
Kirke's directorial debut was in 2019 when she spearheaded the video for the track "Mama" by her sister Lola Kirke. She would go on to direct other projects including multiple music videos and a short film with Alex Cameron.

=== Activism ===
In 2015, Kirke partnered with the Center for Reproductive Rights to create a public service announcement to advance the future of reproductive healthcare. In the PSA, Kirke discusses the abortion she received in college where she could not afford the anesthesia in addition to the procedure and went without.

== Personal life ==
Kirke resides in Brooklyn, New York and East Hampton (town). Kirke has two children from her former relationship with lawyer Michael Mosberg that began in 2009 and ended in 2017. Kirke began a relationship with Australian musician and singer songwriter Alex Cameron in July 2017. Cameron has said that his 2019 album Miami Memory is primarily influenced by his relationship with Kirke. The couple has since separated. In an interview from 2024, Kirke stated that she has never been married to her former partners but instead referred to them as her "husbands" despite not being legally married to them.

Kirke is close friends with Lena Dunham, the creator of Tiny Furniture and Girls. They became friends while attending Saint Ann's School in New York City. Kirke's brother-in-law is actor Penn Badgley, through her sister Domino.

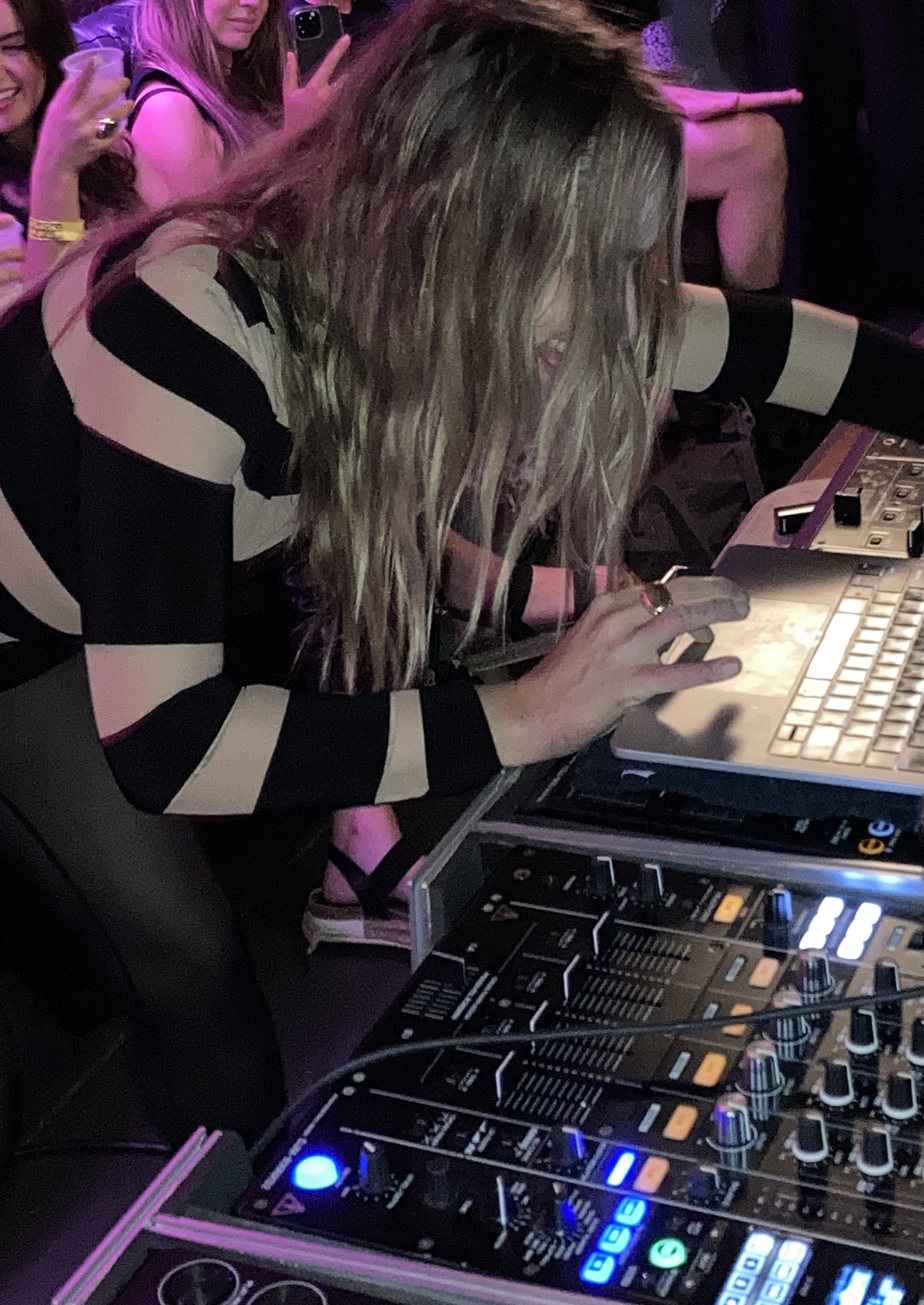
Kirke's DJ set for sister Lola's VIP 2023 event in Manhattan.

== Filmography ==
=== Film ===
Year	Title	Role	Notes
2005	Smile for the Camera	Twin Singer (voice)	Short film
2010	Tiny Furniture	Charlotte	
2015	Ava's Possessions	Ivy	
2017	The Little Hours	Marta	
2018	Wild Honey Pie	Gillian	
2018	Untogether	Andrea Moore	
2018	All These Small Moments	Odessa	
2020	Sylvie's Love	Countess	

=== Television ===
Year	Title	Role	Notes
2012–2017	Girls	Jessa Johansson	Main role; 53 episodes
2015	Axe Cop	Water Queen (voice)	Episode: "The Center of the Ocean"
2015	The Simpsons	Candace's Friend (voice)	Episode: "Every Man's Dream"
2018	Maniac	Adelaide	Miniseries; 5 episodes
2019	High Maintenance	Herself	Episode: "Breathwork"
2021	Sex Education	Hope Haddon	Main role, Season 3; 8 episodes
2022	Conversations with Friends	Melissa	Main role; 12 episodes
2023	City on Fire	Regan Hamilton Sweeney	Main role; 8 episodes
2025	Law & Order: Special Victims Unit	Claire Morgan	Episode: "False Idols"
2026	Elsbeth	Summer Redgrave	Episode: "Consciously Unsistered"

=== Music videos ===
Year	Title	Artist(s)	Notes
2017	"Dusk Till Dawn"	Zayn featuring Sia	
2017	"Stranger's Kiss"	Alex Cameron (duet with Angel Olsen)	
2018	"Studmuffin96"	Alex Cameron	director
2019	"Marlon Brando"	Alex Cameron	director
2019	"Miami Memory"	Alex Cameron	
2022	"Best Life"	Alex Cameron	director
