= Lola Kirke =

American actress and singer (born 1990)

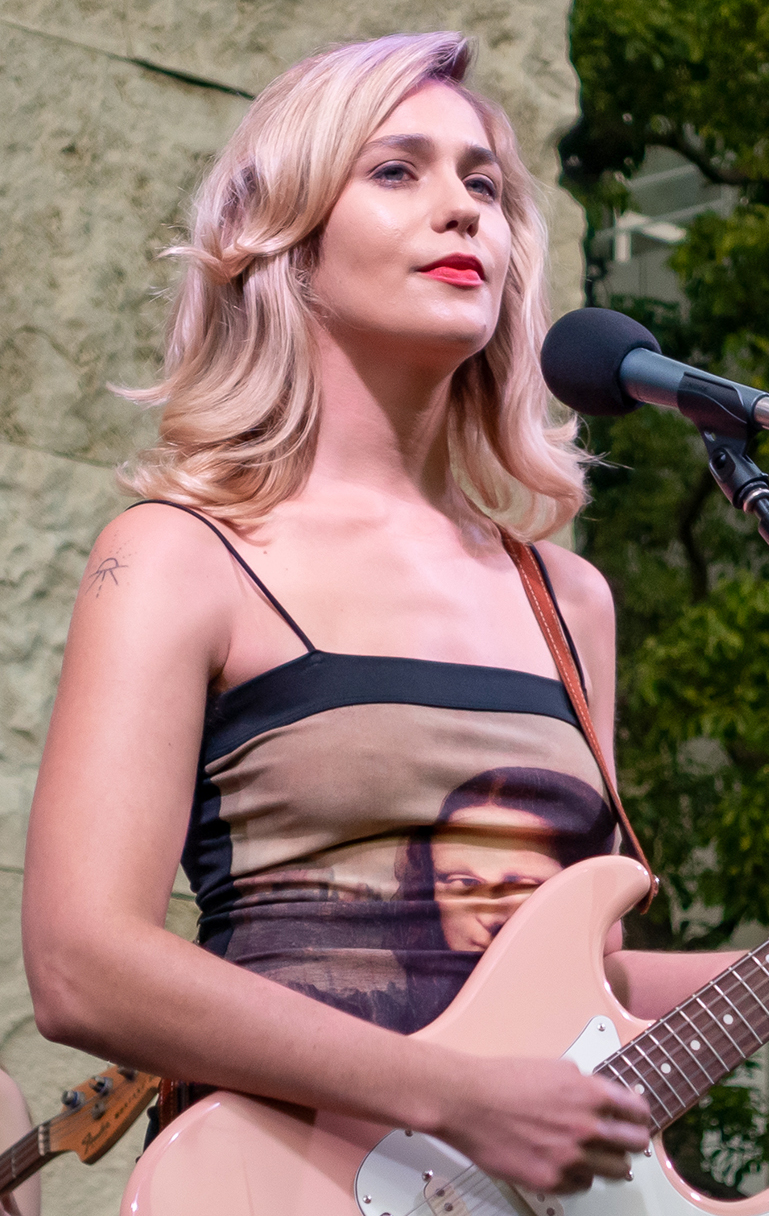
- Kirke in 2018
- Born: September 27, 1990 (age 36); London, England
- Citizenship: US; UK
- Education: Bard College
- Occupations: Actress; singer; author
- Years active: 2010–present
- Father: Simon Kirke
- Relatives: Jemima Kirke (sister); Domino Kirke (sister); Penn Badgley (brother-in-law); Jack Dellal (grandfather); Gaby Dellal (aunt); Jasmine Dellal (aunt); Harley Viera-Newton (cousin); Charlotte Olympia Dellal (cousin); Alice Dellal (cousin); Elisa Sednaoui (cousin-in-law)

Lola Kirke (born September 27, 1990) is an American actress, singer, and author. She was born in London and raised in New York City. Kirke starred in the comedy film Mistress America (2015) and the Amazon Studios television series Mozart in the Jungle (2014–2018). She also appeared in the films Gone Girl (2014), Gemini (2017), Lost Girls (2020) and Sinners (2025), among others. Kirke began her singing career in 2016. Simon & Schuster published her debut book, Wild West Village, in 2025.

== Early life and family ==
Kirke was born on September 27, 1990, at the Portland Hospital in London. Her father, Simon Kirke, is a musician who was drummer for the rock bands Bad Company and Free, while her mother, Lorraine (née Dellal), is a fashion designer. Simon is of English and Scottish descent. (Note: The Kirkes are a junior branch of a family of Nottinghamshire landed gentry. They are also descended from the Gibson-Craig baronets.) Lorraine's father, Jack Dellal, was a British businessman of Iraqi-Jewish descent, and her mother, Zehava Helmer, was an Israeli flight attendant; Kirke has described herself as Jewish. The youngest of four children, she has two sisters, singer Domino Kirke and actress Jemima Kirke, and a brother, Gregory Kirke. Her maternal aunts include filmmakers Jasmine and Gaby Dellal. Kirke is a cousin of curator Alexander Dellal, shoe designer Charlotte Olympia Dellal, and model Alice Dellal. Model and actress Elisa Sednaoui is her cousin-in-law.

The family lived in Barnes, London, before moving to New York City when Kirke was five years old. She grew up in West Village, Manhattan, where Lorraine founded and owned Geminola, a vintage boutique. Kirke is a naturalized US citizen. She graduated from Saint Ann's School and, in 2012, from Bard College.

== Career ==
Kirke's breakout role came as the main character Hayley Rutledge in the Amazon series Mozart in the Jungle. It ran for four seasons, from 2014 to 2018. In 2014, she had a supporting role in the David Fincher film Gone Girl, before going on to star in Mistress America alongside Greta Gerwig. In 2017, Kirke starred opposite Zoe Kravitz in the Neon film Gemini, a neo-noir mystery film set in Hollywood, which made its world premiere at South By Southwest on March 12, 2017. Additionally in 2017, Kirke appeared in the based-on-a-true-story action comedy film American Made alongside actors Tom Cruise, Jesse Plemons and Domhnall Gleeson. In 2018 she starred in the drama film Untogether, playing sisters with her real-life sister Jemima Kirke. It premiered at the 2018 Tribeca Film Festival. She appears in the mystery drama Lost Girls, which made its premiere at The Sundance Film Festival in 2020, and was later made available on Netflix. In 2021, Kirke starred in the B. J. Novak anthology series The Premise for FX and Hulu. Kirke appears in the HBO series about the Los Angeles Lakers, Winning Time, and the drama series Three Women, based on Lisa Taddeo’s book of the same name.

Kirke is an activist for women's rights. In 2017 she notably wore a "Fuck Paul Ryan" pin on her gown to the Golden Globes to protest the defunding of Planned Parenthood.

Kirke is also active in music. In 2016 she released an EP. In 2018, she released three singles, including two with accompanying music videos, "Monster" and "Supposed To". Her debut album, Heart Head West, was released on August 10, 2018 by Downtown Records.

On March 12, 2019, Kirke released a cover of Rick Danko's "Sip the Wine" on Downtown Records, produced by Matthew E. White at his Richmond, Virginia studio, Spacebomb Studios. In October 2021, Kirke was signed to Third Man Records.

In April 2022, Third Man released her sophomore LP, Lady for Sale. The album was hailed as "immediately iconic" by AllMusic, and was said to bridge "the gap that once existed between Madonna and the Mandrell Sisters," by Uncut Magazine. "A new era of sparkle-country is upon us," declared No Depression. "Lola Kirke is here to usher it in." "Lyrically, Kirke moves into the top tier of writers," wrote The Line of Best Fit. Pitchfork gave the album a mixed review, finding both "pure pastiche" and "pure delight" in its "genre-first approach".

In August 2022, it was announced that Kirke would be supporting Swedish folk duo First Aid Kit on their UK Tour in November and December 2022.

In 2024, Kirke released "Country Curious", an EP produced by Elle King and featuring artists like First Aid Kit and Rosanne Cash, who invited her to make her Grand Ole Opry debut in June Carter’s dress.

In 2025, she released her third full length LP Trailblazer, produced by GRAMMY winner Daniel Tashian (Kacey Musgraves, Sarah Jarosz) to critical acclaim. Hailed by the Tennessean as “the most honest and best release of her career," and included in Rolling Stone's Best Albums of 2025 So Far, Trailblazer, Holler Country said "is a revelation... an essential country album." The deluxe release of the album also features a collaboration on a cover of the viral Yeah Yeah Yeahs song "Maps" with Willow Avalon.

Kirke is also featured on the GRAMMY nominated soundtrack to Sinners.

Kirke's first book Wild West Village: Not a Memoir—Unless I Win an Oscar, Die Tragically, or Score a Country #1 was published in 2025 by Simon & Schuster landing on most anticipated lists from Harper's Bazaar, Town & Country, LitHub, and Bustle. Kirkus called the debut "a funny, raw, and painful book about a woman’s chaotic, thoroughly individual path to coming into her own," while Booklist praised Kirke's insights as "a delicious peek behind the veil, like an Andy Warhol Diaries for rich New York City art kids of the new millennium."

== Filmography ==
=== Film ===
Year	Title	Role	Notes
2011	Another Happy Day	Charlie	
2013	Reaching for the Moon	Margaret	
2014	Free the Nipple	Liv	
2014	Song One	Rema	
2014	Gone Girl	Greta	
2015	Mistress America	Tracy	
2016	Fallen	Penn	
2016	AWOL	Joey	
2017	Gemini	Jill LeBeau	
2017	Active Adults	Lily	
2017	American Made	Judy Downing	
2018	Viper Club	Amy	
2018	Untogether	Tara Moore	
2019	Dreamland	Phoebe Evans	Voice
2019	American Woman	Yvonne	
2020	Lost Girls	Kim	
2021	Broken Diamonds	Cindy	
2025	Atropia	Candy	
2025	Sinners	Joan	Also contributed to "Pick Poor Robin Clean" and "Will Ye Go, Lassie Go?" from the film's soundtrack
TBA	Eleven Days	TBA	Post-production

=== Television ===
Year	Title	Role	Notes
2013	Law & Order: Special Victims Unit	Gabby Shaw	Episode: "Traumatic Wound"
2014	The Leftovers	Hailey	Episode: "Pilot"
2014–2018	Mozart in the Jungle	Hailey Rutledge	Main cast
2018	OK K.O.! Let's Be Heroes	Holo-Jane (voice)	Episode: "Your World is an Illusion"
2021	The Premise	Allegra	Episode: "The Commentator"
2022	Winning Time: The Rise of the Lakers Dynasty	Karen Bua West	2 episodes
2024	Three Women	Lily	4 episodes

== Discography ==
- EP (2016)
- Heart Head West (2018)
- Lady for Sale (2022)
- Country Curious (2024)
- Trailblazer (2025)
