= List of Ben Mendelsohn performances =

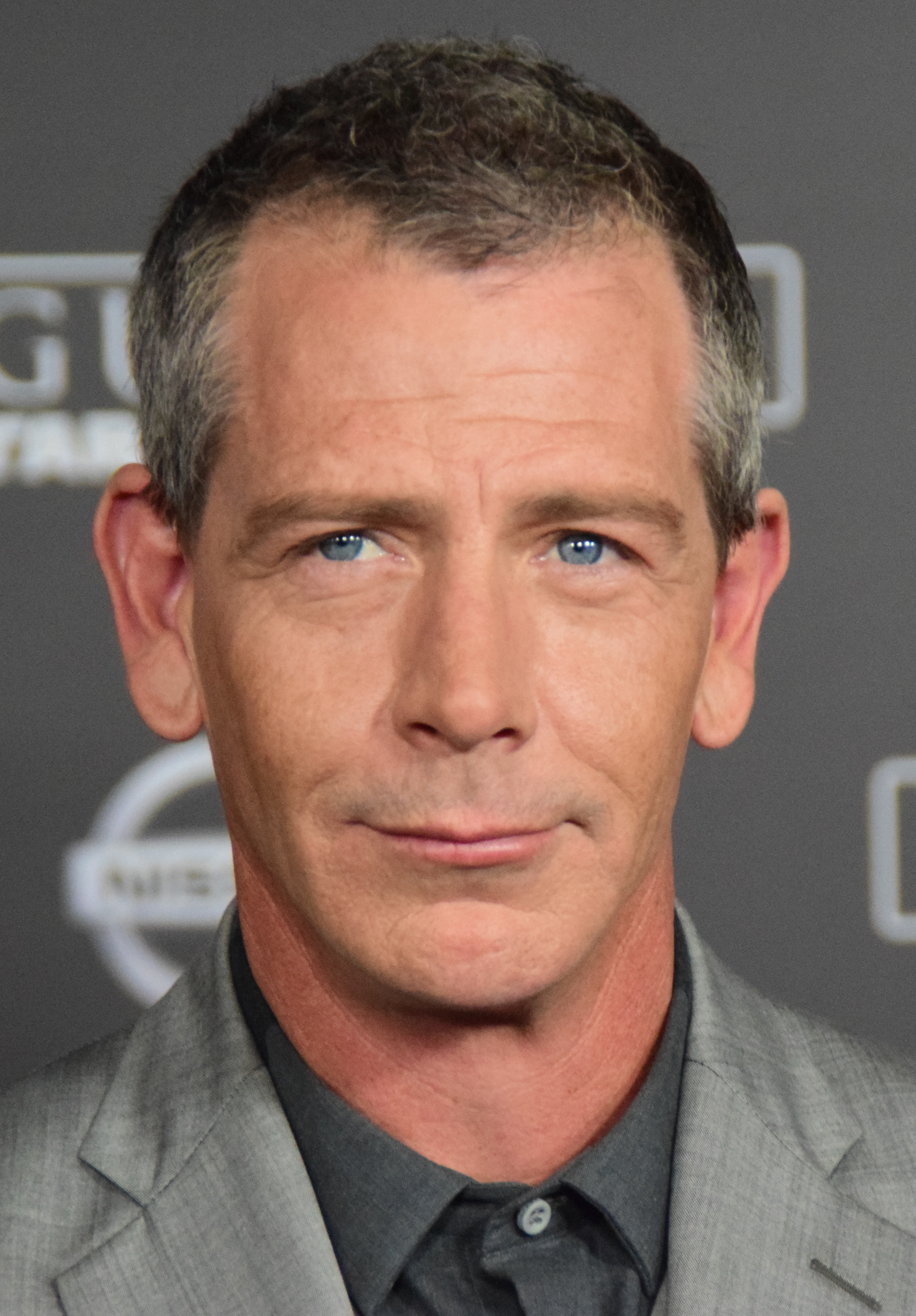
Mendelsohn at the Rogue One world premiere in December 2016

Australian actor Ben Mendelsohn first rose to prominence in Australia with his breakout role in the 1987 coming of age drama film The Year My Voice Broke. He has gone on to co-star in the films Animal Kingdom (2010), The Dark Knight Rises (2012), and Starred Up (2013). He co-starred in the 2014 films Lost River with Christina Hendricks, Exodus: Gods and Kings with Christian Bale and Black Sea with Jude Law. In 2015, he starred in the American drama film Mississippi Grind with Ryan Reynolds. The following year, he was cast as Orson Krennic in the epic space opera film Rogue One, the first installment of the Star Wars anthology series. He portrayed King George VI in the 2017 war drama film Darkest Hour with Gary Oldman. The same year, it was announced that he would be joining the Marvel Cinematic Universe as Talos. He has played the character in Captain Marvel (2019), Spider-Man: Far From Home (2019) and the Disney+ series Secret Invasion (2023).

In 2018, he played the antagonist Nolan Sorrento in Steven Spielberg's dystopian science fiction adventure film Ready Player One, based on Ernest Cline's novel of the same name. He also co-starred in the drama film Untogether, written and directed by his then-wife Emma Forrest and action-adventure film Robin Hood as the Sheriff of Nottingham. The same year, he starred in the drama film The Land of Steady Habits with Connie Britton.

Mendelsohn's Australian television work includes playing Warren Murphy on the soap opera Neighbours (1986–1987), a recurring role on the drama series Love My Way (2006–2007), and a main role in the drama series Tangle (2009). In 2015, he was cast as Danny Rayburn in the American Netflix original thriller drama television series Bloodline (2015–2017). The role earned him the Primetime Emmy Award for Outstanding Supporting Actor in a Drama Series in 2016. From 2019 to 2020, he voiced the character of Special Agent Mace in the animated series Infinity Train. Then in 2020, he starred in the HBO psychological thriller-horror crime drama series based on the 2018 novel of the same name by Stephen King, The Outsider.

== Film ==
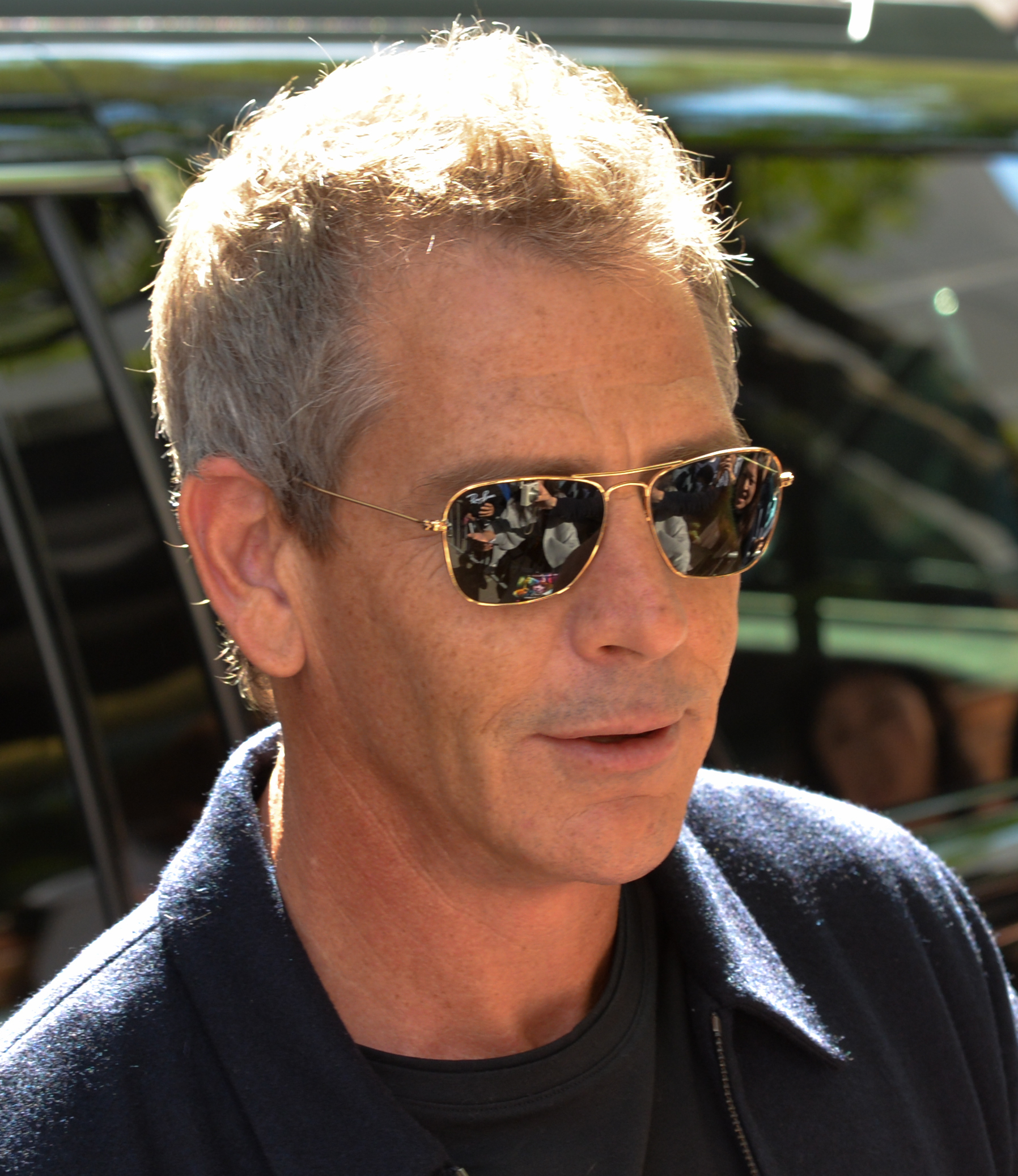
At the 2017 TIFF

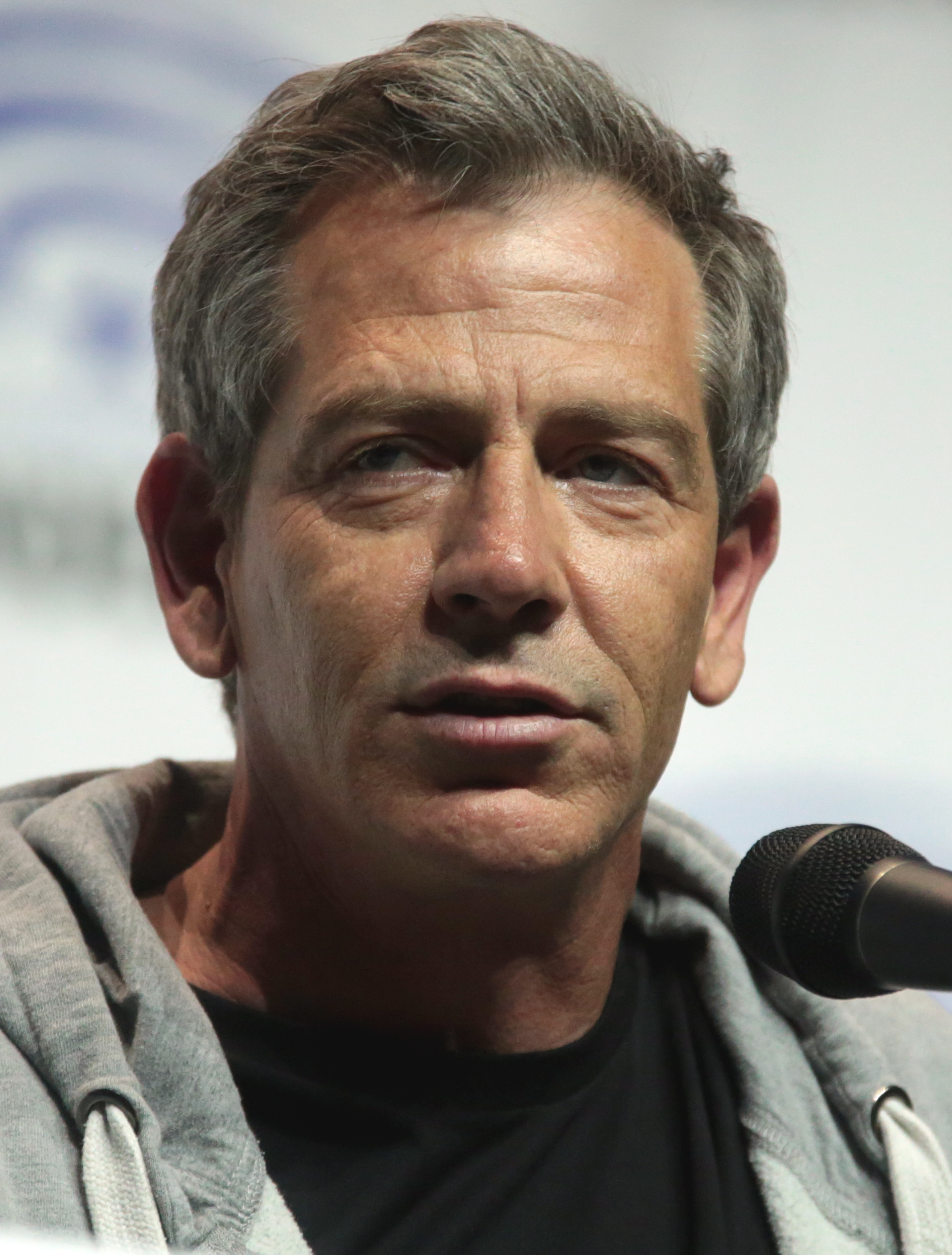
Speaking at the 2018 WonderCon

Year	Title	Role	Notes	Ref.
1986	The Still Point	Peter		
1987	The Year My Voice Broke	Trevor Leishman		
1989	The Big End	–	Short film	
1989	Lover Boy	Gazza		
1990	Return Home	Gary		
1990	Nirvana Street Murder	Luke		
1990	The Big Steal	Danny Clarke		
1990	Quigley Down Under	O'Flynn		
1991	Spotswood	Carey	Also known as The Efficiency Expert	
1992	Map of the Human Heart	Farmboy		
1993	Say a Little Prayer	Nursery Boss		
1994	Sirens	Lewis		
1994	Metal Skin	Robert ‘Dazey’ Day		
1996	Cosi	Lewis Riley		
1996	Idiot Box	Kev		
1996	Drive By Shooting	–	Short film	
1997	Tangerine Dream	–	Short film	
1997	True Love and Chaos	Jerry		
1997	Amy	Robert Buchanan		
1998	Love Brokers	Jimmie J		
1998	Little America 2	Jimmy	Short film	
2000	Sample People	John		
2000	Vertical Limit	Malcolm Bench		
2001	Mullet	Eddie "Mullet" Maloney		
2002	Black and White	Rupert Murdoch		
2005	The New World	Ben		
2006	Hunt Angels	Rupert Kathner	Docudrama	
2008	$9.99	Lenny Peck (voice)		
2008	Australia	Captain Emmett Dutton		
2009	Knowing	Phil Beckman		
2009	Prime Mover	Johnnie		
2009	Beautiful Kate	Ned Kendall		
2010	Animal Kingdom	Andrew "Pope" Cody		
2010	Needle	Detective Meares		
2011	Killer Elite	Martin		
2011	Trespass	Elias		
2012	Killing Them Softly	Russell		
2012	The Dark Knight Rises	John Daggett		
2012	The Place Beyond the Pines	Robin Van Der Hook		
2013	Adoration	Harold	Also known as Adore or Two Mothers	
2013	Starred Up	Neville Love		
2014	Lost River	Dave		
2014	Exodus: Gods and Kings	Viceroy Hegep		
2014	Black Sea	Fraser		
2015	Slow West	Payne		
2015	Mississippi Grind	Gerry		
2015	Guns for Hire	Kyle Sullivan	Also known as The Adventures of Beatle	
2016	Una	Ray Brooks		
2016	Rogue One	Director Orson Krennic		
2017	Darkest Hour	King George VI		
2017	I Am Heath Ledger	Himself	Documentary	
2018	Ready Player One	Nolan Sorrento		
2018	Untogether	Martin		
2018	The Land of Steady Habits	Anders Hill		
2018	Robin Hood	Sheriff of Nottingham		
2019	Captain Marvel	Talos		
2019	Spider-Man: Far From Home	Talos	Uncredited cameo; post-credits scene	
2019	The King	King Henry IV		
2019	Babyteeth	Henry Finlay		
2019	Spies in Disguise	Killian (voice)		
2019	Gorillaz: Reject False Icons	Himself	Documentary	
2021	Cyrano	De Guiche		
2023	To Catch a Killer	Chief Investigator Geoffrey Lammark	Also known as Misanthrope	
2023	The Marsh King's Daughter	Jacob Holbrook		
2024	Freaky Tales	The Guy		
2025	Roofman	Ron Smith		
2026	Company		Post-production	
2026	Zero A. D.: The Birth of Christ	Nahash	Post-production	
2027	Blood on Snow		Post-production	
TBA	Speed-the-Plow	Charlie Fox	Post-production	

Key
†	Denotes films that have not yet been released

== Television ==
Year	Title	Role	Notes	Ref.
1984	Special Squad	Spud	Episode: "Slow Attack"	
1985	A Country Practice	Luke Dawson	2 episodes: "A Little Knowledge Pt 1", "A Little Knowledge Pt 2"	
1985	The Henderson Kids	Ted Morgan	20 episodes	
1985	Zoo Family	Martin	Episode: "The Good, The Bad and Martin"	
1986	Prime Time	Bartholomew 'Bart' Jones		
1986	Fame and Misfortune	John	6 episodes	
1986–1987	Neighbours	Warren Murphy	19 episodes	
1987, 1989	The Flying Doctors	Brad Harris, Brian	2 episodes: "Realms of Gold", "Blues for Judy"	
1988	The Insiders – A Journey through Form S	Michael	Educational video	
1988	All the Way	Lindsay Seymour	3 episodes	
1989	This Man... This Woman	Matthew Clarke	2 episodes	
1989, 1994, 1996	G.P.	Phillip Barton, Max Fisher, Ben Mason	4 episodes	
1991	Col'n Carpenter	Grant Fuller	Episode: "Coming Home"	
1994	Roughnecks	Joe 90	Episode: "Joe 90"	
1995	Snowy River: The McGregor Saga	Dale Banks	Episode: "High Country Justice"	
1995	Police Rescue	Dean Forman	Episode: "Wild Card"	
1995	Halifax f.p.	Peter Donaldson	Episode: "My Lovely Girl"	
1996	Close Ups	Biz	Episode: "Security"	
1997	Good Guys, Bad Guys	Brian O'Malley	Episode: "Unfinished Business"	
1998	The Singer and the Swinger	Lee Gordon	Documentary	
1999	Queen Kat, Carmel & St Jude	Vince McCaffery	Miniseries, 4 episodes	
1999	SELLebrity SELLection	Himself	Television short film; also producer	
1999	Secret Men's Business	Doug Peterson	Television film	
2001	Love is a Four Letter Word	Himself	Episode: "Faff"	
2001	The Wonderful World of Disney	Alexander Hall	Episode: "Child Star: The Shirley Temple Story"	
2001	Australian Story	Host	Episode: "The Prodigal Son"	
2002	Farscape	Sko	Episode: "I-Yensch, You-Yensch"	
2004	Second Chance (aka Last Chance Paradise)	Dr. Larry Stewart	Television film	
2005	The Secret Life of Us	Rob	5 episodes	
2006–2007	Love My Way	Lewis Feingold	15 episodes	
2009	Tangle	Vince Kovac	10 episodes	
2009	Who Do You Think You Are?	Himself	1 episode	
2013	Girls	Salvatore Johansson	Episode: "Video Games"	
2013, 2015	Axe Cop	Ben / Sun Thief (voice)	4 episodes	
2015–2017	Bloodline	Danny Rayburn	Main role	
2019–2020	Infinity Train	Special Agent Mace (voice)	Recurring role	
2020	The Outsider	Ralph Anderson	Main role, miniseries; also executive producer	
2023	Star Wars: The Bad Batch	Orson Krennic (voice)	Episode: "The Summit"	
2023	Secret Invasion	Talos	Main role; miniseries	
2023	Faraway Downs	Captain Dutton	Miniseries	
2024	The New Look	Christian Dior	Main role, miniseries	
2025	Andor	Orson Krennic	4 episodes	

== Theatre ==
Year	Title	Role	Venue	Ref.
1980s	The Royal Hunt of the Sun	Inca	Heidelberg Theatre Company	
1991	On Our Selection	Andy Pettigrew (The Son)	Arts Centre Playhouse, Melbourne with MTC	
1992	Così	Lewis Riley	Belvoir St Theatre, Sydney	
1999	Coloured Inn		Illawarra Performing Arts Centre (IPAC), Bruce Gordon Theatre, Wollongong	
2002	My Zinc Bed	Paul Peplow	Belvoir St Theatre, Sydney	
2004	Petunia Takes Tea		Newtown Theatre, Sydney for Short+Sweet	
2004	The Glass Menagerie	Tom Wingfield	Arts Centre Playhouse, Melbourne with MTC	
2005	Julius Caesar	Marc Antony	Wharf Theatre, Sydney with STC	

== Video games ==
Year	Title	Role	Ref.
Q2 2027 (Expected)	Squadron 42	Julian Wexler	
