= Sednaoui =

Sednaoui is a surname. Notable people with the surname include:

- Elisa Sednaoui, Italian-born social entrepreneur, author, and philanthropist
- Stéphane Sednaoui, French director
