= Alice Dellal =

British model

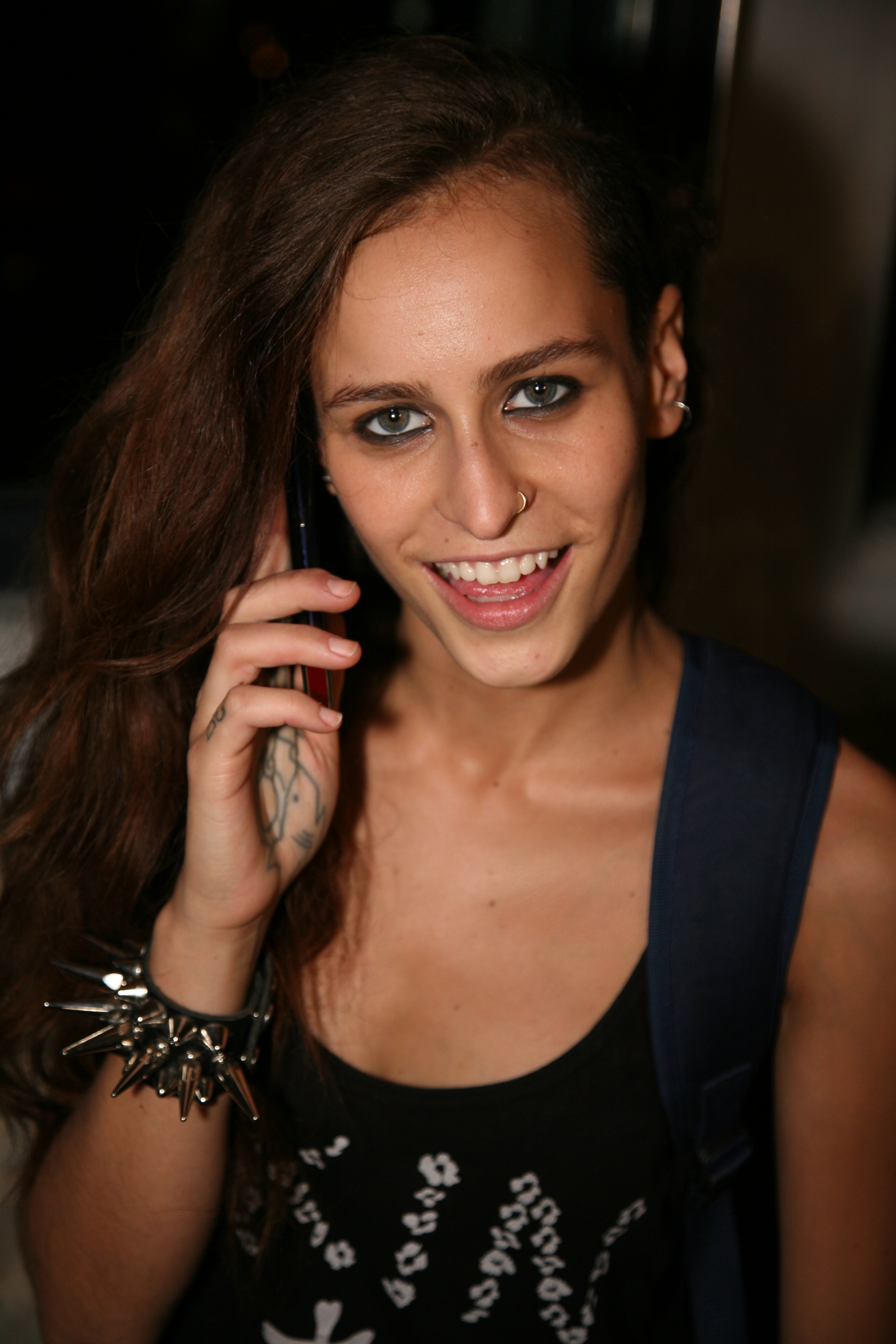
- Dellal in 2009
- Occupations: Photographer, model
- Modelling information
- Height: 1.67 m (5 ft 5 1/2 in)
- Hair colour: Dark Blonde
- Eye colour: Blue/Green

Alice Olivia Dellal is a British model and photographer.

== Biography ==
In 2008, she was the face of Mango and the body of the Agent Provocateur collection.

In 2011, she was chosen by Karl Lagerfeld to be the new face for the new 'boy' bag Chanel campaign.

Alice is also a drummer for Thrush Metal, an all-female band of four best friends who not only decided to start their own band, but also created their own record label, Sweet Dick Music. Thrush Metal was formed by Dellal with two other models, Emma Chitty (bassist) and Laura Fraser (vocalist), and Isabella Ramsey (guitar), niece of the Earl of Dalhousie. She has also worked as a photographer.

Simon Kirke, Jemima Kirke, Lola Kirke, Elisa Sednaoui, Jack Dellal, Charlotte Olympia Dellal, Gaby Dellal and Jasmine Dellal are among members of her family.
