= Geminola =

Clothing store in New York, US

Geminola was a New York vintage clothing store located at 41 Perry Street in the West Village.

It was founded in 2004 by Lorraine Kirke, the daughter of billionaire Jack Dellal and the ex wife of Free and Bad Company musician Simon Kirke.

The store's name was a combination of the names of three of her daughters and son, Greg, Domino, Jemima and Lola. Jemima Kirke wore a Geminola green velvet dress for the red carpet premier of Girls. The show's writer, Lena Dunham, worked there during her college years.

Many of the dresses sold at Geminola were one-of-a-kind pieces, made from vintage dresses and materials. Often only a few dresses of each vintage design were made, due to limited supply of the material.

The store was frequented by Sarah Jessica Parker and pieces were included in the show Sex and the City, other celebrity customers include Nicole Kidman, and Courtney Love Singer/model Kemp Muhl once mentioned Geminola as being one of her fashion inspirations. Model Daisy Lowe mentioned a piece she got from Geminola in a Vogue article. The store is mentioned in a piece about the band The Pierces, and in other publications.

Geminola's clothing was used in fashion spreads in the magazines Vogue, Teen Vogue, and Elle. In June 2013 the store was featured in a piece in Teen Vogue featuring sisters, Domino, Lola, and Jemima modeling the clothing. The music in this piece is by Domino. It was mentioned in The Village Voice as being a bright spot in the West Village.

Following a 12-year run, Geminola closed in 2016.
