= Ben Mendelsohn =

Australian actor (born 1969)

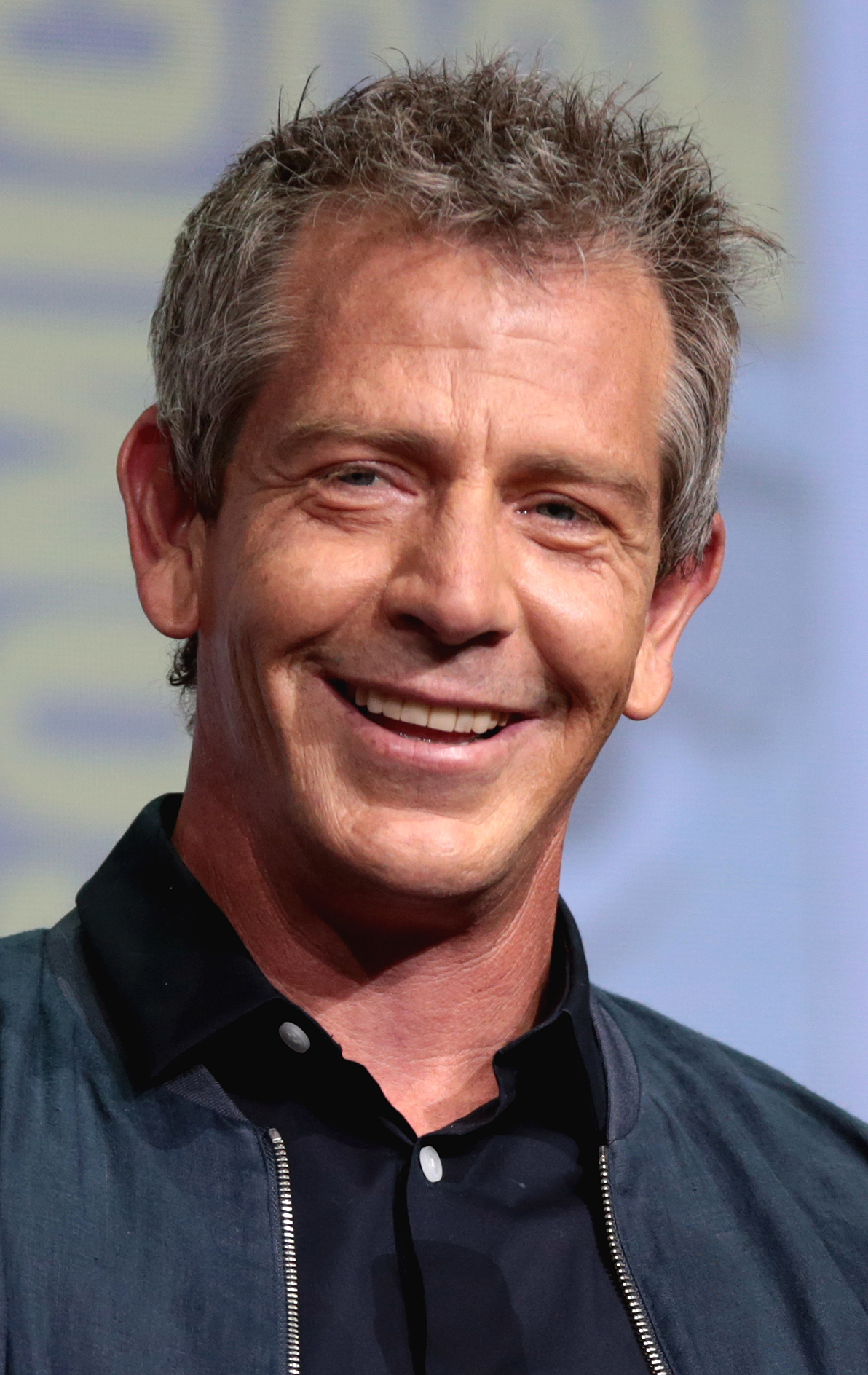
- Mendelsohn at the 2017 San Diego Comic-Con
- Born: Paul Benjamin Mendelsohn; 3 April 1969 (age 57); Melbourne, Victoria, Australia
- Occupation: Actor
- Years active: 1984–present
- Works: List of performances
- Spouse: Emma Forrest (m. 2012; div. 2016)
- Children: 2

Paul Benjamin Mendelsohn (born 3 April 1969) is an Australian actor. He first rose to prominence in Australia for his break-out role in The Year My Voice Broke (1987). He gained international attention for his starring role in the crime drama Animal Kingdom (2010). He has since had roles in films such as The Dark Knight Rises (2012), Starred Up (2013), Lost River (2014), Mississippi Grind (2015), Rogue One: A Star Wars Story (2016), Darkest Hour (2017) and Ready Player One (2018).

Mendelsohn starred in the Netflix drama series Bloodline (2015–2017), for which he won the Primetime Emmy Award for Outstanding Supporting Actor in a Drama Series in 2016. In the same year, he portrayed Orson Krennic in the Star Wars spin-off film Rogue One, and would later reprise the role in the second season of its companion series Andor (2025). He played the Sheriff of Nottingham in Robin Hood (2018). He joined the Marvel Cinematic Universe as Talos in the superhero film Captain Marvel (2019) and the Disney+ series Secret Invasion (2023). He has also starred in the HBO crime miniseries The Outsider (2020). In 2024, he began portraying fashion designer Christian Dior in the television series The New Look.

== Early life and family ==
Mendelsohn was born in Melbourne, Victoria, the son of Carole Ann (née Ferguson) and Frederick Arthur Oscar Mendelsohn. His father is a prominent medical researcher who previously headed the Howard Florey Institute in Melbourne, where he maintains the status of Professor Emeritus. Ben and his two brothers, Tom and David, as well as his mother (deceased), a registered nurse, lived in Europe and the United States for long periods of time, and returned to Melbourne when he was in primary school. He attended Mercersburg Academy in the U.S. before attending Heidelberg Primary School and Eltham High School and Banyule High (now Viewbank College).

In October 2009, he was featured in an episode of the Australian series Who Do You Think You Are?, which traced the ancestry of his paternal grandfather Oscar Mendelsohn, who was from a Jewish family. It also found convicts on his mother's side. Searching for a connection to composer Felix Mendelssohn, which was eventually dismissed, he discovered links to 19th-century Prussia. His paternal ancestors were among the first Prussian Jews to be naturalised in Schneidemühl in the province of Posen, now Piła in modern Poland. He also has Greek, German and British ancestry.

== Career ==
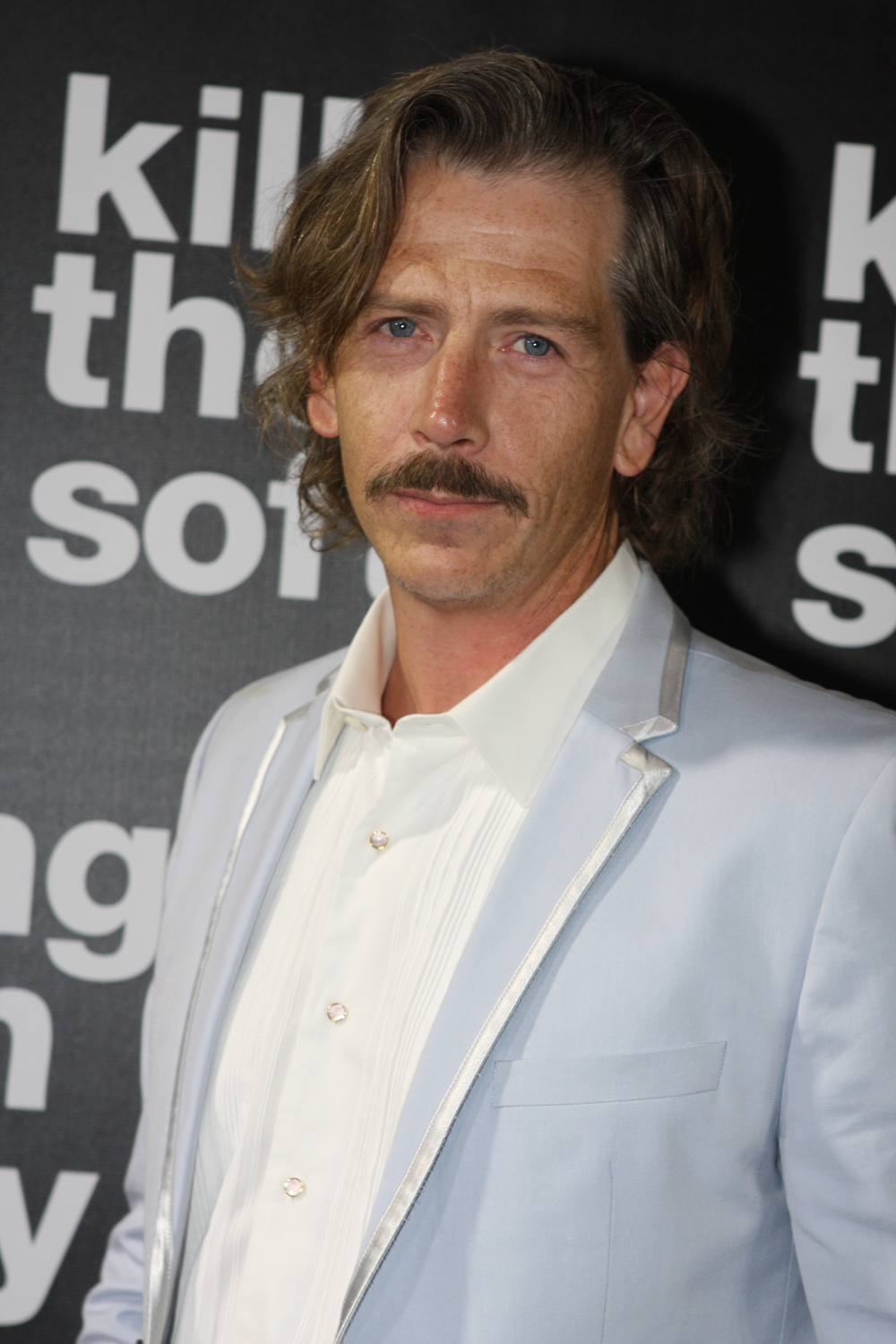
Mendelsohn at a screening of Killing Them Softly in 2012

After several early television roles, including The Henderson Kids alongside Kylie Minogue, he attracted notice in his break-out film, The Year My Voice Broke (1987), and won the Australian Film Institute Award for Best Supporting Actor. His next major role was in The Big Steal (1990), and Spotswood (1992), co-starring with Anthony Hopkins; and also he had a role in Quigley Down Under with Tom Selleck and Alan Rickman in 1990. This was followed in 1994 by Metal Skin and in 1996 by Cosi and Idiot Box. In 2000, he was in two contrasting films, the Australian Mullet and the Hollywood Vertical Limit.

In 2005, he was preparing to play Mark Antony in the Sydney Theatre Company-produced Julius Caesar, and he was in the Terrence Malick-directed film The New World.

Mendelsohn starred in the second (2005) and third (2006) season of the TV series Love My Way, and in 2008, he appeared in Baz Luhrmann's Australia. He starred in the first season of the Melbourne TV series Tangle, which premiered on Showcase in 2009. In 2009, he appeared in the American science fiction film Knowing directed by Alex Proyas. The same year, Mendelsohn starred as Ned in Beautiful Kate, directed by Rachel Ward, opposite Bryan Brown and Rachel Griffiths.

In 2010, he appeared in Animal Kingdom, starring in the film as Andrew "Pope" Cody, a criminal on the run from the law living in the notorious Melbourne Underworld. The role won him many awards, including IF Award's Best Actor and the AFI's award for Best Actor in a Leading Role. He was also named by GQ Australia as Actor of the Year for 2010.

Mendelsohn was selected as one of the subjects in the Who's Who in Australia 2012 edition. In 2012, Mendelsohn played the supporting roles of villain John Daggett in Christopher Nolan's The Dark Knight Rises and Robin Van Der Hook in Derek Cianfrance's The Place Beyond the Pines. In this same year, he played Russell in the neo-noir Killing Them Softly.

In 2012, he appeared in Florence + the Machine's music video for "Lover to Lover". The video was directed by Vincent Haycock. In 2013, he guest starred in the TV series Girls as the father of Jessa, played by Jemima Kirke. The following year, he appeared in the critically acclaimed Starred Up, directed by David MacKenzie, for which he won Best Supporting Actor at the British Independent Film Awards.

In 2014, Mendelsohn joined the cast of Bloodline, a Netflix original from the creators of Damages. The first season premiered on the site on 20 March 2015 and was well received. Mendelsohn's performance on the series was lauded by critics, resulting in a Primetime Emmy Award win as well as a Golden Globe Award nomination. In September 2016, Netflix announced that the show had been cancelled, and that it would end after its third season in 2017. Season 3 of Bloodline received negative reviews, and Mendelsohn appeared in two episodes of it.

In 2016, he appeared in video as an onstage "stand-in" during the Nostalgic For the Present concert tour of Australian singer Sia, for her song "Breathe Me".

He portrayed the villain Director Krennic in the Star Wars franchise's Rogue One in 2016. He called the opportunity to act in a Star Wars film "a childhood dream come true". A couple of years later in 2018, he played the role of Nolan Sorrento in Steven Spielberg's science fiction film Ready Player One. In 2018, he starred in the film The Land of Steady Habits. He was cast in the role of Talos in Marvel's film Captain Marvel alongside Brie Larson and Samuel L. Jackson. He reprised the role for a brief cameo in Spider-Man: Far From Home, also in 2019. That same year, Mendelsohn made his animated feature debut as the voice of Killian, the antagonist of Blue Sky Studios' Spies in Disguise.

In 2020, Mendelsohn starred in the lead role in the HBO crime miniseries The Outsider. In December 2020, it was announced he would be reprising his role as Talos, along with Samuel L. Jackson as Nick Fury, in the Disney+ series Secret Invasion. In 2025, Mendelsohn reprised his role as Director Krennic from Rogue One in the second season of Andor.

Mendelsohn will appear as Nahash of Ammon in the upcoming 2026 film Zero A. D.: The Birth of Christ, a dramatisation of the events around the Massacre of the Innocents.

== Personal life ==
Mendelsohn married British-American journalist Emma Forrest in June 2012. He has a daughter with Forrest, born in 2014, and another daughter from a previous relationship, Sophia Wright-Mendelsohn, who is also an actor. He and Forrest divorced in 2016.

== Music ==
Year	Title	Artist	Notes
1993	Full Moon, Dirty Hearts	INXS	Music video appearance
1996	"Theme from Skippy the Bush Kangaroo"	Ben Mendelsohn	Idiot Box (original motion picture soundtrack)
1997	"Remember to Forget"	Ben Mendelsohn & Phil Judd	Amy (original motion picture soundtrack - onscreen only)
1997	"Sense of Humour"	Ben Mendelsohn & Phil Judd	Amy (original motion picture soundtrack - onscreen only)
1997	"Runaway Train"	Ben Mendelsohn & Phil Judd	Amy (original motion picture soundtrack - onscreen only)
1997	"Shakedown the Moon"	Ben Mendelsohn & Phil Judd	Amy (original motion picture soundtrack - onscreen only)
1998	"What I Don't Know 'bout You"	You Am I	Music video appearance
2007	"Out in the Blue"	Jimmy Barnes	Music video appearance
2012	"Lover to Lover"	Florence and the Machine	Music video appearance
2014	"Cool Water"	Ben Mendelsohn	Lost River (original motion picture soundtrack)
2014	"Magic Moments"	Ben Mendelsohn	Lost River (original motion picture soundtrack)
2016	"Breathe Me"	Sia	On-stage interpretive dance
2017	Humanz	Gorillaz	Narration on intro and interludes
2019	"Unless It Kicks"	Ben Mendelsohn	Untogether (original motion picture soundtrack)
2021	"What I Deserve"	Ben Mendelsohn	Cyrano (original motion picture soundtrack)

== Awards and nominations ==
Year	Award	Work	Result	Ref.
1987	AACTA Award for Best Actor in a Supporting Role	The Year My Voice Broke	Won	
1990	AACTA Award for Best Actor in a Leading Role	The Big Steal	Nominated	
1991	AACTA Award for Best Actor in a Leading Role	Spotswood	Nominated	
1994	Film Critics Circle of Australia Award for Best Actor – Male	Metal Skin	Won	
1995	AACTA Award for Best Actor in a Supporting Role	Metal Skin	Nominated	
1997	Camério Award for Best Actor	Amy	Won	
2001	AACTA Award for Best Actor in a Leading Role	Mullet	Nominated	
2001	Film Critics Circle of Australia Award for Best Actor – Male	Mullet	Nominated	
2007	Logie Award for Most Outstanding Actor	Love My Way	Nominated	
2007	AACTA Award for Best Lead Actor in a Television Drama	Love My Way	Nominated	
2007	ASTRA Award Most Outstanding Performance by an Actor – Male	Love My Way	Nominated	
2008	ASTRA Award Most Outstanding Performance by an Actor – Male	Love My Way	Nominated	
2009	AACTA Award for Best Actor in a Leading Role	Beautiful Kate	Nominated	
2009	Film Critics Circle of Australia Award for Best Actor – Male	Beautiful Kate	Nominated	
2010	AACTA Award for Best Actor in a Leading Role	Animal Kingdom	Won	
2010	IF Award for Best Actor	Animal Kingdom	Won	
2010	Film Critics Circle of Australia Award for Best Actor – Male	Animal Kingdom	Won	
2010	Logie Award for Most Outstanding Actor	Tangle	Nominated	
2010	ASTRA Award Most Outstanding Performance by an Actor – Male	Tangle	Nominated	
2013	BIFA for Best Supporting Actor	Starred Up	Won	
2013	Village Voice Film Poll for Best Supporting Actor	Starred Up	Nominated	
2015	Independent Spirit Award for Best Male Lead	Mississippi Grind	Nominated	
2015	Critics' Choice Television Award for Best Supporting Actor in a Drama Series	Bloodline	Nominated	
2015	Primetime Emmy Award for Outstanding Supporting Actor in a Drama Series	Bloodline	Nominated	
2015	Satellite Award for Best Actor – Miniseries or Television Film	Bloodline	Nominated	
2016	Primetime Emmy Award for Outstanding Supporting Actor in a Drama Series	Bloodline	Won	
2016	Satellite Award for Best Supporting Actor – Series, Miniseries or Television Film	Bloodline	Won	
2016	Golden Globe Award for Best Supporting Actor – Series, Miniseries or Television Film	Bloodline	Nominated	
2017	Primetime Emmy Award for Outstanding Guest Actor in a Drama Series	Bloodline	Nominated	
2017	AACTA International Award for Best Supporting Actor	Darkest Hour	Nominated	
2019	AACTA Award for Best Actor in a Supporting Role	The King	Nominated	
2020	AACTA Award for Best Actor in a Supporting Role	Babyteeth	Won	
2021	Critics' Choice Super Award for Best Actor in a Horror Series	The Outsider	Nominated	
2021	AACTA International Award for Best Supporting Actor	Babyteeth	Nominated	

== See also ==
- List of Australian film actors
