= Tiny Furniture =

- Theatrical release poster
- Directed by: Lena Dunham
- Written by: Lena Dunham
- Produced by: Kyle Martin; Alicia Van Couvering
- Starring: Lena Dunham; Laurie Simmons; Cyrus Grace Dunham; David Call; Alex Karpovsky; Jemima Kirke; Amy Seimetz; Merritt Wever
- Cinematography: Jody Lee Lipes
- Edited by: Lance Edmands
- Music by: Teddy Blanks
- Production company: Tiny Ponies
- Distributed by: IFC Films
- Release dates: March 15, 2010 (SXSW); November 12, 2010 (United States)
- Running time: 98 minutes
- Country: United States
- Language: English
- Budget: $65,000
- Box office: $416,498

Tiny Furniture is a 2010 American comedy-drama film written, directed by, and starring Lena Dunham. The film premiered at South by Southwest, where it won the award for Best Narrative Feature, screened at such festivals as Maryland Film Festival, and was released theatrically in the United States on November 12, 2010. Dunham plays Aura, an aimless, jilted film school graduate who returns home on what she hopes is a temporary basis. Dunham's mother, artist Laurie Simmons, plays Aura's mother, while her real sibling, Cyrus Grace Dunham, plays Aura's on-screen sister. The actors Jemima Kirke and Alex Karpovsky would also appear in Dunham's television series Girls.

== Plot ==
Having been dumped by her boyfriend after graduation, Aura moves back home to her mother's loft in Tribeca for the summer. Aura's plan is to save money until her friend Frankie finishes her degree at Oberlin College and can move to the city so that they can be roommates. Aura's mother Siri is a successful photographer who takes pictures of scenes using tiny furniture. She is aided by Candice, her assistant, and Aura's teenage sister, Nadine. Siri is initially supportive of her daughter's return home while Nadine appears condescending toward her. Upon moving back into her old room, Nadine commands Aura to replace a lightbulb. While searching for one, Aura stumbles upon her mother's journals from when she was Aura's age, and she begins reading them clandestinely.

Shortly after arriving home, Aura goes to a party where she meets Jed, a mildly successful filmmaker who puts his work on YouTube. She also runs into her childhood friend Charlotte, a recovering drug addict. She and Aura return to Charlotte's apartment that night, where they smoke marijuana. Charlotte also helps Aura land an $11/hour (no tips) job taking reservations at a restaurant. The news that she has landed a job is quickly overshadowed by the fact that Nadine has won a prestigious poetry prize for high school students. Aura begins to feel anxious in comparison to her put-together younger sister and resents the close bond between Nadine and their mother.

Depressed, Aura begins to spend time with Jed, who is couchsurfing as his agent tries to land him a TV development deal, and flirts with Keith, a junior chef at the restaurant. When her mother and sister leave for a week in order to tour colleges, Aura invites Jed to stay with her. Together they discover that Aura's pet hamster Gilda has died, and they store it in the freezer in a plastic bag until Aura can bury her. Jed and Aura ultimately neglect to take care of the apartment while drinking most of Siri's wine and eating frozen dinners. Siri eventually confronts Aura about these things upon her return, which Aura first lies about before throwing a tantrum in front of her mother and sister. Despite this, Aura later asks her mom to let Jed extend his visit by having him stay on an inflatable mattress in her room. She is eventually forced to kick him out after he annoys Siri with his entitled attitude.

Meanwhile, Aura's flirtation with Keith hits a snag when she discovers he has a girlfriend and only seems interested in her ability to obtain prescription pills through Charlotte. After Keith stands her up when they make plans to get high together, Aura impulsively quits her restaurant job. Later that night, Nadine has a party in their loft while their mother is out for the night. Aura becomes upset, ostensibly by the number of drunk high schoolers at the party, and calls Charlotte to help deal with the situation. Upon arriving, however, Charlotte merely joins the party as well. Nadine eventually confronts Aura over her immaturity, yelling at her to grow up. The next morning, Aura's mother finds the frozen hamster in the freezer, which Aura promptly disposes of. Aura also tells a bewildered Frankie that she no longer can move in with her, offering the excuse that her mother needs her too much.

Unsure of what to do with her filmmaking degree, Aura lucks out when Charlotte asks a curator friend to put one of Aura's college videos in his gallery. At the exhibit, Charlotte is annoyed when Frankie appears to discuss living arrangements with Aura. Charlotte encourages Aura to leave Frankie in order to spend time with Keith, who also showed up. Ditching Frankie, Aura goes with Keith and the two smoke marijuana in the street. Encouraged by Charlotte's earlier advice to be spontaneous, Aura makes a move on Keith who, despite still being in a relationship, responds with passion. As Keith still lives with his girlfriend and Aura cannot bring him to her mother's apartment, the two crawl into a pipe in a construction yard where they have unprotected sex.

Returning home, Aura fights with her mother but eventually apologizes. She later climbs into bed with her and tells her about her evening with Keith. Aura confesses to having read her diaries, though her mother calmly replies she is not upset over it. Aura uses the opportunity to get to know her mother, and asks her about what she was like when she was Aura's age.

== Cast ==
- Lena Dunham as Aura
- Laurie Simmons as Siri
- Cyrus Grace Dunham as Nadine
- Jemima Kirke as Charlotte
- Alex Karpovsky as Jed
- David Call as Keith
- Merritt Wever as Frankie
- Amy Seimetz as Ashlynn
- Garland Hunter as Noelle
- Isen Ritchie as Jacob
- Mike S. Ryan as Homeless Man
- Alex Ross Perry as Ashlynn's Friend

== Production ==
The film was shot on the Canon EOS 7D. Filming took place in Tribeca and Lower Manhattan. The film was shot in November 2009. Dunham says she wrote a "tight script" to which the actors were faithful. The soundtrack included music by Teddy Blanks of The Gaskets, Domino (Domino Kirke, and Jordan Galland), Rebecca Schiffman and Sonia's Party! & The Everyone's Invited Band. The soundtrack is downloadable for free on the movie website.

== Home media ==
Tiny Furniture was released on DVD and Blu-ray Disc in 2012 as part of the Criterion Collection.

== Reception ==
=== Critical response ===
Tiny Furniture received generally positive reviews from critics and holds an 80% approval rating on Rotten Tomatoes, with an average rating of 6.9/10, based on 98 reviews. The site's critical consensus reads, "Agonizingly funny, Tiny Furniture marks an observant study of a failure to launch and an auspicious debut for writer-director Lena Dunham." On review aggregator website Metacritic, the film received a score of 72 out of 100, based on 30 critics, indicating "generally favorable reviews".

Joe Leydon of Variety gave the film a positive review, writing "Winner of the narrative feature prize at the SXSW Film Festival, Tiny Furniture should strike a responsive chord in anyone who remembers — or is experiencing — that post-college period in life when you’re impatiently eager to invent yourself, yet hesitant to get started. Written and directed by newcomer Lena Dunham, who also plays the lead role, this technically polished indie often feels like a semi-autographical effort by a filmmaker trying to work out issues in her art that she’s still confronting in life. But that, too, may help the pic connect with auds during limited theatrical exposure."

=== Accolades ===
Lena Dunham won for Best First Screenplay at the 2010 Independent Spirit Awards. The film also won Best Narrative Feature at the 2010 South by Southwest Film Festival.
