= Gasket (disambiguation) =

A gasket (correct terminology is a "joint" made from "jointing material") is a mechanical seal that fills the space between two mating surfaces.

Gasket may also refer to:

- Flange gasket, a type of gasket made to fit between two sections of pipe
- Head gasket, a gasket used in internal combustion engines
- Gasket (sailing), a rope used to hold a stowed sail in place
- Apollonian gasket, a fractal generated from triples of circles
- Sierpiński triangle, also called Sierpiński gasket or Sierpiński sieve, a fractal generated from triangles
- The Gaskets, U.S. synth-pop/rock band
