= On a Clear Day (film) =

2005 Scottish film by Gaby Dellal

- Theatrical poster
- Directed by: Gaby Dellal
- Written by: Alex Rose
- Produced by: Dorothy Berwin; Sarah Curtis
- Starring: Peter Mullan; Brenda Blethyn; Sean McGinley; Jamie Sives; Ron Cook; Benedict Wong; Jodhi May; Billy Boyd
- Cinematography: David Johnson
- Edited by: Robin Sales; John Wilson
- Music by: Stephen Warbeck
- Distributed by: Icon Film Distribution
- Release dates: January 2005 (Sundance); 2 September 2005 (United Kingdom)
- Running time: 98 minutes
- Country: Scotland
- Language: English

On a Clear Day is a 2005 Scottish drama film written by Alex Rose and directed by Gaby Dellal. It stars Peter Mullan as Frank Redmond, an engineer in the shipyards on the River Clyde, who becomes stagnant and quickly sinks into depression following his redundancy. A naturally strong swimmer, Frank gets an idea while on a 'booze cruise' with his friends to swim the English Channel. Featuring an ensemble cast, it co-stars Brenda Blethyn, Sean McGinley and Billy Boyd, among others.

The filmed won two BAFTA Scotland Awards for Best Film and Best Screenplay.

== Plot ==
The story is set in Glasgow, Scotland near the banks of the River Clyde. After completing the construction of the ship RFA Mounts Bay, Frank Redmond (played by Peter Mullan) and a few of his co-workers are laid off from the shipyards after 36 years service. This, along with his grief still suffered over the drowning of one of his sons many years ago, plummets Frank into a deep depression. He gets on well with his wife, Joan (Brenda Blethyn), but their relationship is distant. Joan is studying to become a bus driver; an arrangement which she initially keeps a secret from her husband. His other son, Rob (Jamie Sives), is a devoted house husband who looks after his twin sons, while his wife, Angela (Jodhi May) works full-time at the local Jobcentre. Rob has a troubled relationship with his father, feeling the guilt of being the 'surviving' son.

After a violent panic attack, Frank realizes that he needs some focus in his life, and, after a booze cruise along the English Channel, decides to focus his efforts on swimming across it. Frank trains with the help of friend and local chip shop owner Chan (Benedict Wong) and former co-workers Danny (Billy Boyd), Eddie (Sean McGinley) and Norman (Ron Cook) until he feels he is fit and ready for the attempt. A successful crossing alleviates the family tensions.

== Filming locations ==
The majority of the film was shot in Glasgow. The production visited Kent to shoot at the foot of the White Cliffs of Dover where Frank starts his swim of the English Channel and the famous cliffs can also be seen in the background throughout his challenge. The Port of Dover was used for the scenes where Frank’s family and friends race to meet him in France at the end of his swim.

== Cast ==
- Peter Mullan as Frank Redmond
- Brenda Blethyn as Joan Redmond
- Jamie Sives as Rob Redmond
- Jodhi May as Angela Redmond
- Billy Boyd as Danny
- Benedict Wong as Chan
- Sean McGinley as Eddie
- Ron Cook as Norman
- Shaun Dingwall as Observer
- Tony Roper as Merv
