= Active Adults =

- Directed by: Aaron Fisher-Cohen
- Screenplay by: Max Fisher-Cohen; Aaron Fisher-Cohen
- Based on: The Circus by Max Fisher-Cohen
- Produced by: Spencer Dennis; Michael B. Clark; Karen Fischer; Warren Fischer; Aaron Fisher-Cohen; Max Fisher-Cohen; J.D. Gluckstern; Dave Goldblatt; Suzie Jozkowski; Lola Kirke; Alex Turtletaub
- Starring: Lola Kirke; Jonathan Rosen; Dominic Chianese; Joanna Merlin; Rosie Perez; Scott Cohen; Ellen Barkin
- Cinematography: Andrei Bowden-Schwartz
- Edited by: Sam Nalband
- Music by: Michael Rosen
- Production companies: Beachside; Bunker Features
- Distributed by: The Orchard
- Release date: November 2, 2017
- Running time: 80 minutes
- Country: United States
- Language: English

Active Adults is a 2017 comedy-drama film written by Max and Aaron Fisher-Cohen and directed by Aaron Fisher-Cohen. It stars Lola Kirke, Dominic Chianese, Jonathan Rosen and Joanna Merlin with supporting roles played by Rosie Perez and Ellen Barkin among others.

== Premise ==
A young couple, Malcolm and Lily, fail in their attempt to start their adult lives in New York City and end up moving in with Malcolm's grandparents in their New Jersey "active adult" community, where the grandparents' golden years are not as golden as Malcolm expected.

== Cast ==
- Lola Kirke as Lily
- Jonathan Rosen as Malcolm
- Dominic Chianese as Bart
- Joanna Merlin as Miriam
- Rosie Perez as Zoe
- Ellen Barkin as Lucy
- Scott Cohen as Mick
- Merwin Goldsmith as Hirsch
- Sondra James as Rose
- Audrey Turner as Katrina
