= Joanna Griffiths =

Canadian entrepreneur

- Griffiths in 2026

Joanna Griffiths (born c. 1984) is a Canadian businesswoman. She is the President and Founder of Knix Wear, Inc., a women's undergarment brand.

== Career ==
Griffiths attended Queen's University in Kingston, Ontario, graduating with a commerce degree.

Griffiths began her career as a publicist for Universal Music Group and the Toronto International Film Festival, before attending INSEAD in France. She graduated with her MBA in 2012. The next year, Griffiths launched Knix with leak-proof underwear. The company began selling wholesale, with Hudson's Bay as her brand's first retail partner. But in 2016, Griffiths pulled out of more than 700 North American retail spaces to focus on direct-to-consumer sales. During the pandemic, she decided to expand the company and take on outside capital. She experienced criticism from some investors who questioned her ability to lead her company while pregnant, and refused to accept money from any potential investors who doubted her. She raised $53 million in March 2021, closing the funding round three days before giving birth to twin girls. As of January 2022, Griffiths has opened up six brick-and-mortar Knix stores across North America.

In November 2021, Griffiths, along with singer and doula Domino Kirke, released Life After Birth: Portraits of Love and the Beauty of Parenthood, a book about the experiences of postpartum mothers featuring stories from parents like Ashley Graham and Amy Schumer. Ahead of International Women's Day, in February 2022, Griffiths and Ashley Graham released Big. Strong. Woman. at the Adweek Challenger Brands Summit, a film focused on combating female stereotypes and highlighting female strength.

In April 2022, Knix and American fashion designer Betsey Johnson collaborated to create a collection of intimates.

== Philanthropy ==
Griffiths pledged $100,000 to Black Lives Matter in 2020, and also started a GoFundMe to raise money to supply personal protective equipment to Canadian hospitals. Griffiths also partnered her brand with the Centre for Addiction and Mental Health, providing wire-free bras to female patients.

== Awards and accolades ==
In 2018, Griffiths was named Women of Influence's Entrepreneur of the Year, and has also received the Retail Council of Canada's Marketing Innovation Award. She is the winner of RBC Canadian Women Entrepreneur Start-Up Award. Knix was named the sixth fastest growing company in Canada, and also was recognized as Strategy magazine's 2020 Brand of the Year. Griffiths also won the EY Entrepreneur of the Year 2022 Ontario. In 2025 she was named one of Toronto Life's 50 most influential people.
