= Mistress America =

2015 film by Noah Baumbach

- Theatrical release poster
- Directed by: Noah Baumbach
- Written by: Noah Baumbach; Greta Gerwig
- Produced by: Noah Baumbach; Scott Rudin; Lila Yacoub; Rodrigo Teixeira; Greta Gerwig
- Starring: Greta Gerwig; Lola Kirke
- Cinematography: Sam Levy
- Edited by: Jennifer Lame
- Music by: Dean Wareham; Britta Phillips
- Production company: RT Features
- Distributed by: Fox Searchlight Pictures
- Release dates: January 24, 2015 (Sundance); August 14, 2015 (United States)
- Running time: 84 minutes
- Country: United States
- Language: English
- Box office: $3.3 million

Mistress America is a 2015 American comedy film directed by Noah Baumbach. It was written by Baumbach and Greta Gerwig, who stars alongside Lola Kirke. The film was released on August 14, 2015, by Fox Searchlight Pictures.

== Plot ==
College freshman Tracy is having trouble adjusting to life at Barnard College. She befriends a fellow student, Tony, but when he begins dating another girl, she reaches out to her soon-to-be stepsister Brooke, a 30-year-old woman who lives in New York City.

Tracy is entranced by Brooke. After a whirlwind night with her, Tracy pens a short story and submits it to her college's literary magazine. Tracy continues to spend time with Brooke, who reveals plans for a restaurant called Mom's after her dead mother; the restaurant is being financed by her partner. However, upon returning home one night, Brooke finds herself locked out of her apartment and discovers that her boyfriend has withdrawn financial support. Facing massive bills for the restaurant, Brooke visits a psychic who suggests Brooke should ask for the money from her former friend Mamie-Claire, with whom she had a falling-out after Mamie-Claire stole Brooke's idea for a T-shirt business and married her former fiancé, Dylan.

Tracy has Tony drive her and Brooke to Mamie-Claire's home in Connecticut, with Nicolette joining them to make sure that Tony and Tracy are not having an affair. At Mamie-Claire's home, Brooke and the others crash Mamie-Claire's book club, and Brooke asks Mamie-Claire to invest in the restaurant. Mamie-Claire insists that she will have to talk to her husband. While waiting for him, Brooke takes a call from her father and learns his wedding to Tracy's mother has been called off.

When Dylan comes home, rather than dismiss Brooke, he asks her to pitch her restaurant. Brooke stumbles, but Tracy, enthusiastic, steps in to help. Dylan tells Brooke he will give her the money but only to cover the debt she would incur from dissolving the business. Seeing that Tracy is upset by this, and also the toxic effect the offer is immediately having on Dylan and Mamie-Claire's relationship, Brooke refuses the money.

Meanwhile, Nicolette, who witnessed Tracy kissing Tony, confronts Tracy about her short story. The entire group reads it, and Brooke is offended by how Tracy characterized her. She informs her that they are no longer becoming sisters, as their parents no longer want to marry, and threatens to sue. Upset, Tracy, sitting outside the house, takes a hit on a bong Tony had fashioned from an apple with her initial emblazoned on it.

Tracy's story is accepted by the university's literary society, and she joins the group. She's still unable to fit in though, and decides to start her own literary club, inviting Tony and Nicolette to apply for membership.

Alone on Thanksgiving, Tracy goes to Brooke's old apartment and finds her packing, about to move to Los Angeles. Brooke was able to cover her debts, as Mamie-Claire gave her her share of money from the T-shirt business. Brooke also says she has passed the SAT and is considering going to college. Tracy invites Brooke to have Thanksgiving dinner with her. The two eat at a restaurant, with Tracy, as narrator, musing: "Being a beacon of hope for lesser people is a lonely business."

== Cast ==
- Greta Gerwig as Brooke Cardinas
- Lola Kirke as Tracy Fishko
- Matthew Shear as Tony
- Jasmine Cephas Jones as Nicolette
- Heather Lind as Mamie-Claire
- Michael Chernus as Dylan
- Cindy Cheung as Karen
- Kathryn Erbe as Stevie Fishko
- Sharon Washington as Professor
- Dean Wareham as Harold
- Rebecca Naomi Jones as party hostess
- Mickey Sumner as fake Brooke
- Rebecca Henderson as Anna

== Production ==
Baumbach and Gerwig stated the film was inspired by Broadway Danny Rose (1984), Something Wild (1986), and Tootsie (1982).

== Music ==
The film's musical score was composed by Dean Wareham and Britta Phillips, who had previously collaborated with Baumbach on The Squid and the Whale. Baumbach wanted a score that evoked 1980s New York, during the heyday of synth-pop bands such as New Order and OMD. A soundtrack album was released on August 14, 2015, by Milan Records.

== Release ==
On January 9, 2015, Fox Searchlight Pictures acquired worldwide distribution rights for the film. Mistress America premiered on January 24, 2015, at the Sundance Film Festival, and was released in the U.S. on August 14, 2015. It was released on DVD and Blu-ray in the U.S. on December 1, 2015.

== Reception ==
The film received positive reviews from critics. Review aggregator website Rotten Tomatoes reports that 82% of 187 critics gave the film a positive review, with an average rating of 7.4/10. The site's critical consensus reads, "Mistress America brings out the best in collaborators Noah Baumbach and Greta Gerwig, distilling its star's charm and director's dark wit into a ferociously funny co-written story." On Metacritic, it holds a 75 out of 100 rating based on 42 critics, indicating "generally favorable reviews". Variety's review from Sundance read, "Greta Gerwig shines in a tailor-made role in her and Noah Baumbach's spirited screwball follow-up to Frances Ha."

The central screwball-comedy section set in the Connecticut mansion divided critics. While conceding that the film's ending "resolves things on a basically satisfying, quasi-poignant note," Todd McCarthy in The Hollywood Reporter wrote that the "inconsistency of the approach overall, combined with Gerwig's maximum voltage performance, is disconcerting, even off-putting". Amy Nicholson, writing for LA Weekly, praised the casting of the section, and in particular the performance of Heather Lind, but found that the "clumsy" sequence "stops the movie cold". On the other hand, Peter Bradshaw, writing in The Guardian, praised the "outrageously farcical and funny extended sequence." For Nigel Andrews in the Financial Times, the "neo-screwball" sequence exemplified the film's themes of love, art, and betrayal; he called the film "funny, witty, joyous, mischievous and casually profound."
