= Hard Cases (TV series) =

British television crime drama series

- Genre: Crime drama
- Created by: John Harvey; Laurence James
- Written by: John Harvey
- Directed by: Richard Standeven
- Starring: John Bowe; Gil Brailey; Eric Deacon; Gaby Dellal; Barry Jackson; Gerrard McArthur; June Barrie
- Theme music composer: Tom Robinson
- Opening theme: "Hard Cases"
- Country of origin: United Kingdom
- Original language: English
- No. of series: 2
- No. of episodes: 13

Production
- Executive producer: Ted Childs
- Producers: Andrew Benson; Phillip Bowman
- Production locations: Nottingham, England, UK
- Editors: Patrick Harbinson; Jimmy McGovern
- Running time: 50 minutes
- Production company: Central Independent Television

Original release
- Network: ITV
- Release: 18 January 1988 – 29 August 1989

Hard Cases is a British television crime drama series, based upon a 1987 novel by John Harvey and Laurence James, that aired on ITV between 18 January 1988 and 29 August 1989. Based around a group of officers from the crime probation service in Nottingham, the cast was initially led by John Bowe, supported by Gil Brailey, Eric Deacon and Barry Jackson. The series was one of the first British seasonal dramas to feature multiple lead characters and multiple, entwined stories, rather than reading an individual story in each episode.

The series notably featured Jimmy McGovern and Patrick Harbinson as its script editors, both of whom went on to have very successful careers as lead writers. Graham Nicolls, a then-serving officer in the Nottingham CPS, acted as an advisor. The series was accompanied by its own theme, written and performed by Tom Robinson, which was issued as a single by Robinson in 1988. Notably, the series has neither been repeated since broadcast, nor is available on any form of home media.

== Cast ==
- John Bowe as Martin Berry (Series 1)
- Gil Brailey as Gill Ridgeley (Series 1―2)
- Eric Deacon as Ross Kennedy (Series 1―2)
- Gaby Dellal as Leonie Friedman (Series 1)
- Barry Jackson as Jack Seymore (Series 1―2)
- Gerrard McArthur as Kevin Nash (Series 1―2)
- June Barrie as Hilary Bowen (Series 1―2)
- Denica Fairman as Chrissie Taylor (Series 2)
- Kevin McNally as Richard Pearce (Series 2)
- Sheila Ruskin as Lucy Davenport (Series 2)
- Valerie Hunkins as Charlotte Poole (Series 2)
- Sean Pertwee as Dominic Lutovski (Series 2)
- Ian Kirkby as Peter Collinson (Series 1)
- Brian Poyser as Cllr. Collinson (Series 1)
- Emma Bowe as Claire Sanderson (Series 2)

== Episodes ==
=== Series overview ===
Series	Episodes	Originally released	
Series	Episodes	First released	Last released
1	6	18 January 1988	22 February 1988
2	7	18 July 1989	29 August 1989

=== Series 1 (1988) ===
No.	Title	Directed by	Written by	Original release date
1	Episode 1	Richard Standeven	John Harvey	18 January 1988
2	Episode 2	Richard Standeven	John Harvey	25 January 1988
3	Episode 3	Richard Standeven	John Harvey	1 February 1988
4	Episode 4	Richard Standeven	John Harvey	8 February 1988
5	Episode 5	Richard Standeven	John Harvey	15 February 1988
6	Episode 6	Richard Standeven	John Harvey	22 February 1988

=== Series 2 (1989) ===
No. overall	No. in series	Title	Directed by	Written by	Original release date
7	1	Episode 7	Michael Brayshaw	Robert Kingsley	18 July 1989
8	2	Episode 8	Michael Brayshaw	Robert Kingsley	25 July 1989
9	3	Episode 9	Michael Brayshaw	Robert Kingsley	1 August 1989
10	4	Episode 10	Anthony Garner	Nick Whitby	8 August 1989
11	5	Episode 11	Anthony Garner	Robert Kingsley	15 August 1989
12	6	Episode 12	Andrew Morgan	Harry Duffin	22 August 1989
13	7	Episode 13	Andrew Morgan	Nick Whitby & Tim Whitby	29 August 1989

== Bibliography ==
- Rob C. Mawby & Anne Worrall. Doing Probation Work: Identity in a Criminal Justice Occupation. Routledge, 2013.
