= Jack Dellal =

British property investor (1923–2012)

- Born: 2 October 1923; Chorlton-cum-Hardy, Manchester, England
- Died: 28 October 2012 (aged 89); London, England
- Education: Heaton Moor College
- Occupations: Chairman, Allied Commercial Holdings
- Known for: Property and oil investment, banking
- Spouse(s): Zehava Helmer (m. 1952, divorced) Katya Douglas (m. 1966; div. 1984) Ruanne Louw (m. 1997)
- Children: 9; including Gaby and Jasmine
- Relatives: Alice Dellal (granddaughter); Domino Kirke (granddaughter); Lola Kirke (granddaughter); Jemima Kirke (granddaughter); Charlotte Olympia (granddaughter); Harley Viera-Newton (granddaughter)

Jack Dellal (2 October 1923 – 28 October 2012) was a British property investor, nicknamed "Black Jack". His company, the property group Allied Commercial Holdings, financed the purchase of Shell Mex House in 2002 and sold it in 2007. Dellal had a net worth of £4.6 billion, making him one of the richest men in England during his time.

== Early life ==
Dellal was born in Chorlton-cum-Hardy, Manchester, to Iraqi Jewish immigrants of Sephardic heritage: Sulman Dellal, a textile importer and Charlotte Shashoua. He was educated at Heaton Moor College, in Stockport. Dellal worked with his father from the early age of 14, selling cloth.

== Career ==
Dellal became a banker in the 1970s. He owned the Dalton Barton London fringe bank, which he sold to Keyser Ullman for £58 million. He set up Allied Commercial in 1974 with Stanley Van Gelder, with whom he worked for over forty years. One of their deals was the flip of central London's Bush House in 2004, which made £75.0 million within two years. He was said to have invested up to £200m in London's Dolphin Square.

Dellal's nickname, "Black Jack", was popularly said to have derived from his love of gambling.

== Personal life ==
Through two marriages and at least one long term relationship, he had nine children, including film directors Gaby and Jasmine Dellal. His granddaughters include Alice Dellal, Domino Kirke, Lola Kirke, Jemima Kirke, and Charlotte Olympia Dellal.

In memory of his daughter Suzanne, Jack founded the Suzanne Dellal Centre for Dance and Theatre in Tel Aviv in 1989.

== Death ==
Dellal died in his sleep in London on 28 October 2012, aged 89.
