= Mississippi Grind =

2015 American drama

- Theatrical release poster
- Directed by: Anna Boden; Ryan Fleck
- Written by: Anna Boden; Ryan Fleck
- Produced by: Lynette Howell; Ben Nearn; Jamie Patricof; Tom Rice
- Starring: Ryan Reynolds; Ben Mendelsohn; Sienna Miller; Lio Tipton (Note: Credited as Analeigh Tipton; Tipton came out as non-binary and changed their name in 2021.); Alfre Woodard
- Cinematography: Andrij Parekh
- Edited by: Anna Boden
- Music by: Scott Bomar
- Production companies: Sycamore Pictures; Electric City Entertainment
- Distributed by: A24 DirecTV (United States); Annapurna International (international)
- Release dates: January 24, 2015 (Sundance); September 25, 2015 (United States)
- Running time: 108 minutes
- Country: United States
- Language: English
- Budget: $7.1 million
- Box office: $422,746

Mississippi Grind is a 2015 American comedy-drama film written and directed by Anna Boden and Ryan Fleck. It stars Ben Mendelsohn, Ryan Reynolds, Sienna Miller, Lio Tipton, Alfre Woodard and Robin Weigert. The film was released by A24 on September 25, 2015.

== Plot ==
Gerry, a struggling gambler and real estate agent, meets Curtis, an itinerant younger gambler, at a casino in Dubuque, Iowa. Curtis buys Gerry a drink; hours later, Gerry returns the favor, leading to a night of heavy drinking.

After an unsuccessful real estate showing, at the dog track, Gerry and Curtis win big, but Gerry gambles it away. At a bar, they drunkenly attempt to bet $1,000 on a game of pool and are kicked out. Curtis tells Gerry it's almost "Machu Picchu time" – a phrase he uses whenever he leaves town. In the parking lot, Gerry is stabbed during a mugging.

Gerry's loan shark, Sam, insists that he pay the money she was owed. Running into Curtis, Gerry proposes a gambling trip down the Mississippi River, culminating in a New Orleans poker game with a $25,000 buy-in. The game is being held by Curtis' former acquaintance, Tony Roundtree. He agrees, spotting Gerry $2,000. Before hitting the road, Gerry steals the petty cash from his office.

Arriving in St. Louis, Curtis reunites with Simone, a prostitute. After Gerry's successful poker session on a riverboat casino, he and Curtis spend the night with Simone and fellow prostitute Vanessa. While Gerry bonds with Vanessa, Simone agrees to join Curtis on the trip, but when she asks whether she will have to continue working as a prostitute or Curtis will cover her expenses, he loses interest in the idea.

In Memphis, Gerry plays well at Texas hold 'em but loses everything on the final "river" card. Lying to Curtis that he won $7,000, he asks to go to Little Rock to see his ex Dorothy and estranged daughter, Wendy. Wendy is at school; when Dorothy catches him stealing money, she orders him to leave.

Curtis and Gerry go to the Tunica, Mississippi casino, where Curtis' VIP card is rejected. Curtis asks Gerry for money and discovers his lie. Disappointed, Curtis provokes strangers in the bathroom into assaulting Gerry, who later admits to his problems with money and his belief that Curtis is his good luck charm.

Reaching New Orleans, they sell Gerry's car, go to a horse race, and agree to bet on a long shot. However, Curtis actually puts their money on the favorite (named "Mississippi Grind") without telling Gerry. When Mississippi Grind wins and Gerry thinks they've lost all their money, Curtis tells him he withheld $200, and gives Gerry $100 for a bus ticket home. Curtis then goes to the window and collects $5,000 in winnings.

Gerry fails to talk his way into the high-stakes poker game using Curtis as his in, as Tony clearly dislikes him and punches him in the nose. Curtis offers strangers $100 for a game of basketball, which he loses and then tells them he can't pay them. They beat him but when they go through his pockets and find his cash, they just take the $100 he lost. Curtis then visits his mother Cherry, a cabaret performer, leaving her most of his winnings.

At a casino, Gerry bets the last of his money first on a slot machine then on roulette, and wins. Curtis arrives at Gerry's blackjack table and loses his remaining money, but Gerry shares his chips. Their winnings continue to grow as they play craps, and Curtis calls Simone, proclaiming his love for her. Convinced they cannot lose, Gerry and Curtis bet their entire $285,000.

Over an expensive dinner, Gerry and Curtis discuss their plans, having won a half-million dollars. While Curtis wants a white Cadillac, all Gerry can come up with is he wants to do something nice for his daughter.

In the morning, Curtis finds Gerry has gone, leaving his half of the money with a note: "It's Machu Picchu time". Curtis flirts with the hotel clerk. She asks if he is going anywhere special. He replies, "Peru", offering to take her with him.

Gerry buys back his car from the dealer to whom he sold. Sitting once again in his own car, he turns it on and hears the gambling tips CD he left in the stereo. As the CD describes the mark of a confident player (sitting back, relaxed shoulders), Gerry's slouching posture transforms into a confident one and an American flag can be seen reflected upside down in the windshield.

== Cast ==
- Ben Mendelsohn as Gerry
- Ryan Reynolds as Curtis
- Sienna Miller as Simone
- Lio Tipton as Vanessa
- Alfre Woodard as Sam
- Robin Weigert as Dorothy
- Jayson Warner Smith as Clifford
- Marshall Chapman as Cherry
- Jane McNeill as Kate
- Indigo as Dora
- James Toback as Tony Roundtree
- Leo Welch as musician
- Jason Shaffette as Chuck

== Production ==
On August 15, 2012, Jake Gyllenhaal was in talks to join Anna Boden and Ryan Fleck on their gambling project; the duo would direct the film Mississippi Grind penned by themselves. On January 7, 2013, Ben Mendelsohn joined the cast of the film to star opposite Gyllenhaal. On February 1, 2013, it was announced that Panorama Media would produce the road trip drama Mississippi Grind, with Electric City Entertainment producing. On June 27, 2013, Ryan Reynolds joined the cast of the film to play the lead as a gambler, replacing Gyllenhaal in the cast. On November 6, 2013, Sienna Miller agreed to a starring role in the film alongside Reynolds and Mendelsohn, with production to start in January 2014 in New Orleans. On January 8, 2014, there was a casting call for extras to film some scenes at Mobile Greyhound Park in Mobile, Alabama. On January 27, 2014, Lio Tipton signed on to the film.

=== Filming ===
Principal photography began on January 19, 2014 in Mobile, Alabama, and went on through March 2014. The shooting was also done in New Orleans and Baton Rouge, Louisiana. On March 11, 2014, the crews were spotted filming scenes at Mobile Greyhound Park in Mobile.

== Release ==
The film had its world premiere at the Sundance Film Festival on January 24, 2015. On January 28, 2015, A24 and DirecTV Cinema had acquired distribution rights to the film. The film went onto premiere at the Karlovy Vary International Film Festival on July 4, 2015, and Melbourne International Film Festival on August 1, 2015. The film was released through DirecTV Cinema on August 13, 2015, before being released in a limited release on September 25, 2015. It was released on video on demand on October 13, 2015. It was selected to be screened in the Gala Presentations section of the 2015 Toronto International Film Festival.

== Reception ==
On Rotten Tomatoes, the film holds an approval rating of 91% based on reviews from 121 critics, with an average rating of 7.3/10. The website's critics consensus reads, "Well-acted and steeped in Southern atmosphere, Mississippi Grind is a road movie and addiction drama that transcends each of its well-worn genres." Metacritic, which uses a weighted average, assigns a score of 77 out of 100 based on 27 critics, indicating "generally favorable reviews".
