= Untogether =

- Theatrical release poster
- Directed by: Emma Forrest
- Written by: Emma Forrest
- Produced by: Luke Daniels; Brandon K. Hogan; Scott LaStaiti
- Starring: Jamie Dornan; Jemima Kirke; Lola Kirke; Ben Mendelsohn; Scott Caan; Jennifer Grey; Alice Eve; Billy Crystal
- Cinematography: Autumn Durald
- Edited by: Sophie Corra
- Music by: Robin Foster
- Production companies: Sterling Road Films; Redwire Pictures; Casadelic Pictures
- Distributed by: Freestyle Digital Media
- Release dates: April 23, 2018 (Tribeca); February 8, 2019 (United States)
- Running time: 98 minutes
- Country: United States
- Language: English

Untogether is an American drama film written and directed by Emma Forrest. Her directorial debut, it stars Jamie Dornan, Ben Mendelsohn, Lola Kirke and Jemima Kirke. The film centers on a recovering addict who attempts to get her writing career back on track.

It had its world premiere at the Tribeca Film Festival on April 23, 2018. It was released in a limited release and through video on demand on February 8, 2019, by Freestyle Releasing Media.

== Cast ==
- Jamie Dornan as Nick
- Jemima Kirke as Andrea Moore
- Lola Kirke as Tara Moore
- Ben Mendelsohn as Martin
- Billy Crystal as David
- Alice Eve as Irene
- Jennifer Grey as Josie
- Scott Caan as Ellis

== Production ==
Screenwriter Emma Forrest makes her feature directorial debut in this film, for which she also wrote the screenplay; her ex-husband Ben Mendelsohn also stars. Jemima Kirke and Lola Kirke, real-life sisters, also have their first collaboration in the film, which began production on October 17, 2016. In November 2016, Billy Crystal and Jennifer Grey joined the cast.

== Release ==
The film had its world premiere at the Tribeca Film Festival on April 23, 2018. Shortly after, Freestyle Digital Media acquired distribution rights to the film, and set it for a February 8, 2019, release.
