= Emma Forrest =

British-American film director, screenwriter and novelist

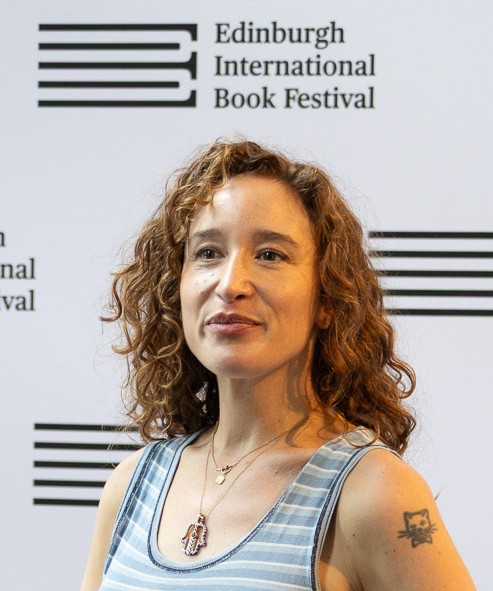
- Forrest in 2025
- Born: 26 December 1976 (age 49); London, England
- Occupations: Writer, director
- Spouse: Ben Mendelsohn (m. 2012; div. 2016)
- Children: 1
- Writing career
- Period: 1993–present
- Website: emmaforrest.com

Emma Forrest (born 26 December 1976) is an English film director, screenwriter and novelist. She has published two memoirs, the first of which, Your Voice in My Head, is set to be adapted to film.

== Early life ==
Forrest was born in London, England, to a Jewish family. Her American mother, Judy Raines, was also a writer, mainly for British television, and her father is British.

== Journalism ==
At age fifteen, Forrest wrote a story on Madonna for the London Evening Standard. She left school to write her "Generation X" column for the Sunday Times, writing about various britpop/indie bands "on the road". The Manic Street Preacher member Richey Edwards was the first person Forrest interviewed for the column.

Forrest has worked for Vogue, Vanity Fair, Harper's Bazaar, Time Out, The Guardian, NME and Interview and Blackbook, for whom she interviewed Snoop Dogg and Brad Pitt. In the autumn of 2011, she contributed an essay to the album Ceremonials by Florence and the Machine that was included in the CD booklet.

== Novels ==
Forrest has written five novels: Namedropper (1998), Thin Skin (2002), Cherries in the Snow (2005), Royals (2019), and Father Figure, which was released in the UK on July 2025.

== Anthologies ==
In 2001, Forrest contributed to an anthology on the writer J. D. Salinger titled Love & Squalor, with an essay describing Salinger's influence on some current young writers. In 2007, she co-wrote and edited her first non-fiction book, Damage Control – Women on the Therapists, Beauticians, and Trainers Who Navigate Their Bodies, which was an anthology of essays of the emotional pain women suffer for their own physical wellbeing. The book features contributions from women, including Helen Oyeyemi, Marian Keyes and Sarah Jones.

== Memoirs ==
Emma Forrest talks about Your Voice in My Head on Bookbits radio.

Forrest wrote a memoir, Your Voice in My Head (2011), concerning the death of her psychiatrist and her subsequent break-up with her partner. The memoir was announced as a feature film adaptation to be written by Forrest and directed by Francesca Gregorini, with Emma Watson in the lead role.

In August 2022, Forrest published a second memoir, Busy Being Free, concerning her divorce and return to living in London as a single parent. She shares further memoir-style insights on her Substack, which is titled 'The Peaceful Transfer of Power.'

== Screenwriting ==
A screenplay by Forrest about musician Jeff Buckley, Becoming Music, was bought by Brad Pitt's production company Plan B Entertainment in September 2000. In 2009, her screenplay LIARS (AE) was bought by Scott Rudin at Miramax, with Richard Linklater attached to direct. In 2009 she was listed on Variety's "Top Ten Screenwriters to Watch". Other screenplays in development include Know Your Rights (Film4) and How Could You Do This To Me (Paramount Pictures).

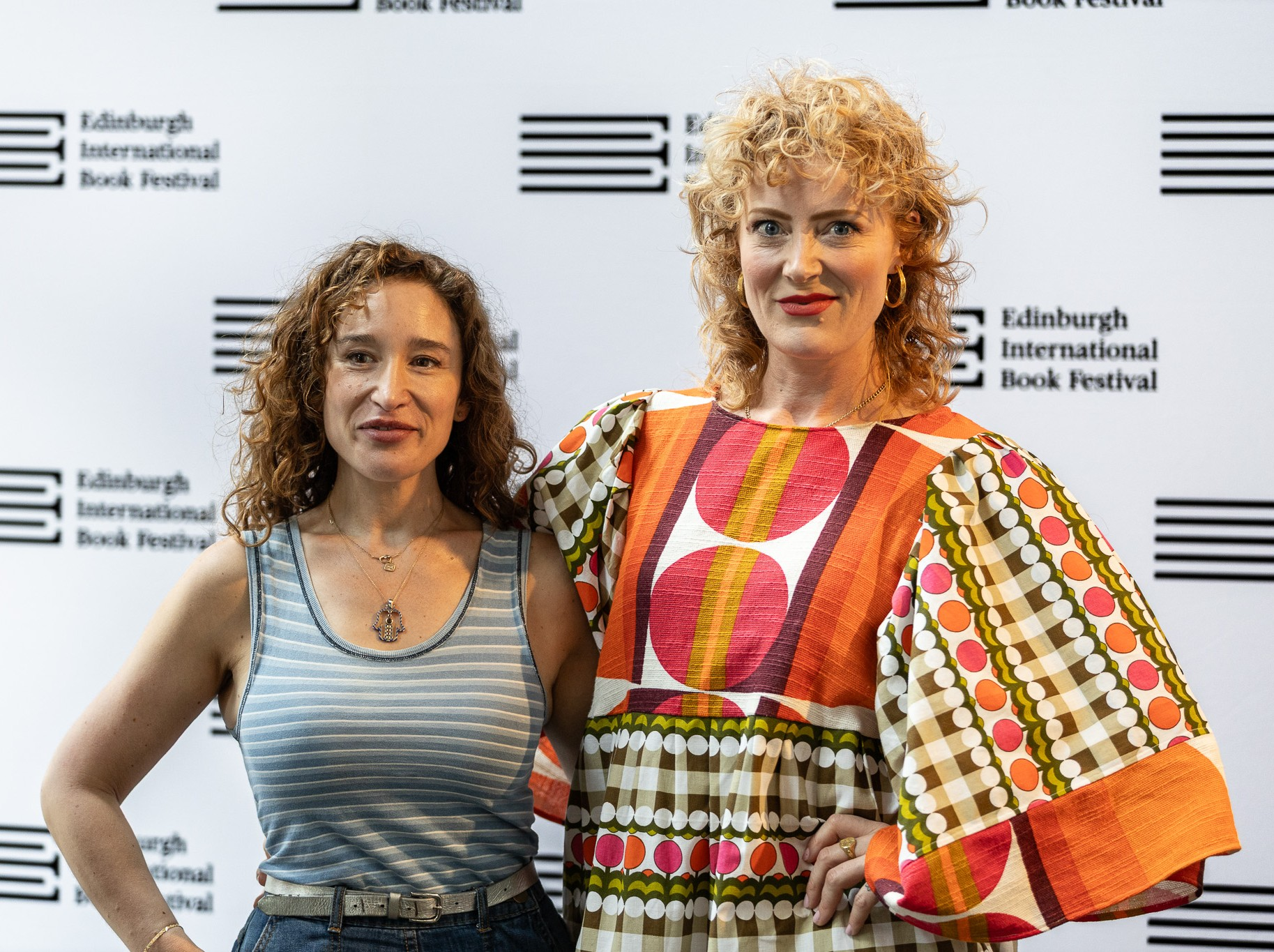
Emma Forrest and Emma Jane Unsworth at Edinburgh International Book Festival

== Personal life ==
Forrest was in a relationship with actor Colin Farrell, whom she met in 2008. She refers to him in her memoir as "GH", short for "Gypsy Husband".

In June 2012, Forrest married Australian actor Ben Mendelsohn. They had one child together in 2014 and divorced in 2016.

She has been diagnosed with bipolar disorder and borderline personality disorder.

== Filmography ==
- Untogether (2017) (director, screenplay)
