= The Gaskets =

American synth-pop and rock duo

- Origin: Richmond, Virginia, US
- Genres: Synth-pop, rock
- Instrument: Yamaha_RM1x Music Sequencer
- Years active: 2001–08
- Label: Independent
- Members: Teddy Blanks; Ross Harman
- Website: www.thegaskets.com

The Gaskets was an American synth-pop/rock duo formed in Richmond, Virginia in 2001 by Teddy Blanks (vocals, keyboards) and Ross Harman (sequencer, guitar). Known for their frenetic stage presence and high-energy songs, Gaskets released two studio albums, and frequently performed in Richmond, New York City and Washington DC.

The Gaskets broke up in April 2008.

Harman committed suicide on 6 September 2010.

== Discography ==
=== Big Fun (2003) ===
The Gaskets' first studio LP, Big Fun, was released in early 2003. Reviews of their debut drew comparisons to bands like They Might Be Giants, Sparks, and Beck.

=== Loose Change (2006) ===
The Gaskets' second album, Loose Change, deals with the concept of money (most notably, not having any). The CD was released in January 2006. It was well received by many music blogs, landing it a spot on a few Top 10 Lists for 2006

== Other works ==
=== Music videos ===
The Gaskets' have commissioned multiple music videos, including "Hold Steady Hot Weather", directed by Lena Dunham, and "Eiffel Tower", directed by Grier Hillman Dill. The latter was an official selection in the 2007 SXSW Film Festival Other music videos include a stop-motion video by band-mate Ross Harman for "Left Hand".

=== Loose Change Live (2007) ===
To celebrate the release of their second album, The Gaskets invited Richmond, Virginia-based filmmaker Joe Carabeo to record their release show at local club The Nanci Raygun in January 2006. Featured on stage with The Gaskets was a live backing band formed by local musicians integral in the recording of the album. The sold-out show was edited by Carabeo into the concert film Loose Change Live. The DVD was released the following year.

== Trivia ==
The band has been the opening act for artists including Violent Femmes, Mudhoney, Aaron Carter, Monica, Daniel Johnston, Girl Talk, and "Weird Al" Yankovic.
