= Charlotte Olympia =

British luxury shoe and accessories brand

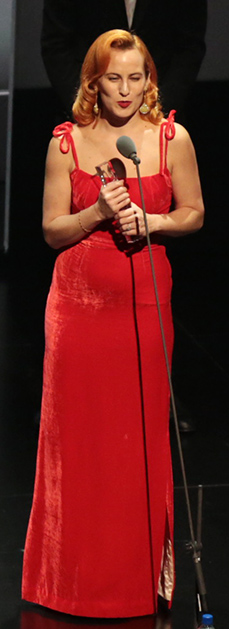
- Dellal in 2015
- Industry: Shoes and accessories
- Founded: 2008; 18 years ago in London, England
- Founder: Charlotte Olympia Dellal
- Area served: Global

Charlotte Olympia is a British luxury shoe and accessories brand founded by Charlotte Olympia Dellal in 2008.

== History ==
Dellal launched her label right after graduating from London College of Fashion, where she studied product development and footwear. Her first footwear collection was presented during London Fashion Week in February 2008. In 2010, Charlotte Olympia opened its first store on Maddox Street in London, followed by two stores in New York and Los Angeles. Starting in 2014, the brand opened many more stores worldwide, including in Miami, Hong Kong, and Dubai.

== Brand ==
Charlotte Olympia's designs are influenced by classical Hollywood cinema glamour, pin-ups and movie stars from the 1940s and 50s.

The brand has become known for the "island" platform Dolly pump, the Kitty flat and Perspex Pandora clutch box. Although primarily focused on footwear and accessories for women, the label also produces a collection for little girls called 'Incy' and the Tom Cat smoking slipper for men.

Her logo is a spider web design placed under the shoe sole.

== Awards ==
=== 2008 ===
- NewGen sponsorship by the British Fashion Council.

=== 2010 ===
- Footwear News Achievement Awards, Emerging Designer of the Year.

=== 2011 ===
- British Fashion Awards, Accessory Designer of the Year.

=== 2012 ===
- Glamour Women of the Year, Accessory Designer of the Year.
- Footwear News Achievement Awards, Designer of the Year.
- WGSN Global Fashion Awards, Footwear and Accessories Designer Award.

=== 2014 ===
- Marie Claire Spain Prix de la Moda Awards, Accessory Designer of the Year.

=== 2015 ===
- Walpole Awards, British Brand Ambassador.
- British Fashion Awards, Accessory Designer of the Year.

== Designer biography ==
Charlotte Olympia Della was born on June 5, 1981, in Cape Town, South Africa, to a Brazilian model Andréa de Magalhães Vieira and a British property developer Guy Dellal, son of the property tycoon Jack Dellal.

Her sister is the model Alice Dellal. She lives in North Kensington, London with her husband, Maxim Crewe (m.2010) and has three sons.
