= Harley Viera-Newton =

British model and DJ

- Born: London, England
- Occupations: Model, DJ
- Years active: 2007–present
- Modeling information
- Agency: Roc Nation
- Website: www.harleyvieranewton.com

Harley Viera-Newton is a British model and DJ, known for her spreads in magazines like Vogue and Elle, and appearing at clubs such as Westway, The Jane, Avenue, and Le Bain at the Standard Hotel NYC.

== Early life and education ==
Newton was born in London to a record executive father, who is president of Columbia Records Group, and a Brazilian model mother, who is a partner in the Tom Binns jewelry company and sister to Andrea Dellal. She is also the older sister of Rio Viera-Newton, a beauty writer for The Strategist. Newton's cousins are Alex, Max, Charlotte, and Alice Dellal. She spent her early childhood in the UK, but moved to Los Angeles at age 10. After graduating from Crossroads School, she attended New York University's Gallatin School of Individualized Study. While double-majoring in social science and egyptology at NYU, Newton began her career as a DJ in the New York City nightlife, spinning regularly at hotspots like Beatrice Inn, Lit Lounge, Avenue, and the Jane Hotel. Lit co-owner Erik Foss credited Newton with "help[ing] us turn the whole bar around." Also while at NYU, Newton was the bass player for New York punk band Lissy Trullie, fronted by lead singer and former model Elizabeth McChesney.

== Career ==
While still attending NYU, Newton signed with Next Model Management, and shot major campaigns for top brands like Uniqlo and DKNY. She became the in-house DJ for the House of Dior's Dior Beauty, as well as a beauty ambassador for the brand. Fresh off her NYU graduation in 2011, Newton signed a management deal with hip hop mogul Jay Z's record label and entertainment company Roc Nation, joining megastars like J. Cole and Rihanna.

Viera-Newton has also been featured in campaigns for brands like Araks (shot by Alexa Chung), Net-A-Porter, Printemps, Cole Haan, and Hermes. She has also held multiple brand liaison positions for global companies like Target, Juicy Couture, and Dior, all leading up to the launch of her own website HarleyVieraNewton.com.
