= Jasmine Dellal =

British-born film director and producer

- Born: Jasmine Dellal; United Kingdom
- Occupations: Film director, producer, screenwriter, film editor
- Parent(s): Jack Dellal; Katya Douglas
- Website: http://www.littledust.com/

Jasmine Dellal's Movie Gypsy Caravan
- Origin: UK, US, India

Jasmine Dellal is a British-born film director and producer.

== Early life ==
Jasmine Dellal is an independent film director and producer whose feature documentaries show in cinemas, festivals and TV around the world.

Dellal grew up in Great Britain, studied at Oxford University, then in the United States and still spends much time in South India where her grandparents lived near Arunachala mountain in Tiruvannamalai. Dellal read Modern Languages at Oxford University (French and Spanish, Balliol College). She met her mentor, the filmmaker Marlon Riggs while doing a Masters at the University of California at Berkeley.

== Career ==
In the 1990s, while based in San Francisco, Dellal founded Little Dust Productions, to make documentaries and artistic films with a social conscience. She has since moved to New York and London. She is particularly recognized for her work with Roma ("Gypsy" people). While visiting her mother in India, with her young son, Jasmine saw how a local farm school was challenging education traditions and finding progressive ways to include and adapt to their students. This inspired Dellal's ongoing film project - as of 2026, this work continues alongside her son's education.

== Films ==
- When the Road Bends… Tales of a Gypsy Caravan
- American Gypsy: A Stranger in Everybody's Land
- Freedom Writers
- Utopia in Four Movements (producer)
- Searching for the Fourth Nail by George Eli (executive producer)

== Film awards ==
- 2008 Albert Maysles Award for Excellence – Mendocino Film Festival for When the Road Bends: Tales of a Gypsy Caravan
- 2007 AUDIENCE AWARD winner – San Francisco Independent Film Fest for When the Road Bends: Tales of a Gypsy Caravan
- 2007 Impact of Music JURY AWARD winner – Nashville Independent Film Festival for When the Road Bends: Tales of a Gypsy Caravan
- 2007 KOREA -Jeonju International Film Festival – Audience Award for When the Road Bends: Tales of a Gypsy Caravan
- Flanders International Film Festival: Audience Award for When the Road Bends: Tales of a Gypsy Caravan
- 2000 San Francisco International Film Festival Golden Spire Award for American Gypsy: A Stranger in Everybody's Land
- 1999 Atlanta Film Festival Jury Award for American Gypsy: A Stranger in Everybody's Land

== See also ==
- Suzanne Dellal Centre for Dance and Theatre, Tel Aviv
