= Gaby Dellal =

British actress, film director and writer

- Born: 1961 (age 64–65); London, England
- Occupations: Actress, film director, writer
- Years active: 1985–present
- Spouse: Eric Fellner (? - ?)
- Children: 3
- Parent: Jack Dellal (father)

Gaby Dellal (born 1961) is a British actress, film director and writer. She was born in London.

== Career ==
In 2015, Dellal directed 3 Generations, a movie about a transgender teen boy played by Elle Fanning whose decision to start hormone therapy causes conflict with his mother, played by Naomi Watts and grandmother, played by Susan Sarandon. Dellal came under controversy for an interview she gave before the film's release during which she referred to the character Ray, played by Fanning, using female pronouns and referring to the character as "a girl who is presenting in a very ineffectual way as a boy." Dellal later stated that she used female pronouns because she was referring to the actress Fanning, not the character, when she made the remark. The film was distributed by The Weinstein Company in May 2017.

== Personal life ==
Dellal was previously married to producer Eric Fellner, with whom she has three sons.

== Selected filmography ==
=== Director ===
- On a Clear Day (2005)
- Angels Crest (2011)
- Leaving (2012)
- 3 Generations (2015)

=== Writer ===
- Tube Tales (1999)
- 3 Generations (2015)

=== Actress ===
- Dempsey and Makepeace (1985)
- Zina (1985)
- Robin Hood (1986)
- 'Allo 'Allo! (1986)
- Floodtide (1987)
- Hard Cases (1988)
- K2 (1991)
