= Elisa Sednaoui =

French-Italian-Egyptian model and actress

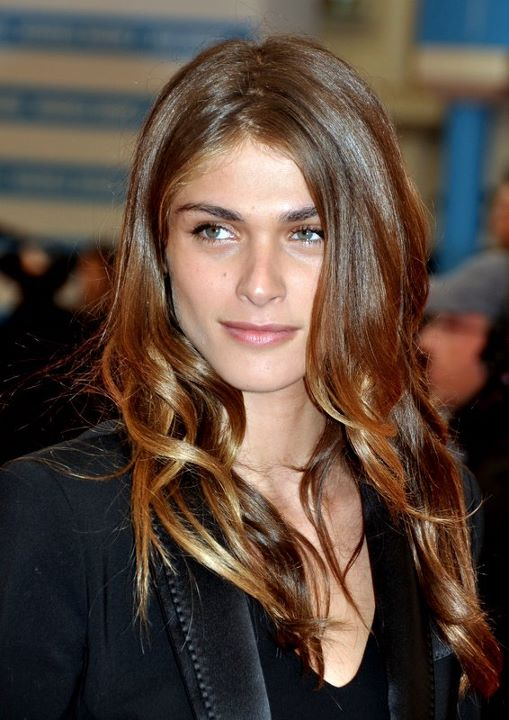
- Sednaoui in 2011
- Born: December 14, 1987 (age 38); Savigliano, Piedmont, Italy
- Occupations: Model, actress, film director, philanthropist, social entrepreneur and best-selling author
- Spouse: Alexander Dellal (m. 2014)
- Children: 2
- Relatives: Stéphane Sednaoui (uncle)
- Modeling information
- Height: 1.75 m (5 ft 9 in)
- Agency: IMG Models (New York, Los Angeles, Sydney); ZZO (Paris); Elite Model Management (Milan); Storm Model Management (London); Uno Models (Barcelona); IMM Bruxelles (Brussels); 2pm Model Management (Copenhagen); Modellink (Gothenburg)

Elisa Sednaoui (born December 14, 1987) is a social entrepreneur, best-selling author and philanthropist, who began her professional career as a model, actress and film director, of Syrian, Italian, Egyptian, and French descent. She has appeared in such films as Eastern Drift, La Baie du renard, Bus Palladium, Les Gamins, and Remember Now, as well as in fashion campaigns for Chanel Eyewear, Giorgio Armani, Missoni, Roberto Cavalli, Lancôme and Buccellati. In 2013, she created the Elisa Sednaoui Foundation, dedicated to promoting creative learning, after-school initiatives for youngsters. The organization has expanded and exists today both as a social enterprise and a Nonprofit. Funtasia Impact, a UK Nonprofit organization, is active in Italy since 2016 through the entity Funtasia Italia and in the United States, Funtasia Impact USA is a registered 501c3 founded in 2020. Sednaoui also founded and directs Funtasia Enterprise, a USA Benefit corporation, focusing on for profit educational products for parents and teachers and consultancies for schools and museums. In May 2022, Sednaoui released her first book, co-written with Linguistic Intelligence expert Paolo Borzacchiello, which became an instant best-seller in Italy.

== Family and early life ==
Elisa Sednaoui was born in Savigliano, Piedmont, Italy and raised between three countries, Egypt, Italy, and France. She spent much of her early life in Luxor and Zamalek, Cairo. Her mother, Anna Morra, was of Italian and Syrian heritage, while her father, Olivier Sednaoui, has Egyptian, Syrian and French roots. The Sednaoui family, a Melkite Greek Catholic family of Syrian descent, finds its roots in the city of Sednaya, from where their surname originates. The Sednaoui family migrated to Egypt at the end of the 19th century and developed successful department stores in Cairo.

== Film ==
Sednaoui's first feature film, Šarūnas Bartas' Eastern Drift was released in Paris in December 2010. She played the lead female role of "Gabriella", alongside Bartas. The film was shown at La Berlinale 2010 – section "The International Forum of New Cinema." In La Baie du Renard, a short film selected to close Critics Week (Semaine de la Critique) at Cannes Film Festival 2009, Sednaoui starred alongside Pierre Torreton

In 2010 she starred in French screens in Christopher Thompson's first feature film Bus Palladium, co-starring with Marc André Grondin and Arthur Dupont. Sednaoui also starred opposite French actor Pascal Greggory in Karl Lagerfeld's short film Remember Now, the introduction to the 2010 Chanel Cruise Collection.

Sednaoui has also appeared in Love Lasts Three Years, released by Europa in January 2012, and The Legend of Kaspar Hauser, a surrealistic adaptation of the 19th century Teutonic foundling story transposed to Sardinia.

== Directorial work ==
Sednaoui co-directed with Martina Gili the documentary Kullu Tamam (Everything is Good). The film showcases Egyptians not covered by mainstream media by telling the stories of characters who, despite their differences of age and belief, share the sudden discovery of what is usually referred to as "freedom of expression". The film depicts the countryside of Luxor. Gili and Sednaoui co-directed a music video for music producer Chaim's song "Robots on Meth", which was initially exclusively released on Interview.com. Sednaoui also directed "In Conversation With Vogue Arabia" the first short film to ever be featured on the online version of Vogue Arabia, starring Lebanese designers Elie Saab. The short film was part of the Official Selection of 2017 edition of London Fashion Film Festival, Berlin Fashion Film Festival, Milano Fashion Film Festival, Istanbul Fashion Film Fest, Copenhagen Fashion Film and Aesthetica Short Film Festival.

== Selected filmography ==
| Year | Title | Role | Notes |
|---|---|---|---|
| 2010 | Bus Palladium | Laura | Directed by Christopher Thompson |
| 2010 | Eastern Drift | Gabriella | Original title: Indigène d'Eurasie. Directed by Šarūnas Bartas |
| 2012 | L'amour dure trois ans | Anne | By Frédéric Beigbeder |
| 2012 | La leggenda di Kaspar Hauser | The Lost Girl | By Davide Manuli. Featuring Vincent Gallo |
| 2013 | Les gamins | Irène | By Anthony Marciano. Featuring Max Boublil, Alain Chabat |
| 2013 | The Liberator | Fanny du Villars | By Alberto Arvelo. Featuring Edgar Ramirez, Danny Huston |
| 2014 | Soap Opera | Francesca | |

== Social enterprise ==
Funtasia Enterprise is a California Benefit corporation founded in 2020 offering a range of educational services to schools, institutions, to parents and caregivers, including capacity building training, classes and workshops, as well as online resources. Funtasia developed an Educational Approach which is a socio-emotional, experiential and community-based learning and teaching method that can be applied to most subjects. This proprietary Approach is the result of research and testing in more than 4 countries and languages. It is designed to enhance youth and adults' educational experience towards transversal, relational and creative soft skill sets. The tools used include hands-on activities covering cognitive intelligence and sense awareness – carried out through games, independent projects and layered conversations with instructors and peers that reflect the lessons. The Approach is expressed practically in a deliberately sequenced Learning Arch© used for all Funtasia programs, from the Adults Training, to the youth programs and digital products. Activities are built to help young people and adults strengthen their social and self-awareness, as well as the growth and solution oriented mindset, while allowing them to gain the courage to fully embrace the path towards exploring and celebrating their inner strengths.Funtasia Enterprise currently has a physical presence in 5 countries as well as global online accessibility. Some of its most recent collaborations took place in the USA with UCLA School of Education and Information Studies for a teacher professional development, with Larchmont Charter School on a cross-cultural online workshop. Funtasia Enterprise also collaborated with the Diriyah Contemporary Art Biennale in Saudi Arabia.

== Nonprofit ==
In 2013, Sednaoui created the Elisa Sednaoui Foundation, a nonprofit organization providing creative learning after-school programs for youngsters. The foundation's pilot program, a music workshop for youngsters in Luxor, Egypt, took place in April, 2014. During a full school-week, local youngsters attended the workshop (organized with the support of Makan—the Egyptian Center For Culture and Arts—and fellow NPO MIMA Music), which consisted in creative, game-like activities that helped them write and record a full song. The foundation has since taken on the name Funtasia Impact, its main project. It is registered as a UK charitable incorporated organization (CIO). It offers underserved communities youth programs and educators building capacity. It is active in Italy through the entity Funtasia Italia founded in 2016 and in the United States, Funtasia Impact USA is registered 501c3 as of 2020.

Funtasia Impact currently has physical presence in 24 cities around the world, as well as global digital presence. To date, it has impacted 11291 Youth ages 4–18 and involved over 1500 adults globally. Its indirect beneficiaries through partnership such as the one with Save The Children Italy have reached over 50000 individuals.

=== Egypt ===
Funtasia manages its own center in Luxor, Egypt, where youth classes, workshops and adult training programs are implemented. Additionally it works through partnerships with Sawiris Foundation, the Swiss Embassy in Egypt, Right to Play, and A.P.E. in Esna, Assiut, Mokattam, Cairo, Haram City.

=== Mexico ===
Funtasia Impact was invited by the Xalapa municipality to build capacity of over 30 adults from the community, and to run 2 workshops for 600 students of public school Escuela Mexico. Renowned Italian photographer Laura Sciacovelli and Mexican film director Moises Aisemberg also joined community educators and creatives.

=== Italy ===
Funtasia works with public schools in the cities of Bra, Savigliano, Torino. In collaboration with the Public Schools Board of education, Funtasia provides courses to develop essential life skills with a focus on authentic expression and self-confidence, interior and exterior wellness, connections and empathy with others.

In partnership with Caffè Vergnano, Funtasia developed an Educational program on entrepreneurship and gender inclusion for two high school classes, involving about 50 students, with an additional 500 online participants. The program included activities focused on life skills, personal development, gender assumptions, bias, and gender gaps.

The organization has been working with SAVE THE CHILDREN Italy since 2016 to build capacity of Save the Children educators working in Punti Luce centers across Italy, in Napoli, Roma Ostia, Roma Torre Maura, Roma Ponte di Nona Udine, Genova, Milano Giambellino, Prato, Bari, Torino, Palermo Zen, Palermo Zisa, Sassari (Italy). The most recent project they collaborated on was called "Equip today to thrive tomorrow" (ET3) and financed by Accenture Foundation, in collaboration with Save the Children USA. The project is carried out in Italy and simultaneously in 5 other countries around the world and over the 3 years will reach approximately 44,000 beneficiaries, including children and youth and 3,000 parents, teachers, facilitators and educators. ET3's main objective is to develop the human and digital skills of children (aged 8 to 14) with a high level of awareness of their needs with a focus on growth mindset and creativity in a perspective of gender inclusion.

Since 2015, Elisa is also a high profile supporter of UNHCR, with a first visit in Lebanon in 2016 and follow up visits to a Syrian refugee family legally relocated in Italy. She has also visited a refugee center located in Xalapa, Mexico in 2020.

== Fashion ==
In addition to film, Sednaoui has appeared in campaigns for Chanel Eyewear, Giorgio Armani and a Roberto Cavalli fragrance campaign in February 2012, shot by Steven Klein for print and Johan Renck for television. In December 2015 she collaborated with Oscar-winning director Paolo Sorrentino on his campaign for Missoni Fragrance. Before his death during February 2019, Sednaoui served as a muse to Karl Lagerfeld.

She also worked extensively with photographer Peter Lindbergh, particularly for the multi-years contract with italian Jewelry brand Buccellati and the fashion brand Ermanno Scervino in 2016 and 2017.

In 2019, Christian Louboutin launched a new handbag model that he named "Elisa" after his Goddaughter and muse.

Sednaoui has been featured on the cover of magazines such as Italian Vogue, Vogue Arabia, Vanity Fair italia, Glamour Italia, L'Officiel, Flair, Marie Claire and Elle, among others.

== Written work ==
Nessuno Può Farti Star Male Senza Il Tuo Permesso (Nobody Can Hurt You Without Your Permission), the first book she co-wrote with Italian linguistic intelligence expert Paolo Borzacchiello, through cognitive behavioral tools supports the building of self-esteem, self-awareness and confidence in the interactions with others.

=== Book ===
- Borzacchiello, Sednaoui (2022). Nessuno può farti star male senza il tuo permesso, Mondadori, ISBN 9788804755333

=== Articles ===
- https://www.huffpost.com/entry/where-i-see-myself-in-ten-years_b_7322028

== Personal life ==
In May 2014, Sednaoui married British businessman Alexander Dellal. Dellal is the grandchild of billionaire Jack Dellal. They have together two sons, Jack Zeitoun in 2013, and Samuel Luxor in 2017.

Stéphane Sednaoui is her uncle.

== See also ==
- Qasr el-Nil Street

== Bibliography ==
- search using Google, criteria "when Elisa Sednaoui was married"
