= Happy Hours (film) =

- Directed by: Katie Holmes
- Written by: Katie Holmes
- Produced by: Celine Rattray; Trudie Styler; Peter Coleman; Paula P. Manzanedo
- Starring: Katie Holmes; Joshua Jackson; Mary-Louise Parker; Joe Tippett; Constance Wu
- Cinematography: Michael McDonough
- Edited by: Ian Blume
- Music by: Norah Jones
- Production companies: STX Films; Maven Screen Media; Bond Street Station
- Release date: June 6, 2026 (Tribeca Festival)
- Running time: 80 minutes
- Country: United States
- Language: English

Happy Hours is a 2026 American romantic dramedy film written and directed by Katie Holmes. It stars Holmes, Joshua Jackson, Mary-Louise Parker, Joe Tippett, and Constance Wu.

The film premiered at the Tribeca Festival on June 6, 2026.

== Cast ==
- Katie Holmes as Liz Jones, a recently divorced photojournalist
  - Johnna Dias-Watson as young Liz
- Joshua Jackson as Andrew McCloud, a travel writer and Liz's former lover
  - Jack Martin as young Andrew
- Joe Tippett as one of Andrew's best friends
- John McGinty as one of Andrew's best friends
- Donald Webber Jr.
- Chloë Kerwin
- Mary-Louise Parker as Liz's aunt
- Constance Wu as Liz's agent

== Production ==
In July 2025, it was announced that Katie Holmes would write, direct, and star in a romantic comedy-drama film titled Happy Hours, which is conceived as a trilogy, with Joshua Jackson, Mary-Louise Parker, Joe Tippett, and Constance Wu also starring. In April 2026, the first film was selected to screen at the Tribeca Festival.

Norah Jones was hired to compose the score for the film, in her film scoring debut.

== Release ==
Happy Hours premiered at the Tribeca Festival on June 6, 2026.
