= David Bergstein =

American film producer

- Born: David Rafael Bergstein; August 9, 1962 (age 64); Brooklyn, New York City, US
- Education: New York University (BS)
- Occupations: Film producer; investment banker; real estate developer
- Years active: 1984–2015

David Rafael Bergstein (born 1962) is an American former financier and film producer. He started his career in real estate development before opening a business advisory firm focused on distressed assets and high-growth companies. He branched out into independent film production between 2003 and 2010. In 2016, Bergstein was arrested on charges of defrauding $26 million from investors. He was found guilty in 2018 and sentenced to eight years in prison.

== Early life and education ==
Bergstein was born in Brooklyn, New York and grew up with his father Leonard Bergstein, an engineering professor, inventor and Holocaust survivor.

After graduating high school early, Bergstein went on to receive a BS with a concentration in pre-medicine and mathematics at Polytechnic Institute of New York University. He also later attended the Benjamin N. Cardozo School of Law. During his time in law school, Bergstein went on to become a research analyst, first for Salomon Brothers and then for Bear Stearns, where he specialized in the analysis of troubled or undervalued companies.

== Career ==
After relocating to Los Angeles in 1984, Bergstein made a career buying and selling real estate, which later transitioned into real estate development. By the 1990s, he shifted his business focus to acquiring or advising on distressed operating companies and debt. He later founded the Cyrano Group, a private equity and advisory firm, where he was CEO.

In 2003, Bergstein and business partner Ron Tutor loaned money to Franchise Pictures, a film production company headed by Elie Samaha. When the company went bankrupt, Bergstein and Tutor became owners of dozens of Franchise's films. By 2006, they had also acquired Capitol Films and ThinkFilm, in the process becoming major players in the independent film sector.

In March 2010, fourteen creditors attempting to force the five companies controlled by Bergstein and Tutor into Chapter 11 bankruptcy were granted an emergency motion by a court to have an interim trustee appointed to oversee the companies. Capitol Films and ThinkFilm were formally declared bankrupt by a federal judge in October 2010, and Bergstein's remaining three companies—R2D2, CT-1 Holdings and Capco—in 2011. One of the creditors that had forced Bergstein's companies into bankruptcy, Aramid Entertainment Fund, had its claims against Bergstein's companies dismissed in 2012 — a judgment that was upheld by an appellate court in 2013. In 2012, the former in-house counsel for Capitol Films, who had left the company to work for Aramid, was successfully sued by Bergstein for breach of fiduciary trust and malpractice and ordered to pay $50 million in damages to Bergstein. In 2014, another creditor, Screen Capital International, had its claims rejected by a federal judge. Lawyers successfully argued that it was not a legitimate creditor because it had purchased the claims from another entity. The U.S. District and Bankruptcy Courts dismissed the outstanding involuntary bankruptcy cases in 2016.

Bergstein also took an advisory role in the sale of Miramax in 2010 to an investor group that included his partner, Tutor. The purchase, for $660 million, included the rights to more than 700 library titles. In 2012, Bergstein sued the owners of Miramax, alleging they had reneged on paying him a $6.1 million fee and a 3.33 percent stake as compensation for his role in the acquisition. The litigation ended two weeks later when Bergstein and Miramax reached a settlement.

On November 9, 2016, Bergstein was arrested at his Hidden Hills, California, home after being indicted for fraud, and was convicted by a federal jury on March 1, 2018, of defrauding investors out of $26 million. In June 2018, he was sentenced to eight years in prison and ordered to pay a $250,000 fine. Bergstein cried as he requested leniency, but United States federal judge P. Kevin Castel said his crimes needed to be "punished severely" to "send a message".

== Personal life ==
In 2011, Bergstein, along with his wife Sara, formally dedicated the Conejo Jewish Academy's adult education program to Bergstein's father, naming the program "Leonard Bergstein Jewish Academy."

Bergstein is on the board of the Sheriff's Youth Foundation, a youth program run by the Los Angeles County Sheriff's Department, and the board of the Grossman Burn Foundation, a nonprofit organization supporting burn survivors and their families.

Bergstein is also a featured contributor for Huffington Post, the Times of Israel, the Algemeiner online newspaper, and other periodicals.

== Selected filmography ==
Bergstein has been involved in films including:

- 2015 - In the Heart of the Sea (executive producer)
- 2010 – Love Ranch (producer, uncredited)
- 2010 – 6 Souls (executive producer)
- 2010 – Father of Invention (executive producer)
- 2009 – Black Water Transit (executive producer)
- 2008 – $5 a Day (executive producer)
- 2008 – The Edge of Love (executive producer)
- 2008 – Blackout (executive producer)
- 2007 – Before the Devil Knows You're Dead (executive producer)
- 2006 – .45 (producer)
- 2006 – Alpha Male (producer)
- 2006 – Bordertown (producer)
- 2005 – Chaos (executive producer)
- 2005 – The Wendell Baker Story (executive producer)
- 2005 – Dead Fish (producer)
- 2005 – The Whole Ten Yards (executive producer)
- 2004 – Laws of Attraction (producer)
- 2004 – Spartan (producer)
