= Alpha male (disambiguation) =

The alpha male in groups of animals is the most dominant male of its social group.

Alpha male may also refer to:

- Alpha and beta male, slang terms for men
- Alpha Male (film), a 2006 American-British drama film
- Alpha Males (TV series), a 2022 Spanish comedy television series
- Team Alpha Male, an American martial arts gym in Sacramento, California
- Monty Brown, a wrestler nicknamed "The Alpha Male"
- Dan Kelly and the Alpha Males, an Australian rock band
- "Alpha Male" (Doctors), a 2003 television episode
- "Alpha Male", a song by Anthrax from their 1998 album, Volume 8: The Threat Is Real
