= ThinkFilm =

Defunct American film distribution company

- Type: Subsidiary
- Industry: Motion pictures
- Founded: September 2001; 25 years ago
- Defunct: October 5, 2010; 16 years ago
- Fate: Bankruptcy And Liquidation
- Headquarters: New York City, New York, U.S.
- Parent: Capitol Films
- Divisions: Velocity Home Entertainment

ThinkFilm (stylized as TH!NKFilm) was an American film distribution company founded in September 2001. It had been a division of David Bergstein’s Capitol Films since 2006.

On October 5, 2010, five of Bergstein's companies in the film industry — Capitol Films, ThinkFilm, R2D2, CT-1, and Capco — were forced into Chapter 11 bankruptcy by a group of creditors led by the Aramid Entertainment film investment fund seeking payment for outstanding debts of $16 million.

== Films distributed ==
Title	Release date
Time Out	March 29, 2002
World Traveler	April 19, 2002
The Mystic Masseur	May 3, 2002
The Dangerous Lives of Altar Boys	June 14, 2002
The Last Kiss	August 16, 2002
Love in the Time of Money	November 1, 2002
Gerry	February 14, 2003
Spellbound	April 30, 2003
Overnight	June 12, 2003
The Heart of Me	June 26, 2003
Julius Caesar	June 29, 2003
Teknolust	August 22, 2003
The Gospel of John	September 26, 2003
The Event	October 3, 2003
Bus 174	October 8, 2003
Love, Sex and Eating the Bones	March 5, 2004
Wilbur Wants to Kill Himself	March 12, 2004
The Agronomist	April 23, 2004
Still, We Believe: The Boston Red Sox Movie	May 7, 2004
The Story of the Weeping Camel	June 4, 2004
Festival Express	July 23, 2004
Bright Young Things	August 20, 2004
Going Upriver: The Long War of John Kerry	October 1, 2004
Primer	October 8, 2004
Born into Brothels	December 8, 2004
The Assassination of Richard Nixon	December 29, 2004
Mondovino	March 23, 2005
Dallas 362	April 10, 2005
Tell Them Who You Are	May 13, 2005
Genesis	May 27, 2005
Kontroll	May 27, 2005
5x2	June 10, 2005
The Last Mogul: The Life and Times of Lew Wasserman	June 24, 2005
Murderball	July 22, 2005
The Aristocrats	August 12, 2005
The Untold Story of Emmett Louis Till	August 17, 2005
Where the Truth Lies	October 2, 2005
Three of Hearts: A Postmodern Family	October 19, 2005
Protocols of Zion	October 21, 2005
I Love Your Work	November 4, 2005
Lie with Me	November 11, 2005
The Boys of Baraka	November 30, 2005
Fateless	January 6, 2006
The Zodiac	March 17, 2006
The Big Question	March 17, 2006
When Do We Eat?	April 7, 2006
95 Miles to Go	April 7, 2006
Down in the Valley	May 5, 2006
The King	May 5, 2006
Loverboy	June 16, 2006
Strangers with Candy	June 28, 2006
I Like Killing Flies	July 28, 2006
10th & Wolf	August 18, 2006
Looking for Kitty	September 1, 2006
Half Nelson	September 22, 2006
Keeping Mum	October 6, 2006
Shortbus	October 20, 2006
Tideland	October 27, 2006
Fuck	November 10, 2006
Candy	November 17, 2006
10 Items or Less	December 1, 2006
Off the Black	December 8, 2006
Funny Money	January 26, 2007
Farce of the Penguins	January 30, 2007
Poor Boy's Game	February 11, 2007
Glastonbury	February 23, 2007
Gangsta Rap: The Glockumentary	March 2, 2007
The Killing Floor	March 14, 2007
Life Free or Die	March 30, 2007
The TV Set	April 6, 2007
A New Wave	April 7, 2007
Zoo	April 25, 2007
Avenue Montaigne	April 27, 2007
The Dog Problem	April 27, 2007
The Wendell Baker Story	May 18, 2007
The Trails of Darryl Hunt	June 15, 2007
The Ten	August 3, 2007
The Hottest State	August 24, 2007
Self Medicated	August 31, 2007
In the Shadow of the Moon	September 7, 2007
Lake of Fire	October 3, 2007
Before the Devil Knows You're Dead	October 26, 2007
War/Dance	November 9, 2007
The Walker	December 7, 2007
Nanking	December 12, 2007
Taxi to the Dark Side	January 18, 2008
The Air I Breathe	January 25, 2008
Alpha Male	March 18, 2008
My Brother Is an Only Child	March 28, 2008
Then She Found Me	April 25, 2008
The Tracey Fragments	May 9, 2008
Noise	May 9, 2008
Stuck	May 30, 2008
Encounters at the End of the World	June 11, 2008
Roman Polanski: Wanted and Desired	July 11, 2008
Young People Fucking	August 29, 2008
Good	December 31, 2008
Incendiary	February 6, 2009
Phoebe in Wonderland	March 6, 2009
Five Dollars a Day	April 24, 2009
