= Studio Mao =

American film production company

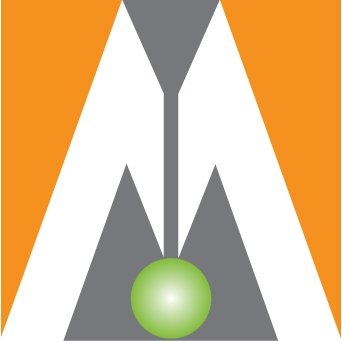
- Logo since 2006
- Industry: Motion picture
- Founded: October 2006
- Headquarters: New York City, New York
- Services: Film Production
- Website: https://studiomao.com

Studio Mao, is an American independent film production company. It was founded October 23, 2006 in the State of New York, United States. In 2018 an office in the Voentorg building at 10, Vozdvizhenka Street was opened in Moscow, Russia.

Studio Mao produced the short drama film Skin by director Guy Nattiv and producer Jaime Ray Newman in association with New Native Pictures. The film was acquired by Fox Searchlight and won an Oscar ® in the category of Best Live Action Short at the 91st Academy Awards.

== Filmography ==
- Tracks (TBA)
- Solo (2022)
- A Mouthful of Air (2021)
- Warning (2021)
- Driveways (2019)
- Skin (2018 Feature Film)
- Skin (2018 Short Film)
- The Kindergarten Teacher (2018)
- Wildling (2018)
- Freak Show (2017)
- The Man Who Saved the World (2014)
- Filth (2013)

== Upcoming Projects ==
Studio Mao produced and is packaging the documentary film Solo directed by Olga Pankratova filmed in Russia, France, Germany and Poland. The film follows six dancers in the genres of Classical Ballet, Vogue, Contemporary, experimental hip-hop, pole dance, and Krump. The Solo world premiere in Moscow, Russia was February 14, 2022 at the October Cinema. Russia World Vision acquired Russia/CIS rights in advance of the premiere.
