= Celine Rattray =

British film producer (born 1975)

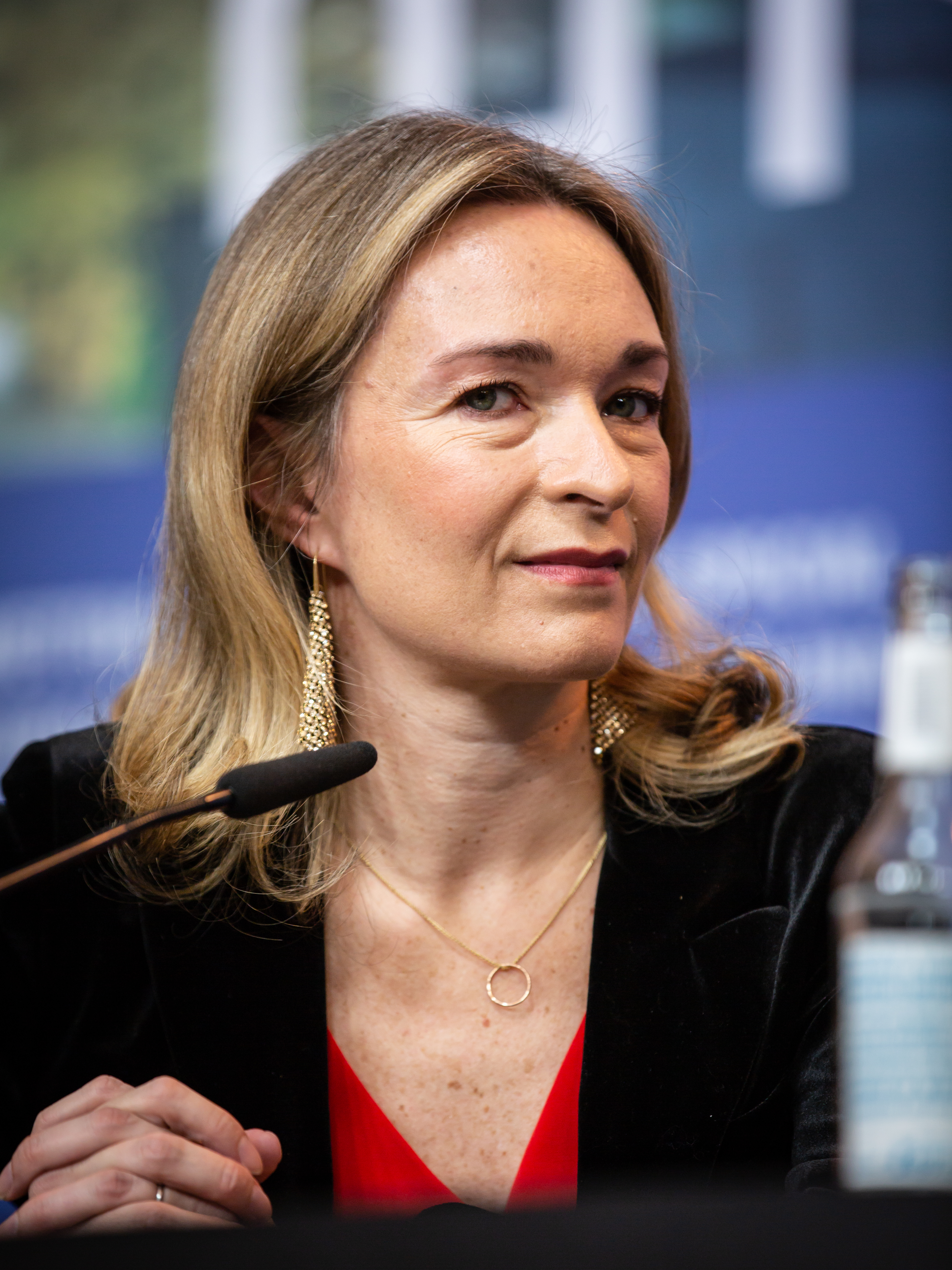
Celine Rattray at the Berlin Film Festival 2019

Celine Rattray (born 1975) is an English film producer who co-founded the production company Maven Pictures. In 2010, she won a Golden Globe Award and was nominated for an Academy Award for The Kids Are All Right. In 2020, she and Trudie Styler launched Maven Screen Media, a multi-platform UK production company.

== Career ==
Rattray earned a degree in mathematics and philosophy from St Hilda's College, Oxford prior to entering the entertainment industry.

In 2003, Rattray co-founded New York-based production company Plum Pictures with Galt Niederhoffer and Daniela Taplin Lundberg. The company produced several films before its 2009 disestablishment, including Grace Is Gone (2007), which won an Audience Award at the 2007 Sundance Film Festival.

She was president of Mandalay Vision, the independent film division of Mandalay Entertainment, until 2011. In that role she produced several films, including The Kids Are All Right (2010), for which she won the Golden Globe Award for Best Motion Picture – Musical or Comedy, the GLAAD Media Award for Outstanding Film – Wide Release, and was nominated for the Academy Award for Best Picture, Best Picture BAFTA, Gold Derby Award for Best Motion Picture, and Producers Guild of America Award for Best Theatrical Motion Picture. In the same year, she was nominated for the Canadian Screen Award for Best Motion Picture for The Whistleblower.

She left Mandalay Vision in 2011 to found Maven Pictures with Trudie Styler. In that role she was nominated for a Women's Image Network Award in 2017 for Novitiate, which was also shortlisted for the Sundance Film Festival Grand Jury Prize.

== Filmography ==
- Lonesome Jim (2005) - producer
- The Baxter (2005) - producer
- Return to Rajapur (2006) - producer
- Grace Is Gone (2007) - producer
- Dedication (2007) - producer
- Blue State (2007) - co-producer
- Watching the Detectives (2007) - producer
- Diminished Capacity (2008) - producer
- Birds of America (2008) - producer
- Trucker (2008) - producer
- Bart Got a Room (2008) - producer
- Life in Flight (2008) - producer
- New York, I Love You (2008) - executive producer
- The Winning Season (2009) - producer
- Labor Pains (2009) - producer
- After.Life (2009) - producer
- The Romantics (2010) - executive producer
- The Kids Are All Right (2010) - producer
- Everything Must Go (2010) - executive producer
- Vanishing on 7th Street (2010) - producer
- The Whistleblower (2010) - producer
- Another Happy Day (2011) - producer
- Salvation Boulevard (2011) - producer
- Bernie (2011) - producer
- Dark Tide (2012) - producer
- Girl Most Likely (2012) - producer
- Filth (2013) - producer
- Black Nativity (2013) - producer
- Still Alice (2014) - executive producer
- Matters of the Heart (2015) - producer
- 10,000 Saints (2015) - producer
- Miss You Already (2015) - executive producer
- American Honey (2016) - executive producer
- Anatomy of Violence (2016) - executive producer
- Novitiate (2017) - producer
- Freak Show (2017) - producer
- Kings (2017) - executive producer
- The Kindergarten Teacher (2018) - producer
- Wildling (2018) - producer
- Skin (2018) - producer
- Boarding School (2018) - producer
- Human Capital (2019) - producer
- With/In: Volume 1 (2021) - producer
- With/In: Volume 2 (2021) - producer
- Silent Night (2021) - producer
- A Mouthful of Air (2021) - producer
- Infinite Storm (2022) - producer
- Unicorns (2023) - producer
- Eleanor the Great (2025) - producer
- Happy Hours (2026) - producer
- Up Against It (2026) - producer
