= The Kindergarten Teacher (2018 film) =

2018 film

- Official poster
- Directed by: Sara Colangelo
- Screenplay by: Sara Colangelo
- Based on: The Kindergarten Teacher by Nadav Lapid
- Produced by: Talia Kleinhendler; Osnat Handelsman-Keren; Maggie Gyllenhaal; Celine Rattray; Trudie Styler
- Starring: Maggie Gyllenhaal; Parker Sevak; Anna Baryshnikov; Rosa Salazar; Michael Chernus; Gael García Bernal
- Cinematography: Pepe Avila del Pino
- Edited by: Marc Vives; Lee Percy
- Music by: Asher Goldshmidt
- Production companies: Pie Films; Maven Pictures; PaperChase Films; Studio Mao
- Distributed by: Netflix
- Release dates: January 19, 2018 (Sundance); October 12, 2018 (United States)
- Running time: 97 minutes
- Country: United States
- Language: English
- Budget: $2.4 million
- Box office: $552,188

The Kindergarten Teacher is a 2018 American drama film directed by Sara Colangelo. It is based on the 2014 Israeli film of the same name. It stars Maggie Gyllenhaal, Parker Sevak, Anna Baryshnikov, Rosa Salazar, Michael Chernus and Gael García Bernal. The film had its world premiere at the Sundance Film Festival on January 19, 2018. It was released on October 12, 2018, by Netflix in the United States and Canada.

== Plot ==
Lisa Spinelli, a kindergarten teacher from Staten Island, is struggling with feelings of dissatisfaction in her life. She is in a loving yet passionless marriage with her husband Grant, and her teenage children, Josh and Lainie, are distant with her. Lisa attends a poetry class every week, led by Simon, but her poetry is dismissed as derivative. One of Lisa's students, Jimmy, is routinely picked up late from school by his babysitter. One day, Lisa overhears Jimmy reciting a poem he wrote while he was waiting to be picked up. She later presents the poem as her own at her poetry class, where her classmates and Simon are struck by it and compliment her talent. Lisa decides that Jimmy is a prodigy, and begins to dedicate her time to nurturing his talent.

Lisa asks Jimmy's babysitter, a part-time actress named Becca, to write down the poems that Jimmy recites. Becca complies, but Lisa begins to feel that Becca treats Jimmy like a baby and that she is obstructing his ability to grow into his talent. Lisa gives Jimmy her phone number and tells him to call her any time that he has a poem. Simon invites Lisa to meet him, and tells her about a poetry reading in Manhattan, where she will have to read two of her poems in front of an audience. Lisa and Simon have sex, with Simon's attraction to Lisa being a by-product of what he believes to be her unique artistic genius.

Lisa meets Jimmy's father Nikhil and tells him about Jimmy's poetry. Although Nikhil is happy about his son's intellect, he wants Jimmy to have a normal, practical life. Lisa encourages Nikhil to fire Becca and offers to watch Jimmy for a few hours after school every day, which Nikhil gratefully accepts. One night, despite Nikhil's request that Jimmy be taken to baseball practice, Lisa takes him to the poetry reading instead, where his poetry is well received. Simon, however, is upset that Lisa lied about writing the poetry, and tells her to leave the class. Lisa and Jimmy return home late, and Lisa puts Jimmy to bed on her couch. The next day, Nikhil calls Lisa, angry at her for lying about the poetry reading and for not bringing him home afterwards, and informs her he will be taking Jimmy to another kindergarten.

The next morning, Lisa goes to Jimmy's house, and follows him to his new kindergarten, where she kidnaps him. They drive to a motel near a beach up north, where Lisa tells Jimmy of her plan to go across the border into Canada. Jimmy appears to be compliant with her plan, but while she's in the shower, he calls 911 and tells them he's been kidnapped. Lisa attempts to dissuade him, telling him that the world will never understand his talent, but gives Jimmy the address of their motel anyway while sobbing quietly in the bathroom. The police arrive and presumably arrest Lisa; they place Jimmy in the front seat of a squad car, where he says "I have a poem" but nobody hears him.

== Cast ==
- Maggie Gyllenhaal as Lisa Spinelli
- Parker Sevak as Jimmy Roy
- Michael Chernus as Grant Spinelli
- Gael García Bernal as Simon
- Anna Baryshnikov as Meghan
- Ajay Naidu as Nikhil Roy
- Rosa Salazar as Becca
- Sam Jules as Josh Spinelli
- Daisy Tahan as Lainie Spinelli
- Samrat Chakrabarti as Sanjay Roy

== Production ==
In May 2017, it was announced Maggie Gyllenhaal had been cast in the film, with Sara Colangelo directing from a screenplay she wrote, based upon the 2014 Israeli film of the same name. Trudie Styler, Celine Rattray, Gyllenhaal, Osnat Handelsman-Keren and Talia Kleinhendler will serve as producers on the film, under their Maven Pictures and Pie Films banners, respectively. In July 2017, Gael García Bernal, Rosa Salazar, Michael Chernus, Anna Baryshnikov, Daisy Tahan and Samrat Chakrabarti joined the cast of the film. Poets Kaveh Akbar, Dominique Townsend, and Ocean Vuong worked with Gyllenhaal and Colangelo to write poems for the film.

== Release ==
The film had its world premiere at the Sundance Film Festival on January 19, 2018. It was screened in the U.S. Dramatic Competition section at the 2018 Sundance Film Festival. Shortly after, Netflix acquired distribution rights to the film in the United States and Canada. It was released on October 12, 2018. It was screened at the Toronto International Film Festival on September 6, 2018. The film's international distribution is handled by Protagonist Pictures and Thunderbird Releasing in the United Kingdom.

== Reception ==
On the review aggregator website Rotten Tomatoes, 90% of 103 critics' reviews are positive, with an average rating of 7.5/10. The website's critical consensus reads, "Elevated by a bravura performance from Maggie Gyllenhaal, The Kindergarten Teacher is one American remake that retains its impact the second time around." On Metacritic, the film has a weighted average score of 75 out of 100, based on 21 critics, indicating "generally favorable reviews".

=== Accolades ===
Award	Date of ceremony	Category	Recipient(s) and nominee(s)	Result	Ref(s)
Sundance Film Festival	January 27, 2018	U.S. Dramatic: Grand Jury Prize Award	The Kindergarten Teacher	Nominated	
Sundance Film Festival	January 27, 2018	U.S. Dramatic: Directing	Sara Colangelo	Won	
