= Trudie Styler =

English actress and producer (born 1954)

- Styler at the Toronto Film Festival, 2026
- Born: 6 January 1954 (age 72); Bromsgrove, Worcestershire, England
- Education: Bristol Old Vic Theatre School
- Occupations: Actress; producer
- Years active: 1977–present
- Spouse: Sting (m. 1992)
- Children: 4, including Mickey and Eliot Sumner

Trudie Styler (born 6 January 1954) is an English actress, director, and film producer. She trained at the Bristol Old Vic Theatre School and has appeared in numerous stage, television, and film productions. Styler is also known for her work as a producer, contributing to films such as Lock, Stock and Two Smoking Barrels, Snatch, and A Mouthful of Air.

She has been married to musician Sting since 1992, and the couple have four children together. Beyond her entertainment career, Styler is a prominent environmental activist and co-founded the Rainforest Foundation Fund with Sting to support rainforest conservation and Indigenous communities.

== Early life and family ==
Styler was born in Bromsgrove, Worcestershire, the daughter of Pauline and Harry Styler, a farmer and factory worker. When Styler was two years old, she was hit by a van. She received severe facial injuries that left her badly scarred and required several plastic surgery operations up until the age of 18. Her classmates nicknamed her "scarface", which caused her to feel for many years that she was "not a very attractive person". She attended North Bromsgrove High School, where one of her teachers was the singer-songwriter Clifford T. Ward.

== Acting career ==
Styler trained at the Bristol Old Vic Theatre School and went on to appear in various period BBC productions. She joined the Royal Shakespeare Company, in which she played multiple major roles. Her theatre credits also include The Vagina Monologues, Twin Spirits, and The Seagull.

She has appeared in many British television series such as The Mayor of Casterbridge and The Scold's Bridle, and in the United States television shows Empire, The Night Of, Friends (S8 Ep10), and Falling Water.

Styler's film work includes Lifetime Television's Living Proof and Paul Haggis' The Next Three Days. She has also made seven mind-body fitness DVDs released by Gaia, Inc.

== Film production ==
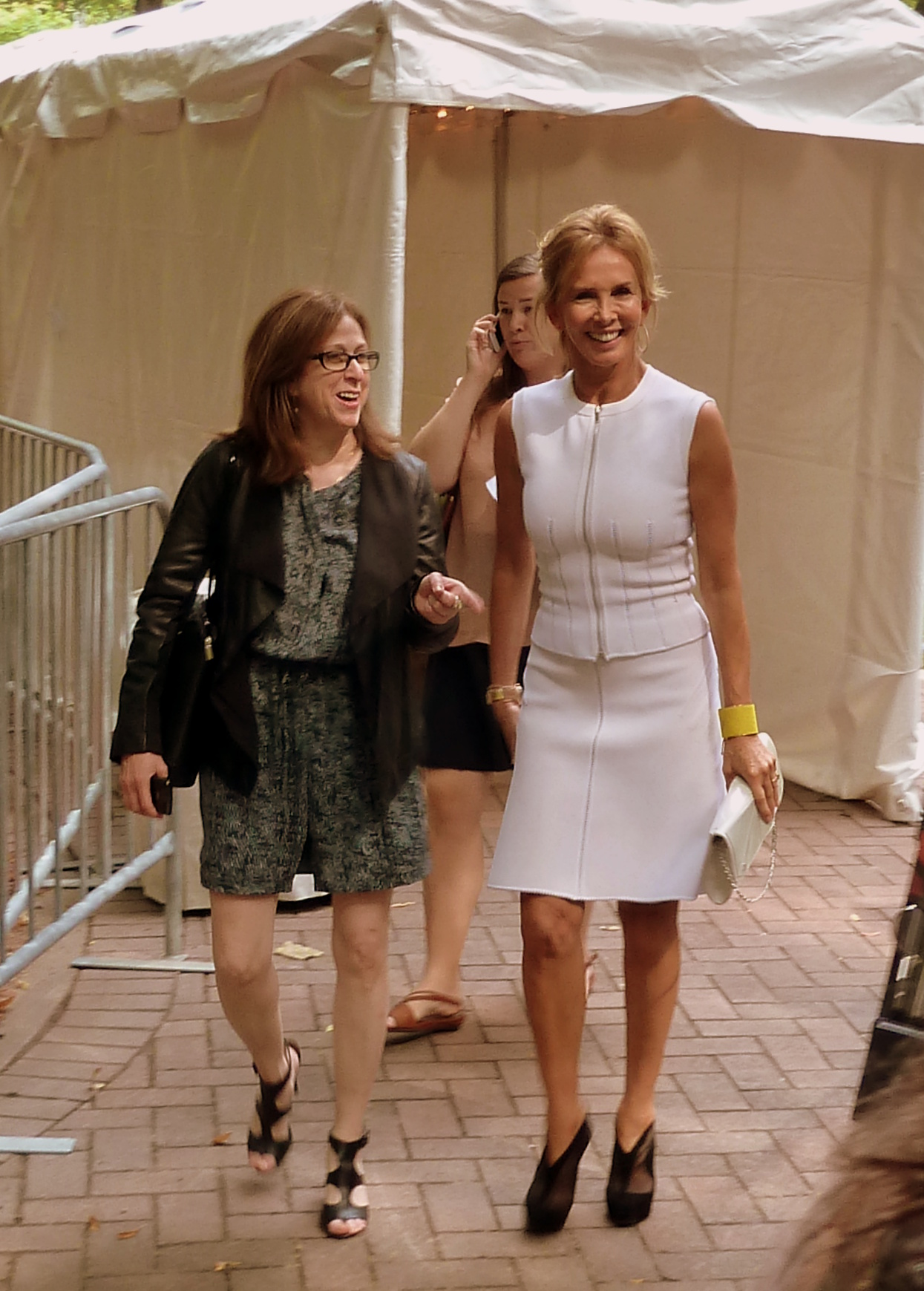
Styler at the premiere of Girl Most Likely, Toronto International Film Festival 2012

In the mid-1990s, Styler established Xingu Films, a production company dedicated to supporting new talent, such as Guy Ritchie, Dito Montiel and Duncan Jones. In late July 2008 it was announced that Xingu had optioned American Reaper, an upcoming graphic novel written by Pat Mills, who would also write the screenplay.

Styler has produced and co-directed several award-winning documentaries and feature films, including Guy Ritchie's Lock, Stock and Two Smoking Barrels and Snatch; Duncan Jones' Moon; and Michael Apted's Moving the Mountain, which won the 1994 International Independent Documentary Award.

After moving to New York, Styler co-founded the production company Maven Pictures with Celine Rattray in 2011. Their first feature, Girl Most Likely, starred Kristen Wiig; closely followed by Filth, starring James McAvoy; Black Nativity starring Forest Whitaker; Ten Thousand Saints starring Ethan Hawke; and American Honey starring Shia LaBeouf, which won Jury Prize (Cannes Film Festival) at the Cannes Film Festival in 2016. Styler's 2017 directorial debut, Freak Show, is based on the New York Times bestseller by James St. James, and stars AnnaSophia Robb, Alex Lawther, and Bette Midler. Freak Show debuted at the 2017 Berlin International Film Festival.

== Philanthropy ==
In 1989, Styler and her husband, Sting, cofounded the Rainforest Foundation Fund, an organisation devoted to protecting rainforests and their indigenous peoples. Since 1991, she has produced regular Rock for the Rainforest benefits at Carnegie Hall. As a UNICEF Ambassador, Styler has also raised millions for their projects around the globe.

In 2008, it was reported that Styler donated £10,000 into the charitable Ama Sumani cancer fund. Sumani was terminally ill with cancer and unable to afford treatment in her native Ghana, but had been deported from a Cardiff hospital after the expiry of her visa. Sumani died on 19 March 2008.

Styler is also a patron of the Elton John AIDS Foundation.

== Personal life ==
Styler married rock musician Sting at Camden Register Office on 20 August 1992, and the couple had their wedding blessed two days later in the twelfth-century parish church of St Andrew in Great Durnford, Wiltshire, south-west England. Sting had separated from his first wife, actress Frances Tomelty, in 1982 after beginning an affair with Styler. Styler became pregnant by Sting in 1983. Tomelty and Sting divorced in 1984. As The Independent reported in 2006, Tomelty "just happened to be Trudie's best friend when Sting and Frances lived next door to Trudie in Bayswater, west London.

Sting and Styler have four children, including Mickey and Eliot Paulina. She is also step-mother of two children, daughter Fuschia and son Joe, whom Sting shares with Tomelty.

== Filmography ==
=== Producer ===
- Boys from Brazil (1993)
- Moving the Mountain (1994)
- The Grotesque (1995) a.k.a. Gentlemen Don't Eat Poets (USA) a.k.a. Grave Indiscretion
- Lock, Stock and Two Smoking Barrels (1998) a.k.a. Two Smoking Barrels (USA)
- Snatch (2000)
- Greenfingers (2000) a.k.a. Jailbuds
- The Sweatbox (2002; also director)
- Cheeky (2003)
- A Guide to Recognizing Your Saints (2006)
- Alpha Male (2006)
- Moon (2009)
- Wake Up (2010)
- The Son of No One (2011)
- Girl Most Likely (2012)
- Filth (2013)
- Black Nativity (2013)
- Still Alice (2014)
- Ten Thousand Saints (2015)
- Miss You Already (2015)
- American Honey (2016)
- For Grace (2016)
- Anatomy of Violence (2016)
- Novitiate (2017)
- Freak Show (2017; also director)
- Kings (2017)
- The Kindergarten Teacher (2018)
- Wildling (2018)
- Boarding School (2018)
- Skin (2018, short)
- Skin (2018)
- Driveways (2019)
- Human Capital (2019)
- With/In: Volume 1 (2021)
- With/In: Volume 2 (2021)
- Silent Night (2021)
- A Mouthful of Air (2021)
- Infinite Storm (2022)
- Inland (2022)
- Unicorns (2023)
- The Burial (2023)
- Eleanor the Great (2025)
- Christmas Karma (2025)
- Happy Hours (2026)

=== Actor (selected) ===
- Poldark (1977, 5 episodes)
- The Mayor of Casterbridge (1978, episode: #1.7)
- The Gentle Touch (1980, episode: "Shock")
- Funny Man (1981, 11 episodes)
- The Bell (1982, 4 episodes)
- Cockles (1984, episode: "Mermaids")
- Miss Marple: The Body in the Library (1984)
- The American Bride (1986)
- Fair Game (1988)
- The Grotesque (1995)
- The Scold's Bridle (1998, 2 episodes)
- Midsomer Murders (1999, episode: "Strangler's Wood")
- Me Without You (2001)
- Friends (2001, episode: "The One with Monica's Boots")
- Bug (2002)
- Empire (2005, 3 episodes)
- Love Soup (2005, 5 episodes)
- Alpha Male (2006)
- The Vicar of Dibley (2007, Comic Relief special: "Wife Swap")
- Living Proof (2008)
- Paris Connections (2010)
- The Next Three Days (2010)
- A Dish of Tea with Dr. Johnson (West End, Edinburgh, 2011 tour)
- Filth (2013)
- Zoolander 2 (2016)
- Maniac (2018, 4 episodes)
- Pose (2019, 4 episodes)
- With/In: Volume 2 (2021)
- Silent Night (2021)
- Search Party (2022, 2 episodes)
- Hello & Paris (TBA)

=== Director ===
- "My Funny Friend and Me" (2000, music video; co-directed with John-Paul Davidson)
- The Sweatbox (2002; co-directed with John-Paul Davidson)
- Wait (2005, short)
- Freak Show (2016)
- Spark Hunter (2022, podcast series)
- Posso entrare? An ode to Naples (2023; also writer)
- Up Against It (2026)
