= Moving the Mountain (1994 film) =

- Directed by: Michael Apted
- Produced by: Trudie Styler
- Cinematography: Maryse Alberti
- Edited by: Susanne Rostock
- Music by: Liu Sola
- Production company: Xingu Films
- Distributed by: October Films (USA)
- Release date: 29 April 1994
- Running time: 83 minutes
- Countries: United Kingdom; Canada
- Language: English

Moving the Mountain is a 1994 feature documentary directed by Michael Apted and produced by Trudie Styler, with cinematography by Maryse Alberti and music by Liu Sola.

The film takes its title from the memoir by Li Lu, one of the student leaders of the Tiananmen Square protests of 1989. Though Li Lu is a central figure in the finished film, the project set out to provide a comprehensive understanding of the events leading up to and following the Tiananmen Square protests. The film features interviews with five of the student leaders (Wang Dan, Chai Ling, Wu'er Kaixi, Wang Chaohua and Li Lu), several supporters of the movement and Wei Jingsheng, a prominent dissident who led the Democracy Wall movement of 1978. Interviews with Wang Dan, number 1 on the government's most-wanted list, and Wei Jingsheng were conducted in secret in Beijing, with the remaining interviews conducted in New York, Washington, D.C., San Francisco and Los Angeles. the film includes extensive archival footage from the Cultural Revolution, the Tiananmen Incident of 1976, the Death of Mao Zedong in 1976, the Democracy Wall movement of 1978, and the protests of 1989. This footage was supplemented by dramatic recreations of key childhood events in the life of Li Lu filmed in Taiwan and of the escape routes of several student leaders filmed in Hong Kong.

== Year-end lists ==
- Honorable mention – Betsy Pickle, Knoxville News-Sentinel
