= Up Against It (2026 film) =

- Directed by: Trudie Styler
- Written by: Camille Griffin; Chloe King
- Produced by: Celine Rattray; Trudie Styler; Piers Tempest
- Starring: Antonio Banderas; Eva Birthistle; Forest Whitaker; Richard E. Grant; Úrsula Corberó; Arinzé Kene; Mickey Sumner
- Cinematography: Dante Spinotti
- Music by: George Fenton
- Production companies: Maven Screen Media; Tempo Productions
- Release date: September 12, 2026 (TIFF)
- Running time: 122 minutes
- Country: United Kingdom
- Languages: English; Spanish

Up Against It is a British romantic comedy film directed by Trudie Styler and written by Camille Griffin and Chloe King. It stars Antonio Banderas, Eva Birthistle, Forest Whitaker, Richard E. Grant, Úrsula Corberó, Arinzé Kene, and Mickey Sumner. The film premiered at the 2026 Toronto International Film Festival on 12 September 2026.

== Cast ==
- Antonio Banderas as Álvaro
- Eva Birthistle as Saffron
- Forest Whitaker
- Richard E. Grant
- Úrsula Corberó
- Arinzé Kene
- Mickey Sumner
- Selena Tan
- Eden Hamilton as Rose
- Jordan Nash as Michael

== Production ==
In May 2025, it was revealed that Trudie Styler would be directing a romantic comedy film then titled Rose's Baby with Antonio Banderas in the lead role.

George Fenton was hired to compose the score.

Principal photography began on August 4, 2025, in London, with Forest Whitaker, Richard E. Grant, Eva Birthistle, Úrsula Corberó, Arinzé Kene, Mickey Sumner, and Eden Hamilton rounding out the cast. Filming wrapped in late September.

== Release ==
The film premiered at the 2026 Toronto International Film Festival on 12 September 2026.
