= With/In =

- Produced by: Trudie Styler; Celine Rattray; Peter Sobiloff; Michael Soblioff
- Cinematography: Zach Kuperstein
- Edited by: Tariq Anwar
- Music by: Mark Adler
- Production company: Maven Screen Media
- Release dates: June 13, 2021 (Volume 1 Tribeca); June 14, 2021 (Volume 2 Tribeca)
- Running time: Volume 1: 73 minutes Volume 2: 122 minutes
- Country: United States
- Language: English

With/In is a 2021 American anthological drama film that revolves around themes of confinement and isolation.

The film was released in two volumes at the Tribeca Film Festival on June 13 and 14, 2021.

== Filmmakers and cast ==
=== Volume 1 ===
- Mother!!: directed by Morgan Spector and Maya Singer, written by Maya Singer, starring Rebecca Hall, Morgan Spector and Maya Singer.
- Coco and Gigi:, written and directed by Rosie Perez, starring Rosie Perez and Justina Machado.
- Leap: directed by Sanaa Lathan, written by Margaret Nagle, starring Sanaa Lathan and Lucy Punch.
- Intersection: written and directed by Bart Freundlich, starring Julianne Moore, Don Cheadle, Talia Balsam and Taj Swaminathan-Sipp.

=== Volume 2 ===
- Nuts: directed by Chris Cooper, written by Marianne Leone, starring Marianne Leone and Chris Cooper.
- Neighborhood Watch: written and directed by Sam Nivola, starring Emily Mortimer, Alessandro Nivola, May Nivola and Sam Nivola.
- One Night Stand: written and directed by Griffin Dunne, starring Griffin Dunne and Zonia Pelensky.
- Touching: directed by Jonathan Cake and Julianne Nicholson, written by Jonathan Cake, starring Julianne Nicholson, Jonathan Cake, Iggy Cake and Phoebe Cake.
- In the Air: written and directed by Bill Camp and Elizabeth Marvel, starring Bill Camp, Elizabeth Marvel and Silas Camp.
- Her Own: written and directed by Arliss Howard, starring Debra Winger and Arliss Howard.
- Twenty Questions: written and directed by Sebastian Gutierrez, starring Carla Gugino and Adrianne Palicki.
- Shell Game: written, directed by, and starring Gina Gershon.
- I'm Listening: directed by Mickey Sumner, written by Portia Alen-Buckley and Mike Lindley, starring Mickey Sumner and Trudie Styler.

== Production ==
At the end of July 2020 it was announced that Julianne Moore, Don Cheadle, Sanaa Lathan, Rebecca Hall, Chris Cooper, Alessandro Nivola, Emily Mortimer, Rosie Perez, and Debra Winger are part of the star cast of the film With/In, a film anthology that revolves around themes of confinement and isolation. During post-production the film was split into two parts.

== Release ==
The film had its world premiere at the Tribeca Film Festival on June 13 and 14, 2021.

Leap was nominated for its script by Margaret Nagle for the 2022 Humanitas Award for Best Short Film.
