= Unicorns (2023 British film) =

British drama film

- Theatrical release poster
- Directed by: James Krishna Floyd; Sally El Hosaini
- Written by: James Krishna Floyd
- Produced by: Philip Herd; Trudie Styler; Celine Rattray; Bill Pohlad; Kim Roth; Christa Workman
- Starring: Ben Hardy; Jason Patel; Sagar Radia; Ali Afzal; Nisha Nayar; Val The Brown Queen
- Cinematography: David Raedeker
- Edited by: Iain Kitching
- Music by: Stuart Earl
- Production companies: Maven Screen Media; River Road Entertainment; Chromatic Aberration
- Distributed by: Signature Entertainment (United Kingdom); Netflix (United Kingdom); Cohen Media Group (United States)
- Release dates: September 8, 2023 (TIFF); July 5, 2024 (United Kingdom)
- Running time: 119 minutes
- Countries: United Kingdom; United States; Sweden
- Language: English

Unicorns is a romantic drama film directed by James Krishna Floyd (who also wrote the screenplay) and Sally El Hosaini, released on 5 July 2024. The film stars Ben Hardy as Luke, a single father and mechanic who is forced to question his sexual identity when he unexpectedly falls in love with Aysha (Jason Patel), a drag queen.

A coproduction of companies from the United Kingdom, the United States and Sweden, the film was written by Floyd, and marks his directorial debut.

The film premiered in the Special Presentations program at the 2023 Toronto International Film Festival. It was nominated for seven British Independent Film Awards at the 2024 BIFAs, winning one. At the 2024 Dinard Film Festival it won both the Special Jury Prize and the Audience Award.

Attitude magazine called it a 'trailblazing film' and in November 2024, it was bought by Netflix for the UK. For the US it was bought by Cohen Media Group for all North American rights, releasing in cinemas in 2025.

== Plot ==
Luke Tilson has sex with a random hookup in a grassy knoll in Essex. She refuses a lift home because she wants to keep it casual. Ashiq Darber prepares his makeup for his drag queen alter ego, Aysha. He is given a ride by Faiz.

Luke finishes a meal at a restaurant, then heads to a basement bathroom. He hears music coming from an adjacent door, and enters to find an underground club where Aysha is dancing. He is mesmerized. Afterwards, Aysha approaches Luke and they flirt, then head into the back alley and make out with each other. A fan requests a selfie with Aysha, wherein Luke notice's Aysha's Adam's apple and realizes Aysha is a man.

Luke flees to his car and Aysha chases after him. But Luke leaves, and a bitterly jealous Faiz refuses to drive Aysha anymore for flirting with Luke in front of him. Luke returns home, where his son Jamie has a temper tantrum. Luke promises to take him to Disneyland if he goes to sleep.

The following day, Ashiq's brother Hammad arrives at the beauty store where Ashiq works and warns him to be careful about his drag lifestyle, fearing for his safety. They hug and Hammad departs. Meanwhile, Luke arrives at Jamie's school, where Jamie kicked his classmate for stealing his pencil. The teacher warns Luke about Jamie's bullying behavior.

Ashiq (out of drag) and his best friend, fellow drag queen Zina (in drag), go shopping, where Ashiq tells her the story about Luke. At a bar, Luke hangs out with a couple, Danny and Poppy. Danny puts his lips against Luke's to blow cigarette smoke into it, which unnerves Luke.

The next day, Aysha arrives in drag at Luke's mechanic shop, having googled his name. She requests that he be her new driver ("I don't drive—I'm meant to be driven.") and promises him £200. He agrees after his father Gary encourages him to pursue this, noting his ex Emma (Jamie's mother) has "moved on".

At first, Luke is silent, but Aysha makes Luke laugh by declaring her pronouns to be "icon" and "legend". Luke gradually begins warming up to her. They then pick up Zina, and two other friends: another drag queen and a cisgender female. They encounter Karen, Aysha's rival and Faiz's "wife", at a pit stop on their way to the same Mudra party in Birmingham, thrown by Asian billionaires.

At the event, Luke waits in the car because he "doesn't pass as 'gaysian'". Aysha brings him a drink, and reveals she gets anonymous death threats. Later on, Aysha and Karen begin fighting, first inside then outside. Luke attempts to break it up, but Faiz gets jealous of Luke touching Aysha. Karen rips off Aysha's wig, but Aysha then knees Karen in the nose, breaking it. Luke rescues Aysha and they drive back home.

Along the way, they get to know each other a bit more. Aysha inquires "Would we have had sex the night we met…if I was a woman?", to which Luke replied "Yeah…but you're not." They then strike a deal in which Luke will continue driving Aysha for a 60/40 split.

One night, Luke brings along Jamie to meet Aysha and they go to an amusement park together, where she bonds with Jamie. The next day, Ashiq goes to visit his mother in Manchester, who is oblivious to his drag persona. His father and brother return to the house, but Ashiq makes an excuse to leave.

While playing football with Jamie, his mother Emma reappears unexpectedly, much to Luke's irritation. Aysha and Luke then do karaoke together, where Luke's feelings begin to develop. He then returns home, where Emma is putting Jamie to bed. She pleads with Luke to give her a chance to be a better mother. The two drink wine and kiss, but Luke pulls away. Emma goes to help Jamie to sleep.

After one event, Aysha asks Luke in for a drink. Aysha initiates a truth or dare game, but Luke leans in and starts kissing Aysha. She then is about to give him oral sex, when he hesitates. He then relents, but she is upset and asks him to leave. Luke discovers the mini wrench from his shop that she kept, and realizes how deeply she feels. He admits that he desires her but is sexually confused, saying "I've never done this before". They reignite their intimacy and have sex for the first time.

The next morning, Aysha is awoken by her buzzer. Not realizing somebody broke through her gate, she answers it to find it's Karen—who then slings a bottle full of acid at Aysha's face. As Aysha hollers in agony, Luke phones an ambulance. At the ER, Ashiq learns he'll be scarred for life and, embarrassed, tells Luke to leave. He reluctantly does so, upset.

Luke continues to try to contact Aysha/Ashiq, but he refuses to answer his calls. In the meantime, Ashiq returns home to his family to convalesce. He comes out to his mom, who warns him never to repeat that to his father, although she assures him that she loves him. Ashiq tells his father he feels "on the right path" as they pray together.

Luke, desperate to find Ashiq, shows up at Zina's job, where Zina is out of drag. Luke pleads for Ashiq's address, but Zina warns him that "Aysha doesn't exist anymore". Luke then arrives at Ashiq's house, where his family interrogate him. Once they learn he too has a son, his father tells Hammad to bring his brother down. However, their mother allows Luke to go up and see him, knowing Ashiq's truth.

Luke tells Ashiq he misses him, gives him a present, and cajoles him into leaving the house so they can drink airplane shooters. Ashiq tells Luke that Aysha is likely retired, and encourages him to find someone else. Luke drives him back home, holding his hand. Ashiq heads inside and Luke cries before driving away.

Ashiq goes to the bathroom and tries on the lipstick present Luke bought. Back at his shop, Luke is ratcheting something in a car, when he hears Aysha's heels clacking. He asks her what to do about her family, and she says she's saving up for therapy. They kiss passionately.

== Cast ==
- Ben Hardy as Luke Tilson
- Jason Patel as Aysha / Ashiq Darber
- Hannah Onslow
- Nisha Nayar
- Michael Karim
- Sagar Radia
- Ravin J Ganatra
- Ali Afzal
- Val The Brown Queen
- Jaimie Tank
- Anthony Pius
- Saba Shiraz
- Miss Jalebi Bebe
- Adeel Ahmed
- Grant Davis
- Madelyn Smedley
- Kate Lindsey
- Dan Linney
- Karen Sampford
- Angela Phinnimore
- Karen Bartholomew
- Jenny O'Leary
- Taylor Sullivan
- Aqeel Torres

== Reception ==
=== Critical response ===
On the review aggregator website Rotten Tomatoes, 78% of 49 critics' reviews are positive, with an average rating of 7.10/10.

Joey Moser of Awards Daily gave the film a positive review, writing: "[This film] is unlike anything you’ve ever seen, because we have never thought of honoring a drag love story in such a balanced way," and called it: "Such an important piece of new queer cinema." David Opie of IndieWire graded it a B, commenting: "More romantic than Layla (2024) and gentler than Femme (2023), [it] lies somewhere between the two in terms of its intensity, yet there's still hope to be found and even some glitz amidst the gritty social realism of it all."

Zachary Lee of RogerEbert.com praised Ben Hardy's performance: "Hardy delivers career-best work here, all fixed muscle on the outside, but upon closer look, that frame acts as a cage for his more tender self that desperately wants out." Rich Cline of Shadows on the Wall awarded it 4/5 stars, and commended Jason Patel's debut: "Newcomer Patel is also terrific in a difficult role, balancing the colourful stage turns with lively attitude as well as more hushed restraint visits to his childhood home."

Peter Debruge of Variety compared it favorably to My Beautiful Laundrette (1985), and stated: "Co-directors Sally El Hosaini's and James Krishna Floyd's scrappy drama shows enormous heart, but it's the lead actors [Hardy and Patel] and their disparate identities that distinguish an otherwise familiar LGBT-themed indie." Randy Myers of The Mercury News lauded the positivity: "There's hope and joy to be found here along with passion and genuine heat, giving us a gay romance to treasure for years to come. Hardy's performance, in particular, is unforgettable."

Padaí Ó Maolchalann of InReview lambasted the film's tropes: "With the warm and fuzzy guise of the most milquetoast rom-com but the thematic concerns of a modern-day kitchen-sink drama, [it] is a trite, cloyingly sentimental, drearily predictable movie, its familiar premise developed through cliché after cliché until you can't just anticipate the next scene, but the next several."
