= Infinite Storm =

2022 American film

- Theatrical release poster
- Directed by: Małgorzata Szumowska; Michał Englert
- Screenplay by: Josh Rollins
- Based on: High Places: Footprints in the Snow Lead to an Emotional Rescue by Ty Gagne
- Produced by: Celine Rattray; Trudie Styler; Jenny Halper; Naomi Watts; Miri Yoon
- Starring: Naomi Watts; Billy Howle; Denis O'Hare; Parker Sawyers; Eliot Sumner
- Cinematography: Michał Englert
- Edited by: Agata Ciernark; Jarosław Kamiński
- Music by: Lorne Balfe
- Production companies: Maven Screen Media; Polish Film Institute
- Distributed by: Bleecker Street (United States); Stage 6 Films (International)
- Release date: March 25, 2022
- Running time: 97 minutes
- Country: United States
- Language: English
- Box office: $1.6 million

Infinite Storm is a 2022 American drama adventure film directed by Małgorzata Szumowska, co-directed by Michał Englert, and with a screenplay by Josh Rollins, based on the article "High Places: Footprints in the Snow Lead to an Emotional Rescue" by Ty Gagne. The film stars Naomi Watts, Billy Howle, Denis O'Hare, Parker Sawyers and Eliot Sumner.

Infinite Storm was released in the United States on March 25, 2022, by Bleecker Street. The film received mixed reviews from critics.

== Plot ==
Pam Bales is a search and rescue volunteer who sets off one fateful morning on a hike taking her to the top of Mount Washington. Suddenly a fierce storm sets in but she sees tracks in the snow of someone wearing only sneakers. She comes across a strange-acting, incoherent man she calls "John" and the two begin a dangerous trek down the mountain to safety, facing many obstacles along the way and almost drowning at one point. During this time, Pam has various "flashbacks" regarding her two young daughters who died in a gas leak accident. After almost freezing to death, the two manage to make it to safety only to have "John" drive off suddenly without so much as a thank you. Pam tries to find out his real name and at the end, the two have an emotional meeting at a coffee shop where she mentions that her two little girls died from a gas leak and he mentions a loved one that had frozen to death on the mountain the previous year.

== Cast ==
- Naomi Watts as Pam Bales
- Billy Howle as John
- Denis O'Hare as Dave
- Parker Sawyers as Patrick
- Eliot Sumner as Hiker Bill
- Josh Rollins as Finn

== Production ==
In February 2021, it was announced Naomi Watts, Sophie Okonedo, Billy Howle, Denis O'Hare and Parker Sawyers had joined the cast of the film, with Małgorzata Szumowska and Michał Englert set to direct the film, from a screenplay by Josh Rollins. Watts will also serve as a producer on the film, with Bleecker Street set to distribute in the United States, and Sony Pictures Worldwide Acquisitions distributing internationally.

Principal photography began on February 1, 2021 and concluded on May 1, 2021. Kamnik, Slovenia, was the main filming location. Filming took place on Velika Planina, a nature trail above Kamnik. The cast and crew also filmed some footage in Kamniška Bistrica Valley, which lies close to the source of the Kamnik Bistrica river. Some scenes were shot at International Picnic Center (aka Pri Jurju) in the same region.

== Release ==
The film was released on March 25, 2022.

=== Box office ===
In the United States and Canada, Infinite Storm was released alongside The Lost City and RRR, and was projected to gross less than $1.5 million from 1,525 theaters in its opening weekend. The film earned $758,919 in its opening weekend, and $294,538 in its second. It added $16,237 (a drop of 95%) in its third weekend and $2,916 (a drop of 82%) in its fourth.

=== Critical response ===
The review aggregator Rotten Tomatoes reported an approval rating of 55%, with an average rating of 5.9/10, based on 60 reviews. The site's critics' consensus reads: "Infinite Storm's dramatization of a real-life story feels frustratingly incomplete, but that's often outweighed by Naomi Watts' outstanding performance." At Metacritic the film has a weighted average score of 56 out of 100, based on 18 critics, indicating "mixed or average" reviews. According to PostTrak, 55% of audience members gave the film a super tank mixed reviews.
