= Ama Sumani =

- Born: 8 April 1965; Accra, Ghana.
- Died: 19 March 2008 (aged 42); Accra, Ghana
- Children: Maria (daughter, born circa 1989), Mariama (daughter, born circa 1991), Mary (daughter, born circa 1992), Grace (daughter, born circa 1994), Sameede (son, born circa 2001), Samede (son, born circa 2001), Sameb (son, born circa 2001)

Ama Sumani (28 August 1965 – 19 March 2008) was a Ghanaian woman who was expelled from the United Kingdom to Ghana after overstaying her visa while she was suffering from a terminal form of bone marrow cancer and receiving dialysis treatment. It was reported that her expulsion caused her to go without a drug that could have prolonged her life, a drug not available in her native Ghana.

== Background ==
Ama Sumani, a mother of two, first came to Wales in 2003 with a visitor's visa. According to her solicitor, with the hopes of getting a degree in economics, she quickly applied for a change in visa status to a student visa and attempted to stay in the U.K. by enrolling in a banking course at a local college in the Cardiff area. Her lack of English language skills and poor educational level prevented her from enrolling. She returned to Ghana in 2005 to attend memorial services for her dead husband, but upon returning the UK, her student visa had been revoked. She was permitted to return to Wales under temporary admission assuming she adhered to certain conditions. She eventually violated those requirements by failing to maintain contact with immigration officials and elusive behavior in moving without updating her contact information.

== Her illness ==
By January 2006, she was diagnosed with multiple myeloma, a cancer affecting the bone marrow. By January 2008, the aggressive cancer replicated and led to other serious health problems, namely kidney failure. After she refused a medically recommended transplant operation, doctors began kidney dialysis treatment, in order to prolong her life. Despite the pleas of solicitors working on behalf of Sumani, the Home Office of the United Kingdom ruled that due to Sumani "knowingly overstaying her visa", she was to be "removed the country". Sumani and her representatives pleaded for compassion, noting she could not afford dialysis treatment in Ghana, which would have cost £2,400 upfront to continue her treatment for three months.

On 9 January 2008, Sumani was removed from University Hospital of Wales in Cardiff and transported to Accra, in her native homeland Ghana. Sumani's situation had drawn international media coverage and would soon become a major cause célèbre in both the UK, the Netherlands and Ghana due to her near terminal deteriorating health condition. Officials noted her forced migration was not a 'deportation' because an expired visa merits void legal status in the UK.

== Controversy ==
In an editorial, the Lancet, a British medical journal, decried the decision and wrote, "The UK has committed an atrocious barbarism ... [I]t is time for doctors' leaders to say so – forcefully and uncompromisingly." Church leaders in Wales, including Archbishop Dr. Barry Morgan and several other bishops were similarly upset, calling Sumani's removal a "breach of her basic human rights". Mrs. Sumani's solicitor said she accepted her removal was fair but said they had made representations on her behalf on compassionate grounds.

In the wake of public criticism, Home Office representative Lin Homer defended its actions, stating that Sumani's case, while difficult, was not exceptional. She noted, "We deal with many hundreds of cases where the personal circumstances reach and touch the people involved. It is one of the things that makes being a caseworker in the agency a difficult job".

Sumani's health deteriorated after the removal, as she had not received dialysis treatment for several days after her arrival in Ghana. An anonymous donation of £3,000 was sent by a Dutch resident in Cardiff, and by 20 January 2008, Sumani had begun receiving dialysis treatment. A charitable fund for Sumani's medical expenses was established, and as of February 2008 £30,000 had been donated to the fund. Trudie Styler was reported to have donated £10,000 into the fund.

== Death ==
Despite the kidney dialysis treatments, she was not able to access a supply of thalidomide, a drug that might have prolonged her life. Donors had reportedly raised £70,000 toward her treatments and were able to find doctors in Britain and South Africa to treat her. News of the upcoming treatments reached Sumani on the morning of 18 March 2008. Sumani died in Korle Bu Teaching Hospital in Accra the next day, on 19 March 2008.

== See also ==
- The National Health Service
