= A Mouthful of Air (film) =

- Theatrical release poster
- Directed by: Amy Koppelman
- Written by: Amy Koppelman
- Based on: A Mouthful of Air by Amy Koppelman
- Produced by: Amy Koppelman; Mike Harrop; Amanda Seyfried; Trudie Styler; Celine Rattray
- Starring: Amanda Seyfried; Finn Wittrock; Jennifer Carpenter; Michael Gaston; Amy Irving; Paul Giamatti
- Cinematography: Frank DeMarco
- Edited by: Keith Fraase
- Music by: John Gürtler
- Production companies: Maven Screen Media; Ice Cream & Whiskey; Off Media; Carte Blanche; Studio Mao; Farcaster Films
- Distributed by: Stage 6 Films
- Release date: October 29, 2021
- Running time: 105 minutes
- Country: United States
- Language: English
- Budget: $2.3 million
- Box office: $269,435

A Mouthful of Air is a 2021 American psychological drama film written, directed and produced by Amy Koppelman, based on her 2003 novel of the same name. It stars Amanda Seyfried, Finn Wittrock, Jennifer Carpenter, Michael Gaston, Amy Irving, and Paul Giamatti.

It was released on October 29, 2021 by Stage 6 Films.

== Plot ==
On the eve of her baby son's first birthday, Julie Davis survives a suicide attempt. In the following weeks of her recovery, she tries to show gratitude for the positive things in life, but continues to suffer ongoing anxiety. Julie's discovery that she's pregnant for a second time forces her to face the traumas of her upbringing.

== Cast ==
- Amanda Seyfried as Julie Davis
  - Cate Elefante as young Julie Davis
- Finn Wittrock as Ethan Davis
- Amy Irving as Bobbi Davis
- Jennifer Carpenter as Lucy
- Paul Giamatti as Dr. Sylvester
- Britt Robertson as Rachel Davis
- Eliot Sumner as Doughnuts
- Alysia Reiner as Pam
- Michael Gaston as Ron
- Josh Hamilton as Dr. Salzman

== Production ==
In September 2019, it was announced Amanda Seyfried, Finn Wittrock, Amy Irving, Jennifer Carpenter, and Paul Giamatti had joined the cast of the film, with Amy Koppelman directing from a screenplay she wrote. Principal photography began in September 2019.

== Release ==
In April 2021, Sony Pictures Worldwide Acquisitions acquired worldwide distribution rights to the film. It was released on October 29, 2021.

== Reception ==
=== Critical reception ===
On review aggregator Rotten Tomatoes, 68% of 31 critics have given the film a positive review, with an average rating of 6.2/10. The website's critics consensus reads, "A Mouthful of Air isn't as emotionally impactful as it might have been, but Amanda Seyfried's devastating performance lends the story weight." On Metacritic, the film has a weighted average score of 52 out of 100 based on 11 critics, indicating "mixed or average" reviews.

David Ehrlich of IndieWire critiqued the film's use of melodrama, but praised Seyfried's performance, writing she "sidesteps histrionics in favor of something more honest and upsetting" and "leads every scene with such an excitable degree of fear and fragility". Peter Bradshaw of The Guardian was more critical, writing the film "needed less sensitive good taste and more explicit storytelling passion." Natalia Winkelman of The New York Times wrote "the movie’s portrait of depression often feels as facile as its opening image: Julie’s wide blue eyes with a single tear trailing down her cheek."

=== Box office ===
In North America, the film earned $130,701 from 816 theaters, the fifth lowest grossing opening weekend for a film in wide release (excluding re-releases) since box office tracking began.
