= Bryan Rabin =

American film and event producer, nightlife promoter and figure skater

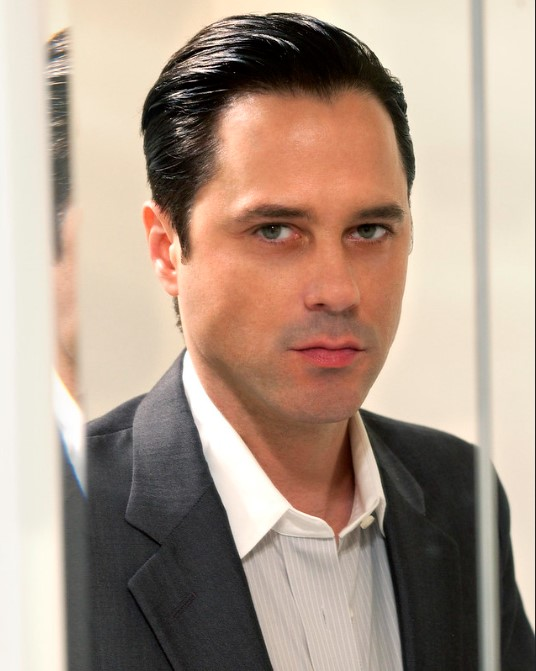
- Occupations: Film producer, club promoter, event producer, figure skater
- Years active: 1990 - present
- Known for: Producer of Freak Show, Promoter of nightclubs such as Prague, Cherry, Giorgio’s in Los Angeles

Bryan Rabin is an American film and event producer, nightlife promoter, and former figure skater based in Los Angeles, CA. He has launched, produced and promoted several Los Angeles nightclubs such as Prague, Highball, Cherry, Diamond Dogs at H.Wood and Giorgio’s at The Standard Hotel. He also produced the 2017 film Freak Show.

== Early life ==
Rabin grew up in Northbrook, Illinois.

== Career ==
=== Figure skating career ===
Rabin was the Novice and Jr Champion at the Upper Great Lakes Regionals and the freeskating champion at the 1985 and 1986 Midwestern Sectionals. He was the 1985 Novice National Bronze Free Skating champion. He had a top ten finish in his first year in the Jr. category at the 1986 U.S. Figure Skating Championships. Rabin was injured in 1987 and went back after a 20 year break to eventually compete in the U.S. Adult National Figure Skating Championships in the Masters Men category in 2007 at 38 years old, winning the bronze medal and the only man to complete a double axel and triple jump in the championships.

=== Acting and modeling ===
Rabin was first exposed to the entertainment industry by booking various commercials and modeling jobs.

=== Early career as club promoter ===
Rabin began his career as a promoter by creating and hosting clubs such as an after-hours party called The Lounge at a costume store on Hollywood Boulevard in 1990. In 1993, Rabin became the producer and promoter of the nightclubs Prague, and Highball.^{[9][10]} Rabin founded the 70’s glam rocks-themed dance club Cherry in 1994, which became one of the longest running weekly clubs in Los Angeles history. Cherry featured a rotating roster of rock’n’roll artists while presenting provocative performances. Cherry got media coverage in many publications such as Los Angeles Magazine, and was the subject of an hour-long documentary for E! titled Hollywood Nights.

=== Event production ===
Rabin produced Warner Brothers Records' worldwide release party for Madonna's Music album in 2000. This event was held at a Koreatown discotheque. Bryan went on to found the event production company Rabin Rodgers Inc. and produced additional events for clients such as Christian Dior, Vogue, Vanity Fair, Armani, Dolce & Gabbana, Paul Smith, Volkswagen, Oscar De La Renta, MOCA, and Gwen Stefani.

=== Back to club promoting ===
In 2009, after almost a decade returned to open his first nightclub. Rabin joined forces with DJ Kelly Cole and Ian Cripps to create the dance party Diamond Dogs at H.Wood in Hollywood, CA.

In 2013, Rabin created Giorgio's: A Modern Discotheque. Giorgio's was a weekly Saturday night dance club which was named after the disco record producer Giorgio Moroder, featured music provided by DJ Adam 12 (Adam Bravin), and took place at mmhmmm at the Standard Hotel in West Hollywood, until it was shut down in 2021 due to the Standard closure.

In April 2016, Rabin launched the first night of Giorgio's Chapter 2 - The New Sound at mmhmmm.

Rabin brought Giorgio’s to Palm Springs for a one-night pop-up event in 2018. Rabin announced plans to relocate Giorgio’s after the Standard’s closure in 2021.

In April 2023, Rabin reopened Giorgio’s in a new location in Hollywood at Grandmaster Recorders.

=== Film production career ===
In 2017, Bryan Rabin produced and developed his first scripted feature film, Freak Show.

=== Charitable work ===
In fall of 2008, Rabin donated his time to the presidential campaign of Barack Obama. He also directed a benefit for the Hollywood Sunset Free Clinic, which provides basic health and mental care to impoverished families. Rabin enlisted artists such as Beck, Rufus Wainwright, and Aimee Mann among others to perform at a concert benefiting the clinic.

In the fall of 2015, Bryan produced the Photo15 auction to benefit the AIDS Monument.

In October 2016, Rabin also produced Photo16, the second annual fundraiser for the AIDS Monument Los Angeles.
