= Wildling (film) =

- Theatrical release poster
- Directed by: Fritz Böhm
- Written by: Fritz Böhm; Florian Eder
- Produced by: Celine Rattray; Trudie Styler; Liv Tyler; Charlotte Ubben
- Starring: Liv Tyler; Bel Powley; Brad Dourif; Collin Kelly-Sordelet; James LeGros
- Cinematography: Toby Oliver
- Edited by: Robb Sullivan; Matt Rundell
- Music by: Paul Haslinger
- Production companies: Maven Pictures; Studio Mao
- Distributed by: IFC Midnight
- Release dates: March 10, 2018 (SXSW); April 13, 2018 (United States)
- Running time: 92 minutes
- Country: United States
- Language: English
- Budget: $2 million
- Box office: $474,122

Wildling is a 2018 American horror fantasy film written and directed by Fritz Böhm in his feature directorial debut, from a screenplay by Böhm and Florian Eder. It stars Liv Tyler, Bel Powley, Brad Dourif, Collin Kelly-Sordelet, Mike Faist, and James LeGros. The film follows a teenage girl who uncovers a dark secret behind her traumatic childhood in the fictional Onatah County.

Wildling premiered at South by Southwest on March 10, 2018, and was released in the United States in select theaters and on video on demand on April 13, 2018. The film received positive reviews, with Powley's performance earning critical praise.

== Plot ==
In Onatah County, Anna spends her childhood confined to the basement by her father, who warns her of a child-eating monster called "The Wildling" roaming the forest. When Anna reaches puberty, "Daddy" gives Anna daily injections of leuprorelin, explaining that he is treating her "illness." The injections, which prevent her body from maturing, cause painful side effects from the injections. When Anna asks Daddy to kill her, Daddy cannot bring himself to shoot her and instead shoots himself.

Anna awakens in hospital where she is treated for the overdose. Sheriff Ellen Cooper tells her that Daddy has survived, but is in critical condition. Anna temporarily stays at Ellen's home until her relatives can be identified and located. She befriends Ellen's younger brother Ray and attends high school with him. When Anna finally enters puberty, she develops superhuman hearing and feels drawn to the forest and the Northern Lights. A DNA test reveals that Daddy is not Anna's biological father.

Ray takes Anna to a party. They share a brief kiss before Ray notices that Anna's mouth is bleeding. After rushing to the bathroom, Anna loses several teeth and flees out the window. Local bully Lawrence finds her in the woods. He strips off her dress and tries to rape her, but she rips out his throat with her teeth. Confused and frightened, Anna realizes that sharper teeth are pushing out her human teeth, and her fingernails are slowly becoming claw-like.

Stumbling around half-naked, she comes across the house of "Daddy" where she showers the blood off and puts on some clean clothes. The next day, she walks back into town and is picked up by Ellen. Later in the forest, Anna encounters a one-eyed outdoorsman. He tells her that he has not seen one of her kind since the townspeople conducted "the purge" sixteen years ago. He also explains that she will find her mother in a nearby cave. There, Anna discovers a fanged skull with a bullet hole in the forehead. She suddenly remembers "Daddy" shooting her mother during the purge. "Daddy" could not bring himself to kill baby Anna and instead raised her as his daughter and kept her hidden from the outside world.

Anna returns to Ellen's home where Ellen handcuffs her and takes her to jail. Ellen explains that the police have discovered Lawrence's body next to Anna's dress. Later that night, "Daddy" visits Anna and tells her that sparing her life was his greatest mistake, as he broke his oath "to kill all the Wildlings." He hands Anna a syringe with a lethal dose of leuprorelin and urges her to take it, but she refuses.

The next morning, Ellen checks on Anna, who manages to lock Ellen in the jail cell and escape. Anna convinces Ray to drive north towards the forest. Abandoning the car, they go into the forest where they have sex as Ray feels hair growing on Anna's lower back. The next morning, Anna discovers claws have grown on her feet. "Daddy" and a group of hunters ambush them, shooting Ray in the arm as they escape. Anna splits off from Ray and leads the hunting party away.

Three months later, Anna has almost fully transformed into a Wildling sporting darker skin, hair on parts of her body, and a near-deformed face. Ellen follows the hunters on one of their expeditions. Anna kills several hunters, but Ellen allows her to escape after seeing that she is pregnant. The hunters set the forest on fire, forcing Anna to dig underground, undergoing further transformations in the process with big hands and stretched out feet as she rips off her clothes. "Daddy" ambushes Anna and tranquilizes her, intending to perform a Caesarean section to take out the unborn child. Anna fights off the drugs, unhinges her jaws, and rips his throat out before collapsing. Anna awakens to find the outdoorsman stitching her wounds.

The next morning, Ellen and Ray see Anna from afar as she runs back towards the mountains in a northern direction. Sometime later in the far north, a fully transformed Anna cradles her newborn child under the Northern Lights, she hears the call of another Wildling.

== Cast ==
- Liv Tyler as Ellen Cooper, the Sheriff of Onatah County
- Bel Powley as Anna, a teenager who is secretly a Wildling.
  - Aviva Winick as Little Anna
  - Arlo Mertz as toddler Anna
- Brad Dourif as "Daddy", a man who took in a younger Anna.
- Collin Kelly-Sordelet as Ray Cooper, the brother of Ellen.
- James LeGros as Wolf Man, a mysterious person in a wolf-furred hat who tells Anna of her Wildling origins.
- Mike Faist as Lawrence Fuller, a bully that picks on Ray.
- Troy Ruptash as Roger Fowler, a deputy who works for Ellen and is friends with "Daddy".
- Trevor E. Dickerson as a Wildling that Anna hallucinated seeing Lawrence as.
- Alina Cho as the voice of the newscaster
- Patrick M. Walsh, Brian Donahue, and Don Hewitt as the Hunters who help "Daddy" hunt Anna

== Production ==
Wildling is the directorial feature debut of Fritz Böhm, who also co-wrote the screenplay with Florian Eder. The film was produced by Maven Pictures (US) in co-production with Arri Media (German), Film i Väst and Filmgate Films (both Swedish) and in association with IM Global and Night Fox Entertainment.

International sales were handled by IM Global, which first introduced the film to buyers at the European Film Market (EFM) during the 2016 Berlin International Film Festival. On February 18, 2016 Screen International announced that UK rights were acquired by Warner Bros. On February 19, 2016 Deadline Hollywood reported the closing of distribution deals for Latin America, South Africa, Switzerland, Portugal, Middle East, Turkey, Thailand, Israel, Ex-Yugoslavia, Indonesia, Malaysia, Baltic States and Vietnam. On February 7, 2018, Variety reported acquisition of the film's release rights in the United States by IFC Films.

=== Casting ===
On October 5, 2015, Deadline Hollywood announced the casting of Bel Powley and Liv Tyler for the lead roles.

In an interview with Film Inquiry, Bel Powley talked about what originally drew her to the film, saying, "I've always wanted projects that kind of subvert tradition and the norm, and I think that's something that Wildling really did from the first draft I read." With Inverse, Powley described the film as a "story about becoming a woman in our society and the obstacles you're faced with." In an interview with Vulture she explained, "What Anna goes through in the movie is symbolic of what every girl goes through when they become a woman."

Brad Dourif said in an interview with Rue Morgue, "When I was first offered the part [of Daddy] I wasn't initially going to do it. But before I actually said no, I wanted to talk to the director [Fritz Böhm] first. I told him about how, as a parent, I was interested in the idea of it, but that I wanted to play the character in a certain way. We worked through it, and after our discussion I wanted to be a part of the film. It was really the theme of fatherhood that compelled me to take it on."

=== Photography ===
Production was first announced on October 5, 2015, and filming took place in late 2015 over 23 shooting days in various locations in the state of New York, including a natural stretch of the Bronx River within the Bronx Zoo, the town of Congers, the Sleepy Hollow police station, Rockland Lake State Park and Inwood Hill Park, Manhattan. In an interview with Deadline Hollywood, Böhm spoke about the challenges of working with child actors, water scenes, animals, and special effects makeup on a limited budget and schedule. During a Q&A in the Arena Cinelounge Hollywood, Böhm revealed that the film's elaborate cave sequences were entirely shot in a warehouse in Brooklyn against blue screen, "since real caves don't exist within the 23-mile radius of Columbus Circle, Manhattan in which the movie had to be shot in order to fulfill the requirements for New York City's film incentive program."

Production designer Lauren Fitzsimmons told audiences at South by Southwest that the attic of "Daddy's house," which is seen in the first 15 minutes of the film, was a set she "built in the same Brooklyn warehouse in which the cave scenes were shot". In a Q&A at the IFC Center (New York City) moderated by Boaz Yakin, Böhm explained that, during the editing process, he drove to the Redwood National Forest in Northern California to shoot additional nature footage by himself as a "one man second unit."

=== Post-production ===
Böhm worked with Arri Media in Munich, Germany where the film was mixed in the Dolby Atmos format. The film was color-timed by Florian "Utsi" Martin, and film editor Peter Boyle served as creative consultant in the editing process. The film comprises roughly 350 visual effect shots, for which Böhm utilized his background as a post-production supervisor and visual effects artist in his native Germany.

== Release ==
Wildling premiered at the South by Southwest Film Festival on March 10, 2018.

IFC Midnight released the film in the United States and Canada on VOD and Digital HD on April 13, 2018, as well as in select theaters starting in New York City and Los Angeles. DVD and Blu-ray release in the United States was on August 7, 2018.

In the UK and Ireland, Warner Bros. released the film theatrically on April 20, 2018. Other theatrical releases included Russia on June 22, 2018 (as САГА О ЧУДОВИЩЕ. СУМЕРКИ) and Turkey on June 22, 2018 (as Yabani)

=== Rating ===
The Motion Picture Association of America gave the film an R rating "for violence including bloody images, language, some sexual content and teen drinking." The British Board of Film Classification rated the film suitable for 15 years or older for "strong bloody images, threat and language".

=== Soundtrack ===
The original motion picture soundtrack was released digitally on April 13, 2018. It features the film's score composed by Paul Haslinger, and the main title song "Wildling" written, performed and produced by Linda Perry.

== Reception ==
On review aggregator website Rotten Tomatoes, the film holds an approval rating of 71% based on 48 reviews, with an average rating of 6.1/10. The site's critics' consensus reads: "Wildling's feminist themes – and the ferocious Bel Powley performance that brings them to life – are often enough to make up for its narrative deficiencies." On Metacritic, the film has a weighted average score of 58 out of 100, based on 10 critics, indicating "mixed or average reviews".

The Hollywood Reporter included Wildling in their "10 Best Films of SXSW 2018". The Hollywood Reporter's Justin Lowe wrote in his review "Whether representing an unsettling allegory of adolescence or a fortuitous convergence of contemporary social issues, IFC Midnight's April release will provide a new perspective on themes of female empowerment before carving out a unique niche in home entertainment formats." Entertainment Weekly gave the film a B+ score with reviewer Leah Greenblatt calling the film "a clever, sharp-fanged mélange of classic midnight-movie horror and modern indie ingenuity." She wrote further, "As Bohm, assisted by vivid visuals from Get Out DP Toby Oliver, steers Wildling toward its gruesome, hallucinatory climax, the film loses something in logic but gains a visceral, almost volcanic momentum." Los Angeles Times's Noel Murray wrote "At its best, Wildling is very smart about how we humans like to compare ourselves to animals" and wrote the film "offers a darker, artier take on one of the classic horror premises: the misunderstood adolescent monster." Sara Stewart of New York Post called the film "skillfully directed" and pointed out Bel Powley's performance, "Powley uses her expressive face perfectly as the guileless Anna."

Ben Kenigsberg of The New York Times called Wildling a "creature feature" that is "functional but lacks flavor." Kenigsberg noted that Powley "is well suited to her character’s wide-eyed wonderment" but found the movie suffers "when she turns into a special effect".

/Film's Meredith Borders called Wildling "such an assured debut, darkly mystical and elegant" and described the film as "a really smart approach to an ageless tale" with "great performances and some extremely effective gore." Jacob Knight of Birth.Movies.Death called the film "beautifully composed" and said that "Bel Powley is incredible as Anna". Vicki Woods of Morbidly Beautiful called the film "a powerful fable". She wrote in her review, "Wildling is a moodily atmospheric thriller combining supernatural scares with a myth-like tale of self-discovery and a beautiful coming-of-age tale" and "the acting throughout is terrific, but it is Bel Powley that takes the movie to another level." Heather Wixon of Daily Dead wrote, "Powley delivers a truly powerful portrayal". Charles Early wrote on Austin360, "Director Fritz Bohm has created a misunderstood creature for the ages". Brian Williams of The Hollywood Outsider wrote, "The masterful direction of Wildling cannot be overstated. With only a two million dollar budget, Böhm pulls off a cinematic miracle that can only be compared to some of the independent upstart movies like Desperado and Clerks in that the budget-to-quality ratio is off the charts."

Alex Arabian of Film Inquiry called Wildling a "wildly original creature feature that transcends the horror genre" and the third act "visually rewarding". He wrote "Wildling is a film about growing up as an outsider, becoming a woman, being free from oppression, and loving your body as it is." He also pointed out the performances by the main cast, writing "Horror legend, iconic character actor, and Oscar nominee Brad Dourif, Liv Tyler, and rising star Bel Powley (The Diary of a Teenage Girl) give a trio of superb performances. As the central and titular character, Powley delivers yet another powerhouse performance, following her The Diary of a Teenage Girl and Carrie Pilby roles." He also noted the work of cinematographer Toby Oliver, writing he did "a phenomenal job lighting and shooting the film". Paul D'Agostino of Hyperallergic called the film "captivating" and wrote "Fritz Böhm's debut film Wildling is cloaked in mystery, dark and dank, occasionally bloody, sometimes shocking, and fantastically folkloric." D'Agostino compared Wildling to Tomas Alfredson's Let The Right One In and a number of films by Guillermo del Toro and M. Night Shyamalan.

Looper called Wildling "one of the best movies of 2018".
