= Tariq Anwar (film editor) =

Indian-born British-American film editor

- Born: 21 September 1945 (age 80); Delhi, British India
- Spouse: Shirley Hills
- Children: 2; including Gabrielle
- Parents: Rafiq Anwar (father); Edith Reich (mother)

Tariq Anwar (born 21 September 1945) is an Indian-born British-American film editor whose credits include Center Stage, The Good Shepherd, Sylvia, Oppenheimer, and American Beauty, for which he was nominated for an Academy Award and won two BAFTA Awards. He has also been nominated for an Academy Award in 2011 for editing The King's Speech. He is now based in the United States and the United Kingdom. With Shirley Hills, he is the father of actress Gabrielle Anwar.

== Early life ==
Anwar was born in Delhi, British India and was raised in Lahore and Bombay. His mother, Edith Reich, was an Austrian Jew, and his father was Indian Muslim film actor and director Rafiq Anwar. He moved with his mother to London after his parents divorced.

== Personal life ==
He is the father of Gabrielle Anwar and Dominic Anwar.

== Filmography ==
Movies

- The Madness of King George (1994)
- The Grotesque (1995)
- The Crucible (1996)
- The Wings of the Dove (1997)
- The Object of My Affection (1998)
- Cousin Bette (1998)
- Tea with Mussolini (1999)
- American Beauty (1999)
- Center Stage (2000)
- Greenfingers (2000)
- Focus (2001)
- Alien Love Triangle (2002)
- Leo (2002)
- Sylvia (2003)
- Stage Beauty (2004)
- American Crude (2005)
- Alpha Male (2006)
- The Good Shepherd (2006)
- Revolutionary Road (2008)
- The Other Man (2008)
- *Hussein Who Said No (2008–2014)
- Law Abiding Citizen (2009)
- The King's Speech (2010)
- Great Expectations (2012)
- Libertador (2013)
- The Lady in the Van (2015)
- Our Kind of Traitor (2016)
- Mark Felt: The Man Who Brought Down the White House (2017)
- Dead in a Week or Your Money Back (2018)
- Farming (2018)
- Human Capital (2019)
- One Night in Miami (2020)
- With/In: Volume 1 (2021)
- With/In: Volume 2 (2021)
- The Supremes at Earl's All-You-Can-Eat (2024)
- William Tell (2024)
- Three Way Week (TBA)

Selected television

- Caught on a Train (1980)
- Oppenheimer (1980)
- Tender Is the Night (1985)
- Fortunes of War (1987)
- Fatherland (1994)

Documentary

- Stephen Fry in America (episodes 1 and 5) (2008)

== Awards and nominations ==
=== Awards ===
- 1980 - BAFTA Television Award for Best Film Editor: Oppenheimer
- 1999 - BAFTA Film Award for Best Editing: American Beauty

=== Nominations ===
- 1999 - Academy Award for Film Editing: American Beauty
- 2011 - Academy Award for Film Editing: The King's Speech
- 2021 - Satellite Award for Best Film Editing: One Night in Miami...

== See also ==
- List of film director and editor collaborations
