= Girl Most Likely =

2012 comedy film

- Theatrical release poster
- Directed by: Shari Springer Berman; Robert Pulcini
- Written by: Michelle Morgan
- Produced by: Mark Amin; Alix Madigan; Celine Rattray; Trudie Styler
- Starring: Kristen Wiig Annette Bening; Matt Dillon; Darren Criss; Christopher Fitzgerald; Natasha Lyonne
- Cinematography: Steve Yedlin
- Edited by: Robert Pulcini
- Music by: Rob Simonsen
- Production companies: Maven Pictures; Anonymous Content Pictures; Ambush Entertainment; 10th Hole Productions; Gambit Films
- Distributed by: Lionsgate; Roadside Attractions
- Release dates: September 7, 2012 (TIFF); July 19, 2013 (United States)
- Running time: 104 minutes
- Country: United States
- Language: English
- Box office: $2.6 million

Girl Most Likely is a 2012 American comedy film directed by Shari Springer Berman and Robert Pulcini and written by Michelle Morgan. The film stars Kristen Wiig as a playwright who stages a suicide in an attempt to win back her ex, only to wind up in the custody of her gambling-addict mother, played by Annette Bening. Matt Dillon, Christopher Fitzgerald, Natasha Lyonne, and Darren Criss co-star.

The film was screened under its original title Imogene at the 2012 Toronto International Film Festival in September 2012. The same month, Lionsgate bought the US distribution rights following its Toronto premiere and released it with Roadside Attractions on July 19, 2013. The film received negative reviews from critics.

== Plot ==
Imogene Duncan was once a promising playwright who now works in a low-paying magazine job in New York City. After her affluent boyfriend leaves her and she is fired from her magazine gig, she stages a suicide attempt in an effort to get her ex's attention but is accidentally discovered by her friend Dara. Held in the hospital on a 5150 (involuntary psychiatric hold), (Note: At the time of the film's release, New York Consolidated Laws c. 9.40, under the statute's mental hygiene codes, were used to invoke involuntary holds of up to 72 hours for "emergency observation, care and treatment in comprehensive psychiatric emergency programs." The statue was repealed on July 1, 2020, pursuant to L.1989, c. 723, § 21. The 5150 term refers to a California statutory code under the Lanterman–Petris–Short Act.) she is eventually released into the care of her estranged mother, who takes Imogene to her childhood home in New Jersey.

Shortly after returning, she hears a conversation between her mother and her new boyfriend, George Bousche, and learns that her father never died, but instead left the family to pursue a PhD. Finding out her father wrote a book, she goes to the local library and steals it. Reading on the back cover that he lives in New York City, she convinces her mother's boarder, Lee, to take her there. However, she is forced to return after she is barred access to her apartment and her friend, Dara, refuses to let her stay in her home.

To pay Lee back for driving her, Imogene goes to see him perform in his Backstreet Boys tribute band. Afterwards they talk about her failed career as a playwright. Years ago, after she won a prestigious grant, Imogene failed to write an actual play and now believes she cannot write. Lee accidentally discovered her old plays while living in her room and believes she is talented and should attempt to write again. They sleep together and the following morning she, Lee and her brother, Ralph, head back to the city for Dara's book launch party.

The launch goes poorly for Imogene, as no one is particularly happy to see her. Her brother Ralph is nearly arrested and is brought to the party by the police. After they leave, Ralph takes them to their father's house where Ralph reveals that he knew he was alive the entire time. Imogene and Ralph have dinner with their wealthy father and his new wife where he expresses no remorse for leaving them.

When their father offers Imogene money to help fix her life, she leaves him and returns home to her mother. After they discuss her father, an assassin arrives looking for Bousche and threatens to kill them all. He is prevented from doing so by Imogene, who dons her brother's human exo-skeleton suit and attacks him.

Ultimately Imogene writes a play based on her experiences called Exo-life starring Julia Stiles, which receives a standing ovation.

== Cast ==
- Kristen Wiig as Imogene Duncan
  - Sydney Lucas as Young Imogene Duncan
  - Julia Stiles as Stage Imogene Duncan
- Annette Bening as Zelda
  - Andrea Martin as Stage Zelda
- Matt Dillon as "George Bousche"
- Darren Criss as Lee
- Christopher Fitzgerald as Ralph
- Natasha Lyonne as Allyson
- June Diane Raphael as Dara
- Michelle Hurd as Libby
- Nate Corddry as Larry
- Mickey Sumner as Hannah
- Brian Petsos as Peter
- Ronald Guttman as Armando
- Nicole Patrick as Monica
- Reed Birney as Dr. Chalmers
- Murray Bartlett as James Whitney
- Bob Balaban as Mr. Duncan

== Reception ==
On review aggregator Rotten Tomatoes, the film holds an approval rating of 24% based on 91 reviews, with an average rating of 4.44/10. The website's critics consensus reads: "Largely witless and disappointingly dull, Girl Most Likely strands the gifted Kristen Wiig in a blandly hollow foray into scattershot sitcom territory." On Metacritic, the film has a weighted average score of 38 out of 100, based on 33 critics, indicating "generally unfavorable" reviews.

Upon its festival release, Girl Most Likely garnered mixed reviews from critics. Christopher Schobert from film blog The Playlist called the film "a big-screen sitcom, elevated by Kristen Wiig and Annette Bening". He wrote that Wiig's "likability oozes from every scene in Shari Springer Berman and Robert Pulcini's occasionally winning, a touch too sitcom-y, but often very funny look at one woman's offbeat family and her attempts at discovering just what went wrong on the road to success. It is not, to be sure, Bridesmaids-style humor, and never reaches that blockbuster's belly laugh count. But the film doesn't lack for moments of inspired comedy, and I expect it to find an audience."

Deborah Young, writing for The Hollywood Reporter, also felt that "the film's great strength is its intuitive casting. The actors interact so well that it's hard to single out one performance, though it's perhaps Bening who wins the day for the sexy humanity she gives to the former go-go dancer Zelda. Morgan's screenplay is full of intelligent dialogue that got real laughs from the audience on its Toronto bow." In his review, Justin Chang from Variety felt that "an able cast, led by Kristen Wiig's prickly lead turn, saves this uneven, excessively quirky but ultimately ingratiating story [...] Offering another sly snapshot of the filmmakers' native New York, a la The Nanny Diaries and The Extra Man this soft-bellied crowdpleaser should post modest numbers in specialty play and DVD/VOD rotation.
