= Three of Hearts: A Postmodern Family =

- Directed by: Susan Kaplan
- Starring: Sam Cagnina; Steven Margolin; Samantha Singh
- Edited by: Toby Shimin
- Music by: Catie Curtis; Ross Levinson
- Distributed by: THINKFilm
- Release date: September 10, 2004 (Toronto International Film Festival)
- Running time: 95 minutes
- Country: United States
- Language: English

Three of Hearts: A Postmodern Family is a 2004 documentary film directed by Susan Kaplan and stars Sam Cagnina, Steven Margolin, and Samantha Singh. The film spans several years of a trinogamous relationship between two men and one woman.
