= Eleanor Henderson =

American author

Eleanor Henderson is an American author. Her books include the novels Ten Thousand Saints (2011) and The Twelve-Mile Straight (2017), as well as the memoir Everything I Have Is Yours (2021). Ten Thousand Saints was named one of the year's best books by The New York Times Book Review and adapted into a film in 2015. Henderson grew up in Florida and studied at Middlebury College and the University of Virginia, where she earned an MFA. She teaches in Ithaca College's Department of Writing.

== Books ==
Ten Thousand Saints follows an interconnected group of young characters between 1987 and 2006, with New York City's straight edge hardcore scene as a backdrop. In portraying this setting, Henderson drew on zines from the era and books like Our Band Could Be Your Life, as well as her husband's memories of growing up in the New York City straight edge scene. The novel was praised by The New York Times: "By delving as deeply into the lives of her characters as she does...Henderson manages to catch something of the bloody, felt intersection of lives and cult bands, of overindulgence and monastic refusal, of the dark, apocalyptic quality of the ’80s." NPR and The Irish Times also published positive reviews. The Guardian was more equivocal, saying that the book was over-plotted and felt "more like a bus tour through the East Village than a dispatch from the streets." The New York Times included the novel in its year-end list of 2011's 10 best books, and it was a finalist for the 2011 Art Seidenbaum Award for First Fiction. In 2015 it was adapted into a film by the same title, written and directed by Shari Springer Berman and Robert Pulcini.

Henderson's 2017 follow-up, The Twelve-Mile Straight, a family drama set in the Jim Crow South, received mixed reviews. The New York Times praised Henderson's observations of "the schizophrenia of Jim Crow" and empathy for her characters, but faulted some of her narrative choices: "good intentions can’t replace its responsibility to the complexities of its subject matter."

Henderson's 2021 memoir, Everything I Have Is Yours: A Marriage chronicles her husband's struggles with addiction, mental illness, and an undiagnosable chronic illness, and the author's own struggles as wife, mother, and caregiver. It was well-received by critics, with Library Journal calling it an "intimate, absorbing, and painful look at chronic illness in a relationship." The book was included in The New York Times' year-end list of "100 Notable Books of 2021."

== Personal life ==
Henderson is married and has two children.
