= Silent Night (2021 film) =

2021 British apocalyptic black comedy film

- Official release poster
- Directed by: Camille Griffin
- Written by: Camille Griffin
- Produced by: Celine Rattray; Trudie Styler; Matthew Vaughn
- Starring: Keira Knightley; Matthew Goode; Roman Griffin Davis; Annabelle Wallis; Lily-Rose Depp; Sope Dirisu; Kirby Howell-Baptiste; Lucy Punch; Rufus Jones; Davida McKenzie
- Cinematography: Sam Renton
- Edited by: Martin Walsh; Pia Di Ciaula
- Music by: Lorne Balfe
- Production companies: Marv Studios; Maven Screen Media; Endeavor Content
- Distributed by: Altitude Film Distribution (United Kingdom); AMC+ RLJE Films (United States)
- Release dates: 16 September 2021 (TIFF); 3 December 2021 (United States/United Kingdom)
- Running time: 92 minutes
- Countries: United Kingdom; United States
- Language: English

Silent Night is a 2021 apocalyptic black comedy film written and directed by Camille Griffin. The film stars Keira Knightley, Matthew Goode, Roman Griffin Davis, Annabelle Wallis, Lily-Rose Depp, Sope Dirisu, Kirby Howell-Baptiste, Lucy Punch, Rufus Jones, and Davida McKenzie.

The film features a group of friends who reunite for one final Christmas night before an ambiguous apocalypse will wipe all of humanity out.

Silent Night had its world premiere at the Toronto International Film Festival on 16 September 2021, and was released on 3 December 2021 in the United Kingdom by Altitude Film Distribution and in the United States by AMC+ / RLJE Films.

== Plot ==
Married couple Nell and Simon host a yearly Christmas dinner at their country estate for their former school friends and their spouses. This Christmas is a special occasion with everyone dressing in formal wear and the children being allowed to swear. It is gradually revealed that because of an imminent environmental catastrophe in which a gigantic rolling poisonous gas cloud (which follows minutes after numerous smaller green tornadoes that are generally considered as heralds of the upcoming danger) is killing most life forms, the British government has issued suicide pills for a quick and easy death before the cloud hits Britain. The suicide pills were delivered to the entire population, except for the homeless and illegal migrants. Nell, Simon, and the rest of their friends have made a suicide pact to take the pills and give them to their children. However, while James agrees with his friends over the decision, his young wife Sophie has recently discovered she is pregnant and is still unsure whether to take the pill.

There are several confrontations during the night: Kitty is given a doll that resembles her, and she hugs her father, but refuses to hug Sandra even though she begs her to; Art finds the act of gift giving ridiculous, so he lashes out at the adults and runs from the room; Sandra tells James she had loved him when they were in school and wondered why they never had sex; Tony gets visibly upset at her admission and claims he has never made a mistake, at which point Bella says they once had sex before he got together with Sandra; Alex feels left out during the festivities, which causes her to drink too much and pass out in her bed.

Nell, Simon and their children video chat with Nell's mother, who is abroad, to say goodbye. She sees the gas coming, so hangs up and takes the pill. The conversation leaves their eldest, Art, distressed. He begins to speculate that the government and the scientists are wrong. Art approaches James and Sophie with his fears. Sophie then reveals to him that she is pregnant thus she does not want to take the pill. Art tells his parents he will not take the pill; this culminates in him running away after a discussion. Art soon discovers a family, including a baby, on the side of the road. They are dead, and there are several packs of the pill in the car. Shocked, Art begins to scream as the small green tornadoes twist around him; his screams allow Simon to find him and he carries him home.

After returning home, the group realizes it is past midnight and time to take their pills. They divide into their separate rooms to say goodbye. Art passes out and Nell holds him, while Simon gives his children the pills. The boys ask for drinks to take the pills, so Simon gets them fizzy drinks. Meanwhile, James pressures Sophie to take the pill saying he will not unless she does too, and they eventually take them. Bella attempts to wake Alex to take her pill and makes her take it while she is very drunk, but she wakes and vomits the pill. Bella tells her they have five minutes and while in the kitchen they dance and Bella uses the diversion to stab Alex. Both die soon after. Tony, Kitty and Sandra all lie in a bed to await death when Kitty remembers her doll and runs to get it while Sandra again begs her for a hug. When Kitty returns, she sees her parents are dead and she crawls between them, finally hugging Sandra. Nell notices that Art has bled through his eyes, nose, and ears. Frightened, the whole family rapidly take their pills, and lie next to Art.

The following morning, it is seen that everyone is dead. The final shot focuses on Art, who suddenly opens his eyes.

== Cast ==
- Keira Knightley as Nell, the gathering's host
- Matthew Goode as Simon, Nell's husband
- Roman Griffin Davis as Artur (Art), Nell's and Simon's older son
- Hardy and Gilby Griffin Davis as Hardy and Thomas, Nell's and Simon's younger twin sons
- Annabelle Wallis as Sandra, Nell's sister
- Rufus Jones as Tony, Sandra's husband
- Davida McKenzie as Kitty, Sandra's and Tony's daughter
- Sope Dirisu as James, Nell's and Sandra's childhood friend
- Lily-Rose Depp as Sophie, James's wife
- Kirby Howell-Baptiste as Alex
- Lucy Punch as Bella, Alex's wife

== Production ==
It was announced in January 2020 that Camille Griffin would make her feature debut with the film, with Keira Knightley, Roman Griffin Davis, Matthew Goode and Annabelle Wallis set to star. Lily-Rose Depp, Kirby Howell-Baptiste, Davida McKenzie, Rufus Jones, Sope Dirisu and Lucy Punch were cast the next month, with filming beginning on 17 February.

The film's score was composed by Lorne Balfe.

== Release ==
It had its world premiere at the Toronto International Film Festival on 16 September 2021. Prior to, RLJE Films and AMC+ acquired U.S. distribution rights to the film. It was released in the United Kingdom and United States on 3 December 2021.

== Reception ==
On the review aggregator website Rotten Tomatoes, 67% of 120 critics' reviews are positive. The website's consensus reads: "Spending time with these characters can be a lot to ask, but Silent Night peers into the abyss with admirable aplomb."Metacritic, which uses a weighted average, assigned the film a score of 52 out of 100, based on 22 critics, indicating "mixed or average" reviews.

== See also ==
- Christmas horror
- List of Christmas films
