= Human Capital (2019 film) =

2019 film directed by Marc Meyers

- Theatrical release poster
- Directed by: Marc Meyers
- Written by: Oren Moverman
- Based on: Human Capital by Stephen Amidon
- Produced by: Celine Rattray; Trudie Styler; Oren Moverman; Bert Marcus; Matthew Stillman; Liev Schreiber
- Starring: Liev Schreiber; Marisa Tomei; Peter Sarsgaard; Maya Hawke; Alex Wolff; Betty Gabriel; Aasif Mandvi; Paul Sparks; Fred Hechinger
- Cinematography: Kat Westergaard
- Edited by: Tariq Anwar; Alex Hall
- Music by: Marcelo Zarvos
- Production companies: Maven Pictures; Bert Marcus Film
- Distributed by: Vertical Entertainment; DirecTV Cinema
- Release dates: September 10, 2019 (TIFF); July 17, 2020 (United States)
- Running time: 95 minutes
- Countries: United States; Italy
- Language: English
- Box office: $6,597

Human Capital is a 2019 American-Italian drama film directed by Marc Meyers. The screenplay by Oren Moverman is based on the 2004 Stephen Amidon novel of the same name, which was also adapted into the 2013 Italian film by Paolo Virzì. The film stars Liev Schreiber, Marisa Tomei, Peter Sarsgaard, Maya Hawke, Alex Wolff, Betty Gabriel, Aasif Mandvi, Paul Sparks and Fred Hechinger.

The film premiered on September 10, 2019 at the Toronto International Film Festival. It was released through DirecTV Cinema on February 20, 2020, before being theatrically released on July 17, 2020, by Vertical Entertainment.

== Premise ==
The lives of two different families collide when their children begin a relationship that leads to a tragic accident.

== Cast ==
- Liev Schreiber as Drew Hagel
- Alex Wolff as Ian Warfield
- Marisa Tomei as Carrie Manning
- Peter Sarsgaard as Quint Manning
- Maya Hawke as Shannon Hagel
- Betty Gabriel as Ronnie Hagel
- Paul Sparks as Jon
- Aasif Mandvi as Godeep
- Fred Hechinger as Jamie Manning
- Maxwell Whittington-Cooper as Brendon
- Alex Yiakoumatos as Manning Twin #1
- Nick Yiakoumatos as Manning Twin #2
- Daryl Edwards as Detective Gore

== Production ==
A film adaptation of Human Capital was first developed in 2004. Film producer Lemore Syvan, of Elevation Filmworks, purchased the film rights to the book and hired Noam Murro to direct. The original author Stephen Amidon was picked to adapt the book.

It was announced in October 2018 that Liev Schreiber and Alex Wolff were cast to star in the film, with Marc Meyers directing. Filming began in New York City in November, with Marisa Tomei, Peter Sarsgaard, Maya Hawke and Betty Gabriel also joining. Paul Sparks, Aasif Mandvi and Fred Hechinger were added in December. The film was produced by Celine Rattray and Trudie Styler of Maven Pictures and Bert Marcus of Bert Marcus Film.

== Release ==
Human Capital premiered at the Toronto International Film Festival on September 10, 2019. Shortly after, Vertical Entertainment and DirecTV Cinema acquired distribution rights to the film. It was released through DirecTV Cinema on March 20, 2020, followed by a limited theatrical release on July 17, 2020.

== Reception ==
As of October 2021, 67% of the 63 reviews compiled on review aggregator website Rotten Tomatoes are positive and the average is 6/10. The site's critical consensus reads, "Human Capital merely rumbles when it ought to roar to life, but it remains a solidly made opportunity for a strong cast to highlight its impressive talents." On Metacritic, the film holds a rating of 51 out of 100 based on 10 critics, indicating "mixed or average" reviews.

Writing in The Hollywood Reporter, John Defore said that it is "engrossing on a moment-to-moment scale" but "doesn't click together". Noel Murray of the Los Angeles Times wrote that each storyline is "gripping until they peter out". The New York Times' critic, Wesley Morris, called it "a character study that hasn’t done its homework". Alan Ng of Film Threat wrote that the film is "a fantastic study of people being pushed to their limits" and has "a series of excellent performances". Hannah Hoolihan of Screen Rant wrote, "Meyers' disjointed approach to Human Capital expertly weaves its story into a gripping mystery that's further elevated by exceptional performances."
