= Boarding School (2018 film) =

- Theatrical release poster
- Directed by: Boaz Yakin
- Written by: Boaz Yakin
- Produced by: Jonathan Gray; Scott Lochmus; Jason Orans; Celine Rattray; Trudie Styler
- Starring: Luke Prael; Sterling Jerins; Will Patton
- Cinematography: Mike Simpson
- Edited by: Martin Brinkler
- Music by: Lesley Barber
- Production companies: Farcaster Films; Gigantic Pictures; Maven Pictures; Old Greenwich Capital Partners; Storyland Pictures
- Distributed by: Momentum Pictures; Global Road Entertainment
- Release date: August 31, 2018 (United States)
- Running time: 105 minutes
- Country: United States
- Language: English

Boarding School is a 2018 American horror film written and directed by Boaz Yakin and starring Luke Prael, Sterling Jerins, and Will Patton. The plot is about a boy who is sent to a remote boarding school and discovers something sinister occurring there. The film was first released in the US on August 31, 2018.

== Plot ==
Jacob Rathbone is a 12-year-old boy with a fear of the dark who lives with his stepfather, Davis, and his mother, Isabel, who is frustrated with her son's frequent night terrors. After being discovered dancing while dressed in his late grandmother's dress and being suspended from his school (after being bullied for his obsession with his late grandmother), Jacob is sent away to a boarding school in the wilderness governed by the eccentric couple, Dr. and Mrs. Sherman.

Jacob meets his classmates: twins Lenny and Calvin, and social outcasts like burn survivor Phil, Tourette's sufferer Frederic, autistic Elwood Ramsay, and manipulative Christine Holcomb, the daughter of Davis' boss, Mr. Holcomb (whom Jacob met on one evening when he and his parents had dinner with her family). Their classes are administered under Dr. Sherman's strict regime that consists of Bible studies sessions and corporal punishments.

Not long after, Frederic is discovered dead half-naked in the bathroom in apparent suicide by hanging. Christine uses this opportunity to flee the school with Jacob, only to be caught and brought back. Dr. Sherman reveals that Christine was sent there as a result of having murdered her older brother, Timothy, and driving her mother to commit suicide. Christine lures Jacob to her room, where she confesses to talking Frederic into trying out autoerotic asphyxiation and pushing him to death to cause a distraction to escape. She blackmails Jacob into dancing with her, during which she attempts to stab him with a pair of scissors but he overpowers her. In a display of masochistic tendencies, she professes her love for him and claims she wanted to provoke Jacob into beating her up.

Jacob later finds Elwood dead in bed. An argument between Dr. and Mrs. Sherman – whose real identity is Lynn Adams – reveals that she was the one who murdered Elwood, and that the children will all die that night. He finds the corpses of Frederic, as well as the real Dr. and Mrs. Sherman, stuffed in the basement freezer. A conversation between Mrs. Ramsay and Dr. Sherman suggests a prior arrangement where, being unable to cope with Elwood's condition, Mrs. Ramsay had sent him there to be killed off seemingly in an accident – a fate that awaits all the other children. Ms. Adams stabs Mrs. Ramsay to death; Dr. Sherman slits Ms. Adams' throat and kills the groundskeeper.

Dr. Sherman reveals to Jacob that he has been contract killing since he was around Jacob's age, and his plan is to have everyone in the house killed in a fire. Jacob also finds out that it was Davis' idea to send him there to be rid of him. Jacob manages to bludgeon Dr. Sherman to death and set him on fire.

He evacuates everyone except Christine, whom he leaves for dead as a way of avenging Frederic. Having declared his love for Christine, Jacob peels off his dress, showing his true, naked self to his friends for the first time. Now rescued, the children reunite with their parents, as Jacob whispers to Phil's father that he knows of his intention, and promises to make him regret it if anything happens to Phil.

Throughout the film, the audience is shown flashbacks of Jacob's recluse grandmother Feiga. Forced into hiding during World War II, she sharpened her teeth with a nail file, while her compatriot, Tsipi was frequently raped and tortured by a Nazi soldier in exchange for being spared.

Back at home, having finally overcome his fear of the dark, Jacob waits as Isabel's terrified screams are heard from the dinner table. Davis dies from ingesting poisoned wine (the same poison Dr. Sherman used on Mrs. Ramsay). Jacob taints his lips red with blood, mirroring Feiga ripping out the Nazi's throat with her fangs; suggesting that just like Feiga, hardships have made him a fighter.

== Cast ==
- Luke Prael as Jacob Rathbone
- Nadia Alexander as Phil
- Sterling Jerins as Christine Holcomb
- Nico Oliveri (credited as Nicholas J. Oliveri) as Elwood Ramsay
- Christopher Dylan White as Frederic
- Will Patton as Dr. Sherman
- Tammy Blanchard as Mrs. Sherman/Lynn Adams
- Samantha Mathis as Isabel
- Robert John Burke as Mr. Holcomb
- Kobi George as Lenny
- Kadin George as Calvin
- Barbara Kingsley as Elderly Tsipi
- Allison Winn as Young Tsipi
- Sonya Balsara as Young Feiga
- Tim Haber as Nazi Soldier
- David Aaron Baker as Davis Rathbone
- Charlotte Ubben as Mrs. Holcomb
- Chris LaPanta as Claude
- Stephen Bogardus as Phil's Father
- Lucy Walters as Mrs. Ramsay

== Reception ==
On Rotten Tomatoes the film has a 33% rating based on reviews from nine critics, with an average rating of 4.6 from 10. Metacritic gives it a weighted average score of 45 out of 100 based on reviews from 5 critics, indicating "mixed or average" reviews.

Dennis Harvey of Variety called the film a "conceptually muddled mix of quasi-horror" and concluded that it is "too slowly paced to deliver much excitement, let alone scares, while its respectable packaging elements are too conservative to provide enough atmosphere."

John DeFore of The Hollywood Reporter laments that "Yakin's script wants to deal with some big issues" but "looking cool isn't quite enough to drive the action home."

Nick Allen of RogerEbert.com gave it 1½ stars, writing, "Yakin's film offers little clarity with all of its hammy, left-field ideas, in spite of their originality when packaged as a horror movie." He also opined that the acting by the young cast "is nothing to write home about".

Noel Murray of the Los Angeles Times complimented the ornate sets and Yakin's skills in generating atmosphere and tension. He concluded: " ...this is more a surreal, nightmarish and occasionally sexually explicit trip into an adolescent's psyche than a spook show. Yakin uses genre packaging for an intense, personal film, which many viewers may find discomfiting – if only because it's so hard to classify."
