= Mickey Sumner =

English actress (born 1984)

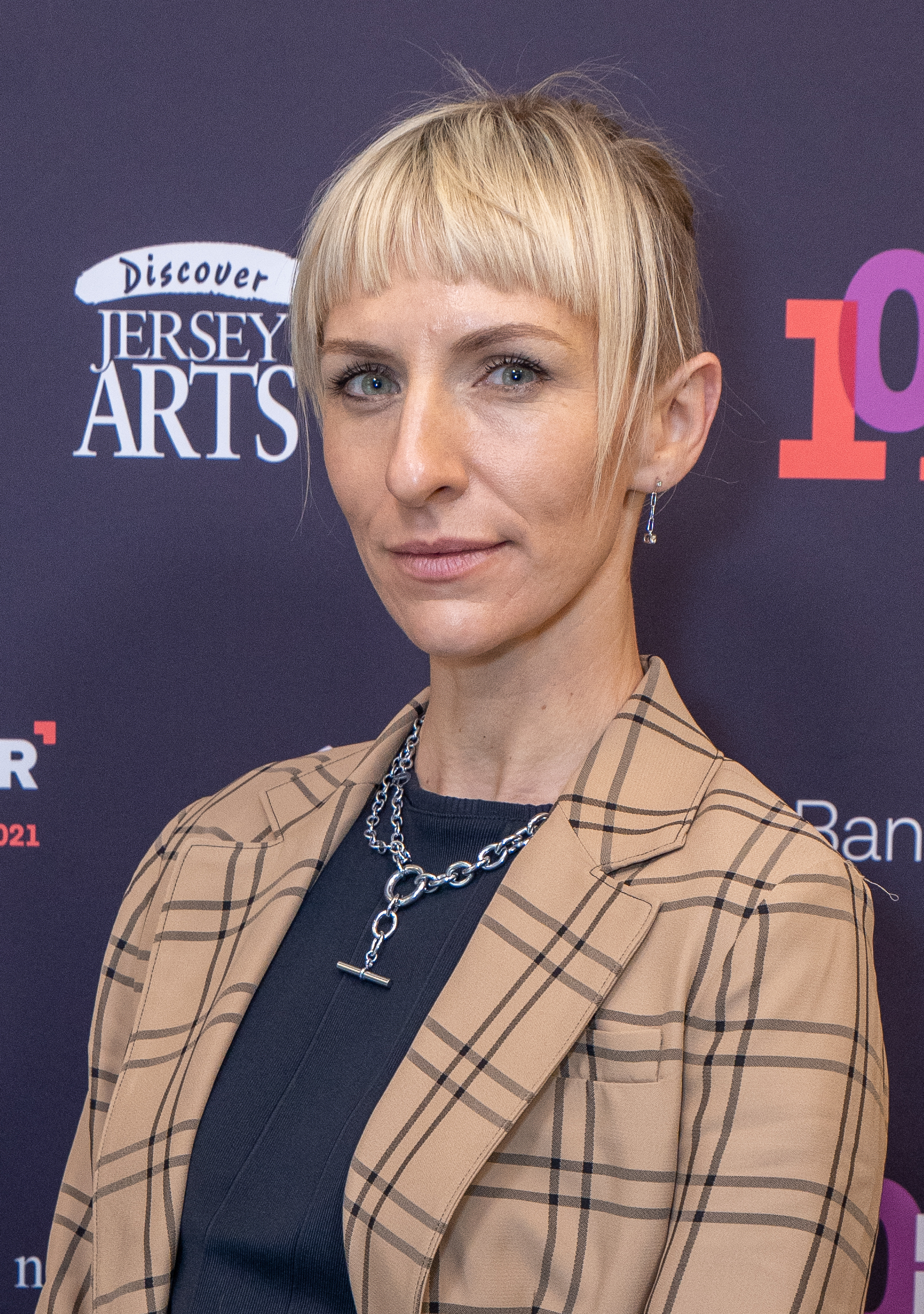
- Sumner in 2021
- Born: Brigitte Michael Sumner; 19 January 1984 (age 42); West End, London, England
- Occupation: Actress
- Years active: 2006–present
- Spouse: Chris Kantrowitz (m. 2017; sep. 2022)
- Children: 1
- Parents: Sting (father); Trudie Styler (mother)

Brigitte Michael "Mickey" Sumner (born 19 January 1984) is an English actress best known for her film roles as Sophie Levee in Frances Ha (2012) and Farrah in The Mend (2014) and her television roles as Katia on Low Winter Sun (2013) and Bess Till on Snowpiercer (2020). She also portrayed Patti Smith in CBGB (2013).

Sumner is the daughter of actress Trudie Styler and rock musician Sting.

== Early life ==
Sumner was born at Portland Hospital in London, the oldest daughter of musician Sting (born Gordon Matthew Thomas Sumner) and actress Trudie Styler. Sumner is the older sister of musician Eliot Sumner and the younger half-sister of musician Joe Sumner.

== Career ==
Sumner began her acting career in 2006 with roles in a series of short films. In 2011, she landed the role of Francesca on the Showtime series The Borgias appearing in four episodes. Sumner garnered significant attention for her role as Sophie Levee, starring opposite Greta Gerwig, in 2012's Frances Ha.

In 2013, Sumner portrayed Patti Smith in CBGB. She also made her official off-Broadway debut opposite Carol Kane in the Atlantic Theater Company's The Lying Lesson in April 2013.

Sumner was featured as Katia on the AMC Network series Low Winter Sun. In 2013, Sumner acted in a series of films including Half the Perfect World, The Mend and Anesthesia.

Sumner starred in the independent film The Mend, alongside Josh Lucas and Stephen Plunkett. The film premiered at the SXSW Film Festival in March 2014.

== Personal life ==
Sumner became engaged to Chris Kantrowitz in June 2016, they married in Tuscany the following year. In 2022, the couple, who have a son together, separated.

In March 2025, Sumner became engaged to photographer/director, Carter B Smith.

== Filmography ==
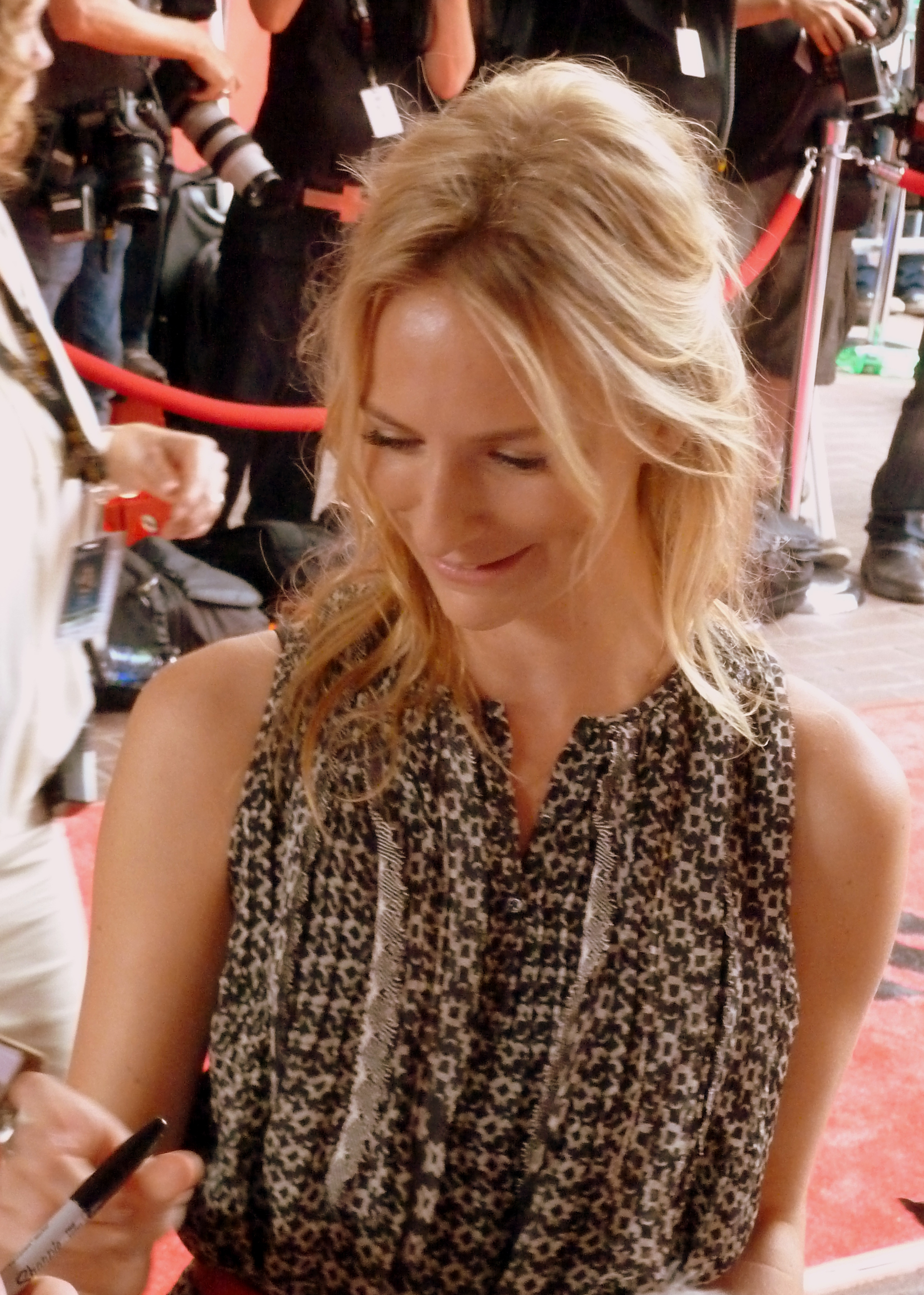
Sumner in 2012

=== Film ===
Year	Title	Role	Note
2008	Last Chance Harvey	Friend of the Bride	
2009	Black Water Transit	Attractive Hotel Receptionist	
2012	Missed Connections	Lucy Foster	
2012	Frances Ha	Sophie	
2012	Girl Most Likely	Hannah	
2013	CBGB	Patti Smith	
2014	The Mend	Farrah	
2014	The End of the Tour	Betsy	
2015	Mistress America	Fake Brooke	
2015	This is Happening	Megan	
2015	Anesthesia	Nicole	
2016	All at Once	Bridget	
2016	Half the Perfect World	Bridget	
2017	Freak Show	Dr. Veronica Vickers	
2017	Caught	Julie	
2017	The Meyerowitz Stories	Woman at Bard	
2017	American Made	North's Aide Fawn Hall	
2017	Battle of the Sexes	Valerie Ziegenfuss	
2019	Marriage Story	Theater Actor	
2019	Where Are You	Caroline	
2021	With/In: Volume 2		Segment: "I'm Listening"; also director
2024	A Mistake	Robin	
2026	Up Against It	TBA	
2027	Blood on Snow †	TBA	Post-production

=== Television ===
Year	Title	Role	Note
2011	The Borgias	Francesca	4 episodes
2013	Low Winter Sun	Katia	6 episodes
2020–2024	Snowpiercer	Bess Till	Main cast
2025	Task	Shelley Driscoll	Miniseries
