= Solo (2022 film) =

- Directed by: Olga Pankratova
- Written by: Anton Cherenkov
- Produced by: Olga Pankratova
- Starring: Alena Bonchinche; Alexey Torgunakov; Lady Whiphead; Mikhail Kryuchkov; Kristy
- Cinematography: Roman Palchenkov
- Edited by: Konstantin Larionov
- Music by: Andre Prilepsky
- Production company: Studio Mao
- Distributed by: MVD Entertainment Group Russia World Vision
- Release dates: February 14, 2022 (Moscow, Russia)
- Running time: 1 Hour 25 minutes
- Country: Russia
- Language: Russian

Solo is a documentary film, directed and produced by Olga Pankratova. It follows six dancers, who each have a story, in six different dance genres. Classical ballet, vogue (dance), contemporary, hip-hop, pole dance, and Krump. The film had its world premiere on February 14, 2022, at the renowned Karo 11 October in Moscow, Russia. Alexey Chadov, Dmitry Krasilov and other celebrities were present at the premiere of this documentary. Distribution rights for Russia/CIS were acquired by Russia World Vision (RWV) on December 19, 2021., and on April 16, 2022, North American streaming and DVD rights were acquired by MVD Entertainment Group.

== Cast ==
- Mikhail Kryuchkov
- Alena Bonchinche
- Alexey Torgunakov
- Kristy
- Dmitry Politov
- Lady Whiphead

== Production ==
In 2014, Olga Pankratova won the Audience Award at Moscow State University for the short film Solo. The film was supported by the Ministry of Culture (Russia), Studio Mao, DA Records, and Canon Inc.

The film's score was composed by Andre Prilepsky.

=== Filming ===
Principal photography started in 2018 in Russia, France, Germany, and Poland.
