= Alpha Male (film) =

- Film poster
- Directed by: Dan Wilde
- Written by: Dan Wilde
- Produced by: David Bergstein; Damian Jones; Trudie Styler
- Starring: Jennifer Ehle; Danny Huston
- Cinematography: Shane Daly
- Edited by: Tariq Anwar
- Music by: Stephen Warbeck
- Production companies: Mobius International; Xingu Films
- Distributed by: THINKFilm
- Release dates: August 11, 2006 (London); March 18, 2008 (DVD)
- Running time: 100 minutes
- Countries: United States; United Kingdom
- Language: English

Alpha Male is a 2006 American-British drama film directed by Dan Wilde and starring Jennifer Ehle and Danny Huston.

== Plot ==
Alice Ferris is a wealthy mother who lives with her family in their stately home set in the peaceful countryside of Bedfordshire. She is happily married to her American husband Jim, a businessman who owns a packaging company, and they have two children Jack and Elyssa.

One day, Jim is diagnosed with an incurable illness and soon passes away. Alice’s eldest sister Brede moves in temporarily to support her. Elyssa is traumatised by her father’s passing, so Alice and Brede send her off to a children’s clinic to recover. Soon afterwards, Alice meets and falls in love with a painter named Clive, who has recently been through a similar loss. Alice lets Clive move into the family’s home, to which Jack disapproves. At this point, Jack becomes estranged from Alice and hostile to Clive.

Several years later, Jack turns 21 and now lives with his girlfriend named Maliika. For his birthday, Alice arranges a party and asks him to come. He refuses at first, but then agrees to go. At the party, Alice and Clive’s son Nathan falls into the family’s pool and almost drowns, but is saved by Jack. Elyssa, also grown up, sees a manifestation of Jim who helps her overcome her trauma. In the end, the family put their differences aside and make a reconciliation.

== Cast ==
- Jennifer Ehle as Alice Ferris
- Danny Huston as Jim Ferris
- Patrick Baladi as Clive Lamis
- Trudie Styler as Brede Norton
- Amelia Warner as Elyssa Ferris
- Mark Wells as Jack Ferris

== Reception ==
Mark Stevens of the BBC gave the film three stars out of five.
