= Capitol Films =

British film production

Capitol Films Limited
- Industry: Motion pictures
- Founded: 6 June 1989; 37 years ago
- Founder: Sharon Harrell
- Defunct: 7 May 2013; 13 years ago
- Fate: Bankruptcy
- Headquarters: Los Angeles, California, United States; London, England, United Kingdom
- Parent: Mobius Pictures
- Subsidiaries: ThinkFilm

Capitol Films was a British film production and distribution company (number 02392790), incorporated on 6 June 1989 and dissolved on 7 May 2013. In January 2006 it was sold to American Mobius Pictures, owned by entrepreneur and film producer David Bergstein, who placed it at the hub of his Pegasus Studios. In early 2010, David Bergstein's appointment as director for the British company was terminated and the company was placed in receivership. In October 2010 the US branch of the company was forced into bankruptcy, and in January 2012 a group of creditors filed a proposal with a federal bankruptcy court in Los Angeles to take over and liquidate five companies formerly controlled by David Bergstein, among them Capitol Films.

Capitol Films was involved in the production of some fifty films, among them Radio Inside (1994), A Good Man in Africa (1994), Death and the Maiden (1994), Wilde (1997), Dancing at Lughnasa (1998), Gosford Park (2001), Elvis Has Left the Building (2004), and Lucky Number Slevin (2006).
