= Five Dollars a Day =

- Theatrical release poster
- Directed by: Nigel Cole
- Written by: Tippi Dobrofsky; Neal H. Dobrofsky
- Produced by: Carol Baum; Jane Goldenring; Kia Jam
- Starring: Christopher Walken; Alessandro Nivola; Amanda Peet; Sharon Stone
- Cinematography: Peter Donahue
- Edited by: Susan Littenberg
- Music by: Alex Wurman
- Production company: Capitol Films
- Distributed by: Image Entertainment
- Release dates: September 6, 2008 (Toronto International Film Festival); April 24, 2009 (United States)
- Running time: 98 minutes
- Country: United States
- Language: English

Five Dollars a Day (also spelled as $5 a Day) is a 2008 American comedy-drama film directed by Nigel Cole, produced by Capitol Films and starring Christopher Walken, Alessandro Nivola, Amanda Peet, and Sharon Stone.

== Plot ==
Richie Flynn Parker is a seemingly successful man living in Los Angeles, California who has just broken up with his girlfriend Maggie. He has also just been fired from his job as a health inspector when he discovers his father Nat, a cheap con-man, has a terminal brain tumor and he wants to see Richie. Richie, believing it's another con, grudgingly goes to Atlantic City to see his father who explains he has been living on five dollars a day, going to extremes to do so, such as constantly calling various radio station contests with different aliases to win things, like concert tickets he can then scalp. Nat shows Ritchie an x-ray of his skull, and asks Ritchie to drive him to New Mexico to seek a potential cure. The father and son hit the road driving a Sweet'n Low car free of charge provided they get gas at Chevron stations along the way. Richie calls his girlfriend to tell her about his life and the trip, using one of Nat's many free cell-phones with promotional minutes.

After their first stop to eat at an IHOP restaurant for free by Nat convincing them it's his birthday using a fake drivers license (which Nat continues to do at other IHOPs along the way), they stop at a vacant house that is for sale to spend the night, and narrowly avoid being found out by a realtor and some people looking at the home the following morning. The next day over a stolen room service meal from a motel, Richie finds out that Nat got him fired by telling his boss of an earlier jail sentence, which is later revealed that Richie took the fall for to keep Nat from going to jail for one of his crimes. This almost makes Richie abandon the trip. They proceed to drive to various cities, once staying at an open house for a retirement village. They then go to Amarillo, Texas, where they meet up with Richie's old babysitter, Dolores Jones, who is now a professional model Nat has a thing for.

They then head to New Mexico so that Nat can collect a small sum of money from an old rival, Bert Kruger, whom Nat lent money to start a used car dealership many years back, and whom Richie's mother later ran off with when he was young. Kruger, now owner of a hugely successful chain of car dealerships, and a well established member of the community with wife and family, agrees to give Nat a large sum of quiet money so that Nat does not upset Kruger's plans to run for mayor by embarrassing Kruger regarding Ritchie's paternity.

Flush with cash, Nat suggests to Richie that the two of them visit Las Vegas to spend some time together, but Richie soon realizes that Nat is not his actual father and Nat convinces him that his story about being sick was a ruse to get him to travel with him to New Mexico. Upset with this news, Richie runs off with the hush money and sneaks into Kruger's campaign kick-off party to confront him. Not satisfied with how Kruger responds, Richie rushes the campaign stage to announce Kruger's paternity and simulates the return of the hush money.

After escaping capture by campaign security, Richie returns to the hotel where he meets back up with Nat. After some discussion, Nat collapses and winds up in the hospital, actually very ill. Maggie shows up after Richie calls her to break the news. They sneak Nat out of the hospital, and Nat takes Richie to a beached boat house near the shore of a desert lake, where the two go skinny dipping.

Later, Richie and Maggie are shown sitting in a row boat on the lake, scattering Nat's ashes from a makeshift urn consisting of a large Pepsi cup that Nat got for free with a five dollar purchase of gas. The boat begins to sink as they laugh at their circumstance.

== Cast ==
- Christopher Walken as Nat Parker
- Alessandro Nivola as Richie Flynn Parker
- Sharon Stone as Dolores Jones
- Amanda Peet as Maggie
- Peter Coyote as Bert Kruger
- Dean Cain as Rick Carlson
- Mike Miller as Pharmaceutical CEO
- Chris Dempsey as Tim Webber
- Chris Ranney as Pharmaceutical Rep #2
- Jim Burleson as Orderly

== Background ==
The project dates back to 2003 when Nick Cassavetes had signed on to direct for Fine Line Features, but a year later was replaced by John Curran. Three years later Nigel Cole was sitting in the director's chair. Five Dollars a Day was shot on 16mm film and premiered at the 2008 Toronto International Film Festival.
