= Ten Thousand Saints =

- Theatrical release poster
- Directed by: Shari Springer Berman Robert Pulcini
- Written by: Shari Springer Berman; Robert Pulcini
- Based on: Ten Thousand Saints by Eleanor Henderson
- Produced by: Anne Carey; Jon L. Wanzek; Amy Nauioka; Trudie Styler; Celine Rattray; Luca Borghese; Datari Turner
- Starring: Asa Butterfield; Hailee Steinfeld; Ethan Hawke; Avan Jogia; Emile Hirsch; Emily Mortimer
- Cinematography: Ben Kutchins
- Edited by: Robert Pulcini
- Music by: Gareth Stevenson
- Distributed by: Screen Media Films
- Release dates: January 23, 2015 (Sundance); August 14, 2015 (United States)
- Running time: 113 minutes
- Country: United States
- Language: English
- Budget: $5 million

Ten Thousand Saints is a 2015 American drama film written and directed by Shari Springer Berman and Robert Pulcini. It is based on the novel of the same name by Eleanor Henderson. The film stars Asa Butterfield as Jude Keffy-Horn, the protagonist of the story.

The film premiered at the 2015 Sundance Film Festival on January 23, 2015.

The film was released in a limited release and through video on demand on August 14, 2015 by Screen Media Films.

== Plot ==
Sixteen-year-old Jude Keffy-Horn is living in Vermont with his adoptive mother Harriet and adoptive sister Prudence. In December 1987, Jude and his best friend, Teddy, spend their time doing drugs and dreaming about moving to New York City to escape their small home town. Jude’s permissive hippy father, Les, lives in New York City where he grows and sells marijuana. Les' girlfriend Diane has a daughter Eliza who buses to Vermont for New Year's Eve.

Teddy and Jude meet Eliza at the bus station and take her to a New Year's Eve party. Jude is beaten up outside the party, while Teddy and Eliza talk and have sex in a locked bathroom after Eliza introduces Teddy to cocaine, which they both snort. When they part for the night, Teddy asks Eliza to find his straight edge brother Johnny in New York City and check on him since Johnny doesn't have a phone. Eliza heads back to NYC on the bus while Teddy and Jude head home, stopping to huff Freon. When Harriet awakens she finds Jude unconscious and Teddy dead and frozen after both of them pass out in the yard.

Eliza finds Teddy’s half-brother in Alphabet City, Johnny, and discovers he is not only straight edge but also a Hare Krishna devotee. She tells him to call home because Teddy is worried. When he calls, his drug addict mom answers and tells him about Teddy's death.

Eliza discovers she's pregnant with Teddy's baby, and when she tells Johnny and Jude, they decide to keep it a secret. Even though Johnny is a still closeted gay, he eventually proposes to Eliza out of guilt and loyalty to his deceased half-brother. They tell her mother that the baby is his and that they are going to be married. Since Eliza is under 18 and her mother refuses to sign for her to be legally married, the two have a marriage ceremony in the Hare Krishna temple.

They borrow Les' van and, because her mother is still against the pregnancy, take Eliza to stay with Harriet while Johnny's band Army of One goes on tour. Jude becomes the new guitar player when Rooster, the original guitar player (whom it is implied Johnny has had a secret relationship with) quits. They come back from tour, and Johnny goes back to New York City, leaving Eliza feeling abandoned. She also confides in Jude that she thinks Johnny may be in love with someone else. Jude, while on tour, overhearing a telephone call between Johnny and Rooster, realizes it is Rooster whom Johnny wants to be with. Realizing it is not his secret to tell, he does not tell Eliza but stops feeling guilty for being in love with her. After realizing they care for each other, Jude and Eliza start a relationship.

Jude and Eliza take a bus back to New York where they plan to raise the baby. They go to NY to confront Johnny. He reveals he's been in communication with Teddy's biological father, and that he wants the baby to be given to Teddy's father. Eliza is outraged feeling betrayed because she wants to raise the baby and runs out of the apartment into the middle of the Tompkins Square Park Riots where she goes into labor. Jude chases after her and comforts her after finding her in the chaos. Later, after Eliza gives birth at the hospital, she asks Jude to hold her baby boy.

As the film ends, Johnny throws Teddy’s ashes into the river with Rooster beside him, while Jude narrates from ten years later about how Eliza is in Brooklyn starting her own family and how he too is going to be a father, hinting that they may still be together. The closing shot is of Eliza and Teddy's now 10-year-old son happily playing in a park.

== Cast ==
- Asa Butterfield as Jude Keffy-Horn, a teenage boy who is trying to reconnect with his father in 1988 Manhattan after his best friend Teddy dies of a drug overdose and hypothermia. He befriends Teddy's brother who is straight edge and in a hardcore punk–style band.
- Avan Jogia as Teddy McNicholas, Jude's best friend who dies due to hypothermia and a drug overdose. He is the father of Eliza's child
- Hailee Steinfeld as Eliza Urbanski, a 17-year-old girl who is pregnant with Teddy's child and is Jude's love interest. Her mother Di is dating Jude's father Les
- Ethan Hawke as Les Keffy, Jude's adoptive father and a drug dealer, who is trying to reconnect with his son
- Emile Hirsch as Johnny, Teddy's straight edge half-brother and tattoo artist who finds kinship with Jude after he moves to Manhattan
- Julianne Nicholson as Harriet Horn, Jude's adoptive mother from Vermont
- Emily Mortimer as Di Urbanski, a ballet dancer, Eliza's mother, Les' girlfriend
- Nadia Alexander as Prudence Keffy-Horn, Jude's adoptive sister from Vermont

== Production ==
Shari Springer Berman and Robert Pulcini became interested in adapting the novel after Berman read it. She remarked, "I read the book and I loved how human the characters were and how flawed, yet well-meaning, they were, which I think is a very truthful thing about most people. I loved that era in New York. I thought it was such an exciting time for me, so there was a personal connection. It was this time when New York was really scruffy and dangerous, and there was crime, violence, crack, and AIDS – a lot of very horrible things, but also excitement and creative opportunity. You could be an artist and live in Manhattan in a squat and pay no rent. It seems inconceivable right now." In addition, Berman also was interested in the parenting aspect of the story, adding, "One of the things in the book that’s so interesting – and I had friends like this – are people who were raised by parents who were hippies and didn’t give them a lot of rules and boundaries. The question is, how do you rebel against the people who invented rebellion? [Laughs] Because youth is about rebelling. I think there’s an element of that in straight edge, which became very popular around that time with young people who were rebelling against what they thought was screwing up their parents. There was something seductive and rebellious about being sober and not being promiscuous [Laughs]."

Hailee Steinfeld was announced to be in talks for the role of Eliza in October 2013, and was cast in December of that year. Asa Butterfield and Ethan Hawke were cast earlier before Steinfeld. Emile Hirsch, Julianne Nicholson, Emily Mortimer and Nadia Alexander were cast in early 2014. Avan Jogia was cast as Teddy in early February 2014. Filming started in New York City on January 27, 2014 and ended on March 3, 2014.

== Release ==
The film had its world premiere at the Sundance Film Festival on January 23, 2015. Shortly after it was announced, Screen Media Films had acquired all distribution rights to the film. The film went on to premiere at the Provincetown International Film Festival on June 17, 2015. The film was released on August 14, 2015 in a limited release and through video on demand.

== Reception ==
Ten Thousand Saints received mixed reviews. On review aggregator website Rotten Tomatoes, the film holds an approval rating of 58%, based on 36 reviews, with a weighted average score of 6.18/10. On Metacritic, the film has a score of 62%, based on 12 critics, indicating "generally favorable reviews".
