= Freak Show (film) =

2017 American comedy-drama film

- Theatrical release poster
- Directed by: Trudie Styler
- Screenplay by: Patrick J. Clifton; Beth Rigazio
- Based on: Freak Show by James St. James
- Produced by: Jeffrey Coulter; Bryan Rabin; Trudie Styler; Celine Rattray; Charlotte Ubben; Ember Truesdell; Chris Miller
- Starring: Alex Lawther; Abigail Breslin; AnnaSophia Robb; Ian Nelson; Celia Weston; Laverne Cox; Bette Midler
- Cinematography: Dante Spinotti
- Edited by: Sarah Flack
- Music by: Dan Romer
- Production companies: Flower Films; Maven Pictures
- Distributed by: IFC Films
- Release dates: February 13, 2017 (Berlinale); January 12, 2018 (United States)
- Running time: 91 minutes
- Country: United States
- Language: English
- Budget: $2 million
- Box office: $20,657

Freak Show is a 2017 American comedy-drama film directed by Trudie Styler from a screenplay by Patrick J. Clifton and Beth Rigazio, based on the 2007 novel of the same name by James St. James. The film stars Alex Lawther, Abigail Breslin, AnnaSophia Robb, Ian Nelson, Celia Weston, Laverne Cox, and Bette Midler.

The film had its world premiere at the 67th Berlin International Film Festival on February 13, 2017. It was released in the United States on January 12, 2018, by IFC Films.

== Plot ==
We meet Billy Bloom gazing into the mirror, planning his make-up, and know he is no ordinary teen. Flashing back to his younger years, his indulgent, flamboyant, alcoholic mother "Muv" worships him, actively encouraging him to dress up. It causes much arguing between his mother and conservative father Bill who separate. He lives with her for seven years in Connecticut before being transported to live in his wealthy father's mansion in the deep south after her sudden disappearance (later revealed to be rehab).

Billy retreats more into his world of fantasy dress up, ignoring housekeeper Florence's advice to dress conservatively, like in jeans, for his first day at the local high school. However his idea of conservative is quite flamboyant, with eyeliner and lipstick, a ruffled pirate top, little black jacket and hat. He is ostentatiously over-familiar, leading to him being quickly ostracized.

No one speaks to him positively on the first day, but on the second, not only does Mary Jane befriend him, giving the lowdown on the most prominent students, but "Flip" Kelly introduces himself. He is the school hero, and also shows Billy his support. When the three girl clique of bullies ask Billy for fashion tips, he brilliantly tears them apart, then there's the homophobic jocks, and the loner Bernie with a deep-seated resentment towards him, a mask for something deeper. (Later on, he tries it on with him in the boys toilet, but wants to stay in the closet.)

Billy's biology teacher allows students to constantly bully him, treating him stereotypically as someone assumed to be gay. To retaliate, he wears outrageous outfits for weeks to combat the onslaught of spitballs launched at him. It culminates to the day he dons a completely outlandish, mini-length wedding gown with a veil and garish red makeup. Billy's detoured to the lecture hall, where five or six jocks beat him to within an inch of his life. Flip and another stop them, but he is in a coma for five days.

Flip visits Billy regularly during the coma, and he convinces him to help him home. After seeing Larry's Jackson Pollock, Flip opens up about his preference of art over football. Mary Jane keeps him up-to-date on developments at school, applauding his martyrdom which has paved everyone's way. The administration expelled those who attacked him and has assemblies about hate crimes to aid tolerance.

As high school is typically about conforming, fitting in and not drawing attention to yourself, Flip tries to get Billy to tone himself down during school hours. The next day, Billy does a theatrical presentation for his Great Gatsby book report dressed and acting as Zelda Fitzgerald. Later that day, an incident in gym at the rope climb, triggers a homophobic reaction towards him.

Billy comes home to find Muv. Initially believing she has come to get him, his dad lets him be present so he can see she is only there for money, as she had him to produce Bill an heir. Stunned, Billy wanders off to the kitchen and Florence is kind to him. Flip comes to see Billy, and drunken Muv falls over him.

Wandering to the school grounds, Billy announces his candidacy for homecoming queen against the other contender Lynette, queen of the school. They drum up support before they have to give campaign speeches to the school to gain their vote. Both come out on floats of their choosing, hers an unimaginative float of her with her friends in red, his a glittery, purple heel, he in a slinky silver sheath.

The team narrowly wins the homecoming game, the last play also severely injuring Flip/Mark's shoulder (so he can pursue art). In the auditorium, Lynette's speech is openly hateful towards anyone who's not straight whereas Billy's is a plea for understanding. He gets a standing ovation, yet still loses.

Billy's dad congratulates him on his victory, of facing the challenge unafraid, and speaking his truth.

== Cast ==
- Alex Lawther as Billy Bloom, a funny, good-hearted teenager and the new student at an ultra-conservative high school
  - Eddie Schweighardt as young Billy Bloom
- Abigail Breslin as Lynette, the head cheerleader and high school queen bee, and Billy's rival
- Mickey Sumner as Dr. Veronica Vickers
- Bette Midler as Muv, Billy's mother
- Larry Pine as Billy's father
- AnnaSophia Robb as Blah Blah Blah / Mary Jane
- Ian Nelson as Mark "Flip" Kelly, Billy's friend
- Lorraine Toussaint as Flossie, Billy's nanny
- Laverne Cox as Felicia, a reporter
- Willa Fitzgerald as Tiffany
- Celia Weston as Florence
- Walden Hudson as Bib Oberman

== Production ==
On October 2, 2015, it was announced that Trudie Styler would make her directorial debut with the young adult LGBT film Freak Show, based on the 2007 novel of same name by James St. James. Patrick J. Clifton and Beth Rigazio adapted the novel, while producers on the film would be Celine Rattray, Charlotte Ubben, and Styler through Maven Pictures along with Drew Barrymore and Nancy Juvonen's Flower Films, and Jeffrey Coulter and Bryan Rabin.

Principal photography began on October 27, 2015, in New York City. Dan Romer composed the film's score.

== Release ==
Freak Show had its world premiere at the 67th Berlin International Film Festival on February 13, 2017. Shortly afterwards, IFC Films acquired U.S. distribution rights to the film. It was released in theaters and on video on demand in the United States on January 12, 2018.

== Reception ==
On the review aggregator website Rotten Tomatoes, the film holds an approval rating of 54% based on 41 reviews, with an average rating of 5.7/10. The website's critics consensus reads, "Freak Show relies on engaging performances and obviously good intentions to cover for its clichéd story and uneven direction – and for some viewers, it may well be enough." Metacritic, which uses a weighted average, assigned the film a score of 54 out of 100, based on 10 critics, indicating "mixed or average" reviews.

Guy Lodge of Variety stated, "Trudie Styler's sparkly but superficial directorial debut is a gay coming-of-age tale that presumes more love for its fabulous hero than it earns."
