= Maven Screen Media =

- Formerly: Maven Pictures
- Industry: Motion picture
- Founded: May 2011
- Founder: Trudie Styler; Celine Rattray
- Headquarters: New York, United States
- Services: Film production
- Website: www.mavenscreenmedia.com

Maven Screen Media is an American film production company founded by Trudie Styler and Celine Rattray as Maven Pictures in 2011. It is based in New York City.

== Collaborations and deals ==
In February 2016, it was announced that Freckle Films has linked a first look overhead deal with Maven Pictures. Maven will provide development funds and cover overhead costs to acquire IP for Freckle and Maven to jointly produce. In July 2020, it was announced that Maven Pictures had been renamed Maven Screen Media. In August 2020, the company received an investment from the UK Creative Content EIS Fund, as it looks to focus more on UK film, television and digital projects.

== Filmography ==
- Girl Most Likely (2012)
- Filth (2013)
- Black Nativity (2013)
- 10,000 Saints (2015)
- American Honey (2016)
- Novitiate (2017)
- Freak Show (2017)
- Kings (2017)
- Wildling (2018)
- Boarding School (2018)
- Human Capital (2019)
- Driveways (2019)
- A Mouthful of Air (2021)
- Silent Night (2021)
- With/In (2021)
- Infinite Storm (2022)
- Golda (2022)
- Unicorns (2023)
- Up Against It (2026)

== Upcoming projects ==
Maven is in development of Courting Danger starring Olivia Cooke as Alice Marble, and Secret Life of Dr. James Miranda Barry starring Rachel Weisz as James Miranda Barry. Maven and Freckle Films have optioned The Magician’s Lie by Greer Macallister and Life and Other Near-Death Experiences by Camille Pagan.
