= Kings (2017 film) =

- Directed by: Deniz Gamze Ergüven
- Written by: Deniz Gamze Ergüven
- Produced by: Charles Gillibert; Vincent Maraval
- Starring: Halle Berry; Daniel Craig
- Cinematography: David Chizallet
- Edited by: Mathilde Van de Moortel
- Music by: Nick Cave; Warren Ellis
- Production companies: Bliss Media; CG Cinéma; Maven Pictures
- Distributed by: The Orchard
- Release dates: 13 September 2017 (TIFF); 27 April 2018 (US)
- Running time: 92 minutes
- Countries: France; Belgium; United States
- Language: English
- Box office: $910,269

Kings is a 2017 English-language drama film written and directed by Deniz Gamze Ergüven. The film stars Halle Berry and Daniel Craig.

The film had its world premiere at the 2017 Toronto International Film Festival on September 13, 2017. The film was screened during three days as part of Stockholm's International Film Festival held in November 2017. The film was screened at the Torino Film Festival in Italy before opening wide by Spring 2018.

== Plot ==
Millie Dunbar is a single mother with eight adopted children in South Los Angeles. Her neighbour, Obie, is the only white man in the neighborhood. Together they form an unlikely team during the Rodney King riots.

== Cast ==
- Halle Berry as Millie Dunbar
- Daniel Craig as Obie Hardison, Millie's neighbor and love interest
- Lamar Johnson as Jesse Cooper Dunbar, Millie's adoptive first son
- Kaalan "KR" Walker as William McGee, Jesse's best friend
- Rachel Hilson as Nicole Patterson, Jesse's love interest
- Issac Ryan Brown as Shawnte Dunbar, Millie's adoptive second son
- Callan Farris as Ruben Dunbar, Millie's adoptive third son
- Serenity Reign Brown as Peaches Dunbar, Millie's adoptive first daughter
- Reece Cody as Tiger Dunbar, Millie's adoptive fourth son
- Gary Yavuz Perreau as Carter Dunbar, Millie's adoptive fifth son
- Aiden Akpan as Jordan Dunbar, Millie's adoptive sixth son
- Ce'Onna Johnson as Sherridanne Dunbar, Millie's adoptive second daughter
- Kirk Baltz as Police Officer #1
- Kevin Carroll as Manager
- Peter Mackenzie as Police Officer #2
- David Pasquesi as Howard
- Aries Spears as Keith

Quartay Denaya played Latasha Harlins, while an uncredited Rick Ravanello played Officer Camello.

== Production ==
Ergüven started working on the film when she graduated from La Fémis film school in 2006. It took her three years to write the script as she frequented South Los Angeles for research. In 2011, she was invited to the Cinéfondation workshop at the Cannes Film Festival, where she met Alice Winocour. After struggling to find producers and financiers for the project, she went on instead to write with Winocour and direct Mustang, which was released in 2015 and was nominated for the Academy Award for Best Foreign Language Film. The success of Mustang finally allowed her to make the film.

Principal photography began on December 27, 2016 in Los Angeles. Filming lasted until mid February 2017.

== Reception ==
On review aggregator website Rotten Tomatoes, the film has an approval rating of 10% based on 39 reviews, and an average rating of 3.53/10. The website's critical consensus reads, "Kings has good intentions, a talented cast, and the basis for an incredible fact-based story; unfortunately, they don't amount to much more than a missed opportunity." On Metacritic, the film has a weighted average score of 34 out of 100, based on 16 critics, indicating "generally unfavorable" reviews.

== See also ==
- List of hood films
