= The Winning Season =

- Theatrical release poster
- Directed by: James C. Strouse
- Written by: James C. Strouse
- Produced by: Gia Walsh; Kara Baker; Daniela Taplin Lundberg; Celine Rattray; Galt Niederhoffer
- Starring: Sam Rockwell; Emma Roberts; Rob Corddry
- Cinematography: Frank G. DeMarco
- Edited by: Joe Klotz
- Music by: Edward Shearmur
- Production companies: Gigi Films; Plum Pictures
- Distributed by: Lionsgate
- Release dates: January 19, 2009 (Sundance); September 3, 2010 (United States)
- Running time: 104 minutes
- Country: United States
- Language: English

The Winning Season is a 2009 American sports comedy film written and directed by James C. Strouse, and starring Sam Rockwell, Emma Roberts and Rob Corddry. It premiered at the 2009 Sundance Film Festival and received a limited theatrical release on September 3, 2010. The film was distributed by Lionsgate in both the United States and the United Kingdom, after the company acquired the rights at Sundance. It was produced by Plum Pictures and Gigi Films.

== Plot ==
Bill Greaves, a divorced and estranged father, is struggling to reconnect with his teenage daughter, Molly. His friend Terry, a high school principal, offers him a job as the coach of the girls' varsity basketball team. Initially reluctant, Bill regrets accepting the position after meeting the team, which includes Abbie Miller, Tamra Schemerhorn, Mindy, Wendy Webber, Lisa Robinson, and Kathy Reyes. However, as the season progresses, the team improves under his guidance, and the girls help Bill reflect on and attempt to repair his relationship with Molly. Despite their success on the court, the players continue to face personal challenges off the court that their "winning season" cannot resolve.

== Cast ==
- Sam Rockwell as Bill Greaves
- Emma Roberts as Abbie Miller
- Rob Corddry as Terry
- Emily Rios as Kathy Reyes
- Rooney Mara as Wendy Webber
- Jessica Hecht as Stacey
- Connor Paolo as Damon
- Shana Dowdeswell as Molly Greaves
- Devin Ratray as Buzz
- Shareeka Epps as Lisa Robinson
- Margo Martindale as Donna
- Meaghan Witri as Tamra Schemerhorn
- Melanie Hinkle as Mindy
- Caitlin Colford as Trish
- E.J. Carroll as male announcer

== Production ==
Filming took place in New York City from October 6 to November 6, 2008. Several scenes were filmed at Cardinal Spellman High School in the Bronx.

== Reception ==
On the review aggregator website Rotten Tomatoes, The Winning Season holds a 52% approval rating based on 23 reviews.

== See also ==
- List of basketball films
