= Sooo Many White Guys =

Interview podcast

- Language: American English

Cast and voices
- Hosted by: Phoebe Robinson

Publication
- Original release: 2016 – 2019

Related
- Website: www.wnycstudios.org/podcasts/whiteguys

Sooo Many White Guys is a podcast hosted by Phoebe Robinson. It is produced by WNYC Studios. As a response to the predominance of white males in comedy, the podcast features guests who are mostly non-white, non-males. The podcast hosts women, people of color, and members of the LGBTQ community. The podcast's guests include Lizzo, podcast executive producer Ilana Glazer, Janet Mock, Hari Kondabolu, Nia Long, Gina Rodriguez, Hasan Minhaj, Roxane Gay, and Constance Wu.

The podcast debuted on June 27, 2016. It is a spin-off of WNYC's 2 Dope Queens comedy podcast featuring Robinson and Jessica Williams.

== Format ==
Sooo Many White Guys is taped at WNYC studios in New York City. Each podcast typically runs between 30 and 45 minutes. Each episode features interviews with an individual from either the music, comedy, and LGBTQ, or acting industries. Issues discussed on the podcast include race, and feminism.

Host Phoebe Robinson says of the podcast, "I figured it might be cool to change it to a talk show and just get to talk to women, people of color, people from the LGBTQ+ community that I think are really fascinating and awesome and that just aren't highlighted as much. And then that way I could focus on them and just kind of turn the whole interview process on its head and, you know, have one token white guy — obviously, a person I still respect, but just flipping the ratio."
