= E. J. Carroll (disambiguation) =

Edward John Carroll, better known as E. J. Carroll (1874–1931) was an Australian theatre and film businessman.

E. J. Carroll may also refer to:

- E.J. Carroll (actor) (1960–2026), American actor
- E. Jean Carroll (born 1943), American journalist
