= Birds of America (film) =

- Theatrical release poster
- Directed by: Craig Lucas
- Written by: Elyse Friedman
- Produced by: Daniela Taplin Lundberg; Jana Edelbaum; Celine Rattray; Galt Niederhoffer
- Starring: Matthew Perry; Ben Foster; Ginnifer Goodwin; Lauren Graham
- Cinematography: Yaron Orbach
- Edited by: Eric Kissack
- Music by: Ahrin Mishan
- Production companies: Plum Pictures iDeal Partners Film Fund
- Distributed by: Myriad Pictures (international)
- Release date: January 24, 2008 (Sundance Film Festival)
- Running time: 85 minutes
- Country: United States
- Language: English
- Box office: $150,278

Birds of America (originally titled The Laws of Motion) is a 2008 American comedy-drama independent movie directed by Craig Lucas, written by Elyse Friedman, and starring Matthew Perry. The film premiered at the 2008 Sundance Film Festival on January 24, 2008, It was produced by Plum Pictures.

== Premise ==
All Morrie's wife wants is to start a family. But when Morrie's two siblings show up needing a place to stay will they be able to juggle the pressure, or will it all be too much?

== Cast ==
- Matthew Perry as Morrie Tanager, an uptight middle-class man who has to deal with his reckless siblings
- Ben Foster as Jay Tanager, Morrie's younger brother who is prone to antisocial experiments
- Ginnifer Goodwin as Ida Tanager, Morrie's younger sister who is a "promiscuous, broke, itinerant artist"
- Lauren Graham as Betty Tanager, Morrie's wife
- Gary Wilmes as Paul, Morrie's and Betty's neighbor as well as a tenured professor at Morrie's school.
- Hilary Swank as Laura, Paul's wife
- Zoë Kravitz as Gillian Tanager, Jay's wife.
- Daniel Eric Gold as Gary, Ida's former boyfriend and Paul's brother.

== Production ==
The film was shot primarily in Darien, Connecticut.
