= The Romantics (film) =

- Directed by: Galt Niederhoffer
- Written by: Galt Niederhoffer
- Produced by: Michael Benaroya; Daniel Hendler; Daniela Taplin Lundberg; Galt Niederhoffer; Ron Stein; Jennifer Todd; Suzanne Todd
- Starring: Katie Holmes; Josh Duhamel; Anna Paquin; Malin Åkerman; Adam Brody; Dianna Agron; Jeremy Strong; Rebecca Lawrence; Candice Bergen; Elijah Wood
- Cinematography: Sam Levy
- Edited by: Jacob Craycroft
- Music by: Jonathan Sadoff
- Distributed by: Paramount Famous Productions
- Release dates: January 24, 2010 (Sundance); September 10, 2010 (United States)
- Running time: 95 minutes
- Country: United States
- Language: English
- Budget: $4.5 million
- Box office: $123,820

The Romantics is a 2010 American romantic comedy film based on the novel of the same name by Galt Niederhoffer, who also wrote the screenplay and directed the film.

== Plot ==
A group of seven college friends, who called themselves The Romantics (because of a shared interest in the Romantic Era), reunite after six years when two of them, Lila and Tom, are planning to marry. Before he got involved with Lila, Tom was in a serious relationship with Laura (the two relationships overlapped). Laura is the maid of honor at the wedding and has a hard time disguising her emotional upset and disappointment over how things worked out.

While the other friends joke, amiably bicker, and erotically cavort, Lila and Tom deal with their uncertainties over the impending nuptials, while Laura, much more restrained and buttoned down than the others, tries to talk Tom out of going through with it. The night before the wedding, they have an intense conversation, where he tells her that their romance was emotionally exhausting for him, with too many highs and lows. She believes he's betraying his ideals, but it's not clear he ever had any. Later, they have sex.

The next morning, Laura tells Lila what happened, claiming she wants to save her friend from a bad marriage. Lila understandably insists Laura did what she did out of jealousy, and is simply trying to break her and Tom up. She still has every intention of going through with the wedding, in spite of her own doubts.

During the exchange of vows at the outdoor service, held by the ocean, Tom enters into a rambling improvised monologue about how he has nothing to say. Then a thunderstorm hits, and everyone runs back to the house laughing, except for him and Laura, who smile at each other over the humor of the situation. It is unclear whether or not the wedding will proceed.

== Cast ==
- Katie Holmes as Laura Rosen
- Anna Paquin as Lila Hayes
- Josh Duhamel as Tom McDevon
- Dianna Agron as Minnow Hayes
- Adam Brody as Jake
- Malin Åkerman as Tripler
- Elijah Wood as Chip Hayes
- Rebecca Lawrence as Weesie
- Jeremy Strong as Pete
- Annabel Brooks as Sky Rosen
- Candice Bergen as Augusta Hayes
- James K. Schaffer as William Hayes
- Rosemary Murphy as Grandmother Hayes
- Warren F. McKnight as Reverend Bartlett

== Production ==
Liv Tyler was originally cast as Laura, but was replaced by Katie Holmes, who also served as the film's executive producer.

Filming took place from November to December 2009 in Southold, New York, and Los Angeles, California.

It had its world premiere during the 2010 Sundance Film Festival. It was released in selected theaters on September 10, 2010.

== Reception ==
=== Critical response ===
On Rotten Tomatoes, the film has an approval rating of 14% based on reviews from 35 critics, with an average of 4.40/10. The website's critical consensus reads: "The Romantics is visually accomplished, but director Galt Niederhoffer's adaptation of her own novel never finds the passion on the page or offers audiences a reason to invest in these limp love affairs." On Metacritic, the film has a score of 43% based on reviews from 20 critics, indicating "mixed or average reviews".

Kirk Honeycutt of The Hollywood Reporter gave the film a mixed review: "Landing somewhere between a generational comedy and soap opera, the film is forgettable fun." Dennis Harvey of Variety wrote: "While in some ways an improvement on the book, this seriocomedy toplining Katie Holmes remains short on truly involving characters or situations, and is likely to spark unflattering comparisons to such vaguely similar, more distinctive films as "Rachel Getting Married" and "Margot at the Wedding." Peter Travers of Rolling Stone gave it 1 out of 4 and wrote: "Instead of Rachel Getting Married with an Oscar-nominated Anne Hathaway, we get Galt Niederhoffer's misbegotten, miscast snoozefest with Katie Holmes struggling to prove that there is life as an actress while still being Mrs. Tom Cruise."
