= Choose (film) =

- Directed by: Marcus Graves
- Written by: Brandon Camp, Mike Thompson
- Starring: Katheryn Winnick; Kevin Pollak; Nicholas Tucci
- Release dates: January 17, 2011 (United Kingdom); March 16, 2011 (United States)
- Running time: 83 minutes
- Country: United States
- Language: English

Choose is a crime horror film directed by Marcus Graves. The film premiered at the Halloween All-Nighter FrightFest film festival on 30 October 2011. Filming took place in New York City.

== Plot ==
Fiona Wagner is studying for a master's degree in Journalism and still grieves for her mother Samantha who committed suicide 3 years ago. Her father, Detective Tom Wagner, is investigating the brutal death of lawyer Elliot Vincent, by the hands of his teenage daughter. His daughter was forced to choose between killing him or having her mother, younger brother and herself killed by a sadistic criminal who broke into their home. When pianist Simon Campbell is forced to choose between losing his fingers or his hearing, Tom realizes a deranged serial-killer is out on a rampage. Meanwhile, Fiona is contacted by the killer using the code name ISO_17 and thus unleashes many unanswered mysteries.

== Cast ==
- Katheryn Winnick as Fiona Wagner
- Kevin Pollak as Sheriff Tom Wagner
- Nicholas Tucci as Scar Lip
- Bruce Dern as Dr. Ronald Pendleton
- Richard Short as Detective Benson
- Alexi Wasser as Marni
- Lenny von Dohlen as Creepy guy in hotel
- Cady Huffman as Alice
- Billy Kay as Brian
- James Riordan as David
- Billy Magnussen as Paul
- Tom Cleary as Simon
- Shana Dowdeswell as Sara
- John Rothman as Elliot Vincent
- Cathy Ladman as Sara's Mom
- David Iacono as Jake
- Adrian Martinez as Actor
- Deborah Twiss as Terri Connelley
