= 2 Dope Queens =

Comedy podcast

- Genre: Comedy podcast
- Running time: ca. 55 min.
- Country of origin: United States
- Language: English
- Home station: WNYC Studios
- Hosted by: Jessica Williams; Phoebe Robinson
- Created by: WNYC Studios
- Produced by: Joanna Solotaroff
- Recording studio: New York City
- Original release: October 6, 2015 – November 15, 2018
- No. of episodes: 49 episodes (plus 20 bonus episodes)
- Podcast: Podcast Index

2 Dope Queens was a podcast hosted by Jessica Williams and Phoebe Robinson that aired between April 4, 2016, and November 14, 2018.

For the first seven days following the podcast's launch, it was number one on the iTunes podcast charts. It is produced by WNYC Studios. The podcast features female comedians, comedians of color, and LGBT comedians, in an effort to represent people from different backgrounds. The podcast's guests include Jon Hamm, Nick Kroll, LeVar Burton, Naomi Ekperigin, Nore Davis, Aparna Nancherla, Marc Maron, and Michelle Buteau. 2 Dope Queens is WNYC Studios' first comedy podcast.

On June 27, 2016, Sooo Many White Guys, the first 2 Dope Queens spin-off, debuted. The podcast is hosted by Phoebe Robinson and produced by Ilana Glazer.

A four-episode HBO special based on the show aired in February and March 2018 directed by podcast guest Tig Notaro. A second four-episode season aired in 2019.

== Format ==
2 Dope Queens is taped live at Union Hall in Brooklyn. Though the live show runs about two hours, the podcast is edited down to about an hour.

Each episode features three guest comedians. Issues discussed on the podcast include "race, gender, sex, and other topics".

Host Jessica Williams said of the podcast, "For our show, people get to be the stars of their own stories and they get to be the stars of their own stand up, so it's really cool to give our friends and a lot of people of color and different orientations an opportunity to speak for themselves and be sort of the main character as opposed to like the side character or supporting character."

== History ==
2 Dope Queens stemmed from Blaria LIVE!, a monthly stand-up show in Brooklyn, hosted by Phoebe Robinson and Jessica Williams. Blaria LIVE! was inspired by the blog of the same name authored by Phoebe Robinson. Similarly to 2 Dope Queens, Blaria LIVE! featured diverse comedians from all over the United States.

The 2 Dope Queens podcast debuted on April 4, 2016. In its first week, it was number one on the iTunes podcast charts and stayed there for a full week.

On July 19, 2016, Sooo Many White Guys, the first 2 Dope Queens spin-off debuted. Sooo Many White Guys is an interview-talk show hosted by Phoebe Robinson and produced by Ilana Glazer with guests including Nia Long, Janet Mock, Hari Kondabolu, Gina Rodriguez, Roxane Gay, and Hasan Minhaj.

The podcast inspired two seasons of an HBO limited series, also titled 2 Dope Queens.

After taking a break from the podcast to film for HBO, a final episode was published where the two hosts interviewed Michelle Obama and announced the ending of the show.

=== Awards ===
Award	Date	Category	Result	Ref.
Discover Pods Awards	2017	Best Comedy Podcast	Runner-up	
Shorty Awards	2017	Podcast	Nominated	
Webby Awards	2017	Comedy Podcasts	Nominated	
Webby Awards	2018	Social Humor	Nominated	
Webby Awards	2018	People's Voice Winner for Comedy Podcasts	Won	
iHeartRadio Podcast Awards	2019	Best Multicultural Podcast	Nominated	
iHeartRadio Podcast Awards	2019	Best Comedy Podcast	Nominated	

== Episodes (HBO series) ==
Season	Episodes	Originally released	
Season	Episodes	First released	Last released
1	4	February 2, 2018	February 23, 2018
2	4	February 8, 2019	March 1, 2019

=== Season 1 (2018) ===
No. overall	No. in season	Title	Directed by	Guest Star	Original release date	Prod. code	U.S. viewers (millions)
1	1	"New York"	Tig Notaro	Jon Stewart	February 2, 2018	101	N/A
2	2	"Hair"	Tig Notaro	Sarah Jessica Parker	February 9, 2018	102	N/A
3	3	"Hot Peen"	Tig Notaro	Tituss Burgess	February 16, 2018	103	N/A
4	4	"Black Nerds (aka Blerds)"	Tig Notaro	Uzo Aduba	February 23, 2018	104	N/A

=== Season 2 (2019) ===
No. overall	No. in season	Title	Directed by	Guest Star	Original release date	Prod. code	U.S. viewers (millions)
5	1	"Fashion"	Sandra Restrepo	Lupita Nyong'o	February 8, 2019	201	N/A
6	2	"Nostalgia"	Sandra Restrepo	Daniel Radcliffe	February 15, 2019	202	N/A
7	3	"Music"	Sandra Restrepo	Janet Mock & Lizzo	February 22, 2019	203	N/A
8	4	"Regal AF"	Sandra Restrepo	Keegan-Michael Key	March 1, 2019	204	N/A
