= James C. Strouse =

American screenwriter and film director

- Born: February 14, 1977 (age 49); Goshen, Indiana, U.S.
- Education: Columbia University
- Occupations: Film director; Writer

James C. Strouse is an American screenwriter and film director. He wrote and made his directorial debut with Grace Is Gone (2007), starring John Cusack.

== Career ==
He wrote the film Lonesome Jim (2005), directed by Steve Buscemi. He wrote and made his directorial debut with Grace Is Gone (2007) starring John Cusack. Strouse won an Audience Award for most popular dramatic feature and the Waldo Salt Screenwriting Award at the 2007 Sundance Film Festival for the film. He next wrote and directed the film The Winning Season (2009), starring Sam Rockwell and Emma Roberts. Strouse is a native of Goshen, Indiana and was an MFA student at Columbia University for fiction writing. His film People Places Things was released in 2015. He wrote and directed The Incredible Jessica James (2017).

He wrote and directed Love Again, an English-language remake of the 2016 German hit film SMS für Dich, starring Priyanka Chopra, Sam Heughan and Celine Dion. It was released on May 5, 2023.

== Filmography ==
Year	Title	Credited as		Notes
Year	Title	Director	Writer	Notes
2005	Lonesome Jim	No	Yes	
2007	Grace Is Gone	Yes	Yes	
2009	New York, I Love You	No	Yes	
2009	The Winning Season	Yes	Yes	
2015	People Places Things	Yes	Yes	
2016	The Hollars	No	Yes	Also executive producer
2017	Strangers	No	Yes	TV series; 6 episodes
2017	The Incredible Jessica James	Yes	Yes	
2023	Love Again	Yes	Yes	
