= Everybody's Fine (2009 film) =

2009 film by Kirk Jones

- Theatrical release poster
- Directed by: Kirk Jones
- Written by: Kirk Jones
- Based on: Everybody's Fine by Giuseppe Tornatore
- Produced by: Gianni Nunnari; Ted Field; Vittorio Cecchi Gori; Glynis Murray
- Starring: Robert De Niro; Drew Barrymore; Kate Beckinsale; Sam Rockwell
- Cinematography: Henry Braham
- Edited by: Andrew Mondshein
- Music by: Dario Marianelli
- Production companies: Radar Pictures; Hollywood Gang
- Distributed by: Miramax Films
- Release date: December 4, 2009
- Running time: 99 minutes
- Country: United States
- Language: English
- Budget: $20-21 million
- Box office: $16.4 million

Everybody's Fine is a 2009 American drama film written and directed by Kirk Jones, and starring Robert De Niro, Drew Barrymore, Sam Rockwell and Kate Beckinsale. It is a remake of Giuseppe Tornatore's Italian film Everybody's Fine. In Brazil, Russia and Japan, the film was released direct-to-DVD.

== Plot ==
Frank Goode, a recently widowed retiree whose career was making telephone cables, is getting ready for his children to visit him. They call to cancel at the last minute, so he decides to visit them instead.

Despite warnings from his doctor, Frank takes a train to New York City to see the first of his children, an artist named David, but he is not home. His next visit is to daughter Amy in Chicago, who lives in an impressive suburban home with her husband Jeff and son Jack. The atmosphere is uncomfortable, and Amy tells him that it is a bad time to visit. The next morning, Amy takes Frank to the train station, where he buys a ticket to visit his son Robert in Denver.

Frank arrives in Denver expecting to see Robert conducting the city's orchestra, but it turns out that Robert is merely a percussionist. Robert also tells Frank that his visit is at a bad time because the orchestra is flying to Europe the following day. Frank prepares to take a bus to Las Vegas to visit his daughter Rosie, but misses it after not adjusting his watch to account for the time zone. Frank catches a ride part of the way from a female truck driver. In the train station, Frank offers money to a drug addict who attempts to rob him; Frank loses his medicine during the encounter. On the train ride to Las Vegas, he has a dream that David is in trouble.

In Las Vegas, Rosie meets Frank in a stretch limo. She tells him that she had just performed in a big show, but he cannot attend it because it ended the previous week. Rosie takes him to her apartment with plans of having dinner at the Stratosphere, but the latter is called off when her friend Jilly brings her baby for babysitting. Frank learns that the apartment is actually not Rosie's. During dinner, he asks Rosie why his children did not talk intimately with him while they were so open with their mother. She reveals that he always expected too much of them, and that he was not a good listener.

Frank flies home but has a heart attack without his medication. He has another dream of his kids as children that reveals their secrets: Amy is separated from her husband, Robert lied about going to Europe, and Rosie is really bisexual and the mother of Jilly's child. Frank awakens in the hospital, where he learns that David died from an overdose. That night, Frank has another dream in which David appears and urges him not to feel guilty for his shortcomings.

After recovering, Frank visits his wife's grave and talks about pushing the kids too much and not trying to understand them more. Still, he tells her that everybody is fine. Frank returns to New York and buys a painting by David—a landscape that shows unconnected telephone lines.

At Christmas, the three remaining children are around the house helping to cook and decorate the tree. Jack, Jilly, and Rosie's children are also present to help. They sit and eat their meal, with David's painting visible in the background.

== Cast ==
- Robert De Niro as Frank Goode
- Drew Barrymore as Rosie Goode
  - Mackenzie Milone as Young Rosie
- Kate Beckinsale as Amy Goode
  - Lily Mo Sheen as Young Amy
- Sam Rockwell as Robert Goode
  - Seamus Davey-Fitzpatrick as Young Robert
- Austin Lysy as David Goode
  - Chandler Frantz as Young David
- Katherine Moennig as Jilly, Rosie's partner
- Melissa Leo as Colleen, truck driver
- Lucian Maisel as Jack, Amy's son
- Damian Young as Jeff, Amy's husband
- James Frain as Tom, Amy's current partner
- Ben Schwartz as Amy's coworker
- Sonja Stuart as Jean Goode
  - Mimi Lieber provides Jean Goode's voice
- Brendan Sexton III as mugger
- Kene Holliday as butcher
- E.J. Carroll as wine man

== Production ==
Filming took place in Connecticut and New York City, including several scenes filmed at Yale University in New Haven, Connecticut. Scenes set in a concert hall were filmed at Yale University's Woolsey Hall and feature the New Haven Symphony Orchestra. Train and bus station scenes were filmed at Union Station (New Haven).

== Reception ==
=== Box office ===
The film "unspooled in 10th [place] with $4 million". As of December 6, 2009, the film had grossed $4,027,000. It closed on December 24, 2009, after a brief three-week run. It ended up making $16,443,609 worldwide, making it a box-office flop.

=== Critical reaction ===
The film received mixed reviews from film critics. Review aggregator Rotten Tomatoes gives the film a score of 47%, based on reviews from 138 critics, with an average rating of 5.4/10. The website's critical consensus reads, "A calm, charismatic performance from Robert De Niro nearly saves the movie, but ultimately, Everybody's Fine has the look and feel of a stereotypical Christmas dramedy." On Metacritic, which assigns a weighted average score out of 100 to reviews from film critics, the film has a rating score of 47 based on 25 reviews, indicating "mixed or average" reviews.

Michael Medved gave Everybody's Fine two stars out of four, calling the film "...bleak, deeply depressive, and utterly depressing..." But he also added that "DeNiro's acting is intense and moving as always".

The critical consensus praises Robert De Niro for having "intensity and presence that shines through even when he's not playing Travis Bickle/Jake LaMotta types, "but the movie becomes overly sentimental, and the supporting players aren't given three-dimensional characters to play".

=== Awards ===
Everybody's Fine was nominated for a GLAAD Media Award for Outstanding Film – Wide Release. Drew Barrymore also received the Vanguard Award at the 21st GLAAD Media Awards ceremony, due in part to her performance in the film.

== Soundtrack ==
Paul McCartney wrote the ballad "(I Want to) Come Home" for the film after seeing an advance screening. Although he wrote the song from the perspective of De Niro's character, he realized afterward that it can also be heard from the adult children's view. The recording earned a Golden Globe nomination for Best Song.

== Home media ==
Everybody's Fine was released on DVD by Walt Disney Studios Home Entertainment on February 23, 2010. A Blu-ray was released in 2012 via Lionsgate.
