= Lonesome Jim =

2005 film by Steve Buscemi

- DVD cover
- Directed by: Steve Buscemi
- Written by: James C. Strouse
- Produced by: Jake Abraham; Galt Niederhoffer; Celine Rattray; Daniela Taplin Lundberg; Gary Winick
- Starring: Casey Affleck; Liv Tyler; Kevin Corrigan; Mary Kay Place; Seymour Cassel; Mark Boone Junior
- Cinematography: Phil Parmet
- Edited by: Plummy Tucker
- Music by: Evan Lurie
- Production companies: Plum Pictures; InDigEnt
- Distributed by: IFC Films (United States); Lions Gate Entertainment (International)
- Release date: January 22, 2005 (Sundance Film Festival)
- Running time: 91 minutes
- Country: United States
- Language: English
- Budget: $500,000
- Box office: $174,815

Lonesome Jim is a 2005 American comedy drama film directed by Steve Buscemi and written by James C. Strouse, based partly upon events from his life. Filmed mostly in the city of Goshen, Indiana, the film stars Casey Affleck as a chronically depressed aspiring writer who moves back into his parents' home after failing to make it in New York City. The film premiered at the 2005 Sundance Film Festival, where it was nominated for the Grand Jury Prize, which it lost to Ira Sachs' Forty Shades of Blue.

== Plot ==
Jim is a perennially gloomy 27-year-old aspiring writer from Goshen, Indiana who had moved to NYC in hopes of finding success with his writing. After two years of barely making a living as a dog walker, he decides to move back home to his parents' house in Goshen.

Jim's 32-year-old brother Tim, a recently divorced father of two young girls whose business recently failed, has moved back into his parents' home. He works in the ladder factory that's owned and operated by their father Don and cheerful mother Sally. Jim has no interest in the family business and he resists pressure to start working there.

Jim meets Anika, a nurse, in a bar and they end up having sex in a hospital bed, and Jim finishes almost immediately.

After a conversation between the two brothers on whose life is more pathetic, Tim, having previously made repeated suicide attempts, drives his car into a tree. He is gravely injured, in a coma, and hospitalized. Jim finally gives in to Don and works in the factory by taking over Tim's duties. He also takes over Tim's job as the coach of a girls basketball team. The team, which has not scored a single point in the last 14 games, includes both of Tim's daughters.

While visiting Tim is in the hospital, Jim runs into Anika, who works in pediatrics. They arrange a date, but on arriving to pick her up, he discovers she is a single mother. Their relationship progresses, however. Anika is sympathetic to Jim's problems, and she decides to stand by him even when he tries to convince her that it's in her best interest to not be around him.

At the ladder factory, Jim encounters his uncle Stacy, who prefers the nickname "Evil." Over a joint, Evil offers advice about premature ejaculation, and they become better acquainted. He offers Jim recreational drugs and asks him to open him a checking account so he can pay for things by mail. Evil gives Jim $4,000, saying it is saved-up birthday, Christmas and graduation presents.

Jim's mother, Sally, is arrested by DEA officers for allegedly shipping illegal drugs through the store's FedEx account. Evil is the drug dealer, but Jim cannot get him to confess. Evil points out that Jim will be implicated if he tries to report him, as he has opened an account with his cash and will test positive for drug use. An eternal optimist, Sally makes friends with her fellow prisoners and accepts a novel from Jim when he visits. Eventually she is released on bail.

Despite working at the factory and feeling responsible for his mother's imprisonment, Jim allows Anika to soften his depression and starts believing that life is worth living. He invites her and her son to move with him to New Orleans, but after Jim gets cold feet and makes a questionable decision, the move seems to be off the table.

Jim finally leaves for New Orleans alone, leaving a note for his parents promising not to take their love for granted again and revealing Evil as the drug dealer. Anika shows up at the bus station to say goodbye. Jim departs on the bus, but as Anika drives home with her son, he runs after them, luggage in hand. He asks "for a ride" and the movie ends with Jim, out-of-breath, finally getting a bottle of water from Ben in the back seat.

== Cast ==
- Casey Affleck as Jim
- Liv Tyler as Anika
- Kevin Corrigan as Tim
- Mary Kay Place as Sally
- Seymour Cassel as Don
- Mark Boone Junior as Stacy a.k.a. "Evil"
- Jack Rovello as Ben

== Production ==
The film was originally a part of a deal between Plum Pictures and United Artists, with a proposed budget of $3 million, but the money fell through when the studio's president, Bingham Ray, unexpectedly resigned. The film was rescued by producer Gary Winick's company InDigEnt, who dictated a smaller budget of $500,000 and the use of the Panasonic AG-DVX100 MiniDV camera; the original filming schedule was subsequently reduced from 30 to 17 days. As a cost-saving measure, screenwriter James C. Strouse, a native of Goshen, Indiana, cast two of his nieces in the film and served as location manager, using his parents' home and factory as the main filming locations.

== Critical reception and box office ==
During its theatrical run, Lonesome Jim never earned back its initial budget of $500,000; instead, the film grossed less than $155,000 domestically and less than $175,000 worldwide.

The film received mixed reaction from film critics. On the review aggregator website Rotten Tomatoes, 61% of 89 critics' reviews are positive, with an average rating of 6/10. The website's consensus reads: "Though Lonesome Jim is leavened by sweet, understated humor, it's hard to root for such a morose, self-defeating protagonist." Metacritic, which uses a weighted average, assigned the film a score of 54 out of 100, based on 25 critics, indicating "mixed or average" reviews.

Film critic Roger Ebert of the Chicago Sun-Times awarded the film three stars out of four, and it also received "Two thumbs up" on the film review television program At the Movies with Ebert & Roeper co-hosted by Richard Roeper. Peter Travers of Rolling Stone awarded it three stars out of four, calling the film a "deadpan delight" and proclaiming "I can't recall having a better time at a movie about depression". Critic Christopher Campbell declared the film "hilarious throughout. By far it is the funniest thing I saw during the [Sundance film] festival".

Stephen Holden of The New York Times was more negative on the film, criticizing its sense of humor by calling it "only as broad as the Mona Lisa's smile" and criticizing Affleck's portrayal of Jim. Lisa Schwarzbaum of Entertainment Weekly awarded the film a grade of C-, writing that director Steve Buscemi "is stymied here by the inertia of his material".

== See also ==
- Cinema of the United States
- List of American films of 2005
