= Wendy Kesselman =

American playwright

- Born: 1940 (age 85–86)
- Occupation: Playwright

Wendy Kesselman is an American playwright.

== Life ==
Wendy Kesselman joined the Actors Theatre of Louisville in 1980. She lives in Wellfleet, Massachusetts.

== Awards ==
She won the 1981 Susan Smith Blackburn Prize for My Sister in this House.

== Works ==
- Becca, 1977
- Maggie Magalita. Samuel French, Inc. 1987. p. 4. ISBN 978-0-573-69017-4. "Wendy Kesselman playwright.", 1980
- Merry-Go-Round, 1981
- My Sister In This House. Samuel French, Inc. 1988. ISBN 978-0-573-61872-7., 1981
- I Love You, I Love You Not, 1982
- The Juniper Tree: A Tragic Household Tale. Samuel French, Inc. 1985. ISBN 978-0-573-61113-1., 1982
- Cinderella In A Mirror, 1987
- The Griffin, And The Minor Cannon, 1988
- A Tale Of Two Cities, 1992
- The Butcher's Daughter, 1993
- Sand In My Shoes, 1995
- The Diary of Anne Frank, 1997 (adaptation)
- The Last Bridge, 2002
- The Notebook. Dramatists Play Service, Inc. 2004. ISBN 978-0-8222-1906-4.
- The Black Monk, 2008
- Olympe And The Executioner

=== Film ===
- I Love You, I Love You Not (1997)
- Sister My Sister (1994)
