= Diminished Capacity =

- Theatrical release poster
- Directed by: Terry Kinney
- Written by: Sherwood Kiraly
- Produced by: Galt Niederhoffer; Celine Rattray; Tim Evans; Daniela Tapling Lundberg
- Starring: Matthew Broderick; Virginia Madsen; Alan Alda
- Cinematography: Vanja Cernjul
- Edited by: Tim Streeto
- Music by: Robert Burger
- Release dates: January 21, 2008 (Sundance Film Festival); July 4, 2008 (United States)
- Running time: 92 minutes
- Country: United States
- Language: English
- Box office: $23,719

Diminished Capacity is a 2008 comedy film directed by Terry Kinney and written by Sherwood Kiraly, based on his novel of the same name. It stars Matthew Broderick, Virginia Madsen, and Alan Alda. It was released at the 2008 Sundance Film Festival and opened in theaters in July 2008. It was produced by Plum Pictures.

== Plot ==
A newspaper editor suffering from memory loss after an accident takes a trip to a memorabilia expo with his Alzheimer's-impaired relative, Rollie, and his high school flame, Charlotte. The plan is for Rollie to sell a rare baseball card, but a few people want the card.

== Cast ==
- Matthew Broderick as Cooper Zerbs
- Virginia Madsen as Charlotte
- Alan Alda as Rollie Zerbs, Cooper's Uncle
- Louis CK as Big Stan
- Jim True-Frost as Donny Prine
- Dylan Baker as Mad Dog McClure
- Bobby Cannavale as Lee Vivyan
- Jeff Perry as Casey Dean, Cooper's boss
- Lois Smith as Belle Zerbs, Cooper's mother
- Chris Bauer as Lloyd, Charlotte's ex
- Tom Aldredge as Wendell Kendall

== Critical reception ==
On review aggregator Rotten Tomatoes, the film holds an approval rating of 35% based on 31 reviews, with an average rating of 5.3/10. The website's critics consensus reads: "This low-key comedy about memory loss offers mild pleasures but is too bland to fully resonate." On Metacritic, the film has a weighted average score of 54 out of 100, based on 13 critics, indicating "mixed or average" reviews. USA Today said that it "has moments of sweetness, but not enough poignancy or wit to turn it into the endearing art-house comedy that it aspires to be." Time Out New York said, "Great, just what we needed: another rote exercise in indie-feely humanism."
