= Elyse Friedman =

Canadian writer

- Born: Toronto, Ontario, Canada
- Occupations: Writer, screenwriter
- Writing career
- Notable works: The Answer to Everything, Long Story Short, Then Again, Waking Beauty, Suddenly Naked, & Birds of America

Elyse Friedman (born in Toronto, Ontario, Canada) is a Canadian writer who was raised in North York, Ontario. Her latest novel, The Opportunist, released November 29, 2022.

== Education and career ==
Elyse Friedman is a graduate of the Canadian Film Centre.

== Personal life ==
Elyse Friedman lives in Toronto.

== Awards and accomplishments ==
Elyse Friedman has published four novels, one book of short stories, and a book of poems. Her work has been shortlisted for the Toronto Book Award, the Trillium Book Award and the Relit Award. Her story, The Soother, won the Gold National Magazine Award for fiction. Her stories have appeared in the Journey Prize Anthology, Best Canadian Stories and various literary journals and anthologies in Canada and the United States. Elyse's screenplay "Better Now" received the TIFF-CBC Screenwriter Award Jury Prize in 2019. In 2020, her screenplay "The Relationship Experiment" won the TIFF-CBC Screenwriter Award. She has also won a Tom Hendry Award for her play The Cole Porter Suite (RBC Emerging Playwright Award, 2019).

== Published works ==
=== Films and screenplays ===
- Suddenly Naked, 2001

A comedy about a 40-year-old novelist who falls in love with a writer who is much younger. Originally titled Show & Tell, Suddenly Naked appeared on film festival screens in places such as Toronto, Berlin, Vancouver and Hawaii. This movie earned six Genie Award nominations, including Best Picture, and won an award for best editing.

- Birds of America, 2008

In 2020, she won the TIFF-CBC Films Screenwriter Award for her screenplay The Relationship Experiment.

=== Novels and short stories ===
- Then Again, 1999

In Then Again, Friedman "Fashions characters who go to extraordinary lengths in their efforts to escape or recapture the past; as they discover the high price that accompanies the knowledge that neither of these things is possible." Then Again highlights the "limits of family loyalty and the necessity of choosing to live for oneself when the demand of others becomes intolerable." Friedman has said that she wrote this book because she "wanted to talk about the lingering effects on the children of holocaust survivors. There's a residue that remains and has an effect on children. [She] also wanted to explore the ideas of subjective memory – how different siblings can have different takes on the same environment." Then Again is a prominent book in bookstores and is published by Random House.

- Long Story Short, 2004

In Long Story Short, Friedman has put together a collection of short stories that "document the lives of six perverse and eccentric protagonists who share one common characteristic: living lives that have somehow gone off kilter" Long Story Short was published by Anansi.

- Waking Beauty, 2004
- Long Story Short, a Novella & Stories, 2007

The Answer to Everything, 2014

The Opportunist, 2022

=== Poetry ===
- Know Your Monkey, 2003
