= Jack Rovello =

American actor

- Born: Jack Rovello; January 1, 1994 (age 32); New York City
- Occupation: Actor
- Years active: 2001–Present

Jack Rovello (born January 1, 1994) is an American actor. He appeared as Richie Brown in the 2002 Academy Award-nominated film The Hours. He was nominated for an award at the Phoenix Film Critics Society Awards in 2002. He has since appeared in the Steve Buscemi-directed Lonesome Jim (2005).

== Career ==
Rovello played Richie Brown, the son of Julianne Moore's character, in the 2002 drama film The Hours. Scotland on Sunday noted that he gave a "very striking appearance... as Moore's sensitive son", while The Charleston Gazette called Rovello one of the film's two "talented, young newcomers" alongside Sophie Wyburd. For his work in the film, Rovello was nominated for Best Performance by a Youth in a Leading or Supporting Role – Male at the Phoenix Film Critics Society Awards in 2002, ultimately losing to Nicholas Hoult for the film About a Boy.

In 2005, Rovello co-starred in the Steve Buscemi-directed film Lonesome Jim with Casey Affleck and Liv Tyler. Rovello has also appeared in the American television series Days of Our Lives, Sex And The City, and One Life to Live.
