= Phoebe Robinson =

American comedian (born 1984)

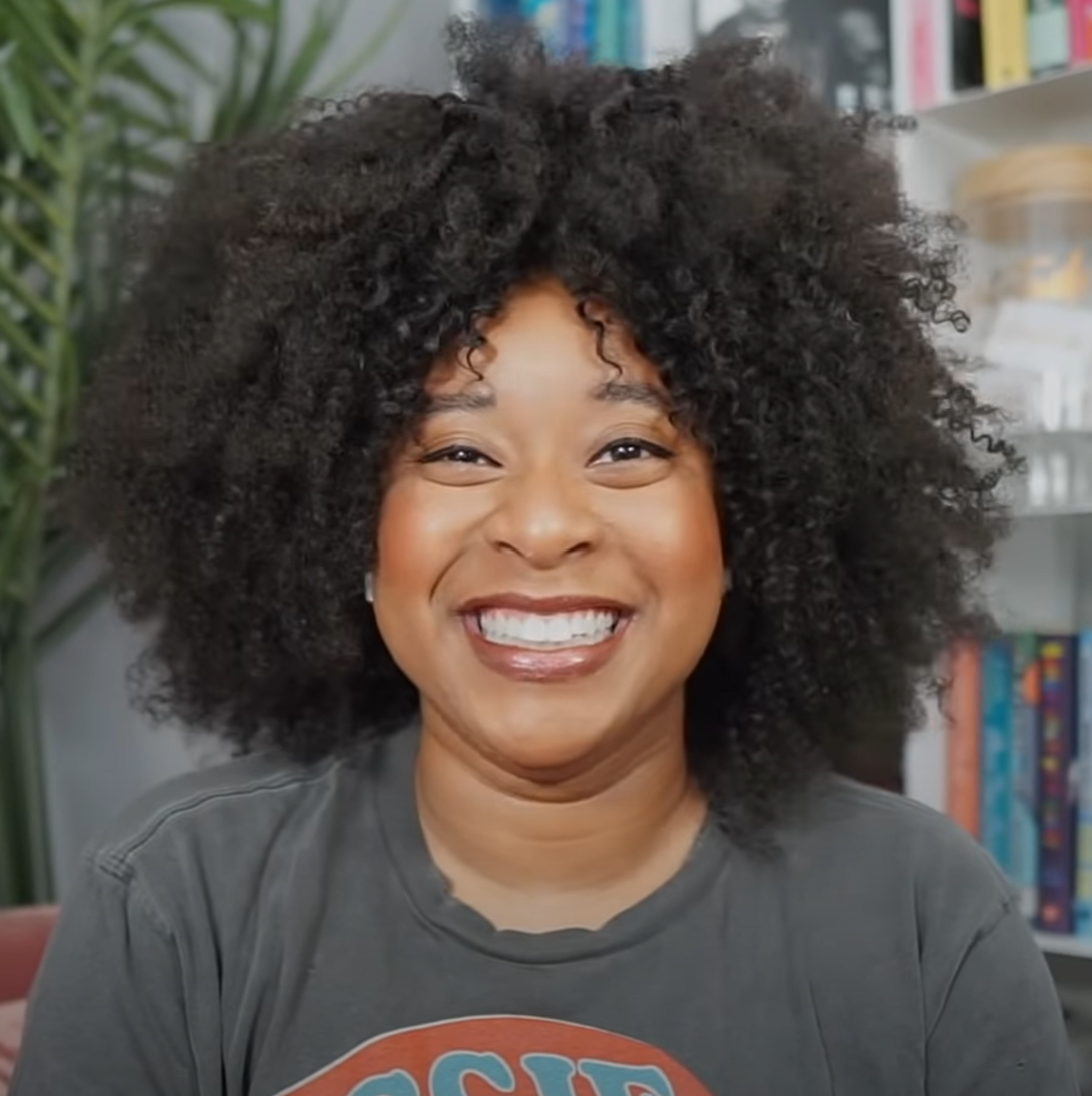
- Robinson in 2020
- Born: September 28, 1984 (age 42); Bedford, Ohio, U.S.
- Education: Pratt Institute
- Occupations: Comedian, writer, and actress
- Relatives: Phil Robinson (brother)

Comedy career
- Medium: Stand-up; television; podcast
- Genres: Race; gender; popular culture
- Website: phoeberobinson.com

Phoebe Robinson (born September 28, 1984) is an American comedian, writer, and actress based in New York City.

== Early life and education ==
Robinson grew up in Bedford Heights and Solon, Ohio. She attended high school at Gilmour Academy. Her brother, Phil Robinson, is a member of the Ohio House of Representatives. In 2002, Robinson went to college at Pratt Institute in New York City, where she studied screenwriting.

== Career ==
Robinson was a staff writer for MTV's Girl Code and a consultant on season three of Broad City. She is a regular contributor to Glamour, and has been published in The New York Times, Bitch, Vanity Fair, and many publications. Her blog, Blaria (named for "Black Daria"), has been featured in The Huffington Post, and Robinson has regularly performed a live version of Blaria Live in Brooklyn and Washington, D.C. With Jessica Williams, she is the creator and co-host of the 2 Dope Queens podcast and HBO series, and she created and starred in Refinery29's web series Woke Bae.

She has made numerous television appearances, including on NBC's Last Comic Standing, the Today show, Late Night with Seth Meyers, and Last Call with Carson Daly, Comedy Central's Broad City, @midnight, and The Nightly Show with Larry Wilmore, FX's Totally Biased with W. Kamau Bell, and VH1's Big Morning Buzz Live. She has been named by Vulture, Essence, Esquire, Flavorwire, Brooklyn Magazine, and SF Sketchfest as a comedian to watch.

Her solo podcast, Sooo Many White Guys, premiered on July 12, 2016. As a response to the predominance of white males in comedy, the podcast features women, people of color, and LGBTQ people. Ilana Glazer of Broad City serves as an executive producer. Robinson's first book, You Can't Touch My Hair (And Other Things I Still Have to Explain), debuted on October 4, 2016. Her second book, Everything's Trash, But It's Okay, was released on October 16, 2018. She had a supporting role in the 2018 comedy Ibiza.

In August 2019, it was announced that she would star in and executive produce an interview show on Comedy Central, as the first project from her production company, Tiny Reparations. Robinson's third book, Please Don't Sit on My Bed in Your Outside Clothes, was published by Tiny Reparations Books on September 28, 2021. In July 2022, Robinson's television show Everything's Trash debuted on the channel Freeform. Robinson stars as Phoebe, a podcast host facing down adulthood while her older brother (Jordan Carlos) runs for state office. Most recently, she signed a first-look deal with Sony Pictures Television.

Robinson lives and performs in Brooklyn, New York.

== Filmography ==
=== Film ===
Year	Title	Role	Notes
2017	In Case of Emergency	Charlene	
2018	Ibiza	Leah	
2019	What Men Want	Ciarra	
2020	Becoming	Herself	Documentary film

=== Television ===
Year	Title	Role	Notes
2014	Broad City	Shenae	Episode: "What a Wonderful World"
2016	Netflix Presents: The Characters	Phoebe	Episode: "Natasha Rothwell"
2016–2017	I Love Dick	Suki	7 episodes
2017	Search Party	Emily	2 episodes
2018–2019	2 Dope Queens	Herself	8 episodes; also writer
2019–2020	BoJack Horseman	Dean Squooshyface (voice)	2 episodes
2020	RuPaul's Secret Celebrity Drag Race	Herself / Contestant	Episode: "Dragzilla"
2020	Yearly Departed	Herself-Eulogist	Year-in-Review Comedy Special
2021	Doing the Most with Phoebe Robinson	Herself	10 episodes
2021	Phoebe Robinson: Sorry, Harriet Tubman	Herself	Special
2022	Everything's Trash	Phoebe	10 episodes; also creator, writer, and executive producer
2023	The Great American Baking Show: Celebrity Holiday	Herself (contestant)	Special
2023	The Wonder Years	Jackie	2 episodes
2024	Clash of the Cookbooks	Herself (co-host)	6 episodes; also executive producer
TBA	Celebrity Million Dollar Secret	Contestant	

=== Web ===
Year	Title	Role	Notes
2016	Woke Bae	Herself	6 episodes
2020	Dear Class of 2020	Herself	
2025	Phoebe Robinson: I Don't Wanna Work Anymore	Herself	Special

=== Music videos ===
Year	Title	Artist(s)	Role	Ref.
2018	"Girls Like You" (Original, Volume 2 and Vertical Video versions)	Maroon 5 featuring Cardi B	Herself (cameo)	
2018	"Crushin' It"	The Slay Team	Global Gladiator	

== Bibliography ==
- Robinson, Phoebe (2016). You Can't Touch My Hair And Other Things I Still Have to Explain. Plume. ISBN 978-0143129202.
- Robinson, Phoebe (2018). Everything's Trash, But It's Okay. Plume. ISBN 978-0525534167.
- Robinson, Phoebe (2021). Please Don't Sit on My Bed in Your Outside Clothes. Tiny Reparations Books. ISBN 978-0593184905.
