= People Places Things =

- Theatrical release poster
- Directed by: James C. Strouse
- Written by: James C. Strouse
- Produced by: Michael B. Clark; Alex Turtletaub
- Starring: Jemaine Clement; Regina Hall; Stephanie Allynne; Jessica Williams; Michael Chernus; Gia Gadsby; Aundrea Gadsby
- Cinematography: Chris Teague
- Edited by: Colleen Sharp
- Music by: Mark Orton
- Production company: Beachside
- Distributed by: The Film Arcade
- Release dates: January 26, 2015 (Sundance); August 14, 2015 (United States)
- Running time: 85 minutes
- Country: United States
- Language: English
- Box office: $67,046

People Places Things is a 2015 American comedy film written and directed by James C. Strouse. The film stars Jemaine Clement, Regina Hall, Jessica Williams, Stephanie Allynne and Michael Chernus. The film was released on August 14, 2015, by The Film Arcade.

== Plot ==
Will Henry is a graphic novelist and art instructor, adjusting decorations for the birthday party of his five-year-old twin daughters, Clio and Colette. As he searches for his longtime partner, Charlie, he walks in on her and Gary, a monologist she's having an affair with. Charlie tells him that she's not happy and is leaving him for Gary.

A year later, Will lives in a smaller place and sees his daughters on the weekends. They have a good relationship and he wants to spend more time with them, but Charlie has doubts he can handle it. She also tells him she is pregnant and marrying Gary.

Will's art student, Kat, asks him to dinner with her single mother, Diane. He finds Diane attractive and likable, but she has a low opinion of Kat's studies and Will's career. Diane tells him she is dating someone, and he leaves after dinner.

One night, Charlie abruptly drops the girls off at Will's, asking him to take care of them full-time as the nanny has quit. Though initially struggling, he soon becomes more organized. However, a bomb threat cancels their school day, and needing a babysitter while he teaches class, he asks Kat to watch them.

When Will goes to pick the girls up after class, Diane admonishes him for passing his daughters off on Kat when she needs her education, and for bouncing them around between parents. The girls are asleep, so Will has to spend the night. Diane tells him that she has gained a new respect for their passion for graphic novels. Confessing she broke up with the man she was seeing, she and Will kiss and are about to have sex, but one of the twins comes looking for him and he goes to keep them company. In the morning, Kat asks him to read her graphic novel.

Will and Diane begin a casual relationship, and things become tense between Charlie and Will; they blame each other's behavior for the girls' confusion. Charlie calls Will one night with 'an emergency'; when he rushes over she tells him that the girls have locked themselves in the bathroom, saying that they want to live with him. Distressed, she tells him that Gary has been having doubts about the wedding, because he thinks she's jealous about Will and Diane, and they kiss. The girls come out of the bathroom and they all go out for ice cream, Charlie promises Will that they'll talk about their relationship later. Then Will tells Diane about the kiss and she asks if he still has feelings for Charlie. He says that he doesn't know, and asks if the feelings ever go away. She says that they do eventually and, hurt, breaks it off with him.

Will meets Charlie and the twins in the park, clearly believing in their relationship, but she tells him that she and Gary are again ready for marriage. Furious, Will leaves, and begins drawing vengeful artwork against Gary. He stops to read Kat's graphic novel: titled "Mother Fuckers," chronicling her mother's struggles with dating as a single mother, showing Diane more disappointed and heartbroken with every breakup. Will finds Kat again, who is angry at him for hurting her mother, and he gives her his own set of drawings, of him struggling with letting go of Charlie that he had been creating throughout the film. Later, she finds him at his home, gives him back his work, telling him that she sees it is about Charlie and he needs to let her go. She also flips to a panel he'd drawn of her mother telling him she showed it to Diane, and he should call and rekindle their relationship.

On the day of Charlie's wedding to Gary, Will attends but finds Charlie absent. Gary is trying to call her, and Will confronts him, punching him (after warning him) but also telling him that he knows Gary loves Charlie. Afterwards he finds her, she is afraid of making "another mistake," but he tells her their relationship wasn't a mistake—just something that worked until it didn't. They decide to remain friends, and Charlie marries Gary. Will leaves on his own with some stolen flowers from the wedding, presumably to go visit Diane.

== Cast ==
- Jemaine Clement as Will Henry
- Regina Hall as Diane
- Jessica Williams as Kat
- Stephanie Allynne as Charlie
- Michael Chernus as Gary
- Aundrea Gadsby as Clio
- Gia Gadsby as Colette

== Release ==
The film premiered at the Sundance Film Festival on January 26, 2015. On February 24, 2015, The Film Arcade acquired distribution rights to the film. The film was released on August 14, 2015, by The Film Arcade. Artist Gray Williams, who created all of the drawings used as Clement's in the film, also created several alternate posters to mark the movie's release.

== Reception ==
People Places Things received positive reviews from critics. On Rotten Tomatoes, the film has an approval rating of 77%, based on 57 reviews, with an average rating of 6.90/10. The website's critical consensus reads, "People Places Things finds writer-director Jim Strouse in peak form — and makes the most of talented stars who help breathe fresh life into familiar narrative territory." On Metacritic, the film has a score of 68 out of 100, based on 20 critics, indicating "generally favorable reviews".
