= Grace Is Gone =

- Theatrical release poster
- Directed by: James C. Strouse
- Written by: James C. Strouse
- Produced by: John Cusack; Grace Loh; Galt Niederhoffer; Celine Rattray; Daniela Taplin Lundberg
- Starring: John Cusack; Alessandro Nivola
- Cinematography: Jean-Louis Bompoint
- Edited by: Joe Klotz
- Music by: Clint Eastwood
- Production companies: Plum Pictures; New Crime Productions
- Distributed by: The Weinstein Company
- Release dates: January 21, 2007 (Sundance); December 7, 2007 (United States)
- Running time: 85 minutes
- Country: United States
- Language: English
- Budget: $3 million
- Box office: $1.1 million

Grace Is Gone is a 2007 American drama film written and directed by James C. Strouse in his directorial debut. It stars John Cusack as a father who cannot bring himself to tell his two daughters that their mother, a soldier in the U.S. Army, has just been killed on a tour of duty in Iraq. On January 29, 2007, it won the Audience Award for Drama at the 2007 Sundance Film Festival.

The film was produced by Plum Pictures and New Crime Productions and purchased by Harvey Weinstein for distribution by The Weinstein Company. Weinstein announced plans to mount an Academy Award campaign on behalf of Cusack. It is the only film scored by Clint Eastwood that he did not direct.

== Plot ==
Stanley Phillips is a middle-aged Army veteran in Chicago caring for his two daughters, 12-year-old Heidi and 8-year-old Dawn, while his wife, Grace, serves in Iraq. One morning, two Army casualty notification officers visit his home and inform him that Grace has been killed in combat.

In shock, Stanley dreads having to tell his daughters of their mother's death. When they come home from school, he tries to take them out to dinner and tell them afterward. Unable to, he instead spontaneously decides to take them on a road trip to Enchanted Gardens, a Florida theme park that the girls have been wanting to visit.

That evening, Stanley calls their home to hear Grace's voice on their answering machine. The following morning, they arrive at the house of Stanley's mother, who is out, where they instead find his younger brother, John. Stanley encourages the three to go out to lunch. During their absence, he finally breaks down and cries himself to sleep. Upon returning, John receives a call from a family friend expressing their condolences for Grace's death. He angrily confronts his brother, demanding to know why he hasn't told the girls or anyone. Stanley rushes off, saying he will eventually.

The trio leave and later that day, stay at a motel. While Stanley is out of the room, Heidi calls her school to inform them that she and Dawn will be out for a few days. She notices her principal seems unusually sympathetic. The following afternoon at a gas station, Stanley calls their answering machine again, leaving a message saying he wished it'd been him that'd been deployed instead of Grace. Heidi asks who he was speaking to and grows suspicious after Stanley tells her he was talking to her teacher at the school.

That evening, the three arrive at Enchanted Gardens. At their hotel, Heidi calls home and hears Stanley's message to Grace, growing even more suspicious. The next day, the three spend their time at the park, having the most fun since Grace departed for Iraq. Stanley is reluctant to leave as he knows he will then have to tell them of Grace's death. He takes the girls to a nearby beach and finally informs them that Grace has died. The three embrace and mourn her as the sun sets.

Heidi writes a eulogy and reads it aloud at Grace's funeral. The film's final scene is of Stanley, Heidi and Dawn at her grave.

== Cast ==
- John Cusack as Stanley Phillips
- Alessandro Nivola as John Phillips
- Gracie Bednarczyk as Dawn Phillips
- Shélan O'Keefe as Heidi Phillips
- Dana Lynne Gilhooley as Grace Phillips
- Marisa Tomei as Woman at Pool
- Mary Kay Place as Woman at Funeral

== Production ==
In April 2005, writer and director James C. Strouse began developing the script with his wife, producer Galt Niederhoffer. Strouse wrote the role of Stanley Phillips with John Cusack in mind, and said the story was partly inspired by a trip he took with his two nieces to a theme park after his brother’s divorce. Strouse‘s agent passed the script along to producer Grace Loh, who in turn passed it along to her producing partner Cusack, who was looking for a political project to do after the Bush administration banned photos of soldiers’ coffins in the media. Said Cusack, "I said, we gotta find something that tells more of these stories about the human cost of war. Just then the script came in. It was kismet."

In May 2006, Cusack and Marisa Tomei were announced to star in the film, with Cusack also producing. Filming primarily took place in Chicago, Illinois and lasted six weeks. The Enchanted Gardens scenes were filmed at Cypress Gardens in Winter Haven, Florida.

== Release ==
The film premiered January 20, 2007, at the Sundance Film Festival, and won the Audience Award and the Waldo Salt Screenwriting Award. The Weinstein Company won a bidding war for the film, paying $4 million for the distribution rights. Harvey Weinstein commented he wanted to mount an Oscars campaign for the film, saying, "It's definitely an Oscar season awards festival October/November release. It's Cusack's turn."

The film’s score, which was originally done by Max Richter, was re-done by Clint Eastwood, who offered to compose a new score after seeing the film. Eastwood’s score was added to the film before its premiere at the New York Film Festival in September 2007.

The film was also shown at the Telluride Film Festival, the Deauville Festival of American Cinema in France, the Toronto International Film Festival, the Savannah Film and Video Festival, Starz Denver Film Festival, St. Louis International Film Festival, and the Gijón International Film Festival in Spain. The film opened the 2007 Three Rivers Film Festival in Pittsburgh, Pennsylvania.

=== Box office ===
Grace Is Gone opened in limited release in the United States on December 7, 2007, playing in 4 theaters. Its widest release was in only seven theaters, grossing $50,899 domestically.

Its poor box office performance was attributed to lack of promotion from The Weinstein Company, which some journalists posited was due to the disappointing box office runs of other Iraq war-related films, such as In the Valley of Elah and Lions for Lambs. Said Strouse, "By the time they released it, we were at the tail end of Iraq War film failures and the company didn’t do much to try and distinguish us from the pack."

=== Critical response ===
On review aggregator website Rotten Tomatoes, the film holds an approval rating of 63% based on 73 reviews. The site's critical consensus reads, "A refreshing departure from the current crop of Iraq war dramas, Grace is Gone is a heartfelt, finely acted portrayal of grief and healing." On Metacritic, the film has a weighted average score of 65 out of 100, based on 18 critics, indicating "generally favorable" reviews.

Praise was given to Cusack’s performance, with critics saying it is a "far cry from the usual blithe and breezy" roles Cusack plays. Stephen Holden of The New York Times wrote the "small, tender film about contemporary parenthood in wartime carries off a delicate balancing act." The San Francisco Chronicle's Mick LaSalle wrote it "depicts a side of the Iraq war, the American home front, that has been barely touched in other Iraq war movies", and though the film is politically neutral, audiences "will come away from the experience moved and shaken" regardless of their thoughts on the war. He added O'Keefe’s "scenes with Cusack form the backbone of the picture. Hers is a beautiful portrait of a 12-year-old girl who loves her father but is just beginning to see past him, to understand him as a person and not a god."

Awarding the film 3/4 stars, Roger Ebert wrote that the "story drags its feet a little…considering we know where they're going and what must happen when they get [to the theme park]. And a possible political confrontation between the two brothers is so adroitly sidestepped that the movie, although probably anti-war, never really declares itself. All we have is a father who has lost his wife and two girls who have lost their mother. The way Cusack handles that, it's enough."

More critical reviews cited the film’s manipulativeness and its refusal to make a bigger statement about the war. Elizabeth Weitzman of the Daily News opined, "This is a movie that lobs even appropriate criticisms from a safe distance, a flaw its strengths can't overcome." Of the young actresses, Weitzman said, "Bednarczyk's natural instincts put most programmed Hollywood moppets to shame, and the quietly affecting O'Keefe shows genuine talent. They convey an honest confusion that is consistently more powerful than the black and white (or red and blue) politics that divide the film around them." Lisa Schwarzbaum of Entertainment Weekly wrote the character of Stanley felt underdeveloped.

== Awards and nominations ==
The music in the film received two Golden Globe nominations by the Hollywood Foreign Press Association for the 65th Golden Globe Awards. Strouse's screenplay won the Waldo Salt Screenwriting Award at that year's Sundance Film Festival. Clint Eastwood was nominated for Best Original Score, while the song "Grace is Gone" with music by Eastwood and lyrics by Carole Bayer Sager was nominated for Best Original Song. It won the Satellite Award for Best Song at the 12th Satellite Awards.
