= Shana Dowdeswell =

Zimbabwean-born Hollywood actress

- Born: Shana Elizabeth Dowdeswell; 1 April 1989; Harare, Zimbabwe
- Died: 12 December 2012 (aged 23); Manhattan, New York City
- Occupations: Actress, model
- Years active: 2002–2012
- Partner: Cameron Moneo
- Parents: Roger Dowdeswell (father); Laurie Smith (mother)
- Relatives: Colin Dowdeswell (uncle)

Shana Elizabeth Dowdeswell (1 April 1989 – 12 December 2012) was a Hollywood actress of Zimbabwean descent.

== Personal life ==
Dowdeswell was born on 1 April 1989 in Harare, Zimbabwe. Her father Roger Dowdeswell is a former professional tennis player. Her mother Laurie Smith is a film producer who produced the film The New Twenty. Shana moved to New York City, United States and attended City and Country School, PS 3, and finally PPAS High School. She started acting career at age eight, and later played Anne Frank in a production at the Paper Mill Playhouse.

She had a longtime relationship with her boyfriend Cameron Moneo. She had one younger brother, Jesse.

Shana's uncle Colin Dowdeswell is also a former professional tennis player.

== Death ==
On 7 December 2012, Shana went to a New York City Greenwich Village bar, called The Basement and drank several shots of whiskey. While returning, she stumbled and passed out on the doorstep. A dog walker discovered her unconscious body and she was rushed to Beth Israel Medical Center. After the test, it was found she had a blood alcohol content of 0.39 at the time, five times the state's legal limit for driving. She died on 12 December 2012.

== Career ==
In 2002, Shana appeared in the Frank Higgins' play Miracles and played the role of Eve, an autistic girl. In 2003 she played the role as young version of Jenna in the film 13 Going on 30. However, her acting was cut from the film after test audiences reacted negatively to the original. She later played four different characters in all three primary shows of the Law & Order franchise. Then she acted in television series such as Mercy and Body of Proof. Meanwhile, she also appeared in the films The Stream, The Winning Season, Asylum Seekers, and Choose before her death.

After her death in 2012, five films were released: The Big Wedding (2013), a short film Going South (2013), An Ornament of Faith (2013), short film Wish You Were Here (2013), and Mistress America (2015).

== Filmography ==
Year	Film	Role	Genre	Ref.
1999	Fare Well Miss Fortune	uncredited	Film	
2002	Miracles	Eve	Film	
2002	Garmento	Shopper	Film	
2002	The Stream	The girl	Short film	
2003	13 Going on 30	Young Jenna	Film	
2005	Law & Order: Criminal Intent	Jordan Fernholz	TV series	
2007	Family of the Year	Tatum Sue Holloway	TV series	
2009	Law & Order	Karen Johnson	TV series	
2009	The Winning Season	Molly	Film	
2009	Asylum Seekers	Girlfriend	Film	
2009	Law & Order: Special Victims Unit	Nikki Sherman / Melissa	TV series	
2010	Mercy	Abby Jansen	TV series	
2010	Mercy	Abby Jansen	Film	
2011	Choose	Sara	TV series	
2011	Body of Proof	Maxine Hall / Maxine	TV series	
2013	Teamwork Like Wolves	Jeanie	TV series	
2013	The Big Wedding	Waitress	Film	
2013	Wish You Were Here	Michelle	Short film	
2013	Going South	Martha	Short film	
2015	Mistress America	Ruth	Film	
2017	An Ornament of Faith	Fatima	Film	
