= Justin Theroux =

American actor (born 1971)

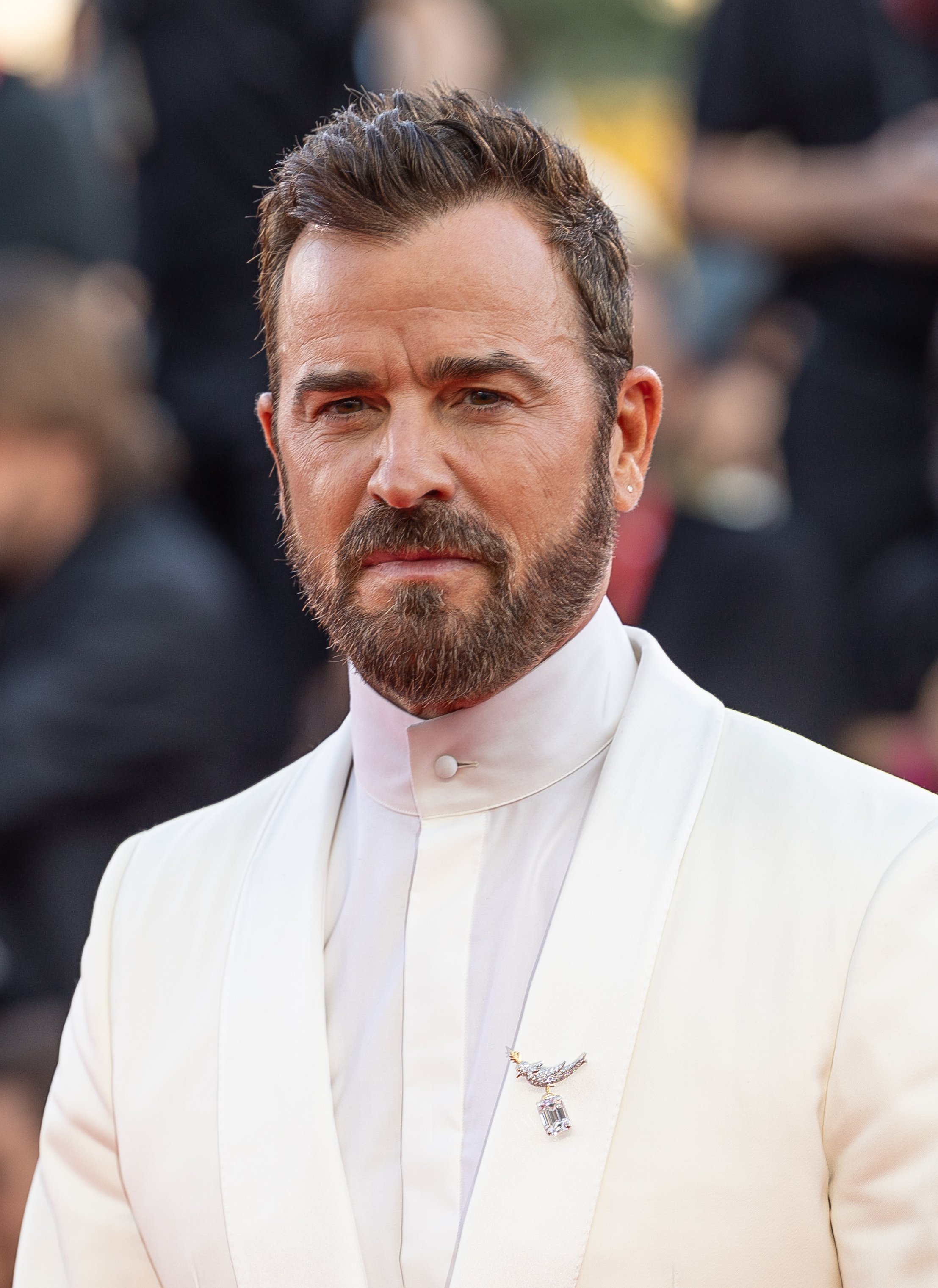
- Theroux in 2024
- Born: Justin Paul Theroux; August 10, 1971 (age 55); Washington, D.C., U.S.
- Education: Bennington College (BA)
- Occupations: Actor; director; producer; screenwriter
- Years active: 1995–present
- Spouses: Jennifer Aniston (m. 2015; div. 2018) Nicole Brydon Bloom (m. 2025)
- Children: 1
- Relatives: Alexander Theroux (uncle); Paul Theroux (uncle); Peter Theroux (uncle); Marcel Theroux (cousin); Louis Theroux (cousin)

Justin Paul Theroux (/θəˈroʊ/ thə-ROH; born August 10, 1971) is an American actor. He gained recognition for his partnership with David Lynch on the surrealist art films Mulholland Drive (2001) and Inland Empire (2006). He also appeared in films such as Romy and Michele's High School Reunion (1997), American Psycho (2000), Zoolander (2001), Charlie's Angels: Full Throttle (2003), Miami Vice (2006), The Girl on the Train (2016), Bumblebee (2018), Beetlejuice Beetlejuice (2024), and The Devil Wears Prada 2 (2026).

Theroux was a screenwriter for such comedy films as Tropic Thunder (2008) and Rock of Ages (2012), as well as the superhero film Iron Man 2 (2010). He made his directorial debut with the romantic comedy film Dedication (2007).

Theroux starred as Kevin Garvey in the HBO mystery drama series The Leftovers (2014–2017), for which he received widespread praise and was nominated for the Critics' Choice Television Award for Best Actor in a Drama Series. Other television roles include the recurring role of Joe in Six Feet Under (2003–2004), Dr. James Mantleray in the Netflix miniseries Maniac (2018), Allie Fox in the Apple TV+ adaptation of The Mosquito Coast (2021–2023), and Mr. House in the Amazon Prime Video adaptation of Fallout (2025–present).

== Early life and education ==
Theroux was born on August 10, 1971, in Washington, D.C. His mother, Phyllis Grissim Theroux, is an essayist and author, and his father, Eugene Albert Theroux (b. 1938), is a lawyer at Baker & McKenzie in Washington. Theroux is the nephew of the travel writer and novelist Paul Theroux, novelist and poet Alexander Theroux, author Peter Theroux, and novelist and educator Joseph Theroux; he is the cousin of British-American journalists and documentary filmmakers Louis and Marcel Theroux. His father is of half French-Canadian and half Italian descent. Through his mother, Theroux is a great-great-grandson of financier, banker and railroad magnate H. B. Hollins, and of music critic and author Gustav Kobbé.

Theroux attended Lafayette Elementary School, Annunciation School, and the Field School. He first started acting while in high school at the Buxton School, in Williamstown, Massachusetts. He graduated from Bennington College in 1993 with a Bachelor of Arts in visual arts and drama.

== Career ==
Theroux made his film debut in 1996 in Mary Harron's I Shot Andy Warhol. Since then he has performed both on Broadway, starring in Observe the Sons of Ulster Marching Towards the Somme; in numerous off-Broadway productions; and in comedy films such as Charlie's Angels: Full Throttle, The Baxter, Romy and Michelle's High School Reunion, Broken Hearts Club, and Zoolander.

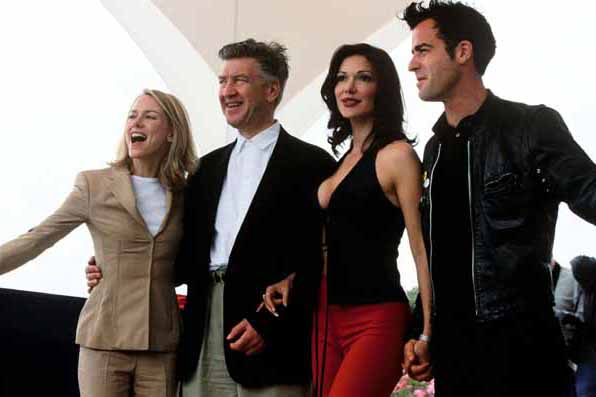
The stars and director of the film Mulholland Drive at the 2001 Cannes Film Festival. Left to right: actor Naomi Watts, director David Lynch, and actors Laura Harring and Justin Theroux

Theroux has also performed in more serious films such as American Psycho. He appeared in the film versions of the cult television shows Strangers With Candy and Michael Mann's Miami Vice. He starred in David Lynch's films Mulholland Drive and Inland Empire.

In 2003, Theroux was featured in a music video for the British band Muse for their song "Hysteria". Theroux also has appeared on television, having starred in The District and appeared on episodes of shows such as Alias, Ally McBeal, Sex and the City (in which he guest starred in two episodes as different characters), and Six Feet Under (in which he played a recurring character in the third and fourth seasons).

In 2006, Theroux directed his first film, Dedication, which premiered at the 2007 Sundance Film Festival. A fan of the band Deerhoof, Theroux chose them to score Dedication. Theroux also had roles in two other films at the festival, Broken English and The Ten, in which he played Jesus Christ alongside Gretchen Mol. Theroux co-wrote the Ben Stiller film Tropic Thunder, and also appeared in the behind-the-scenes mockumentary Tropic Thunder: Rain of Madness.

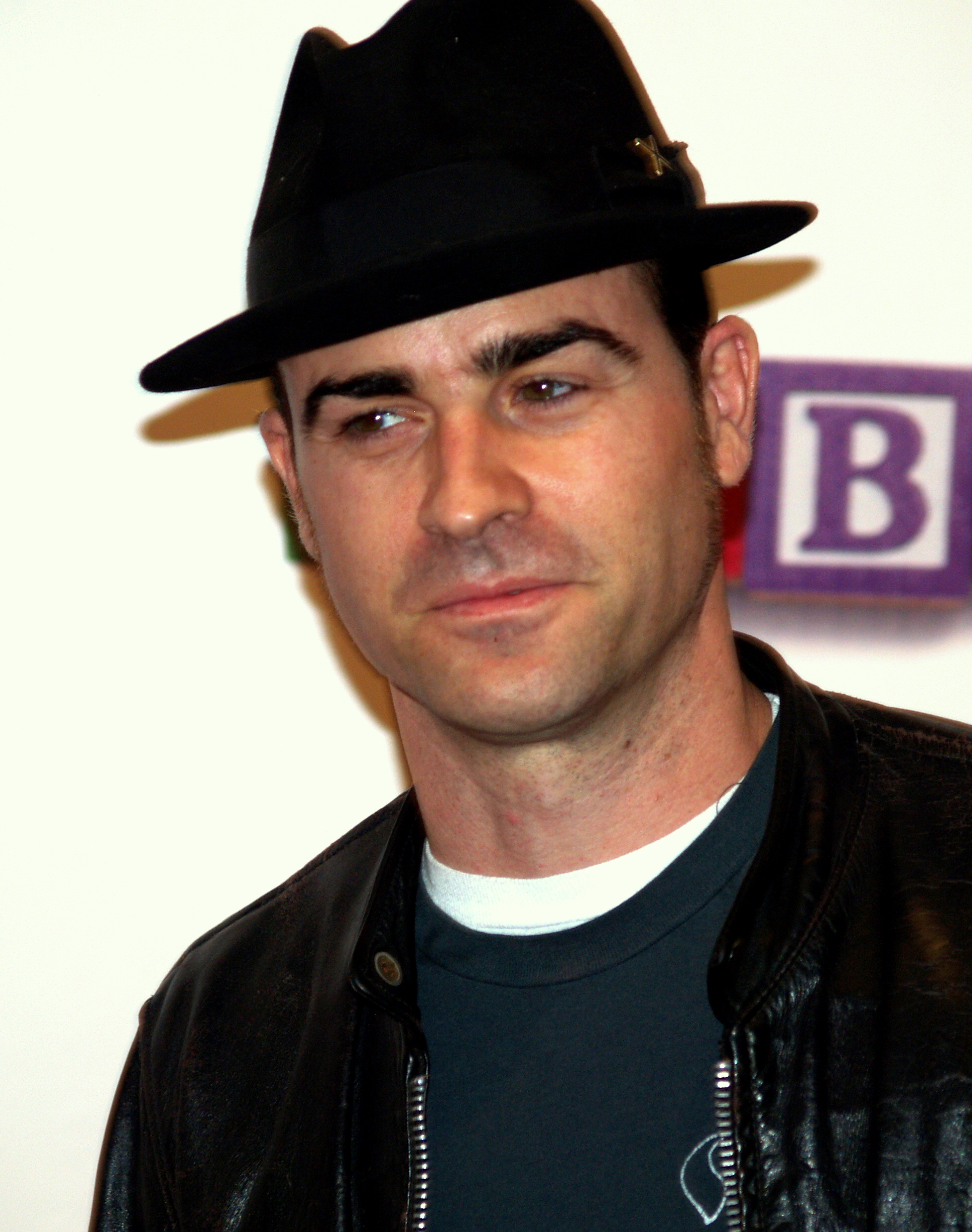
Theroux at the 2008 Tribeca Film Festival

In 2008, Theroux played John Hancock in the HBO miniseries John Adams. In 2009, Theroux made up part of the voice cast for Call of Duty: Modern Warfare 2. He also played Justin in Parks and Recreation. Theroux wrote the screenplay for the 2010 film Iron Man 2. Following Theroux's work on Tropic Thunder, actor Robert Downey Jr. recommended Theroux as a screenwriter to the film's director, Jon Favreau.

Theroux returned to acting in the film Your Highness (2011), as Leezar, an evil wizard who kidnaps a princess. He starred in the 2012 comedy Wanderlust, playing the leader of a hippie commune. By August 2012, Theroux was hired to direct and rewrite the script for the comedy film Swear to God.

In June 2013, Theroux was cast as the lead character in HBO's TV pilot The Leftovers, which HBO ordered as a 10-episode season in September 2013. The series, which premiered June 29, 2014, is based on a book of the same name by Tom Perrotta, which follows a group of people left behind in the suburban community of Mapleton after mysterious disappearances worldwide. Theroux received widespread critical acclaim for his performance throughout the three seasons.

Theroux co-wrote the sequel Zoolander 2 (2016), and reprised his role, Evil DJ, in the film.

Theroux also voiced the character The Evil Lord Garmadon in the 2017 film The Lego Ninjago Movie.

In 2018, Theroux played savant neurochemist James Mantleray in the 2018 Netflix comedy drama miniseries Maniac opposite Emma Stone and Jonah Hill.

In 2019, Theroux produced the ABC television event Live in Front of a Studio Audience alongside Norman Lear, Jimmy Kimmel and Will Ferrell. Theroux received a Primetime Emmy Award for Outstanding Variety Special (Live) for producing the event. He also voiced Tramp in the Disney+ live-action film Lady and the Tramp, a remake of the 1955 film with the same name.

In 2021, Theroux portrayed brilliant inventor and stubborn idealist Allie Fox in the Apple TV+ television series The Mosquito Coast, a television adaptation from the 1981 novel of the same name written by Paul Theroux, Justin Theroux's uncle. Theroux also served as executive producer for the series.

In 2024, Theroux co-starred in the Beetlejuice (1988) sequel, Beetlejuice Beetlejuice.

In 2025, beginning with Season 2 of the Amazon Prime Video adaptation of Fallout, Theroux took over the role of Robert Edwin House, a genius roboticist and ruthless entrepreneur who predicted the coming nuclear apocalypse via mathematical algorithms. The character was originally voiced by René Auberjonois in Fallout: New Vegas, and briefly portrayed by actor Rafi Silver in Season 1 of the adaptation. In Season 2, Silver's role was revealed to be a body double for the real House, portrayed by Theroux.

== Personal life ==
Theroux was in a relationship with stylist and costume designer Heidi Bivens from 1997 until 2011. Theroux began dating actress Jennifer Aniston in 2011 after working with her on the film Wanderlust. They became engaged in August 2012, and were married on August 5, 2015, at their estate. On February 15, 2018, Theroux and Aniston announced they had separated at the end of 2017. In August 2024, Theroux became engaged to actress Nicole Brydon Bloom. The couple married in March 2025. Bloom announced that she gave birth to a son on April 18, 2026.

== Filmography ==
=== Film ===
Year	Title	Role	Notes
1996	I Shot Andy Warhol	Mark	
1997	Romy and Michele's High School Reunion	Clarence	
1997	Below Utopia	Daniel Beckett	
1997	Dream House	Mark Brooks	
1998	Frogs for Snakes	Flav Santana	
1998	Dead Broke	James	
2000	American Psycho	Timothy Bryce	
2000	The Broken Hearts Club	Marshall	
2001	The Sleepy Time Gal	Rebecca's Boyfriend	
2001	Mulholland Drive	Adam Kesher	
2001	Zoolander	Evil DJ	
2002	Peel	Narrator	Voice; short film
2003	Charlie's Angels: Full Throttle	Seamus O'Grady	
2003	Duplex	Coop	
2003	Happy End	Jack	
2005	Strangers with Candy	Carlo Honklin	
2005	The Baxter	Bradley Lake	
2006	The Legend of Lucy Keyes	Guy Cooley	
2006	Return to Rajapur	Jeremy Reardon	
2006	Miami Vice	Detective Larry Zito	
2006	Inland Empire	Devon Berk / Billy Side	
2007	Broken English	Nick Gable	
2007	The Ten	Jesus H. Christ	
2007	Dedication	—N/a	Director and executive producer
2008	Tropic Thunder	UH-1 Huey gunner, Evil DJ (deleted scene)	Cameo; also writer and executive producer
2010	Megamind	Megamind's Father	Voice; also creative consultant
2010	Iron Man 2	—N/a	Writer
2010	Ultimate Iron Man: The Making of 'Iron Man 2'	Himself	Documentary
2011	Your Highness	Leezar	
2012	Wanderlust	Seth	
2012	Rock of Ages	—N/a	Writer
2016	Zoolander 2	Evil DJ	Also writer
2016	The Girl on the Train	Tom Watson	
2016	The Master	Narrator	Voice; short film
2017	The Lego Ninjago Movie	Lord Garmadon	Voice
2017	Star Wars: The Last Jedi	Master Codebreaker	Cameo
2018	Mute	Duck Teddington	
2018	The Spy Who Dumped Me	Drew Thayer	
2018	On the Basis of Sex	Melvin Wulf	
2018	Bumblebee	Dropkick	Voice
2019	Joker	Ethan Chase	Uncredited cameo
2019	Lady and the Tramp	Tramp	Voice
2021	Violet	The Voice	Voice
2021	False Positive	Adrian Martin	
2024	Beetlejuice Beetlejuice	Rory	
2025	Fallout: The Ghoul Log	Robert Edwin House	Audio only
2026	Seekers of Infinite Love		
2026	The Devil Wears Prada 2	Benji Barnes	
TBA	Billion Dollar Spy †	Van Spencer	Post-production

=== Television ===
Year	Title	Role	Notes
1995	Central Park West	Gary Andrews	Episode: "Stephanie and the Wolves"
1998	New York Undercover	Frankie Stone	3 episodes
1998	Ally McBeal	Raymond Brown	Episode: "Just Looking"
1998	Spin City	Pete	Episode: "Local Hero"
1998	Bronx County	Unknown	Pilot
1998–1999	Sex and the City	Jared / Vaughn Wysel	2 episodes
1999	Sirens	Officer David Bontempo	Television film
2000–2001	The District	Nick Pierce	27 episodes
2003	Alias	Simon Walker	2 episodes
2003–2004	Six Feet Under	Joe	8 episodes
2005	Confessions of a Dog	Unknown	Pilot
2008	John Adams	John Hancock	2 episodes
2010	Parks and Recreation	Justin Anderson	4 episodes
2011	Documental	Jan Jurgen	Pilot; also director and writer
2014–2017	The Leftovers	Kevin Garvey	25 episodes
2016	Zoolander: Super Model	—N/a	Television film; executive producer
2017–2020	At Home with Amy Sedaris	Various characters	3 episodes
2018	Maniac	Dr. James K. Mantleray	9 episodes
2019	Live in Front of a Studio Audience	—N/a	Television specials; executive producer
2019	Rick and Morty	Miles Knightly	Voice; episode: "One Crew over the Crewcoo's Morty"
2021–2023	The Mosquito Coast	Allie Fox	17 episodes; also executive producer
2023	White House Plumbers	G. Gordon Liddy	5 episodes; also executive producer
2025	No Taste Like Home with Antoni Porowski	Himself	Episode: "Justin Theroux's Italian Quest"
2025	Poker Face	"The Iguana"	2 episodes
2025	Haha, You Clowns	Justin	Voice; episode: "Therapy"
2025–present	Fallout	Robert Edwin House	5 episodes
2025–present	Running Point	Cam Gordon	9 episodes
2026	The Comeback	Ben Morrow	Episode: "Valerie Cherish"
TBA	Wild Things †	Steve Wynn	Upcoming miniseries

== Awards and nominations ==
List of awards and nominations received by Theroux.

Year	Association	Category	Work	Result	Ref.
2005	Screen Actors Guild Awards	Outstanding Performance by an Ensemble in a Drama Series	Six Feet Under	Nominated	
2016	Critics' Choice Television Awards	Best Actor in a Drama Series	The Leftovers	Nominated	
2016	Dorian Awards	TV Performance of the Year – actor	The Leftovers	Nominated	
2017	IGN Summer Movie Awards	Best Dramatic TV Performance	The Leftovers	Nominated	
2017	Online Film & Television Association Awards	Best Actor in a Drama Series	The Leftovers	Won	
2019	Primetime Emmy Awards	Outstanding Variety Special (Live)	Live in Front of a Studio Audience	Won	
2020	Primetime Emmy Awards	Outstanding Variety Special (Live)	Live in Front of a Studio Audience	Won	
2022	Primetime Emmy Awards	Outstanding Variety Special (Live)	Live in Front of a Studio Audience	Nominated	
2024	Critics' Choice Television Awards	Best Supporting Actor in a Movie/Miniseries	White House Plumbers	Nominated	
