= Everything's Trash =

2022 American comedy television series

- Genre: Comedy
- Based on: Everything's Trash But It's Okay by Phoebe Robinson
- Starring: Phoebe Robinson; Jordan Carlos; Toccarra Cash; Nneka Okafor; Moses Storm
- Country of origin: United States
- Original language: English
- No. of seasons: 1
- No. of episodes: 10

Production
- Executive producers: Phoebe Robinson; Jonathan Groff; Jose Acevedo; Chioke Nassor
- Running time: 20–24 minutes
- Production companies: ABC Signature; Tiny Reparations

Original release
- Network: Freeform
- Release: July 13 – September 7, 2022

Everything's Trash is an American comedy television series that premiered on July 13, 2022 on Freeform. It was created by Phoebe Robinson. In November 2022, the series was canceled after one season. The series was removed from Hulu and Disney+ simultaneously on May 26, 2023.

== Plot ==
The show centers itself around a podcast host navigating life, and sex in Brooklyn.

It picks up when Phoebe's brother, Jayden decides to run for office in New York City. Phoebe, unwittingly, sleeps with the campaign manager for her brother's opponent. News swiftly breaks that Phoebe and Hamilton have slept together when Phoebe is seen leaving Hamilton's apartment the next morning. This causes a rift between Phoebe and Jayden. Phoebe swears that it was a just a one time thing but is upset with Jayden because she feels like he is slut shaming her for her carefree approach to sexual hookups. The siblings make up as the show continues to center on Jayden's political run for office, Phoebe's attempts to cease attraction for Hamilton, and her work-life balance with her podcast role at the company Parakeet.

== Cast and characters ==
=== Main ===
- Phoebe Robinson as Phoebe
- Jordan Carlos as Jayden
- Toccarra Cash as Malika
- Nneka Okafor as Jessie
- Moses Storm as Michael

=== Recurring ===
- Brandon Jay McLaren as Hamilton
- June Diane Raphael as Jax

== Episodes ==
No.	Title	Directed by	Written by	Original release date	U.S. viewers (millions)
1	"Choosing Between Peen & Politics Is Trash"	Chioke Nassor	Phoebe Robinson	July 13, 2022	0.084
2	"Black Excellence Is Trash"	Chioke Nassor	Rae Sanni	July 13, 2022	0.058
3	"Canvassing Is Trash"	Gillian Robespierre	Lauren Bans	July 20, 2022	0.084
4	"Public Image Is Trash"	Gillian Robespierre	Wade Allain-Marcus	July 27, 2022	0.057
5	"Catching Feelings Is Trash"	Meredith Dawson	Laura Gutin Peterson	August 3, 2022	0.066
6	"Family Is Trash"	Meredith Dawson	Jordan Carlos	August 10, 2022	0.050
7	"Rom-Coms Are Mostly Trash"	Wade Allain-Marcus	Calise Hawkins	August 17, 2022	0.064
8	"Being an Auntie Is Trash"	Shahrzad Davani	Niccole Thurman	August 24, 2022	0.029
9	"United Fronts Are Trash"	Shahrzad Davani	Adam Loyd & Devon Walker	August 31, 2022	0.056
10	"Election Night Is Trash"	Chioke Nassor	Phoebe Robinson & Jonathan Groff	September 7, 2022	N/A

== Production ==
=== Development ===
On February 25, 2021, Freeform gave Everything's Trash But It's Okay a pilot order with Phoebe Robinson as the star and writer. On May 4, 2021, the title was changed to Everything's Trash. On September 30, 2021, Everything's Trash had been given a series order. The series premiered on July 13, 2022. On November 11, 2022, Freeform canceled the series after one season.

=== Casting ===
Upon the title change announcement, Jordan Carlos, Toccarra Cash, Nneka Okafor and Moses Storm were cast to star. On May 13, 2021, Jackée Harry and George Wallace were cast in recurring roles.

== Reception ==
=== Ratings ===
Viewership and ratings per episode of Everything's Trash
No.	Title	Air date	Rating (18–49)	Viewers (millions)	DVR (18–49)	DVR viewers (millions)	Total (18–49)	Total viewers (millions)
1	"Choosing Between Peen & Politics is Trash"	July 13, 2022	0.04	0.084	TBD	TBD	TBD	TBD
2	"Black Excellence is Trash"	July 13, 2022	0.02	0.058	TBD	TBD	TBD	TBD
3	"Canvassing is Trash"	July 20, 2022	0.04	0.084	TBD	TBD	TBD	TBD
4	"Public Image is Trash"	July 27, 2022	0.02	0.057	TBD	TBD	TBD	TBD
5	"Catching Feelings Is Trash"	August 3, 2022	0.03	0.066	TBD	TBD	TBD	TBD
6	"Family is Trash"	August 10, 2022	0.03	0.050	TBD	TBD	TBD	TBD
7	"Rom-Coms Are Mostly Trash"	August 17, 2022	0.03	0.064	TBD	TBD	TBD	TBD
8	"Being an Auntie is Trash"	August 24, 2022	0.01	0.029	TBD	TBD	TBD	TBD
9	"United Fronts Are Trash"	August 31, 2022	0.03	0.056	TBD	TBD	TBD	TBD
