= Her Composition =

2015 fantasy adventure drama film

- Film poster
- Directed by: Stephan Littger
- Written by: Stephan Littger
- Produced by: Leah Chen Baker; Isabel Kleber; Stephan Littger
- Starring: Joslyn Jensen
- Cinematography: Andres Karu
- Edited by: Stephan Littger
- Music by: Christopher Libertino
- Release date: October 30, 2015 (Austin)
- Running time: 93 minutes
- Countries: United States; Germany
- Language: English

Her Composition is a 2015 German American fantasy adventure drama film, written and directed by Stephan Littger, and starring Joslyn Jensen.

== Plot ==
A talented, artistically stuck composition student starts seeing escort clients after failing to secure her scholarship. Struck with unexpected sounds during her sexual encounters, she turns them into music and the clients into her collective muse.

== Cast ==
- Joslyn Jensen as Malorie Gilman
- Heather Matarazzo as Gallery Owner
- Lulu Wilson as Victoria
- Christian Campbell as Client I
- E.J. Carroll as Vice Branch Manager

== Release ==
The film premiered at the Austin Film Festival on October 30, 2015.

== Reception ==
The film has a 100% approval rating on the review aggregator website Rotten Tomatoes, based on six reviews.

Bradley Gibson of Film Threat rated the film a 7 out of 10. Jessi Cape of The Austin Chronicle wrote, "This is absolutely a thinking film, but a bizarrely beautiful and entertaining one as well."
