= Jessica Williams (actress) =

American actress (born 1989)

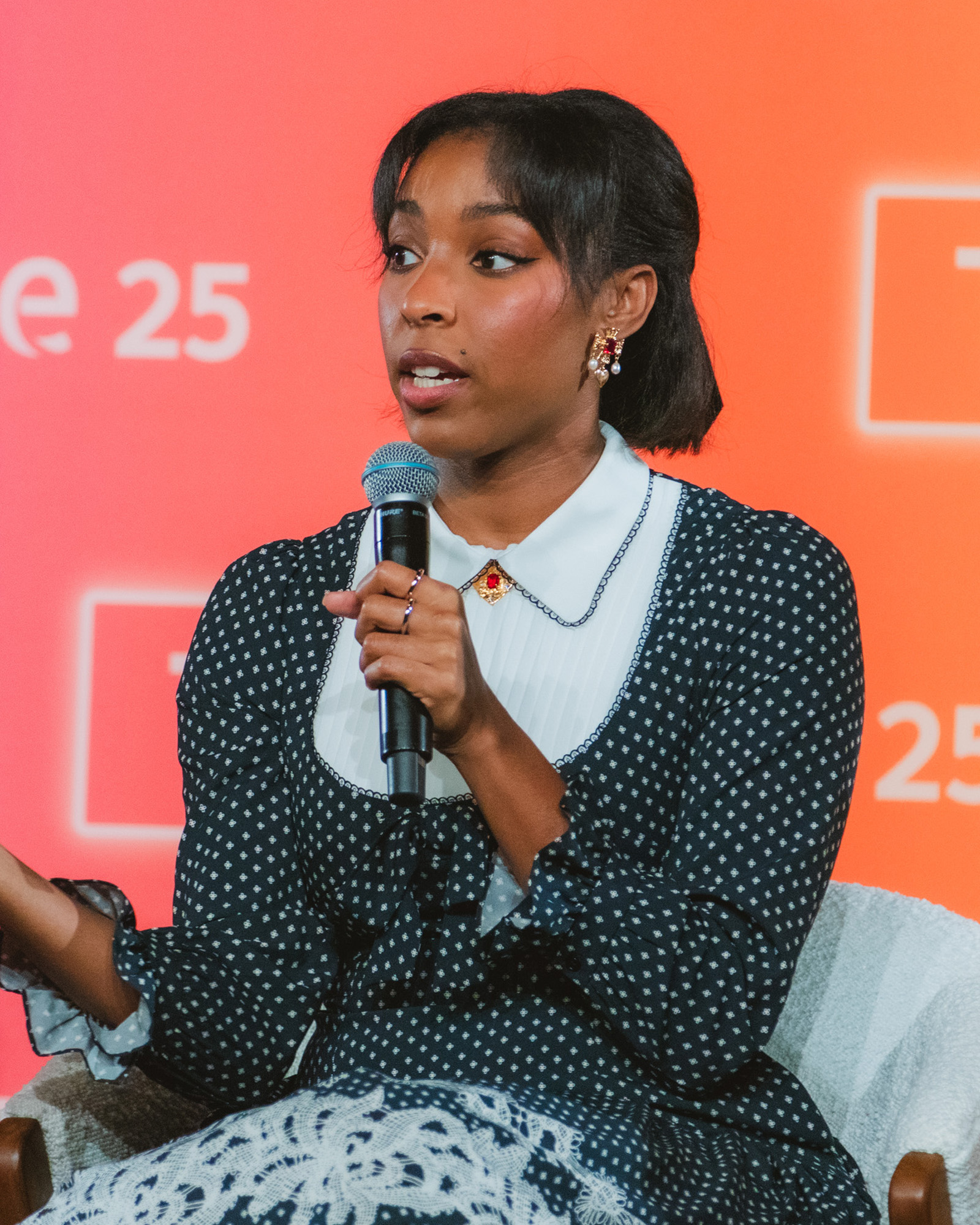
- Williams in 2025
- Born: Jessica Renee Williams; July 31, 1989 (age 37); Los Angeles, California, U.S.
- Education: California State University, Long Beach
- Occupations: Actress and comedian
- Years active: 2006–present

Jessica Renee Williams (born July 31, 1989) is an American actress and comedian. She has appeared as a senior correspondent on The Daily Show (2012–2016, 2024–present), as cohost of the podcast 2 Dope Queens (2016–2019), as Lally Hicks in the Fantastic Beasts film series (2018–2022), as Gaby in Shrinking (2023–present), and as Meadow in Entergalactic (2022).

== Early life ==
Williams was born on July 31, 1989, in Los Angeles County, California. She attended Nathaniel Narbonne High School, where she studied drama. She made her television debut as a series regular on Nickelodeon, in the 2006 series, Just for Kicks. In 2012, at 22 years old, she became The Daily Show's youngest correspondent in its history (to that time).

Williams attended California State University, Long Beach.

== Career ==
Williams made her Daily Show debut on January 11, 2012. Williams is a frequent performer at the Upright Citizens Brigade Theatre in Los Angeles. Williams also made appearances on Season 3 of HBO's Girls. She currently resides in Brooklyn, New York and Los Angeles, California. She appeared in the film People Places Things. She cohosted the comedy podcast 2 Dope Queens with Phoebe Robinson. Williams appears in an HBO special spun off from the podcast in February 2018. She appeared on her last regular Daily Show episode on June 30, 2016, but returned for guest appearances on April 22, 2024, October 28, 2024, and July 29, 2025. She starred in the 2017 Netflix comedy movie The Incredible Jessica James, as a character described by The Guardian as "a struggling Brooklyn-based playwright navigating the murky waters of modern romance while waiting impatiently for her big break."

Williams appeared in the sequels of Fantastic Beasts and Where to Find Them, titled Fantastic Beasts: The Crimes of Grindelwald and Fantastic Beasts: The Secrets of Dumbledore as Lally Hicks, a teacher from Ilvermorny School of Witchcraft and Wizardry. In 2023, Williams was a main cast member in the Apple TV+ show Shrinking. For her performance, she earned two nominations for the Primetime Emmy Award for Outstanding Supporting Actress in a Comedy Series.

== Filmography ==
=== Film ===
Year	Title	Role	Notes
2011	Crying in Public	Coffee Shop Crier	Short film
2013	Delivery Man	Tanya	
2015	People Places Things	Kat	
2015	Hot Tub Time Machine 2	Herself	Cameo role
2015	Tap Shoes & Violins	Charlie	Short film
2017	The Incredible Jessica James	Jessica James	Also executive producer
2018	Fantastic Beasts: The Crimes of Grindelwald	Lally Hicks	
2019	Corporate Animals	Jess	
2019	Booksmart	Miss Fine	
2020	Omniboat: A Fast Boat Fantasia	TBA	
2022	Fantastic Beasts: The Secrets of Dumbledore	Lally Hicks	
2024	Road House	Frankie	

=== Television ===
Year	Title	Role	Notes
2006	Just for Kicks	Vida Atwood	13 episodes
2012–2016, 2024, 2025	The Daily Show	Herself (correspondent)	143 episodes
2014	Girls	Karen	4 episodes
2018–2019	2 Dope Queens	Herself	8 episodes
2019	The Twilight Zone	Rei Tanaka	Episode: "Six Degrees of Freedom"
2021	I Heart Arlo	Elena	Voice role
2021	Love Life	Mia Hines	Main role
2022	Entergalactic	Meadow Watson	Voice role, television film
2023–present	Shrinking	Dr. Gaby Evans	Main role

=== Podcast ===
Year	Title	Role	Notes
2016–2018	2 Dope Queens	Herself (cohost)	Also co-creator, writer, executive producer

== Awards and nominations ==
Year	Award	Category	Work	Result	Ref.
2023	Primetime Emmy Awards	Outstanding Supporting Actress in a Comedy Series	Shrinking	Nominated	
2024	Critics' Choice Television Awards	Best Supporting Actress in a Comedy Series	Shrinking	Nominated	
2025	Actor Awards	Outstanding Performance by an Ensemble in a Comedy Series	Shrinking	Nominated	
2025	Primetime Emmy Awards	Outstanding Supporting Actress in a Comedy Series	Shrinking	Nominated	
2026	Primetime Emmy Awards	Outstanding Supporting Actress in a Comedy Series	Shrinking	Nominated	
