= Julia Stiles =

American actress (born 1981)

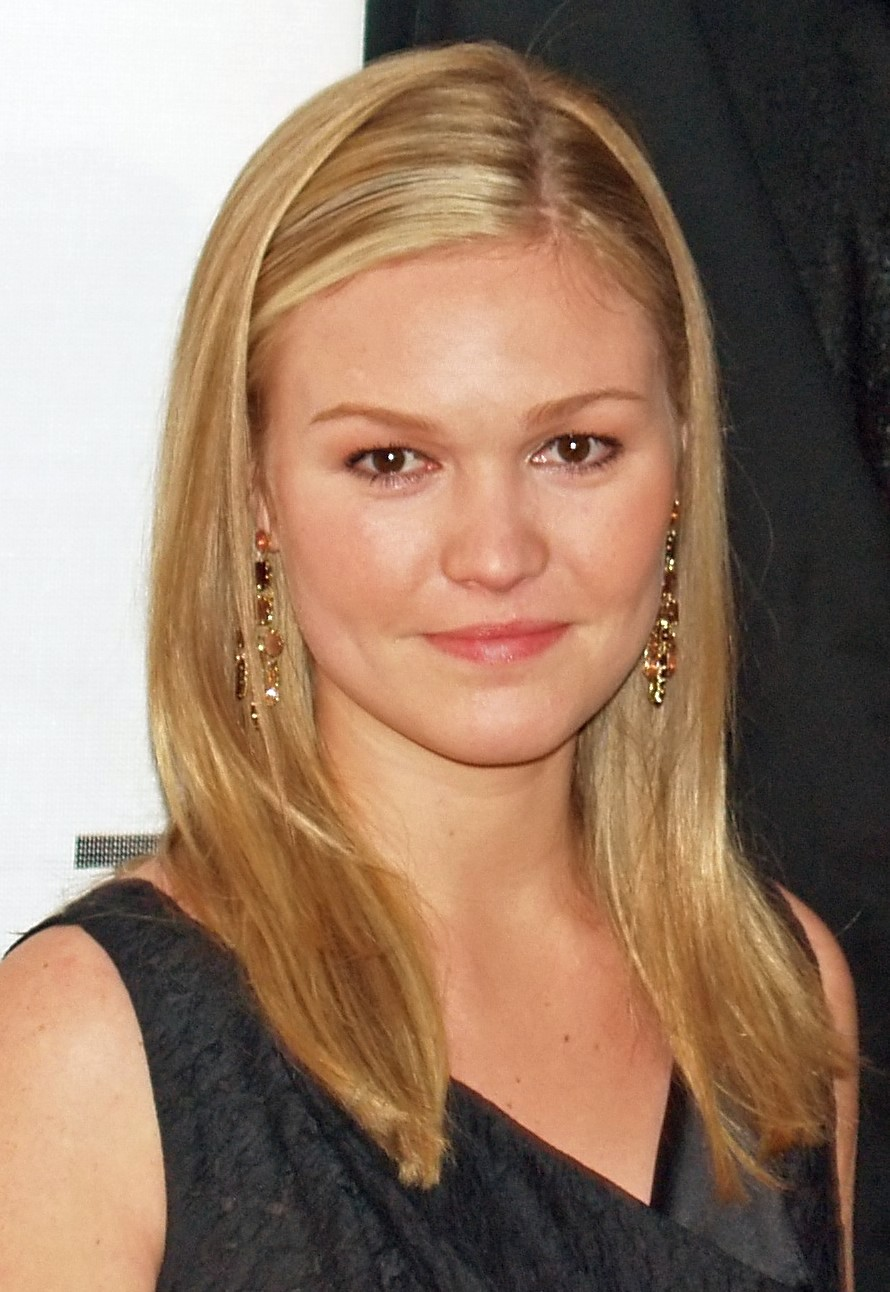
- Stiles in 2007
- Born: Julia O'Hara Stiles; March 28, 1981 (age 45); New York City, U.S.
- Education: Columbia University (BA)
- Occupation: Actress
- Years active: 1993–present
- Spouse: Preston J. Cook (m. 2017)
- Children: 3

Julia O'Hara Stiles (born March 28, 1981) is an American actress. Stiles began acting at the age of 11 as part of New York's La MaMa Experimental Theatre Club. Her film debut was a small role at age 15 in I Love You, I Love You Not (1996), followed by a lead role in Wicked (1998) for which she received the Karlovy Vary Film Festival Award for Best Actress. Stiles co-starred in the made-for-TV mini-series The '60s (1999) as a teenage daughter in a middle-class American family from Chicago. She rose to prominence with leading roles in teen films such as 10 Things I Hate About You (1999), Down to You (2001), and Save the Last Dance (2001). Her accolades include a Teen Choice Award and two MTV Movie Awards, as well as nominations for a Golden Globe Award, and Primetime Emmy Award.

Stiles added to her list of credits with films such as The Business of Strangers (2001), Mona Lisa Smile (2003), and The Omen (2006), and became known to audiences worldwide with her portrayal of Nicky Parsons in the Bourne franchise (2002–2016). Her other notable film credits include Hamlet, State and Main (both 2000), O (2001), A Guy Thing (2002), Carolina (2003), The Prince & Me (2004), Edmond, A Little Trip to Heaven (both 2005), The Cry of the Owl (2009), Silver Linings Playbook (2012), Out of the Dark (2014), Blackway (2015), 11:55 (2016), Hustlers (2019) and Orphan: First Kill (2022).

Outside of film, Stiles played Lumen Pierce on the fifth season of Dexter (2010), earning nominations for the Golden Globe for Best Supporting Actress and the Primetime Emmy for Outstanding Guest Actress. From 2012 to 2014 she appeared as the titular character in the web series Blue, for which she earned two IAWTV Awards for Best Actress. From 2017 to 2020 she starred as Georgina Ryland on the Sky Atlantic series Riviera. She starred in the Amazon series The Lake (2022–2023).

== Early life ==
Stiles was born in New York City to Judith Newcomb Stiles, a Greenwich Village artist, and John O'Hara, a businessman. She is the oldest of three children. Stiles is of English, Irish, and German descent. She started acting at age 11, performing with New York's La MaMa Theatre Company.

Stiles grew up in SoHo, Manhattan with her siblings Jane and John.

== Career ==
=== Film and television ===
After finding an agent, Stiles began auditioning for television in 1993 and films in 1996. She made her acting debut in 1993 on the mystery show Ghostwriter as Erica Dansby.

Stiles's first film role was in I Love You, I Love You Not (1996), with Claire Danes and Jude Law. She also had small roles as Harrison Ford's character's daughter in Alan J. Pakula's The Devil's Own (1997) and in M. Night Shyamalan's Wide Awake (1998). Her first lead was in Wicked (1998), in which she played a teenage girl who might have murdered her mother so she could have her father all to herself. Critic Joe Baltake wrote she was "the darling of the 1998 Sundance Film Festival." She next starred in the TV miniseries The '60s in 1999.

Stiles was cast at the age of 17 for the role of Kat Stratford, opposite Heath Ledger in Gil Junger's 10 Things I Hate About You (1999), an adaptation of Shakespeare's The Taming of the Shrew set in high school. She won an MTV Movie Award for Breakthrough Female Performance for the role. The Chicago Film Critics Association voted her as the most promising new actress of 1999. Her next starring role was in Down to You (2000), which was panned by critics, but earned both her and her co-star Freddie Prinze, Jr. a Teen Choice Award nomination for their on-screen chemistry. She subsequently appeared in two more Shakespearean adaptations. The first was as Ophelia in Michael Almereyda's Hamlet (2000), with Ethan Hawke in the lead. The second was in the Desdemona role, opposite Mekhi Phifer, in Tim Blake Nelson's O (2001), a version of Othello set at a boarding school. Neither film was a great success; O was subject to many delays and a change of distributors, and Hamlet was an art house film shot on a minimal budget.

Stiles's next commercial success was in Save the Last Dance (2001) as an aspiring ballerina forced to leave her small town in downstate Illinois to live with her struggling musician father in Chicago after her mother dies in a car accident. At her new, nearly all-black school, she falls in love with the character played by Sean Patrick Thomas who teaches her hip-hop dancing to help get her into the Juilliard School. The role won her two more MTV awards for Best Kiss and Best Female Performance and a Teen Choice Award for best fight scene for her battle with Bianca Lawson. Rolling Stone magazine named her "the coolest co-ed" and put her on the cover of its April 12, 2001, issue. She told Rolling Stone that she performed all her own dancing in the film, except for some closeups of the feet.

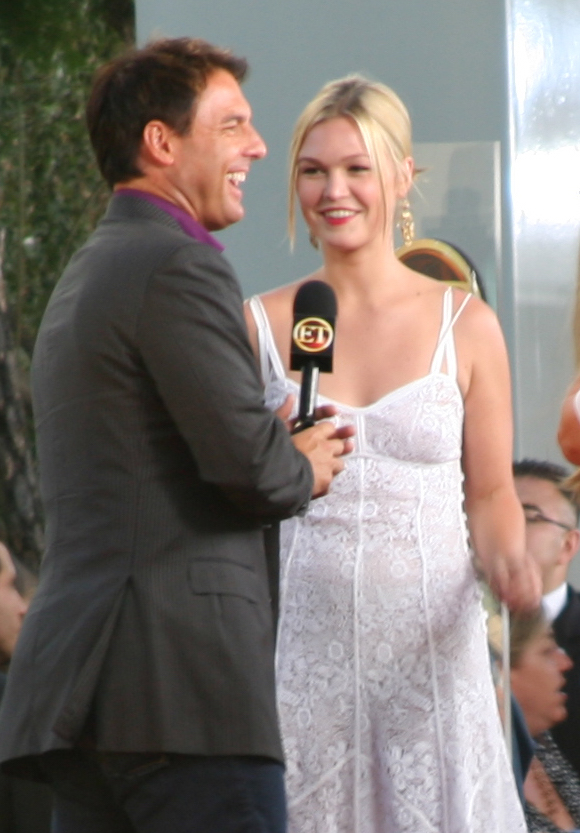
Stiles being interviewed by Mark Steines, 2007

In David Mamet's State and Main (2000), about a film shooting on location in a small town in Vermont, Stiles played a teenage girl who seduces a film actor (Alec Baldwin) with a weakness for teen girls. Stiles also appeared opposite Stockard Channing in the dark art house film The Business of Strangers (2001) as a conniving, amoral secretary who exacts revenge on her boss. Channing was impressed by her co-star: "In addition to her talent, she has a quality that is almost feral, something that can make people uneasy. She has an effect on people." Stiles later described the Bourne franchise as very important for her career, stating that it "reinvented the action genre, especially for female characters". Her small role as Treadstone operative Nicolette "Nicky" Parsons in The Bourne Identity (2002) grew in The Bourne Supremacy (2004), then greatly expanded in The Bourne Ultimatum (2007).

Between the Bourne films, she appeared in Mona Lisa Smile (2003) as Joan, a student at Wellesley College in 1953, whose art professor (Julia Roberts) encourages her to pursue a career in law rather than become a wife and mother. Critic Stephen Holden called her one of cinema's "brightest young stars", but the film met with generally unfavorable reviews. Stiles played a Wisconsin college student who is swept off her feet by a Danish prince, played by Luke Mably, in The Prince and Me (2004), directed by Martha Coolidge. Stiles told an interviewer that she was very similar to her character Paige Morgan. Critic Scott Foundas said she was "irrepressibly engaging" and the film was a "strange career choice for Stiles". This echoed criticism in reviews of A Guy Thing (2003), a romantic comedy with Jason Lee and Selma Blair. Critic Dennis Harvey wrote that Stiles was "wasted", and Holden called her "a serious actress from whom comedy does not seem to flow naturally". In 2006, Stiles starred opposite her Hamlet co-star Liev Schreiber in The Omen, a remake of the 1976 horror film. She returned to the Bourne series with a much larger role in The Bourne Ultimatum (2007), her highest-grossing film to date.

Stiles acted in Between Us (2012) with Taye Diggs, David Harbour, and Melissa George. Between Us is the screen adaptation of the off-Broadway play of the same name by Joe Hortua. Stiles starred alongside David Cross and America Ferrera in the dark comedy It's a Disaster. The film premiered at the 2012 Los Angeles Film Festival and was picked up by Oscilloscope Laboratories and received a limited release the next year. Stiles had a small but pivotal role as a reporter in the 2013 British-American film Closed Circuit. Stiles starred in the indie supernatural thriller Out of the Dark (2014) alongside Scott Speedman and Stephen Rea.

In 2015, Stiles signed on to reprise her role as Nicky Parsons in Jason Bourne, the fifth installment of the Bourne franchise. She also featured as Courtney, the wayward mother of Sophie Nélisse, in The Great Gilly Hopkins (2016). In 2019, Stiles appeared in the movie Hustlers as the journalist, Elizabeth. The film was a box office success.

In 2026, Stiles was announced as a contestant on Dancing with the Stars Season 35, partnered with Ezra Sosa. She finished in 8th place. On the show's "Dedication Night", she performed a contemporary routine to "Can't Take My Eyes Off You" by Frankie Valli dedicated to Heath Ledger, her costar in the film "10 Things I Hate About You".

=== Stage ===
While Stiles performed in a school play in fourth grade, Bob McGrath of Ridge Theater in Manhattan, a friend of her parents, needed an actor for a nonspeaking role. Stiles's first theatrical roles were in works by author/composer John Moran at Ridge Theater from 1993 to 1998. In the summer of 2002, she performed on stage in Eve Ensler's The Vagina Monologues, and appeared as Viola, the lead role in Shakespeare in the Park's production of Twelfth Night with Jimmy Smits.

In 2004, she made her West End stage debut opposite Aaron Eckhart in a revival of David Mamet's play Oleanna at the Garrick Theatre. She reprised the role of Carol in a 2009 production of Oleanna, directed by Doug Hughes and co-starring Bill Pullman at the Mark Taper Forum. The production moved to Broadway's John Golden Theatre.

Stiles was to play Jeannie in a production of Neil LaBute's Fat Pig directed by the playwright beginning in spring 2011, but the show was postponed indefinitely.

=== Other work ===
Stiles appeared in the video for Cyndi Lauper's single "Sally's Pigeons" in 1993. In 2001, she hosted Saturday Night Live and returned to parody as then-President George W. Bush's daughter Jenna Bush in a skit that poked fun at the two first daughters for being arrested for underage drinking. MTV profiled her in its Diary series in 2003, and she was Punk'd by Ashton Kutcher at a Washington, D.C., museum in 2004.

In 2010, Stiles played a major role in 10 episodes of the Showtime series Dexter For this role, she received a nomination for the Golden Globe Award for Best Supporting Actress – Series, Miniseries or Television Film, as well as a Primetime Emmy Award for Outstanding Guest Actress in a Drama Series.

In 2012, the web series Blue starred Stiles as a single mother with a 13-year-old son. She works at an office and also as a call girl to make ends meet on an otherwise meager income fighting to protect her son from the collision between her complicated past and tenuous present. For her work on Blue, Stiles won two IAWTV Awards, in 2013 and 2014. The actress during the recordings shared set with artists like Michelle Forbes, JC Gonzalez, and Uriah Shelton.

Stiles played Maisy-May in the Canadian Amazon Prime series The Lake. Maisy-May is the "picture-perfect" stepdaughter/stepsister who was given the family cottage by her stepfather, to the dismay of her stepbrother Justin. Season 1 premiered in summer 2022.

=== Film director ===
Stiles made her writing and directorial debut with Elle magazine's short Raving starring Zooey Deschanel. It premiered at the 2007 Tribeca Film Festival.

Stiles' first feature film as a director, Wish You Were Here, was released in January 2025.

== Personal life ==
Stiles graduated from Columbia University with a degree in English literature in 2005. She almost turned down the first Bourne film because of college exams, and deferred a semester for the first two films. At Columbia she dated her 10 Things I Hate About You co-star Joseph Gordon-Levitt and the two lived in John Jay Hall. She and actor David Harbour were in a relationship between 2011 and 2015. In 2010, she received a John Jay Award, an honorary award given annually to five alumni by the Columbia College Alumni Association for professional achievements.

Stiles has also worked for Habitat for Humanity, building housing in Costa Rica, and has worked with Amnesty International to raise awareness of the harsh conditions of immigration detention of unaccompanied juveniles. In January 2004, Marie Claire featured Stiles's trip to witness conditions at the Berks County Youth Center in Leesport, Pennsylvania.

Stiles is a former vegan, occasionally eating red meat. She says she gave up veganism after she developed anemia and found it difficult to get proper nutrition while traveling.

She has described herself as a feminist and wrote about the subject in The Guardian.

She is a fan of baseball and the New York Mets. She threw the ceremonial first pitch before their May 29, 2006, game.

In September 2017 Stiles married camera assistant Preston J. Cook with whom she worked on Blackway. They have three children.

== Filmography ==
=== Film ===
List of Julia Stiles film credits
Year	Title	Role	Notes
1996	I Love You, I Love You Not	Young Nana's Friend	
1997	The Devil's Own	Bridget O'Meara	
1998	Wicked	Ellie Christianson	
1998	Wide Awake	Neena Beal	
1999	10 Things I Hate About You	Kat Stratford	
2000	Down to You	Imogen	
2000	Hamlet	Ophelia	
2000	State and Main	Carla	
2001	Save the Last Dance	Sara Johnson	
2001	The Business of Strangers	Paula Murphy	
2001	O	Desi Brable	
2002	The Bourne Identity	Nicolette "Nicky" Parsons	
2003	A Guy Thing	Becky	
2003	Carolina	Carolina Mirabeau	
2003	Mona Lisa Smile	Joan Brandwyn	
2004	The Prince and Me	Paige Morgan	
2004	The Bourne Supremacy	Nicolette "Nicky" Parsons	
2005	Edmond	Glenna	
2005	A Little Trip to Heaven	Isold	
2006	The Omen	Katherine Thorn	
2007	The Bourne Ultimatum	Nicolette "Nicky" Parsons	
2007	Raving	—N/a	Short film, director and writer
2008	Gospel Hill	Rosie	
2009	The Cry of the Owl	Jenny Thierolf	
2009	Passage	Ella	Short film
2012	Silver Linings Playbook	Veronica Maxwell	
2012	Stars in Shorts	Young Woman	Short film, segment: Sexting
2012	It's a Disaster	Tracy Scott	
2012	Girl Most Likely	Stage Imogene	
2013	Between Us	Grace	
2013	Closed Circuit	Joanna Reece	
2014	Out of the Dark	Sarah Harriman	Direct-to-video
2015	The Great Gilly Hopkins	Courtney Rutherford Hopkins	
2015	Blackway	Lillian	
2016	Misconduct	Jane	Direct-to-video
2016	Jason Bourne	Nicolette "Nicky" Parsons	
2016	The Drowning	Lauren Seymour	Direct-to-video
2016	11:55	Janine	
2017	Trouble	Rachel	
2019	Hustlers	Elizabeth	
2021	The God Committee	Dr. Jordan Taylor	
2022	Jennifer Lopez: Halftime	Herself	Documentary
2022	Orphan: First Kill	Tricia Albright	
2024	Chosen Family	Clio	
2025	Wish You Were Here	—N/a	Director, writer and producer

=== Television ===
List of Julia Stiles television credits
Year	Title	Role	Notes
1993–1994	Ghostwriter	Erica Dansby	6 episodes
1996	Promised Land	Megan Walker	Episode: "The Secret"
1997	Chicago Hope	Corey Sawicki	Episode: "Mother, May I?"
1997	Before Women Had Wings	Phoebe Jackson	Television film
1999	The '60s	Katie Herlihy	Miniseries
2001, 2023	Saturday Night Live	Jenna Bush; Host/Herself; Herself	Episode: "Pierce Brosnan/Destiny's Child" (uncredited); Episode: "Julia Stiles/Aerosmith"; Episode: "Adam Driver/Olivia Rodrigo" (cameo)
2004	Punk'd	Herself	Episode: "Kaley Cuoco/The Rock/Julia Stiles"
2009	The City	Herself	Episode: "I Lost Myself in Us"
2010	Dexter	Lumen Pierce	8 episodes
2012	Midnight Sun	Leah Kafka	Television film
2013	The Makeover	Hannah Higgins	Television film
2014	The Mindy Project	Dr. Jessica Lieberstein	3 episodes
2017–2020	Riviera	Georgina Clios	Main role
2021–2022	DreamWorks Dragons: The Nine Realms	Olivia Kullersen	Voice, Main role
2022–2023	The Lake	Maisy-May Lin	Main role
2026	Dancing with the Stars	Herself	Contestant (season 35); Finished in 8th place

=== Web series ===
List of Julia Stiles web series credits
Year	Title	Role	Notes
2012–2015	Blue	Blue	Lead role, 40 episodes

=== Theme park ===
List of Julia Stiles theme park credits
Year	Title	Role	Notes
2020	The Bourne Stuntacular	Nicolette "Nicky" Parsons	

== Theatre ==
List of Julia Stiles stage credits
Year	Title	Role	Venue	Ref.
2008	The 24 Hour Plays of 2008	Steph	American Airlines Theatre, Broadway	
2009	Oleanna	Carol	John Golden Theatre, Broadway	
2009	The 24 Hour Plays of 2009	Julia	American Airlines Theatre, Broadway	

== Awards and nominations ==
List of awards and nominations received by Julia Stiles
Year	Association	Category	Project	Result
1998	Karlovy Vary International Film Festival	Best Actress Award	Wicked	Won
1999	Chicago Film Critics Association Award	Most Promising Actress	10 Things I Hate About You	Won
1999	MTV Movie Award	Best Breakthrough Performance – Female	10 Things I Hate About You	Won
1999	Teen Choice Award	Choice Movie Breakout Performance – Female	10 Things I Hate About You	Nominated
1999	Teen Choice Award	Choice Movie Sexiest Love Scene (Shared with Heath Ledger)	10 Things I Hate About You	Nominated
1999	YoungStar Award	Best Young Actress in a Comedy Film	10 Things I Hate About You	Nominated
2000	Teen Choice Award	Choice Movie Chemistry (Shared with Freddie Prinze, Jr.)	Down to You	Won
2000	Teen Choice Award	Choice Movie Actress	Down to You	Nominated
2000	Florida Film Critics Circle	Best Cast	State and Main	Won
2000	Online Film Critics Society	Best Cast	State and Main	Won
2000	National Board of Review	Best Cast	State and Main	Won
2001	MTV Movie Award	Best Kiss (Shared with Sean Patrick Thomas)	Save the Last Dance	Won
2001	Teen Choice Award	Choice Movie Actress	Save the Last Dance	Won
2001	Teen Choice Award	Choice Movie Fight Scene (Shared with Bianca Lawson)	Save the Last Dance	Won
2001	MTV Movie Award	Best Female Performance	Save the Last Dance	Nominated
2001	Satellite Award	Best Supporting Actress – Motion Picture	The Business of Strangers	Nominated
2003	Teen Choice Award	Choice Movie Actress – Drama/Action Adventure	Mona Lisa Smile	Nominated
2004	Teen Choice Award	Choice Movie Actress – Drama/Action Adventure	The Prince and Me	Nominated
2006	Teen Choice Award	Choice Movie Scream	The Omen	Nominated
2010	Primetime Emmy Award	Outstanding Guest Actress in a Drama Series	Dexter	Nominated
2010	Golden Globe Award	Best Supporting Actress – Television	Dexter	Nominated
2010	Golden Nymph	Outstanding Actress – Drama Series	Dexter	Nominated
2012	Critics' Choice Movie Award	Best Cast	Silver Linings Playbook	Won
2012	Detroit Film Critics Society	Best Ensemble	Silver Linings Playbook	Nominated
2012	Gotham Award	Best Ensemble Performance	Silver Linings Playbook	Nominated
2012	Screen Actors Guild Award	Outstanding Cast in a Motion Picture	Silver Linings Playbook	Nominated
