= The Incredible Jessica James =

2017 film by James C. Strouse

- Film poster
- Directed by: James C. Strouse
- Written by: James C. Strouse
- Produced by: Michael B. Clark; Alex Turtletaub
- Starring: Jessica Williams; Chris O'Dowd; Noël Wells; LaKeith Stanfield; Megan Ketch; Zabryna Guevara
- Cinematography: Sean McElwee
- Edited by: Jesse Gordon
- Music by: Keegan DeWitt
- Production company: Beachside Films
- Distributed by: Netflix
- Release dates: January 27, 2017 (Sundance Film Festival); July 28, 2017 (United States)
- Running time: 83 minutes
- Country: United States
- Language: English

The Incredible Jessica James is a 2017 American romantic comedy film written and directed by James C. Strouse and starring Jessica Williams, Chris O'Dowd, Noël Wells, Lakeith Stanfield, Megan Ketch and Zabryna Guevara. It was released on Netflix on July 28, 2017.

== Plot ==
Jessica James is a fiercely independent woman who has recently split from her boyfriend Damon. She tries to meet someone through Tinder, but she isn't convinced. Jessica had actually arranged the date to run into Damon to make him jealous.

Jessica's best friend Tasha gets her a job as a waitperson in a Manhattan event, but Jessica acts very unprofessionally by telling everyone who will listen about her problems. Tasha sets her up on a blind date with Boone. It gets off to a bad start when Jessica is bluntly honest. She explains her recent breakup while he tells her of his recent divorce. They hit it off anyway, and wind up spending the night together.

Jessica is a playwright, but her submissions are repeatedly rejected. To make ends meet, she works with kids at a children's theatre workshop in Hell's Kitchen. Boone lives off of proceeds from an app he created. Despite liking Boone she keeps imagining and dreaming that she's in random situations with Damon.

One evening, Jessica and Boone meet for a walk and admit that they obsessively follow their respective exes' social media. They agree to unfollow them and, since they immediately regret it, they agree to follow each other's exes instead as a way to keep tabs on them indirectly and move on. That night she dreams that Damon came to confront her, and before he can explain himself he is crushed by a piano that falls from the sky.

Jessica goes back to her childhood home in Ohio for the weekend for her little sister's baby shower. There, she's reminded of both her lifelong obsession with theater as well as why she no longer fits in that world.

Back in NYC, they go on more dates, and Jessica starts to fall for Boone. But when she drops in on him unexpectedly, she finds him in a seemingly compromising position with his ex-wife. He tries to explain but she leaves, hurt.

Jessica focuses on her children's workshop. They go on their weekend writers workshop, where she meets her idol playwright Sarah Jones. She makes her realize that the reward of theater is the work itself. Eventually she and Boone meet in the park and reconcile.

Jessica gets an offer to lead a stage reading of one of her plays in London, and Boone offers to get her there using his frequent-flyer miles. Instead of him going with her, the final scene shows her on the flight with Tasha and Shandra, one of her students, who speculate that Boone must be her "boyfriend" to have given them free tickets to accompany her.

== Cast ==
- Jessica Williams as Jessica James
- Chris O'Dowd as Boone
- Noël Wells as Tasha
- Lakeith Stanfield as Damon
- Will Stephen as Tinder Guy
- Megan Ketch as Mandy
- Zabryna Guevara as Mrs. Phillips
- Susan Heyward as Jerusa
- Anne Carney as Mrs. Taggart
- Taliyah Whitaker as Shandra
- Sarah Jones as Herself
- Matthew Maher as Actor

== Release ==
The film premiered at the 2017 Sundance Film Festival on January 27, 2017. Prior to, Netflix acquired distribution rights to the film for more than $3 million and began streaming it on July 28, 2017.

== Reception ==
On review aggregator website Rotten Tomatoes, the film holds an approval rating of 89%, based on 61 reviews, and an average rating of 7.10/10. The website's critical consensus reads, "The Incredible Jessica James makes its standard storyline feel new, almost purely on the strength of a captivating, potentially star-making performance from Jessica Williams." On Metacritic, the film has a weighted average score of 72 out of 100, based on 15 critics, indicating "generally favorable reviews".
