= Plum Pictures =

American film production company

- Industry: Film production
- Founded: 2003; 23 years ago
- Founder: Galt Niederhoffer; Celine Rattray; Daniela Taplin Lundberg
- Defunct: 2009; 17 years ago
- Headquarters: New York City, New York, United States

Plum Pictures was an American independent film production company founded in 2003 by Galt Niederhoffer, Celine Rattray and Daniela Taplin Lundberg. Based in downtown Manhattan, the company produced up to five films a year, with a focus on both independent and studio films. Plum also financed up to two films a year.

The company's film Grace is Gone received two awards at the 2007 Sundance Film Festival, including the Audience Award and the Screenwriting Award.

== Films ==
- The Baxter (2005)
- Lonesome Jim (2005)
- The Ground Truth (2006)
- Return to Rajapur (2006)
- Dedication (2007)
- Grace is Gone (2007)
- Great World of Sound (2007)
- Raving (2007)
- Watching the Detectives (2007)
- Bart Got a Room (2008)
- Birds of America (2008)
- Diminished Capacity (2008)
- Trucker (2008)
- After.Life (2009)
