= Raving (film) =

2007 American short film by Julia Stiles

- Directed by: Julia Stiles
- Written by: Julia Stiles
- Starring: Bill Irwin; Zooey Deschanel
- Release date: 2007
- Country: United States

Raving is a 2007 American short film written and directed by Julia Stiles, produced by Plum Pictures, and starring Bill Irwin and Zooey Deschanel.

== Plot ==
In New York City, a man in a suit and tie has undisclosed problems: his corporate I.D. has expired and he's denied entrance to an office building. A young woman cadges money from strangers with an emotional story of losing her ride home and needing funds. One morning at a diner, he offers her a job. She accepts with an eye to anything of value in his flat. Then, his conversation turns to raving.

== Availability ==
The film is hosted on Elle Magazine's website.
