= The Baxter =

2005 film by Michael Showalter

- Directed by: Michael Showalter
- Written by: Michael Showalter
- Produced by: Reagan Silber; Galt Niederhoffer
- Starring: Michael Showalter; Elizabeth Banks; Michelle Williams; Justin Theroux
- Cinematography: Tim Orr
- Edited by: Jacob Craycroft; Sarah Flack
- Music by: Theodore Shapiro; Craig Wedren
- Production company: Plum Pictures
- Distributed by: IFC Films
- Release date: August 26, 2005
- Running time: 91 minutes
- Country: United States
- Language: English
- Box office: $181,872

The Baxter is a 2005 American comedy film written by, directed by and starring comedian Michael Showalter. A "Baxter", as defined by the film, is the nice, dull guy in a romantic comedy who is dumped at the end of the story for the protagonist.

Much light humor is made of showing Showalter as a "Baxter" in several typical romantic comedy clichés: being abandoned at the altar as a former love is claimed by her high school sweetheart, and being left in college at a pep rally for an underdog sports hero. The plot revolves around the life of Elliot Sherman during the two weeks before his wedding, as he doggedly fights off the curse of his former Baxter role in relationships.

IFC Films financed the film and produced it with Plum Pictures. They gave the film a very limited release; it had a U.S. box office gross of $181,872.

== Plot ==
Elliot, an average tax accountant from Brooklyn, feels doomed to be the "Baxter," the nice guy who's bound to lose the girl to the leading man in romantic comedies. Losing three girlfriends to last-minute rekindled relationships with their ex-boyfriends has made Elliot wary of being abandoned yet again.

About a week before his wedding to his girlfriend, Caroline Swann, Elliot discovers that her high school beau, Bradley, is back in town. Elliot tries to keep himself composed, but even Caroline's reassurances do not convince him that her feelings for Bradley are buried. In the meantime, Elliot meets Cecil, his temporary secretary at his accounting firm. As he resigns himself to losing Caroline to Bradley, Cecil offers him a ray of hope: she does not believe in "Baxters" and thinks that his predicament is avoidable.

The two meet up again later that night at a small club where Cecil performs her original songs, and Cecil tells Elliot he needs to take more risks. When Cecil fights with her unsupportive boyfriend Dan, Elliot offers to put her up for the night. The next morning, Caroline shows up early with their wedding planner to finalize their plans. Elliot panics due to Cecil's hidden presence and during the meeting, makes a string of awkward suggestions, upsetting Caroline, who begins to doubt his commitment to their relationship, to the point of calling off the wedding.

While out at a bar with his friends from work, Elliot accidentally runs into Dan, who recognizes him as Cecil's "Baxter" friend. Dan is there to meet with Sonya, who's Bradley's current girlfriend and Dan's old college friend. They all decide to sit together, much to Elliot's chagrin. Both Dan and Bradley laugh and joke with Elliot's friends until one of them mentions that Caroline left him. Depressed and upset, Elliot leaves and contemplates suicide but he's interrupted by Caroline's brother-in-law, Louis (David Wain), who tells him Caroline is willing to give their engagement another chance.

Elliot plans a romantic dinner with Caroline but finds her with an anguished Bradley, who just broke up with Sonya and is back flirting with Caroline. Caroline convinces Elliot to take Bradley out with them. They cancel Elliot's reservations to an expensive restaurant and go instead to a burger place that Bradley knows well. Elliot feels out of place and eventually calls Cecil from the back of the restaurant, confessing that he feels that his marriage will be over before it begins.

The next day, Elliot arrives at work to find that Cecil is his temp again. When she proposes to go have a drink together, Elliot explains that after his phone call, the night actually got better for him. As Caroline accused Elliot of being unromantic, he stood up for himself and accepted to go dance with her and Bradley, actually impressing Caroline with his moves. Bradley shows off his breakdance routines, accidentally hitting Elliot in the face, to Caroline's concerns. Bradley apologizes and reveals that he will leave the next morning to Malta for his work as a geode student.

Though happy for him, Cecil is saddened by the news because of her growing feelings for Elliot. She mentions that Dan is moving to Cincinnati and she's going to follow him there, to Elliot's discomfort.

At Caroline and Elliot's wedding, Bradley crashes the ceremony and declares his love for Caroline, a split second after Elliot was going to voice his own objection. Caroline finally gives in and kisses Bradley passionately in front of the whole church. Elliot takes off immediately to catch Cecil before she leaves town and finds her at her apartment right while Dan is leaving. Elliot declares his love for her and chases off an old friend of hers who suddenly shows up. Later, they perform together at the same club where they had their first date, with Cecil singing one of her songs and Elliot playing the piano to back her up.

In a mid-credits scene, Dan reflects in narration on his own status as a Baxter, having just lost the girl to the leading man.

== Cast ==
- Michael Showalter as Elliot Sherman
- Michelle Williams as Cecil Mills
- Elizabeth Banks as Caroline Swann
- Justin Theroux as Bradley Lake
- Michael Ian Black as Ed
- Zak Orth as Wendall Wimms
- Peter Dinklage as Benson Hedges
- Catherine Lloyd Burns as Stella
- Katharine Powell as Sonya Simmons
- Paul Rudd as Dan Abbott
- Haviland Morris as Kate Swann Lewis
- David Wain as Louis Lewis
- A. D. Miles as Bar Baxter #1
- Joe Lo Truglio as Bar Baxter #2
- Seth Herzog as Bar Baxter #3
- Jonathan Marc Sherman as Deaf Bar Baxter
- Leslie Lyles as Sheila Sherman
- Jim DeMarse as Leonard Sherman
- Jon DeVries as Alan Swann
- Donna Mitchell as Judy Swann
- Sarah Drew as Serena
- Ken Marino as Jack Mechanic
- Jack McBrayer as Elliot's Friend (uncredited)

== Reception ==
On review aggregator website Rotten Tomatoes, the film has an approval rating of 32% based on reviews from 75 critics, with an average score of 5.05/10. The website's critics consensus reads: "The Baxter is good-natured, but there are simply not enough laughs to fuel this comedy."

Roger Ebert gave the film two out of four stars and wrote: "The problem with The Baxter is right there at the center of the movie, and maybe it is unavoidable: Showalter makes too good of a baxter. He deserves to be dumped." John Anderson of Variety magazine wrote: "Showalter pushes too far: Nerdiness, after all, can be only so attractive."
