= I Love You, I Love You Not =

- Theatrical release poster
- Directed by: Billy Hopkins
- Screenplay by: Wendy Kesselman
- Based on: I Love You, I Love You Not by Wendy Kesselman
- Produced by: Mark Tarlov; John Fiedler; Joe Caracciolo Jr.
- Starring: Jeanne Moreau; Claire Danes; Jude Law
- Cinematography: Maryse Alberti
- Edited by: Paul Karasick; Jim Clark
- Music by: Gil Goldstein
- Production companies: Polar Entertainment; Die Hauskunst & Rimb; Chrysalis Films Intl.; Canal Plus; Filmstiftung North Rhine Westphalia
- Distributed by: Eurozoom (France); Avalanche Releasing (USA)
- Release dates: 28 April 1996 (France); 31 October 1997 (USA)
- Running time: 93 mins
- Countries: France; Germany; United States; United Kingdom
- Language: English

I Love You, I Love You Not is a 1996 American romantic drama film directed by Billy Hopkins and written by Wendy Kesselman, based on her 1982 play. The film is about the contrasted narratives of a teenaged Jewish girl in Nazi Germany and her granddaughter's first experience of love in contemporary New York City.

== Plot ==
The film is told through the stories of two women: Nana, a holocaust survivor, and Daisy, her granddaughter. The two have a strong bond as Daisy frequently stays with Nana when her parents leave town, and their shared bibliophilia.

Daisy tells Nana of her blossoming romance with a young man named Ethan, and her problems fitting in at school due to her shyness and Jewish heritage. Nana tells the story of her young life in World War II, when she was sent to a ghetto and subsequently a concentration camp, where her two younger sisters were killed.

After Daisy tells Ethan about Nana's time in the camp, she begins to receive anti-Semitic harassment at school. Ethan's friends mock him for dating Daisy, and when she won't have sex with him, he loses interest and breaks up with her.

Devastated, Daisy goes to see Nana and takes her anger out on her, decrying her Jewishness and upsetting Nana. Embarrassed at the hurt she has caused, she runs away and tries to kill herself by walking in front of a moving train, but Nana pulls her away at the last moment.

Nana tells Daisy not to be afraid of life or love; Daisy asks to stay, but knows she must go, and they promise to see each other again soon. While walking her dog, Daisy sees Ethan and his friends, but after looking at each other for several moments, Ethan leaves to be with his friends. She stands there, heartbroken and crying, but soon moves on; the final shot is of Daisy walking to camera, smiling.

== Cast ==
- Jeanne Moreau as Nana
- Claire Danes as Daisy/Young Nana
- Jude Law as Ethan
- James Van Der Beek as Tony
- Kris Park as Seth
- Lauren Fox as Alison
- Emily Burkes-Nossiter as Jessica
- Carrie Szlasa as Jane
- Julia Stiles as Young Nana's Friend
- Robert Sean Leonard as Angel of Death
- Frederick Neumann as School Principal
- Peter F. Hopkins as Mr. Douglas
- Jerry Tanklow as Mr. Gilman

== Reception ==
On Rotten Tomatoes, it has a 40% approval rating based on 5 reviews, with an average score of 5.4/10.

In a negative review for Variety, Lael Loewenstein lamented the missed opportunity for a portrait of anti-Semitism that "not even the presence of gifted thesps Jeanne Moreau and Claire Danes can save [...] from its descent into schmaltz." In a review for The New York Times, Janet Maslin criticized the film's sentimentality, the lack of sharp edge in the adaptation, and that "it treats the Holocaust as little more than a tacit self-help lesson for a wide-eyed teen-age girl."

Russell Smith of the Austin Chronicle wrote that the film was "artistically handicapped" from the outset, positing that screenwriter Kesselman had filled the script with "enough leaden symbolism and gratuitous schmaltz to seriously undermine the tale's potential impact," summarizing the film as maudlin and simplistic.

In a largely positive review for Film Journal International, Ed Kelleher called the film "modest but engaging," praising Danes and Moreau's performances, stating that the actresses were "separated by generations but allied by artistry."
