= E.J. Carroll (actor) =

American film and television actor (1960–2026)

- Carroll as Fat Mooney in The Deuce
- Born: May 21, 1960
- Died: November 19, 2026 (aged 66)
- Occupation: Actor
- Years active: 1998–2026

E.J. Carroll (May 21, 1960 – November 19, 2026) was an American film and television actor during a nearly three-decade screen career. He was best known for playing the recurring roles of Sheriff Victor Sickles on Boardwalk Empire and Fat Mooney on The Deuce (2017–2019).

== Life and career ==
Carroll was born on May 21, 1960. He made his on-screen debut in 1998 as a Officer Fenwick in Law & Order, and he would appear as other characters in three other episodes through 2004. He also had roles in two early-2000s episodes in Law & Order: Special Victims Unit and two more in Law & Order: Criminal Intent that decade.

Carroll starred as Sheriff Victor Sickles in two episodes of Terence Winter and Martin Scorsese's Boardwalk Empire. Another of the actor's most recognizable roles was as Fat Mooney in HBO's The Deuce, where his character ran a sex shop owned by Frankie Martino (James Franco).

He also voiced a character in Grand Theft Auto V in 2013 and played Dr. Scott in the concert version of The Rocky Horror Show, titled The Rocky Horror Tribute Show.

As a guest star, Carroll appeared on television programs such as The Blacklist, Blue Bloods, High Maintenance, Pose, and The Punisher.

Carroll's film credit roles included Darren Aronofsky's The Wrestler and Kirk Jones' Everybody's Fine, as well as The Cake Eaters, The Winning Season, and The Hungry Ghosts.

=== Death ===
Carroll died on November 19, 2026, at the age of 66.

== Filmography ==
=== Film ===
Year	Title	Role	Notes
2001	Pipe Dream	Tow Guy	
2003	Crooked Lines	Ray	
2006	The Night Listener	Hospital Security Guard	
2007	The Cake Eaters	Vito	
2008	The Wrestler	Teamster at Deli Counter	
2008	Capers	Tall Goon	
2009	The Winning Season	Male Announcer	
2009	The Hungry Ghosts	Eddie	
2009	Last Day of Summer	Ken	
2009	Everybody's Fine	Wine Man (as EJ Carroll)	
2012	Sunburn	Boombox	Short film
2013	A Fish Story	Bob Gordon	
2015	Her Composition	Vice Branch Manager	
2016	Visit 57	Security Guard	Short film
2017	Police State	Fat Santa	
2020	Minor Premise	Dr. Lang	
2020	Want This	Professor	Short film
2026	The Mayflower	Stalker	
TBA	Triumph of the Will	Paulie	Post-production
TBA	The Wretched Devours	Jonas	Post-production
TBA	A Delicate Arrangement	Charlie	Completed

=== Television ===
Year	Title	Role	Notes
1998–2004	Law & Order	Officer Fenwick / Kevin Braken / Vince Ellis / Others	4 episodes
2001–2002	Law & Order: Special Victims Unit	Sketch Artist / Ronnie	2 episodes
2003–2006	Law & Order: Criminal Intent	Jerome / Desmond McCarthy	2 episodes
2006	Conviction	Al Stultz	1 episode
2010	Superego	Patient	Television film
2012	Damages	Court Reporter #2	1 episode
2012	Boardwalk Empire	Sheriff Victor Sickles	2 episodes
2013	Blue Bloods	Bernard Goodwin	1 episode
2013–2014	The Heart, She Holler	Grub Grubman / Grub	5 episodes
2014	The Blacklist	Bernard Babbitt	1 episode
2015	Neon Joe, Werewolf Hunter	Earl T.	2 episodes
2016	One Night Only: Lights Out	Fergus	Television film
2016	High Maintenance	Carl	1 episode
2017–2019	The Deuce	Fat Mooney	6 episodes
2018	Pose	Danny	1 episode
2019	The Punisher	Doctor Charles	1 episode
2019	Happy!	Jelly	1 episode; uncredited

=== Video games ===
Year	Title	Role	Notes
2008	Need for Speed: Undercover	Secondary #2	
2013	Grand Theft Auto V	The Local Population	Voice role

=== Podcasts ===
Year	Title	Role	Notes
2021	The Lamb	Eric / Duncan	3 episodes
2022	Past My Bedtime	Additional Voice	
