= Dedication (film) =

- Theatrical release poster
- Directed by: Justin Theroux
- Written by: David Bromberg
- Produced by: Justin Theroux; Celine Rattray
- Starring: Billy Crudup; Mandy Moore; Tom Wilkinson
- Cinematography: Stephen Kazmierski
- Edited by: Andy Keir
- Music by: Ed Shearmur
- Production company: Plum Pictures
- Distributed by: The Weinstein Company; First Look Pictures
- Release dates: January 22, 2007 (Sundance); August 24, 2007 (United States)
- Running time: 95 minutes
- Country: United States
- Language: English
- Box office: $250,182

Dedication is a 2007 American comedy-drama film directed by Justin Theroux (in his feature directorial debut), written by David Bromberg, and stars Billy Crudup and Mandy Moore. The film premiered at the 2007 Sundance Film Festival. It was produced by Plum Pictures.

== Plot ==
Henry Roth is an obsessive-compulsive and somewhat misanthropic writer of children's books. His illustrator and only friend Rudy dies after a fabulously successful collaboration on their series of children's books about "Marty the Beaver". Henry is under contract to produce another "Marty the Beaver" book for Christmas sales. His publisher, Arthur Planck, assigns penniless, lovelorn illustrator Lucy Reilly to work with Henry. She's being wooed by her ex-boyfriend Jeremy, who dumped her two years ago but shows up apologetic, having dedicated his new book to her. Lucy and Henry go to their publisher's beach house to work on the book. Will love bloom amid the rocks, or is Henry a bump on Lucy's road to Jeremy? Rudy's voice, from the grave, gives Henry counsel.

== Cast ==
- Billy Crudup as Henry Roth
- Mandy Moore as Lucy Reilly
- Tom Wilkinson as Rudy Holt
- Christine Taylor as Allison
- Bob Balaban as Arthur Planck
- Catherine Lloyd Burns as Mother in Bookstore
- Amy Sedaris as Cassidy's Mom
- Cassidy Hinkle as Cassidy
- Jeremy Shamos as Matthew
- Christopher Fitzgerald as Robin
- Dianne Wiest as Carol
- Jicky Schnee as Mandy the Waitress
- John Ellison Conlee as Man at Lucy's Apartment
- Martin Freeman as Jeremy
- Christopher Grey Misa as Abused Kid
- Catherine Kellner as Abusive Mom
- Bobby Cannavale as Don Meyers
- Peter Bogdanovich as Roger Spade
- Justin Theroux as Lawyer on phone

== Production ==
Dedication was filmed in New York City, Wantagh, and Glen Cove. Adult film actor Erik Rhodes filmed a cameo role for the film but his scenes were ultimately edited out.

== Release ==
The film premiered at the 2007 Sundance Film Festival. It was given a limited theatrical release on August 24, 2007, in 4 theaters. The film grossed a domestic total of $92,853 from 8 theaters.

=== Critical response ===
The film received mixed reviews from critics. The film holds a 40% approval rating on the review aggregator Rotten Tomatoes, based on 45 reviews with an average rating of 5.18/10. The website's critics consensus reads: "Mandy Moore and Billy Crudup's lack of chemistry in Dedication makes it hard to maintain interest in this confused love story." Metacritic reported the film had an average score of 50 out of 100, based on 19 reviews.

== Home media ==
The film was released on DVD on February 12, 2008.
