= Galt Niederhoffer =

American novelist

- Born: October 2, 1976 (age 49)
- Education: Chapin School; Milton Academy; Harvard University
- Occupations: Producer; director; novelist

Galt Niederhoffer (born October 2, 1976) is an American producer, director and novelist. She has produced over thirty feature films.

Her movie credits as a producer include: Infinitely Polar Bear (2013); Robot & Frank (2012), winner of the Alfred P. Sloan Feature Film Prize at Sundance; Grace Is Gone (2007), winner of the Audience Award and Waldo Salt Screenwriting Award at Sundance; Lonesome Jim (2005), nominated for the Grand Jury Prize at Sundance; Prozac Nation (2001) (of which she was also the screenwriter), an adaptation of the best-selling novel; and Hurricane Streets (1997), winner of the awards for Audience, Best Director and Best Cinematography at Sundance (the first feature film to win three awards at the festival).

She has published four novels. Her first novel, A Taxonomy of Barnacles (2005), about the love and rivalry of six sisters, was loosely based on her family, including her father, the idiosyncratic and highly acclaimed squash champion, economist and hedge fund manager Victor Niederhoffer, and her five sisters. The book's surprise ending was mirrored in real life when her father had a seventh child, a son, a year after the book came out.

Her second novel, The Romantics (2008), about college classmates who get together for a wedding six years after graduation, where they compare their meager progress towards life's important goals and rekindle previous rivalries. Niederhoffer adapted The Romantics into a movie in 2010, which she also directed. The movies starred Katie Holmes, Anna Paquin, Malin Akerman, Josh Duhamel, Adam Brody, Jeremy Strong and Elijah Wood.

Her third novel, Love and Happiness, about a married couple whose seemingly idyllic lives in Brownstone Brooklyn has become mundane, was released in September 2013. Her fourth novel, Poison, was published in November 2017.

Niederhoffer attended the Chapin School, Milton Academy and Harvard University.

== Filmography ==
- Hurricane Streets (1997)
- Prozac Nation (2001)
- Lonesome Jim (2005)
- The Baxter (2005)
- Grace Is Gone (2006)
- Dedication (2007)
- Watching the Detectives (2007)
- Diminished Capacity (2008)
- Birds of America (2008)
- The Romantics (2010)
- Robot & Frank (2012)
- Black Nativity (2013)
- Infinitely Polar Bear (2014)

== Bibliography ==
- A Taxonomy of Barnacles (2005)
- The Romantics (2008)
- Love and Happiness (2013)
- Poison (2017)
