= Lists of The Twilight Zone episodes =

There have been four versions of the anthology television series The Twilight Zone. Each has its own episode list:

- List of The Twilight Zone (1959 TV series) episodes
- List of The Twilight Zone (1985 TV series) episodes
- List of The Twilight Zone (2002 TV series) episodes
- List of The Twilight Zone (2019 TV series) episodes
