= List of American films of 2007 =

This is a list of American films released in 2007.

== Box office ==
The highest-grossing American films released in 2007, by domestic box office gross revenue, are as follows:

Highest-grossing films of 2007
Rank	Title	Distributor	Domestic gross
1	Spider-Man 3	Sony	$336,530,303
2	Shrek the Third	Paramount	$322,719,944
3	Transformers	Paramount	$319,246,193
4	Pirates of the Caribbean: At World's End	Disney	$309,420,425
5	Harry Potter and the Order of the Phoenix	Warner Bros.	$292,004,738
6	I Am Legend	Warner Bros.	$277,322,503
7	The Bourne Ultimatum	Universal	$227,471,070
8	National Treasure: Book of Secrets	Disney	$219,964,115
9	Alvin and the Chipmunks	20th Century Fox	$217,326,974
10	300	Warner Bros.	$210,614,939

== January–March ==
Opening		Title	Production company	Cast and crew	Ref.
J A N U A R Y	5	Code Name: The Cleaner	New Line Cinema	Les Mayfield (director); Robert Adetuyi, George Gallo (screenplay); Cedric the Entertainer, Lucy Liu, Nicollette Sheridan, DeRay Davis, Tom Butler, Mark Dacascos, Callum Keith Rennie, Niecy Nash, Will Patton, Kevin McNulty, Beau Davis, Bart Anderson, Robert Clarke	
J A N U A R Y	5	Freedom Writers	Paramount Pictures / MTV Films	Richard LaGravenese (director/screenplay); Hilary Swank, Patrick Dempsey, Scott Glenn, Imelda Staunton, April Lee Hernández, Mario, John Benjamin Hickey, Kristin Herrera, Gabriel Chavarria, Hunter Parrish, Giovonnie Samuels, Robert Ray Wisdom, Pat Carroll, Angela Alvarado, Jason Finn, Will Morales, Vanetta Smith, Antonio Garcia, Jaclyn Ngan, Deance Wyatt, Sergio Montalvo, Armand Jones, Ricardo Moline, Angela Sargeant	
J A N U A R Y	5	Happily N'Ever After	Lionsgate / Vanguard Animation	Paul J. Bolger (director); Rob Moreland (screenplay); Sarah Michelle Gellar, Freddie Prinze Jr., Andy Dick, Wallace Shawn, Patrick Warburton, George Carlin, Sigourney Weaver, Michael McShane, John DiMaggio, Tom Kenny, Rob Paulsen, Phil Proctor, Kath Soucie, Jill Talley, Tress MacNeille, Jon Polito, Lee Arenberg, Bob Bergen, John Cygan, Jennifer Darling, Debi Derryberry, Patti Deutsch, Shae D'lyn, Bill Farmer, Jack Fletcher, Roger L. Jackson, Sherry Lynn, Laraine Newman, Jan Rabson, Kevin Michael Richardson, Jim Ward, April Winchell, Lisa Kaplan	
J A N U A R Y	5	Three	Fox Faith / The Bigger Picture	Robby Henson (director); Alan B. McElroy (screenplay); Marc Blucas, Justine Waddell, Laura Jordan, Bill Moseley, Priscilla Barnes, Kevin Downes, Max Ryan, Tom Bower, Jeffrey Lee Hollis	
J A N U A R Y	10	Murder Party	Magnolia Pictures	Jeremy Saulnier (director/screenplay); Chris Sharp, Sandy Barnett, Macon Blair, Paul Goldblatt, William Lacey, Stacy Rock	
J A N U A R Y	12	Alpha Dog	Universal Pictures / Sidney Kimmel Entertainment / A-Mark Entertainment	Nick Cassavetes (director/screenplay); Emile Hirsch, Justin Timberlake, Anton Yelchin, Ben Foster, Shawn Hatosy, Bruce Willis, Sharon Stone, Chris Marquette, Dominique Swain, Alex Solowitz, Fernando Vargas, Olivia Wilde, Amanda Seyfried, Vincent Kartheiser, Lukas Haas, Heather Wahlquist, Harry Dean Stanton, David Thornton, Charity Shea, Holt McCallany, Amber Heard	
J A N U A R Y	12	Arthur and the Invisibles	Metro-Goldwyn-Mayer / The Weinstein Company	Luc Besson (director/screenplay); Céline Garcia (screenplay); Robert De Niro, Madonna, Snoop Dogg, David Bowie, Freddie Highmore, Harvey Keitel, Anthony Anderson, Chazz Palminteri, Jason Bateman, Jimmy Fallon, Mia Farrow, Ron Crawford, Adam LeFevre, Penny Balfour, Erik Per Sullivan, Emilio Estevez, Rob Corddry, Nate Corddry, David Suchet, Douglas Rand, Jean Betote Njamba, Allen Hoist	
J A N U A R Y	12	Primeval	Hollywood Pictures	Michael Katleman (director); John Brancato and Michael Ferris (screenplay); Dominic Purcell, Orlando Jones, Brooke Langton, Jürgen Prochnow, Gideon Emery, Gabriel Malema, Dumisani Mbebe, Patrick Lyster, Linda Mpondo, Ernest Ndhlovu, Thandi Nugbani, Kgmotoso Motlosi, Walter Emanuel Jones	
J A N U A R Y	12	Stomp the Yard	Screen Gems / Rainforest Films	Sylvain White (director); Robert Adetuyi, Gregory Anderson (screenplay); Columbus Short, Meagan Good, Ne-Yo, Chris Brown, Darrin Henson, Brian J. White, Laz Alonso, Harry J. Lennix, Valarie Pettiford, April Clark, Jermaine Williams, Allan Louis, Chuck Maldonado	
J A N U A R Y	17	Alone with Her	IFC Films	Eric Nicholas (director/screenplay); Colin Hanks, Ana Claudia Talancón, Jordana Spiro	
J A N U A R Y	19	The Hitcher	Rogue Pictures / Platinum Dunes / Intrepid Pictures	Dave Meyers (director); Eric Bernt, Eric Red, Jake Wade Wall (screenplay); Sean Bean, Sophia Bush, Zachary Knighton, Neal McDonough, Skip O'Brien, Travis Schuldt, Danny Bolero, Lauren Cohn, Yara Martinez	
J A N U A R Y	26	Blood & Chocolate	Metro-Goldwyn-Mayer / Lakeshore Entertainment	Katja von Garnier (director); Ehren Kruger, Christopher B. Landon (screenplay); Agnes Bruckner, Hugh Dancy, Olivier Martinez, Bryan Dick, Katja Riemann, Chris Geere, Tom Harper, John Kerr, Kata Dobó, Maria Dinulescu, Jack Wilson, Vitalie Ursu, Bogdan Voda	
J A N U A R Y	26	Catch and Release	Columbia Pictures / Relativity Media	Susannah Grant (director/screenplay); Jennifer Garner, Timothy Olyphant, Sam Jaeger, Kevin Smith, Fiona Shaw, Juliette Lewis, Tina Lifford	
J A N U A R Y	26	Epic Movie	20th Century Fox / Regency Enterprises	Jason Friedberg and Aaron Seltzer (directors/screenplay); Kal Penn, Adam Campbell, Jennifer Coolidge, Jayma Mays, Faune A. Chambers, Crispin Glover, Tony Cox, Hector Jimenez, Jareb Dauplaise, Darrell Hammond, Carmen Electra, Jim Piddock, Kevin Hart, Fred Willard, David Carradine, Katt Williams, Danny Jacobs, Gregory Jbara, Kevin McDonald, Crista Flanagan, Lauren Conrad, Vince Vieluf, Lindsey Kraft, Scott L. Schwartz, Roscoe Lee Browne, Tad Hilgenbrink, Audra Lynn, Rico Rodriguez, Jack Cortes, Nick Steele, David Lehre, George Alvarez, Alla Petrou, James Walker Sr., Abe Spigner, Anwar Burton, Darko Belgrade, Dane Farwell, Kahshanna Evans, Heather Storm, Shawn McDonald	
J A N U A R Y	26	Seraphim Falls	Destination Films / Samuel Goldwyn Films	David Von Ancken (director/screenplay); Abby Everett Jaques (screenplay); Liam Neeson, Pierce Brosnan, Michael Wincott, Xander Berkeley, Tom Noonan, Kevin J. O'Connor, John Robinson, Anjelica Huston, Angie Harmon, Ed Lauter, Robert Baker, Wes Studi, Jimmi Simpson, James Jordan, Nate Mooney, Shannon Zeller, Adon Cravens	
J A N U A R Y	26	Smokin' Aces	Universal Pictures / Working Title Films	Joe Carnahan (director/screenplay); Ben Affleck, Jason Bateman, Common, Andy García, Alicia Keys, Ray Liotta, Jeremy Piven, Ryan Reynolds, Peter Berg, Chris Pine, Tommy Flanagan, Joseph Ruskin, Taraji P. Henson, Néstor Carbonell, Kevin Durand, Maury Sterling, Vladimir Kulich, Martin Henderson, Joel Edgerton, Christopher Michael Holley, Matthew Fox, Wayne Newton, Joe Carnahan	
F E B R U A R Y	2	Because I Said So	Universal Pictures / Gold Circle Films	Michael Lehmann (director); Karen Leigh Hopkins, Jessie Nelson (screenplay); Diane Keaton, Mandy Moore, Gabriel Macht, Tom Everett Scott, Lauren Graham, Piper Perabo, Stephen Collins, Ty Panitz, Colin Ferguson, Matt Champagne, Zachary Gordon	
F E B R U A R Y	2	Factory Girl	Metro-Goldwyn-Mayer / The Weinstein Company	George Hickenlooper (director); Captain Mauzner (screenplay); Sienna Miller, Guy Pearce, Hayden Christensen, Jimmy Fallon, Mena Suvari, Shawn Hatosy, Jack Huston, Tara Summers, Beth Grant, James Naughton, Edward Herrmann, Mary-Kate Olsen, Illeana Douglas, Mary Elizabeth Winstead, Don Novello, Johnny Whitworth, Brian Bell, Patrick Wilson, Michael Stephens, Samantha Maloney, Meredith Ostrom, Grant James, Peggy Walton-Walker, Colleen Camp, Joel Michaely, Georgina Chapman, George Plimpton, Gerard Malanga, Nat Finkelstein, Cary Elwes, George Hickenlooper, Sally Kirkland	
F E B R U A R Y	2	The Messengers	Screen Gems / Ghost House Pictures / Columbia Pictures	Pang Brothers (director); Mark Wheaton (screenplay); Kristen Stewart, Dylan McDermott, Penelope Ann Miller, John Corbett, Evan and Theodore Turner, William B. Davis, Brent Briscoe, Dustin Milligan, Jodelle Ferland, Tatiana Maslany, Shirley McQueen, Kieria Robinson, Michael Daingerfield	
F E B R U A R Y	2	The Situation	Shadow Distribution	Philip Haas (director); Wendell Steavenson (screenplay); Connie Nielsen, Damian Lewis, Mido Hamada, Driss Roukhe, Omar Berdouni, Shaun Evans, Tom McCarthy, John Slattery, Peter Eyre, Sean Gullette, Nasser Memarzia, Saïd Amadis, Chérine Amar, Fatiha Watili, Hamid Basket, Jace Newton	
F E B R U A R Y	6	Cinderella III: A Twist in Time	Walt Disney Home Entertainment / Disneytoon Studios	Frank Nissen (director); Dan Berendsen, Margaret Heidenry, Colleen Ventimilia, Eddie Guzelian (screenplay); Jennifer Hale, Christopher Daniel Barnes, Susanne Blakeslee, Tress MacNeille, Russi Taylor, Andre Stojka, Holland Taylor, Rob Paulsen, Corey Burton, Frank Welker, Jeff Bennett, Tami Tappan	
F E B R U A R Y	9	Hannibal Rising	The Weinstein Company / Metro-Goldwyn-Mayer / Dino De Laurentiis Company	Peter Webber (director); Thomas Harris (screenplay); Gaspard Ulliel, Gong Li, Rhys Ifans, Dominic West, Kevin McKidd, Richard Brake, Stephen Walters, Ingeborga Dapkūnaitė, Pavel Bezdek, Goran Kostić, Robbie Kay, Denis Ménochet, Helena-Lia Tachovska, Ivan Marevich, Charles Maquignon, Beata Ben Ammar	
F E B R U A R Y	9	Norbit	DreamWorks Pictures	Brian Robbins (director); Eddie Murphy, Charlie Murphy, Jay Scherick, David Ronn (screenplay); Eddie Murphy, Thandie Newton, Cuba Gooding Jr., Eddie Griffin, Terry Crews, Charlie Murphy, Katt Williams, Marlon Wayans, Clifton Powell, Lester "Rasta" Speight, Pat Crawford Brown, Jeanette Miller, Michael Colyar, Richard Gant, Marianne Muellerleile, Kristen Schaal, John Gatins, Smith Cho, Khamani Griffin, Anthony Russell, Alexis Rhee, Tone Man	
F E B R U A R Y	10	Pumpkinhead: Blood Feud	Castel Film Romania / MPCA	Michael Hurst (director); Amy Manson, Lance Henriksen	
F E B R U A R Y	14	Daddy's Little Girls	Lionsgate / Tyler Perry Studios	Tyler Perry (director/screenplay); Gabrielle Union, Idris Elba, Louis Gossett Jr., Tracee Ellis Ross, Terri J. Vaughn, Malinda Williams, Tyler Perry, Tasha Smith, Gary Sturgis, Cassi Davis, Sierra Aylina McClain, Lauryn Alisa McClain, China Anne McClain, Juanita Jennings, LaVan Davis, Brian J. White, Craig Robinson, Bishop Eddie Long	
F E B R U A R Y	14	Music and Lyrics	Warner Bros. Pictures / Castle Rock Entertainment / Village Roadshow Pictures	Marc Lawrence (director/screenplay); Hugh Grant, Drew Barrymore, Brad Garrett, Kristen Johnston, Campbell Scott, Haley Bennett, Scott Porter, Matthew Morrison, Zak Orth, Aasif Mandvi, Jason Antoon	
F E B R U A R Y	14	Starter for 10	BBC Films	Tom Vaughan (director); David Nicholls (screenplay); James McAvoy, Rebecca Hall, Dominic Cooper, Catherine Tate, Alice Eve, Benedict Cumberbatch, James Corden, Mark Gatiss, Charles Dance, Simon Woods, Elaine Tan, Lindsay Duncan, James Gaddas, John Henshaw, Ben Willbond	
F E B R U A R Y	16	Breach	Universal Pictures / Sidney Kimmel Entertainment	Billy Ray (director/screenplay); Adam Mazer, William Rotko (screenplay); Chris Cooper, Ryan Phillippe, Laura Linney, Dennis Haysbert, Caroline Dhavernas, Gary Cole, Bruce Davison, Kathleen Quinlan	
F E B R U A R Y	16	Bridge to Terabithia	Walt Disney Pictures / Walden Media	Gábor Csupó (director); David L. Paterson, Jeff Stockwell (screenplay); Josh Hutcherson, AnnaSophia Robb, Zooey Deschanel, Robert Patrick, Latham Gaines, Bailee Madison, James Gaylyn, Kate Butler, Judy McIntosh, Lauren Clinton, Cameron Wakefield, Elliot Lawless, Isabelle Kircher, Carly Owen, Patricia Aldersley, Jen Wolfe, Phil Grieve, Ian Harcourt, Devon Wood, Emma Fenton, Grace Brannigan, Paddy	
F E B R U A R Y	16	Ghost Rider	Columbia Pictures / Crystal Sky Pictures / Relativity Media / Marvel Entertainment	Mark Steven Johnson (director/screenplay); Nicolas Cage, Eva Mendes, Wes Bentley, Sam Elliott, Peter Fonda, Donal Logue, Brett Cullen, David Roberts, Laurence Breuls, Daniel Frederiksen, Mathew Wilkinson, Rebel Wilson, Matt Long, Raquel Alessi	
F E B R U A R Y	23	Amazing Grace	Samuel Goldwyn Films	Michael Apted (director); Steven Knight (screenplay); Ioan Gruffudd, Romola Garai, Youssou N'Dour, Albert Finney, Benedict Cumberbatch, Michael Gambon, Rufus Sewell, Ciarán Hinds, Toby Jones, Nicholas Farrell, Sylvestra Le Touzel, Jeremy Swift, Stephen Campbell Moore, Bill Paterson, Nicholas Day, Georgie Glen	
F E B R U A R Y	23	The Astronaut Farmer	Warner Bros. Pictures	Michael Polish (director/screenplay); Mark Polish (screenplay); Billy Bob Thornton, Virginia Madsen, Bruce Dern, Tim Blake Nelson, Max Thieriot, Jon Gries, Bruce Willis, Mark Polish, J. K. Simmons, Kiersten Warren, Rick Overton, Richard Edson, Julie White, Graham Beckel, Jay Leno, Marshall Bell, Jasper Polish, Logan Polish, Sal Lopez, Elise Eberle, Kathleen Arc	
F E B R U A R Y	23	The Number 23	New Line Cinema	Joel Schumacher (director); Fernley Phillips (screenplay); Jim Carrey, Virginia Madsen, Danny Huston, Logan Lerman, Lynn Collins, Rhona Mitra, Bud Cort, Mark Pellegrino, Michelle Arthur, Ed Lauter, Corey Stoll, Paul Butcher, Chris Lajoie	
F E B R U A R Y	23	Reno 911!: Miami	20th Century Fox / Paramount Pictures / Comedy Central Films	Robert Ben Garant (director/screenplay); Thomas Lennon, Kerri Kenney-Silver (screenplay); Carlos Alazraqui, Mary Birdsong, Robert Ben Garant, Kerri Kenney-Silver, Thomas Lennon, Wendi McLendon-Covey, Niecy Nash, Cedric Yarbrough, Nick Swardson, Michael Ian Black, David Koechner, Patton Oswalt, Danny DeVito, Dwayne Johnson, Paul Rudd, Paul Reubens, J. P. Manoux, Marisa Petroro	
M A R C H	2	Black Snake Moan	Paramount Vantage	Craig Brewer (director/screenplay); Samuel L. Jackson, Christina Ricci, Justin Timberlake, S. Epatha Merkerson, David Banner, Kim Richards, Son House, Michael Raymond-James, Adriane Lenox, Jeff Pope, Clare Grant, John Cothran Jr., Leonard L. Thomas, Neimus K. Williams, Charles "Skip" Pitts	
M A R C H	2	Wild Hogs	Touchstone Pictures	Walt Becker (director); Brad Copeland (screenplay); Tim Allen, John Travolta, Martin Lawrence, William H. Macy, Ray Liotta, Marisa Tomei, Jill Hennessy, Kevin Durand, M. C. Gainey, Dominic Janes, Tichina Arnold, Stephen Tobolowsky, Jason Sklar, Randy Sklar, John C. McGinley, Peter Fonda	
M A R C H	2	Zodiac	Paramount Pictures / Warner Bros. Pictures	David Fincher (director); James Vanderbilt (screenplay); Jake Gyllenhaal, Mark Ruffalo, Robert Downey Jr., Anthony Edwards, Brian Cox, Elias Koteas, Dermot Mulroney, John Carroll Lynch, Donal Logue, Philip Baker Hall, Chloë Sevigny, Adam Goldberg, Charles Fleischer, Zach Grenier, Clea DuVall, Paul Schulze, Pell James, John Terry, June Diane Raphael, Tom Verica, Lee Norris, Jimmi Simpson, Joel Bissonnette, James LeGros, Matt Winston, Jules Bruff, John Ennis, John Hemphill, Ione Skye, Bob Stephenson, John Getz, Ed Setrakian, Candy Clark, David Lee Smith, Jason Wiles, John Mahon, Thomas Kopache, Barry Livingston, Christopher John Fields, Anna Katarina	
M A R C H	9	300	Warner Bros. Pictures / Legendary Pictures / Virtual Studios / Atmosphere Pictures / Cruel and Unusual Films	Zack Snyder (director/screenplay); Kurt Johnstad, Michael B. Gordon (screenplay); Gerard Butler, Lena Headey, David Wenham, Dominic West, Vincent Regan, Michael Fassbender, Tom Wisdom, Andrew Pleavin, Andrew Tiernan, Rodrigo Santoro, Stephen McHattie, Peter Mensah, Kelly Craig, Robert Maillet, Patrick Sabongui, Tyrone Benskin, Tyler Neitzel, Giovanni Cimmino, Leon Laderach	
M A R C H	9	The Ultimate Gift	Fox Faith	Michael O. Sajbel (director); Cheryl McKay (screenplay); Abigail Breslin, Drew Fuller, James Garner, Brian Dennehy, Ali Hillis, Bill Cobbs	
M A R C H	9	The Namesake	Fox Searchlight Pictures / UTV Motion Pictures	Mira Nair (director); Sooni Taraporevala (screenplay); Kal Penn, Tabu, Irrfan Khan, Jacinda Barrett, Sebastian Roché, Linus Roache, Glenne Headly, Zuleikha Robinson, Ruma Guha Thakurta, Sabyasachi Chakrabarty, Supriya Devi, Tanushree Shankar, Jhumpa Lahiri, Samrat Chakrabarti, Partha Chatterjee, Naeem Mohaiemen, Jagannath Guha, Sukanya Chakraborty, Tamal Roy Choudhury	
M A R C H	9	Miss Potter	Metro-Goldwyn-Mayer / The Weinstein Company / Phoenix Pictures	Chris Noonan (director); Richard Maltby Jr. (screenplay); Renée Zellweger, Ewan McGregor, Emily Watson, Bill Paterson, Barbara Flynn, Lloyd Owen, Anton Lesser, David Bamber, Phyllida Law, Lucy Boynton, Justin McDonald, Judith Barker, Lynn Farleigh, John Woodvine, Jane How, Geoffrey Beevers, Clare Clifford, Sarah Crowden, Matyelok Gibbs, Oliver Jenkins, Christopher Middleton, Richard Mulholland	
M A R C H	10	Life Support	HBO Films	Nelson George (director/screenplay); Jim McKay, Hannah Weyer (screenplay); Queen Latifah, Wendell Pierce, Evan Ross, Anna Deavere Smith, Tracee Ellis Ross, Gloria Reuben, Tony Rock, Darrin Dewitt Henson, Carlo Alban, Brandon Scott, Chyna Layne, Rachel Nicks, Sidné Anderson, Andrea Williams	
M A R C H	11	1 More Hit	Gravitas Ventures	Shauna Garr (director); J-Swift, Akon, Twink Caplan, Shauna Garr, Paul Mooney	
M A R C H	16	Dead Silence	Universal Pictures	James Wan (director); Leigh Whannell (screenplay); Ryan Kwanten, Amber Valletta, Donnie Wahlberg, Bob Gunton, Judith Roberts, Michael Fairman, Laura Regan, Dmitry Chepovetsky, Keir Gilchrist, Enn Reitel, Fred Tatasciore, Joan Heney, Shelley Peterson, Steven Taylor	
M A R C H	16	I Think I Love My Wife	Fox Searchlight Pictures / UTV Motion Pictures	Chris Rock (director/screenplay); Louis C.K. (screenplay); Chris Rock, Kerry Washington, Gina Torres, Steve Buscemi, Edward Herrmann, Michael Kenneth Williams, Orlando Jones, Stephen A. Smith, Wendell Pierce, Roz Ryan, Christina Vidal, Eliza Coupe, GQ, Welker White, Samantha Ivers, Cassandra Freeman, Milan Howard	
M A R C H	16	Premonition	TriStar Pictures / Metro-Goldwyn-Mayer / Hyde Park Entertainment	Mennan Yapo (director); Bill Kelly (screenplay); Sandra Bullock, Julian McMahon, Nia Long, Kate Nelligan, Amber Valletta, Peter Stormare, Marc Macaulay, Jude Ciccolella, Seamus Davey-Fitzpatrick, Mark Famiglietti, Courtney Taylor Burness, Shyann McClure, Marcus Lyle Brown	
M A R C H	23	The Hills Have Eyes 2	Fox Atomic	Martin Weisz (director); Wes Craven, Jonathan Craven (screenplay); Jessica Stroup, Michael McMillian, Jacob Vargas, Flex Alexander, Lee Thompson Young, Daniella Alonso, Eric Edelstein, Reshad Strik, Michael Bailey Smith, Derek Mears, Jeff Kober, Jay Acovone, Archie Kao, Ben Crowley, David Reynolds, Philip Pavel, Tyrell Kemlo, Gáspár Szabó, Jason Oettle, Jeremy Goei	
M A R C H	23	The Last Mimzy	New Line Cinema	Robert Shaye (director); Bruce Joel Rubin, Toby Emmerich, James V. Hart, Carol Skilken (screenplay); Joely Richardson, Timothy Hutton, Michael Clarke Duncan, Rainn Wilson, Chris O'Neil, Rhiannon Leigh Wryn, Kathryn Hahn, Patrick Gilmore, Kirsten Williamson, Marc Musso, Megan McKinnon, Chris Sipe, Irene Snow, Mackenzie Hamilton, Calum Worthy, Brian Greene	
M A R C H	23	Pride	Lionsgate	Sunu Gonera (director); Kevin Michael Smith, Michael Gozzard, J. Mills Goodloe (screenplay); Terrence Howard, Bernie Mac, Kimberly Elise, Tom Arnold, Evan Ross, Alphonso McAuley, Regine Nehy, Scott Thompson, Nate Parker, Kevin Phillips, Gary Sturgis, Brandon Fobbs	
M A R C H	23	Reign Over Me	Columbia Pictures / Relativity Media / Madison 23 Productions / Sunlight Productions	Mike Binder (director/screenplay); Adam Sandler, Don Cheadle, Jada Pinkett Smith, Liv Tyler, Saffron Burrows, Donald Sutherland, Robert Klein, Melinda Dillon, Mike Binder, Jonathan Banks, John de Lancie, Rae Allen, Paula Newsome, Ted Raimi, B. J. Novak	
M A R C H	23	Shooter	Paramount Pictures	Antoine Fuqua (director); Jonathan Lemkin (screenplay); Mark Wahlberg, Michael Peña, Danny Glover, Kate Mara, Elias Koteas, Rhona Mitra, Rade Šerbedžija, Ned Beatty, Tate Donovan, Justin Louis, Jonathan Walker, Lane Garrison, Brian Markinson, Levon Helm, Mike Dopud, Alan C. Peterson, Paul Alexander Warren, Dean McKenzie	
M A R C H	23	TMNT	Warner Bros. Pictures / The Weinstein Company / Imagi Animation Studios	Kevin Munroe (director/writer); Thomas K. Gray, Galen Walker, Paul Wang (screenplay); Chris Evans, Sarah Michelle Gellar, Mako, Kevin Smith, Patrick Stewart, Ziyi Zhang, Laurence Fishburne, Nolan North, James Arnold Taylor, Mitchell Whitfield, Mikey Kelley, John DiMaggio, Fred Tatasciore, Paula Mattioli, Kevin Michael Richardson, Greg Baldwin, Dee Bradley Baker, Jeff Bennett, Jim Cummings, Grey DeLisle, Chris Edgerly, Kim Mae Guest, Jennifer Hale, Jess Harnell, Phil LaMarr, Paul Michael Robinson, Tara Strong, Billy West	
M A R C H	30	Meet the Robinsons	Walt Disney Pictures / Walt Disney Animation Studios	Stephen Anderson (director/screenplay); Jon A. Bernstein, Michelle Spritz, Don Hall, Nathan Greno, Aurian Redson, Joe Mateo (screenplay); Angela Bassett, Tom Selleck, Harland Williams, Laurie Metcalf, Nicole Sullivan, Adam West, Jordan Fry, Wesley Singerman, Steve Anderson, Ethan Sandler, Don Hall, Tom Kenny, Jamie Cullum, Paul Butcher, Nathan Greno, Joe Whyte, Grace Rolek, Mick Hazen, Fred Tatasciore, Chuck Riley	
M A R C H	30	Blades of Glory	DreamWorks Pictures / MTV Films / Red Hour Films	Josh Gordon, Will Speck (directors); Jeff Cox, Craig Cox, John Altschuler, Dave Krinsky (screenplay); Will Ferrell, Jon Heder, Will Arnett, Amy Poehler, Craig T. Nelson, Jenna Fischer, William Fichtner, Romany Malco, Nick Swardson, Rob Corddry, William Daniels, Luke Wilson, Sasha Cohen, Scott Hamilton, Peggy Fleming, Brian Boitano, Dorothy Hamill, Nancy Kerrigan, John Zimmerman, Kyoko Ina, Yuka Sato, Jamie Salé, David Pelletier	
M A R C H	30	The Lookout	Miramax Films / Spyglass Entertainment	Scott Frank (director/screenplay); Joseph Gordon-Levitt, Jeff Daniels, Matthew Goode, Isla Fisher, Carla Gugino, Bruce McGill, Alberta Watson, Alex Borstein, Sergio Di Zio, David Huband, Laura Vandervoort, Greg Dunham, Morgan Kelly, Aaron Berg	

== April–June ==
Opening		Title	Production company	Cast and crew	Ref.
A P R I L	4	Are We Done Yet?	Columbia Pictures / Revolution Studios / RKO Pictures / Cubevision	Steve Carr (director); Hank Nelken (screenplay); Ice Cube, Nia Long, John C. McGinley, Aleisha Allen, Philip Daniel Bolden, Tahj Mowry, Dan Joffre, Pedro Miguel Arce, Linda Kash, Hayes McArthur, Colin and Gavin Strange, Jonathan Katz, Earvin "Magic" Johnson	
A P R I L	4	Firehouse Dog	20th Century Fox / Regency Enterprises	Todd Holland (director); Claire-Dee Lim, Mike Werb, Michael Colleary (screenplay); Josh Hutcherson, Bruce Greenwood, Dash Mihok, Steven Culp, Bill Nunn, Bree Turner, Scotch Ellis Loring, Mayte Garcia, Teddy Sears, Claudette Mink, Hannah Lochner, Matt Cooke, Shane Daly, Randy Triggs	
A P R I L	5	The Reaping	Warner Bros. Pictures / Village Roadshow Pictures / Dark Castle Entertainment	Stephen Hopkins (director); Carey Hayes, Chad Hayes (screenplay); Hilary Swank, David Morrissey, Idris Elba, AnnaSophia Robb, Stephen Rea, William Ragsdale, John McConnell, David Jensen, Stuart Greer, Lara Grice, Burgess Jenkins, Andrea Frankle, Yvonne Landry, Mark Lynch, Myles Cleveland, Samuel Garland, Cody Sanders, Sabrina A. Junius	
A P R I L	6	Grindhouse	The Weinstein Company / Dimension Films / Troublemaker Studios	Planet Terror – Robert Rodriguez (director/screenplay); Rose McGowan, Freddy Rodriguez, Michael Biehn, Jeff Fahey, Josh Brolin, Marley Shelton, Stacy Ferguson, Bruce Willis, Rebel Rodriguez, Electra and Elise Avellan, Naveen Andrews, Julio Oscar Mechoso, Nicky Katt, Hung Nguyen, Tom Savini, Carlos Gallardo, Skip Reissig, Quentin Tarantino, Greg Kelly, Michael Parks, Jerili Romero, Felix Sabates; Death Proof – Quentin Tarantino (director/screenplay); Kurt Russell, Rosario Dawson, Vanessa Ferlito, Jordan Ladd, Rose McGowan, Sydney Poitier, Tracie Thoms, Mary Elizabeth Winstead, Zoë Bell, Quentin Tarantino, Marcy Harriell, Eli Roth, Omar Doom, Michael Bacall, Monica Staggs, Jonathan Loughran, Michael Parks, James Parks, Marley Shelton	
A P R I L	6	The Hoax	Miramax Films / Bob Yari Productions / Mark Gordon Company	Lasse Hallström (director); William Wheeler (screenplay); Richard Gere, Alfred Molina, Marcia Gay Harden, Hope Davis, Julie Delpy, Stanley Tucci, Eli Wallach, Christopher Evan Welch, Peter McRobbie, Željko Ivanek, Milton Buras	
A P R I L	6	The TV Set	ThinkFilm	Jake Kasdan (director/screenplay); David Duchovny, Sigourney Weaver, Ioan Gruffudd, Judy Greer, Fran Kranz, Lindsay Sloane, Justine Bateman, Lucy Davis, Philip Rosenthal, Matt Price, Willie Garson, M. C. Gainey, Simon Helberg, Kaitlin Doubleday, Philip Baker Hall, Allison Scagliotti, Jonathan Silverman, Seth Green	
A P R I L	13	Aqua Teen Hunger Force Colon Movie Film for Theaters	First Look Pictures / Williams Street	Matt Maiellaro, Dave Willis (directors/screenplay); Dana Snyder, Dave Willis, Carey Means, Andy Merrill, Matt Maiellaro, Mike Schatz, C. Martin Croker, Bruce Campbell, Neil Peart, Chris Kattan, Mc chris, Fred Armisen, George Lowe, Isaac Hayes III, Tina Fey, H. Jon Benjamin, Jon Glaser, Craig Hartin, Matt Harrigan, Mastodon	
A P R I L	13	Disturbia	DreamWorks Pictures / The Montecito Picture Company	D.J. Caruso (director); Christopher Landon, Carl Ellsworth (screenplay); Shia LaBeouf, Sarah Roemer, Aaron Yoo, Carrie-Anne Moss, Matt Craven, David Morse, Viola Davis, Jose Pablo Cantillo, Kevin Quinn, Amanda Walsh, Luciano Rauso, Brandon and Daniel Caruso, Elyse Mirto, Rene Rivera, Charles Carroll, Gillian Shure, Dominic Daniel, Lisa Robin, Cindy Lou Adkins	
A P R I L	13	Lonely Hearts	Samuel Goldwyn Films / Roadside Attractions	Todd Robinson (director/screenplay); John Travolta, Jared Leto, Salma Hayek, James Gandolfini, Bailee Madison, Laura Dern, Scott Caan, Dagmara Domińczyk	
A P R I L	13	Pathfinder	20th Century Fox	Marcus Nispel (director); Laeta Kalogridis (screenplay); Karl Urban, Moon Bloodgood, Russell Means, Ralf Möller, Clancy Brown, Nathaniel Arcand, Jay Tavare, Kevin Loring, Duane Howard	
A P R I L	13	Perfect Stranger	Columbia Pictures / Revolution Studios	James Foley (director); Todd Komarnicki (screenplay); Halle Berry, Bruce Willis, Giovanni Ribisi, Gary Dourdan, Florencia Lozano, Jason Antoon, Patti D'Arbanville, Jane Bradbury, Jared Burke, Clea Lewis, Daniella van Graas, Tamara Feldman, Deirdre Lorenz, Nicki Aycox, Paula Miranda, Lauren Potter, Emma Heming	
A P R I L	13	Redline	Chicago Pictures	Andy Cheng (director); Robert Foreman, Daniel Sadek (screenplay); Nathan Phillips, Nadia Bjorlin, Angus Macfadyen, Tim Matheson, Eddie Griffin, Denyce Lawton, Jesse Johnson, Kevin Levrone, Barbara Niven, David Dayan Fisher, Hal Ozsan, Todd Lowe, Neill Skylar, Marc Crumpton, Faleolo Alailima, Michael Hagiwara, Christopher Backus, Mary Elise Hayden, Amber Lancaster, Ernie Reyes Jr., Joe Sagal, Daniel Sadek, Gus Hansen, David Williams	
A P R I L	13	Slow Burn	Lionsgate	Wayne Beach (director/screenplay); Anthony Walton (screenplay); Ray Liotta, LL Cool J, Mekhi Phifer, Taye Diggs, Jolene Blalock, Chiwetel Ejiofor, Guy Torry, Bruce McGill	
A P R I L	13	Year of the Dog	Paramount Vantage	Mike White (director/screenplay); Molly Shannon, Peter Sarsgaard, John C. Reilly, Laura Dern, Regina King, Thomas McCarthy, Josh Pais, Dale Godboldo, Inara George, Liza Weil, Amy Schlagel, Zoe Schlagel	
A P R I L	20	Fracture	New Line Cinema / Castle Rock Entertainment	Gregory Hoblit (director); Daniel Pyne, Glenn Gers (screenplay); Anthony Hopkins, Ryan Gosling, David Strathairn, Rosamund Pike, André Benjamin, Embeth Davidtz, Billy Burke, Cliff Curtis, Fiona Shaw, Bob Gunton, Josh Stamberg, Xander Berkeley, Zoe Kazan, Alla Korot	
A P R I L	20	Hot Fuzz	Rogue Pictures / StudioCanal / Working Title Films	Edgar Wright (director/screenplay); Simon Pegg (screenplay); Simon Pegg, Nick Frost, Jim Broadbent, Timothy Dalton, Bill Bailey, Bill Nighy, Martin Freeman, Steve Coogan, Cate Blanchett, Edward Woodward, Paddy Considine, Billie Whitelaw, David Bradley, Adam Buxton, Olivia Colman, Ron Cook, Kenneth Cranham, Julia Deakin, Kevin Eldon, Paul Freeman, Karl Johnson, Lucy Punch, Anne Reid, Rafe Spall, David Threlfall, Peter Wight, Stuart Wilson, Rory McCann, Robert Popper, Joe Cornish, Chris Waitt, Eric Mason, Lorraine Hilton, Patricia Franklin, Stephen Merchant, Tim Barlow, Ben McKay, Alice Lowe, Maria Charles, Peter Jackson, Garth Jennings, Edgar Wright	
A P R I L	20	In the Land of Women	Warner Bros. Pictures / Castle Rock Entertainment	Jon Kasdan (director/screenplay); Adam Brody, Kristen Stewart, Meg Ryan, Olympia Dukakis, Makenzie Vega, JoBeth Williams, Elena Anaya, Clark Gregg, Ginnifer Goodwin, Adrian Hough, Brenda James, Dustin Milligan, Rob Reinis, Elise Gatien, Danielle Savre, Christine Danielle Connolly, Graham Wardle, Jeff Cunningham, Karin Konoval, Ilyse Mimoun	
A P R I L	20	The Tripper	NaVinci Films	David Arquette (director/screenplay); Joe Harris (screenplay); Jaime King, Thomas Jane, Lukas Haas, Jason Mewes, Balthazar Getty, Marsha Thomason, Paul Reubens, Richmond Arquette, David Arquette, Courteney Cox Arquette, Christopher Allen Nelson, Paz de la Huerta, Redmond Gleeson, Michael X. Sommers, Wes Craven	
A P R I L	20	Vacancy	Screen Gems	Nimród Antal (director); Mark L. Smith (screenplay); Luke Wilson, Kate Beckinsale, Frank Whaley, Ethan Embry, Scott G. Anderson	
A P R I L	27	The Condemned	Lionsgate / WWE Studios	Scott Wiper (director/screenplay); Rob Hedden (screenplay); Steve Austin, Vinnie Jones, Nathan Jones, Robert Mammone, Tory Mussett, Manu Bennett, Madeleine West, Rick Hoffman, Masa Yamaguchi, Emelia Burns, Marcus Johnson, Dasi Ruz, Andy McPhee, Rai Fazio, Sam Healy, Sullivan Stapleton, Luke Pegler, Angie Milliken	
A P R I L	27	Diggers	Magnolia Pictures	Katherine Dieckmann (director); Ken Marino (screenplay); Paul Rudd, Lauren Ambrose, Ron Eldard, Josh Hamilton, Ken Marino, Sarah Paulson, Maura Tierney, Marie Matiko	
A P R I L	27	The Invisible	Hollywood Pictures / Spyglass Entertainment	David S. Goyer (director); Mick Davis, Christine Roum (screenplay); Justin Chatwin, Margarita Levieva, Chris Marquette, Marcia Gay Harden, Alex O'Loughlin, Callum Keith Rennie, Michelle Harrison, Tania Saulnier, Ryan Kennedy, Andrew Francis, Maggie Ma, P. Lynn Johnson, Serge Houde, Bilal Sayed, Cory Monteith	
A P R I L	27	Kickin' It Old Skool	Yari Film Group	Harvey Glazer (director); Trace Slobotkin, Josh Siegal, Dylan Morgan (screenplay); Jamie Kennedy, Maria Menounos, Michael Rosenbaum, Miguel A. Núñez Jr., Vivica A. Fox, Debra Jo Rupp, Christopher McDonald, Bobby Lee, Aris Alvarado, Alan Ruck, Jesse Brown, David Hasselhoff, Emmanuel Lewis, Alexander Calvert, Alexia Fast, J.R. Messado, Taylor Beaumont, Hanson Ng, Anthony Grant, Kira Clavell, Regan Oey, Burkely Duffield	
A P R I L	27	Next	Paramount Pictures / Revolution Studios / Saturn Films / Virtual Studios	Lee Tamahori (director); Gary Goldman, Jonathan Hensleigh, Paul Bernbaum (screenplay); Nicolas Cage, Julianne Moore, Jessica Biel, Thomas Kretschmann, Peter Falk, Tory Kittles, Jim Beaver, Enzo Cilenti, Jason Butler Harner, Jose Zuniga	
A P R I L	27	Snow Cake	IFC Films / The Weinstein Company	Marc Evans (director); Angela Pell (screenplay); Alan Rickman, Sigourney Weaver, Carrie-Anne Moss, Emily Hampshire, James Allodi, Callum Keith Rennie, David Fox, Jayne Eastwood, Julie Stewart, Selina Cadell, Janet van de Graaf, Nia Roberts, Dov Tiefenbach, Susan Coyne, Mark McKinney	
M A Y	2	Waitress	Fox Searchlight Pictures	Adrienne Shelly (director/screenplay); Keri Russell, Nathan Fillion, Cheryl Hines, Jeremy Sisto, Andy Griffith, Adrienne Shelly, Eddie Jemison, Lew Temple, Darby Stanchfield, Lauri Johnson, Sarah Hunley, Nora Paradiso, Holgie Forrester, Sophie Ostroy	
M A Y	4	Civic Duty	Freestyle Releasing	Jeff Renfroe (director); Andrew Joiner (screenplay); Peter Krause, Khaled Abol Naga, Richard Schiff, Kari Matchett, Ian Tracey, Vanesa Tomasino, Laurie Murdoch, Michael Roberds, Agam Darshi, Mark Brandon, Brenda Crichlow, Val Cole, Mark Docherty, Michael St. John Smith, P. Lynn Johnson	
M A Y	4	Lucky You	Warner Bros. Pictures / Village Roadshow Pictures	Curtis Hanson (director/screenplay); Eric Roth (screenplay); Eric Bana, Drew Barrymore, Robert Duvall, Jean Smart, Debra Messing, Robert Downey Jr., Horatio Sanz, Kelvin Han Yee, Michael Shannon, Danny Hoch, Evan Jones, Phyllis Somerville, Sam Farha, Chau Giang, Barry Greenstein, Jason Lester, Ted Forrest, Minh Ly, John Murphy, Erick Lindgren, Daniel Negreanu, Doyle Brunson, Johnny Chan, Hoyt Corkins, Antonio Esfandiari, Chris Ferguson, Dan Harrington, Phil Hellmuth, Karina Jett, John Juanda, Mike Matusow, Erik Seidel, Mimi Tran, Marsha Waggoner, Robert Williamson III, Cyndy Violette, Jennifer Harman, John Hennigan, David Oppenheim, Jack Binion, Matt Savage	
M A Y	4	Spider-Man 3	Columbia Pictures / Marvel Entertainment	Sam Raimi (director/screenplay); Ivan Raimi, Alvin Sargent (screenplay); Tobey Maguire, Kirsten Dunst, James Franco, Thomas Haden Church, Topher Grace, Bryce Dallas Howard, Rosemary Harris, James Cromwell, Theresa Russell, J. K. Simmons, Dylan Baker, Elizabeth Banks, Perla Haney-Jardine, Willem Dafoe, Cliff Robertson, Bill Nunn, Ted Raimi, Michael Papajohn, Elya Baskin, Mageina Tovah, Joe Manganiello, Stan Lee, Bruce Campbell, Becky Ann Baker, Hal Fishman, Lucy Gordon, Steve Valentine, Tim Maculan, Marc Vann, Gregg Daniel, April D. Parker, Robert Curtis Brown, Christina Cindrich, Emilio Rivera, Dean Edwards, Craig Castaldo, Grant Curtis, Shade Rupe, Jimmy Star, Aija Tērauda, Christopher Young	
M A Y	11	28 Weeks Later	Fox Atomic	Juan Carlos Fresnadillo (director/screenplay); Rowan Joffé, E. L. Lavigne, Jesus Olmo (screenplay); Robert Carlyle, Rose Byrne, Jeremy Renner, Harold Perrineau, Catherine McCormack, Imogen Poots, Idris Elba, Mackintosh Muggleton, Amanda Walker, Garfield Morgan, Emily Beecham, Philip Bulcock, Roderic Culver, Karen Meagher, Raymond Waring	
M A Y	11	Delta Farce	Lionsgate	C. B. Harding (director); Bear Aderhold, Tom Sullivan (screenplay); Bill Engvall, Larry the Cable Guy, DJ Qualls, Keith David, Danny Trejo, Marisol Nichols, Lisa Lampanelli, Jeff Dunham	
M A Y	11	The Ex	Metro-Goldwyn-Mayer / The Weinstein Company / 2929 Productions	Jesse Peretz (director); David Guion, Michael Handelman (screenplay); Zach Braff, Amanda Peet, Jason Bateman, Mia Farrow, Charles Grodin, Donal Logue, Amy Poehler, Paul Rudd, Fred Armisen, Amy Adams, Josh Charles, Marin Hinkle, Romany Malco, Yul Vazquez, Lucian Maisel	
M A Y	11	Georgia Rule	Universal Pictures / Morgan Creek Productions	Garry Marshall (director); Mark Andrus (screenplay); Jane Fonda, Lindsay Lohan, Felicity Huffman, Dermot Mulroney, Garrett Hedlund, Laurie Metcalf, Cary Elwes, Héctor Elizondo, Dylan McLaughlin, Zachary Gordon, Tereza Stanislav, Fred Applegate, Cynthia Ferrer, Destiney Moore, Christine Lakin, Chelse Swain, Shea Curry, Michael Clifford	
M A Y	11	ShowBusiness: The Road to Broadway	Regent Releasing	Dori Berinstein (director); Alan Cumming, Boy George, Idina Menzel, Rosie O'Donnell, Kristin Chenoweth, Raul Esparza, Euan Morton, George C. Wolfe, Tonya Pinkins, Robert Lopez, Jeff Marx, Tony Kushner, Stephen Schwartz, Stephanie D'Abruzzo	
M A Y	16	Once	Fox Searchlight Pictures	John Carney (director/screenplay); Glen Hansard, Markéta Irglová, Hugh Walsh, Gerard Hendrick, Alaistair Foley, Geoff Minogue, Bill Hodnett, Danuse Ktrestova, Darren Healy, Mal Whyte, Marcella Plunkett, Niall Cleary, Wiltold Owski, Krzysztos Tlotka, Tomek Glowacki, Keith Byrne	
M A Y	18	Black Book	Sony Pictures Classics	Paul Verhoeven (director/screenplay); Gerard Soeteman (screenplay); Carice van Houten, Sebastian Koch, Thom Hoffman, Halina Reijn, Waldemar Kobus, Derek de Lint, Christian Berkel, Dolf de Vries, Peter Blok, Michiel Huisman, Ronald Armburst, Frank Lammers, Matthias Schoenaerts, Johnny de Mol, Xander Straat	
M A Y	18	Even Money	Yari Film Group / Freestyle Releasing	Mark Rydell (director); Robert Tannen (screenplay); Kim Basinger, Danny DeVito, Kelsey Grammer, Nick Cannon, Ray Liotta, Forest Whitaker, Carla Gugino, Jay Mohr, Tim Roth, Charlie Robinson	
M A Y	18	Shrek the Third	Paramount Pictures / DreamWorks Animation / PDI/DreamWorks	Chris Miller (director/screenplay); Jeffrey Price, Peter S. Seaman, Aron Warner (screenplay); Mike Myers, Eddie Murphy, Cameron Diaz, Antonio Banderas, Justin Timberlake, Julie Andrews, John Cleese, Rupert Everett, Eric Idle, Conrad Vernon, Cody Cameron, Larry King, Christopher Knights, Amy Poehler, Maya Rudolph, Amy Sedaris, Aron Warner, Cheri Oteri, Ian McShane, Susanne Blakeslee, Regis Philbin, Mark Valley, Chris Miller, Tom McGrath, Seth Rogen, Tom Kane, Kari Wahlgren, John Krasinski, Kelly Asbury, Walt Dohrn, Dante James Hauser, Jordan Alexander Hauser	
M A Y	18	The Wendell Baker Story	ThinkFilm	Andrew Wilson, Luke Wilson (directors); Luke Wilson (screenplay); Luke Wilson, Eva Mendes, Owen Wilson, Eddie Griffin, Kris Kristofferson, Harry Dean Stanton, Seymour Cassel, Will Ferrell, Jacob Vargas, Mac Davis	
M A Y	25	Bug	Lionsgate	William Friedkin (director); Tracy Letts (screenplay); Ashley Judd, Michael Shannon, Harry Connick Jr., Lynn Collins, Brian F. O'Byrne	
M A Y	25	Pirates of the Caribbean: At World's End	Walt Disney Pictures / Jerry Bruckheimer Films	Gore Verbinski (director); Ted Elliott, Terry Rossio (screenplay); Johnny Depp, Orlando Bloom, Keira Knightley, Stellan Skarsgård, Bill Nighy, Chow Yun-fat, Geoffrey Rush, Jack Davenport, Kevin R. McNally, Jonathan Pryce, Naomie Harris, Tom Hollander, Lee Arenberg, Mackenzie Crook, David Bailie, Martin Klebba, Keith Richards, David Schofield, Greg Ellis, Lauren Maher, Vanessa Branch, Angus Barnett, Giles New, Reggie Lee, Ghassan Massoud, Marcel Iureș, Sergio Calderón, Takayo Fischer, Hakeem Kae-Kazim, Marshall Manesh, Dominic Scott Kay, Dermot Keaney, Clive Ashborn, Winston Ellis, Christopher Adamson, Andy Beckwith, Jonathan Linsley, Omid Djalili, Chris M. Allport, Ned Wertimer, Mark Hildreth, JB Blanc, Chuy Bravo	
M A Y	27	Bury My Heart at Wounded Knee	HBO Films / Wolf Films / Traveler's Rest Films	Yves Simoneau (director); Daniel Giat (screenplay); Aidan Quinn, Adam Beach, August Schellenberg, Anna Paquin, Chevez Ezaneh, Colm Feore, Fred Dalton Thompson, Duane Howard, Nathan Lee Chasing His Horse, Shaun Johnston, Gordon Tootoosis, Billy Merasty, Morris Birdyellowhead, Eddie Spears, Eric Schweig, Jimmy Herman, Patrick St. Esprit, J.K. Simmons, Wes Studi, Lee Tergesen, Brian Stollery, Sean Wei Mah, Marty Atonini	
J U N E	1	Crazy Love	Magnolia Pictures	Dan Klores, Fisher Stevens (directors); Burt Pugach, Linda Riss, Jimmy Breslin, William Kunstler, Mike Douglas, Joe Franklin, Sally Jessy Raphael, Geraldo Rivera	
J U N E	1	Gracie	Picturehouse	Davis Guggenheim (director); Lisa Marie Petersen, Karen Janszen (screenplay); Elisabeth Shue, Carly Schroeder, Andrew Shue, Dermot Mulroney, Jesse Lee Soffer, Emma Bell, John Doman, Christopher Shand, Hunter Schroeder, Trevor Heins, Joshua Caras, Madison Arnold	
J U N E	1	Knocked Up	Universal Pictures	Judd Apatow (director/screenplay); Seth Rogen, Katherine Heigl, Paul Rudd, Leslie Mann, Jason Segel, Jay Baruchel, Jonah Hill, Martin Starr, Bill Hader, Alan Tudyk, Kristen Wiig, Charlyne Yi, Harold Ramis, Joanna Kerns, Ken Jeong, J. P. Manoux, Tim Bagley, B. J. Novak, Mo Collins, Loudon Wainwright, Adam Scott, Craig Robinson, Tami Sagher, Stormy Daniels, Jessica Alba, Steve Carell, Andy Dick, James Franco, Eva Mendes, Ryan Seacrest, Dax Shepard	
J U N E	1	Mr. Brooks	Metro-Goldwyn-Mayer	Bruce A. Evans (director/screenplay); Raynold Gideon (screenplay); Kevin Costner, Demi Moore, Dane Cook, William Hurt, Marg Helgenberger, Ruben Santiago-Hudson, Danielle Panabaker, Aisha Hinds, Lindsay Crouse, Jason Lewis, Reiko Aylesworth, Matt Schulze, Yasmine Delawari, Traci Dinwiddie, Michael Cole, Laura Bailey	
J U N E	8	Ocean's Thirteen	Warner Bros. Pictures / Village Roadshow Pictures / Jerry Weintraub Productions	Steven Soderbergh (director); Brian Koppelman, David Levien (screenplay); George Clooney, Brad Pitt, Matt Damon, Andy García, Don Cheadle, Bernie Mac, Ellen Barkin, Al Pacino, Elliott Gould, Casey Affleck, Scott Caan, Eddie Jemison, Shaobo Qin, Carl Reiner, Eddie Izzard, Vincent Cassel, Bob Einstein, Olga Sosnovska, David Paymer, Julian Sands, Jerry Weintraub, Oprah Winfrey, Ivar Brogger, Armen Weitzman, Noureen DeWulf, Don McManus, Jon Wellner, Angel Oquendo, Wayne Péré, Joe Chrest, Tim Conlon, Taro Akebono, Michael Harney, Margaret Travolta, Tommy Hinkley, Scott L. Schwartz, Gregor Collins, Michael Mantell, Michael Miranda	
J U N E	8	Surf's Up	Columbia Pictures / Sony Pictures Animation	Ash Brannon, Chris Buck (directors/screenplay); Don Rhymer, Chris Jenkins (screenplay); Shia LaBeouf, Jeff Bridges, Zooey Deschanel, Jon Heder, James Woods, Diedrich Bader, Mario Cantone, Dana Belben, Brian Posehn, Kelly Slater, Rob Machado, Ash Brannon, Chris Buck, Sal Masekela, Maddie Taylor, Bob Bergen, Johanna Braddy, John Cygan, Courtnee Draper, Bill Farmer, Teresa Ganzel, Jess Harnell, Sherry Lynn, Laraine Newman, Jan Rabson, Jacob Zachar, Ryder Buck, Reese Elowe, Jack P. Ranjo, Crawford Wilson, Danny Mann, Mickie McGowan	
J U N E	15	DOA: Dead or Alive	Dimension Films	Corey Yuen (director); Adam Gross, Seth Gross, J.F. Lawton (screenplay); Devon Aoki, Holly Valance, Jaime Pressly, Kane Kosugi, Eric Roberts, Sarah Carter, Natassia Malthe, Matthew Marsden, Steve Howey, Collin Chou, Kevin Nash, Brian J. White, Derek Boyer, Silvio Simac, Song Lin, Fang Liu, Hung Lin, Ying Wang	
J U N E	15	Eagle vs. Shark	Miramax Films / Unison Films / Whenua Films	Taika Waititi (director/screenplay); Jemaine Clement, Loren Horsley, Craig Hall, Joel Tobeck, Brian Sergent, Rachel House, David Fane, Taika Waititi, Chelsie Preston Crayford, Gentiane Lupi	
J U N E	15	Fantastic Four: Rise of the Silver Surfer	20th Century Fox / Marvel Entertainment	Tim Story (director); Don Payne, Mark Frost (screenplay); Ioan Gruffudd, Jessica Alba, Chris Evans, Michael Chiklis, Julian McMahon, Kerry Washington, Andre Braugher, Doug Jones, Laurence Fishburne, Beau Garrett, Vanessa Minnillo, Brian Posehn, Zach Grenier, Kevin McNulty, Andy Stahl, Kenneth Welsh, Giuliana Rancic, Lauren Sanchez, Stan Lee	
J U N E	15	Nancy Drew	Warner Bros. Pictures / Virtual Studios	Andrew Fleming (director/screenplay): Tiffany Paulsen (screenplay); Emma Roberts, Josh Flitter, Max Thieriot, Rachael Leigh Cook, Tate Donovan, Marshall Bell, Laura Harring, Barry Bostwick, Daniella Monet, Kelly Vitz, Caroline Aaron, Adam Clark, Pat Carroll, Amy Bruckner, Kay Panabaker, Cliff Bemis, Kaitlyn Van Item, Bruce Willis, Adam Goldberg, Chris Kattan, Lindsay Sloane, Eddie Jemison, Geraint Wyn Davies	
J U N E	15	Paris, je t'aime	First Look International	Olivier Assayas, Frédéric Auburtin, Gérard Depardieu, Gurinder Chadha, Sylvain Chomet, Joel and Ethan Coen, Isabel Coixet, Wes Craven, Vincenzo Natali, Richard LaGravenese, Christopher Doyle, Alfonso Cuarón, Alexander Payne, Bruno Podalydès, Walter Salles, Daniela Thomas, Oliver Schmitz, Nobuhiro Suwa, Tom Tykwer, Gus Van Sant (directors/screenplay); Paul Mayeda Berges, Gabrielle Keng Peralta, Rain Kathy Li, Gena Rowlands, Nadine Eïd (screenplay); Fanny Ardant, Leïla Bekhti, Melchior Beslon, Juliette Binoche, Seydou Boro, Steve Buscemi, Sergio Castellitto, Willem Dafoe, Gerard Depardieu, Cyril Descours, Marianne Faithfull, Ben Gazzara, Maggie Gyllenhaal, Bob Hoskins, Emily Mortimer, Yolande Moreau, Margo Martindale, Aïssa Maïga, Elias McConnell, Li Xin, Olga Kurylenko, Florence Muller, Nick Nolte, Bruno Podalydès, Natalie Portman, Paul Putner, Miranda Richardson, Gena Rowlands, Catalina Sandino Moreno, Ludivine Sagnier, Barbet Schroeder, Rufus Sewell, Gaspard Ulliel, Elijah Wood, Alexander Payne, Javier Cámara, Leonor Watling, Hippolyte Girardot, Hervé Pierre, Sara Martins, Joana Preiss, Nicolas Maury, Adel Bencherif, Nino Kirtadze, Dinara Drukarova, Emmanuel Finkiel, Axel Kiener, Julie Bataille, Martin Combes, Lionel Dray	
J U N E	22	1408	Metro-Goldwyn-Mayer / Dimension Films	Mikael Håfström (director); Matt Greenberg, Scott Alexander, Larry Karaszewski (screenplay); John Cusack, Samuel L. Jackson, Mary McCormack, Tony Shalhoub, Len Cariou, Isiah Whitlock Jr., Kim Thomson, Benny Urquidez, Andrew-Lee Potts, Jules de Jongh, Jasmine Jessica Anthony, Paul Birchard, Margot Leicester, Alexandra Silber, Johann Urb, Kim Thomson, Drew Powell, Paul Kasey, Angel Oquendo, Kevin Dobson, Mike Quinn, Kate Walsh	
J U N E	22	Broken English	Magnolia Pictures / HDNet Films / Vox3 Films / Phantom Film Co. Ltd.	Zoe Cassavetes (director/screenplay); Parker Posey, Melvil Poupaud, Drea de Matteo, Justin Theroux, Peter Bogdanovich, Gena Rowlands, Roy Thinnes, Tim Guinee, Michael Panes, Dana Ivey, William Wise, Josh Hamilton, Caitlin Keats, Michael Kelly, James McCaffrey, Phyllis Somerville, Bernadette Lafont, Thierry Hancisse	
J U N E	22	Evan Almighty	Universal Pictures / Spyglass Entertainment / Relativity Media / Original Film / Shady Acres Entertainment	Tom Shadyac (director); Steve Oedekerk (screenplay); Steve Carell, Morgan Freeman, Lauren Graham, John Goodman, John Michael Higgins, Jimmy Bennett, Wanda Sykes, Jonah Hill, Molly Shannon, Graham Phillips, Johnny Simmons, Ed Helms, Rachael Harris, Brian Howe, Harve Presnell, Madison Mason, Bruce Gray, Paul Collins, Jim Doughan, Meagen Fay, Dean Norris, Jon Stewart, Catherine Bell, Maile Flanagan, Lisa Arch, Simon Helberg, David Barrera, P.J. Byrne, Ralph Louis Harris, Arden Myrin, Jesse Burch, Wayne Wilderson, Gerald Downey, Suzy Nakamura, Larry Sullivan, Audrey Wasilewski, Jon Wellner, Pete Gardner, Jan Hoag, Lillian Lehman, Catherine McGoohan, Phil Reeves, Tucker Smallwood, David St. James, Gregg Daniel, Bart the Bear 2	
J U N E	22	A Mighty Heart	Paramount Vantage	Michael Winterbottom (director); John Orloff (screenplay); Angelina Jolie, Dan Futterman, Adnan Siddiqui, Irrfan Khan, Archie Panjabi, Will Patton, Alyy Khan, William Hoyland, Denis O'Hare, Bilal Saeed, Shah Murad Aliani, Ahmed A. Jamal, Daud Khan, Ikram Bhatti, Jeffry Kaplow, Perrine Moran, Azfar Ali, Imran Hasnee, Jillian Armenante, Zachary Coffin, Demetri Goritsas, Pervez Musharraf, Colin Powell, Sajid Hasan, Mikail Lotia, Gary Wilmes, Sean Chapman	
J U N E	22	You Kill Me	IFC Films	John Dahl (director); Christopher Markus and Stephen McFeely (screenplay); Ben Kingsley, Téa Leoni, Luke Wilson, Dennis Farina, Philip Baker Hall, Bill Pullman, Marcus Thomas, Jayne Eastwood	
J U N E	27	Live Free or Die Hard	20th Century Fox	Len Wiseman (director); Mark Bomback (screenplay); Bruce Willis, Justin Long, Timothy Olyphant, Mary Elizabeth Winstead, Maggie Q, Kevin Smith, Cliff Curtis, Jonathan Sadowski, Edoardo Costa, Cyril Raffaelli, Yorgo Constantine, Željko Ivanek, Christina Chang, Chris Ellis, Sung Kang, Matt O'Leary, Jake McDorman, Tim Russ, Chris Palmero, Andrew Friedman, Bryon Weiss, Rosemary Knower	
J U N E	29	Evening	Focus Features	Lajos Koltai (director); Susan Minot, Michael Cunningham (screenplay); Claire Danes, Toni Collette, Vanessa Redgrave, Patrick Wilson, Hugh Dancy, Natasha Richardson, Mamie Gummer, Eileen Atkins, Meryl Streep, Glenn Close, Barry Bostwick, Ebon Moss-Bachrach, David Call, Kara F. Doherty	
J U N E	29	Ratatouille	Walt Disney Pictures / Pixar Animation Studios	Brad Bird (director/screenplay); Patton Oswalt, Lou Romano, Brad Garrett, Ian Holm, Peter O'Toole, Janeane Garofalo, Will Arnett, Brian Dennehy, Peter Sohn, James Remar, John Ratzenberger, Teddy Newton, Jake Steinfeld, Brad Bird, Stéphane Roux, Thomas Keller, Brad Lewis, Michael Giacchino, Julius Callahan, Tony Fucile	
J U N E	29	Sicko	The Weinstein Company	Michael Moore (director/screenplay); Michael Moore	

== July–September ==
Opening		Title	Production company	Cast and crew	Ref.
J U L Y	3	License to Wed	Warner Bros. Pictures / Village Roadshow Pictures / Phoenix Pictures	Ken Kwapis (director); Kim Barker, Tim Rasmussen, Vince Di Meglio (screenplay); Robin Williams, Mandy Moore, John Krasinski, Christine Taylor, Eric Christian Olsen, Josh Flitter, DeRay Davis, Peter Strauss, Grace Zabriskie, Roxanne Hart, Mindy Kaling, Angela Kinsey, Rachael Harris, Brian Baumgartner, Wanda Sykes	
J U L Y	3	Transformers	DreamWorks Pictures / Paramount Pictures	Michael Bay (director); Roberto Orci, Alex Kurtzman (screenplay); Shia LaBeouf, Megan Fox, Tyrese Gibson, Josh Duhamel, Anthony Anderson, Rachael Taylor, John Turturro, Jon Voight, Kevin Dunn, Julie White, Amaury Nolasco, Travis Van Winkle, Bernie Mac, Michael O'Neill, W. Morgan Sheppard, Zack Ward, John Robinson, Johnny Sanchez, Peter Jacobson, Glenn Morshower, Ravi Patel, J. P. Manoux, Odette Yustman, Tom Everett, Colton Haynes, Chris Ellis, Steven Ford, Michael Shamus Wiles, Brian Stepanek, Samantha Smith, Rick Gomez, Colin Fickes, Tom Lenk, Esther Scott, Pete Gardner, Michelle Pierce, Bob Stephenson, Omar Benson Miller, Peter Cullen, Mark Ryan, Darius McCrary, Robert Foxworth, Jess Harnell, Hugo Weaving, Jim Wood, Reno Wilson, Charlie Adler	
J U L Y	4	Rescue Dawn	Metro-Goldwyn-Mayer	Werner Herzog (director/screenplay); Christian Bale, Steve Zahn, Jeremy Davies, Pat Healy, François Chau, Toby Huss, Zach Grenier, Marshall Bell, GQ, James Oliver, Brad Carr, Saichia Wongwiroj, Teerawat Mulvilai, Yuttana Muenwaja, Kriangsak Ming-olo, Somkuan "Kuan" Siroon, Chorn Solyda, Galen Yuen, Abhijati "Muek" Jusakul, Chaiyan "Lek" Chunsuttiwat, Craig Gellis	
J U L Y	6	Joshua	Fox Searchlight Pictures	George Ratliff (director/screenplay); David Gilbert (screenplay); Sam Rockwell, Vera Farmiga, Jacob Kogan, Celia Weston, Dallas Roberts, Michael McKean, Nancy Giles, Linda Larkin, Alex Draper, Ezra Barnes, Jodie Markell, Rufus Collins, Haviland Morris, Tom Bloom, Jack Cortes	
J U L Y	7	Rise: Blood Hunter	Samuel Goldwyn Films	Sebastian Gutierrez (director/screenplay); Lucy Liu, Michael Chiklis, Carla Gugino, James D'Arcy, Margo Harshman, Robert Forster, Mako, Allan Rich, Holt McCallany, Julio Oscar Mechoso, Samaire Armstrong, Elden Henson, Paul Cassell, Simon Rex, Cameron Goodman, Cameron Richardson, Marilyn Manson, Nick Lachey	
J U L Y	11	Harry Potter and the Order of the Phoenix	Warner Bros. Pictures / Heyday Films	David Yates (director); Michael Goldenberg (screenplay); Daniel Radcliffe, Rupert Grint, Emma Watson, Helena Bonham Carter, Robbie Coltrane, Warwick Davis, Michael Gambon, Ciarán Hinds, Brendan Gleeson, Ralph Fiennes, Imelda Staunton, Gary Oldman, Jason Isaacs, David Thewlis, Richard Griffiths, Emma Thompson, Alan Rickman, Fiona Shaw, Maggie Smith, Julie Walters, Mark Williams, David Bradley, Tom Felton, Natalia Tena, Bonnie Wright, Evanna Lynch, Devon Murray, Adrian Rawlins, Geraldine Somerville, Harry Melling, Robert Hardy, Oliver Phelps, James Phelps, Chris Rankin, Katie Leung, Matthew Lewis, Robert Pattinson, Alfred Enoch, Afshan Azad, Shefali Chowdhury	
J U L Y	13	Captivity	Lionsgate	Roland Joffé (director); Larry Cohen, Joseph Tura (screenplay); Elisha Cuthbert, Daniel Gillies, Michael Harney, Laz Alonso, Pruitt Taylor Vince, Maggie Damon	
J U L Y	13	Interview	Sony Pictures Classics	Steve Buscemi (director/screenplay); David Schechter (screenplay); Steve Buscemi, Sienna Miller, Danny Schechter, James Franco (voice), Tara Elders, Molly Griffith, Philippe Vonlanthen, Katja Schuurman	
J U L Y	13	Talk to Me	Focus Features / Sidney Kimmel Entertainment	Kasi Lemmons (director); Michael Genet, Rick Famuyiwa (screenplay); Don Cheadle, Chiwetel Ejiofor, Cedric the Entertainer, Taraji P. Henson, Mike Epps, Martin Sheen, Vondie Curtis-Hall, Richard Chevolleau, Alison Sealy-Smith, Elle Downs, Herbert L. Rawlings Jr., Damir Andrei, Jim Malmberg	
J U L Y	20	Hairspray	New Line Cinema	Adam Shankman (director); Leslie Dixon (screenplay); Nikki Blonsky, John Travolta, Michelle Pfeiffer, Christopher Walken, Amanda Bynes, James Marsden, Queen Latifah, Brittany Snow, Zac Efron, Elijah Kelley, Allison Janney, Paul Dooley, Jayne Eastwood, Jerry Stiller, Taylor Parks, Tabitha Lupien, Ricki Lake, Marc Shaiman, Scott Wittman, John Waters, Anne Fletcher, Zach Woodlee, Marissa Jaret Winokur, Harvey Fierstein, Corey Reynolds, Arthur Adams, Chester Gregory, Aimee Allen, Jamal Sims, George King, Curtis Holbrook, Hayley Podschun, Phillip Spaeth, Cassie Silva, Nick Baga, Sarah Jayne Jansen, Jesse Weafer, Kelly Fletcher, J.P. Ferreri, Spencer Liff, Laura Edwards, Corey Gorewicz, Joshua Feldman, Becca Sweitzer, Everett Smith, Tiffany Engen, Brooke Engen, Nadine Ellis, Arike Rice, Tanee McCall, Adam Shankman	
J U L Y	20	I Now Pronounce You Chuck & Larry	Universal Pictures / Relativity Media / Shady Acres Entertainment / Happy Madison Productions	Dennis Dugan (director); Barry Fanaro, Alexander Payne, Jim Taylor (screenplay); Adam Sandler, Kevin James, Jessica Biel, Ving Rhames, Steve Buscemi, Dan Aykroyd, Peter Dante, Nicholas Turturro, Rachel Dratch, Allen Covert, Richard Chamberlain, Nick Swardson, John Farley, Lance Bass, Mary Pat Gleason, Dave Matthews, Blake Clark, Dan Patrick, Chandra West, Tila Tequila, Jamie Chung, Dennis Dugan, Rob Corddry, Jonathan Loughran, Becky and Jessie O'Donohue, Robert Smigel, David Spade, Rob Schneider, Jim Ford	
J U L Y	20	Sunshine	Fox Searchlight Pictures	Danny Boyle (director); Alex Garland (screenplay); Cillian Murphy, Rose Byrne, Cliff Curtis, Chris Evans, Troy Garity, Hiroyuki Sanada, Benedict Wong, Michelle Yeoh, Chipo Chung, Mark Strong, Paloma Baeza	
J U L Y	25	Arctic Tale	Paramount Vantage	Adam Ravetch, Sarah Robertson (directors); Linda Woolverton, Mose Richards, Kristin Gore (screenplay); Queen Latifah	
J U L Y	27	I Know Who Killed Me	TriStar Pictures	Chris Sivertson (director); Jeff Hammond (screenplay); Lindsay Lohan, Julia Ormond, Neal McDonough, Brian Geraghty, Garcelle Beauvais-Nilon, Spencer Garrett, Kenya Moore	
J U L Y	27	No Reservations	Warner Bros. Pictures / Castle Rock Entertainment / Village Roadshow Pictures	Scott Hicks (director); Carol Fuchs, Sandra Nettelbeck (screenplay); Catherine Zeta-Jones, Aaron Eckhart, Abigail Breslin, Patricia Clarkson, Jenny Wade, Bob Balaban, Brian F. O'Byrne, Lily Rabe, Arija Bareikis, John McMartin, Celia Weston, Zoë Kravitz, Dearbhla Molloy, Matt Servitto, Fulvio Cecere	
J U L Y	27	The Simpsons Movie	20th Century Fox / Gracie Films	David Silverman (director); James L. Brooks, Matt Groening, Al Jean, Ian Maxtone-Graham, George Meyer, David Mirkin, Mike Reiss, Mike Scully, Matt Selman, John Swartzwelder, Jon Vitti (screenplay); Dan Castellaneta, Julie Kavner, Nancy Cartwright, Yeardley Smith, Hank Azaria, Harry Shearer, Pamela Hayden, Tress MacNeille, Albert Brooks, Karl Wiedergott, Marcia Wallace, Russi Taylor, Maggie Roswell, Phil Rosenthal, Joe Mantegna, Tom Hanks, Green Day	
J U L Y	27	Who's Your Caddy?	Metro-Goldwyn-Mayer / Our Stories Films / Dimension Films	Don Michael Paul (director/screenplay); Bradley Allenstein, Robert Henny (screenplay); Antwan "Big Boi" Patton, Jeffrey Jones, James Avery, Tony Cox, Tamala Jones, Jenifer Lewis, Andy Milonakis, Jim Piddock, Sherri Shepherd, Faizon Love, David Kelly, Bruce Bruce, Terry Crews, Finesse Mitchell, Garrett Morris, Cam Gigandet, Chase Tatum, Susan Ward, Lawrence Hilton-Jacobs, Robert Curtis Brown, Jesper Parnevik, Matthew Reichel, Lil Wayne	
A U G U S T	3	The Bourne Ultimatum	Universal Pictures / The Kennedy/Marshall Company	Paul Greengrass (director); Tony Gilroy, Scott Z. Burns, George Nolfi (screenplay); Matt Damon, Julia Stiles, David Strathairn, Scott Glenn, Paddy Considine, Édgar Ramírez, Albert Finney, Joan Allen, Daniel Brühl, Tom Gallop, Corey Johnson, Joey Ansah, Colin Stinton, Lucy Liemann, Franka Potente	
A U G U S T	3	Bratz: The Movie	Lionsgate	Sean McNamara (director); Susan Estelle Jansen (screenplay); Nathalia Ramos, Skyler Shaye, Logan Browning, Janel Parrish, Chelsea Kane Staub, Anneliese van der Pol, Malese Jow, Ian Nelson, Stephen Lunsford, Lainie Kazan, Jon Voight, Carl Hancock Rux, William May, Emily Everhard, Chet Hanks, Kim Morgan Greene, Sasha Cohen, Andrea Edwards, Constance Hsu, Kadeem Hardison, Tami-Adrian Greorge, Sean McNamara, Lee Reherman, Daniel Booko, Susie Singer Carter	
A U G U S T	3	Hot Rod	Paramount Pictures	Akiva Schaffer (director); Pam Brady (screenplay); Andy Samberg, Jorma Taccone, Bill Hader, Danny McBride, Isla Fisher, Sissy Spacek, Ian McShane, Will Arnett, Chris Parnell, Chester Tam, Mark Acheson, Alvin Sanders, Akiva Schaffer, Britt Irvin, Brittany Tiplady, Andrew Moxham	
A U G U S T	3	The Ten	ThinkFilm	David Wain (director/screenplay); Ken Marino (screenplay); Adam Brody, Rob Corddry, Famke Janssen, Kerri Kenney-Silver, Ken Marino, Gretchen Mol, Oliver Platt, Paul Rudd, Winona Ryder, Liev Schreiber, Justin Theroux, Jessica Alba, Janeane Garofalo, Mather Zickel, A.D. Miles, Michael Showalter, David Wain, Thomas Lennon, Bobby Cannavale, Ron Silver, Joe Lo Truglio, Robert Ben Garant, Jason Sudeikis, Kevin Allison, Rashida Jones, Jon Hamm, Tommy Nelson, Michael Ian Black, H. Jon Benjamin, Jason Antoon, Michael Ziegfeld, John Tormey	
A U G U S T	3	Underdog	Walt Disney Pictures / Spyglass Entertainment	Frederik Du Chau (director); Joe Piscatella, Adam Rifkin, Craig A. Williams (screenplay); Jason Lee, Peter Dinklage, Jim Belushi, Patrick Warburton, Alex Neuberger, Taylor Momsen, Amy Adams, Brad Garrett, John Slattery, Samantha Bee, Susie Castillo, Frank L. Ridley, Ezra Buzzington, Jay Leno, Phil Morris, Michael Massee, Cam Clarke, John DiMaggio, Danny Mastrogiorgio, Jess Harnell, Joseph Bucaro III, Stuart Wilson	
A U G U S T	8	Daddy Day Camp	TriStar Pictures / Revolution Studios	Fred Savage (director); Geoff Rodkey, J. David Stem, David N. Weiss (screenplay); Cuba Gooding Jr., Lochlyn Munro, Richard Gant, Tamala Jones, Paul Rae, Brian Doyle-Murray, Spencir Bridges, Josh McLerran, Dallin Boyce, Telise Galanis, Molly Jepson, Sean Patrick Flaherty, Taggart Hurtubise, Tad D'Agostino, Tyger Rawlings, Talon G. Ackerman, Jennifer Lyon	
A U G U S T	10	2 Days in Paris	Samuel Goldwyn Films	Julie Delpy (director/screenplay); Julie Delpy, Adam Goldberg, Daniel Brühl, Albert Delpy, Alexia Landeau, Adán Jodorowsky, Vanessa Seward, Marie Pillet, Alex Nahon, Thibault De Lussy	
A U G U S T	10	Rocket Science	Picturehouse / HBO Films	Jeffrey Blitz (director/screenplay); Reece Thompson, Anna Kendrick, Nicholas D'Agosto, Vincent Piazza, Aaron Yoo, Margo Martindale, Denis O'Hare, Maury Ginsberg, Jonah Hill, Dan Cashman, Michael J. Kusnir, Josh Kay	
A U G U S T	10	Rush Hour 3	New Line Cinema / Arthur Sarkissian Productions / Roger Birnbaum Productions	Brett Ratner (director); Jeff Nathanson (screenplay); Jackie Chan, Chris Tucker, Max von Sydow, Hiroyuki Sanada, Yvan Attal, Youki Kudoh, Noémie Lenoir, Zhang Jingchu, Tzi Ma, Roman Polanski, Philip Baker Hall, Dana Ivey, Henry O, Mia Tyler, Sarah Shahi, David Niven Jr., Sun Mingming, Julie Depardieu	
A U G U S T	10	Skinwalkers	After Dark Films	James Isaac (director); James DeMonaco, Todd Harthan, James Roday (screenplay); Jason Behr, Elias Koteas, Rhona Mitra, Kim Coates, Natassia Malthe, Sarah Carter, Lyriq Bent, Tom Jackson, Matthew Knight, Rogue Johnston, Barbara Gordon, Shawn Roberts	
A U G U S T	10	Stardust	Paramount Pictures	Matthew Vaughn (director/screenplay); Jane Goldman (screenplay); Claire Danes, Michelle Pfeiffer, Robert De Niro, Charlie Cox, Sienna Miller, Ricky Gervais, Jason Flemyng, Rupert Everett, Ian McKellen, Peter O'Toole, Mark Strong, Kate Magowan, Joanna Scanlan, Sarah Alexander, Mark Heap, Julian Rhind-Tutt, Adam Buxton, David Walliams, Nathaniel Parker, Ben Barnes, Henry Cavill, David Kelly, Melanie Hill, Mark Williams, Jake Curran, Olivia Grant, George Innes, Dexter Fletcher, Eliot (Coco) Sumner, Mark Burns	
A U G U S T	15	Delirious	Peace Arch Entertainment	Tom DiCillo (director/screenplay); Steve Buscemi, Michael Pitt, Alison Lohman, Gina Gershon, Callie Thorne, Kevin Corrigan, Richard Short, Elvis Costello, David Wain, Mel Gorham, Peter Appel, Cinqué Lee, Kevin Phillips, Rodrigo Lopresti, Melissa Rauch, Dennis Parlato, Jeff Branson, Amy Hargreaves, Juani Feliz, Jack Gwaltney, Kristina Klebe, Phillip Bloch, Tobias Truvillion, Tom Aldredge, Doris Belack, Lynn Cohen, Joe D'Onofrio, Kristen Schaal, Marcus Collins, Minnie Driver, Ronald Guttman	
A U G U S T	17	Death at a Funeral	MGM Distribution Co.	Frank Oz (director); Dean Craig (screenplay); Matthew Macfadyen, Rupert Graves, Andy Nyman, Kris Marshall, Peter Dinklage, Keeley Hawes, Daisy Donovan, Alan Tudyk, Ewen Bremner, Peter Vaughan, Thomas Wheatley, Jane Asher, Peter Egan	
A U G U S T	17	The 11th Hour	Warner Independent Pictures / Appian Way	Nadia Conners, Leila Conners Petersen (directors/screenplay); Leonardo DiCaprio (screenplay); Leonardo DiCaprio, Kenny Ausubel, Thom Hartmann, Wangari Maathai, Sandra Postel, Paul Stamets, David W. Orr, Stephen Hawking, Oren Lyons, Andrew C. Revkin, Sylvia Earle, Paul Hawken, Janine Benyus, Stuart Pimm, Paolo Soleri, David Suzuki, James Hillman, James Parks Morton, Nathan Gardels, Wes Jackson, Joseph Tainter, Richard Heinberg, James Woolsey, Vijay Vaitheeswaran, Stephen Schneider, Bill McKibben, Sheila Watt-Cloutier, Ray Anderson, Diane Wilson, Andrew Weil, Theo Colborn, Jeremy Jackson, Tzeporah Berman, Mikhail Gorbachev, Michel Gelobter, Lester Brown, Herman Daly, Wade Davis, Jerry Mander, William McDonough, Bruce Mau, John Todd, Leo Gerard, Peter Warshall, Andy Lipkis, Brock Dolman, Peter de Menocal, Tim Carmichael, Omar Freilla, Wallace J. Nichols, Gloria Flora, Thomas Linzey, Betsy Taylor, Rick Fedrizzi, Greg Watson, Mathew Petersen	
A U G U S T	17	High School Musical 2	Disney–ABC Domestic Television	Kenny Ortega (director); Peter Barsocchini (screenplay); Zac Efron, Vanessa Hudgens, Lucas Grabeel, Ashley Tisdale, Corbin Bleu, Monique Coleman, Mark L. Taylor, Bart Johnson, Jessica Tuck, Robert Curtis Brown, Alyson Reed, Chris Warren Jr., Ryne Sanborn, Olesya Rulin, Kaycee Stroh, Tanya Chisholm, Leslie Wing Pomeroy, Kelli Baker, McCall Clark, Shane Harper, Miley Cyrus	
A U G U S T	17	The Invasion	Warner Bros. Pictures / Village Roadshow Pictures / Silver Pictures	Oliver Hirschbiegel (director); David Kajganich (screenplay); Nicole Kidman, Daniel Craig, Jeremy Northam, Jeffrey Wright, Jackson Bond, Veronica Cartwright, Josef Sommer, Celia Weston, Roger Rees, Adam LeFevre, Joanna Merlin, Malin Åkerman, Susan Floyd, Eric Benjamin, Stephanie Berry, Alexis Raben, Jeff Wincott	
A U G U S T	17	Superbad	Columbia Pictures / Apatow Productions	Greg Mottola (director); Seth Rogen, Evan Goldberg (screenplay); Jonah Hill, Michael Cera, Christopher Mintz-Plasse, Seth Rogen, Bill Hader, Emma Stone, Martha MacIsaac, Laura Marano, Aviva Baumann, Joe Lo Truglio, Kevin Corrigan, Dave Franco, Stacy Edwards, David Krumholtz, Martin Starr, Ben Best, Lauren Miller, Steve Bannos, Carla Gallo, Clark Duke, Danny McBride	
A U G U S T	17	Marigold	Adlabs Films / Hyperion Pictures	Willard Carroll (director); Salman Khan, Ali Larter, Nandana Sen	
A U G U S T	24	Dedication	The Weinstein Company / First Look Pictures	Justin Theroux (director); David Bromberg (screenplay); Billy Crudup, Mandy Moore, Tom Wilkinson, Christine Taylor, Bob Balaban, Catherine Lloyd Burns, Amy Sedaris, Cassidy Hinkle, Jeremy Shamos, Christopher Fitzgerald, Dianne Wiest, Jicky Schnee, Martin Freeman, Catherine Kellner, Bobby Cannavale, Peter Bogdanovich, Justin Theroux	
A U G U S T	24	The Hottest State	THINKFilm	Ethan Hawke (director/screenplay); Mark Webber, Catalina Sandino Moreno, Michelle Williams, Laura Linney, Ethan Hawke, Daniel Ross, Alexandra Daddario, Cherami Leigh, Glen Powell, Sônia Braga, Anne Clarke	
A U G U S T	24	The Nanny Diaries	The Weinstein Company / Metro Goldwyn Mayer	Shari Springer Berman, Robert Pulcini (directors/screenplay); Scarlett Johansson, Laura Linney, Alicia Keys, Chris Evans, Donna Murphy, Paul Giamatti, Nicholas Art, Nina Garbiras, Brande Roderick, Heather Simms, Julie White, Judith Roberts	
A U G U S T	24	Resurrecting the Champ	Yari Film Group	Rod Lurie (director); Michael Bortman, Allison Burnett (screenplay); Samuel L. Jackson, Josh Hartnett, Kathryn Morris, Alan Alda, Rachel Nichols, David Paymer, Teri Hatcher, Dakota Goyo, Kristen Shaw, Nick Sandow, Harry J. Lennix	
A U G U S T	24	September Dawn	Slowhand Cinema	Christopher Cain (director/screenplay); Carole Whang Schutter (screenplay); Jon Voight, Trent Ford, Tamara Hope, Terence Stamp, Dean Cain, Jon Gries, Taylor Handley, Lolita Davidovich, Shaun Johnston, Huntley Ritter	
A U G U S T	24	War	Lionsgate	Philip G. Atwell (director); Lee Anthony Smith, Gregory J. Bradley (screenplay); Jet Li, Jason Statham, John Lone, Devon Aoki, Luis Guzmán, Saul Rubinek, Ryo Ishibashi, Sung Kang, Mathew St. Patrick, Nadine Velazquez, Terry Chen, Mark Cheng, Nicholas Elia, Kennedy Lauren Montano, Steph Song, Andrea Roth, Kenneth Choi, Angela Fong, Kane Kosugi, Dario Delacio	
A U G U S T	29	Balls of Fury	Rogue Pictures / Intrepid Pictures / Spyglass Entertainment	Robert Ben Garant (director/screenplay); Thomas Lennon (screenplay); Dan Fogler, Christopher Walken, George Lopez, Maggie Q, James Hong, Thomas Lennon, Robert Patrick, Jason Scott Lee, Aisha Tyler, Diedrich Bader, Cary-Hiroyuki Tagawa, Terry Crews, Patton Oswalt, David Koechner, Toby Huss, Heather DeLoach, Kerri Kenney-Silver, Mather Zickel, Jim Rash, David Proval, Masi Oka, Irina Voronina, Darryl Chan, Jim Lampley	
A U G U S T	31	Death Sentence	20th Century Fox / Hyde Park Entertainment	James Wan (director); Ian Mackenzie Jeffers (screenplay); Kevin Bacon, Garrett Hedlund, Kelly Preston, Aisha Tyler, John Goodman, Matt O'Leary, Leigh Whannell, Stuart Lafferty, Zachary Dylan Smith, Jordan Garrett, Edi Gathegi, Yorgo Constantine, Hector Atreyu Ruiz, Kanin Howell, Judith Roberts	
A U G U S T	31	Halloween	Metro-Goldwyn-Mayer / Dimension Films	Rob Zombie (director/screenplay); Malcolm McDowell, Sheri Moon Zombie, Tyler Mane, Scout Taylor-Compton, Brad Dourif, Danielle Harris, William Forsythe, Richard Lynch, Udo Kier, Clint Howard, Danny Trejo, Lew Temple, Tom Towles, Bill Moseley, Leslie Easterbrook, Skyler Gisondo, Hanna R. Hall, Kristina Klebe, Adam Weisman, Dee Wallace Stone, Max Van Ville, Nick Mennell, Pat Skipper, Daryl Sabara, Ken Foree, Sybil Danning, Micky Dolenz, Daniel Roebuck, Sid Haig, Daeg Faerch, Ezra Buzzington, Richard Fancy, Courtney Gains, John DeMita, Steve Boyles, Jenny Gregg Stewart, Richmond Arquette, Paul Kampf, Mel Fair	
S E P T E M B E R	5	I Want Someone to Eat Cheese With	IFC Films / The Weinstein Company	Jeff Garlin (director/screenplay); Jeff Garlin, Sarah Silverman, Bonnie Hunt, Amy Sedaris, David Pasquesi, Wallace Langham, Joey Slotnick, Richard Kind, Roger Bart, Dan Castellaneta, Elle Fanning, Tim Kazurinsky, Paul Mazursky, Rose Abdoo, Jessy Schram, Henriette Mantel, Phyllis Smith, Scott Adsit, Helen Slayton-Hughes, Steve Dahl, Aaron Carter, Gina Gershon, Antoine McKay, Maribeth Monroe, Jean Villepique, Mina Kolb, Rebecca Sage Allen, Brian Boland, Claudia Michelle Wallace	
S E P T E M B E R	7	3:10 to Yuma	Lionsgate / Relativity Media	James Mangold (director); Halsted Welles, Michael Brandt, Derek Haas (screenplay); Russell Crowe, Christian Bale, Peter Fonda, Gretchen Mol, Ben Foster, Dallas Roberts, Alan Tudyk, Vinessa Shaw, Logan Lerman, Kevin Durand, Luce Rains, Luke Wilson, Lennie Loftin, Marcus Sylvester, Carmilla Blakney, Rio Alexander	
S E P T E M B E R	7	The Hunting Party	The Weinstein Company	Richard Shepard (director/screenplay); Richard Gere, Terrence Howard, Jesse Eisenberg, Ljubomir Kerekeš, Diane Kruger, James Brolin, Dylan Baker, Kristina Krepela, Aleksandra Grdić, Mark Ivanir, Goran Kostić, Miraj Grbić, Joy Bryant, Nitin Ganatra, Zdravko Kocevar, Snežana Marković, R. Mahalakshmi Devaraj, Damir Saban	
S E P T E M B E R	7	Shoot 'Em Up	New Line Cinema	Michael Davis (director/screenplay); Clive Owen, Paul Giamatti, Monica Bellucci, Stephen McHattie, Christian Cage, Greg Bryk, Daniel Pilon, Ramona Pringle, Julian Richings, Stephen R. Hart	
S E P T E M B E R	14	The Brave One	Warner Bros. Pictures / Village Roadshow Pictures / Silver Pictures	Neil Jordan (director); Roderick Taylor, Bruce A. Taylor, Cynthia Mort (screenplay); Jodie Foster, Terrence Howard, Naveen Andrews, Nicky Katt, Zoë Kravitz, Mary Steenburgen, Luis Da Silva, Jane Adams, John Magaro, Carmen Ejogo, James Biberi, Lenny Venito, Larry Fessenden, Dana Eskelson	
S E P T E M B E R	14	D-War	Freestyle Releasing	Shim Hyung-rae (director/screenplay); Jason Behr, Amanda Brooks, Robert Forster, Chris Mulkey, Elizabeth Peña, Craig Robinson, Aimee Garcia, John Ales, Billy Gardell, Cody Arens, Cheyenne Alexis Dean	
S E P T E M B E R	14	In the Valley of Elah	Warner Independent Pictures	Paul Haggis (director/screenplay); Tommy Lee Jones, Charlize Theron, Susan Sarandon, James Franco, Jonathan Tucker, Frances Fisher, Josh Brolin, Jason Patric, Brent Briscoe, Greg Serano, Barry Corbin, Brent Sexton, Zoe Kazan, Wes Chatham, Glenn Taranto, Jake McLaughlin, Sean Huze, Mehcad Brooks, Rick Gonzalez, Jo Harvey Allen, Wayne Duvall, Victor Wolf, Mike Hatfield, Arlin Alcala	
S E P T E M B E R	14	Mr. Woodcock	New Line Cinema	Craig Gillespie (director); Michael Carnes, Josh Gilbert (screenplay); Billy Bob Thornton, Seann William Scott, Susan Sarandon, Ethan Suplee, Amy Poehler, Melissa Sagemiller, Bill Macy, Tyra Banks, Melissa Leo, M. C. Gainey, Jennifer Aspen, Allisyn Ashley Arm	
S E P T E M B E R	21	The Assassination of Jesse James by the Coward Robert Ford	Warner Bros. Pictures / Virtual Studios / Scott Free Productions / Plan B Entertainment	Andrew Dominik (director/screenplay); Brad Pitt, Casey Affleck, Sam Shepard, Mary-Louise Parker, Paul Schneider, Jeremy Renner, Zooey Deschanel, Sam Rockwell, Garret Dillahunt, Alison Elliott, Ted Levine, James Carville, Pat Healy, Michael Parks, Tom Aldredge, Kailin See, Michael Copeman, Ron Hansen	
S E P T E M B E R	21	Good Luck Chuck	Lionsgate	Mark Helfrich (director); Josh Stolberg (screenplay); Dane Cook, Jessica Alba, Dan Fogler, Chelan Simmons, Lonny Ross, Ellia English, Annie Wood, Jodie Stewart, Michelle Harrison, Jodelle Ferland, Lindsay Maxwell, Crystal Lowe, Steve Bacic, Connor Price, Troy Gentile, Sasha Pieterse	
S E P T E M B E R	21	Into the Wild	Paramount Vantage / River Road Entertainment	Sean Penn (director/screenplay); Emile Hirsch, Marcia Gay Harden, William Hurt, Jena Malone, Catherine Keener, Brian H. Dierker, Vince Vaughn, Zach Galifianakis, Kristen Stewart, Hal Holbrook, Thure Lindhardt, Signe Egholm Olsen, Merritt Wever, Jim Gallien, Leonard Knight, R. D. Call, Cheryl Harrington	
S E P T E M B E R	21	The Jane Austen Book Club	Sony Pictures Classics	Robin Swicord (director/screenplay); Kathy Baker, Maria Bello, Marc Blucas, Emily Blunt, Amy Brenneman, Hugh Dancy, Maggie Grace, Jimmy Smits, Kevin Zegers, Lynn Redgrave, Nancy Travis, Parisa Fitz-Henley, Gwendoline Yeo, Myndy Crist	
S E P T E M B E R	21	Resident Evil: Extinction	Screen Gems	Russell Mulcahy (director); Paul W. S. Anderson (screenplay); Milla Jovovich, Oded Fehr, Ali Larter, Iain Glen, Ashanti, Mike Epps, Christopher Egan, Spencer Locke, Jason O'Mara, Madeline Carroll, Matthew Marsden, Linden Ashby, Joe Hursley	
S E P T E M B E R	21	Sydney White	Universal Pictures / Morgan Creek Productions	Joe Nussbaum (director); Chad Gomez Creasey (screenplay); Amanda Bynes, Sara Paxton, Matt Long, Jack Carpenter, Jeremy Howard, John Schneider, Crystal Hunt, Adam Hendershott, Danny Strong, Samm Levine, Arnie Pantoja, Donté Bonner, Brian Patrick Clarke, Libby Mintz, Lisandra Vazquez, Lauren Leech, Kierstin Koppel	
S E P T E M B E R	28	Feast of Love	Metro-Goldwyn-Mayer / Lakeshore Entertainment	Robert Benton (director); Allison Burnett, Charles Baxter (screenplay); Morgan Freeman, Greg Kinnear, Radha Mitchell, Billy Burke, Selma Blair, Alexa Davalos, Toby Hemingway, Jane Alexander, Fred Ward, Stana Katic, Erika Marozsán, Margo Martindale	
S E P T E M B E R	28	The Game Plan	Walt Disney Pictures	Andy Fickman (director); Nichole Millard, Kathryn Price (screenplay); Dwayne "The Rock" Johnson, Kyra Sedgwick, Morris Chestnut, Roselyn Sánchez, Madison Pettis, Paige Turco, Hayes MacArthur, Brian J. White, Jamal Duff, Lauren Storm, Gordon Clapp, Kate Nauta, Robert Torti, Marv Albert, Boomer Esiason, Steve Levy, Stuart Scott	
S E P T E M B E R	28	The Kingdom	Universal Pictures / Relativity Media	Peter Berg (director); Matthew Michael Carnahan (screenplay); Jamie Foxx, Chris Cooper, Jennifer Garner, Jason Bateman, Jeremy Piven, Danny Huston, Tim McGraw, Richard Jenkins, Ashraf Barhom, Ali Suliman, Kyle Chandler, Frances Fisher, Kelly AuCoin, Anna Deavere Smith	
S E P T E M B E R	28	Lust, Caution	Focus Features / River Road Entertainment / Haishang Films / Sil-Metropole Organisation / Shanghai Film Group	Ang Lee (director); Wang Hui-ling, James Schamus (screenplay); Tony Leung Chiu-wai, Tang Wei, Anupam Kher, Joan Chen, Wang Leehom, Shyam Pathak, Tou Chung-hua, Chin Kar-lok, Lawrence Ko, Fan Kuang-yao, Chu Chih-ying, Kao Ying-hsuan, Johnson Yuen, Akiko Takeshita, Hayato Fujiki	
S E P T E M B E R	28	Trade	Lionsgate / Centropolis Entertainment	Marco Kreuzpaintner (director); José Rivera (screenplay); Kevin Kline, Alicja Bachleda, Paulina Gaitán, Linda Emond, Zack Ward, Kate del Castillo, Tim Reid, Pasha D. Lychnikoff, Guillermo Iván, Christian Vázquez, Kathleen Gati, Anna Maria Horsford, Anthony Crivello, Larisa Eryomina, Cesar Ramos, Marco Pérez, Natalia Traven, José Sefami, Leland Pascual	
S E P T E M B E R	29	The Darjeeling Limited	Fox Searchlight Pictures	Wes Anderson (director/screenplay); Roman Coppola, Jason Schwartzman (screenplay); Owen Wilson, Adrien Brody, Jason Schwartzman, Bill Murray, Anjelica Huston, Natalie Portman, Amara Karan, Wallace Wolodarsky, Waris Ahluwalia, Irrfan Khan, Barbet Schroeder, Camilla Rutherford, Kumar Pallana	
S E P T E M B E R	30	Fierce People	Lions Gate Films / Autonomous Films	Griffin Dunne (director); Dirk Wittenborn (screenplay); Diane Lane, Donald Sutherland, Anton Yelchin, Kristen Stewart, Paz de la Huerta, Chris Evans, Elizabeth Perkins, Christopher Shyer, Garry Chalk, Ryan McDonald, Dirk Wittenborn, Will Lyman, Blu Mankuma, Dexter Bell, Kaleigh Day, Aaron Brooks, Teach Grant	

== October–December ==
Opening		Title	Production company	Cast and crew	Ref.
O C T O B E R	5	The Good Night	Yari Film Group	Jake Paltrow (director/screenplay); Martin Freeman, Penélope Cruz, Gwyneth Paltrow, Danny DeVito, Simon Pegg, Michael Gambon, Lucy DeVito, Keith Allen, Amanda Abbington, Stephen Graham, Jarvis Cocker, Amber Rose Sealey, Skye Bennett	
O C T O B E R	5	The Heartbreak Kid	DreamWorks Pictures / Davis Entertainment	Peter Farrelly, Bobby Farrelly (directors/screenplay); Scot Armstrong, Leslie Dixon, Kevin Barnett (screenplay); Ben Stiller, Michelle Monaghan, Malin Åkerman, Jerry Stiller, Rob Corddry, Carlos Mencia, Scott Wilson, Danny McBride, Ali Hillis, Amy Sloan, Stephanie Courtney, Polly Holliday, Eva Longoria Parker, Lauren Bowles, Roy Jenkins, Kayla Kleevage, Luis Accinelli, Jerry Sherman	
O C T O B E R	5	The Polar Express (re-release)	Warner Bros. Pictures / Castle Rock Entertainment / Shangri-La Entertainment / ImageMovers / Playtone	Robert Zemeckis (director/screenplay); William Broyles Jr. (screenplay); Tom Hanks, Daryl Sabara, Josh Hutcherson, Michael Jeter, André Sogliuzzo, Eddie Deezen, Jimmy 'Jax' Pinchak, Nona Gaye, Tinashe, Peter Scolari, Jimmy Bennett, Matthew Hall, Chris Coppola, Phil Fondacaro, Debbie Lee Carrington, Ed Gale, Mark Povinelli, Charles Fleischer, Steven Tyler, Jon Scott, Mark Goodman, Dylan Cash, Connor Matheus, Julene Renee, Brendan King, Andy Pellick, Josh Eli, Rolandas Hendricks, Sean Scott, Mark Mendonca, Gregory Gast, Gordon Hart, Leslie Zemeckis, Isabella Peregrina, Ashly Holloway, Chantel Valdivieso, Meagan Moore, Hayden McFarland	
O C T O B E R	5	The Seeker	20th Century Fox / Walden Media	David L. Cunningham (director); John Hodge (screenplay); Alexander Ludwig, Christopher Eccleston, Ian McShane, Frances Conroy, James Cosmo, Jim Piddock, Amelia Warner, John Benjamin Hickey, Wendy Crewson, Emma Lockhart, Drew Tyler Bell, Edmund Entin, Gregory Smith, Gary Entin, Jordan J. Dale	
O C T O B E R	12	Across the Universe	Columbia Pictures / Revolution Studios	Julie Taymor (director); Dick Clement, Ian La Frenais (screenplay); Evan Rachel Wood, Jim Sturgess, Joe Anderson, Dana Fuchs, Martin Luther McCoy, T.V. Carpio, Spencer Liff, Lisa Hogg, Angela Mounsey, Robert Clohessy, Dylan Baker, Linda Emond, Lynn Cohen, Bill Irwin, Timothy T. Mitchum, Carol Woods, Joe Cocker, Jacob Pitts, Harry Lennix, Logan Marshall-Green, James Urbaniak, Bono, Daniel Ezralow, Eddie Izzard, Arabella Holzbog, Ekaterina Sknarina, Salma Hayek	
O C T O B E R	12	The Final Season	Yari Film Group	David Mickey Evans (director); Art D'Alessandro (screenplay); Sean Astin, Powers Boothe, Rachael Leigh Cook, Tom Arnold, Michael Angarano, Brett Claywell, Marshall Bell, Danielle Savre, James Gammon, Jesse Henecke, Larry Miller, Roscoe Myrick, Chris Olsen, Angela Paton, Nick Livingston, Ryan Flood, Nick Schmitt, Nathan Pyan, Josh Merino, Ryan Birkicht, Chris Jay Becker	
O C T O B E R	12	Lars and the Real Girl	Metro-Goldwyn-Mayer / Sidney Kimmel Entertainment	Craig Gillespie (director); Nancy Oliver (screenplay); Ryan Gosling, Emily Mortimer, Paul Schneider, Kelli Garner, Patricia Clarkson, R. D. Reid, Nancy Beatty, Doug Lennox, Joe Bostick, Liz Gordon, Nicky Guadagni, Karen Robinson, Maxwell McCabe-Lokos, Billy Parrott, Sally Cahill, Angela Vint, Liisa Repo-Martell, Boyd Banks, Darren Hynes, Victor Gómez, Tommy Chang, Arnold Pinnock, Joshua Peace, Aurora Browne, Alec McClure, Tannis Burnett, Lauren Ash, Lindsey Connell	
O C T O B E R	12	Michael Clayton	Warner Bros. Pictures / Castle Rock Entertainment / Mirage Enterprises	Tony Gilroy (director/screenplay); George Clooney, Tom Wilkinson, Tilda Swinton, Sydney Pollack, Michael O'Keefe, Sean Cullen, Ken Howard, Merritt Wever, Austin Williams, Denis O'Hare, Julie White, Robert Prescott, Terry Serpico, Katherine Waterston	
O C T O B E R	12	Sleuth	Sony Pictures Classics / Castle Rock Entertainment	Kenneth Branagh (director); Harold Pinter (screenplay); Michael Caine, Jude Law, Kenneth Branagh, Harold Pinter, Carmel O'Sullivan	
O C T O B E R	12	We Own the Night	Columbia Pictures / 2929 Productions	James Gray (director/screenplay); Joaquin Phoenix, Mark Wahlberg, Eva Mendes, Robert Duvall, Alex Veadov, Dominic Colon, Danny Hoch, Oleg Taktarov, Moni Moshonov, Antoni Corone, Craig Walker, Tony Musante, Yelena Solovey, Coati Mundi, Ed Koch	
O C T O B E R	12	Why Did I Get Married?	Lionsgate / Tyler Perry Studios	Tyler Perry (director/screenplay); Tyler Perry, Janet Jackson, Jill Scott, Malik Yoba, Sharon Leal, Tasha Smith, Michael Jai White, Richard T. Jones, Lamman Rucker, Denise Boutte, Keesha Sharp, Kaira Whitehead	
O C T O B E R	16	Return to House on Haunted Hill	Warner Premiere / Dark Castle Home Entertainment	Víctor Garcia (director); William Massa (screenplay); Amanda Righetti, Cerina Vincent, Erik Palladino, Tom Riley, Andrew Lee Potts, Jeffrey Combs, Steven Pacey, Andrew Pleavin, Chucky Venice, Kalita Rainford, Gil Kolirin, Stilyana Mitkova	
O C T O B E R	19	30 Days of Night	Columbia Pictures / Ghost House Pictures	David Slade (director); Steve Niles, Stuart Beattie, Brian Nelson (screenplay); Josh Hartnett, Melissa George, Danny Huston, Ben Foster, Mark Boone Junior, Mark Rendall, Amber Sainsbury, Manu Bennett, Megan Franich, Joel Tobeck, Elizabeth Hawthorne, Nathaniel Lees, Craig Hall, Chic Littlewood, Peter Feeney, Andrew Stehlin, John Rawls, Jared Turner, Kelson Henderson, Pua Magasiva, Grant Tilly, Rachel Maitland-Smith, Kate Elliott, Jacob Tomuri	
O C T O B E R	19	The Comebacks	Fox Atomic	Tom Brady (director); Ed Yeager, Joey Gutierrez (screenplay); David Koechner, Carl Weathers, Melora Hardin, Brooke Nevin, Robert Ri'chard, Noureen DeWulf, Matthew Lawrence, Nick Searcy, Jackie Long, Jesse Garcia, George Back, Martin Spanjers, Jermaine Williams, Jillian Grace, Chauntal Lewis, Eric Christian Olsen, Andy Dick, Dennis Rodman, Bradley Cooper, Dax Shepard, Jon Gries, Will Arnett, Kerri Kenney-Silver, Lawrence Taylor, Michael Irvin, Eric Dickerson, Stacy Keibler, Drew Lachey, Jason Sklar, Randy Sklar, Frank Caliendo	
O C T O B E R	19	Gone Baby Gone	Miramax Films	Ben Affleck (director/screenplay); Aaron Stockard (screenplay); Casey Affleck, Michelle Monaghan, Morgan Freeman, Ed Harris, John Ashton, Amy Ryan, Amy Madigan, Titus Welliver, Slaine, Edi Gathegi, Mark Margolis, Michael Kenneth Williams, Jill Quigg, Raymond "Ray" Alongi, Madeline O'Brien	
O C T O B E R	19	Rendition	New Line Cinema / Level 1 Entertainment	Gavin Hood (director); Kelley Sane (screenplay); Jake Gyllenhaal, Reese Witherspoon, Peter Sarsgaard, Alan Arkin, Meryl Streep, Omar Metwally, Aramis Knight, Rosie Malek-Yonan, Moa Khouas, Zineb Oukach, Yigal Naor, J. K. Simmons, Bob Gunton, Hadar Ratzon, Raymonde Amsalem, Simon Abkarian, Wendy Phillips, Christian Martin	
O C T O B E R	19	Reservation Road	Focus Features	Terry George (director/screenplay); John Burnham Schwartz (screenplay); Joaquin Phoenix, Mark Ruffalo, Jennifer Connelly, Mira Sorvino, Elle Fanning, Eddie Alderson, Sean Curley, Antoni Corone	
O C T O B E R	19	Sarah Landon and the Paranormal Hour	Freestyle Releasing	Lisa Comrie (director); John Comrie (screenplay); Rissa Walters, Brian Comrie, Dan Comrie, Alessandra Daniele, Rusty Hanes, Rick Comrie, Michael A. Evans, Nicole Des Coteaux, Sylvia Enrique, Jane Harris, Dave Lindley, Kendell Lindley, Dakota Jade	
O C T O B E R	19	The Nightmare Before Christmas (3D re-release)	Walt Disney Pictures / Touchstone Pictures	Henry Selick (director); Caroline Thompson, Michael McDowell (screenplay); Danny Elfman, Chris Sarandon, Catherine O'Hara, William Hickey, Glenn Shadix, Ken Page, Ed Ivory, Paul Reubens, Kerry Katz, Carmen Twillie, Randy Crenshaw, Debi Durst, Glenn Walters, Sherwood Ball, John Morris, Greg Proops	
O C T O B E R	19	The Ten Commandments	Promenade Pictures	John Stronach, Bill Boyce (directors); Ed Naha (screenplay); Ben Kingsley, Christian Slater, Alfred Molina, Elliott Gould, Scott McNeil, Christopher Gaze, Kathleen Barr, Lee Tockar, Matt Hill, Tabitha St. Germain, Trevor Devall, Brian Dobson, Garry Chalk, Jane Mortifee, Nico Ghisi, Colin Murdock	
O C T O B E R	19	Things We Lost in the Fire	DreamWorks Pictures	Susanne Bier (director); Allan Loeb (screenplay); Halle Berry, Benicio del Toro, David Duchovny, John Carroll Lynch, Alison Lohman, Robin Weigert, Omar Benson Miller, Liam James, Alexis Llewellyn, Micah Berry	
O C T O B E R	19	Wristcutters: A Love Story	Autonomous Films	Goran Dukić (director/screenplay); Patrick Fugit, Shannyn Sossamon, Shea Whigham, Leslie Bibb, Tom Waits, Mark Boone Junior, Will Arnett, Nick Offerman, Mary Pat Gleason, John Hawkes, Jake Busey, Sarah Roemer, Abraham Benrubi, Clayne Crawford, Chase Ellison, Amy Seimetz, Azura Skye, Azazel Jacobs, Alicia Warrington, Bonnie Aarons, Goran Dukić, Ernst Gossner, Chris Hanley, Irwin Keyes, Jonathan Schwartz, Jazzmun, Eddie Steeples, Mikal P. Lazarev, Aaron Mouser, Anatol Rezmeritza	
O C T O B E R	26	Rails & Ties	Warner Bros. Pictures	Alison Eastwood (director); Micky Levy (screenplay); Kevin Bacon, Marcia Gay Harden, Marin Hinkle, Eugene Byrd, Miles Heizer	
O C T O B E R	26	Before the Devil Knows You're Dead	ThinkFilm	Sidney Lumet (director); Kelly Masterson (screenplay); Philip Seymour Hoffman, Ethan Hawke, Marisa Tomei, Albert Finney, Rosemary Harris, Brian F. O'Byrne, Aleksa Palladino, Michael Shannon, Amy Ryan, Damon Gupton, Jordan Gelber, Adrian Martinez, Leonardo Cimino, Tom Zolandz, Sarah Livingston	
O C T O B E R	26	Dan in Real Life	Touchstone Pictures / Focus Features	Peter Hedges (director/screenplay); Pierce Gardner (screenplay); Steve Carell, Juliette Binoche, Dianne Wiest, John Mahoney, Dane Cook, Alison Pill, Brittany Robertson, Marlene Lawston, Norbert Leo Butz, Jessica Hecht, Amy Ryan, Frank Wood, Emily Blunt, Felipe Dieppa, Bernie McInerney, Amy Landecker, Matthew Morrison, Stephen Mellor, CJ Adams, Shana Carr, Lucas Hedges	
O C T O B E R	26	Saw IV	Lionsgate / Twisted Pictures	Darren Lynn Bousman (director); Patrick Melton, Marcus Dunstan (screenplay); Tobin Bell, Scott Patterson, Costas Mandylor, Betsy Russell, Lyriq Bent, Athena Karkanis, Justin Louis, Donnie Wahlberg, Angus Macfadyen, Shawnee Smith, Bahar Soomekh, Dina Meyer, Mike Realba, Marty Adams, Simon Reynolds, Sarain Boylan, Billy Otis, James Van Patten, Kevin Rushton, Julian Richings, Ingrid Hart, Niamh Wilson, Janet Land, Ron Lea, Tony Nappo, Emmanuelle Vaugier, Noam Jenkins, Mike Butters, J. Larose, Oren Koules, Alison Luther	
N O V E M B E R	2	American Gangster	Universal Pictures / Imagine Entertainment / Relativity Media / Scott Free Productions	Ridley Scott (director); Steven Zaillian (screenplay); Denzel Washington, Russell Crowe, Chiwetel Ejiofor, Cuba Gooding Jr., Josh Brolin, Ted Levine, Armand Assante, John Ortiz, John Hawkes, RZA, Lymari Nadal, Yul Vazquez, Ruby Dee, Idris Elba, Carla Gugino, Joe Morton, Common, Ritchie Coster, Jon Polito, Kevin Corrigan, Roger Guenveur Smith, Malcolm Goodwin, Ric Young, Roger Bart, Tip 'T.I.' Harris, KaDee Strickland, Ruben Santiago-Hudson, Norman Reedus, Clarence Williams III	
N O V E M B E R	2	Bee Movie	Paramount Pictures / DreamWorks Animation	Simon J. Smith, Steve Hickner (directors); Jerry Seinfeld, Andy Robin, Barry Marder, Spike Feresten (screenplay); Jerry Seinfeld, Renée Zellweger, Matthew Broderick, Patrick Warburton, John Goodman, Chris Rock, Kathy Bates, Barry Levinson, Larry King, Ray Liotta, Sting, Oprah Winfrey, Larry Miller, Megan Mullally, Rip Torn, Michael Richards, Mario Joyner, Jim Cummings, Tom Papa, Andy Robin, Conrad Vernon, David Herman, Carol Leifer, Jeff Altman, Tress MacNeille, Simon J. Smith, Geoff Witcher, John DiMaggio, Barry Marder, Bobby Jacoby, Carl Kasell	
N O V E M B E R	2	Martian Child	New Line Cinema	Menno Meyjes (director); Seth E. Bass, Jonathan Tolins (screenplay); John Cusack, Amanda Peet, Sophie Okonedo, Oliver Platt, Joan Cusack, Bobby Coleman, Anjelica Huston, Richard Schiff, Howard Hesseman, David Kaye	
N O V E M B E R	9	Fred Claus	Warner Bros. Pictures / Silver Pictures	David Dobkin (director); Dan Fogelman (screenplay); Vince Vaughn, Paul Giamatti, Miranda Richardson, John Michael Higgins, Elizabeth Banks, Rachel Weisz, Kathy Bates, Kevin Spacey, Trevor Peacock, Bobb'e J. Thompson, Chris 'Ludacris' Bridges, Allan Corduner, Frank Stallone, Roger Clinton Jr., Stephen Baldwin, Dylan Minnette, Jeffrey Dean Morgan, Liam James, Theo Stevenson	
N O V E M B E R	9	Lions for Lambs	Metro-Goldwyn-Mayer / United Artists	Robert Redford (director); Matthew Michael Carnahan (screenplay); Robert Redford, Meryl Streep, Tom Cruise, Michael Peña, Andrew Garfield, Derek Luke, Peter Berg, Kevin Dunn	
N O V E M B E R	9	No Country for Old Men	Miramax Films / Paramount Vantage / Mike Zoss Productions	Joel and Ethan Coen (directors/screenplay); Tommy Lee Jones, Javier Bardem, Josh Brolin, Woody Harrelson, Kelly Macdonald, Garret Dillahunt, Tess Harper, Barry Corbin, Stephen Root, Rodger Boyce, Beth Grant, Ana Reeder, Gene Jones, Myk Watford, Kathy Lamkin, Margaret Bowman, Thomas Kopache, Jason Douglas, Rutherford Cravens, Luce Rains, Josh Blaylock, Caleb Jones	
N O V E M B E R	9	P2	Summit Entertainment	Franck Khalfoun (director/screenplay); Alexandre Aja, Grégory Levasseur (screenplay); Rachel Nichols, Wes Bentley, Simon Reynolds, Philip Akin, Stephanie Moore, Miranda Edwards, Paul Sun-Hyung Lee, Grace Lynn Kung, Philip Williams, Arnold Pinnock	
N O V E M B E R	14	Southland Tales	Destination Films / Samuel Goldwyn Films	Richard Kelly (director/screenplay); Dwayne Johnson, Seann William Scott, Sarah Michelle Gellar, Mandy Moore, Justin Timberlake, Miranda Richardson, Wallace Shawn, Bai Ling, Nora Dunn, John Larroquette, Kevin Smith, Todd Berger, Wood Harris, Cheri Oteri, Jon Lovitz, Jill Ritchie, Amy Poehler, Lou Taylor Pucci, Curtis Armstrong, Beth Grant, Christopher Lambert, Zelda Rubinstein, Will Sasso, Kevin Robertson, Lisa K. Wyatt, Janeane Garofalo, Holmes Osborne, Abbey McBride	
N O V E M B E R	16	Beowulf	Paramount Pictures / Shangri-La Entertainment / ImageMovers	Robert Zemeckis (director); Neil Gaiman, Roger Avary (screenplay); Ray Winstone, Anthony Hopkins, John Malkovich, Robin Wright Penn, Angelina Jolie, Brendan Gleeson, Crispin Glover, Alison Lohman, Costas Mandylor, Sebastian Roché, Greg Ellis, Tyler Steelman, Dominic Keating, Rik Young, Charlotte Salt, Leslie Harter Zemeckis, Fredrik Hiller	
N O V E M B E R	16	Love in the Time of Cholera	New Line Cinema	Mike Newell (director); Ronald Harwood (screenplay); Javier Bardem, Giovanna Mezzogiorno, Benjamin Bratt, John Leguizamo, Fernanda Montenegro, Catalina Sandino Moreno, Alicia Borrachero, Liev Schreiber, Laura Harring, Hector Elizondo, Ana Claudia Talancon, Angie Cepeda, Patricia Castañeda, Marcela Mar, Paola Turbay, Unax Ugalde	
N O V E M B E R	16	Margot at the Wedding	Paramount Vantage	Noah Baumbach (director/screenplay); Nicole Kidman, Jennifer Jason Leigh, Jack Black, John Turturro, Ciarán Hinds, Halley Feiffer, Seth Barrish, Michael Cullen, Enid Graham, Zane Pais, Flora Cross	
N O V E M B E R	16	Mr. Magorium's Wonder Emporium	20th Century Fox / Mandate Pictures / Walden Media	Zach Helm (director/screenplay); Dustin Hoffman, Natalie Portman, Jason Bateman, Zach Mills, Ted Ludzik, Kiele Sanchez, Jonathan Potts	
N O V E M B E R	21	August Rush	Warner Bros. Pictures	Kirsten Sheridan (director); Nick Castle, James V. Hart (screenplay); Freddie Highmore, Keri Russell, Jonathan Rhys Meyers, Terrence Howard, Robin Williams, Alex O'Loughlin, William Sadler, Marian Seldes, Jamia Simone Nash, Mykelti Williamson, Leon Thomas III, Bonnie McKee, Timothy Mitchum, Becki Newton, Aaron Staton, Ronald Guttman, Michael Drayer	
N O V E M B E R	21	Enchanted	Walt Disney Pictures / Right Coast Productions / Josephson Entertainment	Kevin Lima (director); Bill Kelly (screenplay); Amy Adams, Patrick Dempsey, James Marsden, Timothy Spall, Idina Menzel, Susan Sarandon, Rachel Covey, Elizabeth Mathis, Tonya Pinkins, Isiah Whitlock Jr., Tibor Feldman, Jodi Benson, Matt Servitto, John Rothman, Marlon Saunders, Michaela Conlin, Paige O'Hara, Danny Mastrogiorgio, Judy Kuhn, Joseph Siravo, Margaret Travolta, Jon McLaughlin, Helen Stenborg, Jeff Bennett, Kevin Lima, Emma Rose Lima, Teala Dunn, Fred Tatasciore, Julie Andrews	
N O V E M B E R	21	Hitman	20th Century Fox	Xavier Gens (director); Skip Woods (screenplay); Timothy Olyphant, Dougray Scott, Robert Knepper, Olga Kurylenko, Ulrich Thomsen, Henry Ian Cusick, Michael Offei, James Faulkner, Eriq Ebouaney, Emil Abossolo-Mbo, Lisa Jacobs, Sabine Crossen, Susan White, Asen Blatechki, Vladimir Kolev	
N O V E M B E R	21	I'm Not There	The Weinstein Company	Todd Haynes (director/screenplay); Oren Moverman (screenplay); Christian Bale, Cate Blanchett, Marcus Carl Franklin, Richard Gere, Heath Ledger, Ben Whishaw, Charlotte Gainsbourg, David Cross, Eugene Brotto, Bruce Greenwood, Julianne Moore, Michelle Williams, Mark Camacho, Benz Antoine, Craig Thomas, Richie Havens, Kim Roberts, Kris Kristofferson, Don Francks, Vito DeFilippo, Susan Glover, Paul Spence	
N O V E M B E R	21	The Mist	Metro-Goldwyn-Mayer / Dimension Films	Frank Darabont (director/screenplay); Thomas Jane, Marcia Gay Harden, Laurie Holden, Andre Braugher, Toby Jones, William Sadler, Jeffrey DeMunn, Frances Sternhagen, Alexa Davalos, Nathan Gamble, Chris Owen, Sam Witwer, Robert Treveiler, David Jensen, Melissa McBride, Andy Stahl, Buck Taylor, Juan Gabriel Pareja, Walter Fauntleroy, Brandon O'Dell, Jackson Hurst, Susan Watkins, Mathew Greer, Kelly Collins Lintz, Ron Clinton Smith	
N O V E M B E R	21	This Christmas	Screen Gems / Rainforest Films	Preston A. Whitmore II (director/screenplay); Delroy Lindo, Idris Elba, Loretta Devine, Chris Brown, Columbus Short, Regina King, Sharon Leal, Lauren London, Jessica Stroup, Keith Robinson, Mekhi Phifer, Laz Alonso, Ricky Harris, Lupe Ontiveros, David Banner, Ronnie Warner	
N O V E M B E R	23	Starting Out in the Evening	Roadside Attractions / Cinetic Media / InDigEnt	Andrew Wagner (director/screenplay); Fred Parnes (screenplay); Frank Langella, Lauren Ambrose, Lili Taylor, Adrian Lester, Michael Cumpsty, Jessica Hecht, Dennis Parlato, Jeff McCarthy	
N O V E M B E R	28	The Savages	Fox Searchlight Pictures	Tamara Jenkins (director/screenplay); Laura Linney, Philip Seymour Hoffman, Philip Bosco, Peter Friedman, Guy Boyd, Debra Monk, Margo Martindale, Rosemary Murphy, David Zayas, Gbenga Akinnagbe, Tonye Patano, Cara Seymour, Kristine Nielsen	
N O V E M B E R	30	Awake	The Weinstein Company	Joby Harold (director/screenplay); Hayden Christensen, Jessica Alba, Terrence Howard, Lena Olin, Nathalie Efron, Fisher Stevens, Arliss Howard, Christopher McDonald, Georgina Chapman, Sam Robards, Steven Hinkle	
N O V E M B E R	30	The Diving Bell and the Butterfly	Miramax Films / Pathé / Canal+ / The Kennedy/Marshall Company / France 3 Cinéma	Julian Schnabel (director); Ronald Harwood (screenplay); Mathieu Amalric, Emmanuelle Seigner, Marie-Josée Croze, Anne Consigny, Max von Sydow, Olatz López Garmendia, Patrick Chesnais, Isaach de Bankolé, Marina Hands, Niels Arestrup, Anne Alvaro, Zinedine Soualem, Emma de Caunes, Françoise Lebrun	
D E C E M B E R	5	Juno	Fox Searchlight Pictures	Jason Reitman (director); Diablo Cody (screenplay); Elliot Page, Michael Cera, Jennifer Garner, Jason Bateman, Allison Janney, J. K. Simmons, Olivia Thirlby, Rainn Wilson, Valerie Tian, Emily Perkins	
D E C E M B E R	7	The Amateurs	First Look Studios	Michael Traeger (director/screenplay); Jeff Bridges, Tim Blake Nelson, Joe Pantoliano, William Fichtner, Ted Danson, Patrick Fugit, Lauren Graham, Jeanne Tripplehorn, Isaiah Washington, Steven Weber, John Hawkes, Glenne Headly, Tom Bower, Alex D. Linz	
D E C E M B E R	7	The Golden Compass	New Line Cinema	Chris Weitz (director/screenplay); Nicole Kidman, Sam Elliott, Eva Green, Dakota Blue Richards, Daniel Craig, Jim Carter, Clare Higgins, Ben Walker, Charlie Rowe, Christopher Lee, Tom Courtenay, Derek Jacobi, Simon McBurney, Jack Shepherd, Magda Szubanski, Edward de Souza, Paul Antony-Barber, Jason Watkins, Hattie Morahan, Ian McKellen, Freddie Highmore, Ian McShane, Kathy Bates, Kristin Scott Thomas	
D E C E M B E R	7	Grace Is Gone	The Weinstein Company	James C. Strouse (director/screenplay); John Cusack, Alessandro Nivola, Marisa Tomei, Mary Kay Place, Gracie Bednarczyk, Shélan O'Keefe, Dana Lynne Gilhooley	
D E C E M B E R	7	Noëlle	Gener8Xion Entertainment	David Wall, Kerry Wall, Sean Patrick Brennan	
D E C E M B E R	12	The Perfect Holiday	Destination Films	Lance Rivera (director/screenplay); Jeff Stein, Marc Calixte, Nat Mauldin (screenplay); Morris Chestnut, Gabrielle Union, Charlie Murphy, Katt Williams, Faizon Love, Terrence Howard, Queen Latifah, Jill Marie Jones, Rachel True, Malik Hammond, Jeremy Gumbs, Khail Bryant	
D E C E M B E R	14	Alvin and the Chipmunks	20th Century Fox / Fox 2000 Pictures / Regency Enterprises	Tim Hill (director); Jon Vitti, Will McRobb, Chris Viscardi (screenplay); Jason Lee, David Cross, Cameron Richardson, Jane Lynch, Justin Long, Matthew Gray Gubler, Jesse McCartney, Kevin Symons, Beth Riesgraf, Adriane Lenox, Oliver Muirhead, Erin Chambers, Jillian Barberie, Ross Bagdasarian Jr., Janice Karman, Steve Vining, Frank Maharajh, Veronica Alicino	
D E C E M B E R	14	I Am Legend	Warner Bros. Pictures / Village Roadshow Pictures / Weed Road Pictures / Overbrook Entertainment	Francis Lawrence (director); Mark Protosevich, Akiva Goldsman (screenplay); Will Smith, Alice Braga, Dash Mihok, Charlie Tahan, Emma Thompson, Salli Richardson, Willow Smith, Marin Ireland, April Grace, Joanna Numata, Darrell Foster, Pat Fraley, Mike Patton	
D E C E M B E R	14	The Kite Runner	DreamWorks Pictures / Paramount Classics / Sidney Kimmel Entertainment / Participant Productions	Marc Forster (director); David Benioff (screenplay); Khalid Abdalla, Zekeria Ebrahimi, Ahmad Khan Mahmoodzada, Homayoun Ershadi, Atossa Leoni, Shaun Toub, Saïd Taghmaoui, Abdul Salaam Yusoufzai, Ali Danish Bakhtyari, Maimoona Ghezal, Abdul Qadir Farookh, Khaled Hosseini, Camilo Cuervo, Nasser Memarzia, Mohamed Amin Rahimi, Chris Verrill, Amar Kureishi, Nabi Tanha, Elham Ehsas	
D E C E M B E R	14	Youth Without Youth	Sony Pictures Classics	Francis Ford Coppola (director/screenplay); Tim Roth, Bruno Ganz, Alexandra Maria Lara, André Hennicke, Marcel Iureş, Adrian Pintea, Andrei Gheorghe, Matt Damon, Alexandra Pirici	
D E C E M B E R	21	Charlie Wilson's War	Universal Pictures / Relativity Media / Participant Productions / Playtone	Mike Nichols (director); Aaron Sorkin (screenplay); Tom Hanks, Julia Roberts, Philip Seymour Hoffman, Amy Adams, Ned Beatty, Christopher Denham, Emily Blunt, Om Puri, Faran Tahir, Ken Stott, John Slattery, Michael Spellman, Denis O'Hare, Jud Tylor, Peter Gerety, Brian Markinson, Spencer Garrett, Kevin Cooney, Aharon Ipalé, Pasha Lychnikoff, Cyia Batten, Tracy Phillips, Navid Negahban, Shiri Appleby, Rachel Nichols, Wynn Everett	
D E C E M B E R	21	National Treasure: Book of Secrets	Walt Disney Pictures / Jerry Bruckheimer Films	Jon Turteltaub (director); Cormac Wibberley, Marianne Wibberley (screenplay); Nicolas Cage, Jon Voight, Harvey Keitel, Ed Harris, Diane Kruger, Justin Bartha, Bruce Greenwood, Helen Mirren, Armando Riesco, Alicia Coppola, Albert Hall, Ty Burrell, Randy Travis, Joel Gretsch, Billy Unger, Christian Camargo, Zachary Gordon, Guillaume Gallienne, Scali Delpeyrat	
D E C E M B E R	21	P.S. I Love You	Warner Bros. Pictures / Alcon Entertainment	Richard LaGravenese (director/screenplay); Steven Rogers (screenplay); Hilary Swank, Gerard Butler, Lisa Kudrow, Gina Gershon, Jeffrey Dean Morgan, Kathy Bates, Harry Connick Jr., James Marsters, Nellie McKay, Dean Winters, Anne Kent, Brian McGrath, Sherie Rene Scott, Susan Blackwell, Michael Countryman	
D E C E M B E R	21	Sweeney Todd: The Demon Barber of Fleet Street	DreamWorks Pictures / Warner Bros. Pictures	Tim Burton (director); John Logan (screenplay); Johnny Depp, Helena Bonham Carter, Alan Rickman, Timothy Spall, Sacha Baron Cohen, Jayne Wisener, Jamie Campbell Bower, Laura Michelle Kelly, Ed Sanders, Anthony Stewart Head	
D E C E M B E R	21	Walk Hard: The Dewey Cox Story	Columbia Pictures / Relativity Media	Jake Kasdan (director/screenplay); Judd Apatow (screenplay); John C. Reilly, Jenna Fischer, Tim Meadows, Kristen Wiig, Raymond J. Barry, Margo Martindale, Chris Parnell, Matt Besser, Chip Hormess, Jonah Hill, David "Honeyboy" Edwards, David Krumholtz, Craig Robinson, Harold Ramis, Simon Helberg, Philip Rosenthal, Martin Starr, John Michael Higgins, Ed Helms, Jane Lynch, Tim Bagley, Angela Little Mackenzie, Skyler Gisondo, Molly C. Quinn, Lurie Poston, Jack McBrayer, Nat Faxon, Rance Howard, Odette Yustman, Frankie Muniz, John Ennis, Jack White, Adam Herschman, Patrick J. Adams, Paul Feig, Angela Correa, The Temptations, Eddie Vedder, Jackson Browne, Jewel, Ghostface Killah, Lyle Lovett, Gerry Bednob, Cheryl Tiegs, Paul Rudd, Jack Black, Justin Long, Jason Schwartzman, Patrick Duffy, Morgan Fairchild, Cheryl Ladd	
D E C E M B E R	25	Aliens vs. Predator: Requiem	20th Century Fox	The Brothers Strause (director); Shane Salerno (screenplay); Steven Pasquale, Reiko Aylesworth, Johnny Lewis, John Ortiz, Sam Trammell, Ariel Gade, Robert Joy, Kristen Hager, David Paetkau, Matt Ward, Michal Suchanek, David Hornsby, Gina Holden, Chris William Martin, Chelah Horsdal, Liam James, Tom McBeath, Ty Olsson, Rainbow Sun Francks, Françoise Yip, Kurt Max Runte, James Chutter, Tim Henry, Juan Riedinger, Dalias Blake, Curtis Caravaggio, Tom Woodruff Jr., Ian Whyte	
D E C E M B E R	25	The Bucket List	Warner Bros. Pictures	Rob Reiner (director); Justin Zackham (screenplay); Jack Nicholson, Morgan Freeman, Sean Hayes, Rob Morrow, Beverly Todd, Alfonso Freeman, Rowena King, Jennifer DeFrancisco, Serena Reeder, Annton Berry Jr., Verda Bridges, Destiny Brownridge, Brian Copeland, Ian Anthony Dale, Noel Guglielmi, Jonathan Hernandez, Andrea J. Johnson, Jordan Lund, Jonathan Mangum, Christopher Stapleton, Taylor Ann Thompson, Karen Maruyama, Alex Trebek	
D E C E M B E R	25	The Great Debaters	The Weinstein Company	Denzel Washington (director); Robert Eisele (screenplay); Denzel Washington, Forest Whitaker, Nate Parker, Jurnee Smollett, Denzel Whitaker, Jermaine Williams, Gina Ravera, John Heard, Kimberly Elise, Devyn A. Tyler, Trenton McClain Boyd, Jackson Walker, Tim Parati, Justice Leak, Robert X. Golphin, Damien Leake, Frank L. Ridley	
D E C E M B E R	25	The Water Horse: Legend of the Deep	Columbia Pictures / Revolution Studios / Walden Media / Beacon Pictures	Jay Russell (director); Robert Nelson Jacobs (screenplay); Alexander Nathan Etel, Emily Watson, Ben Chaplin, David Morrissey, Brian Cox, Priyanka Xi, Marshall Napier, Joel Tobeck, Erroll Shand, Craig Hall, Geraldine Brophy	
D E C E M B E R	26	There Will Be Blood	Paramount Vantage / Miramax Films	Paul Thomas Anderson (director/screenplay); Daniel Day-Lewis, Paul Dano, Kevin J. O'Connor, Ciarán Hinds, Dillon Freasier, Paul F. Tompkins, Jim Downey, David Warshofsky, Barry Del Sherman, Russell Harvard, Sydney McCallister, Colleen Foy, David Willis, Hans Howes	

== See also ==
- List of 2007 box office number-one films in the United States
- 2007 in the United States
