= Crazy Love (2007 film) =

2007 American documentary by Dan Klores and Fisher Stevens

- Original poster
- Directed by: Dan Klores; Fisher Stevens
- Written by: Dan Klores
- Produced by: Dan Klores
- Cinematography: Wolfgang Held
- Edited by: David Zieff
- Music by: Douglas J. Cuomo
- Production company: Shoot the Moon Productions
- Distributed by: Magnolia Pictures
- Release date: June 1, 2007
- Running time: 92 minutes
- Country: United States
- Language: English
- Box office: $300,372

Crazy Love is a 2007 American documentary film directed by Dan Klores and Fisher Stevens. The screenplay by Klores explores the troubled relationship between New York City attorney Burt Pugach and his ten-years-younger girlfriend Linda Riss, who was blinded and permanently scarred when career criminals hired by Pugach threw lye in her face.

== Production notes ==
The film premiered at the Sundance Film Festival and was shown at the Seattle International Film Festival before going into limited release in the US. It later was shown at the Reykjavik International Film Festival, the Raindance Film Festival in the UK, and the Amsterdam International Documentary Film Festival.

== Critical reception ==
On the review aggregator website Rotten Tomatoes, 79% of 89 critics' reviews are positive, with an average rating of 7.1/10. The website's consensus reads: "Crazy Love's subjects and story are so compelling that they overcome the doc's dry, talking heads format." Metacritic, which uses a weighted average, assigned the film a score of 69 out of 100, based on 29 critics, indicating "generally favorable" reviews.

Manohla Dargis of The New York Times called the film "somewhat sickening, mildly gonzo" and added, "Crazy Love takes a mildly hyperventilated approach to its subject; there’s a hint of tabloid sensationalism, a splash of kitsch sentimentalism. It moves fast, if predictably so, with the usual mash-up of talking-head testimonials, faded family photographs, blurred home movies and generic stock footage meant to evoke specific times and places. An opening quotation from Jacques Lacan makes you think you’re headed for deep waters, when all that’s in store is a frolic in the shallows. The overall vibe is morbidly entertaining, though something of a downer, partly because it’s unclear if Mr. and Mrs. Pugach know that they are such sick puppies, partly because it’s unclear if Mr. Klores cares that they are ... [It] belongs to that class of documentaries that might be called the family freak show. But it also belongs to the more familiar category of the misery documentary, those nonfiction works that poke into the ghastliness of other people’s lives like a finger rummaging inside a wound ... it also raises more questions than it answers, including the moral responsibility a documentary filmmaker assumes when his subjects seem so eager to exploit themselves."

In Rolling Stone, Peter Travers awarded the film 3 1/2 out of a possible four stars and commented, "For those who don't believe that truth trumps fiction for whacked-out depravity, mark this shockingly fierce and funny spellbinder as Exhibit A."

Carina Chocano of the Los Angeles Times said, "In tone and suspense, Crazy Love feels like a noir thriller, a feeling that's heightened by a great, addling score by Douglas J. Cuomo. For a film about a story as lurid as this, however, Crazy Love is surprisingly sensitive. You don't get the sense that the material is being exploited for its sensational qualities. What emerges instead is a fascinating portrait of two complex and damaged people forced to deal with the consequences of their actions."

In the San Francisco Chronicle, Tamara Straus opined the film was "among the weirdest explorations of connubial relationships since Who's Afraid of Virginia Woolf? And like Edward Albee's 1962 play, it leaves one feeling queasy about human nature ... The film bogs down at points, making one wonder: Why care about these two nutballs? Do we really need another voyeuristic study of the sad and dysfunctional? Fortunately, the film's third act delivers."

== Awards and nominations ==
The film won the Independent Spirit Award for Best Documentary Feature, the Boston Society of Film Critics Award for Best Documentary, and the San Diego Film Critics Society Award for Best Documentary Feature. It was nominated for the Satellite Award for Best Documentary Feature and the Grand Jury Prize at the Sundance Film Festival.

== See also ==
- List of American films of 2007
