= DKC =

DKC may refer to:

- Donkey Kong Country, a video game
  - Donkey Kong Country (series), a video game series
  - Donkey Kong Country (TV series), a television series based on the video games
- Dyskeratosis congenita, a genetic disease
- Dyskerin, a gene also known as DKC1
- DKC (company), a public relations company
