= Burt Pugach =

American lawyer (1927–2020)

Burton N. Pugach (April 20, 1927 – December 24, 2020) was a New York City-based lawyer and felon who spent 14 years in prison for hiring men to throw lye in the face of his former girlfriend Linda Eleanor Riss (February 23, 1937 – January 22, 2013), whom he would later marry.

== Biography ==
In 1959, Pugach began a courtship of Linda Riss, a 21-year-old woman from the East Bronx. Upon discovering that Pugach had a wife and daughter, Riss broke off their relationship. Pugach then threatened to kill or hurt Riss if she left him, saying "If I can't have you, no one else will have you, and when I get through with you no one else will want you." Riss reported the threat to the New York Police Department to no avail. Upon hearing of her engagement to Larry Schwartz, Pugach hired three assailants to attack Riss. The assailants threw lye in Riss's face, leaving her blind in one eye, nearly blind in the other, and permanently scarred. Pugach was convicted of the crime and spent 14 years in prison, during which time he continually wrote to Riss. He was subsequently disbarred, due to his felony conviction.

After he was released from prison in 1974, Pugach and Riss resumed their relationship and married soon thereafter. In 1976 they co-wrote a book, A Very Different Love Story. In 1997 Pugach was once again accused of threatening a woman with whom he was having an affair. Riss appeared at his trial as a character witness for him. Riss died of heart failure on January 22, 2013, at the age of 75. In 2007 Dan Klores produced a documentary film Crazy Love about Pugach and Riss. Pugach died on December 24, 2020, in Queens.

== Bibliography ==
- Farnsworth, Ward and Grady, Mark F. Torts: Cases & Questions. Aspen Publishers. 2004. ISBN 978-0-7355-2704-1
- Stainback, Berry. A Very Different Love Story: Burt and Linda Pugach's Intimate Account of Their Triumph Over Tragedy. Morrow, 1976. ISBN 978-0-688-03089-6
