= Luce Rains =

American actor

- Born: Lexington, Kentucky, U.S.
- Occupation: Actor

Luce Rains is an American actor known for such films and television series as No Country for Old Men, Running with the Devil with Nicolas Cage, 3:10 to Yuma, Appaloosa, Hostiles, Overlook, NM and Walker, Texas Ranger.
