= DKC (company) =

American public relations firm

- Industry: Public relations
- Headquarters: New York, New York
- Website: dkcnews.com

DKC is a public relations firm based in New York, New York. The firm has offices in New York, Washington, D.C., Chicago, Los Angeles, San Francisco, and Century City. Sean Cassidy is the firm's president. Its clients include LinkedIn, Airbnb, Yahoo!, Delta Air Lines, the Children's Health Fund, Citi and the New York Road Runners/New York City Marathon.

DKC was established in 1991 by Dan Klores, who remains the firm's chairman.

== History ==
DKC was founded as Dan Klores Associates in 1991 by Dan Klores. Klores had worked at Howard J. Rubenstein Associates, which was the most influential public relations firm in New York City. Dan Klores Associates was renamed Dan Klores Communications in 2001.

In November 2012, the firm started a new event marketing division. DKC began expanding its branch on the West Coast of the United States in May 2013. In June 2013, Jeffrey Lerner, the former political director of the Democratic National Committee, joined DKC as Executive Vice President. DKC was recognized on the Forbes list of "8 Of The Best Influencer Marketing Campaigns From 8 Hot Agencies." In September 2013, DKC formed a joint venture with JCIR. The firm appointed Joe Quenqua as executive vice president and director of entertainment in November 2013.

DKC opened an office in San Francisco in 2014. Ella Robinson joined DKC as senior vice president of the firm's entertainment group in August 2014. The firm also appointed Molly Currey to its Chicago office as Executive Vice President and head of Consumer Goods Practice.

In 2023, DKC opened a new West Coast office in Century City.
