= Dan Klores =

American film producer

Daniel A. Klores (born December 1949) is American film producer, philanthropist, and the founder and chairman of public relations firm DKC (company).

== Early life ==
Raised in Brooklyn, New York. Klores attended NYC public schools. The oldest of two boys, Dan was the first high school graduate in his family. His father Al, a veteran of Iwo Jima and Okinawa, sold pots and pans door-to-door in the borough. His mother, Esther Molliver, was a homemaker who grew up in the foster care system. Al and Esther were 23 and 18, respectively, when Klores was born Dan's first marriage ended in divorce. On September 30, 1995, Klores married Abbe Goldman, a then-executive vice president of Dan Klores Associates Inc., a public relations and management company in New York.

An honor student through the 7th grade, Klores then encountered many personal struggles. He was rejected from every college to which he applied, eventually receiving a Bachelor’s Degree from the University of South Carolina in August 1973. Later, he attended graduate school for American History, finishing ABD. He taught college-level history in a variety of extension programs, including a maximum security prison, the Central Corrections Institute, and aboard a US Navy nuclear missile destroyer as it toured the Mediterranean for a year. He was a founding Board member of The Children’s Health Fund. and a longtime Member of the Board of the Brooklyn Academy of Music.

== Early career ==
In 1991, Klores founded the public relations firm, DKC. He then went on to direct and write seven documentary films, four of which premiered at the Sundance Film Festival.

His next project was founding a charter high school in the Bronx for hundreds of children of color.

Klores has written three off-Broadway plays, two books, newspaper and magazine columns, essays and articles published in the New York Times, New York Post, Esquire, Southern Exposure, Daily News, The Undefeated, Grantland, Tablet, and The Ringer. He received a Peabody Award and the Independent Spirit Award for best director of the year.

== Basketball and Activism ==
In 2014, Klores created his first non-profit for inner city children, these, ages seven through 17, ‘the RENS,’ named after the 1930’s and 40’s all-Black basketball team. Ninety nine percent of its 17 year-old graduates have received full scholarships and or critical financial aid from universities across the nation including: Princeton, Harvard, Brown, Columbia, Duke, Kentucky, Indiana, Stanford, North Carolina, Wesleyan, Tufts, West Point, and Notre Dame.

In 2009, President Barack Obama hosted some of the organization’s young people to acknowledge the team’s first-of-its-kind nationwide orange emblem program against gun violence. Klores created a tutoring program for RENS youth, pairing grade-school students at their homes with graduate students in education at St Francis College in Brooklyn

== Personal life ==
He has three sons, Jake, Sam and Luke

== Filmography ==
A filmography of Klores's work as director and writer includes:

2003: The Boys of Second Street Park - Showtime

2005: Ring of Fire: the Emile Griffith Story - Universal TV; USA Network

2005: Viva Baseball - Spike TV

2007: Crazy Love - Magnolia Studios

2008: Black Magic – ESPN, (two parts over four hours)

2010: Winning Time: Reggie Miller vs the New York Knicks - ESPN

2018: Basketball: a Love Story – ESPN (a 10-part series spanning 20 hours)

== Theater work ==
His off-Broadway work as a writer include:

2003: Myrtle Beach at the Duke Theatre starring Yul Vazquez and David Deblinger

2006: Little Doc at the Rattlestick Playhouse, starring Adam Driver

2009: The Wood at Rattlestick, directed by David Bar Katz, about the life of the Pulitzer Prize winning newspaper columnist, Mike MacAlary
