= List of films at the 2007 Sundance Film Festival =

The following films were shown at the 2007 Sundance Film Festival.

== Premieres ==
Title	Category	Director	Country	Minutes	Year	URL
An American Crime	Premieres	Tommy O'Haver	U.S.	92	2006	sundance imdb
An American Crime	Written by Tommy O'Haver, Irene Turner					
An American Crime	Starring Catherine Keener, Elliot Page, James Franco, Bradley Whitford					
Away From Her	Premieres	Sarah Polley	Canada	110	2006	sundance imdb
Away From Her	Written by Sarah Polley, adapted from the short story "The Bear Came Over the Mountain" by Alice Munro					
Away From Her	Starring Julie Christie, Gordon Pinsent, Olympia Dukakis, Kristen Thomson, Michael Murphy, Wendy Crewson					
Black Snake Moan	Premieres	Craig Brewer	U.S.	118	2006	sundance imdb
Black Snake Moan	Written by Craig Brewer					
Black Snake Moan	Starring Samuel L. Jackson, Christina Ricci, Justin Timberlake, S. Epatha Merkerson, John Cothran					
El Camino de los ingleses (Summer Rain)	Premieres	Antonio Banderas	Spain	118	2006	sundance imdb
El Camino de los ingleses (Summer Rain)	Written by Antonio Soler					
El Camino de los ingleses (Summer Rain)	Starring Alberto Amarilla, María Ruiz, Raúl Arévalo, Victoria Abril, Félix Gómez, Juan Diego, Fran Perea					
Chapter 27	Premieres	Jarrett Schaefer	U.S.	100	2006	sundance imdb
Chapter 27	Written by Jarrett Schaefer					
Chapter 27	Starring Jared Leto, Judah Friedlander, Lindsay Lohan, Mark Lindsay Chapman					
Chicago 10	Premieres	Brett Morgen	U.S.	103	2006	sundance imdb
Chicago 10	Written by Brett Morgen					
Chicago 10	Starring Hank Azaria, Dylan Baker, Nick Nolte, Mark Ruffalo, Roy Scheider, Liev Schreiber, Leonard Weinglass, Jeffrey Wright					
Clubland	Premieres	Cherie Nowlan	Australia	108	2006	sundance imdb
Clubland	Written by Keith Thompson					
Clubland	Starring Brenda Blethyn, Khan Chittenden, Emma Booth, Richard Wilson, Frankie J. Holden, Rebecca Gibney, Philip Quast, Katie Wall, Russell Dykstra					
The Good Night	Premieres	Jake Paltrow	U.S.	90	2006	sundance imdb
The Good Night	Written by Jake Paltrow					
The Good Night	Starring Penélope Cruz, Danny DeVito, Martin Freeman, Gwyneth Paltrow, Simon Pegg, Keith Allen, Amber Sealey					
King of California	Premieres	Mike Cahill	U.S.	93	2006	sundance imdb
King of California	Written by Mike Cahill					
King of California	Starring Michael Douglas, Evan Rachel Wood, Willis Burks II, Laura Kachergus					
Life Support	Premieres	Nelson George	U.S.	127	2006	sundance imdb
Life Support	Written by Nelson George, Jim McKay, Hannah Weyer					
Life Support	Starring Queen Latifah, Anna Deavere Smith, Wendell Pierce, Rachel Nicks, Evan Ross, Tracee Ellis Ross					
Longford	Premieres	Tom Hooper	United Kingdom	88	2006	sundance imdb
Longford	Written by Peter Morgan					
Longford	Starring Jim Broadbent, Samantha Morton, Lindsay Duncan, Andy Serkis					
The Nines	Premieres	John August	U.S.	102	2006	sundance imdb
The Nines	Written by John August					
The Nines	Starring Ryan Reynolds, Hope Davis, Melissa McCarthy, Elle Fanning, David Denman, Octavia Spencer, Dahlia Salem					
Resurrecting the Champ	Premieres	Rod Lurie	U.S.	113	2006	sundance imdb
Resurrecting the Champ	Written by Allison Burnett and Michael Bortman, based on the LA Times Magazine article by J.R. Moehringer					
Resurrecting the Champ	Starring Samuel L. Jackson, Josh Hartnett, Teri Hatcher, Kathryn Morris, Rachel Nichols, Alan Alda					
The Savages	Premieres	Tamara Jenkins	U.S.	113	2006	sundance imdb
The Savages	Written by Tamara Jenkins					
The Savages	Starring Laura Linney, Philip Seymour Hoffman, Philip Bosco					
Son of Rambow	Premieres	Garth Jennings	United Kingdom	95	2006	sundance imdb
Son of Rambow	Written by Garth Jennings					
Son of Rambow	Starring Will Poulter, Bill Milner, Jules Sitruk, Charlie Thrift, Jessica Stevenson, Neil Dudgeon					
Trade	Premieres	Marco Kreuzpaintner	U.S.	113	2006	sundance imdb
Trade	Written by José Rivera, based on the New York Times Magazine article “The Girls Next Door” by Peter Landesman					
Trade	Starring Kevin Kline, Cesar Ramos, Alicja Bachleda, Paulina Gaitan, Marco Pérez, Pasha D. Lynchnikoff, Tim Reid, Linda Emond					
Year of the Dog	Premieres	Mike White	U.S.	98	2006	sundance imdb
Year of the Dog	Written by Mike White					
Year of the Dog	Starring Molly Shannon, Laura Dern, Regina King, Tom McCarthy, Josh Pais, John C. Reilly, Peter Sarsgaard					

== Independent Film Competition: Documentary ==
The 16 films below were chosen from 856 submissions by U.S. filmmakers and each film is a world premiere.

Title	Category	Director	Country	Minutes	Year	URL
Banished	Documentary Competition	Marco Williams	U.S.	86	2006	sundance
Banished	Written by unknown					
Banished	Starring unknown					
Chasing Ghosts	Documentary Competition	Lincoln Ruchti	U.S.	90	2006	sundance
Chasing Ghosts	Written by unknown					
Chasing Ghosts	Starring unknown					
Crazy Love	Documentary Competition	Dan Klores	U.S.	91	2006	sundance imdb
Crazy Love	Written by unknown					
Crazy Love	Starring unknown					
Everything's Cool	Documentary Competition	Daniel B. Gold, Judith Helfand	U.S.	100	2006	sundance imdb
Everything's Cool	Written by unknown					
Everything's Cool	Starring unknown					
For the Bible Tells Me So	Documentary Competition	Daniel Karslake	U.S.	95	2006	sundance imdb
For the Bible Tells Me So	Written by Daniel Karslake, Nancy Kennedy					
For the Bible Tells Me So	Starring unknown					
Ghosts of Abu Ghraib	Documentary Competition	Rory Kennedy	U.S.	82	2006	sundance imdb
Ghosts of Abu Ghraib	Written by Jack Youngelson					
Ghosts of Abu Ghraib	Starring unknown					
Girl 27	Documentary Competition	David Stenn	U.S.	86	2006	sundance imdb
Girl 27	Written by unknown					
Girl 27	Starring unknown					
Hear and Now	Documentary Competition	Irene Taylor Brodsky	U.S.	86	2006	sundance imdb
Hear and Now	Written by Irene Taylor Brodsky					
Hear and Now	Starring unknown					
Manda Bala (Send a Bullet)	Documentary Competition	Jason Kohn	U.S.	85	2006	sundance imdb
Manda Bala (Send a Bullet)	Written by unknown					
Manda Bala (Send a Bullet)	Starring unknown					
My Kid Could Paint That	Documentary Competition	Amir Bar-Lev	U.S.	81	2006	sundance imdb
My Kid Could Paint That	Written by unknown					
My Kid Could Paint That	Starring unknown					
Nanking	Documentary Competition	Bill Guttentag, Dan Sturman	U.S.	91	2006	sundance imdb
Nanking	Written by Bill Guttentag, Dan Sturman					
Nanking	Starring Woody Harrelson, Mariel Hemingway, Jürgen Prochnow, Stephen Dorff, John Getz, Rosalind Chao					
No End in Sight	Documentary Competition	Charles H. Ferguson	U.S.	102	2006	sundance imdb
No End in Sight	Written by Charles H. Ferguson					
No End in Sight	Starring unknown					
Protagonist	Documentary Competition	Jessica Yu	U.S.	90	2006	sundance imdb
Protagonist	Written by Jessica Yu					
Protagonist	Starring unknown					
War/Dance	Documentary Competition	Andrea Nix Fine, Sean Fine	U.S.	105	2006	sundance imdb
War/Dance	Written by Andrea Nix Fine, Sean Fine					
White Light/Black Rain: The Destruction of Hiroshima and Nagasaki	Documentary Competition	Steven Okazaki	U.S.	86	2006	sundance imdb
White Light/Black Rain: The Destruction of Hiroshima and Nagasaki	Written by unknown					
White Light/Black Rain: The Destruction of Hiroshima and Nagasaki	Starring unknown					
Zoo	Documentary Competition	Robinson Devor	U.S.	80	2006	sundance imdb
Zoo	Written by Charles Mudede, Robinson Devor					
Zoo	Starring unknown					

== Independent Film Competition: Dramatic ==
The 16 films below were chosen from 996 submissions and each film is a world premiere.

Title	Category	Director	Country	Minutes	Year	URL
Adrift in Manhattan	Dramatic Competition	Alfredo de Villa	U.S.	89	2006	sundance imdb
Adrift in Manhattan	Written by Nat Moss, Alfredo de Villa					
Adrift in Manhattan	Starring Heather Graham, Victor Rasuk, Dominic Chianese, William Baldwin, Elizabeth Peña, Marlene Forte, Richard Petrocelli, Erika Michels					
Broken English	Dramatic Competition	Zoe Cassavetes	U.S.	96	2006	sundance imdb
Broken English	Written by Zoe Cassavetes					
Broken English	Starring Parker Posey, Drea de Matteo, Melvil Poupaud, Gena Rowlands, Peter Bogdanovich, Justin Theroux					
Four Sheets to the Wind	Dramatic Competition	Sterlin Harjo	U.S.	91	2006	sundance imdb
Four Sheets to the Wind	Written by Sterlin Harjo					
Four Sheets to the Wind	Starring Cody Lightning, Jeri Arredondo, Tamara Podemski, Laura Bailey, Richard Ray Whitman, Christian Kane, Mike Randleman					
The Good Life	Dramatic Competition	Steve Berra	U.S.	106	2006	sundance imdb
The Good Life	Written by Steve Berra					
The Good Life	Starring Mark Webber, Zooey Deschanel, Bill Paxton, Harry Dean Stanton, Chris Klein, Patrick Fugit, Drea de Matteo, Bruce McGill, Donal Logue, Deborah Rush					
Grace Is Gone	Dramatic Competition	James C. Strouse	U.S.	90	2006	sundance imdb
Grace Is Gone	Written by James C. Strouse					
Grace Is Gone	Starring John Cusack, Alessandro Nivola, Shélan O'Keefe, Gracie Bdenarczyk					
Hounddog	Dramatic Competition	Deborah Kampmeier	U.S.	98	2006	sundance imdb
Hounddog	Written by Deborah Kampmeier					
Hounddog	Starring Dakota Fanning, Robin Wright Penn, David Morse, Piper Laurie, Afemo Omilami, Jill Scott					
Joshua	Dramatic Competition	George Ratliff	U.S.	105	2006	sundance imdb
Joshua	Written by David Gilbert, George Ratliff					
Joshua	Starring Sam Rockwell, Vera Farmiga, Celia Weston, Dallas Roberts, Michael McKean, Jacob Kogan					
Never Forever	Dramatic Competition	Gina Kim	U.S.	105	2006	sundance imdb
Never Forever	Written by Gina Kim					
Never Forever	Starring Vera Farmiga, Ha Jung-woo, David McInnis					
On the Road with Judas	Dramatic Competition	J. J. Lask	U.S.	100	2006	sundance imdb
On the Road with Judas	Written by JJ Lask					
On the Road with Judas	Starring Aaron Ruell, Kevin Corrigan, Eddie Kaye Thomas, Eleanor Hutchins, Amanda Loncar, Alex Burns, Leo Fitzpatrick					
Padre Nuestro	Dramatic Competition	Christopher Zalla	U.S.	105	2006	sundance imdb
Padre Nuestro	Written by Christopher Zalla					
Padre Nuestro	Starring Jesús Ochoa, Armando Hernández, Jorge Adrián Espíndola, Paola Mendoza					
The Pool	Dramatic Competition	Chris Smith	U.S.	104	2006	sundance imdb
The Pool	Written by Chris Smith, Randy Russell					
The Pool	Starring Nana Patekar, Venkatesh Chavan, Jhangir Badshah, Ayesha Mohan, Malcom Faria					
Rocket Science	Dramatic Competition	Jeffrey Blitz	U.S.	98	2006	sundance imdb
Rocket Science	Written by Jeffrey Blitz					
Rocket Science	Starring Reece Daniel Thompson, Anna Kendrick, Nicholas D'Agosto, Vincent Piazza					
Snow Angels	Dramatic Competition	David Gordon Green	U.S.	106	2006	sundance imdb
Snow Angels	Written by David Gordon Green					
Snow Angels	Starring Sam Rockwell, Kate Beckinsale, Michael Angarano, Griffin Dunne, Amy Sedaris, Olivia Thirlby					
Starting Out in the Evening	Dramatic Competition	Andrew Wagner	U.S.	105	2006	sundance imdb
Starting Out in the Evening	Written by Andrew Wagner, Fred Parnes, based on the novel by Brian Morton					
Starting Out in the Evening	Starring Frank Langella, Lili Taylor, Lauren Ambrose, Adrian Lester					
Teeth	Dramatic Competition	Mitchell Lichtenstein	U.S.	87	2006	sundance imdb
Teeth	Written by Mitchell Lichtenstein					
Teeth	Starring Jess Weixler, John Hensley, Josh Pais, Hale Appleman, Lenny Von Dohlen, Vivienne Benesch, Ashley Springer, Julia Garro, Adam Wagner					
Weapons (film)	Dramatic Competition	Adam Bhala Lough	U.S.	85	2006	sundance imdb
Weapons (film)	Written by Adam Bhala Lough					
Weapons (film)	Starring Nick Cannon, Paul Dano, Mark Webber, Riley Smith, Regine Nehy, Jade Yorker, Amy Ferguson, Arliss Howard					

== World Cinema Competition: Documentary ==
The 16 films below were chosen from 506 submissions.

Title	Category	Director	Country	Minutes	Year	URL
Acidente	World Documentary Competition	Cao Guimarães, Pablo Lobato	Brazil	72	2006	sundance imdb
Acidente	Written by Cao Guimarães, Pablo Lobato					
Acidente	Starring unknown					
Bajo Juárez: La ciudad devorando a sus hijas (Bajo Juárez: The City Devouring Its Daughters)	World Documentary Competition	José Antonio Cordero, Alejandra Sánchez	Mexico	90	2006	sundance imdb
Bajo Juárez: La ciudad devorando a sus hijas (Bajo Juárez: The City Devouring Its Daughters)	Written by unknown					
Bajo Juárez: La ciudad devorando a sus hijas (Bajo Juárez: The City Devouring Its Daughters)	Starring unknown					
Cocalero	World Documentary Competition	Alejandro Landes	Bolivia/Argentina	86	2006	sundance imdb
Cocalero	Written by Alejandro Landes					
Cocalero	Starring unknown					
Comrades in Dreams	World Documentary Competition	Uli Gaulke	Germany	102	2006	sundance imdb
Comrades in Dreams	Written by Uli Gaulke, Jeannette Eggert					
Comrades in Dreams	Starring unknown					
Crossing the Line	World Documentary Competition	Daniel Gordon	United Kingdom	90	2006	sundance imdb
Crossing the Line	Written by Daniel Gordon					
Crossing the Line	Starring unknown					
Drei Kameraden (Three Comrades)	World Documentary Competition	Masha Novikova	Netherlands	99	2006	sundance imdb
Drei Kameraden (Three Comrades)	Written by Masha Novikova					
Drei Kameraden (Three Comrades)	Starring unknown					
Hot House	World Documentary Competition	Shimon Dotan	Israel	90	2006	sundance imdb
Hot House	Written by Shimon Dotan					
Hot House	Starring unknown					
In the Shadow of the Moon	World Documentary Competition	David Sington	United Kingdom	100	2006	sundance imdb
In the Shadow of the Moon	Written by unknown					
In the Shadow of the Moon	Starring unknown					
Joe Strummer: The Future Is Unwritten	World Documentary Competition	Julien Temple	Ireland/United Kingdom	123	2006	sundance imdb
Joe Strummer: The Future Is Unwritten	Written by unknown					
Joe Strummer: The Future Is Unwritten	Starring unknown					
Manufactured Landscapes	World Documentary Competition	Jennifer Baichwal	Canada	90	2006	sundance imdb
Manufactured Landscapes	Written by unknown					
Manufactured Landscapes	Starring unknown					
The Monastery: Mr. Vig and the Nun	World Documentary Competition	Pernille Rose Grønkjær	Denmark	84	2006	sundance imdb
The Monastery: Mr. Vig and the Nun	Written by unknown					
The Monastery: Mr. Vig and the Nun	Starring unknown					
On a Tightrope	World Documentary Competition	Petr Lom	Norway/Canada	74	2006	sundance imdb
On a Tightrope	Written by unknown					
On a Tightrope	Starring unknown					
A Very British Gangster	World Documentary Competition	Donal Mac Intyre	United Kingdom	97	2006	sundance imdb
A Very British Gangster	Written by unknown					
A Very British Gangster	Starring unknown					
VHS—Kahloucha	World Documentary Competition	Nejib Belkadhi	Tunisia	80	2006	sundance imdb
VHS—Kahloucha	Written by unknown					
VHS—Kahloucha	Starring unknown					
Vores lykkes fjender (Enemies of Happiness)	World Documentary Competition	Anja Al Erhayem, Eva Mulvad	Denmark	58	2006	sundance imdb
Vores lykkes fjender (Enemies of Happiness)	Written by unknown					
Vores lykkes fjender (Enemies of Happiness)	Starring unknown					
Welcome Europa	World Documentary Competition	Bruno Ulmer	France	90	2006	sundance imdb
Welcome Europa	Written by Bruno Ulmer					
Welcome Europa	Starring unknown					

== World Cinema Competition: Dramatic ==
The 16 films below were chosen from 929 submissions.

Title	Category	Director	Country	Minutes	Year	URL
Adama Meshuga'at (Sweet Mud)	World Dramatic Competition	Dror Shaul	Israel	97	2006	sundance imdb
Adama Meshuga'at (Sweet Mud)	Written by Dror Shaul					
Adama Meshuga'at (Sweet Mud)	Starring Tomer Steinhof, Ronit Yudkevitch, Henri Garcin, Shai Avivi, Gal Zaid, Sharon Zuckerman					
Ane-eui Aein-eul Mannada (Driving with My Wife's Lover)	World Dramatic Competition	Kim Tai-sik	South Korea	92	2006	sundance
Ane-eui Aein-eul Mannada (Driving with My Wife's Lover)	Written by Kim Jun-han, Kim Tai-sik					
Ane-eui Aein-eul Mannada (Driving with My Wife's Lover)	Starring Park Kwang-jung, Jung Bo-suk, Cho Eun-ji					
El Búfalo de la Noche (The Night Buffalo)	World Dramatic Competition	Jorge Hernandez Aldana	Mexico	97	2006	sundance imdb
El Búfalo de la Noche (The Night Buffalo)	Written by Jorge Hernandez Aldana, Guillermo Arriaga, based on Arriaga's novel the Night Buffalo					
El Búfalo de la Noche (The Night Buffalo)	Starring Diego Luna, Liz Gallardo, Gabriel Gonzalez, Irene Azuela, Emilio Echevarría, Camila Sodi					
Eagle vs Shark	World Dramatic Competition	Taika Waititi	New Zealand	87	2006	sundance imdb
Eagle vs Shark	Written by Taika Waititi					
Eagle vs Shark	Starring Loren Horsley, Jemaine Clement, Craig Hall, Rachel House, Brian Sergent, Joel Tobeck					
Ezra	World Dramatic Competition	Newton I. Aduaka	France/Nigeria/Austria	110	2006	sundance imdb
Ezra	Written by Newton I. Aduaka, Alain-Michel Blanc					
Ezra	Starring Mamoudou Turay Kamara, Richard Gant, Mariame N'Diaye, Emile Abossolo M'Bo					
La Faute à Fidel (Blame it on Fidel)	World Dramatic Competition	Julie Gavras	France	110	2006	sundance imdb
La Faute à Fidel (Blame it on Fidel)	Written by Julie Gavras					
La Faute à Fidel (Blame it on Fidel)	Starring Julie Depardieu, Stefano Accorsi, Nina Kervel, Benjamin Feuillet, Martine Chevallier					
Ghosts	World Dramatic Competition	Nick Broomfield	United Kingdom	96	2006	sundance imdb
Ghosts	Written by Nick Broomfield, Jez Lewis					
Ghosts	Starring Ai Qin Lin, Zhan Yu, Zhe Wei, Man Qin Wei, Yong Aing Zhai, Devi Zhu					
L' Héritage (The Legacy)	World Dramatic Competition	Géla Babluani, Temur Babluani	France	76	2005	sundance imdb
L' Héritage (The Legacy)	Written by Géla Babluani, Temur Babluani					
L' Héritage (The Legacy)	Starring Sylvie Testud, Stanislas Merhar, Olga Legrand, Pascal Bongard, George Babluani, Leo Gaparidze					
How She Move	World Dramatic Competition	Ian Iqbal Rashid	Canada	98	2006	sundance imdb
How She Move	Written by Annmarie Morais					
How She Move	Starring Rutina Wesley, Dwain Murphy, Tré Armstrong, Brennan Gademans, Clé Bennett, Melanie Nicholls-Kin					
Jin tian de yu zen me yang? (How Is Your Fish Today?)	World Dramatic Competition	Xiaolu Guo	United Kingdom	83	2006	sundance imdb
Jin tian de yu zen me yang? (How Is Your Fish Today?)	Written by Rao Hui, Xiaolu Guo					
Jin tian de yu zen me yang? (How Is Your Fish Today?)	Starring Rao Hui, Lin Hao, Yang Zi Jiang, Hao Ning, Wu Ning, Xiaolu Guo (Mimi)					
Khadak (The Colour of Water)	World Dramatic Competition	Peter Brosens, Jessica Woodworth	Germany/Belgium	104	2006	sundance imdb
Khadak (The Colour of Water)	Written by Peter Brosens, Jessica Woodworth					
Khadak (The Colour of Water)	Starring Batzul Khayankhyarvaa, Dugarsuren Dagvadorj, Tsetsegee Byamba, Damchaa Banzar, Tserendarizav Dashnyam, Uuriintuya Enkhtaivan					
Noise	World Dramatic Competition	Matthew Saville	Australia	109	2006	sundance imdb
Noise	Written by Matthew Saville					
Noise	Starring Brendan Cowell, Maia Thomas, Henry Nixon, Nicholas Bell					
O Cheiro do Ralo (Drained)	World Dramatic Competition	Heitor Dhalia	Brazil	105	2006	sundance imdb
O Cheiro do Ralo (Drained)	Written by Marçal Aquino, Heitor Dhalia					
O Cheiro do Ralo (Drained)	Starring Selton Mello, Paula Braun, Lourenço Mutarelli, Silvia Lourenço, Fabiana Gugli, Martha Meola					
Once	World Dramatic Competition	John Carney	Ireland	88	2006	sundance imdb
Once	Written by John Carney					
Once	Starring Glen Hansard, Marketa Irglova					
Ostrov (The Island)	World Dramatic Competition	Pavel Lungin	Russian Federation	112	2006	sundance imdb
Ostrov (The Island)	Written by Dmitry Sobolev					
Ostrov (The Island)	Starring Pyotr Mamonov, Viktor Sukhorukov, Dmitri Dyuzhev, Yuri Kuznetsov					
Rêves de poussière (Buried Dreams)	World Dramatic Competition	Laurent Salgues	Burkina Faso/Canada/France	86	2006	sundance imdb
Rêves de poussière (Buried Dreams)	Written by Laurent Salgues					
Rêves de poussière (Buried Dreams)	Starring Makena Diop, Rasmané Ouedraogo, Fatou Tall-Salgues, Joseph B. Tapsoba, Souleymane Zouré					

== Frontier ==
Title	Category	Director	Country	Minutes	Year	URL
1st Light	Frontier	Paul Chan	U.S.	14	2006	sundance
1st Light	Written by unknown					
1st Light	Starring unknown					
Academy	Frontier	R. Luke DuBois	U.S.	75	2006	sundance
Academy	Written by unknown					
Academy	Starring unknown					
Cluster	Frontier	Lincoln Schatz	U.S.	---	2006	sundance
Cluster	Written by unknown					
Cluster	Starring unknown					
Copenhagen Cycles	Frontier	Eric Dyer	U.S.	---	2006	sundance
Copenhagen Cycles	Written by unknown					
Copenhagen Cycles	Starring unknown					
Klip//Effect	Frontier	Klip Collective	U.S.	---	2007	sundance
Klip//Effect	Written by unknown					
Klip//Effect	Starring unknown					
The Last Dining Table	Frontier	Roh Gyeong-tae	South Korea	91	2006	sundance imdb
The Last Dining Table	Written by Roh Gyeong-tae					
The Last Dining Table	Starring Hyun-Joo Baek, Do-Yeon Kim, Heung-Ki Oh, Suk-Yeon Hong, Bok-Soon Hwang					
Lynn Hershman Leeson In Second Life	Frontier	Lynn Hershman Leeson	U.S.	---	2007	sundance
Lynn Hershman Leeson In Second Life	Written by unknown					
Lynn Hershman Leeson In Second Life	Starring unknown					
Meet Me In Wichita	Frontier	Martha Colburn	U.S.	---	2006	sundance
Meet Me In Wichita	Written by unknown					
Meet Me In Wichita	Starring unknown					
Mobiopera	Frontier	Shu Lea Cheang	U.S.	---	2007	sundance
Mobiopera	Written by unknown					
Mobiopera	Starring unknown					
Offscreen	Frontier	Christoffer Boe	Denmark	93	2006	sundance imdb
Offscreen	Written by Christoffer Boe, Knud Romer Jørgensen					
Offscreen	Starring Nicolas Bro, Lene Maria Christensen, Trine Dyrholm, Jakob Cedergren, Christoffer Boe					
Phantom Love	Frontier	Nina Menkes	U.S.	85	2006	sundance imdb
Phantom Love	Written by Nina Menkes					
Phantom Love	Starring Marina Shoif, Juliette Marquis					
Pierre Huyghe Artist Spotlight	Frontier	Pierre Huyghe	France	90	2007	sundance
Pierre Huyghe Artist Spotlight	Written by unknown					
Pierre Huyghe Artist Spotlight	Starring unknown					
Play	Frontier	R. Luke DuBois	U.S.	1	2005	sundance
Play	Written by unknown					
Play	Starring unknown					
Slipstream	Frontier	Anthony Hopkins	U.S.	110	2006	sundance imdb
Slipstream	Written by Anthony Hopkins					
Slipstream	Starring Anthony Hopkins, John Turturro, Christian Slater, Stella Arroyave, Camryn Manheim, Lisa Pepper, Gavin Grazer					
Soapbox Agitation #1: Proving Ground	Frontier	Travis Wilkerson	U.S.	---	2007	sundance
Soapbox Agitation #1: Proving Ground	Written by unknown					
Soapbox Agitation #1: Proving Ground	Starring unknown					
Strange Culture	Frontier	Lynn Hershman Leeson	U.S.	75	2006	sundance
Strange Culture	Written by Lynn Hershman Leeson					
Strange Culture	Starring Tilda Swinton, Thomas Jay Ryan, Peter Coyote, Josh Kornbluth, Steve Kurtz					
You Are Here	Frontier	James Graham	U.S.	---	2006	sundance
You Are Here	Written by unknown					
You Are Here	Starring Amber Heard					
Zidane: A 21st Century Portrait	Frontier	Douglas Gordon, Philippe Parreno	France	90	2006	sundance imdb
Zidane: A 21st Century Portrait	Written by unknown					
Zidane: A 21st Century Portrait	Starring unknown					

== Midnight ==
Title	Category	Director	Country	Minutes	Year	URL
Fido	Midnight	Andrew Currie	Canada	98	2006	sundance imdb
Fido	Written by Dennis Heaton, Robert Chomiak, Andrew Currie					
Fido	Starring Carrie-Anne Moss, Billy Connolly, Dylan Baker, Tim Blake Nelson, Henry Czerny					
Finishing the Game	Midnight	Justin Lin	U.S.	88	2006	sundance imdb
Finishing the Game	Written by Josh Diamond, Justin Lin					
Finishing the Game	Starring McCaleb Burnett, Monique Gabriela Curnen, Roger Fan, Sung Kang, Mousa Kraish, Meredith Scott Lynn, Dustin Nguyen					
It Is Fine! Everything Is Fine.	Midnight	David Brothers, Crispin Glover	U.S.	74	2006	sundance imdb
It Is Fine! Everything Is Fine.	Written by Steven C. Stewart					
It Is Fine! Everything Is Fine.	Starring Margit Carstensen, Steven C. Stewart, Carrie Szlasa, Lauren German, Bruce Glover					
The Signal	Midnight	David Bruckner, Dan Bush, Jacob Gentry	U.S.	99	2006	sundance imdb
The Signal	Written by David Bruckner, Jacob Gentry, Dan Bush					
The Signal	Starring A.J. Bowen, Anessa Ramsey, Cheri Christian, Justin Welborn, Scott Poythress, Sahr Ngaujah					
Sk8 Life	Midnight	S. Wyeth Clarkson	Canada	85	2006	sundance imdb
Sk8 Life	Written by S. Wyeth Clarkson, Elan Mastai					
Sk8 Life	Starring Kris Foley, Dustin Montie, Chad Dickson, Mark Bajcar, Silas Borsos, Alison Matasi, Kathy Miller, Jarvis Nigelsky					
Smiley Face	Midnight	Gregg Araki	U.S.	88	2006	sundance imdb
Smiley Face	Written by Dylan Haggerty					
Smiley Face	Starring Anna Faris, John Krasinski, Adam Brody, Danny Masterson, Jane Lynch, Michael Hitchcock, John Cho					
The Ten	Midnight	David Wain	U.S.	93	2006	sundance imdb
The Ten	Written by Ken Marino, David Wain					
The Ten	Starring Paul Rudd, Adam Brody, Rob Corddry, Jessica Alba, Winona Ryder, Liev Schreiber, Justin Theroux, Gretchen Mol, Oliver Platt, Famke Janssen, Ken Marino					
We Are the Strange	Midnight	M dot Strange	U.S.	88	2006	sundance imdb
We Are the Strange	Written by M dot Strange					
We Are the Strange	Starring David Choe, Stuart Mahoney, Halleh Seddighzadeh, M dot Strange, Chaylon Blancett					

== Spectrum ==
Title	Category	Director	Country	Minutes	Year	URL
Angel-A	Spectrum	Luc Besson	France	91	2005	sundance imdb
Angel-A	Written by Luc Besson					
Angel-A	Starring Jamel Debbouze, Rie Rasmussen, Gilbert Melki, Serge Riaboukine					
Autism Every Day	Spectrum	Lauren Thierry	U.S.	44	2006	sundance imdb
Autism Every Day	Written by unknown					
Autism Every Day	Starring unknown					
Dark Matter	Spectrum	Chen Shi-Zheng	U.S.	90	2007	sundance imdb
Dark Matter	Written by Billy Shebar					
Dark Matter	Starring Liu Ye, Aidan Quinn, Meryl Streep, Blair Brown, Bill Irwin					
Dedication	Spectrum	Justin Theroux	U.S.	111	2006	sundance imdb
Dedication	Written by David Bromberg					
Dedication	Starring Billy Crudup, Mandy Moore, Tom Wilkinson, Dianne Wiest, Bob Balaban, Martin Freeman					
Delirious	Spectrum	Tom DiCillo	U.S.	100	2006	sundance imdb
Delirious	Written by Tom DiCillo					
Delirious	Starring Steve Buscemi, Michael Pitt, Alison Lohman, Gina Gershon					
The Devil Came on Horseback	Spectrum	Ricki Stern, Annie Sundberg	U.S.	85	2006	sundance imdb
The Devil Came on Horseback	Written by Annie Sundberg, Ricki Stern					
The Devil Came on Horseback	Starring unknown					
Expired	Spectrum	Cecilia Miniucchi	U.S.	110	2007	sundance imdb
Expired	Written by Cecilia Miniucchi					
Expired	Starring Samantha Morton, Jason Patric, Teri Garr, Illeana Douglas					
Fay Grim	Spectrum	Hal Hartley	U.S.	118	2006	sundance imdb
Fay Grim	Written by Hal Hartley					
Fay Grim	Starring Parker Posey, Jeff Goldblum, James Urbaniak, Saffron Burrows, Liam Aiken, Thomas Jay Ryan					
Flying: Confessions of a Free Woman	Spectrum	Jennifer Fox	Denmark	353	2007	sundance imdb
Flying: Confessions of a Free Woman	Written by unknown					
Flying: Confessions of a Free Woman	Starring unknown					
Das Fräulein (Fraulein)	Spectrum	Andrea Staka	Switzerland/Germany	81	2006	sundance imdb
Das Fräulein (Fraulein)	Written by Andrea Staka					
Das Fräulein (Fraulein)	Starring Mirjana Karanovic, Marija Skaricic, Ljubica Jovic, Andrea Zogg, Pablo Aguilar, Zdenko Jelcic					
The Go-Getter	Spectrum	Martin Hynes	U.S.	93	2006	sundance imdb
The Go-Getter	Written by Martin Hynes					
The Go-Getter	Starring Lou Taylor Pucci, Zooey Deschanel, Jena Malone, Judy Greer, Maura Tierney					
Great World of Sound	Spectrum	Craig Zobel	U.S.	106	2006	sundance imdb
Great World of Sound	Written by George Smith, Craig Zobel					
Great World of Sound	Starring Pat Healy, Kene Holliday, Rebecca Mader, Tricia Paoluccio, Robert Longstreet, John Baker					
If I Had Known I Was a Genius	Spectrum	Dominique Wirtschafter	U.S.	102	2006	sundance imdb
If I Had Known I Was a Genius	Written by Markus Redmond					
If I Had Known I Was a Genius	Starring Markus Redmond, Whoopi Goldberg, Keith David, Debra Wilson, Sharon Stone, Tara Reid					
Interview	Spectrum	Steve Buscemi	U.S.	86	2006	sundance imdb
Interview	Written by David Schechter, Steve Buscemi					
Interview	Starring Steve Buscemi, Sienna Miller					
The Last Mimzy	Spectrum	Robert Shaye	U.S.	90	2007	sundance imdb
The Last Mimzy	Written by Bruce Joel Rubin, Toby Emmerich					
The Last Mimzy	Starring Joely Richardson, Timothy Hutton, Michael Clarke Duncan, Rainn Wilson, Kathryn Hahn, Chris O'Neil, Rhiannon Leigh Wryn					
Low and Behold	Spectrum	Zack Godshall	U.S.	89	2006	sundance imdb
Low and Behold	Written by Zack Godshall, Barlow Jacobs					
Low and Behold	Starring Barlow Jacobs, Robert Longstreet, Eddie Rouse					
La Misma Luna (The Same Moon)	Spectrum	Patricia Riggen	U.S.	109	2007	sundance imdb
La Misma Luna (The Same Moon)	Written by Ligiah Villalobos					
La Misma Luna (The Same Moon)	Starring Adrian Alonso, Kate del Castillo, Eugenio Derbez, Maya Zapata, Carmen Salinas, America Ferrera					
Miss Navajo	Spectrum	Billy Luther	U.S.	60	2006	sundance imdb
Miss Navajo	Written by unknown					
Miss Navajo	Starring unknown					
Mushishi (Bugmaster)	Spectrum	Katsuhiro Otomo	Japan	106	2006	sundance imdb
Mushishi (Bugmaster)	Written by Sadayuki Murai					
Mushishi (Bugmaster)	Starring Makiko Esumi, Yu Aoi, Nao Omori, Joe Odagiri					
Red Road	Spectrum	Andrea Arnold	United Kingdom	113	2006	sundance imdb
Red Road	Written by Andrea Arnold					
Red Road	Starring Katie Dickie, Tony Curran, Martin Compston, Natalie Press					
Reprise	Spectrum	Joachim Trier	Norway	105	2005	sundance imdb
Reprise	Written by Eskil Vogt, Joachim Trier					
Reprise	Starring Espen Klouman-Høiner, Anders Danielsen Lie, Viktoria Winge, Christian Rubeck, Pål Stokka, Odd-Magnus Williamson					
Save Me	Spectrum	Robert Cary	U.S.	93	2006	sundance imdb
Save Me	Written by Craig Chester, Alan Hines, Robert Desiderio					
Save Me	Starring Chad Allen, Robert Gant, Judith Light, Stephen Lang					
Tuli	Spectrum	Auraeus Solito	Philippines	107	2006	sundance imdb
Tuli	Written by Jimmy Flores					
Tuli	Starring Desiree del Valle, Carlo Aquino, Vanna Garcia, Bembol Rocco, Amable Quiambao, Eugene Domingo					
The Unforeseen	Spectrum	Laura Dunn	U.S.	88	2007	sundance imdb
The Unforeseen	Written by unknown					
The Unforeseen	Starring unknown					
Waitress	Spectrum	Adrienne Shelly	U.S.	104	2006	sundance imdb
Waitress	Written by Adrienne Shelly					
Waitress	Starring Keri Russell, Nathan Fillion, Cheryl Hines, Jeremy Sisto, Andy Griffith, Eddie Jemison, Lew Temple					
Wonders Are Many	Spectrum	Jon Else	U.S.	94	2006	sundance imdb
Wonders Are Many	Written by Jon Else					
Wonders Are Many	Starring unknown					
Year of the Fish	Spectrum	David Kaplan	U.S.	96	2006	sundance imdb
Year of the Fish	Written by David Kaplan					
Year of the Fish	Starring Tsai Chin, Randall Duk Kim, Ken Leung, An Nguyen, Hettienne Park, Lee Wong					

== Sundance Collection ==
Title	Category	Director	Country	Minutes	Year	URL
River's Edge	Sundance Collection	Tim Hunter	U.S.	99	1986	sundance
River's Edge	Written by Neal Jimenez					
River's Edge	Starring Crispin Glover, Keanu Reeves, Ione Skye Leitch, Daniel Roebuck, Joshua Miller, Dennis Hopper					
X: The Unheard Music	Sundance Collection	W. T. Morgan	U.S.	84	1986	sundance
X: The Unheard Music	Written by W. T. Morgan					
X: The Unheard Music	Starring Exene Cervenka, John Doe, Billy Zoom and DJ Bonebrake					

== Shorts Program ==
Title	Category	Director	Country	Minutes	Year	URL
Bitch	Shorts Program	Lilah Vandenburgh	U.S.	15	2006	sundance
Bitch	Written by Lilah Vandenburgh					
Bitch	Starring Keira Leverton, Jaun Garcia, Katlin Rivers, Zia Harris, Kathy Bell-Denton					
Bomb	Shorts Program	Ian Olds	U.S.	14	2006	sundance
Bomb	Written by Ian Olds, Paul Felten					
Bomb	Starring Melissa Leo, John Magaro, Naomi Aborn, Michael McMonagle, Andrew Dolan, Michelle Maxson, Katherine Wallach, James Dawson, Harrison Roberts, Zane Raven					
Conversion	Shorts Program	Nanobah Becker	U.S.	9	2006	sundance
Conversion	Written by Nanobah Becker					
Conversion	Starring Charmaine Jackson-John, Simone Frazier, Deidra Castillo					
Cubs	Shorts Program	Tom Harper	United Kingdom	10	2006	sundance
Cubs	Written by Tom Harper					
Cubs	Starring Ashley Walters, Harry Eden					
Dad	Shorts Program	Daniel Mulloy	United Kingdom	8	2006	sundance
Dad	Written by Daniel Mulloy					
Dad	Starring Michael Gage, Joy McBrinn, Alex Macqueen					
The Dawn Chorus	Shorts Program	Hope Dickson Leach	U.S.	15	2006	sundance
The Dawn Chorus	Written by Hope Dickson Leach					
The Dawn Chorus	Starring Valerie Shusterov, Henry Glovinsky, Julie Kessler, Dave Rosenberg, Michael DiGioia, Fredda Lomsky, Robert Eigen, Keith Gerchak, Simon Feil, Raphael Fetta, John Gemberling					
The Day Out	Shorts Program	Jong Yoon Lee	South Korea	13	2006	sundance
The Day Out	Written by unknown					
The Day Out	Starring unknown					
Death to the Tinman	Shorts Program	Ray Tintori	U.S.	12	2006	sundance
Death to the Tinman	Written by Ray Tintori					
Death to the Tinman	Starring Jeff Delauter, Sophia Holman, Lee Pender, Marvin Illman, Michael Preston					
Der Ostwind	Shorts Program	Kohl Glass	U.S.	11	2006	sundance
Der Ostwind	Written by Kohl Glass					
Der Ostwind	Starring Patrick Rosier, Alex Schmalz					
Destiny Manifesto	Shorts Program	Martha Colburn	U.S.	9	2006	sundance
Destiny Manifesto	Written by unknown					
Destiny Manifesto	Starring unknown					
Doorman	Shorts Program	Etienne Kallos	U.S.	17	2006	sundance
Doorman	Written by Etienne Kallos, Diana Fithian					
Doorman	Starring Jamil Mena, Stephen Sheffer					
Dreams and Desires—Family Ties	Shorts Program	Joanna Quinn	United Kingdom	10	2006	sundance
Dreams and Desires—Family Ties	Written by Les Mills					
Dreams and Desires—Family Ties	Starring Menna Trussler, Rachel Atkins, Brendan Charleson					
Duct Tape and Cover	Shorts Program	Yong-Jin (Gene) Park	U.S.	4	2005	sundance
Duct Tape and Cover	Written by Yong-Jin (Gene) Park					
Duct Tape and Cover	Starring unknown					
Everything Will Be OK	Shorts Program	Don Hertzfeldt	U.S.	17	2006	sundance
Everything Will Be OK	Written by Don Hertzfeldt					
Everything Will Be OK	Starring unknown					
Family Reunion	Shorts Program	Ísold Uggadóttir	Iceland	19	2006	sundance
Family Reunion	Written by Ísold Uggadóttir					
Family Reunion	Starring Aðalbjörg Árnadóttir, Hanna María Karlsdóttir, Theodór Júlíusson, Grétar Snær Hjartarson, Amy Lewis, Alexander Briem					
The Fence	Shorts Program	Ricardo Iscar, Nacho Martin	Spain	12	2006	sundance
The Fence	Written by Ricardo Iscar, Nacho Martin					
The Fence	Starring unknown					
Freeheld	Shorts Program	Cynthia Wade	U.S.	40	2006	sundance
Freeheld	Written by unknown					
Freeheld	Starring unknown					
God Provides	Shorts Program	Brian Cassidy, Melanie Shatzky	U.S./Canada	9	2006	sundance
God Provides	Written by Brian Cassidy and Melanie Shatzky					
God Provides	Starring unknown					
Golden Age	Shorts Program	Aaron Augenblick	U.S.	22	2006	sundance
Golden Age	Written by Aaron Augenblick, Tim Harrod					
Golden Age	Starring Aaron Augenblick, Tim Harrod, Kamala Sankaram, M. Wartella					
Graceland	Shorts Program	Anocha Suwichakornpong	Thailand	17	2006	sundance
Graceland	Written by Anocha Suwichakornpong					
Graceland	Starring Sarawut Martthong, Jelralin Chanchoenglop					
The Grass Grows Green	Shorts Program	Jesus Beltran	U.S.	19	2006	sundance
The Grass Grows Green	Written by Jesus Beltran					
The Grass Grows Green	Starring Santiago Vasquez, Anthony Neil Moss, Mikel Seitz, Jazmin Dinh, Devynn Becerra, Abel Becerra, Catherine Montgomery, Joseph Norman, Eric Alvarez, Miriam Martinez, Jose Martinez, Uriel Acevedo, Miguel Aguchan, Raymond Beltran, Fernando Hernandez, Francisco Hernandez, Jesus Camarena					
Happiness	Shorts Program	Sophie Barthes	U.S.	11	2006	sundance
Happiness	Written by Sophie Barthes					
Happiness	Starring Elzbieta Czyzweska					
Hard to Swallow	Shorts Program	Mat Kirkby	United Kingdom	14	2006	sundance
Hard to Swallow	Written by Mat Kirkby					
Hard to Swallow	Starring Nicholas Burns, Richard Herring, Kerry Godliman, Katherine Parkinson, Claire Keelan, James Lance, Daisy Haggard					
High Falls	Shorts Program	Andrew Zuckerman	U.S.	33	2006	sundance
High Falls	Written by Alex Vlack					
High Falls	Starring Waris Ahluwalia, Maggie Gyllenhaal, Ebon Moss-Bachrach, Peter Sarsgaard, Charlie Tahan					
King	Shorts Program	Caran Hartsfield	U.S.	15	2006	sundance
King	Written by Caran Hartsfield					
King	Starring Novella Nelson, Hassan Manning					
Magnetic Poles	Shorts Program	Maria Rosenblum	U.S.	29	2006	sundance
Magnetic Poles	Written by Maria Rosenblum					
Magnetic Poles	Starring Marjie Gum, Aidan Demarest, Mike DiMaggio, Dave Anthony, John Fortson, Christie Lynn Smith, John Church					
Master of Reality	Shorts Program	Matthew Killip	United Kingdom	21	2006	sundance
Master of Reality	Written by unknown					
Master of Reality	Starring unknown					
Move Me	Shorts Program	Jonathan Pulley	U.S.	17	2006	sundance
Move Me	Written by Jonathan Pulley					
Move Me	Starring Kevin Lucero Less, John Pulley, Ian Delaney					
The Oates' Valor	Shorts Program	Tim Thaddeus Cahill	U.S.	14	2006	sundance
The Oates' Valor	Written by Tim Thaddeus Cahill					
The Oates' Valor	Starring Jordan David, Jack Moore, Amanda O'Brien, Whitney Rydbeck, Adele Jacques, Shannon Holt, Ryan Patterson, Conrad Apffel, Daniel Carpenter					
One Rat Short	Shorts Program	Alex Weil	U.S.	10	2006	sundance
One Rat Short	Written by Alex Weil					
One Rat Short	Starring unknown					
Paulina Hollers	Shorts Program	Brent Green	U.S.	15	2006	sundance
Paulina Hollers	Written by Brent Green					
Paulina Hollers	Starring Brent Green					
Peace Talk	Shorts Program	Jenifer Malmqvist	Sweden	14	2006	sundance
Peace Talk	Written and directed by: Jenifer Malmqvist, Cinematography: Mikael Jakobsen, Editor: Veronika Sjöholm, Music: Henrik Andersson					
Peace Talk	Starring Åsa Söderling Kajic (the mother), Ylva Larsson (Emilie), Josefina Blomberg (Jonna)					
Phantom Canyon	Shorts Program	Stacey Steers	U.S.	10	2006	sundance
Phantom Canyon	Written by Stacey Steers					
Phantom Canyon	Starring unknown					
Pop Foul	Shorts Program	Moon Molson	U.S.	20	2006	sundance
Pop Foul	Written by Moon Molson, Anthony Eleftherion					
Pop Foul	Starring Steven Clark, Sekou Laidlow, Danielle K. Thomas, Keith Bullard					
Salt Kiss	Shorts Program	Fellipe Gamarano Barbosa	Brazil	18	2006	sundance
Salt Kiss	Written by Fellipe Gamarano Barbosa					
Salt Kiss	Starring Rogério Trindade, Domingos Alcântara, Suzana Pires, Pollyana Simões, Sandra Simões, Mônica Besser, Juliana Gonçalves, Bruno Mendes, Eduardo Dargains					
Sophie	Shorts Program	Birgitte Stærmose	Denmark	14	2006	sundance
Sophie	Written by Dunja Gry Jensen & Birgitte Stærmose					
Sophie	Starring Trine Dyrholm, Thomas Gabrielsson, Jomi Massage.					
The Substitute	Shorts Program	Andrea Jublin	Italy	15	2006	sundance
The Substitute	Written by Andrea Jublin					
The Substitute	Starring Arianna Dal Buono, Andrea Jublin, Valentino Campitelli, Lorenzo De Cicco, Nicola De Feo, Lisa Galantini					
To Whom It May Concern	Shorts Program	Mitch McCabe	U.S.	13	2006	sundance
To Whom It May Concern	Written by unknown					
To Whom It May Concern	Starring unknown					
The Tragic Story of Nling	Shorts Program	Jeffrey St. Jules	Canada	15	2006	sundance
The Tragic Story of Nling	Written by Jeffrey St. Jules					
The Tragic Story of Nling	Starring Tom Barnett, John Neville, Steven McCarthy, Kate Campbell					
The Tube with a Hat	Shorts Program	Radu Jude	Romania	23	2006	sundance
The Tube with a Hat	Written by Florin Lazarescu					
The Tube with a Hat	Starring Gabriel Spahiu, Marian Bratu, Alexandru Georgescu, Natalia Calin					
William	Shorts Program	Eron Sheean	Australia	17	2006	sundance
William	Written by John Brumpton					
William	Starring Tom E. Lewis, Michael Longbottom, John Brumpton, Greg Stone, Pamela Young, Lillian Crombie, Kane McNay, Mark Coles Smith, Rebecca Moore					
Windowbreaker	Shorts Program	Tze Chun	U.S.	11	2006	sundance
Windowbreaker	Written by Tze Chun					
Windowbreaker	Starring Raymond Zhang, Fiona Chen, Ai Cheng, Bryan Farrell Wilson, Jeff Bellin, Emily Lodish, Trung Tang, Sean Stanco					
Zarin	Shorts Program	Shirin Neshat	U.S.	20	2006	sundance
Zarin	Written by unknown					
Zarin	Starring unknown					

== Shorts with Features ==
Title	Category	Director	Country	Minutes	Year	URL
Aftermath On Meadowlark Lane	Shorts with Features	David Zellner, Nathan Zellner	U.S.	6	2006	sundance
Aftermath On Meadowlark Lane	Written by David Zellner					
Aftermath On Meadowlark Lane	Starring Pam Bush, David Zellner, Nathan Zellner					
Ask the Insects	Shorts with Features	Steve Reinke	Canada	20	2006	sundance
Ask the Insects	Written by unknown					
Ask the Insects	Starring unknown					
Black and White Trypps Number Three	Shorts with Features	Ben Russell	U.S.	11	2007	sundance
Black and White Trypps Number Three	Written by unknown					
Black and White Trypps Number Three	Starring unknown					
Bobby Bird: The Devil In Denim	Shorts with Features	Carson D. Mell	U.S.	7	2005	sundance
Bobby Bird: The Devil In Denim	Written by Carson D Mell					
Bobby Bird: The Devil In Denim	Starring Carson D Mell					
The Fighting Cholitas	Shorts with Features	Mariam Jobrani	U.S.	20	2006	sundance
The Fighting Cholitas	Written by unknown					
The Fighting Cholitas	Starring unknown					
For a Swim with the Fish	Shorts with Features	Tara Autovino	U.S.	9	2006	sundance
For a Swim with the Fish	Written by Tara Autovino					
For a Swim with the Fish	Starring Tali Autovino, Hope Lancaster, Tami Autovino, the Weeki Watchi Mermaids					
Gratte-Papier (Penpusher)	Shorts with Features	Guillaume Martinez	France	8	2005	sundance
Gratte-Papier (Penpusher)	Written by Guillaume Martinez					
Gratte-Papier (Penpusher)	Starring Benjamin Bellecour, Gaëlle Brunet, Lucienne Troka, Régis Iacono, Régis Desfeux					
Goodbye Mr. Snuggles	Shorts with Features	Jonathan Hopkins	United Kingdom	6	2005	sundance
Goodbye Mr. Snuggles	Written by Jonathan Hopkins					
Goodbye Mr. Snuggles	Starring James Fox, Robert Hardy, Tony Bluto					
How She Slept At Night	Shorts with Features	Lilli Carré	U.S.	4	2006	sundance
How She Slept At Night	Written by unknown					
How She Slept At Night	Starring unknown					
I Just Wanted to Be Somebody	Shorts with Features	Jay Rosenblatt	U.S.	10	2006	sundance
I Just Wanted to Be Somebody	Written by Fenton Johnson					
I Just Wanted to Be Somebody	Starring Anita Bryant					
I Want to Be a Pilot	Shorts with Features	Diego Quemada-Diez	Kenya	11	2006	sundance
I Want to Be a Pilot	Written by Diego Quemada-Diez					
I Want to Be a Pilot	Starring Collins Otieno, Gaudencia Ayuma Shichenga, Kepha Onduru, Joseph Kyalo Kioko, Stephen Benz Alal, Merea					
In Passing	Shorts with Features	Christopher Thomas Allen, Robert Rainbow	United Kingdom	6	2006	sundance
In Passing	Written by Joe Welbon					
In Passing	Starring unknown					
Induction	Shorts with Features	Nicolas Provost	Belgium	10	2006	sundance
Induction	Written by Nicolas Provost					
Induction	Starring Isaka Sawadogo, Lorenza Goos, Arne Kinds, Eric Godon					
Infinite Delay	Shorts with Features	Kadet Kuhne	U.S.	9	2006	sundance
Infinite Delay	Written by unknown					
Infinite Delay	Starring unknown					
Interview	Shorts with Features	Charles Burmeister	U.S.	8	2006	sundance
Interview	Written by Charles Burmeister					
Interview	Starring Mark Kelly, Courtney Thomas, Larrs Jackson					
Light Work I	Shorts with Features	Jennifer Reeves	U.S.	8	2006	sundance
Light Work I	Written by unknown					
Light Work I	Starring unknown					
Little Farm	Shorts with Features	Calvin Reeder	U.S.	8	2006	sundance
Little Farm	Written by Calvin Reeder					
Little Farm	Starring Lindsay Pulsipher, Calvin Reeder, Forrest Fousel					
Make a Wish	Shorts with Features	Cherien Dabis	Palestinian territories	12	2006	sundance
Make a Wish	Written by Cherien Dabis					
Make a Wish	Starring Mayar Rantisse, Lone Khilleh, Iman Aoun					
Men Understand Each Other Better	Shorts with Features	Marjan Alizadeh	Iran	8	2006	sundance
Men Understand Each Other Better	Written by Marjan Alizadeh					
Men Understand Each Other Better	Starring Alireza Amir Hajebi, Maryam Yavari					
Mother Superior	Shorts with Features	Alex Mack (filmmaker), Diana Montero	U.S.	22	2005	sundance
Mother Superior	Written by Alex Mack, Diana Montero					
Mother Superior	Starring unknown					
Motodrom	Shorts with Features	Joerg Wagner	Germany	9	2006	sundance
Motodrom	Written by Joerg Wagner					
Motodrom	Starring Hugo Dabbert, Jagath Perera, Tomasz Wyszomirski					
The Nick In Time	Shorts with Features	Be' Garrett	U.S.	10	2006	sundance
The Nick In Time	Written by Be' Garrett & Shakima Landsmark					
The Nick In Time	Starring Isiah Whitlock, Keith E. Bullard, Jas Anderson, Curtiss Cook, Henry Afro Bradley, Count Stovall, Verania Kenton, George Miles					
Scaredycat	Shorts with Features	Andy Blubaugh	U.S.	13	2006	sundance
Scaredycat	Written by Andy Blubaugh					
Scaredycat	Starring Andy Blubaugh, Amber Blubaugh, Charlie Blubaugh, Solamon Ibe, Chris Thoms, Donniel Tisdale, Michael Williamson					
Songbird	Shorts with Features	John Thompson	U.S.	6	2006	sundance
Songbird	Written by John Thompson					
Songbird	Starring Janet Chiara, Jack Hunter					
Spitfire 944	Shorts with Features	William Lorton	U.S.	14	2006	sundance
Spitfire 944	Written by William Lorton					
Spitfire 944	Starring John S. Blyth, James R. Savage					
T. O. M.	Shorts with Features	Tom Brown, Daniel Gray	United Kingdom	3	2006	sundance
T. O. M.	Written by Tom Brown & Daniel Gray					
T. O. M.	Starring Kristy Cromwell					
Tanju Miah	Shorts with Features	Sadik Ahmed	British Bangladesh	13	2006	sundance
Tanju Miah	Written by unknown					
Tanju Miah	Starring unknown					
Trout	Shorts with Features	Johnny Barrington	United Kingdom	10	2006	sundance
Trout	Written by Johnny Barrington					
Trout	Starring Jamie Michie, Lorna Craig, Frank Gilhooley					
