= 2007 Sundance Film Festival =

Film festival in Park City, Utah

- Festival poster
- Opening film: Chicago 10
- Closing film: Life Support
- Location: Park City, Salt Lake City, Ogden, and Sundance, Utah
- Hosted by: Sundance Institute
- No. of films: 122
- Festival date: January 18–28, 2007
- Language: English
- Website: festival.sundance.org/2007
- 2008 Sundance Film Festival 2006 Sundance Film Festival

The 2007 Sundance Film Festival ran from January 18 until January 28, 2007, in Park City, Utah with screenings in Salt Lake City, Utah and Ogden, Utah. It was the 23-rd iteration of the Sundance Film Festival. The opening night film was Chicago 10; the closing night film was Life Support.

3,287 feature films were submitted, of which 1,852 were U.S films (compared to 1,764 in 2006) and 1,435 were international films (vs. 1,384 in 2006). From these, 122 feature films were selected and include 82 world premieres, 24 North American premieres, and 10 U.S. premieres from 25 countries. The festival had films from almost 60 first or second-time feature filmmakers.

== Juries ==
The juries at the Sundance Film Festival are responsible for determining the Jury Prize winners in each category and to award Special Jury Prizes as they see fit.

=== Jury, Independent Film Competition: Documentary ===
- Alan Berliner, Lewis Erskine, Lauren Greenfield, Julia Reichert, Carlos Sandoval

=== Jury, Independent Film Competition: Dramatic ===
Dawn Hudson, Elvis Mitchell, Catherine Hardwicke, Pamela Martin, Sarah Polley, George C. Wolfe

=== Jury, World Cinema Competition: Documentary ===
- Raoul Peck, Juan Carlos Rulfo, Elizabeth Weatherford

=== Jury, World Cinema Competition: Dramatic ===
- Carlos Bolado, Lynne Ramsay, U-Wei Bin Haji Saari

=== Jury, Shorts Competition ===
- Jared Hess, Daniela Michel, Mark Elijah Rosenberg

=== Alfred P. Sloan Feature Film Prize Jury ===
- John Underkoffler, Darren Aronofsky, Ann Druyan, Howard Suber, Dr. Brian Greene

== Films ==
For a full list of films appeared at the festival, see List of films at the 2007 Sundance Film Festival.

=== Premieres ===
| English title | Original title | Director(s) | Production country |
|---|---|---|---|
| An American Crime | | Tommy O'Haver | United States |
| Away From Her | | Sarah Polley | Canada |
| Black Snake Moan | | Craig Brewer | United States |
| Summer Rain | El Camino de los ingleses | Antonio Banderas | Spain |
| Chapter 27 | | Jarrett Schaefer | United States |
| Chicago 10 | | Brett Morgen | United States |
| Clubland | | Cherie Nowlan | Australia |
| The Good Night | | Jake Paltrow | United States |
| King of California | | Mike Cahill | United States |
| Life Support | | Nelson George | United States |
| Longford | | Tom Hooper | United Kingdom |
| The Nines | | John August | United States |
| Resurrecting the Champ | | Rod Lurie | United States |
| The Savages | | Tamara Jenkins | United States |
| Son of Rambow | | Garth Jennings | United Kingdom |
| Trade | | Marco Kreuzpaintner | United States |
| Year of the Dog | | Mike White | United States |

=== Independent Film Competition: Documentary ===
The 16 films below were chosen from 856 submissions by U.S. filmmakers and each film is a world premiere.

| English title | Original title | Director(s) | Production country |
|---|---|---|---|
| Banished | | Marco Williams | United States |
| Chasing Ghosts | | Lincoln Ruchti | United States |
| Crazy Love | | Dan Klores | United States |
| Everything's Cool | | Daniel B. Gold, Judith Helfand | United States |
| For the Bible Tells Me So | | Daniel Karslake | United States |
| Ghosts of Abu Ghraib | | Rory Kennedy | United States |
| Girl 27 | | David Stenn | United States |
| Hear and Now | | Irene Taylor Brodsky | United States |
| Manda Bala (Send a Bullet) | | Jason Kohn | United States |
| My Kid Could Paint That | | Amir Bar-Lev | United States |
| Nanking | | Bill Guttentag, Dan Sturman | United States |
| No End in Sight | | Charles Ferguson | United States |
| Protagonist | | Jessica Yu | United States |
| War/Dance | | Andrea Nix Fine, Sean Fine | United States |
| White Light/Black Rain: The Destruction of Hiroshima and Nagasaki | | Steven Okazaki | United States |
| Zoo | | Robinson Devor | United States |

=== Independent Film Competition: Dramatic ===
The 16 films below were chosen from 996 submissions and each film is a world premiere.

| English title | Original title | Director(s) | Production country |
|---|---|---|---|
| Adrift in Manhattan | | Alfredo de Villa | United States |
| Broken English | | Zoe Cassavetes | United States |
| Four Sheets to the Wind | | Sterlin Harjo | United States |
| The Good Life | | Steve Berra | United States |
| Grace Is Gone | | James C. Strouse | United States |
| Hounddog | | Deborah Kampmeier | United States |
| Joshua | | George Ratliff | United States |
| Never Forever | | Gina Kim | United States |
| On the Road with Judas | | J. J. Lask | United States |
| Padre Nuestro | | Christopher Zalla | United States |
| The Pool | | Chris Smith | United States |
| Rocket Science | | Jeffrey Blitz | United States |
| Snow Angels | | David Gordon Green | United States |
| Starting Out in the Evening | | Andrew Wagner | United States |
| Teeth | | Mitchell Lichtenstein | United States |
| Weapons | | Adam Bhala Lough | United States |

=== World Cinema Competition: Documentary ===
The 16 films below were chosen from 506 submissions.

| English title | Original title | Director(s) | Production country |
|---|---|---|---|
| Accident | Accidente | Cao Guimarães, Pablo Lobato | Brazil |
| Bajo Juárez: The City Devouring Its Daughters | Bajo Juárez: La ciudad devorando a sus hijas | José Antonio Cordero, Alejandra Sánchez | Mexico |
| Cocalero | Cocalero | Alejandro Landes | Bolivia/Argentina |
| Comrades in Dreams | | Uli Gaulke | Germany |
| Crossing the Line | | Daniel Gordon | United Kingdom |
| Three Comrades | Drie kameraden | Masha Novikova | Netherlands |
| Hot House | | Shimon Dotan | Israel |
| In the Shadow of the Moon | | David Sington | United Kingdom |
| Joe Strummer: The Future Is Unwritten | | Julien Temple | Ireland/United Kingdom |
| Manufactured Landscapes | | Jennifer Baichwal | Canada |
| The Monastery: Mr. Vig and the Nun | | Pernille Rose Grønkjær | Denmark |
| On a Tightrope | | Petr Lom | Norway/Canada |
| A Very British Gangster | | Donal Mac Intyre | United Kingdom |
| VHS—Kahloucha | | Nejib Belkadhi | Tunisia |
| Enemies of Happiness | Vores lykkes fjender | Anja Al Erhayem, Eva Mulvad | Denmark |
| Welcome Europa | | Bruno Ulmer | France |

=== World Cinema Competition: Dramatic ===
The 16 films below were chosen from 506 submissions.

| English title | Original title | Director(s) | Production country |
|---|---|---|---|
| Sweet Mud | Adama Meshuga'at | Dror Shaul | Israel |
| Driving with My Wife's Lover | Ane-eui Aein-eul Mannada | Kim Tai-sik | South Korea |
| The Night Buffalo | El Búfalo de la Noche | Jorge Hernandez Aldana | Mexico |
| Eagle vs Shark | | Taika Waititi | New Zealand |
| Ezra | | Newton I. Aduaka | France/Nigeria/Austria |
| Blame it on Fidel | La Faute à Fidel | Julie Gavras | France |
| Ghosts | | Nick Broomfield | United Kingdom |
| The Legacy | L' Héritage | Géla Babluani, Temur Babluani | France |
| How She Move | | Ian Iqbal Rashid | Canada |
| How Is Your Fish Today? | Jin tian de yu zen me yang? | Xiaolu Guo | United Kingdom |
| Khadak | | Peter Brosens, Jessica Woodworth | Germany/Belgium |
| Noise | | Matthew Saville | Australia |
| Drained | O Cheiro do Ralo | Heitor Dhalia | Brazil |
| Once | | John Carney | Ireland |
| The Island | Ostrov | Pavel Lungin | Russian Federation |
| Buried Dreams | Rêves de poussière | Laurent Salgues | Burkina Faso/Canada/France |

=== Frontier ===
| English title | Original title | Director(s) | Production country |
|---|---|---|---|
| 1st Light | | Paul Chan | United States |
| Academy | | R. Luke DuBois | United States |
| Cluster | | Lincoln Schatz | United States |
| Copenhagen Cycles | | Eric Dyer | United States |
| Klip//Effect | | Klip Collective | United States |
| The Last Dining Table | | Roh Gyeong-tae | South Korea |
| Lynn Hershman Leeson In Second Life | | Lynn Hershman Leeson | United States |
| Meet Me In Wichita | | Martha Colburn | United States |
| Mobiopera | | Shu Lea Cheang | United States |
| Offscreen | | Christoffer Boe | Denmark |
| Phantom Love | | Nina Menkes | United States |
| Pierre Huyghe Artist Spotlight | | Pierre Huyghe | France |
| Play | | R. Luke DuBois | United States |
| Slipstream | | Anthony Hopkins | United States |
| Soapbox Agitation #1: Proving Ground | | Travis Wilkerson | United States |
| Strange Culture | | Lynn Hershman Leeson | United States |
| You Are Here | | James Graham | United States |
| Zidane: A 21st Century Portrait | | Douglas Gordon, Philippe Parreno | United States |

== Awards ==
- Grand Jury Prize: Documentary - Manda Bala (Send a Bullet)
- Grand Jury Prize: Dramatic - Padre Nuestro
- Grand Jury Prize: World Cinema Dramatic - Adama Meshuga'at (Sweet Mud)
- Grand Jury Prize: World Cinema Documentary - Vores lykkes fjender (Enemies of Happiness)
- Audience Award: Documentary - Hear and Now
- Audience Award: Dramatic - Grace Is Gone
- World Cinema Audience Award: Documentary - In the Shadow of the Moon
- World Cinema Audience Award: Dramatic - Once
- Documentary Directing Award - Sean Fine and Andrea Nix Fine for War/Dance
- Dramatic Directing Award - Jeffrey Blitz for Rocket Science
- Excellence in Cinematography Award: Documentary - Heloisa Passos for Manda Bala (Send a Bullet)
- Excellence in Cinematography Award: Dramatic - Benoit Debie for Joshua
- Documentary Film Editing - Hibah Sherif Frisina, Charlton McMillan, and Michael Schweitzer for Nanking
- Waldo Salt Screenwriting Award: Dramatic - James C. Strouse for Grace Is Gone
- Special Jury Prize: Dramatic Performance - Jess Weixler in Teeth and Tamara Podemski in Four Sheets to the Wind
- Special Jury Prize: Dramatic - Chris Smith, director of The Pool
- Special Jury Prize: Documentary - No End in Sight
- Special Jury Prize: World Cinema Dramatic - L' Héritage (The Legacy)
- Special Jury Prize: World Cinema Documentary - Hot House
- Jury Prize in Short Filmmaking - Everything Will Be OK
- Jury Prize in International Short Filmmaking - The Tube With a Hat
- Honorable Mentions in Short Filmmaking - Death to the Tinman, The Fighting Cholitas, Men Understand Each Other Better (Mardha Hamdigar Ra Behtar Mifahmand), Motodrom, Spitfire 944, t.o.m.
- Special Jury Prize in Short Filmmaking - Freeheld
- 2007 Alfred P. Sloan Prize - Dark Matter

== Festival Theaters ==
- Park City
  - Eccles Theatre - 1,270 seats
  - Egyptian Theatre - 266 seats
  - Holiday Village Cinemas II - 156 seats
  - Holiday Village Cinemas III - 156 seats
  - Holiday Village Cinemas IIV - 164 seats
  - Library Center Theatre - 448 seats
  - Prospector Square Theatre - 352 seats
  - Racquet Club Theatre - 602 seats
  - Yarrow Hotel Theatre - Press and industry screenings
- Kimball Junction
  - Redstone Cinemas - 185 seats
- Salt Lake City
  - Broadway Centre Cinemas IV - 211 seats
  - Broadway Centre Cinemas V - 238 seats
  - Broadway Centre Cinemas VI - 274 seats
  - Rose Wagner Performing Arts Center - 477 seats
  - Tower Theatre - 342 seats
- Sundance Resort
  - Sundance Institute Screening Room - 164 seats
- Ogden
  - Peery's Egyptian Theatre - 800 seats
