= 2005 Sundance Film Festival =

- Festival poster
- Opening film: Happy Endings
- Location: Park City, Salt Lake City, Ogden, and Sundance, Utah
- Hosted by: Sundance Institute
- Festival date: January 20–30, 2005
- 2006 Sundance Film Festival 2004 Sundance Film Festival

The 2005 Sundance Film Festival was held in Utah from January 20 to 30, 2005.

It was held in Park City, with screenings in Salt Lake City; Ogden; and the Sundance Resort. It was the 21st iteration of the Sundance Film Festival.

== Awards ==
- Special Jury Prize for Editing – Murderball
- Audience Award Documentary – Murderball
- Audience Award Dramatic – Hustle & Flow
- Directing Award Documentary – Jeff Feuerzeig for The Devil and Daniel Johnston
- Directing Award Dramatic – Noah Baumbach for The Squid and the Whale
- Excellence in Cinematography Award Documentary – The Education of Shelby Knox
- Excellence in Cinematography Award Dramatic – Hustle & Flow
- Grand Jury Prize Documentary – Why We Fight
- Grand Jury Prize Dramatic – Forty Shades of Blue
- Honorable Mention in Short Filmmaking – One Weekend a Month
- Honorable Mention in Short Filmmaking – Small Town Secrets
- Honorable Mention in Short Filmmaking – Victoria Para Chino
- Honorable Mention in Short Filmmaking – Tama Tu
- Honorable Mention in Short Filmmaking – Ryan
- Honorable Mention in Short Filmmaking – Bullets in the Hood: A Bed-Stuy Story
- Jury Prize in Short Filmmaking – Family Portrait
- Jury Prize in International Short Filmmaking – Wasp
- Special Jury Prize Documentary – After Innocence
- Special Jury Prize for Acting – Amy Adams in Junebug
- Special Jury Prize for Acting – Lou Pucci in Thumbsucker
- Special Jury Prize for Originality of Vision Dramatic – Miranda July writer, director, and actor in Me and You and Everyone We Know
- Special Jury Prize for Originality of Vision Dramatic – Rian Johnson director of Brick
- Waldo Salt Screenwriting Award – Noah Baumbach for The Squid and the Whale
- World Cinema Jury Prize Documentary – Shape of the Moon
- World Cinema Jury Prize Dramatic – The Hero
- World Cinema Audience Award Dramatic – Brothers
- World Cinema Special Jury Prize Documentary – The Liberace of Baghdad
- World Cinema Special Jury Prize Documentary – Wall
- World Cinema Special Jury Prize Dramatic – The Forest for the Trees
- World Cinema Special Jury Prize Dramatic – Live-In Maid
- 2005 Alfred P. Sloan Prize - Grizzly Man

== Juries ==
The juries at the Sundance Film Festival are responsible for determining the Jury Prize winners in each category and to award Special Jury Prizes as they see fit.

- US Documentary competition: Stacy Peralta, Jehane Noujaim, Steve James, Jean-Philippe Boucicaut, Gail Dolgin
- US Dramatic competition: Chris Eyre, Vera Farmiga, John C. Reilly, B. Ruby Rich, Christine Vachon
- World Documentary competition: Penny Woolcock, Jean Perret, Miriam Cutler
- World Dramatic competition: Antonia Bird, Mike Goodridge, Fernando León de Aranoa
- Shorts Competition: Sam Green, Ernest Hardy
- Alfred P. Sloan Feature Film Prize: Peggy LeMone, Shane Carruth, John Underkoffler, Lawrence Krauss, Miguel Arteta

== Films ==
=== Independent Film Competition: Documentary ===
English title	Original title	Director(s)	Production country
After Innocence		Jessica Sanders	United States
The Aristocrats		Paul Provenza	United States
The Devil and Daniel Johnston		Jeff Feuerzeig	United States
The Education of Shelby Knox		Marion Lipschutz, Rose Rosenblatt	United States
Enron: The Smartest Guys in the Room		Alex Gibney	United States
The Fall of Fujimori		Ellen Perry	United States
Frozen Angels		Eric Black, Frauke Sandig	United States
Mardi Gras: Made in China		David Redmon	United States
Murderball		Henry-Alex Rubin, Dana Adam Shapiro	United States
New York Doll		Greg Whiteley	United States
Ring of Fire: The Emile Griffith Story		Dan Klores, Ron Berger	United States
Romántico		Mark Becker	United States
Shakespeare Behind Bars		Hank Rogerson	United States
Trudell		Heather Rae	United States
Twist of Faith		Kirby Dick	United States
Why We Fight		Eugene Jarecki	United States

=== Independent Film Competition: Dramatic ===
English title	Original title	Director(s)	Production country
Between		David Ocañas	United States
Brick		Rian Johnson	United States
The Dying Gaul		Craig Lucas	United States
Ellie Parker		Scott Coffey	United States
Forty Shades of Blue		Ira Sachs	United States
How the Garcia Girls Spent Their Summer		Georgina Garcia Riedel	United States
Hustle & Flow		Craig Brewer	United States
Junebug		Phil Morrison	United States
Loggerheads		Tim Kirkman	United States
Lonesome Jim		Steve Buscemi	United States
Me and You and Everyone We Know		Miranda July	United States
Police Beat		Robinson Devor	United States
Pretty Persuasion		Marcos Siega	United States
The Squid and the Whale		Noah Baumbach	United States
Thumbsucker		Mike Mills	United States
Who Killed Cock Robin?		Travis Wilkerson	United States

=== World Cinema Competition: Documentary ===
English title	Original title	Director(s)	Production country
The 3 Rooms of Melancholia	Melancholian 3 huonetta	Pirjo Honkasalo	Finland
Dhakiyarr vs. the King		Tom Murray, Allan Collins	Australia
Grizzly Man		Werner Herzog	United States
I Am Cuba, The Siberian Mammoth	Soy Cuba, O Mamute Siberiano	Vicente Ferraz	Brazil
El Inmortal		Mercedes Moncada	Nicaragua, Spain, Mexico
The Liberace of Baghdad		Sean McAllister	United Kingdom
Odessa, Odessa		Michale Boganim	Israel, France
Shake Hands with the Devil: The Journey of Roméo Dallaire		Peter Raymont	Canada
Shape of the Moon	Stand van de maan	Leonard Retel Helmrich	Netherlands
Unknown White Male		Rupert Murray	United Kingdom
Wall	Mur	Simone Bitton	France, Israel
Yang Ban Xi: The 8 Modelworks		Yan Ting Yuen	Netherlands

=== World Cinema Competition: Dramatic ===
English title	Original title	Director(s)	Production country
Brothers	Brødre	Susanne Bier	Denmark
Crónicas		Sebastián Cordero	Ecuador, Mexico
The Forest for the Trees	Der Wald vor lauter Bäumen)	Maren Ade	Germany
Green Chair	Noksaek uija	Park Chul-soo	South Korea
The Hero	O Herói	Zézé Gamboa	Angola, Portugal, France
Kekexili: Mountain Patrol	可可西里	Lu Chuan	China
Lila Says	Lila dit ça	Ziad Doueiri	France, Italy, United Kingdom
Live-In Maid	Cama adentro	Jorge Gaggero	Spain, Argentina
Monsterthursday	Monstertorsdag	Arild Østin Ommundsen	Norway
On a Clear Day		Gaby Dellal	United Kingdom
Palermo Hollywood		Eduardo Pinto	Argentina
Stranger	Ono	Małgorzata Szumowska	Poland
This Charming Girl	Yeoja, Jeong-hye	Lee Yoon-ki	South Korea
Tony Takitani	トニー滝谷	Jun Ichikawa	Japan
Unconscious	Inconscientes	Joaquín Oristrell	Spain, Portugal, Italy, Germany
Wolf Creek		Greg McLean	Australia

=== Premieres ===
English title	Original title	Director(s)	Production country
3-Iron	Bin-jip	Kim Ki-duk	South Korea
The Ballad of Jack and Rose		Rebecca Miller	United States
The Chumscrubber	Glück in kleinen Dosen	Arie Posin	United States, Germany
Dear Wendy		Thomas Vinterberg	United Kingdom, Denmark, France, Germany
Drum		Zola Maseko	South Africa
Game 6		Michael Hoffman	United States
The Girl from Monday		Hal Hartley	United States
Happy Endings		Don Roos	United States
Heights		Chris Terrio	United States
Inside Deep Throat		Fenton Bailey, Randy Barbato	United States
The Jacket		John Maybury	United States
Kung Fu Hustle	功夫	Stephen Chow	Hong Kong, China
Lackawanna Blues		George C. Wolfe	United States
Layer Cake		Matthew Vaughn	United Kingdom
Loverboy		Kevin Bacon	United States
Marilyn Hotchkiss' Ballroom Dancing & Charm School		Randall Miller	United States
The Matador		Richard Shepard	United States, Germany, Ireland, United Kingdom
MirrorMask		Dave McKean	United Kingdom, United States
Mysterious Skin		Gregg Araki	United States, Netherlands
Nine Lives		Rodrigo García	United States
Reefer Madness: The Movie Musical		Andy Fickman	United States
Rory O'Shea Was Here		Damien O'Donnell	Ireland, United Kingdom, France
Snowland	Schneeland	Hans W. Geißendörfer	Germany
The Upside of Anger		Mike Binder	United States

=== Special Screenings ===
English title	Original title	Director(s)	Production country
Ballets Russes		Dayna Goldfine, Dan Geller	United States
The Garden		Frederick Wiseman	United States
March of the Penguins	La Marche de l'empereur	Luc Jacquet	France
Protocols of Zion		Marc Levin	United States
Reel Paradise		Steve James	United States
Rock School		Don Argott	United States

=== American Spectrum ===
English title	Original title	Director(s)	Production country
212		Anthony Ng	United States
5th World		Blackhorse Lowe	United States
Duane Hopwood		Matt Mulhern	United States
High School Record		Ben Wolfinsohn	United States
Love, Ludlow		Adrienne Weiss	United States
Mitchellville		John D. Harkrider	United States
The Motel		Michael Kang	United States
The Puffy Chair		Jay Duplass, Mark Duplass	United States
Rize		David LaChapelle	United States
The Salon		Mark Brown	United States
Saving Face		Alice Wu	United States
Steal Me		Melissa Painter	United States
Swimmers		Doug Sadler	United States
The Talent Given Us		Andrew Wagner	United States
This Revolution		Stephen Marshall	United States

=== Park City at Midnight ===
English title	Original title	Director(s)	Production country
9 Songs		Michael Winterbottom	United Kingdom
Dirty Love		John Mallory Asher	United States
Hard Candy		David Slade	United States
Matando Cabos		Alejandro Lozano	Mexico
Old Boy	Oldŭboi	Park Chan-wook	South Korea
Strangers with Candy		Paul Dinello	United States
Three... Extremes	Sāngēng 2	Fruit Chan, Park Chan-wook, Takashi Miike	Hong Kong, Japan, South Korea
What Is It?		Crispin Glover	United States

=== Frontier ===
English title	Original title	Director(s)	Production country
Film Actions V		Luke Savisky	United States
The Joy of Life		Jenni Olson	United States
Room		Kyle Henry	United States
Sugar		Patrick Jolley, Reynold Reynolds	United States
Symbiopsychotaxiplasm: Take 2 1/2		William Greaves	United States
Tropic of Cancer		Eugenio Polgovsky	Mexico

=== Online ===
English title	Original title	Director(s)	Production country
Beyond the Fire: Teen Experiences of War		Sesh Kannan	United States
Forest Grove		Maya Churi	United States
How-to-Bow		Nora Krug	United States
Julia 1926		Johannes Weymann	Germany
Stand by Your Guns		Jillian McDonald	United States

=== Sundance Collection ===
English title	Original title	Director(s)	Production country
Harlan County, USA		Barbara Kopple	United States
Stranger Than Paradise		Jim Jarmusch	United States

=== Short films ===
==== US Dramatic ====
English title	Original title	Director(s)	Production country
The Act		Susan Kraker, Pi Ware	United States
America's Biggest Dick		Bryan Boyce	United States
American Fame, Pt. 2: Forgetting Jonathan Brandis		Cam Archer	United States
Among Thieves		Oscar Daniels	United States
Are You the Favorite Person of Anybody?		Miguel Arteta	United States
Billy's Dad Is a Fudge-Packer!		Jamie Donahue	United States
Broadcast 23		Tom Putnam	United States
Choked		Brad Barnes	United States
Cry for Help		Nicholas McCarthy	United States
Eating		Rebecca Cutter	United States
Estes Avenue		Paul Cotter	United States
Everything's Gone Green		Aaron Ruell	United States
Exactly		Lisa Leone	United States
Flotsam/Jetsam		David Zellner	United States
Goodnight Irene		Sterlin Harjo	United States
Husk		Brett A. Simmons	United States
In the Morning		Danielle Lurie	United States
In Time		Maurice A. Dwyer, Adetoro Makinde	United States
The Last Full Measure		Alexandra Kerry	United States
Late Bloomer		Craig William Macneill	United States
Let the Good Times Roll		Harry Dodge, Stanya Kahn	United States
Love and Laundry		Barbara Alvarez	United States
Mary		Aaron Ruell	United States
Motion Studies #3: Gravity		Jake Mahaffy	United States
Oh My God		John Bryant	United States
One Weekend a Month		Eric Escobar	United States
Planet of the Arabs		Jacqueline Salloum	United States
Pura Lengua (All Tongue)		Aurora Guerrero	United States
The Raftman's Razor		Keith Bearden	United States
Raw		Tonia Lynn Barber	United States
The Sailor's Girl		Brett Simon	United States
Spelling Bee		Phil Dornfeld	United States
Staring at the Sun		Toby Wilkins	United States
Swim Test		Alex Chung	United States
A Thousand Roads		Chris Eyre	United States
Un dia en la vida		Marco Orsini	United States
West Bank Story		Ari Sandel	United States
The Youth in Us		Joshua Leonard	United States

==== US Documentary ====
English title	Original title	Director(s)	Production country
Bullets in the Hood: A Bed-Stuy Story		Terrence Fisher and Daniel Howard	United States
Dimmer		Talmage Cooley	United States
The Fair		Jason Rayles	United States
Family Portrait		Patricia Riggen	United States
The Last Days of Jonathan Perlo		Joe Warson	United States
Recycle		Vasco Nunes, Ondi Timoner	United States
Saving Jackie		Selena A. Burks	United States
Seal Hunting with Dad	Natchiliagniaqtuguk Aapagalu	Andrew Okpeaha MacLean	United States
Small Town Secrets		Katherine Leggett	United States

==== US Animated ====
English title	Original title	Director(s)	Production country
9		Shane Acker	United States
A Buck's Worth		Tatia Rosenthal	United States
The Meaning of Life		Don Hertzfeldt	United States
Motel		Thor Freudenthal	United States

==== International Dramatic ====
English title	Original title	Director(s)	Production country
Being Bad		Laurence Coriat	United Kingdom, France
Berocca		Martin Taylor	United Kingdom
Elephant Palm Tree		Kara Miller	United Kingdom
Elke's Visit		Morgan Dews	Spain
Email to Mom	Email a mamá	Gerardo Ruiz Miñán	Peru
From Cherry English		Jeff Barnaby	Canada
Fuel		Nash Edgerton	Australia
Green Bush		Warwick Thornton	Australia
Home Game	Hjemmekamp	Martin Lund	Norway
Kid	Chamaco	Tim Parsa	Mexico
Matálo!		Jean-Stéphane Sauvaire	France
Mother's Day	Kare Kare Zvako	Tsitsi Dangarembga	Zimbabwe
Pizza Shop		Mark Mainguy	Canada
Plains Empty		Beck Cole	Australia
Stronger		Debra Felstead	Canada
Tama Tū		Taika Waititi	New Zealand
Tongue Bully		Annie Bradley	Canada
Victoria para chino		Cary Fukunaga	United States, Mexico
Waiting for the Man		Rob Stefaniuk	Canada
Wasp		Andrea Arnold	United Kingdom
With Diva	Con Diva	Sebastian Mantilla	Spain
With What Shall I Wash It?	Con qué la lavaré?	María Trénor	Spain

==== International Documentary ====
English title	Original title	Director(s)	Production country
The Children of Leningradsky	Dzieci z Leningradzkiego	Hanna Polak, Andrzej Celinski	Poland
Meet Michael Oppenheim		Roni Abulafia	Israel
Porter	Solo un cargador	Juan Alejandro Ramírez	Peru

==== International Animated ====
English title	Original title	Director(s)	Production country
The Birthday	Syntymäpäivä	Kari Juusonen	Finland
Fallen Art	Sztuka spadania	Tomasz Bagiński	Poland
It's Like That		Southern Ladies Animation Group	Australia
MOO(N)		Leigh Hodgkinson	United Kingdom
Ryan		Chris Landreth	Canada
Through My Thick Glasses	Gjennom mine tykke briller	Pjotr Sapegin	Norway, Canada
