= Breakable You =

Novel by Brian Morton

- First edition
- Author: Brian Morton
- Language: English
- Publisher: Houghton Mifflin Harcourt
- Pages: 368
- ISBN: 0151011923
- Preceded by: A Window Across the River

Breakable You is the fourth novel written by American author Brian Morton. It was published in 2006 by Houghton Mifflin Harcourt. The book was made into a 2017 film starring Holly Hunter, Tony Shalhoub and Alfred Molina.

== Characters ==
The story, like most of Morton's books, focuses around three or four central characters, and the omniscient point of view changes between them in each chapter.

List of main characters:a

- Maud Weller is a college graduate in her late twenties. She is described as 5'10', having brown hair and awkward but attractive features. She teaches a philosophy class at an unknown university, and in the story is writing her dissertation on "how people treat each other". In the book, Morton alludes to Maud being somewhat mentally unstable, having had two mental breakdowns in her lifetime already. Later in the book, Maud has a third and is checked into a rehab center that she attended before.
- Samir is an Arab man and the love interest of Maud Weller. He remodels homes, but it's not exactly his passion in life, and he is described as very intellectual. He is also much shorter than Maud, which is something that Maud comes to like in him. He is very emotionally shut-down when he first starts dating Maud, and he reveals that it is due to his daughter's death and divorcing his wife, which happened some time ago.
- Eleanor Weller is the mother of Maud Weller, and she is in her sixties. She works as a therapist, but she's always had a yearning to publish a memoir of her family life growing up. She finds that her problem is that she wants to take care of people too often, and leaves her dreams on the side.
- Adam Weller is the father of Maud Weller and previous husband to Eleanor Weller before their divorce. Adam is a novelist of some moderate fame in New York and has published several novels. He is old too, and is in fear of being lost in the crowd of a youthful world.

== Minor characters ==
- Thea is the love interest of Adam Weller. She is a much younger woman and is described as hip, youthful, fiery and very beautiful. She is also very instrumental to Adam and furthering his reputation as an author.
- Isador Cantor is a novelist and friend of Adam Weller. He never appears in the novel, having died shortly before the story takes place but he is very important to Adam's storyline. He has always been Adam's main adversary in the literary world, and Adam thinks that Izzy is a better writer than he.

== Critical reception ==
The book was well reviewed by critics. The New York Times gave it a positive review, writing: "Terrible fates befall some of Morton’s characters, undeserved; he seems, at times, to bring them to life only to make them suffer. It’s a complaint usually reserved for a higher power, and a tribute to Morton’s craft: conjuring up lives so vivid the reader mourns their passing." The New York Sun wrote "Breakable You has succeeded in demonstrating, once again, Mr. Morton's appealing and humane gift."
