= Breakable You (film) =

- Film poster
- Directed by: Andrew Wagner
- Written by: Andrew Wagner; Fred Parnes
- Based on: Breakable You by Brian Morton
- Produced by: Kevin Fitzmaurice Comer
- Starring: Holly Hunter; Tony Shalhoub; Alfred Molina
- Cinematography: Harlan Bosmajian
- Edited by: Gena Bleier
- Music by: Adam Gorgoni
- Production company: Harmoney Productions
- Release dates: January 7, 2017 (Palm Springs); March 13, 2018
- Running time: 120 minutes
- Country: United States
- Language: English

Breakable You is a 2017 American comedy-drama film written and directed by Andrew Wagner and starring Holly Hunter, Tony Shalhoub and Alfred Molina.

A couple's divorce has profound reverberations for their entire extended family. It is based on Brian Morton's 2006 novel of the same name.

It premiered at the Palm Springs International Film Festival and was released digitally on March 13, 2018.

== Plot ==
Eleanor and Adam Weller meet in a NYC café to finalize their divorce. His overly friendly chattiness irritates her, so she loses her temper when he says he can't attend their daughter Maud's graduation. Adam has an opening night of his old play in London. It reminds Ellie of past European showings of his plays, which often masked his infidelity. Her anger wells up and they almost cause a scene.

Meanwhile, Maud is in Adam's apartment, working on her PhD and flirting with Sam, who's renovating the kitchen. Uncomfortable with the attention, he discourages her.

When Ruth Frank calls for Adam yet again, Ellie pressures him to call her. Although she's his best friend Vincent's grieving widow, he isn't empathetic as five years have passed since his death.

Meeting with her thesis advisor Brian, Maud blocks his pass as he wants to rekindle their affair. She refuses, pointing out committing adultery when her thesis is on morality is hypocritical. 15 Eleanor vents to a fellow psychiatrist about a female patient with marital problems. Viewing her as passive, she confides that she'd like to tell her to end her marriage, but knows she's projecting because of her own failed marriage.

Adam and his new partner Sandrine meet his biggest critic Richard Gordon, who's writing a critical biography about Vincent. The couple creates an excuse to cut the meeting short. Soon afterwards, Adam finally goes to Ruth's. She brings out an unpublished play of Vincent's and requests he confirm it is good.

On Friday night, Maud goes out with Sam. Samir is Lebanese and so distant because his eight-year-long marriage ended after their six-year-old daughter died. Simultaneously, Eleanor is out with Adam's brother Paul, who tells her his marriage has just ended. Insisting his brother is an idiot for losing her upsets Eleanor, who hurries to the bathroom. On her return, Paul gives her a passionate kiss, which earns him a slap.

Adam's producer, dentist Ken Yates, calls to both check on Sandrine's toothache and congratulate him on his play's impending opening in London. Adam requests he seek a revival of the work on Broadway. He meets with Richard again briefly to give him a snippet on Vincent but discourages him from contacting Ruth, supposedly as it'd be too painful for her.

Soon after Eleanor apologises for the slap, in Paul's hotel room, and says she wouldn't want to jeopardize their friendship, they are soon all over each other. Maud and Sam start to have a moment in Central Park, but he gets too emotional as he talks about his deceased daughter Zahra. After some time passes, she offers him no-strings-attached sex.

Going to Ruth's, Adam convinces her that Vincent's play isn't viable. A few weeks later, just after Ken breaks the news about his unsuccessful Broadway revival, they hear of Ruth's death. Adam speaks at a memorial in her apartment, where her daughter inadvertently lets him into Ruth's bedroom, so he gets the play's original manuscript.

Caught up with editing and retyping the play, Adam sends Sandrine to Ken's benefit alone. Once he's finished he shuts out Robert's biography project. Then he submits it to his agent Judith Singer, who recognizes its potential.

Adam approaches Sam for the lead, who initially vehemently opposes. Eleanor and Maud meet, sharing their news: a relationship with Paul and a pregnancy with Sam, respectively. Sam is transformed by the news. He stops being reclusive, auditions for and gets the lead in Adam's play. Until then, Maud didn't know Sam was an actor.

For most of the pregnancy Maud has morning sickness. As predicted by Eleanor, she gets overwhelmed. A short time after the birth, Maud checks herself into a mental salud facility, cutting herself off to everyone but her parents.

Meanwhile, as Maud's parents went to the birth without their partners, afterwards they sleep together. The next day, Eleanor ends things with Paul to focus on Maud and Rosie. Sam starts to feel overwhelmed in rehearsals, but Adam suggests he shoulder through it.

Adam visits Maud in the facility, confessing the play is not really his. They both admire each other, she his strength and he her ability to reach her deepest feelings. Sam and Rosie visit, and not long after is opening night.

Everyone comes to the very successful play. Afterwards, Eleanor gets Adam to admit where the play came from. Even Richard and the NYT praise him.

In the end, Eleanor goes to Cincinnati to be with Paul, and Maud is happily together with Sam and Rosie.

== Cast ==
- Holly Hunter as Eleanor Weller
- Tony Shalhoub as Adam Weller
- Alfred Molina as Paul Weller
- Cristin Milioti as Maud Weller
- Omar Metwally as Samir Kamali
- Caroline Aaron as Judith Singer
- Brooke Adams as Ruth Frank
