= Simon Feil =

American actor

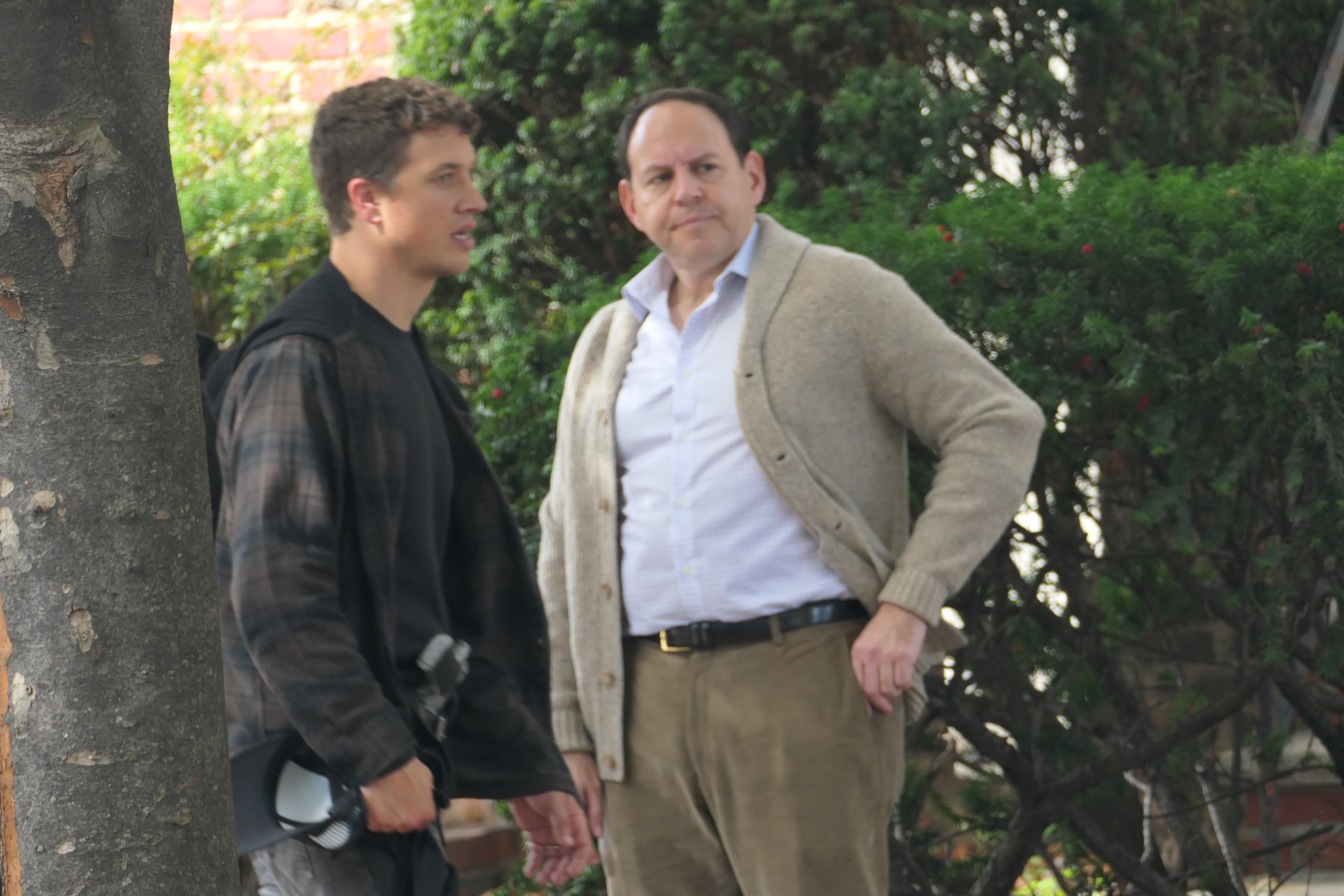
- Simon Feil (2025)
- Occupations: Actor, Narrative & Presence Coach
- Years active: 2005–present
- Notable work: Gotham, House of Cards, Julie & Julia
- Website: SimonFeil.com

Simon Feil is an American actor.

== Career ==
He appears on the Fox show Gotham episode 1.16, portraying a Board Member of Wayne Enterprises, in House of Cards episode 1.7 as the VP's Chief of Staff, in episode 5.8 of Nurse Jackie and, in Elementary, episode 2.3. His first major film appearance was in Julie & Julia, where he played a G.I. in Julia Child's course at the Cordon Bleu. He also appeared in The Dawn Chorus, which screened at the 2007 Sundance Film Festival, in which he portrayed a member of an Orthodox Jewish choir that had been in a plane crash and returns to the scene of the accident every year to commemorate the event.

Feil also appeared off-Broadway in the cult hit Boozy-The Life, Death, and Subsequent Vilification of Le Corbusier and, More Importantly, Robert Moses produced by Les Freres Corbusier, which sold out its off-off Broadway run at the Ohio Theater prior to opening night in 2005.

Other work includes a print campaign in New York City for Manhattan Mini Storage in which he portrayed a gay doctor, hosting a promotional tour as "Rick" for Trivial Pursuit's 1990s Edition which hit 8 cities in 2003 with celebrities from the 1990s such as Naomi Judd, Carnie Wilson, Josie Bissett and Baseball Hall of Famer Ozzie Smith. In 2007, Feil appeared in a national commercial for Klondike ice cream, playing one of NASCAR driver Kasey Kahne's pit-crew who is stunned when Kahne stops mid-race to thank the crew for a job well-done.

In January 2008, he began voicing "Negrology" spots for "The Super Rumble Mix Show", an online comedy variety series for Super Deluxe produced by Aaron McGruder and starring John Witherspoon and Gary Anthony Williams. Over the Summer and Fall of 2009, he voiced radio spots for Mayor Michael Bloomberg's re-election campaign.
