= Adam Gorgoni =

American composer

- Born: 16 December 1963 (age 61); New York City, New York, United States
- Genres: Film composition
- Occupation: Composer

Adam Gorgoni (born 16 December 1963 in New York City) is a prolific composer of film and TV scores and has composed music for over 20 films, including Candyman: Day of the Dead, Waiting..., The Dead Girl, Breakable You, Starting Out in the Evening and Aliens in America.
