= On the Road with Judas =

2007 film by J. J. Lask

- Film poster
- Directed by: J. J. Lask
- Written by: J. J. Lask
- Based on: On the Road with Judas by J. J. Lask
- Produced by: Amy Slotnick; Ronan P. Nagle
- Starring: Aaron Ruell; Kevin Corrigan; Eddie Kaye Thomas; Eleanor Hutchins; Amanda Loncar; Alex Burns; Leo Fitzpatrick
- Cinematography: Ben Starkman
- Edited by: J. J. Lask; Jason Kileen
- Music by: Human
- Production companies: PS 260; All Day Buffet Films
- Release date: January 21, 2007 (Sundance)
- Running time: 100 minutes
- Country: United States
- Language: English

On the Road with Judas is a 2007 American comedy-drama film written, directed, and co-edited by J. J. Lask (in his directorial debut). It stars an ensemble cast including Aaron Ruell, Kevin Corrigan, Eddie Kaye Thomas, Eleanor Hutchins, Amanda Loncar, Alex Burns, and Leo Fitzpatrick. Based on Lask's 2002 novel of the same name, it follows a man who leads a double life as a successful entrepreneur and a petty criminal.

== Cast ==
- Aaron Ruell as Judas - Real
- Kevin Corrigan as JJ Lask
- Eddie Kaye Thomas as Judas - Actor
- Amanda Loncar as Serra - Actress
- Eleanor Hutchins as Serra - Real
- Alex Burns as Francis - Real
- Leo Fitzpatrick as Francis - Actor
- Jim Parsons as Jimmy Pea
- J. J. Lask as Rubin Parker Jr.

== Reception ==
On the review aggregator website Rotten Tomatoes, 50% of 6 critics' reviews are positive, with an average rating of 4.3/10.

Emanuel Levy stated, "Lask's narrative is more convoluted than complex. […] In the end, the film makes sense – at least some sense – but I'm not sure that many viewers will take the long, bumpy road to get there."

Todd McCarthy of Variety called the film "far more infatuated with its own cleverness than audiences are likely to be" and commented, "Next time out, Lask might want to get out of his own head a bit and into the real world and invite the viewer to meet him halfway."

James Greenberg of The Hollywood Reporter wrote, "Clever and moderately entertaining, [the] film is a puzzle that will find some supporters as surely as it will sharply divide audiences."

Steven Rosen of Screen Daily opined, "On the Road with Judas is especially reminiscent of Michel Gondry's The Science of Sleep, although it lacks that film's wonderfully imaginative cinematography."

Anthony Kaufman of IndieWire remarked, "The film is not as confounding as it first seems, nor is it as clever." Kaufman also described it as "a slick, boy-meets-girl meta-movie that takes its inspirations from Charlie Kaufman and Woody Allen" and lauded, "All the actors, it should be noted, do a fine job."
