= Swimmers (2005 film) =

- Film poster
- Directed by: Doug Sadler
- Written by: Doug Sadler
- Produced by: Melanie Backer; David Leitner; Michael Yanko
- Starring: Tara Devon Gallagher; Sarah Paulson; Robert Knott; Cherry Jones; Shawn Hatosy
- Cinematography: Rodney Taylor
- Edited by: Affonso Gonçalves; Susan Korda; Lilah Park
- Release date: January 22, 2005 (Sundance)
- Running time: 90 minutes
- Country: United States
- Language: English

Swimmers is a 2005 American independent drama about a waterman's family on Chesapeake Bay's eastern shore. It premiered at the Sundance Film Festival on January 22, 2005, and won the Grand Jury Prize for Best New American Film from the Seattle International Film Festival. The title and theme of the film were inspired by the Latin name for the Chesapeake Bay's indigenous Maryland blue crab – Callinectes sapidus – Callinectes translates as "beautiful swimmers."

== Plot ==
Set in a small waterfront town in coastal Maryland, Swimmers is a film that focuses on Emma Tyler, a fiercely intelligent and observant 11-year-old, in the beginning as a young swimmer she wearing red/navy one piece swimsuit, TCY navy swim cap and goggles. and jumps off the dive starting block and swims freestyle, who develops an ear problem requiring surgery that the Tylers can ill afford. Emma's father, Will, drinks a lot and lives hand to mouth as a waterman. Her mother, Julia, has become a miserable soul, trying to keep a household together on meager funds. She also suspects that Will is having an affair.

Unable to pursue swimming, Emma searches for other ways to spend the summer. Feeling neglected by her parents, she befriends Merrill, a young woman who has returned to town to confront her past. Their friendship helps both characters address their personal difficulties. Merrill also develops a relationship with Emma’s older brother Clyde, but unresolved events from her past threaten her relationships with the family.

Will and Julia love their daughter immensely, but suffer from the financial woes of a poor fishing season, the sudden loss of Will's boat and Will's fierce pride in not having to ask for handouts.

== Casting ==
- Tara Devon Gallagher plays the pivotal role of 11-year-old Emma Tyler, in the beginning wearing red/navy swimsuit one-piece. TCY swim-cap and goggles. and jumps off the diving-starting-block in freestyle whose passion for swimming is suddenly disrupted by an ear injury requiring expensive surgery. Although Gallagher never had an acting class before – much less ever acted, she beat out hundreds of other preteens from New York, Los Angeles and Maryland. Producers said that they were blown away in her initial audition when they asked her to improvise a line of dialog in the script. Sadler says, "it was clear she was seeing and experiencing those things in her mind's eye."
- Robert Knott as Will Tyler, a Chesapeake Bay waterman who struggles to hold onto his livelihood. Sadler discovered Knott through actor Ed Harris, who had served as one of Sadler's advisors at the Sundance Institute Directing Workshop and had previously cast Knott as his brother in his critically acclaimed film, Pollock. Harris was so impressed with the Swimmers script that he had shown it to Knott before there was any discussion about who would play Will Tyler in the film.
- Cherry Jones as Julia Tyler, the fiercely determined wife of Will Tyler. Jones says of her character, "She's the matriarch of a family who's bottoming out, and she has got to be the glue that binds everything together."
- Shawn Hatosy as Clyde Tyler, the second son who becomes the town's patrolman rather than a waterman like his dad. From the moment Hatosy received the script for Swimmers he said the story really affected him, saying "The story and the way Doug wrote it – from the perspective of the little girl – just found its way into me." Being from Maryland originally, Hatosy also had a real soft spot for anything that has to do with his home state. Aware that the production would be auditioning actors the following week, he called producer Melanie Backer and persuaded her to accompany him to a screening of his latest film, Dallas 362. Backer, who was already a Hatosy fan from his work in Outside Providence immediately arranged a meeting with writer-director Doug Sadler. Several hours later, Hatosy had the role.
- Sarah Paulson as Merrill, the mysterious, kohl-eyed beauty who suddenly turns up in town in a desperate attempt to understand her own emotionally troubled past. Swimmers casting director Ellen Parks first spotted Paulson in the 1998 off-Broadway hit, Killer Joe, with Scott Glenn and Amanda Plummer.

== Reception ==
Swimmers was an official selection of the Sundance Film Festival's American Spectrum showcase and finalist for the Humanitas Prize. The festival called the movie "a uniquely American story that combines an Arthur Miller sense of drama with emotive Edward Hopperesque photography. Swimmers draws us in as naturally as the tide with the sharp reflections of its truth and humanity."

Daniel Wible of Film Threat described the film as "idyllically filmed" and having "a wonderfully evocative sense of place." Commenting on the film's water motif, Wible said, "Sadler and cinematographer Rodney Taylor draw exquisite visual parallels between the gentle rise and fall of the tide and the banal rhythms of daily seaside life. Their use of water as a timeless surrogate for life, hope, and even death, is particularly interesting, if not entirely original." About the performances, Wible said, "the film's cast is uniformly authentic and mesmerizing" but that, "Swimmers is ultimately young Tara Devon Gallagher's film. The rookie actress improbably delivers a profoundly mature performance that belies her experience."

Desson Thomson of The Washington Post wrote that overall, "Swimmers is an unhurried delight with persuasive performances, particularly from the beguiling Gallagher. And it evokes a memorable world -- dark mornings on the Chesapeake as watermen take out their chugging boats; silhouettes on piers; and the glistening of wriggling crabs in the sun."

The film has an 83% rating on Rotten Tomatoes.
