= The Talent Given Us =

- Directed by: Andrew Wagner
- Written by: Andrew Wagner
- Release dates: June 11, 2004 (CineVegas International Film Festival); June 17, 2005 (United States)
- Running time: 97 minutes
- Country: United States
- Language: English

The Talent Given Us is a 2004 film by Andrew Wagner. Most of the cast is Wagner's own family.

Roger Ebert praised The Talent Given Us as "one of the most original, daring, intriguing, and honest films of the year," while 2004 CineVegas juror Wendy Mitchell, writing about the film for indieWIRE last year, said that the movie "could qualify as the bravest movie I have ever seen." It was later named to indieWIRE's list of the best films of 2004 without distribution.
