= J. J. Lask =

American novelist

- Born: June 15, 1970 (age 56); Manhattan, New York, US

J. J. Lask (born June 15, 1970) is an American director, screenwriter, novelist, and editor. His debut novel was published in 2002 titled On The Road With Judas; it was later made into a film of the same name in 2007 and premiered at the Sundance Film Festival.

== Biography ==
Lask was born and raised in Manhattan, New York, of Jewish descent with brother Marlin Lask, son of Bernice and Seymour Lask. He grew up in the Kips Bay neighborhood during the turbulent times of the 1980s which shaped his artist self.

From eleven years old Lask worked production assisting on commercial sets on school holidays and summer breaks to earn money and learn film production and film making. In 1988 Lask dropped out of high school and enrolled in the Lee Strasberg Theatre Institute and became an intern at The Actors Studio and Wooster Group. During that time Lask began writing his debut novel, [On The Road With Judas], which was published in 2002. The novel has enjoyed breakout success in underground black markets due to its subject matter of crime on college campuses.

In 1998 Lask began a career as a commercial film editor and has won awards for his work.

In 2003 Lask started his own production company, All Day Buffet and editorial company, PS260.

In 2007 Lask's first feature film On The Road with Judas starring Kevin Corrigan, Eddie Kaye Thomas and Aaron Ruell debuted at the 2007 Sundance Festival. It has since become a mainstay at domestic and international film festivals.

== Filmography ==
- On the Road with Judas (2007)
