= Maya Churi =

Maya Churi is a writer and media artist who has been creating online interactive narratives since 1999 starting with her project 'Letters From Homeroom and continuing with Forest Grove' in 2005. To make Forest Grove, which runs about 45-minutes, Churi wrote a feature-length screenplay, then created a scale model of the story's community and used still images and graphics for the visual design. Forest Grove screened as part of the Sundance Film Festival's online program in 2005, and was, like Letters From Homeroom, recognized as a compelling contribution to the evolving world of interactive storytelling.

== Forest Grove ==
Forest Grove is an Internet-based narrative that tells the story of Charlie, a fourteen-year-old boy who swims across his gated community, an idyllic residence where happiness is secured and security is guaranteed. Hopping from pool to pool he encounters various neighbors, meets strange inhabitants, and even falls in love. But the Arcadian world of Forest Grove is not as picture perfect as Charlie once thought. Forced to flee the community Charlie’s world comes crashing down when the secrets of his past rise to the surface. To emphasize the spatial experience of living in a gated community the set for the story is an architect's model of Forest Grove. The model is approx. 8ft. x 12ft. and includes 36 houses, 12 swimming pools, a community center, and a guards station. Still photographs were taken of miniature styrene plastic people enacting the scenes and then edited/animated (with the use of Flash) to create a complete story that is accessible online. By manipulating how the audience navigates through the story it draws the audience, like the residents of Forest Grove, into a false sense of control over their lifestyle -- focusing on patterns, rules and laws designed to contribute to "quality of life", but in reality take it away.

Selected screenings of Forest Grove

- Sundance Film Festival (2005) – Park City, UT
- Seoul Net Fest (2005) – Seoul, Korea – Winner Best Web Work
- Filmstock Film Festival (2005) – UK

== Letters From Homeroom ==
Letters From Homeroom is a multi-media fiction web site that tells the story of Alix and Claire, two sophomores in high school, through the letters they pass to each other during class. The web site consists of seventeen video, audio and text versions of the correspondence. Viewers can move in and out of the three different media elements to assemble the complete story. The site also offers viewers a chance to become a part of the correspondence, in the Bathroom viewers can post their own notes about what is going on in the story, or what their own experiences are. There is also a Locker room page, which contains histories of the characters and links to the personal web sites of the main girls that include journal entries that start where the film leaves off.

Screenings and installations of Letters From Homeroom

- FILE/Festival Internacional De Linguagem Eletronica (2003)
- La Fabbrica del Vapore, Curated by Creative Time (2001) – Milan, Italy
- Seoul Net Fest (2001) – Seoul, Korea
- Walker Art Center (2001) – Minneapolis
- Hamburg Film festival (2001) – Hamburg, Germany
- Sundance Film Festival (2000) – Park City, UT
- Streaming Media Festival (2000) – Philadelphia, PA
- Prince Music Theatre (2000) – Philadelphia, PA

== Grants and awards ==
- 2005 Seoul Net Fest, Winner Best Web Work
- 2003 New York State Council on the Arts, Individual Artist Award
- 2001 Jerome Foundation, Media Arts Award
- 2000 Creative Capital Grant, Emerging Fields
- 1998 MacDowell Colony Fellow
- 1995 Helena Rubenstein Scholar, New York University
