= Banished (film) =

- Directed by: Marco Williams
- Produced by: Marco Williams; Maia Harris
- Edited by: Kathryn Barnier; Sandra Christie
- Music by: David Murray
- Release date: 2008
- Running time: 87 minutes
- Country: United States
- Language: English

Banished: How Whites Drove Blacks Out of Town in America is a 2008 documentary film about three of the U.S. cities which violently expelled African-American families in post-Reconstruction America. The film depicts incidents in Arkansas, Missouri, and Georgia that occurred between 1886 and 1923. Banished was screened in competition at the 2007 Sundance Film Festival.

== See also ==
General

- Mass racial violence in the United States
- Nadir of American race relations
- Sundown town

Specific events

- 1912 racial conflict in Forsyth County, Georgia
- Rosewood massacre (1923) / Rosewood (film)
- Tulsa race massacre (1921)
