= Manda Bala (Send a Bullet) =

- Theatrical release poster
- Directed by: Jason Kohn
- Produced by: Joey Frank; Jason Kohn; Jared Ian Goldman
- Cinematography: Heloísa Passos
- Edited by: Doug Abel; Jenny Golden; Andy Grieve
- Distributed by: City Lights Pictures
- Release date: 2007
- Running time: 85 minutes
- Country: United States
- Languages: Portuguese; English

Manda Bala (Send a Bullet) is a 2007 American documentary film directed by Jason Kohn about corruption and kidnapping in Brazil.

Kohn has said "I really thought of Manda Bala as a non-fiction RoboCop depicting a very real, broken, and violent society." It premiered January 20, 2007 at the 2007 Sundance Film Festival where it won the Grand Jury Prize for Documentary and the Excellence in Cinematography award. It had a limited release in North America beginning on August 17, 2007. On March 18, 2008, Manda Bala won the award for Outstanding Achievement in Nonfiction Feature Filmmaking at the inaugural Cinema Eye Honors.

== Synopsis ==
Manda Bala sheds light on the corruption and class conflicts in Brazil through the experiences from different subjects, such as a businessman who bullet-proofs his cars; a plastic surgeon who reconstructs the ears of kidnap victims; former Governor and Senator Jáder Barbalho; a powerful Brazilian politician from the state of Pará who used a frog farm for money laundering, and the owner of the frog farm himself (see SUDAM).

This film details many of the reasons for Brazil's corruption including the fact that Brazil's politicians in office are exempt from civilian court proceedings, with the consequence that they will never be punished for crimes they commit in office. Another factor — and the other driving point of the film — is the ubiquity of kidnapping in Brazil, which ensures that the likelihood of redressing these crimes is fairly low and that someone's enemies (political or otherwise) are apt to disappear fairly easily.

=== Interview subjects ===
Frog Farmer
A frog farmer who genuinely enjoys his trade. His wife asked him to make a choice, keep her or keep the frogs, and the frog farmer chose the frogs. The frog farms were used by Jader Barbalho to illegally launder money.
Businessman
After telling a story about how he was robbed while sitting in traffic, he discusses how unsafe he feels driving in São Paulo and decided to start bulletproofing cars, because according to him, being without a bulletproof car "would be crazy".
Head of Kidnapping Unit
Talks about how commonplace kidnappings are and how difficult they are to resolve successfully and his belief that the government should be involved in solving and preventing kidnappings. Also shows off some of his bullet scars from his dangerous line of work.
Victim
A victim of a kidnapping who had her ears cut off goes into detail about how her captors made her sleep in cramped quarters with only a bucket to use the bathroom, a TV blaring Hitchcock films, and how they sent pieces of her ear to her family.
Federal Police Marshal
Discusses the details of his investigation into the frog farm's money laundering and corruption and how the initial evidence was gathered against Jader Barbahlo.
Kidnapper
Discusses how a kidnapping is planned. Also discusses what happens when a person cannot pay their ransom, and how he and his organization take care of the poor when they need it, paving streets, giving out food, and other various projects. He then compares himself to a politician that gives to the poor instead of the ones that are in place that have forgotten the poor. Not shown in the film, the kidnapper was later shot by the police in late 2006.
Jader Barbalho
Discusses the Amazon region (the poorest region of Brazil), why SUDAM failed, and when the subject of the Frog Farm comes up, he responds that "I would need more time to talk to you about that, but this is....this is no" and promptly ends the interview.

== Awards ==
- Grand Jury Prize: Documentary at the 2007 Sundance Film Festival.
- Excellence in Cinematography Award: Documentary for Heloisa Passos at the 2007 Sundance Film Festival.
- Winner of the Special Grand Jury Prize at the 2007 BRITDOC Film Festival
- Outstanding Achievement in Nonfiction Feature Filmmaking at the Cinema Eye Honors
- Outstanding Achievement in Editing at the Cinema Eye Honors
- Outstanding Achievement in Cinematography at the Cinema Eye Honors
- Special Jury Award at the 2007 Rome International Film Festival

== Critical reception ==
As of May 12, 2008, the film had a score of 80% on Rotten Tomatoes based on 45 reviews. On Metacritic, the film had a score of 74 out of 100 based on 5 reviews. The movie was criticized by a Brazilian film critic, who thought that the violence was sensationalized. A scene where two kids where playing as kidnappers cutting off the ears of their abductees terrified the critic, making him asking the director about it. Kohn replied that he asked the children to do that, which prompted the critic Hudson Moura to think if the movie was just opportunist or it fails with "social ethics".

Awards
| Preceded by God Grew Tired of Us | Sundance Grand Jury Prize: U.S. Documentary; 2007 | Succeeded by Trouble the Water |
