= On a Tightrope =

- Directed by: Petr Lom
- Produced by: Torstein Grude
- Cinematography: Petr Lom
- Edited by: Petr Lom
- Distributed by: Tour de Force (Norway); Transit Films (International)
- Release date: March 30, 2007 (Norway)
- Language: Uyghur

On a Tightrope (2007) is a documentary film by Petr Lom, co-produced by Piraya Film and Lom Films, in cooperation with the Rafto Foundation for Human Rights.

== Synopsis ==
The film revolves around four children living in an orphanage in Xinjiang province, China. The children are Uyghurs, members of China's largest Muslim minority. Their dream is to become tightrope walkers, an ancient Uyghur tradition.

The children start learning to tightrope walk, but within a few months, they are judged inadequate by their coach. Now some of their dreams change: one wants to become a teacher, another a professional singer. One of them however, feels he is simply too small to be good at anything. Eventually, even the one judged most talented at tightrope walking, and the one who dreams of a place in the Guinness Book of World Records for tightrope walking, is let go by the unscrupulous coach who seems only interested in money.

One year later, a different coach comes to the orphanage. Through love and kindness, he turns the children's initial failure at tightrope walking into success. The film culminates with their performance on a high wire – without a safety net – in front of their entire home town.

Tightrope walking is in this movie a metaphor for how the Uyghurs try to balance between their Muslim faith and living in a communist state, where they are severely restricted in practicing their religion. This is the first film to ever document Chinese policy on religion in Xinjiang.

== Awards ==
- Won – Warsaw International Film Festival 2006, Watch Doc Award
- Won – Chicago International Documentary Festival 2007, Grand Prix, Short.
- Nominated – One World Media Awards, London2007.

== See also ==
- List of Islamic films
- Islam in China
- Uyghur people
