= Aaron Ruell =

American director and photographer

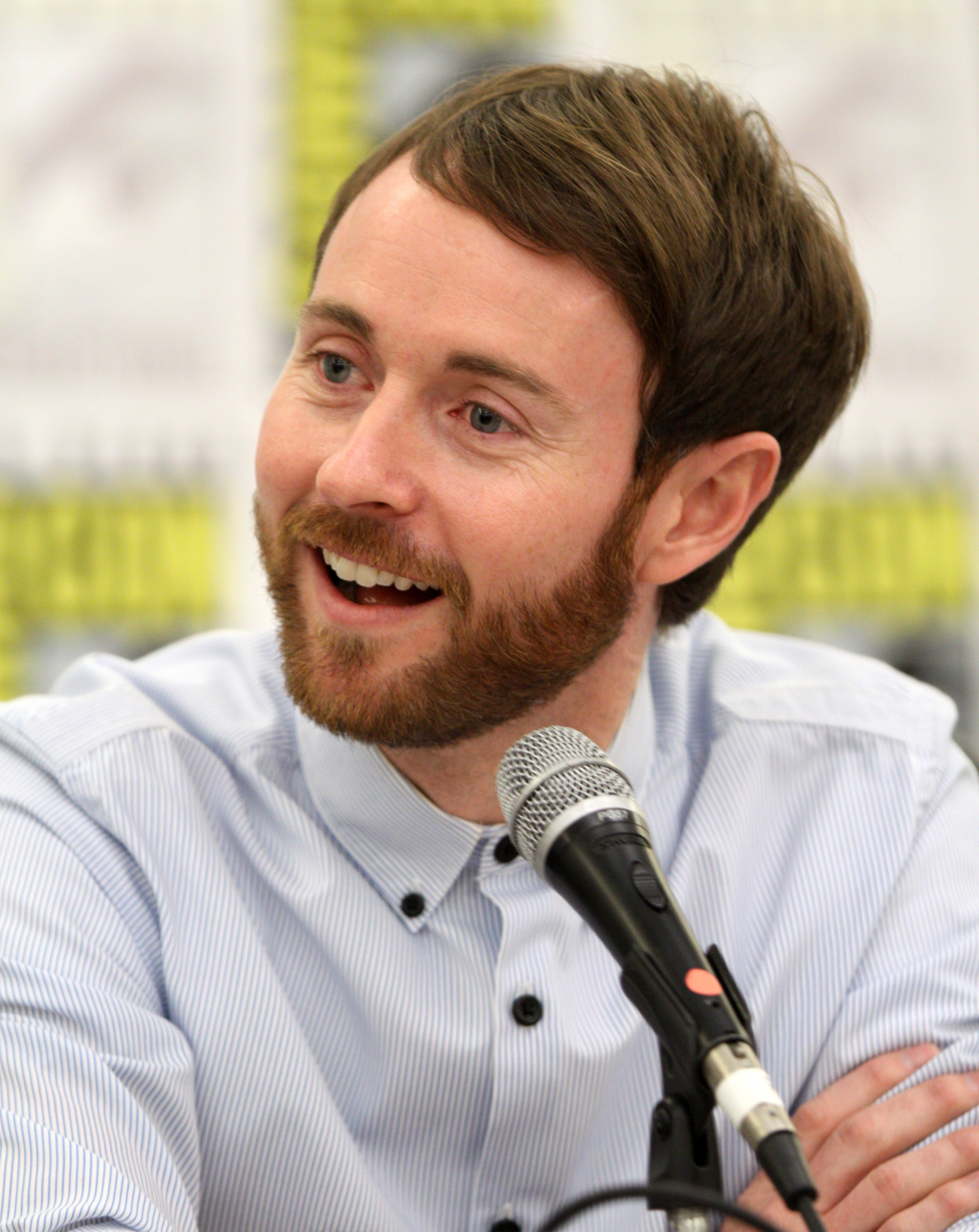
- Ruell at San Diego Comic-Con in 2011.
- Born: Derek Aaron Ruell; June 23, 1976 (age 50); Fresno, California, U.S.
- Occupations: Director; photographer; actor
- Years active: 2001–Present

Derek Aaron Ruell (born June 23, 1976) is an American director, photographer and actor. He is most recognized for his performance as Kip Dynamite in the indie movie Napoleon Dynamite.

== Early life and education ==
Ruell was born in Fresno, California and raised in a Mormon family in the nearby town of Clovis. After graduation from Clovis West High School, Ruell studied film at Brigham Young University.

== Career ==
=== Director ===
Ruell is an accomplished commercial director and photographer. As a director, he is represented by Sanctuary in Los Angeles. He was declared one of the most promising new directors in the world of advertising by Shoot magazine in 2009, and "one of the emerging directors to know now" by Creativity. He has directed commercials for clients such as T-Mobile, Nintendo, Coke, and Burger King.

He was the only filmmaker to have two films, Everything's Gone Green and Mary, which he wrote and directed, premiere at the 2005 Sundance Film Festival.

=== Actor ===
Ruell is best known for playing the role of Kipland Dynamite in the movie Napoleon Dynamite. In 2007, he starred in On the Road with Judas, which premiered in the Dramatic Competition section of the 2007 Sundance Film Festival. Ruell played a successful New York businessman who led a double life as a computer thief.

== Personal life ==
Ruell and his wife, Julia Yuka Ruell, were at one time members of the Los Angeles Latebirds, an official Moped Army branch. They currently reside in Portland, Oregon after having resided in Pasadena, California.

== Filmography ==
Film
| Year | Film | Role | Other notes |
|---|---|---|---|
| 2004 | Napoleon Dynamite | Kipland Ronald "Kip" Dynamite | |
| 2006 | The Problem with Percival | Social Worker | Short film |
| 2006 | Think Tank | | |
| 2007 | On the Road with Judas | Judas | |
Television
| Year | Title | Role | Notes |
| 2005 | Super Robot Monkey Team Hyperforce Go! | Suupa | Voice Role; Episode: Brothers in Arms |
| 2012 | Napoleon Dynamite | Kipland Ronald "Kip" Dynamite | Voice Role; Regular |

== Awards and nominations ==
Teen Choice Awards

- 2005: Nominated, "Choice Movie Rockstar Moment" - Napoleon Dynamite
