= Andrew Wagner =

American film director

Andrew Wagner is an American film director. He is best known for directing the drama Starting Out in the Evening (2007).

== Career ==
Wagner made his feature film debut by directing the experimental comedy The Talent Given Us (2004), which starred several members of his own family. He followed this up with the literary drama Starting Out in the Evening (2007), which was based on a novel by Brian Morton and starred Frank Langella. The film was a significant critical success. Wagner's third film, Breakable You (2017), is another drama adapted from one of Morton's novels.

Wagner's production company is Daddy W Productions.

== Personal ==
Wagner is an alumnus of The Collegiate School. He received degrees in Creative Writing and Psychology from Brown University. He received an M.F.A. at the AFI Conservatory where he was a Directing Fellow.

Wagner is the son of Allen Wagner and Judy Wagner, and the brother of Emily Wagner and Maggie Wagner. All appeared in The Talent Given Us. Wagner is married to Chelsea Gilmore.

== Filmography ==
- Breakable You (2017)
- Starting Out in the Evening (2007)
- The Talent Given Us (2004)
