= Roh Gyeong-tae =

South Korean film director (born 1972)

- Born: 1972 (age 53–54); South Korea
- Occupations: Film producer, director, screenwriter

Korean name
- Hangul: 노경태
- RR: No Gyeongtae
- MR: No Kyŏngt'ae

Roh Gyeong-tae (Korean: 노경태; born 1972) is a South Korean film producer, director and screenwriter.

== Personal life ==
Born in 1972, Roh studied at KAIST and was a former stockbroker at Sam-Sung Securities Company. He later graduated with Master of Fine Arts from San Francisco Art Institute.

== Career ==
Roh made numerous experimental short films before he debuted with his first feature film The Last Dining Table in 2006. He emerged as a major talent with his second feature Land of Scarecrows (2008) which won and shared the New Currents Award with Masahide Ichii's Naked of Defenses at the 2008 Busan International Film Festival.

== Filmography ==
- The Last Dining Table (2006) – director, screenwriter
- Land of Scarecrows (2008) – director, screenwriter, producer, writer
- Black Dove (2011) – director, script editor
- Black Stone (2015) – director, screenwriter, producer
