= Brian Morton (American writer) =

American fiction writer and English professor

- Born: 1955 (age 70–71); Teaneck, New Jersey, U.S.
- Education: Teaneck High School; Sarah Lawrence College
- Occupation: Author
- Spouse: Heather Harpham
- Writing career
- Genre: Fiction
- Notable work: Breakable You (2006)
- Notable awards: Guggenheim Fellow (2001)

Brian Morton (born 1955) is an American author of seven books, including five works of fiction and one memoir. He is the former director of the MFA Writing Program at Sarah Lawrence College. He currently teaches at Sarah Lawrence College, New York University, and The Bennington Writing Seminars.

Morton's 1998 novel Starting Out in the Evening was adapted into the 2007 film of the same name. His 2006 novel Breakable You was adapted into the 2017 film of the same name.

== Early life and education ==
Morton was born and raised in Teaneck, New Jersey, where he attended Teaneck High School. His father was an Irish-Catholic and a union organizer, and his mother was Jewish, and a school teacher. His mother was from a family of artists. Her brother was a composer, and her father (Morton's grandfather) was an actor in Yiddish theater. He has an older sister who wrote stories as a child.

He graduated from Sarah Lawrence College in 1978.

== Career ==
In 1984, a few months after his father died, Morton began to write a portrait of him. The character of Francis Xavier Burke of The Dylanist is an idealized version of his father. In 1988 he finished the book. In 1988 he was working as a co-editor for the book review of the magazine Dissent, where he became executive editor in 1995. Through his connections at Dissent, Morton found Harvey Klinger as an agent who loved the book. Ted Solotaroff at HarperCollins purchased the book, which received critical praise. In the following decades, Morton wrote four additional works of fiction. In 2022, Morton published Tasha: A Son's Memoir, which chronicles his complex relationship with his mother, whose worsening dementia caused her health to decline.

== Books ==
Morton has received a great deal of praise for his fiction.

Of The Dylanist, Carolyn See wrote in The Los Angeles Times: "How hard it is to write about a wonderful book where nothing 'happens' except precious life. All I can say is: This is one to buy, to read. It echoes in the brain, as your own life unfolds."

Writing in Newsday, Charles Taylor called Starting Out in the Evening "the kind of book that gets you reading novels in the first place What seems more important is that, finally, it’s the kind of book that keeps you reading novels."

Reviewing A Window Across the River in the Palm Beach Post, Scott Eyman wrote: "Brian Morton is some strange kind of magician; his novels have the luminous transparency of a great city at twilight. The vocabulary is basic, but the emotions aren't; the people are artists, but the questions they ponder which is more important, our responsibility to ourselves or to the people we love? are universal."

In his appraisal of Breakable You in The Chicago Tribune, Art Winslow noted: " One thing Morton is to be complimented on is the honesty of the emotional complex he builds into his characters, in which no set of feelings escapes being alloyed with elements of its opposite."

Kirkus Reviews summed up its notice of Florence Gordon by saying: "Always a pleasure to read for his well-drawn characters, quiet insight and dialogue that crackles with wit, Morton here raises his own bar in all three areas. He also joins a sadly small club of male writers who have created memorable heroines."

In September 2025, Morton published a nonfiction book on the subject of writing, Writing as a Way of Life, through Black Lawrence Press. The Massachusetts Review noted: "What Morton has done in his book is a refreshingly original engagement with the notion of a craft book. There are no empty platitudes about how one might become a great novelist, nor fastidious childhood recalls... This is not a self-help book on how to write. This is about the devotion to writing as a way of life."

Bibliography

- The Dylanist (HarperCollins, 1991)
- Starting Out in the Evening (Mariner Books, 1998)
- A Window Across the River (Mariner Books, 2003)
- Breakable You (Mariner Books, 2006)
- Florence Gordon (Mariner Books, 2014)
- Tasha: A Son's Memoir (Avid Reader Press / Simon & Schuster, 2022)
- Writing as a Way of Life (Black Lawrence Press, 2025)

== Awards ==
- Starting Out in the Evening received the Academy Award in Literature from the American Academy of Arts and Letters and the Koret Jewish Book Award for Fiction. It was a finalist for the PEN/Faulkner Award.
- Morton received a 2001 Guggenheim Fellowship.
- A Window Across the River was chosen as a bookclub selection for The Today Show.
- Florence Gordon was a finalist for the 2014 Kirkus Prize for Fiction.

== Personal life ==
Morton lives with his partner Heather Harpham, a drama teacher, performer and author of a memoir, Happiness: The Crooked Little Road to Semi-Ever After. Together they have two sons, Emmett and Gabriel.
