= Marco Williams =

American film director

Marco Williams is a documentary filmmaker and professor of film production at Northwestern University. His films have received several awards, including the Gotham Documentary Achievement Award for Two Towns of Jasper, and he has been nominated three times for the Sundance Film Festival grand jury prize.

Banished (2007), directed and produced by Williams, tells the story of three American communities where 100 years ago white residents forced thousands of black families to flee their homes. The film documents black descendants as they return to confront their shocking histories. The film was awarded the Knight Grand Jury Prize for Documentary Features at the Miami International Film Festival and the Full Frame Documentary Festival Spectrum Award.

Williams' film Freedom Summer (2006), won a primetime Emmy Award for the series: Ten Days that Unexpectedly Changed America.

Williams' film Two Towns of Jasper (co-directed by Whitney Dow) received the 2004 George Foster Peabody Award and the 2004 Alfred I duPont Silver Baton. It is the winner of the 2002 Pan African Film Festival Outstanding Documentary Award, the Hot Docs Canadian International Film Festival Silver Award for Best International Documentary (2002); it is also the recipient of the 2002 DoubleTake/Full Frame grand prize: The Center For Documentary Studies Filmmaker Award, and the winner of the 2002 Independent Feature Project Third Annual Anthony Radziwill Documentary Achievement Award. Two Towns of Jasper was broadcast on POV on PBS, the film and the directors were featured on The Oprah Winfrey Show, Nightline with Ted Koppel, and the film was the catalyst for a live town hall meeting—“America in Black and White”, anchored by Ted Koppel.

In 1994, Williams and six other young filmmakers, including P.J. Pesce and Academy Award nominee Bernard Joffa (the 1990 Best Live Action Short 'Senzeni Na?'), were featured in movie journalist Billy Frolick's book called 'What I Really Want to Do Is Direct: Seven Film School Graduates Go to Hollywood'. The book followed the lives of seven young, would-be directors over three years as they struggled with the ups-and-downs of the Hollywood world.

He graduated from Harvard University and UCLA School of Film.

== "The Undocumented" (2013) ==
Supported by ITVS and the Ford Foundation, The Undocumented tells the stories of migrants who have died in the Arizona desert, and follows them on their long journey home. The film is woven from multiple narrative threads. In Arizona, it depicts the efforts of the Pima County Medical Examiner and the Mexican Consulate of Tucson to name unidentified dead border crossers with the ultimate goal of returning them to their families. It also follows US Border Patrol Search and Rescue (BORSTAR) agents, who must balance law enforcement with lifesaving. In Mexico, the film documents the reunification of the dead with their families and chronicles stories of loved ones who disappeared while crossing the border, never to be heard from again. The film is scheduled to air on PBS in late 2010 or early 2011.

== Filmography ==
- Banished (2007)
- Ten Days That Unexpectedly Changed America: Freedom Summer (2006)
- MLK Boulevard (2003)
- Two Towns of Jasper (2002)
- In Search of Our Fathers (1992)
- Without a Pass (1991)

== Teaching ==
Williams has been a full-time professor for twenty-five years. He currently teaches at Northwestern University. Prior to joining Northwestern he was a professor at NYU for twenty-years. Prior to teaching at NYU, he taught for four years at North Carolina School of the Arts.
