= Cinematic style of Christopher Nolan =

Filmmaking style of Christopher Nolan

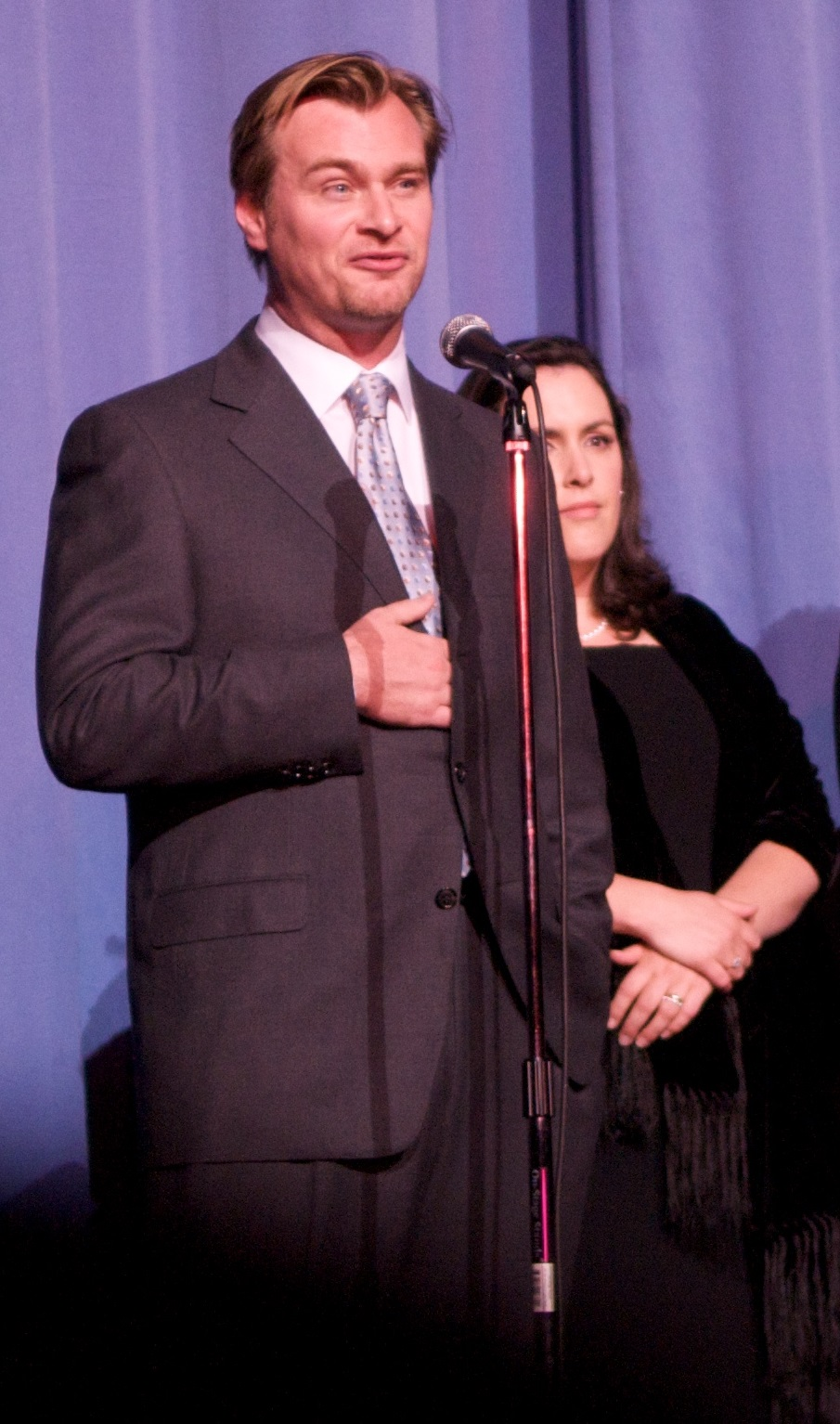
Christopher Nolan and his wife Emma Thomas at the 2008 London premiere of The Dark Knight

Christopher Nolan is a British and American filmmaker known for using aesthetics, themes and cinematic techniques that are recognisable in his work. Regarded as an auteur filmmaker, Nolan is partial to elliptical editing, documentary-style lighting, hand-held camera work, natural settings, and real filming locations over studio work. Embedded narratives and crosscutting between different time frames is a major component of his work, and his films often feature experimental soundscapes and mathematically-inspired images and concepts. Nolan prefers shooting on film to digital video and advocates for the use of higher-quality, larger-format film stock. He favours practical effects over computer-generated imagery, and is a proponent of theatrical exhibition, despite once humorously acknowledging "I'm as dependent on visual effects, probably more so than any other filmmaker out there." at the VES Awards in 2011.

His work explores existential and epistemological themes such as subjective experience, materialism, distortion of memory, human morality, the nature of time, causality, and the construction of personal identity. His characters are often emotionally disturbed, obsessive, or morally ambiguous, facing the fears and anxieties of loneliness, guilt, jealousy, and greed. Nolan uses his real-life experiences as an inspiration in his work. The most prominent recurring themes in his films include the concept of time and questions concerning the nature of existence and reality.

Nolan has co-written several of his films with his brother, Jonathan Nolan, and his wife, Emma Thomas, has co-produced all of his feature films. Other frequent collaborators include editor Lee Smith, cinematographers Wally Pfister and Hoyte van Hoytema, composers Hans Zimmer and Ludwig Göransson, sound designer Richard King, production designer Nathan Crowley, and casting director John Papsidera. Nolan's films feature many recurring actors, notably Michael Caine, who has appeared in eight.

== Aesthetics ==
=== Style ===
Regarded as an auteur and postmodernist, Nolan's visual style often emphasises urban settings, men in suits, muted colours, dialogue scenes framed in wide close-up with a shallow depth of field, inserts, and modern locations and architecture. Aesthetically, the director favours deep, evocative shadows, documentary-style lighting, hand-held camera work, natural settings, and real filming locations over studio work. His colour palettes have been influenced by his red-green colour blindness. Nolan has noted that many of his films are heavily influenced by film noir, and he is particularly known for exploring various ways of "manipulating story time and the viewer's experience of it." He has continuously experimented with metafictional elements, temporal shifts, elliptical cutting, solipsistic perspectives, nonlinear storytelling, labyrinthine plots, genre hybridity, and the merging of style and form.

Mazes, geometric shapes, impossible constructions, and paradoxes are prominently featured in Nolan's work. The Penrose stairs featured in Inception as an example of the impossible objects that can be created in lucid dream worlds.

Drawing attention to the intrinsically manipulative nature of the medium, Nolan uses narrative and stylistic techniques (notably mise en abyme and recursions) to stimulate the viewer to ask themselves why his films are put together the way they are and why they provoke particular responses. Nolan's preoccupation with recursive narratives and images first appear in his 1997 short film, Doodlebug, and can be seen in many of his features. Some examples include the infinity mirrors created by Ariadne in Inception, and Memento's poster design, inspired by the Droste effect, in which a picture appears within itself. His films often explore mathematically inspired ideas such as the Möbius strip, impossible objects, visual paradoxes and tessellations. He frequently uses these ideas as foundation for creating narrative form, such as the palindrome structure of Tenet. Notable examples of "mathematical beauty" in his work include the Penrose stairs in Inception, and the tesseract in Interstellar, "a three-dimensional representation of our four-dimensional reality (three physical dimensions plus time) inside the five-dimensional (four dimensions plus time) hyperspace". The logo for Nolan's production company, Syncopy, is a centreless maze.

A map showing the structure of Memento (2000)

Nolan sometimes uses editing as a way to represent the characters' psychological states, merging their subjectivity with that of the audience. For example, in Memento the fragmented sequential order of scenes is to put the audience into a similar experience of Leonard's defective ability to create new long-term memories. In The Prestige, the series of magic tricks and themes of duality and deception mirror the structural narrative of the film. His writing style incorporates a number of storytelling techniques such as flashbacks, shifting points of view, and unreliable narrators. Scenes are often interrupted by the unconventional editing style of cutting away quickly from the money shot (or nearly cutting off characters' dialogue) and crosscutting several scenes of parallel action to build to a climax.

Embedded narratives and crosscutting between different time frames is a major component of Nolan's auteurship. Following contains four timelines and intercuts three; Memento intercuts two timelines, with one moving backward; The Prestige contains four timelines and intercuts three; Inception intercuts four timelines, all of them framed by a fifth. In Dunkirk, Nolan structured three different timelines to emulate a Shepard tone in such a way that it "provides a continual feeling of intensity". Noted film theorist and historian David Bordwell wrote, "For Nolan, I think, form has centrally to do with the sorts of juxtapositions you can create by crosscutting. You could say he treats crosscutting the way Ophüls treats tracking shots or Dreyer treats stark decor: an initial commitment to a creative choice, which in turn shapes the handling of story, staging, performance and other factors." Bordwell further added, "It's rare to find any mainstream director so relentlessly focused on exploring a particular batch of storytelling techniques ... Nolan zeroes in, from film to film, on a few narrative devices, finding new possibilities in what most directors handle routinely. He seems to me a very thoughtful, almost theoretical director in his fascination with turning certain conventions this way and that, to reveal their unexpected possibilities." The director has also stressed the importance of establishing a clear point of view in his films, and makes frequent use of "the shot that walks into a room behind a character, because ... that takes [the viewer] inside the way that the character enters". On narrative perspective, Nolan has said, "You don't want to be hanging above the maze watching the characters make the wrong choices because it's frustrating. You actually want to be in the maze with them, making the turns at their side."

=== Music ===
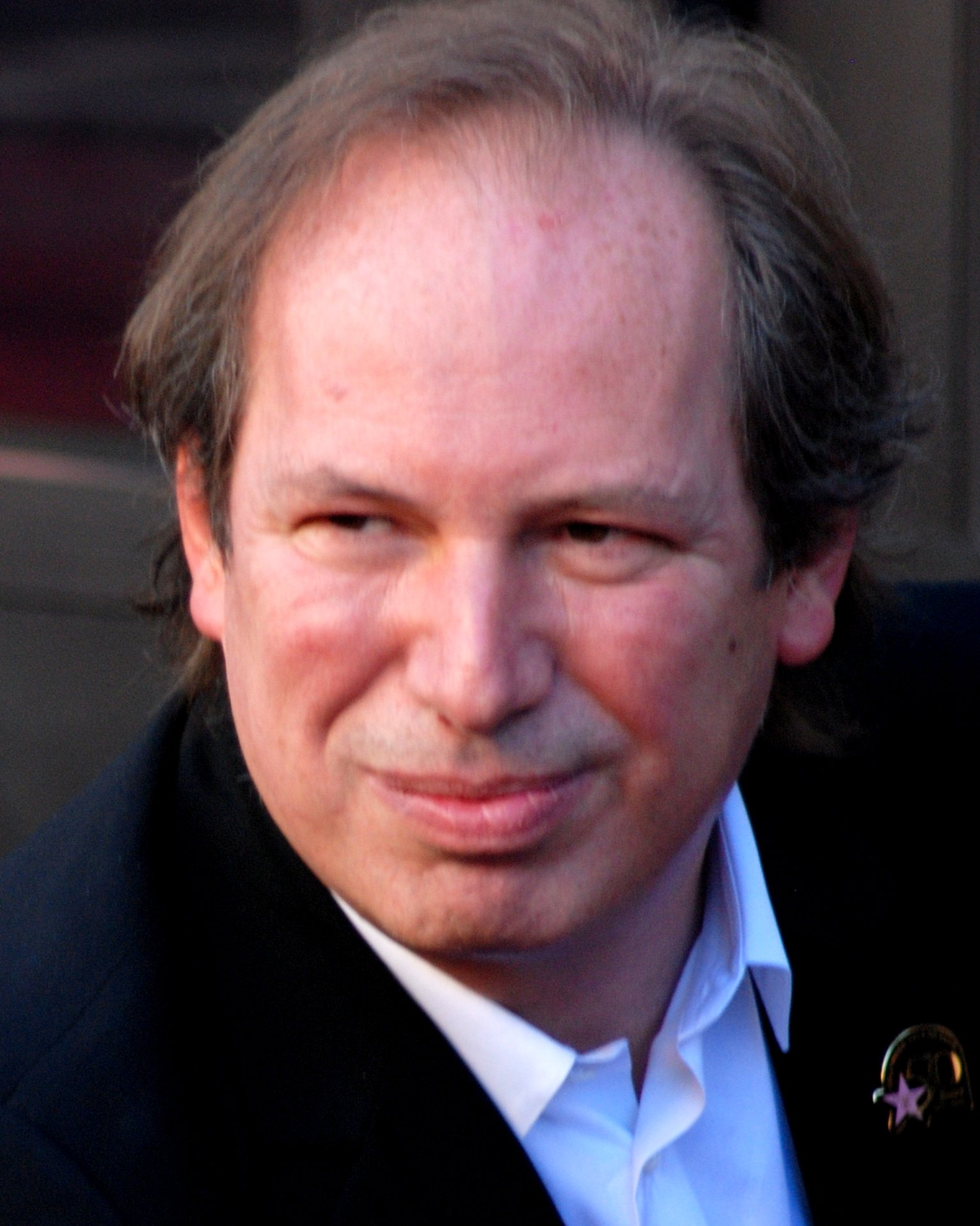
Nolan had frequently worked with Hans Zimmer to compose music for his productions.

In collaboration with composer David Julyan, Nolan's films feature slow and atmospheric scores with minimalistic expressions and ambient textures. In the mid-2000s, starting with Batman Begins (2005), Nolan began working with Hans Zimmer, who is known for integrating electronic music with traditional orchestral arrangements. With Zimmer, the soundscape in Nolan's films evolved into becoming increasingly more exuberant, kinetic and experimental. An example of this is the main theme from Inception (2010), which is derived from a slowed down version of Édith Piaf's song "Non, je ne regrette rien" (1960). For Interstellar (2014), Zimmer and Nolan wanted to move in a new direction: "The textures, the music, and the sounds, and the thing we sort of created has sort of seeped into other people's movies a bit, so it's time to reinvent." The score for Dunkirk (2017) was written to accommodate the auditory illusion of a Shepard tone. It was also based on a recording of Nolan's own pocket watch, which he sent to Zimmer to be synthesised. Ludwig Göransson, the composer for Tenet (2020), researched retrograde music to generate tunes that would sound the same forward and backward. Part of the soundscape for the villainous character in Tenet was based on Nolan breathing through a microphone, and later manipulated and turned into uncomfortable, raspy sounds by Göransson. He called working with the director an "eye-opening experience", saying: "I know from watching his films how savvy he is with music, how much he understands it, but I didn't fully know that he could speak about it almost like a trained musician."

Responding to criticism over his experimental sound mix for Interstellar, Nolan remarked: "I've always loved films that approach sound in an impressionistic way and that is an unusual approach for a mainstream blockbuster ... I don't agree with the idea that you can only achieve clarity through dialogue. Clarity of story, clarity of emotions — I try to achieve that in a very layered way using all the different things at my disposal — picture and sound." The mix for Tenet received similar attention, with some deeming it "infuriating", while others found it "inspiring". Peter Albrechtsen, a sound designer who worked on Dunkirk, commented that Nolan rarely uses ADR (Automated Dialogue Replacement), so the dialogue in his films are mostly based on production sound. He also noted that the way Nolan uses sound is "very visceral ... It is a physical experience. It's a very intense sonic experience, and I can see why, for some, that's quite overwhelming."

=== Themes ===
Nolan's work explores existential, ethical, and epistemological themes such as subjective experience, distortion of memory, human morality, the nature of time, causality, and construction of personal identity. On subjective point of view, Nolan said: "I'm fascinated by our subjective perception of reality, that we are all stuck in a very singular point of view, a singular perspective on what we all agree to be an objective reality, and movies are one of the ways in which we try to see things from the same point of view". His films contain a notable degree of ambiguity and often examine the similarities between filmmaking and architecture. The director avoids divulging the ambiguities of his work so that audiences can come up with their own interpretations.

He has completed eleven features, [...] all ticking the boxes of studio entertainment, yet indelibly marked with the kind of personal themes and obsessions that are more traditionally the preserve of the art house: the passage of time, the failures of memory, our quirks of denial and deflection, the intimate clockwork of our interior lives, set against landscapes in which the fault lines of late industrialism meet the fissure points and paradoxes of the information age.

— Tom Shone on Nolan being an auteur in Hollywood.

Film critic Tom Shone described Nolan's oeuvre as "epistemological thrillers whose protagonists, gripped by the desire for definitive answers, must negotiate mazy environments in which the truth is always beyond their reach." In an essay titled "The rational wonders of Christopher Nolan", film critic Mike D'Angelo argues that the filmmaker is a materialist dedicated to exploring the wonders of the natural world. "Underlying nearly every film he's ever made, no matter how fanciful, is his conviction that the universe can be explained entirely by physical processes." In his book, Out of Time: Desire in Atemporal Cinema, author and film theorist Todd McGowan claims that many of Nolan's films break from linear chronology in order to emphasize the repetition of "the psychoanalytic drive". He writes, "the future does not provide the promise of desire's realization but rather a repeated failure to attain its object. By scrambling chronology, atemporal films make evident this failure for the spectator and thus encourage the spectator to embrace the repetition of the drive rather than put their faith in a different future." In 2020, Richard Newby of The Hollywood Reporter wrote that Nolan's concept of "balancing scales" has become less focused on the individual and "more innately aware of the communal and global." He noted that the filmmaker is concerned with the notions of legacy and justice, as well as "the preservation of the future, ensuring that there is one for the next generations, even if that means sacrifice in the here and now."

Nolan often grounds his stories in broader societal issues, such as corruption, surveillance, economic inequality and climate change, and his characters are usually emotionally disturbed, obsessive, and morally ambiguous, facing the fears and anxieties of loneliness, guilt, jealousy, and greed. By exploring "everyday neurosis – our everyday sort of fears and hopes for ourselves" in a heightened reality, Nolan makes them more accessible to a universal audience. The protagonists of Nolan's films are often driven by philosophical beliefs, and their fate is ambiguous. In some of his films, the protagonist and antagonist are mirror images of each other, a point which is made to the protagonist by the antagonist. Through the clashing of ideologies, Nolan highlights the ambivalent nature of truth. In his book, The Traumatic Screen: The Films of Christopher Nolan (2020), film scholar Stuart Joy builds on contemporary psychoanalytic film theory to consider "the function and presentation of trauma" across Nolan's work, arguing that the complexity, thematic consistency, and fragmentary nature of his films mimic the structural operation of trauma. He writes that, "Nolan's films highlight cinema's ability to probe the nature of human consciousness while commenting on the relationship between spectator and screen."

The director uses his real-life experiences as an inspiration in his work, saying, "From a creative point of view, the process of growing up, the process of maturing, getting married, having kids, I've tried to use that in my work. I've tried to just always be driven by the things that were important to me." Writing for The Playlist, Oliver Lyttelton singled out parenthood as a signature theme in Nolan's work, adding: "[T]he director avoids talking about his private life, but fatherhood has been at the emotional heart of almost everything he's made, at least from Batman Begins onwards (previous films, it should be said, pre-dated the birth of his kids)."

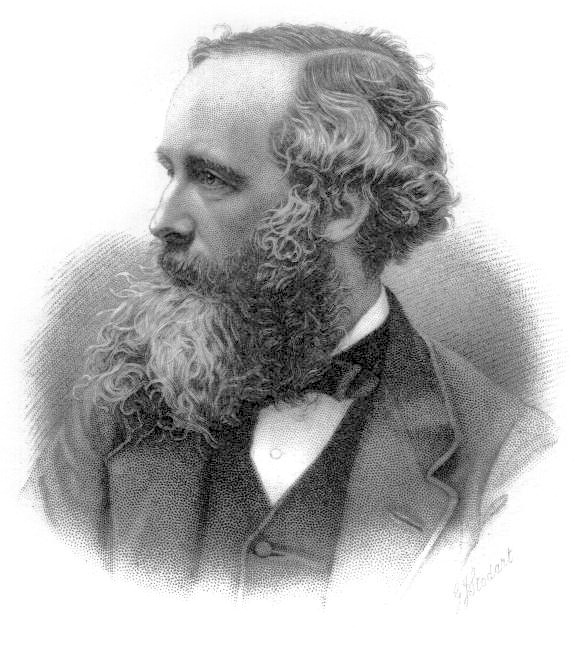
Time is a recurring theme in Nolan's work. Many ideas in Tenet were first explored in a thought experiment by James Clerk Maxwell in 1867, in which he suggested how the second law of thermodynamics might hypothetically be violated.

Nolan's most prominent recurring theme is the concept of time. The director has identified that all of his films "have had some odd relationship with time, usually in just a structural sense, in that I have always been interested in the subjectivity of time." Writing for Film Philosophy, Emma Bell commented that the characters in Inception "escape time by being stricken in it – building the delusion that time has not passed, and is not passing now. They feel time grievously: willingly and knowingly destroying their experience by creating multiple simultaneous existences." In Interstellar, Nolan explored the laws of physics as represented in Einstein's theory of general relativity, identifying time as the film's antagonist. With Tenet, Nolan used entropy and the second law of thermodynamics to explore temporal paradoxes such as the grandfather paradox and the causal loop, as well as ideas about retrocausality, fatalism, infinity, the one-electron universe, and Maxwell's demon. Siddhant Adlakha of IGN called Tenet a culmination of the director's career and his obsession with "time as a moving fabric imprinted on film." Brandon Katz of The Observer wrote that "time isn't just a narrative gimmick in Nolan's filmography nor are his settings mere window dressing for the action. Instead, they are integral elements of the story that interact with both the characters and the viewers to elicit an emotional and psychological response both consciously and subconsciously."

Ontological questions concerning the nature of existence and reality also play a major role in his body of work. Alec Price and M. Dawson of Left Field Cinema noted that the existential crisis of conflicted male figures "struggling with the slippery nature of identity" is a prevalent theme in Nolan's films. The actual (or objective) world is of less importance than the way in which we absorb and remember, and it is this created (or subjective) reality that truly matters. "It is solely in the mind and the heart where any sense of permanency or equilibrium can ever be found." According to Todd McGowan, these "created realities" also reveal the ethical and political importance of creating fictions and falsehoods. Nolan's films typically deceive spectators about the events that occur and the motivations of the characters, but they do not abandon the idea of truth altogether. Instead, "They show us how truth must emerge out of the lie if it is not to lead us entirely astray." McGowan further argues that Nolan is the first filmmaker to devote himself entirely to the illusion of the medium, calling him a Hegelian filmmaker.

In Inception, Nolan was inspired by lucid dreaming and dream incubation. The film's characters try to embed an idea in a person's mind without their knowledge, similar to Freud's theory that the unconscious influences one's behaviour without one's knowledge. Most of the film takes place in interconnected dream worlds; this creates a framework where actions in the real (or dream) worlds ripple across others. The dream is always in a state of emergence, shifting across levels as the characters navigate it. Like Memento and The Prestige, Inception uses metaleptic storytelling devices and follows Nolan's "auteur affinity of converting, moreover, converging narrative and cognitive values into and within a fictional story".

Home is a recurring theme in Nolan’s films: After Bruce Wayne completes his training abroad in Batman Begins, he returns to Gotham City to fight crime; in Inception, Dom Cobb takes the mission solely so he can return to the U.S. to be at home with his children; in The Dark Knight Rises, the underground prison for the diabolical Bane represents both hell and home; in Interstellar, the astronauts set out to find a new home for humanity as Earth becomes uninhabitable; in Oppenheimer, the German Einstein advises the title character to fight against authoritarian tendencies in his homeland;. The Odyssey follows Odysseus as he attempts to return home.

==== Interpretation ====
Literary researcher Konrad Kirsch views humanity’s self-destruction as the central theme of Christopher Nolan’s cinematic work. This is depicted in Nolan’s early short film Doodlebug, in which a man steps on a small creature that turns out to be a miniature version of himself. At the end of the film, as a mise en abyme, he is trampled to death by his own larger version.

According to Kirsch, Nolan translates the self-destruction of humanity depicted in Doodlebug into a formula akin to a magic trick involving supposed teleportation as depicted in The Prestige: corresponding to the various versions of the man in Doodlebug, a magician character creates copies of himself, one of which survives while the other is murdered. According to Kirsch, this concept shapes all of Christopher Nolan’s subsequent films, with frequent allusions to magic tricks throughout his filmography; in Inception, Dom Cobb claims to "know the tricks", while in The Dark Night, the Joker uses the term "magic trick" before murdering a mobster. The recurruing motif of the bird – or the airplane, as a steel version of a bird – alludes to the canaries in The Prestige and thus also to the script of the magic tricks. Since Interstellar, Nolan has drawn a parallel between humanity’s self-destruction and the climate apocalypse. In Tenet, for example, the future is waging war against the present, since the present, through his actions, is robbing future humanity of the means to survive. The reversal of time is the "trick", as the so-called "turnstiles" that bring this about represent the magical apparatus. In Oppenheimer, the title character represents the inventor. The atomic bomb is a lethal device created in an almost magical way through quantum physics. Because Oppenheimer is aware of the deadly consequences of his invention, he tries to prevent its use. Just as in The Prestige the performance of the "trick" represents Angier’s serial murder of his doppelgänger, and just as in Tenet the activation of the "algorithm" would wipe out the entire world, in Oppenheimer there is a danger that the detonation of the atomic bomb would trigger a chain reaction that would destroy the world.

==== Commentary ====
Nolan's work has often been the subject of extensive social and political commentary. Slovenian philosopher Slavoj Žižek said Nolan's The Dark Knight Rises shows that Hollywood blockbusters can be "precise indicators of the ideological predicaments of our societies". The Dark Knight trilogy explored themes of chaos, terrorism, escalation of violence, financial manipulation, utilitarianism, mass surveillance, and class conflict. Batman's arc of rising (philosophically) from a man to "more than just a man" is similar to the Nietzschian Übermensch. The films also explore ideas akin to Jean-Jacques Rousseau's philosophical glorification of a simpler, more primitive way of life and the concept of general will. Theorist Douglas Kellner saw the series as a critical allegory about the Bush–Cheney era, highlighting the theme of government corruption and failure to solve social problems, as well as the cinematic spectacle and iconography related to 9/11.

In 2018, the conservative magazine The American Spectator published an article, "In Search of Christopher Nolan", writing, "All of Nolan's films, while maintaining a strong patriotism, plunges below the surface into the murky waters of philosophy, probing some of the deepest human struggles in our unfortunately postmodern age." The article further argues that Dunkirk echoes the work of absurdist playwrights like Samuel Beckett and the bleak, existential novels of Albert Camus and Jean-Paul Sartre. Nolan has said that none of his films are intended to be political.

== Method ==
Films are subjective – what you like, what you don't like, but the thing for me that is absolutely unifying is the idea that every time I go to the cinema and pay my money and sit down and watch a film go up onscreen, I want to feel that the people who made that film think it's the best movie in the world, that they poured everything into it and they really love it. Whether or not I agree with what they've done, I want that effort there – I want that sincerity. And when you don't feel it, that's the only time I feel like I'm wasting my time at the movies.

— Nolan, on sincerity and ambition in filmmaking.

Nolan has described his filmmaking process as a combination of intuition and geometry. "I draw a lot of diagrams when I work. I do a lot of thinking about etchings by Escher, for instance. That frees me, finding a mathematical model or a scientific model. I'll draw pictures and diagrams that illustrate the movement or the rhythm that I'm after." Caltech physicist and Nobel Laureate Kip Thorne compared Nolan's intuition to forward-thinking scientists, saying the filmmaker intuitively grasped things non-scientists rarely understand. Regarding his own decision-making of whether to start work on a project, Nolan has proclaimed a belief in the sincerity of his passion for something within the particular project in question as a basis for his selective thought.

When working with actors, Nolan prefers giving them the time to perform as many takes of a given scene as they want. "I've come to realize that the lighting and camera setups, the technical things, take all the time, but running another take generally only adds a couple of minutes ... If an actor tells me they can do something more with a scene, I give them the chance, because it's not going to cost that much time. It can't all be about the technical issues." He prohibits the use of phones on set, and favours working in close coordination with his actors, avoiding the use of a video village. Cillian Murphy said, "he creates this environment where it's just you and the actor or actors, there's Wally [Pfister], the camera man, and he stands beside the camera with like his little monitor but he's watching it in real time. And for him the performance is paramount. It's the connection between the actors. He allows room for spontaneity." Gary Oldman praised the director for giving the actors space to "find things in the scene" and not just give direction for direction's sake. Kenneth Branagh also recognised Nolan's ability to provide a harmonious work environment, comparing him with Danny Boyle and Robert Altman: "These are not people who try to trick or cajole or hector people. They sort of strip away the chaos."

Nolan chooses to minimise the amount of computer-generated imagery for special effects in his films, preferring to use practical effects whenever possible, and only using CGI to enhance elements which he has photographed in camera. For instance, his films Batman Begins, Inception, and Interstellar featured 620, 500, and 850 visual-effects shots, respectively, which is considered minor when compared with contemporary visual-effects epics, which may have upwards of 1,500 to 2,000 VFX shots. Nolan explained:

I believe in an absolute difference between animation and photography. However sophisticated your computer-generated imagery is, if it's been created from no physical elements and you haven't shot anything, it's going to feel like animation. There are usually two different goals in a visual effects movie. One is to fool the audience into seeing something seamless, and that's how I try to use it. The other is to impress the audience with the amount of money spent on the spectacle of the visual effect, and that, I have no interest in.

Nolan shoots the entirety of his films with one unit, rather than using a second unit for action sequences. That way, he keeps his personality and point of view in every aspect of the film. "If I don't need to be directing the shots that go in the movie, why do I need to be there at all? The screen is the same size for every shot ... Many action films embrace a second unit taking on all of the action. For me, that's odd because then why did you want to do an action film?" He uses multi-camera for stunts and single-camera for all the dramatic action. He then watches dailies every night, saying, "Shooting single-camera means I've already seen every frame as it's gone through the gate because my attention isn't divided to multi-cameras." Nolan deliberately works under a tight schedule during the early stages of the editing process, forcing himself and his editor to work more spontaneously. "I always think of editing as instinctive or impressionist. Not to think too much, in a way, and feel it more." He also avoids using temp music while cutting his films.

== Frequent collaborators ==
Nolan's wife, Emma Thomas, has co-produced all of his films (including Memento, in which she is credited as an associate producer). He regularly works with his brother, Jonathan Nolan (creator of Person of Interest and Westworld), who describes their working relationship in the production notes for The Prestige: "I've always suspected that it has something to do with the fact that he's left-handed and I'm right-handed, because he's somehow able to look at my ideas and flip them around in a way that's just a little bit more twisted and interesting. It's great to be able to work with him like that". When working on separate projects the brothers always consult each other.

As a director, I'm sort of a human lens through which everyone's efforts are focused. A big part of my job is making decisions about how all the great talent that I'm working with blends into a single consciousness

— Nolan on collaboration and leadership.

The director has worked with screenwriter David S. Goyer on all of his comic-book adaptations. Wally Pfister was the cinematographer for all of Nolan's films from Memento to The Dark Knight Rises. Embarking on his own career as a director, Pfister said: "The greatest lesson I learned from Chris Nolan is to keep my humility. He is an absolute gentleman on set and he is wonderful to everyone – from the actors to the entire crew, he treats everyone with respect." With Interstellar Nolan began collaborating with cinematographer Hoyte van Hoytema.

Lee Smith has edited seven of Nolan's films, Dody Dorn has edited two, and Jennifer Lame has cut three. David Julyan composed the music for Nolan's early work, while Hans Zimmer and James Newton Howard provided the music for Batman Begins and The Dark Knight. Zimmer scored The Dark Knight Rises and worked with Nolan on many of his subsequent films. Zimmer said his creative relationship with Nolan was highly collaborative, and that he considers Nolan a "co-creator" of the music. Since 2020's Tenet, Nolan has worked with Ludwig Göransson. The director has worked with sound designer Richard King and re-recording mixer Gary Rizzo since The Prestige. Nolan has frequently collaborated with special-effects supervisor Chris Corbould, stunt coordinator Tom Struthers first assistant director Nilo Otero, and visual effects supervisor Paul Franklin. Otero regards Nolan as a throwback to old-school Hollywood directors for his proficiency in all aspects of production instead of specializing. Production designer Nathan Crowley has worked with him since Insomnia (except for Inception and Oppenheimer). Nolan has called Crowley one of his closest and most inspiring creative collaborators. Casting director John Papsidera has worked on all of Nolan's films, except Following and Insomnia.

Christian Bale, Michael Caine, Gary Oldman, Cillian Murphy, Tom Hardy, Anne Hathaway, Matt Damon, Josh Stewart, Morgan Freeman, Jack Cutmore-Scott, Sean Avery and Kenneth Branagh have been frequent collaborators from the mid-2000s to the mid-2020s, each appearing in upwards of 3 films. Caine is Nolan's most prolific collaborator, having appeared in eight of his films (including a cameo in Dunkirk); Nolan regards him as his "good luck charm". In return, Caine has described Nolan as "one of cinema's greatest directors", comparing him favourably with the likes of David Lean, John Huston, and Joseph L. Mankiewicz. Nolan is known for casting stars from the 1980s in his films, i.e. Rutger Hauer (Batman Begins), Eric Roberts (The Dark Knight), Tom Berenger (Inception), Matthew Modine (The Dark Knight Rises and Oppenheimer), Anthony Michael Hall (The Dark Knight), and John Lithgow (Interstellar). Modine said of working with Nolan, "There are no chairs on a Nolan set, he gets out of his car and goes to the set. And he stands up until lunchtime. And then he stands up until they say 'Wrap'. He's fully engaged – in every aspect of the film."

Collaborator	Role	Following	Memento	Insomnia	Batman Begins	The Prestige	The Dark Knight	Inception	The Dark Knight Rises	Interstellar	Dunkirk	Tenet	Oppenheimer	The Odyssey	Total
Casey Affleck	Actor									Yes			Yes		2
Christian Bale	Actor				Yes	Yes	Yes		Yes						4
Kenneth Branagh	Actor										Yes	Yes	Yes		3
Michael Caine	Actor				Yes	Yes	Yes	Yes	Yes	Yes	Yes	Yes			8
Tom Conti	Actor								Yes				Yes		2
Ken Watanabe	Actor				Yes			Yes							2
Marion Cotillard	Actor							Yes	Yes						2
Matthew Modine	Actor								Yes				Yes		2
Andrew Pleavin	Actor				Yes			Yes							2
Colin McFarlane	Actor				Yes		Yes								2
Martin Donovan	Actor			Yes								Yes			2
Dody Dorn	Editor		Yes	Yes											2
Nicky Katt	Actor			Yes			Yes								2
Mark Boone Junior	Actor		Yes		Yes										2
David Dastmalchian	Actor						Yes						Yes		2
Néstor Carbonell	Actor						Yes		Yes						2
Keith Szarabajka	Actor						Yes		Yes						2
Thomas Lennon	Actor		Yes						Yes						2
Liam Neeson	Actor				Yes				Yes						2
Chris Corbould	Visual effects supervisor				Yes		Yes	Yes	Yes						4
Nathan Crowley	Production designer			Yes	Yes	Yes	Yes		Yes	Yes	Yes	Yes			8
Larry Dias	Set decorator							Yes						Yes	2
Ruth De Jong	Production design												Yes	Yes	2
Gary Fettis	Set decorator									Yes	Yes				2
Scott Fisher	Visual effects supervisor							Yes	Yes	Yes	Yes	Yes	Yes	Yes	7
Paul Franklin	Visual effects supervisor				Yes		Yes	Yes	Yes	Yes					5
Morgan Freeman	Actor				Yes		Yes		Yes						3
Jamie Harris	Actor					Yes								Yes	2
Ludwig Göransson	Composer											Yes	Yes	Yes	3
Joseph Gordon-Levitt	Actor							Yes	Yes						2
Bill Irwin	Actor									Yes				Yes	2
James Newton Howard	Composer				Yes		Yes								2
Andrew Jackson	Visual effects supervisor										Yes	Yes	Yes	Yes	4
Jennifer Lame	Editor											Yes	Yes	Yes	3
Ellen Mirojnick	Costume design												Yes	Yes	2
Tom Hardy	Actor							Yes	Yes		Yes				3
Lindy Hemming	Costume designer				Yes		Yes		Yes						3
David Julyan	Composer	Yes	Yes	Yes		Yes									4
Richard King	Sound designer					Yes	Yes	Yes	Yes	Yes	Yes	Yes	Yes		8
Jeffrey Kurland	Costumer designer							Yes			Yes	Yes			3
Cillian Murphy	Actor				Yes		Yes	Yes	Yes		Yes		Yes		6
John Nolan	Actor	Yes			Yes				Yes		Yes				4
Jonathan Nolan	Screenwriter		Yes			Yes	Yes		Yes	Yes					5
Gary Oldman	Actor				Yes		Yes		Yes				Yes		4
Anne Hathaway	Actor								Yes	Yes				Yes	3
Matt Damon	Actor									Yes			Yes	Yes	3
Elliot Page	Actor							Yes						Yes	2
Robert Pattinson	Actor											Yes		Yes	2
Himesh Patel	Actor											Yes		Yes	2
John Papsidera	Casting director		Yes		Yes	Yes	Yes	Yes	Yes	Yes	Yes	Yes	Yes	Yes	11
Wally Pfister	Cinematographer		Yes	Yes	Yes	Yes	Yes	Yes	Yes						7
Elyes Gabel	Actor									Yes				Yes	2
James Remar	Actor												Yes	Yes	2
Gary Rizzo	Sound mixer					Yes	Yes	Yes	Yes	Yes	Yes	Yes	Yes	Yes	9
Charles Roven	Producer				Yes		Yes		Yes				Yes		4
Benny Safdie	Actor												Yes	Yes	2
Lee Smith	Editor				Yes	Yes	Yes	Yes	Yes	Yes	Yes				7
Josh Stewart	Actor								Yes	Yes		Yes		Yes	4
Jeremy Theobald	Actor	Yes			Yes							Yes			3
Emma Thomas	Producer	Yes	Yes	Yes	Yes	Yes	Yes	Yes	Yes	Yes	Yes	Yes	Yes	Yes	13
Hoyte van Hoytema	Cinematographer									Yes	Yes	Yes	Yes	Yes	5
Hans Zimmer	Composer				Yes		Yes	Yes	Yes	Yes	Yes				6
James D'Arcy	Actor										Yes		Yes		2
Jefferson Hall	Actor											Yes	Yes		2
Sean Avery	Actor											Yes	Yes	Yes	3
Jack Cutmore-Scott	Actor										Yes	Yes	Yes		3
Anthony Molinari	Actor											Yes		Yes	2
Jimmy Star	Actor				Yes							Yes			2
Andrew Howard	Actor											Yes		Yes	2
Brian Vernel	Actor										Yes			Yes	2

== Influences ==
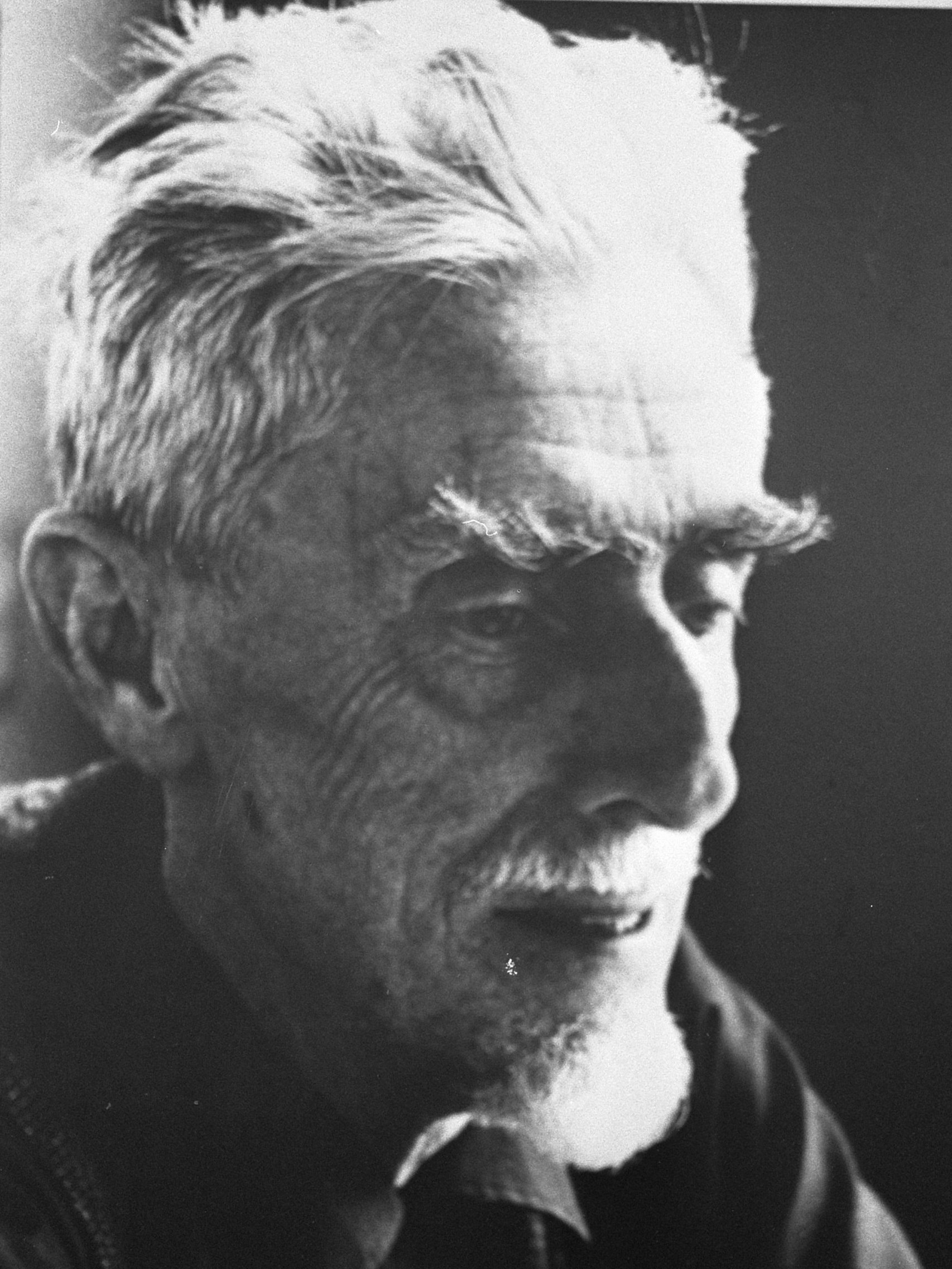
Nolan has credited M. C. Escher as a major influence.

The filmmaker has often cited Dutch graphic artist M. C. Escher as a major influence on his own work. "I'm very inspired by the prints of M. C. Escher and the interesting connection-point or blurring of boundaries between art and science, and art and mathematics." Another source of inspiration is Argentine writer Jorge Luis Borges. The director has called Memento a "strange cousin" to Funes the Memorious, and has said, "I think his writing naturally lends itself to a cinematic interpretation because it is all about efficiency and precision, the bare bones of an idea."

Filmmakers Nolan has cited as influences include: Stanley Kubrick, Brothers Quay, Michael Mann, Terrence Malick, Orson Welles, Fritz Lang, Nicolas Roeg, Sidney Lumet, David Lean, Ridley Scott, Tony Scott, Terry Gilliam, John Frankenheimer, Hugh Hudson, Adrian Lyne, Alan Parker, Sergio Leone, Andrei Tarkovsky, David Lynch and Jacques Tourneur. Nolan's personal favourite films include Blade Runner (1982), Star Wars (1977), The Man Who Would Be King (1975), Lawrence of Arabia (1962), Chinatown (1974), 2001: A Space Odyssey (1968), Withnail and I (1987), and Chariots of Fire (1981). In 2013 Criterion Collection released a list of Nolan's ten favourite films from its catalogue, which included The Hit (1984), 12 Angry Men (1957), The Thin Red Line (1998), The Testament of Dr. Mabuse (1933), Bad Timing (1980), Merry Christmas Mr. Lawrence (1983), For All Mankind (1989), Koyaanisqatsi (1982), Mr. Arkadin (1955), and Erich von Stroheim's Greed (1924) (unavailable on Criterion). He is also a fan of the James Bond films, citing them as a "a huge source of inspiration" and has expressed his admiration for the work of composer John Barry.

Nolan's habit of employing non-linear storylines was particularly influenced by the Graham Swift novel Waterland, which he felt "did incredible things with parallel timelines, and told a story in different dimensions that was extremely coherent". He was also influenced by the visual language of the film Pink Floyd – The Wall (1982) and the structure of Pulp Fiction (1994), stating that he was "fascinated with what Tarantino had done". Inception was partly influenced by Dante's Inferno, Max Ernst's Forest series, and the films The Matrix (1999), Tarkovsky's Solaris (1972), On Her Majesty's Secret Service (1969), and Zabriskie Point (1970). For Interstellar, he mentioned a number of literary influences, including Flatland by Edwin Abbott Abbott, The Wasp Factory by Iain Banks, and A Wrinkle in Time by Madeleine L'Engle. For Dunkirk, Nolan said he was inspired by the work of Robert Bresson, silent films such as Intolerance (1916) and Sunrise: A Song of Two Humans (1927), as well as by The Wages of Fear (1953). Other influences Nolan has credited include figurative painter Francis Bacon, architects Frank Lloyd Wright, Walter Gropius, Ludwig Mies van der Rohe, poet T. S. Eliot (Four Quartets, in particular), and authors Raymond Chandler (The Big Sleep influenced Nolan's first films), James Ellroy, Jim Thompson, and Charles Dickens (A Tale of Two Cities was a major influence on The Dark Knight Rises).

Nolan has also praised the comedies Talladega Nights, MacGruber, and The Curse (2023), as well as the blockbusters Watchmen (2009) and the Fast & Furious franchise specially Tokyo Drift.

In 2025, Nolan and Christopher Frayling collaborated on the radio series Hollywood And The Adland Five for BBC Radio 4. It examines the influence of British filmmakers Hugh Hudson, Adrian Lyne, Alan Parker, and Ridley and Tony Scott, with the aim of "assessing the impact of one of the most significant, audacious - and least recognized - periods in the history of filmmaking."

== Views on the film industry ==
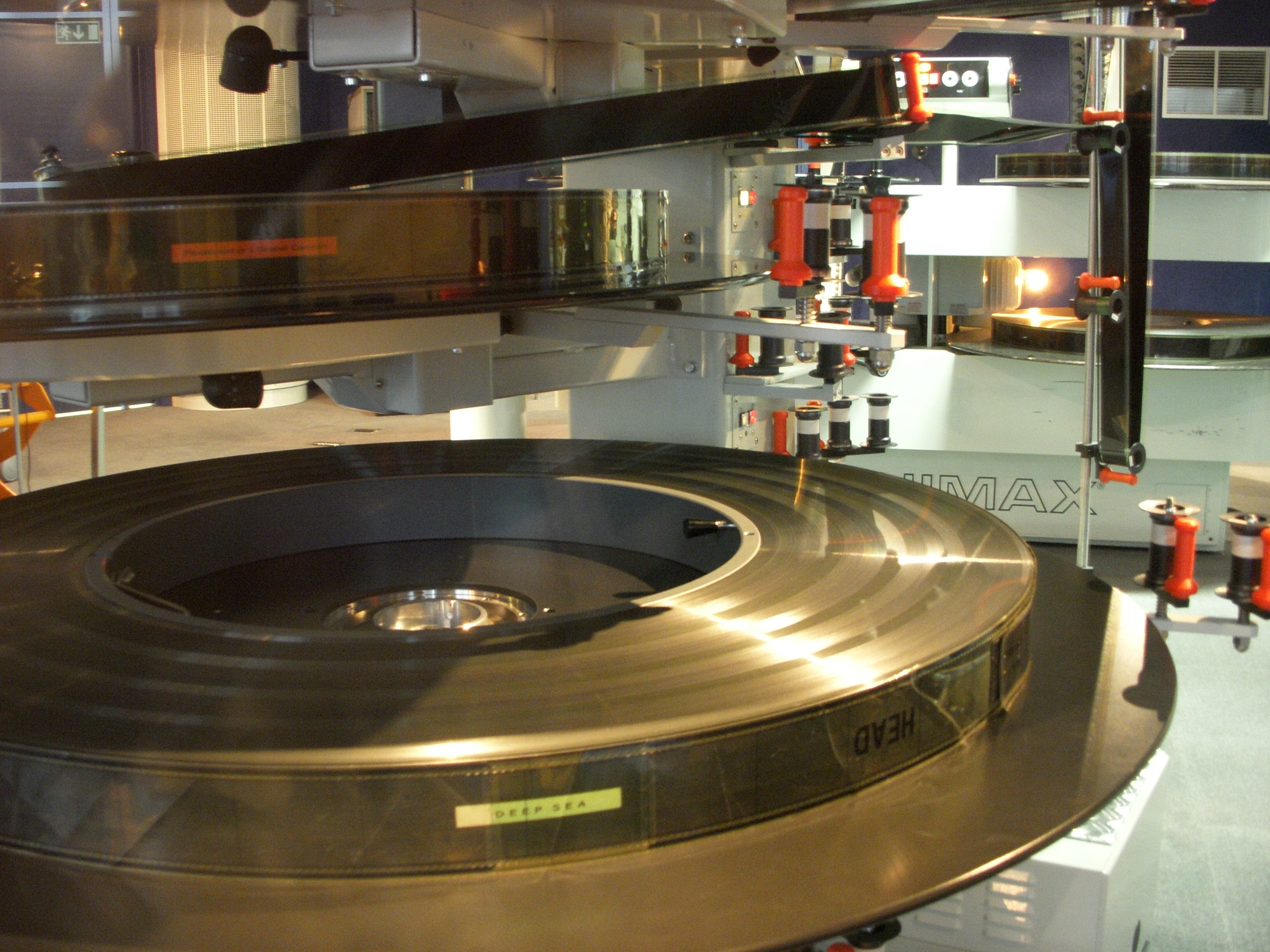
Nolan is known for shooting on 70 mm film, and is credited for popularising the use of IMAX 70mm cameras in contemporary cinema.

=== Photographic film ===
Nolan is a vocal proponent of the continued use of film stock and prefers it over digital recording and projection formats, summing up his belief as, "I am not committed to film out of nostalgia. I am in favor of any kind of technical innovation but it needs to exceed what has gone before and so far nothing has exceeded anything that's come before". Nolan's major concern is that the film industry's adoption of digital formats has been driven purely by economic factors as opposed to digital being a superior medium to film, saying, "I think, truthfully, it boils down to the economic interest of manufacturers and [a production] industry that makes more money through change rather than through maintaining the status quo." He opposes the use of digital intermediates and digital cinematography, which he feels are less reliable than film and offer inferior image quality. In particular, the director advocates for the use of higher-quality, larger-format film stock such as Panavision anamorphic 35mm, VistaVision, Panavision Super 70mm, and IMAX 70mm film. Rather than use a digital intermediate, Nolan uses photochemical colour timing to colour grade his films, which results in less manipulation of the filmed image and higher film resolution. Seeking to maintain high resolution from an analogue workflow, Nolan has at times edited and created release prints for his films optically rather than though digital processes. On occasion he has even edited sequences for his films from the original camera negative. When digital processes are used, Nolan will use high resolution telecine based on a photochemical film print, striving to maintain a "film look".

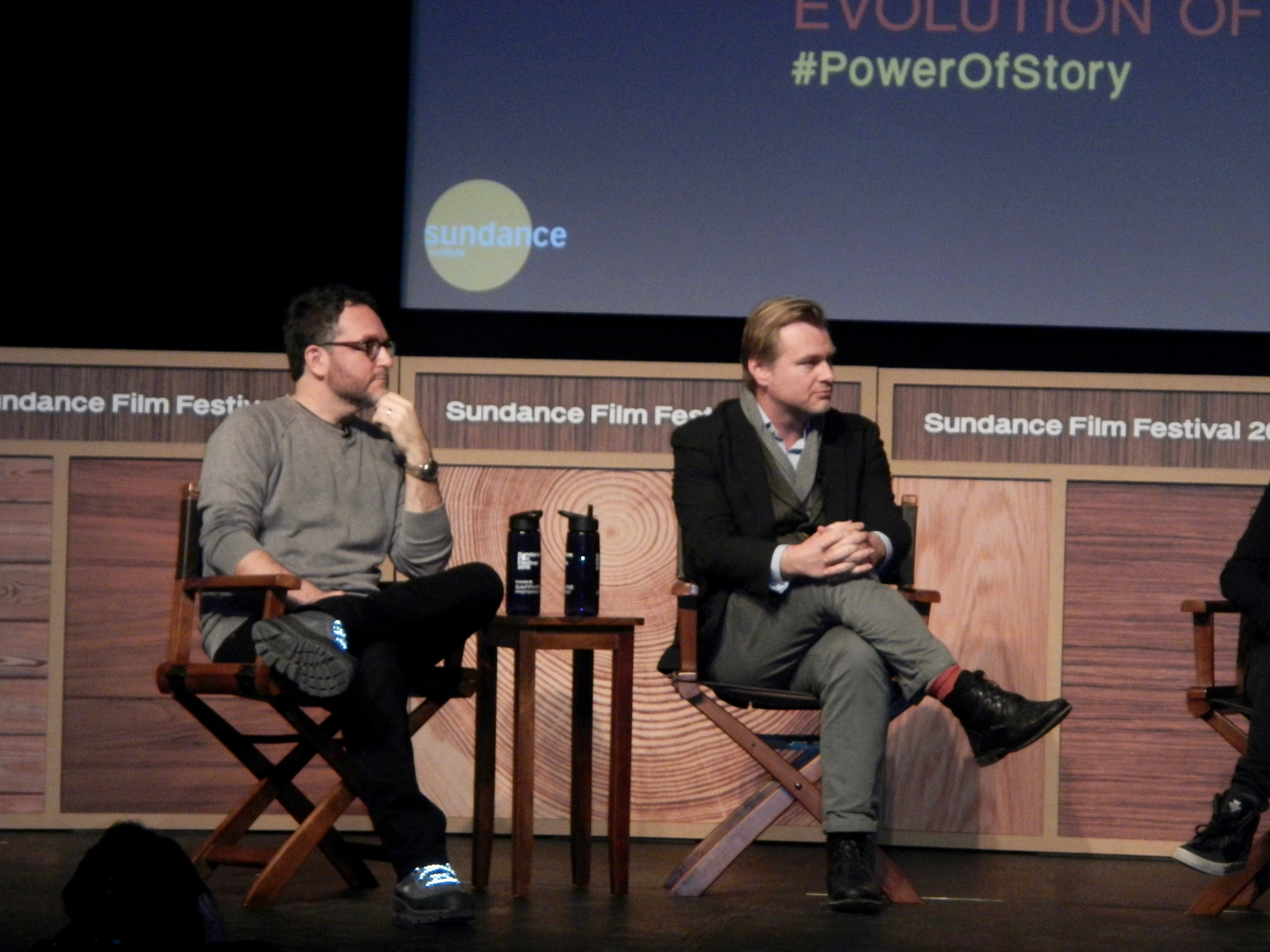
Nolan (right) and director Colin Trevorrow discussing the importance of film at the 2016 Sundance Film Festival

Nolan is credited for popularising the use of IMAX film cameras in commercial filmmaking, and has used his influence in Hollywood to showcase the IMAX format, warning other filmmakers that unless they continued to assert their choice to use film in their productions, movie studios would begin to phase out the use of film in favour of digital. In 2014, Nolan, along with directors J. J. Abrams, Quentin Tarantino and Judd Apatow, successfully lobbied for major Hollywood studios to continue to fund Kodak to produce and process film stock, following the company's emergence from Chapter 11 bankruptcy, as Kodak is currently the last remaining manufacturer of motion picture film stock worldwide. At the 2016 Sundance Film Festival, Nolan attended a panel entitled "Power of Story", where he discussed the importance of allowing filmmakers the continued artistic choice of shooting on film. Nolan argued for the artistic merits of film on the grounds of "medium specificity", which highlights the importance that a work shot on film be presented in its original format, and "medium resistance", that the artist's choice of what medium is used to create a work will further effect choices in how a work is made. Nolan is also a proponent of film preservation and is a member of the National Film Preservation Board, as well as the board of Martin Scorsese's non-profit organisation The Film Foundation.

=== Theatrical exhibition ===
Nolan is an advocate for the importance of films being shown in large-screen cinema theatres as opposed to home video formats, as he believes that, "The theatrical window is to the movie business what live concerts are to the music business – and no one goes to a concert to be played an MP3 on a bare stage." In 2014, Nolan wrote an article for The Wall Street Journal where he expressed concern that as the film industry transitions away from photochemical film towards digital formats, the difference between seeing films in theatres versus on other formats will become trivialised, leaving audiences no incentive to seek out a theatrical experience. Nolan further expressed concern that with content digitised, theatres of the future will be able to track best-selling films and adjust their programming accordingly, a process that favours large heavily marketed studio films, but will marginalise smaller innovative and unconventional pictures. To combat this, Nolan believes the industry needs to focus on improving the theatrical experience with bigger and more beautiful presentation formats that cannot be accessed or reproduced in the home, as well as embracing the new generation of aspiring young innovative filmmakers. Nolan assisted in the 2019 renovation of the DGA theatre in Los Angeles.

During the COVID-19 pandemic, Nolan emerged as "a fierce advocate" for movie theaters and film industry workers. He wrote about the social and cultural importance of movie theaters in an article published by The Washington Post on 21 March 2020. He described cinemas as "the most affordable and democratic of our community gathering places" and urged the United States Congress to include struggling theater chains and their employees in the federal bailout. "I hope that people are seeing our exhibition community for what it really is: a vital part of social life, providing jobs for many and entertainment for all. These are places of joyful mingling where workers serve up stories and treats to the crowds that come to enjoy an evening out with friends and family. As a filmmaker, my work can never be complete without those workers and the audiences they welcome." On 30 September 2020, he signed a letter to Washington lawmakers calling on the federal government to provide support for the industry. On 18 January 2021, he signed his name to a petition calling for the UK Chancellor, Rishi Sunak, to provide funding for struggling movie theaters. Owen Gleiberman of Variety deemed Nolan "the film industry's most dynamic public advocate for the movie-theater experience."

Nolan, whose relationship with Warner Bros. has been described as "one of the most successful working relationships in modern show business history", publicly criticised the studio for their lack of transparency when they announced they would release their 2021 theatrical slate day-and-date on HBO Max. In an interview with NPR, he explained: "When a company starts devaluing the individual assets by using them as leverage for a different business strategy without first figuring out how those new structures are going to have to work, it's a sign of great danger for the ordinary people who work in this industry."

=== 3D and home video media ===
Nolan has been critical of 3D film and dislikes that 3D cameras cannot be equipped with prime (non-zoom) lenses. In particular, Nolan has criticised the loss of brightness caused by 3D projection, which can be up to three foot-lamberts dimmer than the industry standard off 16 foot-lamberts. "You're not that aware of it because once you're 'in that world,' your eye compensates, but having struggled for years to get theaters up to the proper brightness, we're not sticking polarized filters in everything." Nolan has also argued against the notion that traditional film does not create the illusion of depth perception, saying, "I think it's a misnomer to call it 3D versus 2D. The whole point of cinematic imagery is it's three dimensional ... You know 95% of our depth cues come from occlusion, resolution, color and so forth, so the idea of calling a 2D movie a '2D movie' is a little misleading."

He also opposes motion interpolation, commonly referred to as the "soap opera effect", as the default setting on television. In 2018, Nolan, Paul Thomas Anderson and other filmmakers reached out to television manufacturers in an attempt to "try and give directors a voice in how the technical standards of our work can be maintained in the home." A TV setting called "Filmmaker Mode" was announced by UHD Alliance a year later.

Nolan also advocates physical media for home video over streaming media, particularly Ultra HD Blu-ray, citing the superior image quality which more closely preserves the filmmakers vision. Says Nolan, “There’s much less compression, there's very specific authoring, we control the color of the picture, the brightness, you know, all these things. When you stream a film, it's like broadcasting a film - we don’t have much control on how it goes out.” Nolan also emphasizes the importance of physical media libraries as a form of film preservation, stating that letting films only exist digitally or on streaming services allows companies to have too much control over their availability, and has expressed concern that the shift towards streaming is prioritising short-term growth over the long-term financial health of the industry.

== See also ==
- Christopher Nolan filmography
- List of awards and nominations received by Christopher Nolan
- List of film director and actor collaborations

== Bibliography ==
- Mottram, James (2002). The Making of Memento. New York: Faber. ISBN 0-571-21488-6.
- Kellner, Douglas M (2009). Cinema Wars: Hollywood Film and Politics in the Bush-Cheney Era. Wiley-Blackwell; 1 edition. ISBN 978-1405198240. Archived from the original on 24 June 2016.
- Hill-Parks, Erin (2010). Discourses of Cinematic Culture and the Hollywood Director: The Development of Christopher Nolan's Auteur Persona. University of Newcastle Upon Tyne.
- Fischer, Mark (2011). The Lost Unconscious: Delusions and Dreams in Inception. Film Quarterly, Volume 64 (3) University of California Press.
- Duncan Jesser, Jody; Pourroy, Janine (2012). The Art and Making of The Dark Knight Trilogy. Abrams. ISBN 978-1-4197-0369-0.
- McGowan, Todd (2012). The Fictional Christopher Nolan. Texas: The University of Texas Press. ISBN 978-0-292-73782-2.
- Rabiger, Michael; Hurbis-Cherrier, Mick (2013). Directing: Film Techniques and Aesthetics. CRC Press. ISBN 978-1-135-09921-3.
- Furby, Jacqueline; Joy, Stuart (2015). The Cinema of Christopher Nolan: Imagining the Impossible. Columbia University Press. ISBN 978-0-231-85076-6.
- Eberl, Jason T.; Dunn, George A. (2017). The Philosophy of Christopher Nolan. Lexington Books. ISBN 978-1-498-51352-4.
- Mooney, Darren (2018). Christopher Nolan: A Critical Study of the Films. McFarland & Company, Inc. ISBN 978-14-766-7480-3.
- Joy, Stuart (2020). The Traumatic Screen: The Films of Christopher Nolan. Intellect, The University of Chicago Press. ISBN 978-1-78938-202-0.
- Shone, Tom (2020). The Nolan Variations: The Movies, Mysteries, and Marvels of Christopher Nolan. Knopf. ISBN 978-05-256-5532-9.
- Joy, Stuart (2020). The Traumatic Screen: The Films of Christopher Nolan. Intellect Ltd. ISBN 978-17-893-8219-8.
- Mottram, James (2020). The Secrets of Tenet: Inside Christopher Nolan's Quantum Cold War. Insight Editions. ISBN 978-1-64722-060-0.
- Kirsch, Konrad (2024). From ›Doodlebug‹ to ›Oppenheimer‹. An Analysis of Christopher Nolan's Film Work. Edition Axel Menges. ISBN 978-3-86905-037-9.
