= List of accolades received by Dunkirk =

Dunkirk accolades
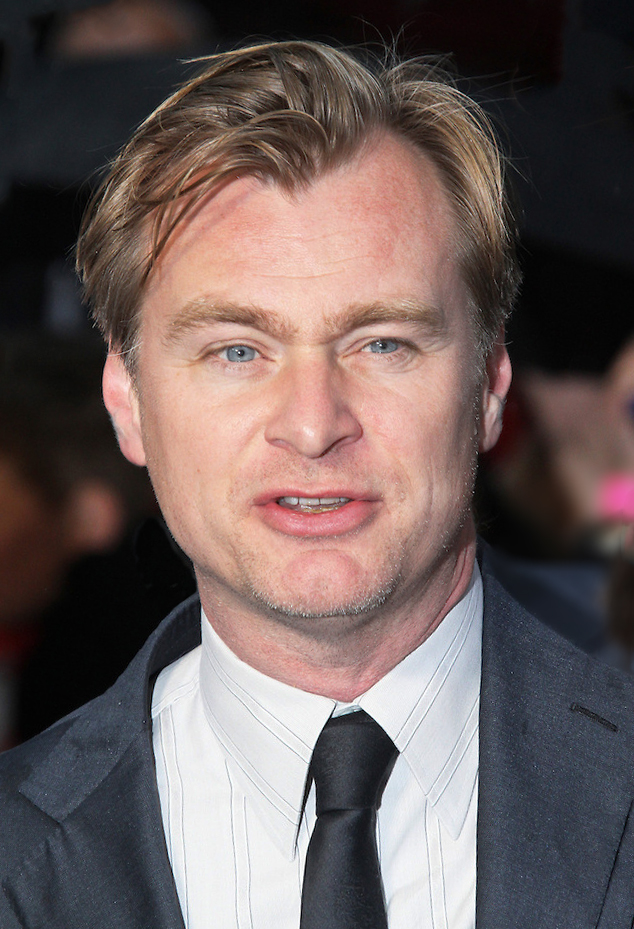
- Christopher Nolan received multiple accolades for his screenplay and direction.
Accolades
| Award | Wins | Nominations |
| AACTA International Awards | 1 | 4 |
| AARP's Movies for Grownups Awards | 1 | 2 |
| Academy Awards | 3 | 8 |
| Alliance of Women Film Journalists | 1 | 3 |
| American Cinema Editors Awards | 1 | 1 |
| American Film Institute Awards | 1 | 1 |
| American Society of Cinematographers | 0 | 1 |
| Art Directors Guild Awards | 1 | 1 |
| Austin Film Critics Association | 1 | 4 |
| Boston Society of Film Critics | 1 | 1 |
| British Academy Film Awards | 1 | 8 |
| Casting Society of America | 1 | 1 |
| Chicago Film Critics Association | 1 | 6 |
| Cinema Audio Society Awards | 1 | 1 |
| Costume Designers Guild Awards | 0 | 1 |
| Critics' Choice Movie Awards | 1 | 8 |
| Dallas–Fort Worth Film Critics Association | 3 | 3 |
| David di Donatello Awards | 1 | 1 |
| Detroit Film Critics Society | 0 | 1 |
| Directors Guild of America Awards | 0 | 1 |
| Dorian Awards | 0 | 2 |
| Dublin Film Critics' Circle | 5 | 5 |
| Empire Awards | 0 | 3 |
| Evening Standard British Film Awards | 0 | 1 |
| Florida Film Critics Circle | 6 | 7 |
| Gaudí Awards | 1 | 1 |
| Georgia Film Critics Association | 2 | 5 |
| Golden Globe Awards | 0 | 3 |
| Grammy Awards | 0 | 1 |
| Hollywood Professional Association | 1 | 1 |
| Houston Film Critics Society | 0 | 4 |
| IGN Awards | 3 | 4 |
| IndieWire Critics Poll | 3 | 3 |
| Location Managers Guild Awards | 1 | 1 |
| London Film Critics' Circle | 1 | 4 |
| Los Angeles Film Critics Association | 1 | 1 |
| National Board of Review | 1 | 1 |
| National Film Awards UK | 0 | 4 |
| National Society of Film Critics | 1 | 1 |
| New York Film Critics Online | 1 | 1 |
| Online Film Critics Society | 2 | 4 |
| Producers Guild of America Award | 0 | 1 |
| San Diego Film Critics Society | 4 | 8 |
| San Francisco Bay Area Film Critics Circle | 0 | 5 |
| Satellite Awards | 1 | 11 |
| Screen Actors Guild Awards | 0 | 1 |
| Seattle Film Critics Society | 2 | 7 |
| St. Louis Film Critics Association | 3 | 5 |
| Vancouver Film Critics Circle | 0 | 2 |
| Visual Effects Society Awards | 1 | 1 |
| Washington D.C. Area Film Critics Association | 1 | 7 |

Totals (Note: Certain award groups do not simply award one winner. They acknowledge several different recipients, have runners-up, and have third place. Since this is a specific recognition and is different from losing an award, runner-up mentions are considered wins in this award tally. For simplification and to avoid errors, each award in this list has been presumed to have had a prior nomination.)
- Wins: 61
- Nominations: 168

Dunkirk is a 2017 epic war film directed by Christopher Nolan. The film depicts the Dunkirk evacuation of World War II through the perspectives of the land, sea, and air. Its ensemble cast includes Fionn Whitehead, Tom Glynn-Carney, Jack Lowden, Harry Styles, Aneurin Barnard, James D'Arcy, Barry Keoghan, Kenneth Branagh, Cillian Murphy, Mark Rylance and Tom Hardy. Nolan wrote the screenplay and produced the film with his wife Emma Thomas. Hans Zimmer composed the film's score, and Lee Smith was the film editor. Alex Gibson, Richard King, Gregg Landaker, Gary A. Rizzo, and Mark Weingarten were responsible for the sound effects.

Dunkirk film premiered at Odeon Leicester Square in London on 13 July 2017. Warner Bros. later gave the film a wide release on 21 July at over 11,000 cinemas internationally including over 3,700 in the United States and Canada and over 600 in the United Kingdom. Dunkirk grossed $525 million on a $100 million budget. On the review aggregator website Rotten Tomatoes, the film holds an approval rating of 92% based on 468 reviews.

Dunkirk garnered awards and nominations in various categories with particular praise for Nolan's directing as well as the film's visual effects, cinematography, sound effects, and editing. It received eight nominations at the 90th Academy Awards including Best Picture and Best Director for Nolan, his first Academy Award nomination in that category. It went on to win Best Film Editing, Best Sound Editing, and Best Sound Mixing. The film earned eight nominations at the 71st British Academy Film Awards, winning Best Sound. At the 75th Golden Globe Awards, Dunkirk received nominations for Best Motion Picture – Drama, Best Director, and Best Original Score for Zimmer. The film was nominated for Best Theatrical Motion Picture at the 29th Producers Guild of America Awards while Nolan received a nomination for Outstanding Directing – Feature Film at the 70th Directors Guild of America Awards. Both the American Film Institute and National Board of Review named Dunkirk one of the Top 10 films of 2017.

== Accolades ==
Accolades received by Dunkirk
| Award | Date of ceremony | Category | Recipients | Result | Ref. |
|---|---|---|---|---|---|
| AACTA International Awards | 6 January 2018 | Best Film | Dunkirk | Nominated | |
| AACTA International Awards | 6 January 2018 | Best Direction | Christopher Nolan | Won | |
| AACTA International Awards | 6 January 2018 | Best Screenplay | Christopher Nolan | Nominated | |
| AACTA International Awards | 6 January 2018 | Best Supporting Actor | Tom Hardy | Nominated | |
| AARP's Movies for Grownups Awards | 5 February 2018 | Best Time Capsule | Dunkirk | Won | |
| AARP's Movies for Grownups Awards | 5 February 2018 | Readers' Choice Poll | Dunkirk | Nominated | |
| Academy Awards | 4 March 2018 | Best Picture | Emma Thomas and Christopher Nolan | Nominated | |
| Academy Awards | 4 March 2018 | Best Director | Christopher Nolan | Nominated | |
| Academy Awards | 4 March 2018 | Best Cinematography | Hoyte van Hoytema | Nominated | |
| Academy Awards | 4 March 2018 | Best Film Editing | Lee Smith | Won | |
| Academy Awards | 4 March 2018 | Best Original Score | Hans Zimmer | Nominated | |
| Academy Awards | 4 March 2018 | Best Production Design | Nathan Crowley and Gary Fettis | Nominated | |
| Academy Awards | 4 March 2018 | Best Sound Editing | Richard King and Alex Gibson | Won | |
| Academy Awards | 4 March 2018 | Best Sound Mixing | Gregg Landaker, Gary A. Rizzo, and Mark Weingarten | Won | |
| Alliance of Women Film Journalists | 9 January 2018 | Best Director | Christopher Nolan | Nominated | |
| Alliance of Women Film Journalists | 9 January 2018 | Best Cinematography | Hoyte van Hoytema | Nominated | |
| Alliance of Women Film Journalists | 9 January 2018 | Best Editing | Lee Smith | Won | |
| American Cinema Editors | 26 January 2018 | Best Edited Feature Film – Dramatic | Lee Smith | Won | |
| American Film Institute Awards | 5 January 2018 | Top 10 Films of the Year | Dunkirk | Won | |
| American Society of Cinematographers | 17 February 2018 | Outstanding Achievement in Cinematography in Theatrical Releases | Hoyte van Hoytema | Nominated | |
| Art Directors Guild | 27 January 2018 | Excellence in Production Design for a Period Film | Nathan Crowley | Nominated | |
| Austin Film Critics Association | 8 January 2018 | Best Director | Christopher Nolan | Nominated | |
| Austin Film Critics Association | 8 January 2018 | Best Cinematography | Hoyte van Hoytema | Nominated | |
| Austin Film Critics Association | 8 January 2018 | Best Original Score | Hans Zimmer | Nominated | |
| Austin Film Critics Association | 8 January 2018 | Top 10 Films | Dunkirk | 7th Place | |
| Boston Society of Film Critics | 10 December 2017 | Best Cinematography | Hoyte van Hoytema | Won | |
| British Academy Film Awards | 18 February 2018 | Best Film | Christopher Nolan and Emma Thomas | Nominated | |
| British Academy Film Awards | 18 February 2018 | Best Direction | Christopher Nolan | Nominated | |
| British Academy Film Awards | 18 February 2018 | Best Cinematography | Hoyte van Hoytema | Nominated | |
| British Academy Film Awards | 18 February 2018 | Best Film Music | Hans Zimmer | Nominated | |
| British Academy Film Awards | 18 February 2018 | Best Editing | Lee Smith | Nominated | |
| British Academy Film Awards | 18 February 2018 | Best Sound | Richard King, Gregg Landaker, Gary Rizzo, and Mark Weingarten | Won | |
| British Academy Film Awards | 18 February 2018 | Best Production Design | Nathan Crowley and Gary Fettis | Nominated | |
| British Academy Film Awards | 18 February 2018 | Best Special Visual Effects | Scott Fisher and Andrew Jackson | Nominated | |
| Casting Society of America | 18 January 2018 | Big Budget – Drama | John Papsidera | Won | |
| Chicago Film Critics Association | 12 December 2017 | Best Picture | Dunkirk | Nominated | |
| Chicago Film Critics Association | 12 December 2017 | Best Director | Christopher Nolan | Won | |
| Chicago Film Critics Association | 12 December 2017 | Best Editing | Lee Smith | Nominated | |
| Chicago Film Critics Association | 12 December 2017 | Best Original Score | Hans Zimmer | Nominated | |
| Chicago Film Critics Association | 12 December 2017 | Best Cinematography | Hoyte van Hoytema | Nominated | |
| Chicago Film Critics Association | 12 December 2017 | Best Art Direction | Dunkirk | Nominated | |
| Cinema Audio Society Awards | 24 February 2018 | Motion Picture — Live Action | Thomas J. O’Connell, Scott Curtis, Gregg Landaker, Alan Meyerson, Gary Rizzo, and Mark Weingarten | Won | |
| Costume Designers Guild | 20 February 2018 | Excellence in Period Film | Jeffrey Kurland | Nominated | |
| Critics' Choice Movie Awards | 11 January 2018 | Best Picture | Dunkirk | Nominated | |
| Critics' Choice Movie Awards | 11 January 2018 | Best Acting Ensemble | The cast of Dunkirk | Nominated | |
| Critics' Choice Movie Awards | 11 January 2018 | Best Director | Christopher Nolan | Nominated | |
| Critics' Choice Movie Awards | 11 January 2018 | Best Score | Hans Zimmer | Nominated | |
| Critics' Choice Movie Awards | 11 January 2018 | Best Cinematography | Hoyte van Hoytema | Nominated | |
| Critics' Choice Movie Awards | 11 January 2018 | Best Production Design | Nathan Crowley and Gary Fettis | Nominated | |
| Critics' Choice Movie Awards | 11 January 2018 | Best Editing | Lee Smith | Won | |
| Critics' Choice Movie Awards | 11 January 2018 | Best Visual Effects | Dunkirk | Nominated | |
| Dallas–Fort Worth Film Critics Association | 13 December 2017 | Best Picture | Dunkirk | 6th Place | |
| Dallas–Fort Worth Film Critics Association | 13 December 2017 | Best Director | Christopher Nolan | 3rd Place | |
| Dallas–Fort Worth Film Critics Association | 13 December 2017 | Best Musical Score | Hans Zimmer | 2nd Place | |
| David di Donatello Awards | 21 March 2018 | Best Foreign Film | Dunkirk | Won | |
| Detroit Film Critics Society | 7 December 2017 | Best Director | Christopher Nolan | Nominated | |
| Directors Guild of America Awards | 3 February 2018 | Outstanding Directing – Feature Film | Christopher Nolan | Nominated | |
| Dorian Awards | 24 February 2018 | Director of the Year | Christopher Nolan | Nominated | |
| Dorian Awards | 24 February 2018 | Visually Striking Film of the Year | Dunkirk | Nominated | |
| Dublin Film Critics' Circle | 13 December 2017 | Best Film | Dunkirk | Won | |
| Dublin Film Critics' Circle | 13 December 2017 | Best Director | Christopher Nolan | Won | |
| Dublin Film Critics' Circle | 13 December 2017 | Best Screenplay | Christopher Nolan | 7th Place | |
| Dublin Film Critics' Circle | 13 December 2017 | Best Cinematography | Hoyte van Hoytema | 2nd Place | |
| Dublin Film Critics' Circle | 13 December 2017 | Breakthrough Artist of the Year | Barry Keoghan (Note: Also for The Killing of a Sacred Deer) | Won | |
| Empire Awards | 18 March 2018 | Best Male Newcomer | Fionn Whitehead | Nominated | |
| Empire Awards | 18 March 2018 | Best British Film | Dunkirk | Nominated | |
| Empire Awards | 18 March 2018 | Best Production Design | Dunkirk | Nominated | |
| Evening Standard British Film Awards | 8 February 2018 | Everyman Award for Best Film | Dunkirk | Nominated | |
| Florida Film Critics Circle | 23 December 2017 | Best Film | Dunkirk | Won | |
| Florida Film Critics Circle | 23 December 2017 | Best Director | Christopher Nolan | Won | |
| Florida Film Critics Circle | 23 December 2017 | Best Cast | The cast of Dunkirk | Runner-up | |
| Florida Film Critics Circle | 23 December 2017 | Best Cinematography | Hoyte van Hoytema | Runner-up | |
| Florida Film Critics Circle | 23 December 2017 | Best Score | Hans Zimmer | Runner-up | |
| Florida Film Critics Circle | 23 December 2017 | Best Art Direction and Production Design | Dunkirk | Runner-up | |
| Florida Film Critics Circle | 23 December 2017 | Best Visual Effects | Dunkirk | Nominated | |
| Gaudí Awards | 28 January 2018 | Best European Film | Dunkirk | Won | |
| Georgia Film Critics Association | 12 January 2018 | Best Picture | Dunkirk | Nominated | |
| Georgia Film Critics Association | 12 January 2018 | Best Director | Christopher Nolan | Nominated | |
| Georgia Film Critics Association | 12 January 2018 | Best Cinematography | Hoyte van Hoytema | Won | |
| Georgia Film Critics Association | 12 January 2018 | Best Production Design | Nathan Crowley and Gary Fettis | Nominated | |
| Georgia Film Critics Association | 12 January 2018 | Best Original Score | Hans Zimmer | Won | |
| Golden Eagle Award | 26 January 2018 | Best Foreign Language Film | Dunkirk | Nominated | |
| Golden Globe Awards | 7 January 2018 | Best Motion Picture – Drama | Dunkirk | Nominated | |
| Golden Globe Awards | 7 January 2018 | Best Director | Christopher Nolan | Nominated | |
| Golden Globe Awards | 7 January 2018 | Best Original Score | Hans Zimmer | Nominated | |
| Golden Reel Awards | 18 February 2018 | Outstanding Achievement in Sound Editing – Music Score | Alex Gibson, Ryan Rubin and Chris Barrett | Won | |
| Golden Reel Awards | 18 February 2018 | Outstanding Achievement in Sound Editing – Dialogue / ADR | Hugo Weng, David Bach and Russell Farmarco | Nominated | |
| Golden Reel Awards | 18 February 2018 | Outstanding Achievement in Sound Editing – Effects / Foley | Richard King, Michael Mitchell, Randy Torres, Michael Dressel, John Roesch, and Shelley Roden | Nominated | |
| Grammy Awards | 28 January 2018 | Best Score Soundtrack for Visual Media | Dunkirk: Original Motion Picture Soundtrack | Nominated | |
| Hollywood Professional Association | 16 November 2017 | Outstanding Editing – Feature Film | Lee Smith | Won | |
| Houston Film Critics Society | 6 January 2018 | Best Picture | Dunkirk | Nominated | |
| Houston Film Critics Society | 6 January 2018 | Best Direction of a Motion Picture | Christopher Nolan | Nominated | |
| Houston Film Critics Society | 6 January 2018 | Best Cinematography | Hoyte van Hoytema | Nominated | |
| Houston Film Critics Society | 6 January 2018 | Best Original Score | Hans Zimmer | Nominated | |
| IGN Awards | 19 December 2017 | Best Drama Movie | Dunkirk | Runner-up | |
| IGN Awards | 19 December 2017 | People's Choice Award for Best Drama Movie | Dunkirk | Won | |
| IGN Awards | 19 December 2017 | Best Director | Christopher Nolan | Nominated | |
| IGN Awards | 19 December 2017 | People's Choice Award for Best Director | Christopher Nolan | Won | |
| IndieWire Critics Poll | 19 December 2016 | Most Anticipated of 2017 | Dunkirk | 3rd Place | |
| IndieWire Critics Poll | 19 December 2017 | Best Picture | Dunkirk | 3rd Place | |
| IndieWire Critics Poll | 19 December 2017 | Best Cinematography | Hoyte van Hoytema | 2nd Place | |
| Location Managers Guild Awards | 7 April 2018 | Outstanding Locations in Period Film | Ben Piltz and Arnaud Kaiser | Won | |
| London Film Critics' Circle | 28 January 2018 | Film of the Year | Dunkirk | Nominated | |
| London Film Critics' Circle | 28 January 2018 | British/Irish Film of the Year | Dunkirk | Won | |
| London Film Critics' Circle | 28 January 2018 | Director of the Year | Christopher Nolan | Nominated | |
| London Film Critics' Circle | 28 January 2018 | Young British/Irish Performer of the Year | Fionn Whitehead | Nominated | |
| London Film Critics' Circle | 28 January 2018 | Technical Achievement Award | Hans Zimmer | Nominated | |
| Los Angeles Film Critics Association | 13 January 2018 | Best Editing | Lee Smith | Won | |
| National Board of Review | 9 January 2018 | Top Ten Films | Dunkirk | Won | |
| National Film Awards UK | 29 March 2018 | Best British Film | Dunkirk | Nominated | |
| National Film Awards UK | 29 March 2018 | Best Director | Christopher Nolan | Nominated | |
| National Film Awards UK | 29 March 2018 | Best Breakthrough Performance | Harry Styles | Nominated | |
| National Film Awards UK | 29 March 2018 | Best Newcomer | Harry Styles | Nominated | |
| National Society of Film Critics | 6 January 2018 | Best Cinematography | Hoyte van Hoytema | 2nd Place | |
| New York Film Critics Online | 10 December 2017 | Top 10 Films | Dunkirk | Won | |
| Online Film Critics Society | 28 December 2017 | Best Picture | Dunkirk | Nominated | |
| Online Film Critics Society | 28 December 2017 | Best Director | Christopher Nolan | Won | |
| Online Film Critics Society | 28 December 2017 | Best Cinematography | Hoyte van Hoytema | Nominated | |
| Online Film Critics Society | 28 December 2017 | Best Editing | Lee Smith | Won | |
| Producers Guild of America Awards | 20 January 2018 | Best Theatrical Motion Picture | Christopher Nolan and Emma Thomas | Nominated | |
| San Diego Film Critics Society | 11 December 2017 | Best Picture | Dunkirk | Nominated | |
| San Diego Film Critics Society | 11 December 2017 | Best Director | Christopher Nolan | Runner-up | |
| San Diego Film Critics Society | 11 December 2017 | Best Original Screenplay | Christopher Nolan | Nominated | |
| San Diego Film Critics Society | 11 December 2017 | Best Cinematography | Hoyte van Hoytema | Won | |
| San Diego Film Critics Society | 11 December 2017 | Best Production Design | Nathan Crowley | Nominated | |
| San Diego Film Critics Society | 11 December 2017 | Best Editing | Lee Smith | Runner-up | |
| San Diego Film Critics Society | 11 December 2017 | Best Visual Effects | Dunkirk | Runner-up (Note: Tied with Beauty and the Beast) | |
| San Diego Film Critics Society | 11 December 2017 | Best Use of Music | Dunkirk | Nominated | |
| San Francisco Film Critics Circle | 10 December 2017 | Best Director | Christopher Nolan | Nominated | |
| San Francisco Film Critics Circle | 10 December 2017 | Best Cinematography | Hoyte van Hoytema | Nominated | |
| San Francisco Film Critics Circle | 10 December 2017 | Best Production Design | Nathan Crowley | Nominated | |
| San Francisco Film Critics Circle | 10 December 2017 | Best Editing | Lee Smith | Nominated | |
| San Francisco Film Critics Circle | 10 December 2017 | Best Original Score | Hans Zimmer | Nominated | |
| Satellite Awards | 10 February 2018 | Best Film | Dunkirk | Nominated | |
| Satellite Awards | 10 February 2018 | Best Director | Christopher Nolan | Nominated | |
| Satellite Awards | 10 February 2018 | Best Original Screenplay | Christopher Nolan | Nominated | |
| Satellite Awards | 10 February 2018 | Best Supporting Actor | Mark Rylance | Nominated | |
| Satellite Awards | 10 February 2018 | Best Cinematography | Hoyte van Hoytema | Nominated | |
| Satellite Awards | 10 February 2018 | Best Original Score | Hans Zimmer | Nominated | |
| Satellite Awards | 10 February 2018 | Best Film Editing | Lee Smith | Nominated | |
| Satellite Awards | 10 February 2018 | Best Costume Design | Jeffrey Kurland | Nominated | |
| Satellite Awards | 10 February 2018 | Best Visual Effects | Dunkirk | Nominated | |
| Satellite Awards | 10 February 2018 | Best Art Direction and Production Design | Dunkirk | Nominated | |
| Satellite Awards | 10 February 2018 | Best Sound (Editing and Mixing) | Dunkirk | Won | |
| Saturn Awards | 27 June 2018 | Best Action or Adventure Film | Dunkirk | Nominated | |
| Screen Actors Guild Awards | 21 January 2018 | Outstanding Performance by a Stunt Ensemble in a Motion Picture | Dunkirk | Nominated | |
| Seattle Film Critics Society | 18 December 2017 | Best Picture of the Year | Dunkirk | Nominated | |
| Seattle Film Critics Society | 18 December 2017 | Best Director | Christopher Nolan | Won | |
| Seattle Film Critics Society | 18 December 2017 | Best Cinematography | Hoyte van Hoytema | Nominated | |
| Seattle Film Critics Society | 18 December 2017 | Best Film Editing | Lee Smith | Won | |
| Seattle Film Critics Society | 18 December 2017 | Best Original Score | Hans Zimmer | Nominated | |
| Seattle Film Critics Society | 18 December 2017 | Best Production Design | Nathan Crowley and Gary Fettis | Nominated | |
| Seattle Film Critics Society | 18 December 2017 | Best Visual Effects | Paul Corbould, Scott Fisher, Andrew Jackson, and Andrew Lockley | Nominated | |
| St. Louis Film Critics Association | 17 December 2017 | Best Cinematography | Hoyte van Hoytema | Runner-up | |
| St. Louis Film Critics Association | 17 December 2017 | Best Editing | Lee Smith | Runner-up (Note: Tied with Sidney Wolinsky for The Shape of Water) | |
| St. Louis Film Critics Association | 17 December 2017 | Best Score | Hans Zimmer | Runner-up | |
| St. Louis Film Critics Association | 17 December 2017 | Best Production Design | Nathan Crowley | Nominated | |
| St. Louis Film Critics Association | 17 December 2017 | Best Visual Effects | Dunkirk | Nominated | |
| Vancouver Film Critics Circle | 6 January 2018 | Best Film | Dunkirk | Nominated | |
| Vancouver Film Critics Circle | 6 January 2018 | Best Director | Christopher Nolan | Nominated | |
| Visual Effects Society Awards | 13 February 2018 | Outstanding Supporting Visual Effects in a Photoreal Feature | Mike Chambers, Scott Fisher, Andrew Jackson, Andrew Lockley, and Alison Wortman | Won | |
| Washington D.C. Area Film Critics Association | 8 December 2017 | Best Film | Dunkirk | Nominated | |
| Washington D.C. Area Film Critics Association | 8 December 2017 | Best Director | Christopher Nolan | Won | |
| Washington D.C. Area Film Critics Association | 8 December 2017 | Best Acting Ensemble | The cast of Dunkirk | Nominated | |
| Washington D.C. Area Film Critics Association | 8 December 2017 | Best Cinematography | Hoyte van Hoytema | Nominated | |
| Washington D.C. Area Film Critics Association | 8 December 2017 | Best Production Design | Nathan Crowley and Gary Fettis | Nominated | |
| Washington D.C. Area Film Critics Association | 8 December 2017 | Best Editing | Lee Smith | Nominated | |
| Washington D.C. Area Film Critics Association | 8 December 2017 | Best Original Score | Hans Zimmer | Nominated | |

== See also ==
- 2017 in film
