= Steve Johnson (director) =

English film director (born 1972)

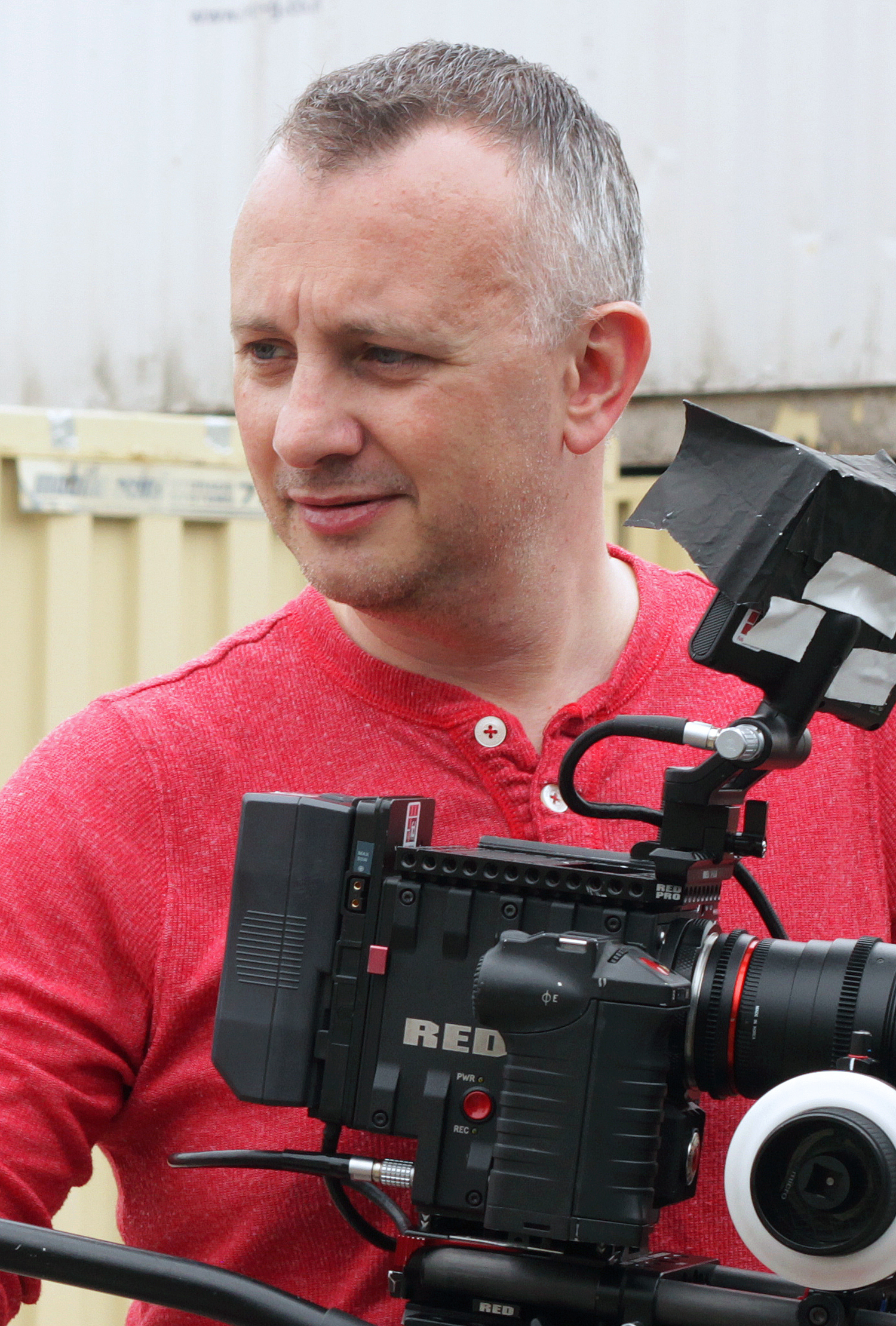
- Born: 29 December 1972 (age 53); Liverpool, England
- Occupation: Film director
- Years active: 2005–present
- Notable work: Convergence; Stalker
- Spouse: Margaret Johnson (m. 1999)

Steve Johnson is an English film director.

== Life and career ==
Steve Johnson was born in Liverpool in England. At school, Johnson was a keen middle distance runner and set a Great Britain record for his age group in the 4x1,500 metre relay. He took part in a student exchange programme which allowed him to study in Michigan in the United States. During his time here, he became Michigan State Cross Country Champion and participated in many running events including the Athletic Congress national cross country meet at Purdue University and the Invitational Cross Country meet at Bullock Creek.

Johnson's love for film first began after seeing Star Wars at the Futurist Theatre in Liverpool. In November 2005, Johnson established Futurist Online Ltd (later becoming Futurist Digital Ltd in 2013) in Glasgow, Scotland. Over the years, Johnson developed his skills on the Red Digital Cinema Camera Company camera system and later became a freelance trainer and course producer for their REDucation courses and has taught in many cities across the globe including Brisbane, Berlin, Dubai, London, Los Angeles, Madrid, Moscow, Oslo and Singapore. He has also held classes at Pinewood Studios and YouTube Space, London.

In 2014, Futurist Digital teamed up with Production Attic and Quick Off The Mark Productions to film and produce three short children's films for a competition run by Vue Cinemas. The competition asked school children from Aultmore Park Primary School to draw a short storyboard for a film with the top three concepts being made into real short films and shown at their local cinema.

The following year, Johnson served as a post production supervisor for the short film When The Tide Comes In which went on to receive a nomination for Best Composer at the 2015 British Academy Scotland New Talent Awards.

In 2015, Johnson launched an online crowd funding campaign to raise money for what would become his directorial debut and his first feature film project. The Students of Springfield Street follows twenty-four hours in the lives of six friends, examining interpersonal connections and the intricate weave of words, actions and emotions that unknowingly link and change the direction of their day. The crowd funding campaign for the film was successful and raise $6000 in just 4 weeks.

The film was released on 26 June 2015 and was warmly received by critics both at home and abroad. Film review website Indyred wrote:

"The Students Of Springfield Street easily earns it's rating based on only two elements, clever writing and some damn fine acting. Mr. Johnson is a master of pretext, giving this movie a reason to "hit rewind" and see what you may have missed."

On 23 October 2015, the film had its UK Debut at the Aberdeen Film Festival. The film proved to be a hit with the festival's jurors who awarded the film the Best Feature award. Speaking about his win to Creative Clyde, Johnson said:

"I am proud that our first full-length production has achieved ‘Best Picture’ recognition. I wanted a film that would spark some discussion over tone, style and the stereotypes surrounding Scottish movies. I wanted The Students of Springfield Street to bring a fresh look at young people and their lives in a very stylised way."

Johnson released his second feature film, Convergence (2019 film) in 2019, premiering at Cineworld, Leicester Square, London as part of the 2019 British Independent Film Festival, where it won Best Feature Film and was nominated for a further four awards including Best Actor, Best Actress, Best Supporting Actor and Best Cinematography. The film stars Jeremy Theobald and Nicolette McKeown.

'Convergence' played at numerous film festival around the world, also winning Best Feature Film at the 2019 Cardiff International Film Festival. The film has received numerous positive reviews:

"For a film dealing with numerous angsty themes, Johnson does supremely well to explore them in a manner that feels controlled and minimalist. Whilst there are sequences where the drama explodes on screen, such as Lily talking about her childhood or grappling with her ex, the majority of the film feels like a contemplative piece where the viewer is palpably experiencing the grief and distress of the two central characters. A large part of this is due to the character of Martin and the understated performance from Theobald."

"Jeremy Theobald is great as Martin, conveying the character’s anguish and pain believably. His chemistry with McKeown is excellent, and they make for a credible and engaging onscreen pair. It is Nicolette McKeown though, who owns the entire movie. Her going from scared and traumatized to self-assured and take charge is expertly pulled off. McKeown imbues each and every aspect of that arc with tenderness and emotional honesty that resonates with the viewer on a profound level. Convergence doesn’t exactly do subtle, as it leans heavily on the symbolism. Plus there is one actor that does not entirely sell his character. Beyond that though, Steve Johnson has crafted an impressive, hypnotic film that is equal parts drama and mystery, with fantastic acting."

In 2021, Johnson directed his third feature film, the psychological thriller 'Stalker', written by Chris Watt and produced by production company Stronghold. The film stars bafta winning actor Stuart Brennan with cinematography by Blue Story Simon Stolland. In 2022, 'Stalker' had its World Premiere in Leicester Square, London, as part of Frightfest 2022 and was distributed in the UK on DVD and Digital by Kaleidoscope Film Distribution and in the United States by Gravitas Ventures. 'Stalker' received numerous 4* reviews.

"Utilising mainly one location (although the opening shots of the rain-soaked surrounds are exquisitely shot), namely a rather spacious service lift, is clearly a sign of a film having a low budget. However, Johnson’s film has a secret weapon vital for any film to succeed: great actors. Skelton and Brennan are believable in their roles. Brennan provides the right amount of anxiety and eeriness to Daniel and it’s easy to feel Rose’s discomfort. Johnson ramps the tension, creating a claustrophobic atmosphere that builds to a dramatic conclusion."

== Filmography ==
Year	Film	Credited as				Notes
Year	Film	Director	Cinematographer	Producer	Writer	Notes
2015	The Students of Springfield Street	Yes		Yes	Yes	
2015	Float		Yes			
2015	February 29th		Yes			
2015	Dog Dayz		Yes			
2015	Fanatic		Yes			2nd Unit Director of Photography
2015	A Fire Within		Yes	Yes		
2016	Day 29	Yes	Yes			
2016	Wee Amy		Yes			
2016	Harm		Yes	Yes		
2016	Round Habit		Yes			
2016	Killing People		Yes			
2018	She of the Land		Yes			
2018	Wolves in Winter		Yes			
2019	Convergence	Yes	Yes	Yes	Yes	
2019	Mia: A Rapture 2.0 Production		Yes			
2020	Autumn Never Dies		Yes			
2020	She of the Land		Yes			
2021	Custodian		Yes			
2022	Stalker	Yes				
2022	Snapshot	Yes			Yes	
2024	Heated	Yes				
2024	The Fartist	Yes		Yes		
2024	Sealgair	Yes		Yes		
2024	The Defender		Yes			
2026	Standing on the Bridge	Yes		Yes	Yes	

== Awards and nominations ==
Year	Awards	Category	Film	Result
2015	Aberdeen Film Festival	Best Feature	The Students of Springfield Street	Won
2018	Sydney Indie Film Festival	Best Cinematography	Mia: A Rapture 2.0 Production	Nominated
2019	British Independent Film Festival	Best Feature Film	Convergence	Won
2019	British Independent Film Festival	Best Cinematography	Convergence	Nominated
2019	New Directors Hollywood Showcase	Best Feature Film	Convergence	Nominated
2019	LA Edge Film Awards	Best Narrative Feature Film	Convergence	Won
2019	LA Edge Film Awards	Best Director	Convergence	Won
2019	LA Edge Film Awards	Best Cinematography	Convergence	Won
2019	LA Edge Film Awards	Best Editing	Convergence	Won
2019	United States Film Festival	Best International Feature Film	Convergence	Won
2019	United States Film Festival	Best Cinematography	Convergence	Won
2019	Los Angeles Theatrical Release Competition & Awards	Best Director Feature (US & International)	Convergence	Won
2019	Los Angeles Theatrical Release Competition & Awards	Best Cinematography Feature (US & International)	Convergence	Won
2019	Cardiff International Film Festival	Best Feature Film	Convergence	Won
2019	Skiptown International Film Festival	Best Feature Film	Convergence	Nominated
2019	Skiptown International Film Festival	Best Original Screenplay	Convergence	Nominated
2019	European Independent Film Awards	Best Cinematography	Convergence	Nominated
2019	Antakya International Film Festival	Best International Feature Film	Convergence	Nominated
2019	Antakya International Film Festival	Special Jury Award	Convergence	Won
2020	London International Motion Picture Awards	Best Feature Film	Convergence	Nominated
2020	London International Motion Picture Awards	Best Director	Convergence	Nominated
2020	London International Motion Picture Awards	Best Cinematography	Convergence	Nominated
2020	The Scottish Short Film Festival	Best Cinematography	She of the Land	Nominated
2020	Diabolical Horror Film Festival	Best Cinematography	She of the Land	Nominated
2020	Independent Horror Movie Awards	Best Cinematography	She of the Land	Nominated
2020	Top Indie Film Awards	Best Cinematography	Autumn Never Dies	Nominated
2021	Night of Comedy Shorts	Best Cinematography	Autumn Never Dies	Won
2022	Scotland International Festival of Cinema	Juan Ruiz Anchia Award for Best Cinematography for a Featurette	Autumn Never Dies	Nominated
2022	The Scottish Short Film Festival	Best Director	Snapshot	Nominated
2023	The Art Film Awards	Best Cinematography	The Defender	Won
2023	Milan Independent Awards	Best Cinematography	The Defender	Won
2023	8 & Halfilm Awards	Best Cinematography	The Defender	Won
2023	White Rose International Film Festival	Best Cinematography	The Defender	Nominated
