= Following =

1998 film by Christopher Nolan

- Theatrical release poster
- Directed by: Christopher Nolan
- Written by: Christopher Nolan
- Produced by: Christopher Nolan; Jeremy Theobald; Emma Thomas
- Starring: Jeremy Theobald; Alex Haw; Lucy Russell; John Nolan
- Cinematography: Christopher Nolan
- Edited by: Gareth Heal; Christopher Nolan
- Music by: David Julyan
- Production company: Next Wave Films
- Distributed by: Momentum Pictures
- Release dates: 24 April 1998 (San Francisco); 5 November 1999 (United Kingdom)
- Running time: 70 minutes
- Country: United Kingdom
- Language: English
- Budget: $6,000
- Box office: $126,052

Following is a 1998 British independent neo-noir film written, directed, photographed and edited by Christopher Nolan in his feature film directorial debut. He co-produced the film with his wife, Emma Thomas, and actor Jeremy Theobald. Using a non-linear narrative, it tells the story of an aspiring writer (Theobald) who follows strangers around the streets of London and is drawn into a criminal underworld when he fails to keep his distance.

Inspired by a burglary at his London flat, Nolan conceived Following as an "ultra-low budget" film noir and wrote the screenplay around resources at hand. As the crew consisted largely of Nolan's friends, all of whom held full-time jobs, principal photography took place exclusively on weekends across the course of a year. Much of the film was shot in the homes of Nolan's family and friends. Extensive rehearsals enabled scenes to be completed in a minimal amount of takes, which allowed the production to conserve expensive 16 mm film stock. Nolan financed the production himself from his own salary working on corporate videos.

Following screened at the 41st San Francisco International Film Festival on 24 April 1998. It was released on DVD and Blu-ray by The Criterion Collection in 2012.

== Plot ==
A struggling, unemployed young writer (credited as "The Young Man") takes to following strangers around the streets of London, ostensibly to find inspiration for his first novel. Initially, he sets strict rules for himself regarding whom he should follow and for how long, but he soon discards them as he focuses on a well-groomed, handsome man in a dark suit. The man in the suit, having noticed he is being followed, quickly confronts the Young Man and introduces himself as "Cobb". Cobb reveals he is a serial burglar and invites the Young Man (who tells Cobb his name is "Bill") to accompany him on burglaries. The material gains from these crimes seem to be of secondary importance to Cobb. He takes pleasure in rifling through the personal items in his targets' flats and drinking their wine. He explains his true passion is using the shock of robbery, and violation of property, to make his victims re-examine their lives. He sums up his attitude thus: "You take it away, and show them what they had."

The Young Man is thrilled by Cobb's lifestyle. He attempts break-ins of his own, as Cobb encourages and guides him. At Cobb's suggestion, he alters his appearance, cutting his hair short and wearing a dark suit. He assumes the identity of "Daniel Lloyd", the name on the stolen credit card Cobb gives to him, and begins to pursue a relationship with a blonde woman whose flat he and Cobb burgled. The Blonde tells him she is the girlfriend of a small-time gangster, known only as the "Bald Guy", with whom she broke up after he and his gang murdered a man in her flat. Soon, the Blonde confides that the Bald Guy is blackmailing her with incriminating photographs. The Young Man breaks into the Bald Guy's safe but is caught in the act by a guard. He bludgeons the man with a hammer and flees with money and photos from the safe. Upon returning to his flat, he finds the photos are innocuous modelling shots.

Confronting the Blonde, the Young Man learns that she and Cobb have been working together to manipulate him into mimicking Cobb's burglary methods. She tells him that Cobb had recently discovered a murdered woman's body during one of his burglaries and that Cobb is attempting to deflect suspicion from himself by making it appear as though multiple burglars share his MO.

The Young Man leaves to turn himself in to the police. The Blonde reports her success to Cobb, who then reveals he actually works for the Bald Guy. The story about the murdered woman was part of a plot to deceive both the Blonde and the Young Man. The Blonde has been blackmailing the Bald Guy with evidence from the murder he committed in her flat, and he wants her killed in a way that cannot be connected to him. Cobb bludgeons the Blonde to death with the same hammer the Young Man used during the burglary of the Bald Guy's safe and leaves it at the scene. The police, checking out the Young Man's story, find the Blonde dead, the hammer with his fingerprints on it, and several other pieces of incriminating evidence. The Young Man is thus implicated in the murder of the Blonde. Meanwhile, Cobb vanishes.

== Cast ==
- Jeremy Theobald as The Young Man Bill / Daniel Lloyd
- Alex Haw as Cobb
- Lucy Russell as The Blonde
- John Nolan as The Policeman
- Dick Bradsell as The Bald Guy
- Gillian El-Kadi as home owner
- Jennifer Angel as waitress
- Nicolas Carlotti as barman
- Darren Ormandy as accountant

== Production ==
=== Writing ===
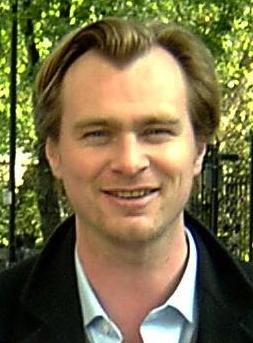
Writer and director Christopher Nolan, c. 2005

Filmmaker Christopher Nolan worked on corporate training videos prior to developing his first feature film. He lived in a flat on a crowded street in London and became interested in the concept that a crowd can be viewed as both a mass and as individual people with unique lives. After his flat was burgled, Nolan incorporated that experience of being "violated" with the earlier concept to develop Following. He noted: "I was interested in the certain types of people who would stop observing [social] protocols, and why that would be." Following was always planned as an "ultra-low budget" film; Nolan wrote with his limited resources and the rough-and-ready shooting style in mind. He intentionally wrote the lead role for Jeremy Theobald, an actor who had previously starred in Nolan's short film Larceny (1996). Following bears similarities to Larceny; both include a scene where an unnamed burglar, played by Theobald, breaks into a flat but is discovered by its occupants.

Nolan's screenplay follows a non-linear plot structure, a device he has regularly used in his subsequent films. He initially scripted the story in chronological order with the intention of restructuring it during script editing. However, he found that he "had to do so much rewriting to make it coherent [and] make it flow for an audience", leading him to abandon that process for later projects. The non-linear structure was partially motivated by the need to accommodate for a sporadic shooting schedule, which would make keeping continuity difficult. In 2002, Nolan stated: "In a compelling story of [film noir] we are continually being asked to rethink our assessment of the relationship between the various characters, and I decided to structure my story in such a way as to emphasize the audience's incomplete understanding of each new scene as it is first presented."

=== Filming ===
Nolan both directed and shot Following, as well as co-producing with his wife Emma Thomas and lead actor Jeremy Theobald. Nolan's uncle, actor and acting teacher John Nolan, advised him prior to filming on how to direct actors, and also portrayed The Policeman in the film. Nolan described the film's production as "extreme" even for a "no-budget" shoot. The crew was made up of Nolan's friends, all of whom were working full-time jobs on weekdays. As a result, filming exclusively took place on Saturdays. Nolan paid for the film himself, spending half of his salary on for film stock and processing. Nolan and Thomas later estimated the film's budget as respectively £3,000–3,500 or $6,000.

Alex Haw and Lucy Russell, colleagues of Theobald from his university drama society, were cast in the two other major roles. All three actors agreed not to cut their hair or leave the United Kingdom unexpectedly for the remainder of production, which was estimated at taking three months. The actors wore their own clothes in the film. Nolan and the cast rehearsed two evenings a week for six months prior to filming. These extensive rehearsals ensured the production could efficiently shoot scenes in the short amount of time that they had access to locations. It also meant that expensive film stock could be conserved by only using the first or second take in the final edit. Nolan shot about fifteen minutes of raw footage each day. He estimated the shooting ratio as 3:1. Thomas described the core crew as "about six to ten people... whoever was around". The cast and crew were sufficiently small that they could travel together in a single taxi when moving between filming locations. Production was halted after Haw shaved his head, resuming once his hair had grown back. In the intervening time, Nolan directed a short film titled Doodlebug (1997), starring Theobald and co-produced by Thomas.

Filming mainly took place in the London flats of Nolan's friends. The Young Man's flat was Theobald's real-life flat, and the main house seen in the film was Nolan's parents' house. His mother provided sandwiches to the production team as catering. According to Nolan: "The only hitch came when the house was burgled and ironically enough, some of the items which are stolen in one of our fictional burglaries, were stolen in real life", which made certain insert shots impossible to shoot. Additionally, the Bald Guy uses a hammer because a sufficiently realistic gun prop could not be sourced with the budget.

Nolan shot Following with Arri BL and Bolex cameras on 16mm film stock. He chose to shoot in black-and-white to tap into the film noir genre as well as to hide budgetary constraints, reasoning that colour cinematography was harder to achieve on a low budget. He stated that black-and-white cinematography made it quicker and easier to create a stylised look using light and shadow and eliminated the need to match light colour. The handheld "documentary" style camerawork allowed Nolan to be spontaneous in blocking scenes. He employed available light by staging many scenes next to windows. Additionally, Nolan identified the production's limitations in advance and incorporated them into the screenplay. He deliberately staged the opening police station scene in his college's film society using a dolly shot and controlled lighting, which established early on that the film's later use of handheld camerawork was a deliberate stylistic choice rather than the result of inexperience or budgetary constraints.

Following ultimately took fourteen weekends over the course of a year to complete. Nolan called the long production period "a blessing in disguise" as he was able to pay for film stock and processing without getting into debt.

=== Editing ===
Nolan began syncing the film's rushes about six months into filming: "I found a place that was prepared to give me a little time to learn the machines for free, and beyond that I had to start paying for it." Nolan rented a machine for £100 over a weekend, and completed the rough cut over the course of three weekends. He enlisted the help of his university friend Gareth Heal; Nolan and Heal ultimately co-edited the film. Following was originally edited on U-matic tape, and then digitally edited on Avid Media Composer by Heal.

After a screening for cast and crew, the first act of the film was re-edited to play more chronologically. Once Following was accepted to film festivals, Heal and Nolan sought finances to reassemble the edit on a film negative struck from the 16mm film stock. The production team received finishing funds from the Independent Film Channel's Next Wave Films to print the feature on 35 mm film.

== Release ==
Following screened at the 41st San Francisco International Film Festival on 24 April 1998. It was later distributed by Zeitgeist Films.

A Blu-ray and DVD restoration of the film with a new 5.1 sound mix was released by The Criterion Collection for Region A on 11 December 2012. Both the Blu-ray and DVD include a commentary by and an interview with Nolan, a chronological edit of the film, a side-by-side comparison between three scenes of the film and the shooting script, Nolan's 1997 short film Doodlebug, and both the theatrical and re-release trailers. Each edition contains an essay by film critic Scott Foundas, titled "Nolan Begins". Exclusive to the Blu-ray is an uncompressed monaural soundtrack to the film.

== Reception ==
=== Critical response ===
==== Contemporary ====
Following garnered positive critical reception. Los Angeles Times reviewer Kevin Thomas was particularly impressed by the "taut and ingenious neo-noir", stating that "as a psychological mystery it plays persuasively if not profoundly. Nolan relishes the sheer nastiness he keeps stirred up, unabated for 70 minutes." The New Yorker wrote that Following echoed Hitchcock classics but was "leaner and meaner". TV Guide called it "short, sharp and tough as nails", praising its fast-paced storytelling and "tricky, triple-tiered flashback structure." Janet Maslin, in a review for The New York Times, highlighted the film's non-linear structure. David Thompson of Sight and Sound commented that "Nolan shows a natural talent for a fluent handheld aesthetic." Jonathan Romney of New Statesmen praised Nolan's "disorienting" urban depiction of London, and compared his filmmaking to Nicolas Roeg and Chris Petit. Stephen Garrett, writing for IndieWire, called the film a "major highlight" of "inspired drama".

However, Tony Rayns felt that the film's climax was uninspired, saying that "the generic pay off is a little disappointing after the edgy, character based scenes of exposition". Empire's Trevor Lewis questioned the skill of the film's inexperienced cast, saying that they "lack the dramatic ballast to compensate for [Nolan's] erratic plot elisions." Dennis Harvey of Variety felt the British film was compromised by its "Amerindie feel", stating the limited depths of the characters didn't justify its grittiness. He believed its narrative "might work better in a more commercial framework". In contrast, David Thompson was of the opinion that the "unfamiliar cast acquit themselves well in a simple naturalistic style."

==== Retrospective ====
Following received generally positive reviews. The film has an approval rating of 87% on Rotten Tomatoes based on 89 reviews, with an average rating of 7.30/10. The site's critical consensus reads, "Super brief but efficient, Following represents director Christopher Nolan's burgeoning talent in tight filmmaking and hard-edge noir." On Metacritic, the film has a weighted average score of 60 out of 100 based on 11 critics, indicating "mixed or average reviews".

In 2007, filmmaker Joel Schumacher praised Following as the work of a "brilliant" young director. "I always had him in the back of my mind, thinking, 'We're going to hear from this guy, big time.' Then I saw Memento and the promise was fulfilled very fast."

Critics have noted that Following is an early example of Nolan's trademark use of a non-linear plot structure. In 2012, Jim Emerson of RogerEbert.com stated that the film "shows the Nolan we now know almost fully formed". The name Cobb was reused for a character in Nolan's 2010 film Inception. In 2020, Matt Goldberg of Collider noted that Following introduces themes that Nolan would continue to explore in his later films. Siddhant Adlakha of IGN described the film as an early example of Nolan's thematic exploration of obsession and "logic vs impulse". Adlakha wrote that the film's characters evoke classic film noir archetypes, but that the "disorienting narrative" sets Following apart from a typical film noir. He also compared certain scenes to the 1945 film noir Detour and the 1964 James Bond film Goldfinger.

Following has since been recognized as one of the most notable no-budget films of its time. Several members of Following's cast and crew went on to collaborate with Nolan on his later films, such as composer David Julyan, producer Emma Thomas, and actors Jeremy Theobald, John Nolan, and Lucy Russell.

=== Accolades ===
Following won several awards during its festival run, including the Tiger Award at the International Film Festival Rotterdam and the "Best First Feature" prize at the San Francisco International Film Festival, among others. Following also won the Black and White award as well as a Grand Jury Prize nomination at Slamdance Film Festival.
