= The Students of Springfield Street =

- Directed by: Steve Johnson
- Written by: Steve Johnson
- Produced by: Steve Johnson; Margaret Johnson
- Starring: Chris Donald; Amanda Marment; Andreas Munoz; Martin Bell
- Cinematography: Tom Dobbie
- Edited by: Steve Johnson; Nigel Honey
- Music by: Kristofer Muir
- Production company: Futuristfilm
- Release date: 26 June 2015 (US)
- Running time: 94 minutes
- Country: United Kingdom
- Language: English
- Budget: £4,000

The Students of Springfield Street is a 2015 British film written and directed by Steve Johnson. The film marks Johnson's debut as a director and was Shot on RED in Glasgow, Scotland. The film was crowd funded on Bloomvc raising $6,000 to fund the production in just four weeks.

== Plot ==
The Students of Springfield Street follows a 24-hour period in the lives of six friends, depicting how their experiences intersect as they confront issues including debt, illness, substance use, pregnancy, unrequited love, deception, and assault.

== Cast ==
- Chris Donald as Michael
- Amanda Marment as Sarah
- Andreas Munoz as Christiano
- Millie Turner as Jessica
- Alix Austin as Ashley
- Martin Bell as Daniel
- Tanya Van Amse as Bloom

== Release and reception ==
The film was released on 26 June 2015 and had its world premiere at the HoosierDance International Film Festival in the United States. Speaking in the Kokomo Tribune about the film, Martin Slagter wrote:

"The film provides intense and interesting dialogue as each of the friends deal with their own trials including debt, sickness, lies, drugs, pregnancy, love and assault, all through the eyes of director Steve Johnson."

Film review website Indyred wrote:

"The Students of Springfield Street easily earns it's rating based on only two elements, clever writing and some damn fine acting. Mr. Johnson is a master of pretext, giving this movie a reason to "hit rewind" and see what you may have missed."

On 23 October 2015, the film had its UK premiere when it opened the Aberdeen Film Festival. The film proved to be a hit with the festival's jurors who awarded the film the Best Feature accolade. Speaking about his win to Creative Clyde, Johnson said:

"I am proud that our first full-length production has achieved 'Best Picture' recognition. I wanted a film that would spark some discussion over tone, style and the stereotypes surrounding Scottish movies. I wanted The Students of Springfield Street to bring a fresh look at young people and their lives in a very stylised way."

== Awards and nominations ==
Year	Awards	Category	Recipient(s)	Result
2015	Aberdeen Film Festival	Best Feature	Steve Johnson	Won
