= Emma Thomas =

British film producer (born 1971)

Dame Emma Thomas DBE
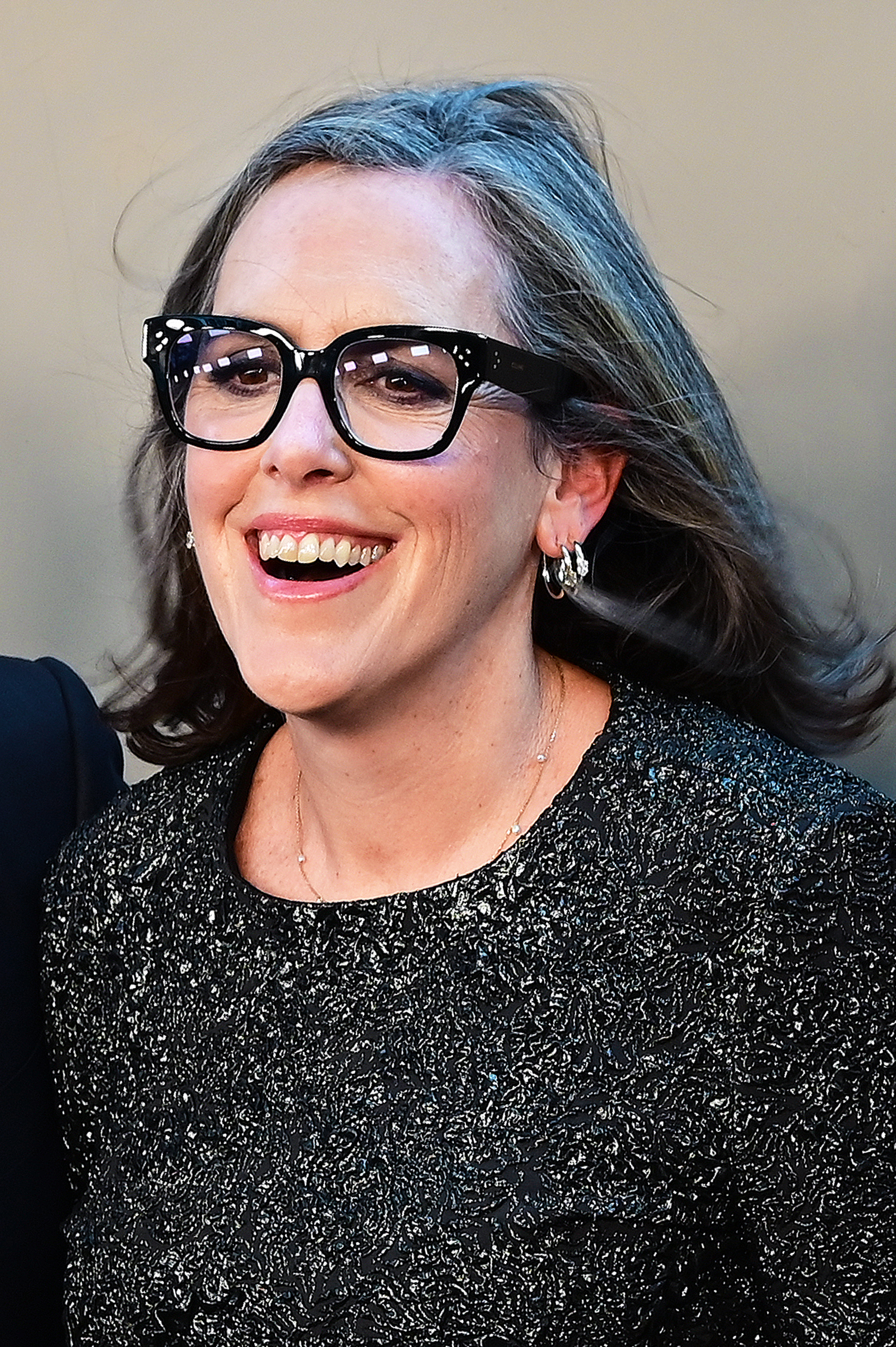
- Thomas in 2026
- Born: 9 December 1971 (age 54); London, England
- Education: University College London (BA)
- Occupation: Film producer
- Years active: 1993–present
- Title: Co-founder and co-owner of Syncopy Inc.
- Spouse: Christopher Nolan (m. 1997)
- Children: 4
- Relatives: Jonathan Nolan (brother-in-law); Lisa Joy (sister-in-law)

Dame Emma Thomas (born 9 December 1971) is a British film producer. She has produced all of the feature films directed by her husband Christopher Nolan, which have grossed more than $7 billion worldwide and are regarded as some of the greatest films of their respective decades.

She received the Academy Award, BAFTA, Golden Globe and Critics' Choice Movie Award for producing Nolan's biographical thriller Oppenheimer (2023), becoming the first British woman to win the Oscar for Best Picture. Thomas received a damehood in 2024 for her contributions to film.

== Early life and education ==
Thomas was born on 9 December 1971 in London. Her father worked in the Civil Service, and she spent part of her childhood living in the Middle East. She originally intended to follow her father into the civil service field after completing her education. Thomas studied ancient history at University College London (UCL). She lived in the same residence hall as filmmaker Christopher Nolan (her boyfriend and future husband), whom she met when she was 18 during their first week at university.

Nolan introduced Thomas to the UCL Union's Film Society, where they arranged feature film screenings in 35mm and used the proceeds to produce newsreels and short films. Thomas credits Nolan and the Film Society for sparking her interest in filmmaking, and would provide refreshments for the crew members of her partner's short films. Upon her graduation from university, she had a "very awkward" conversation with her father in which he tried unsuccessfully to persuade her into working in the Civil Service.

== Career ==
=== 1993–2000: Early career and breakthrough ===
While attending UCL, Thomas completed an unpaid internship with Working Title Films and worked as a runner and a receptionist. After earning her bachelor's degree in ancient history in 1993, she was promoted to production coordinator for the studio. The first film that she produced was the short feature Doodlebug (1997), which depicts a man anxiously trying to kill a bug-like creature in his flat. She and Nolan created the work on 16 mm film during their time at university.

After plans to create a full-length feature, Larry Mahoney, were scrapped, Thomas produced her first feature, Following (1998), with Nolan and Jeremy Theobald, who stars as an unemployed young writer who follows strangers in London in hopes of receiving material for his first novel, but is drawn into a criminal underworld where he fails to keep his distance. The film was conceived on a production budget of around £3,000 (equivalent to £5,823 in 2025) and was filmed on weekends over the course of a year, with scenes being rehearsed extensively to preserve film stock. Following was positively received by film critics and won several awards at various film festivals.

Thomas pitched Nolan's screenplay for their breakthrough film Memento (2000), which follows a man with anterograde amnesia who uses photographs, notes and tattoos to hunt his wife's murderer, to Aaron Ryder of Newmarket Films, who lauded the script. The film was given a budget of $4.5 million (equivalent to $8,400,000 in 2025) and was distributed by Newmarket to 500 theatres in the United States after it was rejected by other studios, who feared that it would not attract a wide audience. Thomas was credited as an associate producer of Memento, which received critical acclaim and several accolades, including two nominations at the 74th Academy Awards. Six critics listed it as one of the best films of the 2000s. She also assisted director Stephen Frears during the production of High Fidelity (2000).

=== 2001–2013: Widespread recognition ===
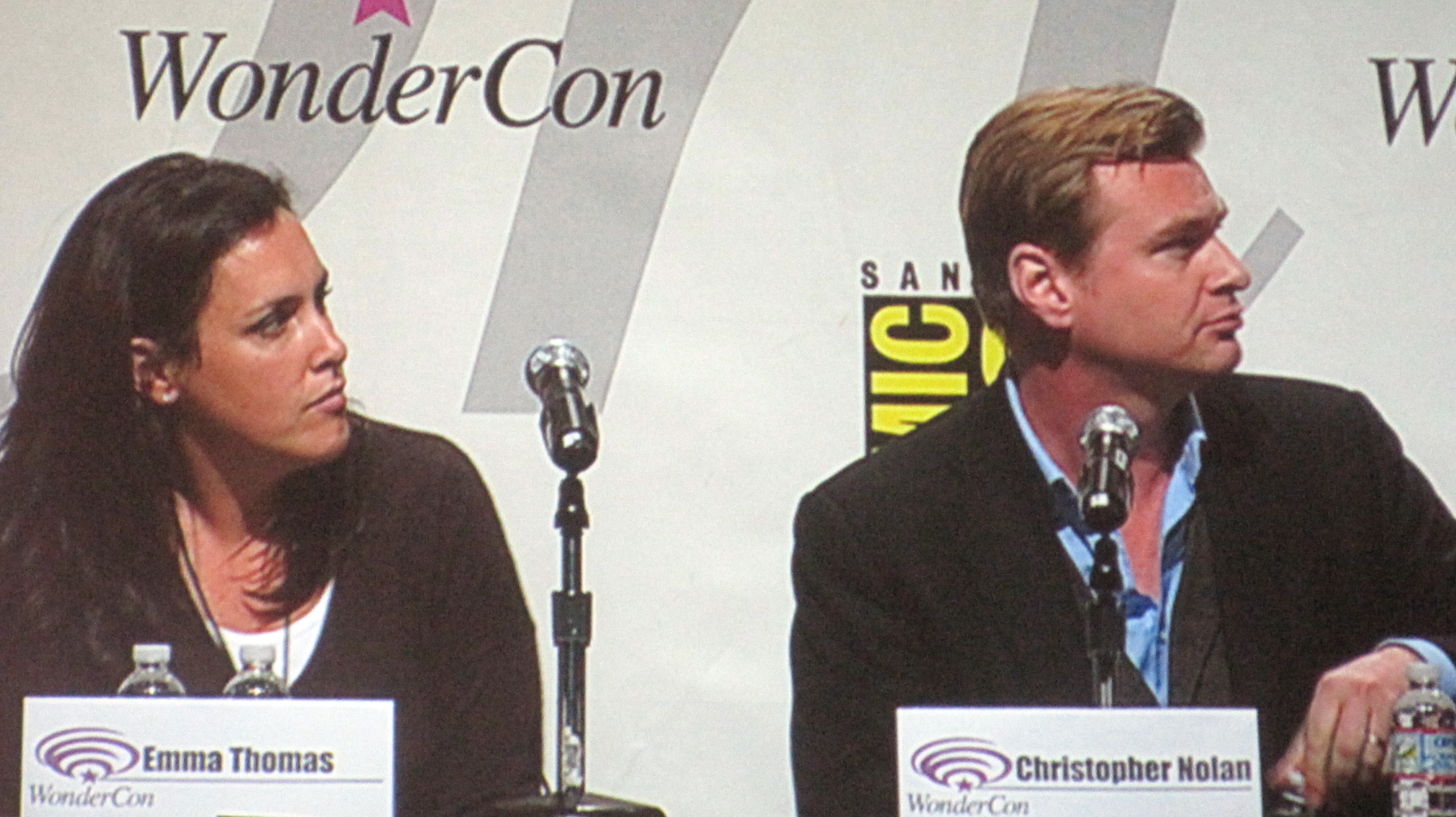
Thomas and her husband Christopher Nolan at WonderCon in 2010.

On 27 February 2001, Thomas and Nolan founded the production company Syncopy Inc. She co-produced the psychological thriller Insomnia (2002), after filmmaker Steven Soderbergh recommended Nolan to Warner Bros. to direct a remake of the 1997 Norwegian thriller of the same name. The film follows two Los Angeles detectives who were sent to investigate the murder of a teenager in a northern Alaskan town. It received positive reviews from critics and grossed $113 million against a budget of $43 million.

Thomas produced the Dark Knight trilogy with Nolan, Charles Roven and Larry Franco; which consisted of Batman Begins (2005), The Dark Knight (2008), and The Dark Knight Rises (2012). Collectively, the films grossed over $2.4 billion worldwide, and is considered to be one of the greatest trilogies ever made. The Dark Knight received eight nominations at the 81st Academy Awards, winning Best Sound Editing for Richard King and Best Supporting Actor; a posthumous accolade for Heath Ledger. The film's failure to capture a Best Picture nomination garnered media criticism, resulting in the Academy of Motion Picture Arts and Sciences increasing their Best Picture nominees from five to ten; a decision coined by the media as "The Dark Knight Rule".

During production of the Dark Knight trilogy, Thomas produced The Prestige (2006), an adaptation of the Christopher Priest novel about two rival 19th-century magicians, and Inception (2010), an original film about a professional thief who steals information by infiltrating the subconscious of his targets. Both films were critically and commercially successful: The Prestige earned over $109 million on a budget of $40 million, despite receiving a bleak box office prognosis, while Inception grossed $839 million worldwide against a budget of $160 million. Thomas received several accolades for her work on the latter film, including nominations for the Academy Award, Golden Globe Award, and BAFTA Award for Best Film. She and Nolan produced Zack Snyder's Man of Steel (2013), which received mixed reviews and grossed more than $660 million worldwide against a budget of $220 million.

=== 2014–2019: Interstellar and Dunkirk ===
Thomas's next feature Interstellar (2014), which she produced with Nolan and Lynda Obst, follows a group of astronauts who travel through a wormhole near Saturn in search of a new home for humankind. It received positive reviews from film critics and was praised by astronauts for its scientific accuracy and portrayal of theoretical astrophysics. Grossing over $730 million worldwide against a budget of $165 million, Interstellar received five nominations at the 87th Academy Awards, winning Best Visual Effects. Earlier in the year, she executive-produced Wally Pfister's directorial debut Transcendence. Through her production company, Thomas formed a joint venture with Zeitgeist Films to release Blu-ray versions of Elena (2011) and a compilation of animated short films by the Quay brothers. She serves on the Motion Picture & Television Fund board of directors.

After executive producing Zack Snyder's Batman v Superman: Dawn of Justice (2016) and Justice League (2017), Thomas produced the historical war film Dunkirk (2017), which depicts the World War II evacuation of the same name from the perspectives of the land, sea, and air. She and her husband were first interested in creating the film after taking an "ill-fated" sailing trip across the English Channel about twenty years prior, which "very much cemented for us what an incredible achievement that evacuation was". The film received critical acclaim and grossed $526 million worldwide against a budget of around $82.5–150 million, (Note: Thomas believes that Dunkirk's production budget was around the same as Interstellar's—$165 million. Conflicting reports suggest that the film's budget was between $120 million to $150 million.) becoming the highest-grossing World War II film at the time. Among Dunkirk's many accolades, Thomas earned her second Oscar nomination for Best Picture. A year later, she and Nolan executive produced the Quay brothers' animated short The Doll's Breath (2019). She was appointed to the board of trustees for the Academy Museum of Motion Pictures.

=== 2020–present: Tenet, Oppenheimer and The Odyssey ===
Tenet (2020), Thomas's next feature, follows an unnamed protagonist who travels through time to prevent a world-threatening attack. The film was the first Hollywood tent-pole to open in theatres during the COVID-19 pandemic; it was delayed three times before premiering due to the pandemic. Despite failing to break-even, Tenet grossed $363 million worldwide on a budget of $200 million. It was a polarising screening for film critics; USA Today's Jenna Ryu and the Los Angeles Times' Christi Carras both described the overall tone of the reviews as "mixed" and "all over the place". The film won Best Visual Effects and was nominated for Best Production Design at the 93rd Academy Awards. Following the release of Tenet, Thomas served as an executive producer on Zack Snyder's Justice League (2021), a director's cut of 2017's Justice League.

Thomas's twelfth film, Oppenheimer (2023), is a biographical thriller centred around the career of theoretical physicist J. Robert Oppenheimer and his involvement in the creation of the first nuclear weapons. It marked her and her husband's first film to receive an R-rating in the United States since Insomnia, and their first to be financed and distributed through Universal Pictures, following a public dispute between Nolan and Warner Bros. Thomas considers Oppenheimer to be her and Nolan's "riskiest" film to date, explaining that she "didn't feel there was a guaranteed audience for this film. I hoped people would feel they needed to see it in theaters, but many people still weren't back post-COVID. And there's the fact we've heard nothing but 'theaters are over' for a while now. So it wasn't a no-brainer. Not only did it feel like it was a risky film to make, it felt like the stakes had never been higher". Oppenheimer was filmed on a 57-day shooting schedule with a production budget of $100 million, which Thomas liked because it kept their work fresh. It was met with widespread critical acclaim and grossed over $950 million worldwide, becoming the highest-grossing biographical film; it also surpassed Dunkirk as the highest-grossing World War II-related film of all time. Oppenheimer won many accolades, including top honours at the 96th Academy Awards, the 77th British Academy Film Awards, and the 81st Golden Globe Awards. Thomas is the first British female producer to win the Oscar for Best Picture.

== Personal life ==
Thomas married Christopher Nolan in 1997. The couple have four children and reside in Los Angeles. Thomas and Nolan were included in the Sunday Times Rich List of 2025 with an estimated net worth of £360 million.

== Recognition ==
Described as a "dream producer for both talent and studio" by Variety, Thomas' production sets are "notoriously harmonious", as they have consistently wrapped on schedule and on budget. Vanity Fair considers her to be her husband's "consigliere", while Robbie Collin of The Telegraph regards her as the "driving force" behind the success of "cinema's most formidable power couple". Thomas has also been praised by her frequent collaborators. Cillian Murphy, who has appeared in six of her films, described her relationship with Nolan as "the most dynamic, decent, [and] kindest producer–director partnership in Hollywood". Film editor Jennifer Lame was "in awe" at Thomas and called her an "unflappable" and "badass producer" who creates "complicated, beautiful films".

Thomas was named an honorary fellow of UCL in 2013. She and Nolan were given the Spirit of the Industry Award from the National Association of Theatre Owners (NATO) in 2023 for making films that "shatter the limits of what cinematic storytelling can achieve, maintaining a shared passion and commitment to the theatrical filmgoing experience that is unwavering and unparalleled". John Fithian, former president of NATO, hailed the duo as "two champions of cinema" and said "no one has done more to advance the theatrical experience" than them. At the same time as Nolan was knighted, Thomas was appointed Dame Commander of the Order of the British Empire (DBE) for services to film.

== Filmography ==
- Doodlebug (1997)
- Following (1998)
- Memento (2000) (as associate producer)
- Insomnia (2002) (as co-producer)
- Batman Begins (2005)
- The Prestige (2006)
- The Dark Knight (2008)
- Inception (2010)
- The Dark Knight Rises (2012)
- Man of Steel (2013)
- Interstellar (2014)
- Dunkirk (2017)
- Tenet (2020)
- Oppenheimer (2023)
- The Odyssey (2026)

== Accolades ==
| Organisations | Year (Note: Indicates the year of ceremony. Each year is linked to the article about the awards held that year, wherever possible.) | Category | Work | Result |
|---|---|---|---|---|
| Academy Awards | 2011 | Best Picture | Inception | Nominated |
| Academy Awards | 2018 | Best Picture | Dunkirk | Nominated |
| Academy Awards | 2024 | Best Picture | Oppenheimer | Won |
| BAFTA Awards | 2011 | Best Film | Inception | Nominated |
| BAFTA Awards | 2018 | Best Film | Dunkirk | Nominated |
| BAFTA Awards | 2024 | Best Film | Oppenheimer | Won |
| Golden Globe Awards | 2011 | Best Motion Picture – Drama | Inception | Nominated |
| Golden Globe Awards | 2018 | Best Motion Picture – Drama | Dunkirk | Nominated |
| Golden Globe Awards | 2024 | Best Motion Picture – Drama | Oppenheimer | Won |
| Golden Globe Awards | 2024 | Best Cinematic and Box Office Achievement – Motion Picture | Oppenheimer | Nominated |
| Producers Guild Awards | 2009 | Outstanding Production of the Year – Motion Picture | The Dark Knight | Nominated |
| Producers Guild Awards | 2011 | Outstanding Production of the Year – Motion Picture | Inception | Nominated |
| Producers Guild Awards | 2018 | Outstanding Production of the Year – Motion Picture | Dunkirk | Nominated |
| Producers Guild Awards | 2024 | Outstanding Production of the Year – Motion Picture | Oppenheimer | Won |
