= Stalker (2022 film) =

- Directed by: Steve Johnson
- Written by: Chris Watt
- Produced by: Stuart Brennan
- Starring: Stuart Brennan; Sophie Skelton
- Cinematography: Simon Stolland
- Edited by: Mark Paul Wake
- Music by: George Hinson
- Production company: Stronnghold
- Distributed by: Kaleidoscope; Gravitas Ventures
- Release dates: 28 August 2022 (FrightFest); 10 October 2022
- Running time: 93 minutes
- Country: United Kingdom
- Language: English

Stalker is a 2022 British horror thriller film directed by Steve Johnson, starring Stuart Brennan and Sophie Skelton.

== Cast ==
- Stuart Brennan as Daniel Reed
- Sophie Skelton as Rose Hepburn
- Bret Hart as Grant

== Release ==
The film premiered at FrightFest on 28 August 2022. It was released to DVD and digital on 10 October. The film was released in theatres on 31 March 2023.

== Reception ==
On Rotten Tomatoes, the film has an approval rating of 80% based on 10 reviews.

Crockett Houghton of Film Inquiry praised the script and the performances of Brennan and Skelton.

Film critic Kim Newman wrote that the film "does well to keep the interest up in a necessarily static situation, with both leads grandstanding when necessary – then underplaying to take the edge off the melodrama."

Martin Unsworth of Starburst rated the film 3 stars out of 5 and wrote that Johnson "ramps the tension, creating a claustrophobic atmosphere that builds to a dramatic conclusion." Walker also praised the performances Brennan and Skelton, writing that they are "believable in their roles."

Cath Clarke of The Guardian rated the film 2 stars out of 5 and criticised the lack of claustrophobia and the final twist, which felt "like a disturbingly misogynist move."
