= Convergence (2019 film) =

- Film poster
- Directed by: Steve Johnson
- Written by: Steve Johnson
- Produced by: Steve Johnson; Margaret Johnson; Jeremy Theobald; Barry Gunning
- Starring: Jeremy Theobald; Nicolette McKeown; Lee Fanning; Alfie Wellcoat
- Cinematography: Steve Johnson
- Edited by: Steve Johnson
- Music by: Paul Wilkie
- Production company: Futurist Film
- Release date: 11 May 2019
- Running time: 97 minutes
- Country: United Kingdom
- Language: English

Convergence is a 2019 feature film from English director Steve Johnson.

== Plot ==
Struggling after the death of his wife and child in a car crash, successful writer Martin starts to question the circumstances of the accident after an encounter with a grieving mother at a bereavement group. Who is the mysterious character in the photographs and why can't he shake the feeling that he's being played?

== Main cast ==
- Jeremy Theobald as Martin
- Nicolette McKeown as Lily
- Lee Fanning as Dominic
- Alfie Wellcoat as Robert
- Anna Kennedy as Maggie
- Jemima Spence as Christina
- Marcus Macleod as The Strategist

== Release and reception ==
The film premiered at the British Independent Film Festival on 11 May 2019 in Leicester Square, London. The film had a limited UK theatrical release in Cineworld cinemas and was given a 15 certificate by the British Board of Film Classification. The film was widely praised by critics. In the United Kingdom, UK Film Review said:

"For a film dealing with numerous angsty themes, Johnson does supremely well to explore them in a manner that feels controlled and minimalist. Whilst there are sequences where the drama explodes on screen, such as Lily talking about her childhood or grappling with her ex, the majority of the film feels like a contemplative piece where the viewer is palpably experiencing the grief and distress of the two central characters. A large part of this is due to the character of Martin and the understated performance from Theobald."

In the United States, Film Threat wrote:

"The gorgeous cinematography lends a dream-like quality to everything, so Convergence is an absolute stunner to watch. Johnson balances the magical realism at play with the grounded drama the leads are going through with confidence, so neither overpowers the other."

== Awards ==
Year	Awards	Category	Recipient(s)	Result
2019	Antakya Film Festival	Special Jury Award	Steve Johnson	Won
2019	Antakya Film Festival	Best International Feature Film	Steve Johnson	Nominated
2019	British Independent Film Festival	Best Feature Film	Steve Johnson	Won
2019	British Independent Film Festival	Best Actor	Jeremy Theobald	Nominated
2019	British Independent Film Festival	Best Supporting Actress	Nicolette McKeown	Nominated
2019	British Independent Film Festival	Best Cinematography	Steve Johnson	Nominated
2019	British Independent Film Festival	Best Supporting Actor	Alfie Wellcoat	Nominated
2019	New Directors Hollywood Showcase	Best Feature Film	Steve Johnson	Nominated
2019	Cardiff International Film Festival	Best Feature Film	Steve Johnson	Won
2019	LA Edge Film Awards	Best Narrative Feature Film	Steve Johnson	Won
2019	LA Edge Film Awards	Best Director	Steve Johnson	Won
2019	LA Edge Film Awards	Best Cinematography	Steve Johnson	Won
2019	LA Edge Film Awards	Best Editing	Steve Johnson	Won
2019	LA Edge Film Awards	Best Actor	Jeremy Theobald	Won
2019	LA Edge Film Awards	Best Actress	Nicolette McKeown	Won
2019	LA Edge Film Awards	Best Composer	Paul Wilkie	Won
2019	Los Angeles Theatrical Release Competition & Awards	Best Director (Features US & International)	Steve Johnson	Won
2019	Los Angeles Theatrical Release Competition & Awards	Best Cinematography (Features - US & International)	Steve Johnson	Won
2019	United States Film Festival	Best International Feature Film	Steve Johnson	Won
2019	United States Film Festival	Best Cinematography	Steve Johnson	Won
2019	United States Film Festival	Best Actor	Jeremy Theobald	Won
2019	Skiptown International Film Festival	Best Supporting Actress	Nicolette McKeown	Won
2019	Skiptown International Film Festival	Best Feature Film	Steve Johnson	Nominated
2019	Skiptown International Film Festival	Best Original Screenplay	Steve Johnson	Nominated
2019	Skiptown International Film Festival	Best Original Score	Paul Wilkie	Nominated
2019	European Cinematography Awards	Best Lead Acting	Jeremy Theobald	Won
2019	European Cinematography Awards	Best Supporting Acting	Nicolette McKeown	Won
2020	London International Motion Picture Awards	Best Feature Film	Steve Johnson	Nominated
2020	London International Motion Picture Awards	Best Director	Steve Johnson	Nominated
2020	London International Motion Picture Awards	Best Cinematography	Steve Johnson	Nominated
2020	London International Motion Picture Awards	Best Actor	Jeremy Theobald	Nominated
2020	London International Motion Picture Awards	Best Actress	Nicolette McKeown	Nominated
