= Doodlebug (film) =

1997 short film by Christopher Nolan

- Official logo
- Directed by: Christopher Nolan
- Written by: Christopher Nolan
- Produced by: Emma Thomas; Christopher Nolan; Steve Street
- Starring: Jeremy Theobald
- Cinematography: Christopher Nolan
- Edited by: Christopher Nolan
- Music by: David Julyan
- Distributed by: Alliance Atlantis
- Release date: 1997
- Running time: 3 minutes
- Country: United Kingdom
- Language: English

Doodlebug is a 1997 short psychological thriller film written and directed by Christopher Nolan. It follows the story of a man anxiously trying to kill a bug-like creature in his flat. Nolan created the film during his university days using 16 mm film. The film was met with a generally positive critical response.

== Plot ==
The story concerns a dishevelled man in a filthy flat. He is anxious and paranoid, trying to kill a small bug-like creature that is scurrying on the floor. It is revealed that the bug resembles a miniature version of himself, with every movement it makes being later matched by the man himself. He crushes the bug with his shoe but is subsequently squashed by a larger version of himself.

== Production ==
Doodlebug was written, directed, shot and edited by Christopher Nolan. He had written the script while studying English literature at University College London (UCL). The three-minute short was filmed on a negligible budget in 1997 using black-and-white 16mm film. Nolan shot the film over a weekend, a technique he used the following year with his first full-length release Following, with two or three-minute excerpts being shot over the two days. He co-produced the short film with his future wife and collaborator Emma Thomas, while Jeremy Theobald, his friend from university who would also star in Following, was cast as the paranoid man. It was scored by David Julyan, a friend of Nolan's from the UCL's student film society, who would go on to compose the soundtrack a number of the director's later films. Nolan explored the idea of multiple dimensions in its plot: in an interview with The Daily Beast, he opined that "films are uniquely suited towards addressing paradox, recursiveness, and worlds-within-worlds," and further cited the works M. C. Escher and Jorge Luis Borges as influences in this domain. The film has been described as Kafkaesque psychological thriller.

== Reception ==
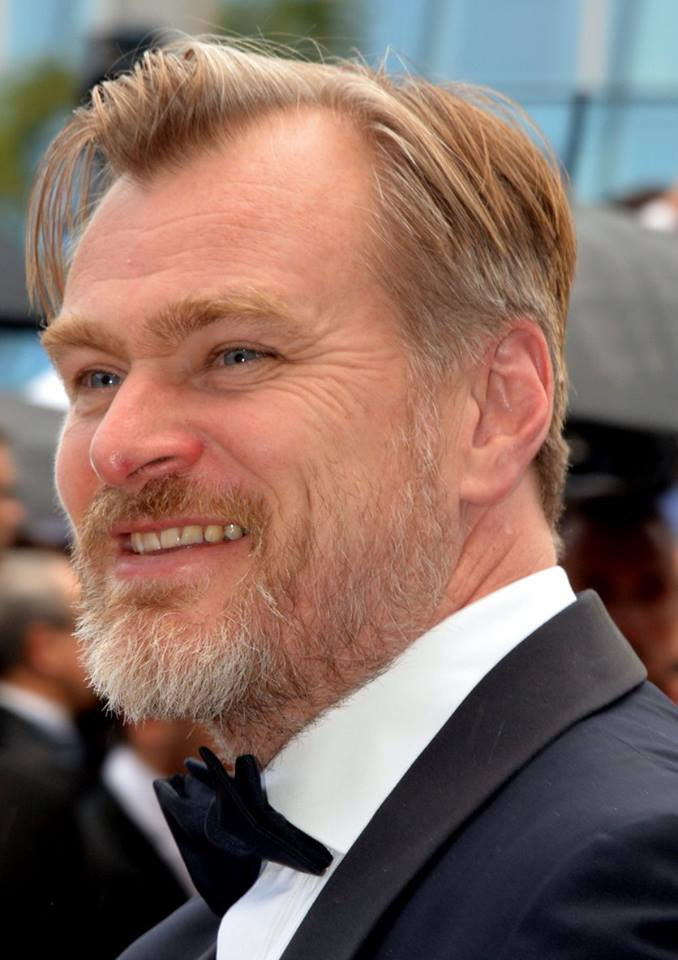
Christopher Nolan in 2018

Doodlebug was met with generally positive reviews. Christopher Hooton of The Independent deemed it "a fairly unremarkable student film," but considered this to be a "great" thing since "it shows that Nolan was not a master from the second he first got his hands on a 16mm camera but, crucially, kept at it, kept learning and incrementally amassed an impressive set of cinematic skills that put him in command of huge budgets that allow him to fully achieve his vision". Sammy Nickalls, writing for Esquire, expressed the same sentiment, further adding that while "it's certainly no Interstellar, it's filled with Nolan's flair, from his gravitation toward black and white to his abstract imagery." PopMatters' Jose Solis characterised the short film as "playful" and Following's "most charming bonus feature." Simon Reynolds of Digital Spy listed it among nine "incredible" short films by renowned directors. Film School Rejects' H. Perry Horton claimed that Nolan "has been one of the most intriguing and intelligent filmmakers working since the first frame of Doodlebug." The Daily Telegraph opined that it "displayed Christopher Nolan's talent for constructing unsettling narratives early on".
