= Larceny (1996 film) =

1996 film by Christopher Nolan

- Directed by: Christopher Nolan
- Written by: Christopher Nolan
- Produced by: Ivan Cornell; Christopher Nolan
- Starring: Mark Deighton; Dave Savva; Jeremy Theobald
- Cinematography: Christopher Nolan
- Edited by: Christopher Nolan
- Music by: David Julyan
- Production company: UCL Film Society
- Distributed by: Bloomsbury Films
- Release date: July 1996 (UK)
- Running time: 8–9 minutes
- Country: United Kingdom
- Language: English

Larceny is an unreleased 1996 short film written, directed, and edited by Christopher Nolan. The film is a little over eight minutes long and involves an apartment burglary.

== Plot ==
A man who pick-pockets people gets chased through the woods by the people he's trying to steal from.

== Cast ==
- Jeremy Theobald – The Man
- Mark Deighton – Toby
- Dave Savva – Wooly Hat

== Production ==
Nolan shot the film over a weekend in black and white with limited equipment and a small cast and crew. It was funded by Nolan and shot with equipment, specifically with 16-millimeter cameras, from the film society of the students' union of University College London (UCL). The society describes the film as "one of the best (if not the best) shorts of filmsec recent generations".

== Release ==
It was screened at the Cambridge Film Festival in 1996 but has not been made public since. David Julyan, who made the music for the film, said in 2024 that he had a VHS copy of it.
