= Gary Fettis =

American set decorator

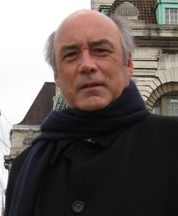
- Born: 1950 (age 75–76)
- Occupation: Set decorator
- Years active: 1982-present

Gary Fettis (born 1950) is an American set decorator. He has been nominated for four Academy Awards in the category Best Art Direction.

== Selected filmography ==
- The Godfather Part III (1990)
- Changeling (2008)
- Interstellar (2014)
- Dunkirk (2017)
