= Jeremy Theobald =

British actor

- Born: United Kingdom
- Occupations: Actor, editor

Jeremy Theobald is a British actor best known for his portrayal of "The Young Man", the main character in Christopher Nolan's 1998 major picture debut Following, and for which Theobald was also a producer. Filming was scheduled around their day jobs. Jonathan Romney, writing in the New Statesman, noted that "Nolan and his cast are terrific finds: I wouldn't normally say this to struggling artists, but they might want to give up their day jobs."

Theobald also appeared in Larceny, a short film shot by Nolan while in the UCLU Film Society, and Doodlebug, another short film by Nolan. Theobald also had a small role as the "Younger Gotham Water Board Technician" in the Nolan feature Batman Begins. As with many British actors, he has also had a part in an episode of ITV's The Bill.

== Filmography ==
=== Film ===
Year	Title	Role	Notes
1998	Following	The Young Man	also Producer
2005	Batman Begins	Younger Gotham Water Board Technician	
2018	Convergence	Martin	also Producer
2020	Tenet	Steward	
