= Sanatorium Under the Sign of the Hourglass (film) =

2024 animated film

- Official release poster
- Directed by: Stephen Quay; Timothy Quay
- Written by: Stephen Quay; Timothy Quay
- Based on: Sanatorium Under the Sign of the Hourglass by Bruno Schulz
- Produced by: Lucie Conrad; Izabella Kiszka-Hoflik
- Starring: Tadeusz Janiszewski; Wioletta Kopańska; Andrzej Kłak; Allison Bell; Zenaida Yanowsky
- Cinematography: Bartosz Bieniek
- Edited by: Stephen Quay; Timothy Quay
- Music by: Timothy Nelson
- Production companies: British Film Institute; Telewizja Polska S.A.; Koninck Studios; SpK Galicia Limited; IKH Pictures Production; The Match Factory
- Distributed by: KimStim
- Release dates: 29 August 2024 (Venice); 11 April 2025 (Poland); 29 August 2025 (New York City)
- Running time: 76 minutes
- Countries: Poland; United Kingdom; United States
- Language: Polish

Sanatorium Under the Sign of the Hourglass is a 2024 live-action/adult animated hybrid independent fantasy drama film written and directed by Stephen and Timothy Quay. Based on the 1937 novel by Bruno Schulz, the film follows Jozef as he experiences fragmented and dreamlike scenarios at a remote Galician sanatorium. It is the third feature-length film by the Brothers Quay and their first feature-length film in nearly two decades. Starring Tadeusz Janiszewski, Wioletta Kopańska, Andrzej Kłak, Allison Bell, and Zenaida Yanowsky, the film premiered in the "Giornate degli Autori" section at the 81st Venice International Film Festival on 29 August 2024, and was theatrically released in the Film Forum theatre in New York City on 29 August 2025, by KimStim.

== Premise ==
Jozef embarks on a journey via a ghostly train to visit his dying father in a remote Galician sanatorium. Upon arrival, he discovers that the sanatorium exists in a realm where time is distorted—his father's death has not yet occurred, as time here lags behind the outside world by an undefined interval. Jozef's experiences become increasingly fragmented and dreamlike as he confronts various manifestations of his father, each representing different aspects of their relationship and his own psyche.

== Cast ==
- Tadeusz Janiszewski as Auctioneer
- Wioletta Kopańska as Adele II
- Andrzej Kłak as Chimney swiper
- Allison Bell
- Zenaida Yanowsky

== Production ==
=== Development and casting ===
Sanatorium Under the Sign of the Hourglass is the third feature-length film from Stephen and Timothy Quay, after Institute Benjamenta, or This Dream People Call Human Life (1995) and The Piano Tuner of Earthquakes (2005). The film is shot in the Polish language, with a cast that includes Tadeusz Janiszewski, Wioletta Kopańska, Andrzej Kłak, Allison Bell, and Zenaida Yanowsky. Yanowsky previously starred in the Quay Brothers' dance films The Sandman (2000) and Eurydice: She, So Beloved (2007). Based on the 1937 novel of the same name by Bruno Schulz, the film mixes live-action with stop-motion animation. The novel was previously adapted for the film The Hourglass Sanatorium (1973), written and directed by Wojciech Jerzy Has. The Quay Brothers had previously adapted Schulz's work for their short film Street of Crocodiles (1986). Christopher Nolan served as an executive producer and presenter on Sanatorium Under the Sign of the Hourglass. He had previously written and directed a documentary short about the Quay Brothers, titled Quay (2015), and executive produced their short film The Doll's Breath (2019).

=== Music ===
Timothy Nelson served as the film's composer, having previously scored several short films for the Quay Brothers. Work on the soundtrack began in 2007 and was released on 19 November 2024, in four separate volumes.

Always Night Here (Music Inspired by the Writings & Drawings of Bruno Schulz, Volume One)
No.	Title	Length
1.	"Labrynthine"	2:56
2.	"Swollen-Faced Railwayman"	1:13
3.	"Last Breath"	0:35
4.	"Consolation of Colours"	2:39
5.	"It Is Never Night Here"	2:10
6.	"A Certain Interval of Time"	2:39
7.	"At the Mercy of Draughts"	2:41
8.	"Telescope"	2:10
9.	"Still More Tarts"	1:24
10.	"Black Fern"	4:48
11.	"Secondhand Time"	2:46
12.	"Bookbinder"	3:31
13.	"Rubbish and Straw"	3:58
14.	"Empty Landscapes of Sleep"	4:16
15.	"Blue Flame"	2:32
16.	"Asleep Again"	3:52
17.	"Arms of Morpheus"	3:56
18.	"Chalk (Corridor 1)"	3:00
19.	"Bottle Glass"	4:05
20.	"Grope (Corridor 2)"	2:45
21.	"Musk"	2:05
22.	"Dust (Corridor 3)"	1:21
23.	"It Is Always Night Here"	4:16
Total length:		65:40

Ghost Print Of It (Music Inspired by the Writings & Drawings of Bruno Schulz, Volume Two)
No.	Title	Length
1.	"Spore (Corridor 4)"	1:54
2.	"Mote (Corridor 5)"	1:16
3.	"Dusk"	4:16
4.	"Ghost Print of It (Corridor 6)"	1:16
5.	"In Negative (Corridor 7)"	1:16
6.	"Asphodel"	4:40
7.	"Meteorologia (Corridor 8)"	1:23
8.	"Through Mourning Crepe"	2:34
9.	"Shimmer (Corridor 9)"	0:48
10.	"Magnetique"	4:56
11.	"Bell Jar"	2:37
12.	"Shadow (Corridor 10)"	2:37
13.	"Twilight (Corridor 11)"	3:56
14.	"Transom"	6:24
15.	"Skylight"	2:37
16.	"Bianca mit Streichern"	4:45
17.	"Luna"	3:36
18.	"Spectra (Corridor 12)"	1:35
19.	"Thirteenth Month (Corridor 13)"	4:08
20.	"Headlights"	4:17
21.	"Penumbra (Corridor 14)"	2:13
22.	"Microscope"	3:39
23.	"Bianca's Jumprope"	2:31
Total length:		69:14

Nest Upended (Music Inspired by the Writings & Drawings of Bruno Schulz, Volume Three)
No.	Title	Length
1.	"Ciemny"	4:44
2.	"Strefa"	4:02
3.	"Wiatr"	2:36
4.	"Windpipe"	3:38
5.	"Synchro"	3:37
6.	"Nest Upended"	4:10
7.	"Windowsill Choir"	3:16
8.	"Jaśnieć"	4:16
9.	"Inkubator"	4:02
10.	"Pileus"	3:01
11.	"Blask"	4:24
12.	"She Sits on the Passenger Seat, Tuning the Radio With Her Feet"	2:51
13.	"Used Chalk"	5:21
14.	"Undula"	2:22
15.	"Another Russian Racehorse"	2:40
16.	"Slipper"	1:29
17.	"Radiogramma"	0:13
18.	"Nearly Naked"	2:17
19.	"Waterbed"	1:20
20.	"Meteorological"	2:28
Total length:		62:47

Slowly Rising Swallow (Music Inspired by the Writings & Drawings of Bruno Schulz, Volume Four)
No.	Title	Length
1.	"Unstuck"	1:44
2.	"Lungs"	2:08
3.	"Naked"	2:34
4.	"Ptaszek"	1:09
5.	"Lowdown Dirty"	2:27
6.	"Slowly Rising Swallow"	1:17
7.	"The Swallow's Appendage"	2:50
8.	"...and Thus, He Became a Criminal"	3:14
9.	"Under the Ground Beneath the Derricks"	1:47
10.	"Always Deep Here Too"	1:46
11.	"Untranslatable"	1:41
12.	"Lumbitor (KE 80)"	1:51
13.	"Nocte in Perpetuam"	1:55
14.	"Nothing Runs Like a Deere"	3:18
15.	"Miss "X" (KE 87)"	2:04
16.	"Other"	2:08
17.	"Paluba"	2:34
18.	"Unbuttoned More Slowly"	1:13
19.	"Still Wroughten"	4:10
20.	"Up at the Very Top of the Derricks"	1:53
21.	"But Not Completely So"	2:07
22.	"Debauched Electrical Band"	3:32
23.	"Always Even Deeper"	3:14
24.	"Alicia Redux 3"	1:55
25.	"Alicia Redux 9"	2:21
26.	"Never Ever Vibes Here"	1:09
27.	"Always Vibes Here"	1:24
28.	"Młotki 2"	0:42
29.	"Celeste"	0:42
30.	"Splet"	0:37
31.	"Wound"	0:59
32.	"Ohilikethat"	0:12
33.	"Gwizdek 5"	0:47
34.	"Triple Chin"	0:49
35.	"The Debased Parade"	2:13
Total length:		66:26

== Release ==
Sanatorium Under the Sign of the Hourglass had its world premiere in the "Giornate degli Autori" section at the 81st Venice International Film Festival on 29 August 2024. It also played at the 57th Sitges Film Festival, the BFI London Film Festival, the Thessaloniki International Film Festival, the Taipei Golden Horse Film Festival, the 55th International Film Festival of India, the Göteborg Film Festival, the 54th International Film Festival Rotterdam, the Timeless Film Festival Warsaw, the 49th Hong Kong International Film Festival, the Jeonju International Film Festival, the 2025 Seattle International Film Festival, the Melbourne International Film Festival, the Helsinki International Film Festival, and the Polish Film Festival. (Note: Attributed to multiple sources:) In March 2025, the film played during the "Dormitorium – The Film Décors of The Quay Brothers" exhibition, at Bloomsbury's Swedenborg House, as part of the 23rd Polish Film Festival.

The film had a limited theatrical release on 11 April 2025 in Poland and on 12 July 2025 in Japan. It was theatrically released in the Film Forum theatre in New York City on 29 August 2025, by KimStim. The theater previously hosted the world premiere of Quay, Nolan's documentary short film about the Brothers Quay.

== Reception ==
=== Critical response ===
On the review aggregator website Rotten Tomatoes, 82% of 17 critics' reviews are positive. Metacritic, which uses a weighted average, assigned the film a score of 78 out of 100, based on 4 critics, indicating "generally favorable" reviews.

Guy Lodge of Variety gave a positive review, writing "Seductive and confounding in equal measure, the Quays' latest is enough of a trip that our world looks a little stranger when the lights come up and we emerge, blearily blinking, back into it". Tim Grierson of Screen Daily also gave a positive review, summarizing that it is "a transporting, ghostly affair. The Quay Brothers' trademark stop-motion animation is as haunting as ever, the delicate, banged-up puppets suggesting the characters' emotional fragility and buried pains". Roberto Oggiano of Cineuropa similarly praised the film's "world that the Quay brothers have built is one so ethereal and elusive that, paradoxically, it is destined to last, in this confused mass of memories we call cinema". Geoff Andrew gave a positive review of the film's puppetry, praising "the fantastic, enigmatic tableaux of grotesque characters (some more or less human, some not at all, some impressively weird hybrids) ... such is the meticulous, almost absurdly detailed assemblage of the hand-crafted figures in their likewise painstakingly hand-crafted landscapes that one is overtaken by a strange sense of life not extinguished but temporarily put on pause" Steve Kopian of Unseen Films praised the film's music, writing "This has to be one of the greatest marriages of image and music that has ever been put on film. Rarely has any film used music so perfectly from start to finish. Neither lifts more than the other and the result is an emotional punch that leaves us haunted at the end."

=== Accolades ===
The film was nominated at the 81st Venice International Film Festival for the "Giornate degli Autori Director's Award". It was also the runner-up for the 2024 International Cinephile Society award for "Best Animated Film", but lost to Gints Zilbalodis' Flow (2024).

== See also ==
- The Hourglass Sanatorium, a 1973 film directed by Wojciech Jerzy Has, based on the same novel
