= Christopher Nolan filmography =

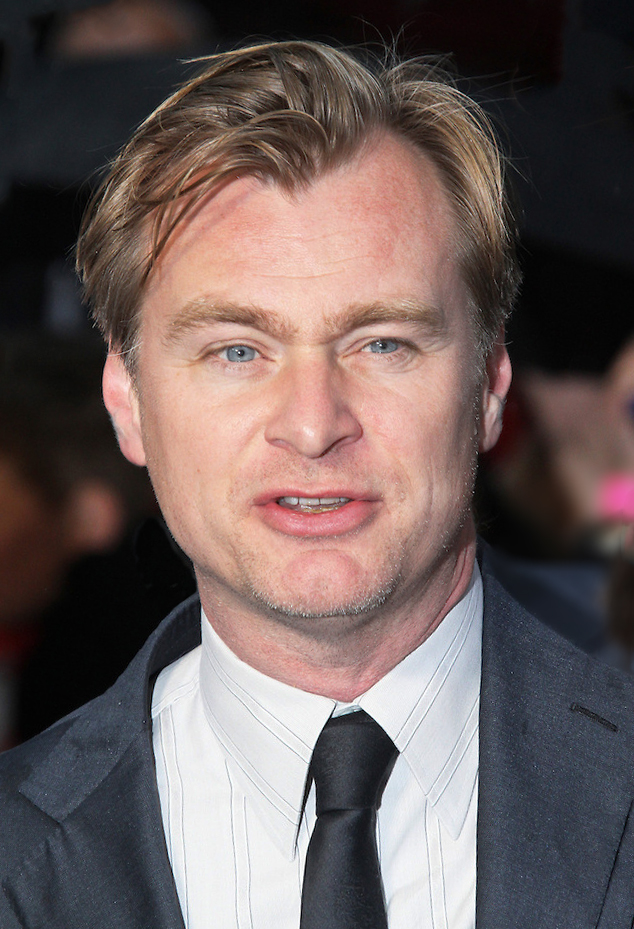
Nolan at the 2013 premiere of Man of Steel

Sir Christopher Nolan is a British and American film director, screenwriter, and film producer. His feature directorial debut was the neo-noir crime thriller Following (1998) which was made on a budget of $6,000. (Note: Nolan directed a feature, Larry Mahoney, in the mid-1990s, but it was scrapped and never released.) Two years later, he directed the psychological thriller Memento (2000) which starred Guy Pearce as a man suffering from anterograde amnesia (short-term memory loss) searching for his wife's killer. Similar to his debut feature, this film had a non-linear narrative structure. It served as his breakthrough film. It was acclaimed by critics and was a surprise commercial success. For the film Nolan received his first nomination for the Directors Guild of America Award for Outstanding Directing – Feature Film, and for writing its screenplay he was nominated for the Academy Award for Best Original Screenplay. He next directed the mystery thriller remake Insomnia (2002) which starred Al Pacino, Robin Williams, and Hilary Swank. It was his first film for Warner Bros., and was a critical and commercial success.

In 2005, Nolan directed Warner Bros' superhero film Batman Begins which starred Christian Bale and told an origin story of the title character. The following year, he directed psychological thriller The Prestige (2006) in which Bale and Hugh Jackman played rival 19th-century stage magicians. His next film was the sequel to Batman Begins, The Dark Knight, in which Bale reprised his role as Batman opposite Heath Ledger as the Joker. The film grossed a worldwide total of over $1 billion, and was the highest grossing of 2008. It received eight nominations at the 81st Academy Awards, and Nolan received his second nomination at the Directors Guild of America Awards. In 2010, he directed the action film Inception starring Leonardo DiCaprio as a thief who leads a team who steal information by entering a person's subconscious. It was nominated for Best Film at the Academy Awards, British Academy Film Awards, and Golden Globe Awards, and Nolan received his third nomination at the Directors Guild of America Awards.

Two years later, he directed The Dark Knight Rises (2012), which grossed a worldwide total at the box office of over $1 billion. He followed this by producing Zack Snyder's superhero film Man of Steel (2013) and directing the science fiction film Interstellar (2014), which starred Matthew McConaughey, Anne Hathaway, and Jessica Chastain. It won the Saturn Award for Best Science Fiction Film. In 2017, Nolan directed the war film Dunkirk, for which he received his first nomination for the Academy Award for Best Director. Three years later he directed the science fiction film Tenet (2020). His next feature was Oppenheimer (2023), a biopic centered on J. Robert Oppenheimer, with Cillian Murphy starring as the titular character; the film won the Academy Award for Best Picture and he won Best Director. His follow-up film, The Odyssey (2026), is an adaptation of Homer's epic poem starring Matt Damon as Odysseus.

== Feature film ==
Year	Title	Director	Writer	Producer	Note	Ref(s)
1998	Following	Yes	Yes	Yes	Also cinematographer and editor	
2000	Memento	Yes	Yes	No	Based on Memento Mori by Jonathan Nolan	
2002	Insomnia	Yes	No	No	Also Rewrites; Based on Insomnia by Nikolaj Frobenius, and Erik Skjoldbjærg	
2005	Batman Begins	Yes	Yes	No	Based on Characters by DC Comics	
2006	The Prestige	Yes	Yes	Yes	Based on The Prestige by Christopher Priest	
2008	The Dark Knight	Yes	Yes	Yes	Based on Characters by DC Comics	
2010	Inception	Yes	Yes	Yes		
2012	The Dark Knight Rises	Yes	Yes	Yes	Based on Characters by DC Comics	
2013	Man of Steel	No	Story	Yes	Based on Characters by DC Comics	
2014	Interstellar	Yes	Yes	Yes		
2017	Dunkirk	Yes	Yes	Yes		
2020	Tenet	Yes	Yes	Yes		
2023	Oppenheimer	Yes	Yes	Yes	Based on American Prometheus by Kai Bird, and Martin J. Sherwin	
2026	The Odyssey	Yes	Yes	Yes	Based on The Odyssey by Homer	

Executive producer

Year	Title	Notes	Ref(s)
2008	Batman: Gotham Knight	Consultant; Emma Thomas is credited as EP	
2014	Transcendence		
2016	Batman v Superman: Dawn of Justice		
2017	Justice League		
2021	Zack Snyder's Justice League	Director's cut of 2017's Justice League	
2024	Sanatorium Under the Sign of the Hourglass	"Presented by"	

== Short films ==
Year	Title	Director	Producer	Writer	Cinematographer	Editor	Notes	Ref(s)
1989	Tarantella	Yes	Yes	Yes	Yes	Yes	No official release Co-directed with Roko Belic	
1996	Larceny	Yes	Yes	Yes	Yes	Yes	No official release	
1997	Doodlebug	Yes	Yes	Yes	Yes	Yes		
2015	Quay	Yes	Yes	No	Yes	Yes	Also composer Documentary short	
2019	The Doll's Breath	No	Executive	No	No	No		

== Documentary appearances ==
Year	Title	Ref(s)
2011	These Amazing Shadows	
2012	Side by Side	
2016	Cinema Futures	
2018	James Cameron's Story of Science Fiction	
2019	Making Waves: The Art of Cinematic Sound	
2025	Hans Zimmer & Friends: Diamond in the Desert	
