= Sanatorium Under the Sign of the Hourglass (disambiguation) =

Sanatorium Under the Sign of the Hourglass is a 1937 novel by Polish writer and painter Bruno Schulz.

Sanatorium Under the Sign of the Hourglass may also refer to:

- Sanatorium Under the Sign of the Hourglass (album), a 2005 album by the Cracow Klezmer Band
- Sanatorium Under the Sign of the Hourglass (film), a 2024 film by the Brothers Quay
