= Syncopy Inc. =

British and American film production company

Syncopy Films Inc.
- Logo used since 2010
- Type: Private
- Industry: Film
- Founded: 27 February 2001; 25 years ago
- Founders: Emma Thomas; Christopher Nolan
- Headquarters: London, England; Los Angeles, California, U.S.
- Products: Motion pictures
- Owners: Emma Thomas; Christopher Nolan
- Number of employees: 4 (2018)

Syncopy Inc. is a British-American film production company founded and operated by Emma Thomas and Christopher Nolan. The name of the company is a play on syncopation. It has offices in London and Los Angeles.

The on-screen logo contains a maze with the company name.

== History ==
Founded on 27 February 2001, the majority of Syncopy's productions have been distributed by Warner Bros. They partnered with Legendary Pictures to produce Batman Begins (2005), The Prestige (2006), The Dark Knight (2008), Inception (2010), and The Dark Knight Rises (2012). In 2013, Syncopy released Zack Snyder's Man of Steel, and in 2015, they formed a joint venture with Zeitgeist Films to release Blu-ray editions of Zeitgeist's prestige films. The first title in their partnership was Elena (2011), from director Andrey Zvyagintsev. Later on, the production company produced the science fiction film Interstellar (2014), the documentary short Quay (2015), the war film Dunkirk (2017), and the spy film Tenet (2020), all directed by Christopher Nolan.

Other than Nolan and Thomas, the company employs only 2 people. In a 2018 interview for Vanity Fair, Thomas said, "We're not empire builders, we're about the individual film." In October 2021, it was announced that Nolan's next film, titled Oppenheimer, would be shot in IMAX and 65mm film. It was released on 21 July 2023. The film stars Cillian Murphy in the title role, with Hoyte van Hoytema, Jennifer Lame, and Ludwig Göransson all returning in their respective technical roles. This was Nolan's first film distributed by Universal Pictures and resulted in both his first Best Picture and Best Director Oscar win, awarded at the 96th Academy Awards.

== Filmography ==
=== Feature films ===
Year	Title	Director	Co-production company(s)	Distributor	Box office	Ref.
2005	Batman Begins	Christopher Nolan	Legendary Pictures, DC Entertainment	Warner Bros. Pictures	$375 million	
2006	The Prestige	Christopher Nolan	Touchstone Pictures, Newmarket Films	Warner Bros. Pictures, Buena Vista Pictures	$109 million	
2008	The Dark Knight	Christopher Nolan	Legendary Pictures, DC Entertainment	Warner Bros. Pictures	$1 billion	
2010	Inception	Christopher Nolan	Legendary Pictures	Warner Bros. Pictures	$839 million	
2012	The Dark Knight Rises	Christopher Nolan	Legendary Pictures, DC Entertainment	Warner Bros. Pictures	$1.11 billion	
2013	Man of Steel	Zack Snyder	Legendary Pictures, DC Entertainment, Peters Entertainment	Warner Bros. Pictures	$670 million	
2014	Interstellar	Christopher Nolan	Legendary Pictures, Lynda Obst Productions	Warner Bros. Pictures, Paramount Pictures	$774 million	
2017	Dunkirk	Christopher Nolan	RatPac-Dune Entertainment	Warner Bros. Pictures	$549 million	
2020	Tenet	Christopher Nolan	—N/a	Warner Bros. Pictures	$365 million	
2023	Oppenheimer	Christopher Nolan	Atlas Entertainment	Universal Pictures	$975 million	
2026	The Odyssey	Christopher Nolan	—N/a	Universal Pictures	$1.804 billion	
Box office total:					$8.5 billion	—

=== Short films ===
Year	Title	Director	Co-production company(s)	Distributor	Ref.
2015	Quay	Christopher Nolan	—N/a	Zeitgeist Films	
2019	The Doll's Breath	Stephen Quay and Timothy Quay	Koninck Studios	Zeitgeist Films	
