= Kundrotas =

Kundrotas is the masculine form of a Lithuanian family name. Its feminine forms are: Kundrotienė (married woman or widow) and Kundrotaitė (unmarried woman).

The surname may refer to:

- Arūnas Kundrotas (de, lt), Lithuanian politician
- Česlovas Kundrotas (b. 1961), Lithuanian long-distance runner

== See also ==
- Kondrotas
- Kondrat
