= The Piano Tuner of Earthquakes =

2005 animated film by Stephen Quay and Timothy Quay

- Official release poster
- Directed by: Stephen Quay; Timothy Quay
- Written by: Alan Passes; Stephen Quay; Timothy Quay
- Produced by: Terry Gilliam; Keith Griffiths; Hengameh Panahi; Alexander Ris
- Starring: Amira Casar; Gottfried John; Assumpta Serna; César Sarachu
- Cinematography: Nick Knowland
- Edited by: Simon Laurie
- Music by: Trevor Duncan; Christopher Slaski
- Production company: Koninck Studios
- Distributed by: Piffl Medien (Germany); E.D. Distribution (France); Artificial Eye (United Kingdom)
- Release dates: 9 September 2005 (TIFF); 17 November 2006 (United States)
- Running time: 99 minutes
- Countries: Germany; France; United Kingdom
- Languages: Portuguese; English
- Box office: $29,121

The Piano Tuner of Earthquakes is a 2005 animated drama film written and directed by the Brothers Quay. The film stars Amira Casar, Gottfried John, Assumpta Serna and César Sarachu. It is the second feature-length film by the Brothers Quay and their first film in over a decade.

The Piano Tuner of Earthquakes had its world premiere at the Toronto International Film Festival on 9 September 2005, prior to being theatrically released by Zeitgeist Films on 17 November 2006.

== Plot ==
A 19th-century opera singer is murdered on-stage shortly before her forthcoming wedding. Soon after being slain by the nefarious Dr. Emmanuel Droz during a live performance, Malvina van Stille is spirited away to the inventor's remote villa to be reanimated and forced to play the lead in a grim production staged to recreate her abduction. As the time for the performance draws near, piano tuner of earthquakes Felisberto sets out to activate the seven essential automata who dot the dreaded doctor's landscape and make sure all the essential elements are in place. Once again instilled with life after her brief stay in the afterworld, amnesiac Malvina is soon drawn to the mysterious Felisberto as a result of his uncanny resemblance to her one-time fiancé Adolfo.

== Cast ==
- Amira Casar as Malvina van Stille
- Gottfried John as Dr. Emmanuel Droz
- Assumpta Serna as Assumpta
- César Sarachu as Adolfo Blin / Don Felisberto Fernandez

== Production ==
An animated film was in development by the filmmaking duo, the Brothers Quay, in their first film in over a decade, after Institute Benjamenta, or This Dream People Call Human Life (1995). The cast was announced to consist of Amira Casar, Gottfried John, Assumpta Serna and César Sarachu. The music was composed by Christopher Slaski and Trevor Duncan.

== Release ==
The Piano Tuner of Earthquakes had its world premiere at the Toronto International Film Festival on 9 September 2005. The film was theatrically released by Zeitgeist Films on 17 November 2006.

=== Critical reception ===
On the review aggregator website Rotten Tomatoes, 42% of 38 critics' reviews are positive, with an average rating of 5.5/10. The website's consensus reads: "Though visually stunning and brilliantly original, the film fails to resonate emotionally." Metacritic, which uses a weighted average, assigned the film a score of 66 out of 100, based on 14 critics, indicating "generally favorable" reviews.

=== Box office ===
As of 1 October 2024, The Piano Turner of Earthquakes has grossed $29,121 in the United States.

In the United States, the film grossed $944 in its opening weekend.

== See also ==
- List of stop-motion films
