= The Street of Crocodiles =

1934 Bruno Schulz short story collection

- First edition
- Author: Bruno Schulz
- Original title: Sklepy cynamonowe
- Translator: Celina Wieniewska
- Language: Polish
- Genre: Prose poetry, Magical realism
- Publisher: Towarzystwo Wydawnicze "Rój"
- Publication date: 1933
- Publication place: Poland
- English publication date: 1962

The Street of Crocodiles, also known as The Cinnamon Shops (Polish: Sklepy cynamonowe, lit. 'Cinnamon Shops'), is a 1934 collection of short stories written by Bruno Schulz. First published in Polish, the collection was translated into English by Celina Wieniewska in 1963.

== Origins and publication ==
Schulz's earliest literary endeavors can probably be dated back to 1925. They included rough drafts of the short stories, later published in the collection The Street of Crocodiles, which the writer used to send to his friends Władysław Riff and Debora Vogel. Although in 1928 Schultz had already written the short story A July Night, it was included in the second volume entitled Sanatorium Under the Sign of the Hourglass which was published in 1937.

All Debora Vogel's efforts to have Schulz's works published were in vain. It was only after the writer Zofia Nałkowska, from whom Schulz had sought help, expressed her support for him that the work was published in December 1933, dated 1934.

== Title ==
The original title of the collection can be literally translated into English as "Cinnamon Shops." There is also a short story with the same title included in the collection. Cinnamon shops mentioned by the narrator of the story are situated in the centre of the town where the narrator lives.

== Plot ==
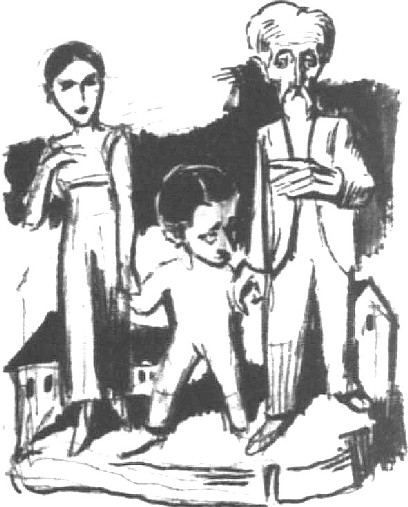
An illustration by Bruno Schulz

The collection tells the story of a merchant family from a small Galician town which resembles the writer's home town of Drohobycz in many respects. The story abounds in mythical elements introduced by means of the visionary and dreamlike literary depiction (e.g. frequently occurring motif of labyrinths) characteristic of the writer. It is thus mythologized reality, processed by the imagination, artistically distorted and enriched by all possible references and allusions to other literary works, to great myths, to other more exotic domains of reality.

One of the most significant characters in the work is the Father, who is not only the head of the family, a merchant running a textile shop in the marketplace, but also a mad experimenter endowed with superhuman abilities, a demiurge living between life and death, between the world of the real and the imaginary. Despite the literary fascination with the character of the Father displayed by Schulz, it is Józef whom he renders the work's protagonist and narrator. In the character of this young boy eagerly discovering the world that surrounds him, many of Schulz's own traits are clearly visible.

Another is the servant girl Adela. She is a dominant woman and object of desire. She controls and threatens the Father, on one occasion freeing all of the birds he has collected in the attic, driving them away with her broom.

== Language ==
The language adopted by Schulz is rich and unique, marked by various eccentric sequences of metaphors. The metaphors perform diverse functions; the writer brings inanimate objects into existence and presents humans as non-human animals. He uses multiple complex sentences, employs unfamiliar, old-fashioned and long-forgotten words as well as scientific (e.g. biological) terminology. These techniques caught the attention of and were discussed already by the first critics of Schulz, including Tadeusz Breza. Schulz's prose in the original Polish is full of Latinisms, arguably derived from the bureaucratic language of the Austro-Hungarian Empire. He drew on these words instead of more familiar Slavic terms to defamiliarise the text.

== Critical reception ==
The short story collection was well received by such writers and literary critics as Leon Piwiński, Tadeusz Breza (he defined Schulz's writing as uniquely beautiful and the true essence of poetry), Stanisław Ignacy Witkiewicz, Antoni Słonimski, Julian Tuwim and Adolf Nowaczyński. The majority of critics valued the work mainly due to its linguistic features, yet there were also some (e.g. Witkacy) who were enthralled by the metaphysical aspects of the stories. The work was frequently mentioned as one of the nominees for the award of the weekly literary magazine Wiadomości Literackie. However, there were some negative and reproachful reviews as well, produced mainly by the rightist and leftist press, which disapproved of the avant-garde nature of the work. Schulz’s writing was criticized in the negative reviews for "mannerism" and "uselessness."

== Titles of the short stories ==
- August
- Visitation
- Birds
- Tailors' Dummies
- Treatise on Tailors' Dummies or the Second Book of Genesis
- Treatise on Tailors' Dummies: Continuation
- Treatise on Tailors' Dummies: Conclusion
- Nimrod
- Pan
- Mr. Charles
- Cinnamon Shops
- The Street of Crocodiles
- Cockroaches
- The Gale
- The Night of the Great Season
- The Comet

== Adaptations ==
A 1986 Brothers Quay stop-motion animation, Street of Crocodiles, is based on the book. The work was also adapted, in 1992, as a stage play, by Théâtre de Complicité. This latter adaptation was first staged in August 1992 at the Cottesloe Theatre at the National Theatre in London; it toured throughout 1992 and 1993 and was nominated for four Olivier Awards.

In 2010, the British Intellect published Katarzyna Marciniak and Kamil Turowski's photo album, Streets of Crocodiles: Photography, Media, and Postsocialist Landscapes in Poland. The book, inspired by Schulz's short story and available in print and electronic formats, is introduced by The Village Voice film critic, J. Hoberman, as "...a walk on the wild side, an expedition down a melancholy boulevard of dreams."

Jonathan Safran Foer's Tree of Codes is an adaptation of the book in the tradition of Tom Phillips's book A Humument. Safran Foer cut words from The Street of Crocodiles in order to create his own story. Foer's novel has been turned into a full-length contemporary ballet by Wayne McGregor, commissioned by and premiered at the Manchester International Festival on Friday 3 July 2015 in the city's Opera House theatre; and an opera by Liza Lim, commissioned and premiered by Ensemble Musikfabrik on 9 April 2016 at the Staatenhaus, Cologne.
