= Felisberto Hernández =

Uruguayan writer, composer, and pianist (1902–1964)

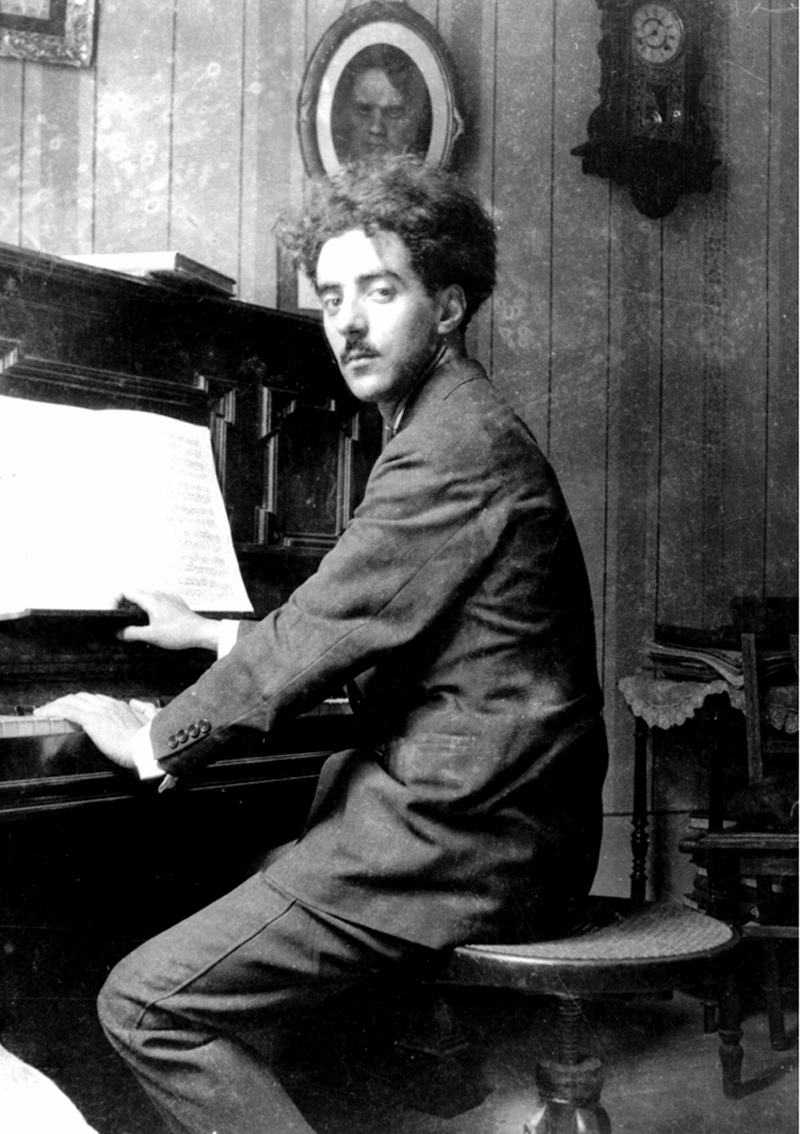
Felisberto Hernández playing the piano.

Felisberto Hernández (October 20, 1902 – January 13, 1964) was an Uruguayan writer, composer, and pianist, regarded as one of the most distinctive and original figures in 20th-century Latin American literature.

== Background ==
Hernández was born the eldest of four children in the Atahualpa neighborhood of Montevideo, Uruguay. His father, Prudencio Hernández, was from Tenerife, Canary Islands; his mother, Juana Silva, was born in Rocha, Uruguay.

At the age of nine, Hernández began to study piano. Later, Hernández was taught composition and harmony by Clemente Colling. Due to economic hardship, Hernández began to teach piano himself and accompany silent films at the age of 16. By the age of 20, Hernández began to perform in public recitals, including works of his own creation on his programs. Hernández, at the age of 23, became a pupil of Guillermo Kolischer.

He died of complications related from leukemia. A selection of his papers is stored in the archives of American University in Washington, D.C.

== Short stories ==
Hernández is considered to be the forefather of magic realism, predating writers such as Gabriel García Márquez, Italo Calvino and Julio Cortázar, who all note Hernández as a major influence. This fact can be seen in a letter by Cortázar to Hernández entitled "Letter In One's Own Hand" in which the younger Cortázar praises Hernández for the trail he blazed. Hernández's fiction often explores the secret vitality contained in inanimate objects.

Some of his most famous stories are: "The Balcony," "My First Concert," and "Daisy Dolls."

== Works published during Hernández's lifetime ==
- Fulano de tal (1925)
- Libro sin tapas (1928)
- La cara de Ana (1930)
- La envenenada (1931)
- Por los tiempos de Clemente Colling (1942)
- El caballo perdido (1943)
- Nadie encendía las lámparas (1947)
- Las Hortensias (1949)
- La casa inundada (1960)

== Posthumous editions ==
- Obras completas (1965-1974). Buenos Aires, Arca. Six volumes.
- Obras completas (1981-1983). Buenos Aires, Arca-Calicanto. Three volumes.
- Obras completas (1983). México. ISBN 978-968-23-1255-7. Three volumes
- Felisberto Hernández. Novelas y cuentos (1985). Caracas, Ayacucho.
- Narraciones incompletas (1990). Madrid, Siruela.
- Nadie encendía las lámparas (2000). Madrid, Cátedra. Colección Letras Hispánicas.
- Cuentos reunidos (2009). Buenos Aires, Eterna Cadencia.
- La casa inundada (2012). Villaür, Atalanta.
- Las Hortensias y otros cuentos (2013). Buenos Aires, Stockcero/SpanishBooksPress.com.
- Narrativa completa (2015). Buenos Aires, El Cuenco de Plata.
- Felisberto Hernández. Narraciones (2015). La Habana, Casa de las Américas.
- Obra incompleta (2015). Montevideo, Ediciones del Caballo Perdido/Ediciones Cruz del Sur.
- Narrativa reunida (2015). Montevideo, Alfaguara.

== Selected works translated into English ==
- "The Daisy Dolls", in Masterworks of Latin American Short Fiction: Eight Novellas, Icon Editions, 1996.
- Piano Stories, translated by Luis Harss, Marsilio Publishers, 1993. Reissued by New Directions, 2014.
- "Crocodile", in Two Crocodiles, translated by Esther Allen, New Directions, 2013.
- Lands of Memory, translated by Esther Allen, New Directions Press, 2002.

== Adaptations ==
Hernández' life and work was the subject of the 2013 short film Unmistaken Hands: Ex Voto F.H by the animation filmmakers the Quay Brothers. The short was inspired in particular by the Hernández short stories "The Balcony" and "The Flooded House" and is available to view as part of the British Film Institute's Blu-ray collection of the Quays films. The Quays were again inspired by Hernández for their 2019 animated short film The Doll's Breath, an adaptation of Hernández' Las Hortensias.

== See also ==
- List of Uruguayan writers
