= The Hourglass Sanatorium =

1973 film by Wojciech Jerzy Has

- Theatrical release poster
- Polish: Sanatorium pod klepsydrą
- Directed by: Wojciech Jerzy Has
- Screenplay by: Wojciech Jerzy Has
- Based on: Sanatorium Under the Sign of the Hourglass by Bruno Schulz
- Starring: Jan Nowicki; Tadeusz Kondrat; Mieczysław Voit; Halina Kowalska; Gustaw Holoubek
- Cinematography: Witold Sobociński
- Edited by: Janina Niedźwiecka
- Music by: Jerzy Maksymiuk
- Production company: Zespół Filmowy Silesia
- Distributed by: Film Polski
- Release dates: May 1973 (Cannes Film Festival); 11 December 1973 (Poland)
- Running time: 119 minutes
- Country: Poland
- Languages: Polish; Yiddish

The Hourglass Sanatorium (Polish: Sanatorium pod klepsydrą) is a 1973 Polish drama film directed by Wojciech Jerzy Has, starring Jan Nowicki, Tadeusz Kondrat, Mieczysław Voit, Halina Kowalska and Gustaw Holoubek. It is also known as The Sandglass in English-speaking countries. The story follows a young Jewish man who visits his father in a mystical sanatorium where time does not behave normally. The film is an adaptation of Bruno Schulz's story collection Sanatorium Under the Sign of the Hourglass. It won the Jury Prize at the 1973 Cannes Film Festival.

== Plot ==
Joseph (Jan Nowicki) travels through a dream-like world, taking a dilapidated train to visit his dying father, Jacob, in a sanatorium. When he arrives at the hospital, he finds the entire facility is going to ruin and no one seems to be in charge or even caring for the patients. Time appears to behave in unpredictable ways, reanimating the past in an elaborate artificial caprice.

Though Joseph is always shown as an adult, his behavior and the people around often depict him as a child. He befriends Rudolf, a young boy who owns a postage stamp album. The names of the stamps trigger a wealth of association and adventure in Joseph. Among the many occurrences in this visually potent phantasmagoria include Joseph re-entering childhood episodes with his wildly eccentric father (who lives with birds in an attic), being arrested by a mysterious unit of soldiers for having a dream that was severely criticized in high places, reflecting on a girl he fantasized about in his boyhood and commandeering a group of historic wax mannequins. Throughout his strange journey, an ominous blind train conductor reappears like a death figure. He also has a series of reflections on the Holocaust that were not present in the original texts, reading Schulz's prose through the prism of the author's death during World War II and the demise of the world he described.

== Cast ==
- Jan Nowicki as Józef
- Tadeusz Kondrat as Jakub, Józef's father
- Irena Orska as Józef's mother
- Halina Kowalska as Adela
- Gustaw Holoubek as Dr. Gotard
- Mieczysław Voit as train conductor
- Bożena Adamek as Bianka
- Ludwik Benoit as Szloma
- Henryk Boukołowski as firefighter
- Seweryn Dalecki as Teodor the clerk
- Jerzy Przybylski as Mr. de V.
- Julian Jabczyński as dignitary
- Wiktor Sadecki as dignitary
- Janina Sokołowska as nurse
- Wojciech Standełło as a Jew
- Tadeusz Schmidt as officer
- Szymon Szurmiej as Jew reciting verses from Ecclesiastes false
- Paweł Unrug as ornithologist
- Filip Zylber as Rudolf
- Jerzy Trela as jester

== Production ==
The Hourglass Sanatorium is not solely an adaptation of Sanatorium Under the Sign of the Hourglass, but also includes sequences from other works by Bruno Schulz. Regarding the possibility of a film adaptation of a book written by Schulz, director Wojciech Jerzy Has said: "Schulz's poetic prose was the reading of my early youth. It influenced my films. That is why the realization of The Hourglass Sanatorium was a must for me. My aim was not to make a literal adaption of the work, but rather to do justice to what we call the work's poetics: its unique, isolated world, its atmospherics, colours and shapes." The time period of the film is a mixture of elements from the turn-of-the-century Galicia where Schulz grew up, and Has' own pre-World War II memories of the same region. The film was produced by Zespół Filmowy Silesia. Principal photography took place at the Wytwórnia Filmów Fabularnych studios in Łódź.

== Release ==
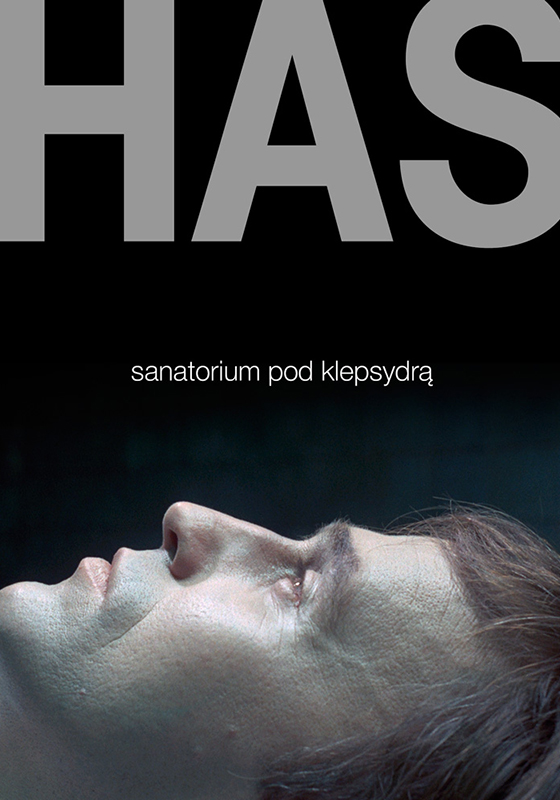
Film poster by Tomasz Wójcik, 2017

Despite being a major production, the finished film was met by reluctance from the Polish authorities. Not only was the crumbled sanatorium interpreted as a parallel to the poor condition of many institutions and manor houses in contemporary Poland; Has had also chosen to emphasize the Jewish aspects of the source material, and this soon after an antisemitic campaign the government had launched in 1968, which had prompted around 30,000 Polish Jews to leave the country. The authorities forbade Has to submit The Hourglass Sanatorium for the 1973 Cannes Film Festival, but the director managed to smuggle a print abroad so the film could be screened at the festival. The Cannes jury, led by actress Ingrid Bergman, honoured the film with the Jury Prize. The Polish premiere took place on December 11, 1973. The film is among 21 digitally restored classic Polish films chosen for Martin Scorsese Presents: Masterpieces of Polish Cinema. and has been released on Blu-ray in a related box set by Milestone Cinema.

== Reception ==
When The Hourglass Sanatorium was released in Poland it met with mixed reviews from the critics and it was mostly criticized by literary scholars. Artur Sandauer noted that the book was a great material for a film, however, he strongly rejected Has's adaptation since in his opinion it changed Schulz's story "of cosmic dimensions" into "grotesque folklore". Jerzy Jastrzębski opined that Has's film evokes "a feeling of clear insufficiency". The film was positively reviewed by Konrad Eberhard and Adam Garbicz who claimed that it wasn't the film director's intention to adapt Schulz's prose in a literal manner but rather to capture its eschatological climate.

In France, the film was very positively received with film critics such as François Mourin, writing for L'Humanité, praising it for the costumes, set design and decorations, cinematography as well as the actors' performances. Jacques Siclier, writing for Le Monde, stated that the viewer experiences "an emotional and breathtaking shock". Richard Bégin described the film's "permeable atmosphere of transcience and deadness" generated by the dominant shots of ruins.

The film also received recognition in Britain and the United States. Phelim O'Neill of The Guardian considered Has's film as "another psychedelic classic" while Michael Wilmington of Chicago Tribune gave the film 3.5 stars out of 4 commenting on the splendid and surreal adaptation of Schulz's literary work.

In the 2015 poll conducted by Polish Museum of Cinematography in Łódź, The Hourglass Sanatorium was ranked as the fifth greatest Polish film of all time.

== Awards and honours ==
- Jury Prize at the 1973 Cannes Festival
  - Nomination for the Palme d'Or at the 1973 Cannes Festival
- Award for the Best Scenography at the 1974 Gdansk Film Festival: Andrzej Płocki and Jerzy Skarżyński

== Themes ==
An article by Witold Kiedacz explored the sophisticated structure of the film: "(The film) is built on the principle of tripartite composition. The compositional clasp, binding the material of the middle sequences on both sides into one cohesive whole, is the motif of the conductor-guide that appears at the beginning and at the end of the film. The middle part, on the other hand, is filled with Józef's dream, which is nothing more than a re-experience of childhood, and the reality of the town where the sanatorium is located." Elements from all stories from Schulz's collection were intertwined in Has's film, in whose finale the characters of the conductor and Józef symbolically blend together; Joseph goes blind while gaining wisdom and learning to see "things and things unseen by the ordinary, average person."

Konrad Eberhardt noted that Has's film gives a more tragic tone to Schulz's stories, as it weaves into them the theme of the Holocaust. This motif is recognizable only in one scene, when Józef watches through the basement window a crowd of people fleeing in panic with all their belongings. However, the very first scene of the film, in which a prisoner on a camp bunk appears among the train passengers, communicates to the viewer the experience of the Holocaust.

In her monographic analysis of the film, Małgorzata Jakubowska emphasized the role played by the labyrinth structure in Has's film. Interpreting The Hourglass Sanatorium through the prism of Deleuze's and Guattari's theory of rhizomes, Jakubowska noticed that not only the film's non-linear narrative, but also the presence in the film world of shoots, ivy and ferns growing luxuriantly in various directions proves the artistic implementation of the idea of rhizome avant la lettre.

== See also ==
- Sanatorium Under the Sign of the Hourglass, a 2024 film based on the same novel
- Cinema of Poland
- List of Polish language films
