= Kondrat =

Kondrat is a surname derived Greek Κοδράτος, a name of several Christian saints. Notable people with the name include:

- Józef Kondrat (1902–1974), Polish actor
- Marek Kondrat (born 1950), Polish actor
- Michał Kondrat (born 1978), Polish film director, producer, and screenwriter
- Tadeusz Kondrat (1908–1994), Polish actor
