= Bruno Schulz =

Polish Jewish writer and artist (1892-1942)

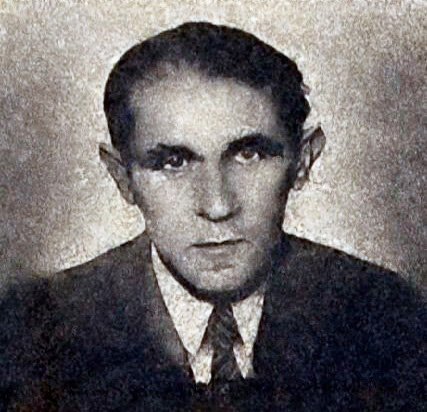
- Born: 12 July 1892; Drohobycz, Kingdom of Galicia and Lodomeria, Austria-Hungary (now Ukraine)
- Died: 19 November 1942 (aged 50); Drohobycz, District of Galicia, General Government
- Education: Lwów Polytechnic
- Occupations: Writer; artist; literary critic; art teacher
- Writing career
- Genres: Novel, short story
- Notable works: Sanatorium Under the Sign of the Hourglass, 1937; The Street of Crocodiles, 1933
- Movements: Modernism, surrealism, magic realism

Bruno Schulz (12 July 1892 – 19 November 1942) was a Polish-Jewish writer, literary critic, visual artist, and art teacher.

He is regarded as one of the great 20th-century Polish-language prose stylists. In 1938 he was awarded the prestigious Golden Laurel award of the Polish Academy of Literature.

Several of Schulz's works were lost in the Holocaust, including short stories from the early 1940s and his final, unfinished novel, The Messiah.

In 1942 he was shot dead by a Gestapo officer while carrying a loaf of bread to his home in the Drohobycz Ghetto.

== Biography ==
Schulz was born on 12 July 1892 in Drohobycz, Austrian Galicia (present-day Drohobych, Ukraine) to Jakub Schulz, a cloth merchant, and Henrietta Schulz (née Kuhmerker). At a very early age, he developed an interest in the arts. He attended Władysław Jagiełło Middle School in Drohobych from 1902 to 1910, graduating with honours. Then he studied architecture at Lwów Polytechnic. His studies were interrupted by illness in 1911 but he resumed them in 1913 after two years of convalescence. In 1917, he briefly studied architecture in Vienna. At the end of World War I, when Schulz was 26, Drohobycz became part of the newly reborn Polish Second Republic. Schulz returned to Władysław Jagiełło Middle School, teaching crafts and drawing from 1924 to 1941. His employment kept him in his hometown, although he disliked the teaching, apparently maintaining his job only because it was his sole source of income. He also amused himself by telling his students stories during classes.

Schulz developed his extraordinary imagination in a swarm of identities and nationalities: he was a Jew who thought and wrote in Polish, was fluent in German, immersed in Jewish culture, yet unfamiliar with the Yiddish language. He drew inspiration from specific local and ethnic sources, looking inward and close to home rather than to the world at large. Avoiding travel, he preferred to remain in his provincial hometown, which over the course of his life belonged to or was fought over by successive states: the Austro-Hungarian Empire (1792–1919); the short-lived West Ukrainian People's Republic (1919); the Second Polish Republic (1919–1939); the Soviet Ukraine from the invasion of Poland in 1939; and, during Operation Barbarossa, Nazi Germany after the German attack on the Soviet Union in 1941. His writings avoided explicit mention of world events of the time period.

Schulz was discouraged by influential colleagues from publishing his first short stories. However, his aspirations were refreshed when several letters that he wrote to a friend, Debora Vogel, in which he gave highly original accounts of his solitary life and the details of the lives of his family and fellow citizens, were brought to the attention of the novelist Zofia Nałkowska. She encouraged Schulz to have them published as short fiction. They were published as The Cinnamon Shops (Sklepy Cynamonowe) in 1934. In English-speaking countries, it is most often referred to as The Street of Crocodiles, a title derived from one of its chapters. The Cinnamon Shops was followed three years later by Sanatorium Under the Sign of the Hourglass, (Sanatorium Pod Klepsydrą). The original publications were illustrated by Schulz; in later editions of his works, however, these illustrations were often left out or poorly reproduced. In 1936, he helped his fiancée, Józefina Szelińska, translate Franz Kafka's The Trial into Polish. In 1938, he was awarded the Polish Academy of Literature's prestigious Golden Laurel award.

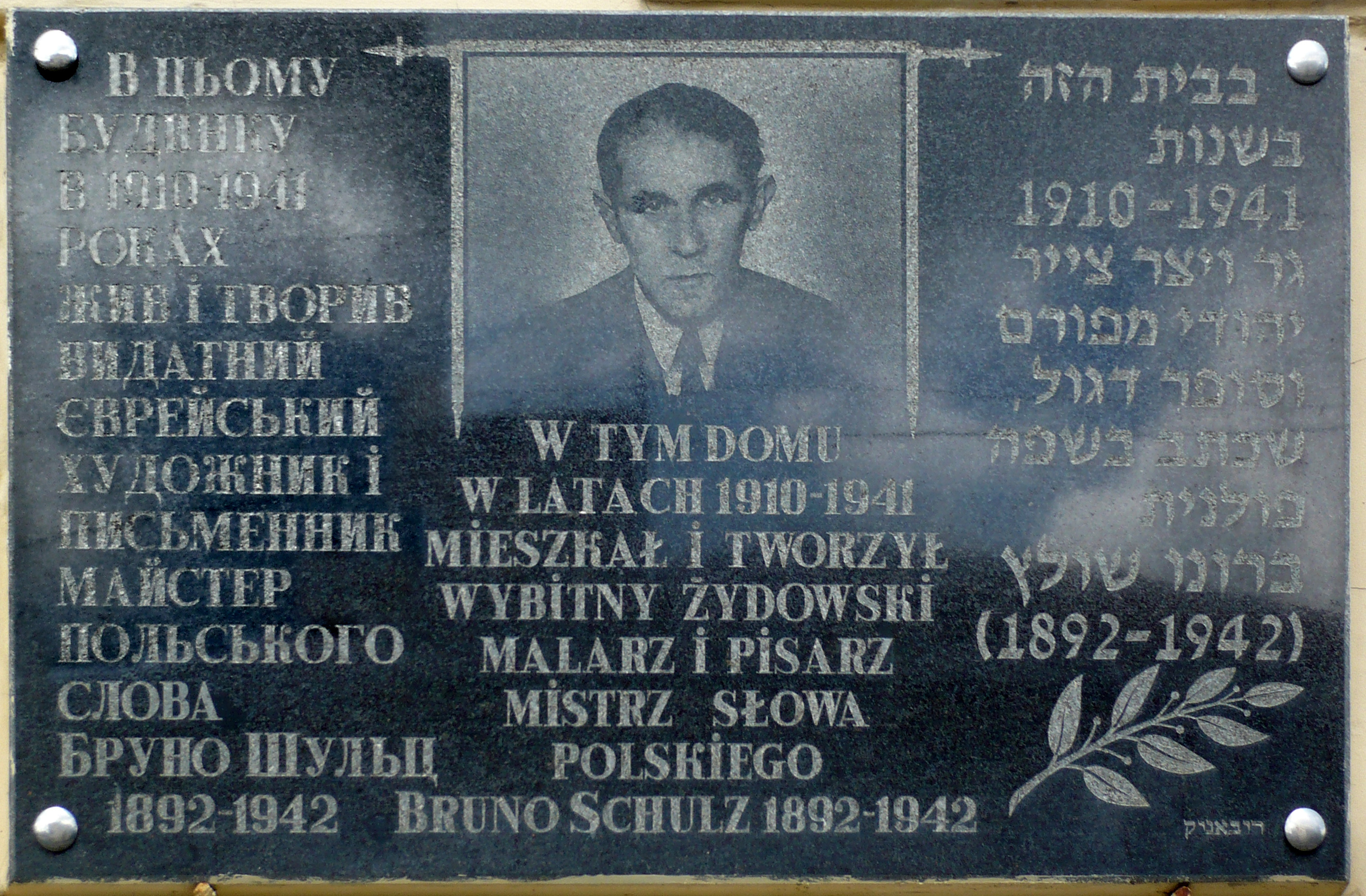
Commemorative plaque at the Drohobycz Ghetto house of Bruno Schulz with text in Ukrainian, Polish and Hebrew

In 1939, after the Nazi and Soviet invasion of Poland in World War II, Drohobych was occupied by the Soviet Union. At the time, Schulz was known to have been working on a novel called The Messiah, but no trace of the manuscript survived his death. When the Germans launched their Operation Barbarossa against the Soviets in 1941, they forced Schulz into the newly formed Drohobycz Ghetto along with thousands of other dispossessed Jews, most of whom perished at the Belzec extermination camp before the end of 1942. A Nazi Gestapo officer, Felix Landau, however, admired Schulz's artwork and extended him protection in exchange for painting a mural in his Drohobych residence. Shortly after completing the work in 1942, Schulz was walking home through the "Aryan quarter" with a loaf of bread, when another Gestapo officer, Karl Günther, shot him with a small pistol, killing him. This murder was in revenge for Landau's having murdered Günther's own "personal Jew," a dentist named Löw. Subsequently, Schulz's mural was painted over and forgotten – only to be rediscovered in 2001.

== Writings ==
Schulz's body of written work is small: The Street of Crocodiles, Sanatorium Under the Sign of the Hourglass and a few other compositions that the author did not add to the first edition of his short story collection. A collection of Schulz's letters was published in Polish in 1975, entitled The Book of Letters, as well as a number of critical essays that Schulz wrote for various newspapers. Several of Schulz's works have been lost, including short stories from the early 1940s that the author had sent to be published in magazines, and his final, unfinished novel, The Messiah.

From May 2024, the only surviving literary manuscript by Bruno Schulz (short story Second Autumn (Polish: Druga jesień) is presented at a permanent exhibition in the Palace of the Commonwealth in Warsaw.

== English translations ==
The Street of Crocodiles and Sanatorium Under the Sign of the Hourglass were featured in Penguin's series "Writers from the Other Europe" from the 1970s. Philip Roth was the general editor, and the series included authors such as Danilo Kiš, Tadeusz Borowski, Jiří Weil, and Milan Kundera.

An edition of Schulz's stories was published in 1957, leading to French, German, and later English translations. The first English translations were The Street of Crocodiles, New York: Walker and Company, 1963 (translation by Celina Wieniewska of Sklepy Cynamonowe (Cinnamon Shops)) and Sanatorium Under the Sign of the Hourglass New York: Penguin, 1979, (translation by Celina Wieniewska of Sanatorium Pod Klepsydrą, with an introduction by John Updike) ISBN 0-14-005272-0. The two were later combined into one collection, published as The Complete Fiction of Bruno Schulz. New York: Walker and Company, 1989 ISBN 0-8027-1091-3

Madeline G. Levine translated Schulz's fiction as Collected Stories for Northwestern University Press (2018), which won the Found in Translation Award in 2019.

In 2020, Sublunary Editions published Frank Garrett's translation of Undula, an early story by Schulz which appeared in Dawn: The Journal of Petroleum Officials in Boryslav under the pseudonym Marceli Weron.

Stanley Bill's translation of 13 of Schulz's stories (including Undula) was published under the title Nocturnal Apparitions: Essential Stories in 2022.

== Adaptations ==
Schulz's work has provided the basis for three films. Wojciech Has' The Hourglass Sanatorium (1973) draws from a dozen of his stories and recreates the dreamlike quality of his writings. A 21-minute stop-motion animated 1986 film, Street of Crocodiles, by the Brothers Quay, was inspired by Schulz's writing, as was their 2024 feature Sanatorium Under the Sign of the Hourglass which combines stop-motion animation and live action.

In 1992, an experimental theatre piece based on The Street of Crocodiles was conceived and directed by Simon McBurney and produced by Theatre de Complicité in collaboration with the National Theatre in London. A highly complex interweaving of image, movement, text, puppetry, object manipulation, naturalistic and stylised performance underscored by music from Alfred Schnittke, Vladimir Martynov drew on Schulz's stories, his letters and biography. It received six Olivier Award nominations (1992) after its initial run and was revived four times in London in the years that followed, influencing a whole generation of British theatre makers. It subsequently played to audiences and festivals all over the world, such as Quebec (Prix du Festival 1994), Moscow, Munich (teatre der Welt 1994), Vilnius and many other countries. It was last revived in 1998 when it played in New York (Lincoln Center Festival) and other cities in the United States, Tokyo and Australia before returning to London to play an 8-week sell-out season at the Queens Theatre on Shaftesbury Avenue. It has been published by Methuen, a UK publishing house, in a collection of plays by Complicité.

In 2006, as part of a site-specific series in a historic Minneapolis office building, Skewed Visions created the multimedia performance/installation The Hidden Room. Combining aspects of Schulz's life with his writings and drawings, the piece depicted the complex stories of his life through movement, imagery and highly stylised manipulation of objects and puppets.

In 2007, physical theatre company Double Edge Theatre premiered a piece called Republic of Dreams, based on the life and works of Bruno Schulz. In 2008, a play based on Cinnamon Shops, directed by Frank Soehnle and performed by the Puppet Theatre from Białystok, was performed at the Jewish Culture Festival in Kraków. A performance based on the writings and art of Bruno Schulz, called "From A Dream to A Dream", was created collaboratively by Hand2Mouth Theatre (Portland, Oregon) and Teatr Stacja Szamocin (Szamocin, Poland) under the direction of Luba Zarembinska between 2006 and 2008. The production premiered in Portland in 2008.

== Literary references and biography ==
Cynthia Ozick's 1987 novel, The Messiah of Stockholm, makes reference to Schulz's work. The story is of a Swedish man who's convinced that he is the son of Schulz, and comes into possession of what he believes to be a manuscript of Schulz's final project, The Messiah. Schulz's character appears again in Israeli novelist David Grossman's 1989 novel See Under: Love. In a chapter entitled "Bruno," the narrator imagines Schulz embarking on a phantasmagoric sea voyage rather than remaining in Drohobych to be killed. That entire novel has been described by Grossman as a tribute to Schulz.

In the last chapter of Roberto Bolaño's 1996 novel Distant Star, the narrator, Arturo B, reads from a book titled The Complete Works of Bruno Schulz in a bar while waiting to confirm the identity of a Nazi-like character, Carlos Wieder, for a detective. When Wieder appears in the bar, the words of Schulz's stories '...had taken on a monstrous character that was almost intolerable' for Arturo B.

Polish writer and critic Jerzy Ficowski spent sixty years researching and uncovering the writings and drawings of Schulz. His study, Regions of the Great Heresy, was published in an English translation in 2003, containing two additional chapters to the Polish edition; one on Schulz's lost work, Messiah, the other on the rediscovery of Schulz's murals.

China Miéville's 2009 novel The City & the City begins with an epigraph from John Curran Davis's translation of Schulz's The Cinnamon Shops: "Deep inside the town there open up, so to speak, double streets, doppelgänger streets, mendacious and delusive streets". In addition to directly alluding to the dual nature of the cities in Miéville's novel, the epigraph also hints at the political implications of the book, since Schulz himself was murdered for appearing in the "wrong" quarter of the city.

In 2010, Jonathan Safran Foer "wrote" his Tree of Codes by cutting into the pages of an English language edition of Schulz' The Street of Crocodiles thus creating a new text. In 2011, the Austrian Rock and Roll Band "Nebenjob" published the song "Wer erschoss Bruno Schulz?" ("who shot Bruno Schulz?"), a homage to the poet and accusation of the murderer, written by T.G. Huemer (see 'references' below). Schulz and The Street of Crocodiles are mentioned several times in the 2005 novel The History of Love by Nicole Krauss, with a version of Schulz (having survived the Holocaust) playing a supporting role.

== Mural controversy ==
In February 2001, Benjamin Geissler, a German documentary filmmaker, discovered the mural that Schulz had created for Landau. Polish conservation workers, who had begun the meticulous task of restoration, informed Yad Vashem, Israel's official Holocaust remembrance authority, of the findings. In May of that year, representatives of Yad Vashem went to Drohobych to examine the mural. They removed five fragments of it and transported them to Jerusalem.

International controversy ensued. Yad Vashem said that parts of the mural were legally purchased, but the owner of the property said that no such agreement was made, and Yad Vashem did not obtain permission from the Ukrainian Ministry of Culture despite legal requirements. The fragments left in place by Yad Vashem have since been restored and, after touring Polish museums, are now part of the collection at the Bruno Schulz Museum in Drohobych.

This gesture by Yad Vashem instigated public outrage in Poland and Ukraine, where Schulz is a beloved figure.

The issue reached a settlement in 2008 when Israel recognised the works as "the property and cultural wealth" of Ukraine, and Ukraine's Drohobychyna Museum agreed to let Yad Vashem keep them as a long-term loan. In February 2009, Yad Vashem opened its display of the murals to the public.

== Sources ==
- Works by Bruno Schulz at Project Gutenberg (in the original Polish)
- Nebenjob "Wer erschoss Bruno Schultz?" on YouTube (Who shot Bruno Schulz? in the original German version)
- Translations by John Curran Davis, Schulzian.net
- Bruno Schulz's drawing and graphic works at malarze.com
- Bruno Schulz – BrunoSchulz.com
- Petri Liukkonen. "Bruno Schulz". Books and Writers.
- Bruno Schulz's Poetics: Quotes from his Letters and Other Writings NecessaryProse.com
- A Journey into the Underworld: An essay on the film The Hour-Glass Sanatorium
- Rodopi Press anthology: scholars discuss how Schulz fits into his cultural and historical landscape, 2009
- Bruno Schulz at Culture.pl
- The Street of Crocodiles an animated film by the Brothers Quay.
- novel: Agadát Bruno VeAdela [legend of Bruno and Adele] by Amir Gutfreund
