= The Cabinet of Jan Svankmajer =

1984 animated short film by Stephen Quay and Timothy Quay

- Directed by: Stephen Quay Timothy Quay; Keith Griffiths
- Written by: Stephen Quay; Timothy Quay
- Produced by: Keith Griffiths
- Cinematography: Stephen Quay; Timothy Quay
- Edited by: Stephen Quay; Timothy Quay
- Music by: Zdenek Liska
- Production company: Koninck Studios
- Distributed by: Zeitgeist Films
- Release date: 20 June 1984 (United Kingdom)
- Running time: 14 minutes
- Country: United Kingdom
- Language: English

The Cabinet of Jan Svankmajer is a 1984 British surreal short stop-motion film by the Brothers Quay, an homage to the influential short film maker Jan Švankmajer.

The film was released on 20 June 1984, in the United Kingdom.

== Summary ==
It is structured as a series of little lessons on perception at Prague in a form of a puppet simulacrum of Svankmajer, whose head is an opened book, to a doll whose head the masters empties of dross and refills with a similar open book.

== Availability ==
Available as part of the Phantom Museums DVD collection of Quay Brothers shorts.

The short film was released, alongside other shorts by the Quay Brothers, on May 14, 2020, on The Criterion Channel.
