= Tony Miller (cinematographer) =

British cinematographer

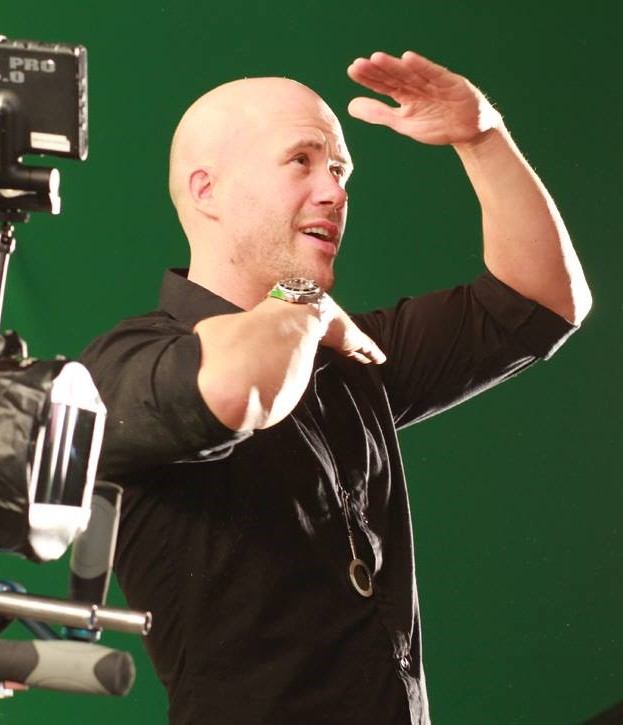
Image of Tony C. Miller

Tony Miller is an English cinematographer and documentary filmmaker. He directed Mustang: The Hidden Kingdom, a Discovery Channel documentary narrated by Harrison Ford, following an emissary sent by the Dalai Lama to the then closed kingdom of Mustang.

== Selected filmography ==
=== Cinematographer ===
- Carnival Row (2019)
- Fleabag (2016)
- Zen (2011)
- The Turn of the Screw (2009)
- Small Island (2009)
- The Meerkats (2008)
- Survivors (2008)
- In Love with Barbara (2008)
- The Passion (2008)
- I Really Hate My Job (2007)
- Infinite Justice (2006)
- The Honeytrap (2002)
- The Sandman (2000)
- Bramwell (1998)

=== Director ===
- Mustang: The Hidden Kingdom (1994)
