= The Doll's Breath =

2019 animated short film

- Directed by: Stephen Quay; Timothy Quay
- Written by: Stephen Quay; Timothy Quay
- Based on: "Las Hortensias" by Felisberto Hernández
- Produced by: Keith Griffiths
- Cinematography: Stephen Quay; Timothy Quay
- Edited by: Stephen Quay; Timothy Quay
- Music by: Michèle Bokanowski
- Production companies: Syncopy; Koninck Studios
- Distributed by: Zeitgeist Films
- Release date: 11 September 2019 (L'Étrange Festival)
- Running time: 22 minutes
- Country: United Kingdom

The Doll's Breath is a 2019 British short stop-motion animated film written and directed by Stephen and Timothy Quay. Based on the short story "Las Hortensias" (1949) by Felisberto Hernández, the film follows Horacio as he sets up complicated charades where women and life-sized dolls change places in a web of jealousy, betrayal and murder. The film premiered at the 25th L'Étrange Festival in Paris, France, on 11 September 2019, by Zeitgeist Films.

== Premise ==
Horacio, a former window dresser, sets up complicated charades where women and life-sized dolls change places in a web of jealousy, betrayal and murder.

== Production ==
In 2015, Syncopy and Zeitgeist Films teamed up to distribute several short films directed by Stephen and Timothy Quay. In 2016, Syncopy owners and executive producers Christopher Nolan and Emma Thomas commissioned The Doll's Breath from Stephen and Timothy Quay, with the stipulations that it would be "no longer than 30 minutes and shot on 35mm". Nolan also requested the Quay Brothers to script the short, which initially "followed the course of the story pretty strictly, but—as always when we work—at some point you have to just put the script down, and as you start to build the puppets, it takes its own course. You just guide it a little bit: shorten some things, get rid of some things". Nolan had previously written and directed a documentary short about the Quay Brothers, titled Quay (2015). The Doll's Breath contains no dialogue, as it "tells the story purely with images and music, even if it became abstract". It is based on the short story "Las Hortensias" (1949) by Felisberto Hernández. The Quay Brothers had previously adapted Hernández's work for their short film Unmistaken Hands: Ex Voto F.H. (2013). Michèle Bokanowski served as the composer for The Doll's Breath.

== Release ==
The Doll's Breath had its world premiere at the 25th L'Étrange Festival in Paris, France, on 11 September 2019, by Zeitgeist Films. The film also played at the 63rd BFI London Film Festival on 13 October 2019, the 62nd International Dok Leipzig Festival on 2 November 2019, and the 49th International Film Festival Rotterdam on 24 January 2020. (Note: Attributed to multiple sources:) In January 2020, the film also debuted on the streaming service Mubi for a limited time, as part of a partnership with the 49th International Film Festival Rotterdam. The film also played at the 21st Jeonju International Film Festival, as part of the "Quay Brothers: Welcome to the Dormitorium" exhibition, from 21 July 2020 to 4 October 2020. In March 2025, the stop-motion puppets used for The Doll's Breath, as well as other films from the Quay Brothers, were put on display at the "Dormitorium – The Film Décors of The Quay Brothers" exhibition, at Bloomsbury's Swedenborg House, as part of the 23rd Polish Film Festival.

=== Critical response ===
Geoff Andrew gave a positive review of the film's puppetry, writing "the fantastic, enigmatic tableaux of grotesque characters (some more or less human, some not at all, some impressively weird hybrids) ... such is the meticulous, almost absurdly detailed assemblage of the hand-crafted figures in their likewise painstakingly hand-crafted landscapes that one is overtaken by a strange sense of life not extinguished but temporarily put on pause". Alex Dudok de Wit of Move Madly praised Bokanowski's score, specifically how "its dissonant jabs and sub-auditory rumbles speak jealousy and paranoia in the absence of any dialogue".
