= Sanatorium Under the Sign of the Hourglass =

1937 novel by Bruno Schulz

- First US edition
- Author: Bruno Schulz
- Original title: Sanatorium Pod Klepsydrą
- Translator: Celina Wieniewska
- Language: Polish
- Publisher: Walker and Co (US)
- Publication date: 1937
- Publication place: Poland
- English publication date: 1978
- Media type: Print (Hardback & Paperback)
- Pages: 200 pp (paperback edition)

Sanatorium Under the Sign of the Hourglass (Polish: Sanatorium Pod Klepsydrą) is a 1937 novel by the Polish writer and painter Bruno Schulz.

== Plot introduction ==
The novel takes the form of a collection of dreamlike, poetic short stories that reflect on the death of the narrator's father, as well as life in the modest Jewish quarter of Drohobycz, the provincial town in the Austro-Hungarian Empire where Schulz was born. The hourglass of the title refers to the use of this object as a symbol in obituaries and death notices among the Poles.

== Plot summary ==
In "Father's Last Escape," the concluding story of the novel, Schulz makes an explicit reference to Franz Kafka's The Metamorphosis (Schulz helped his one-time fiancee translate Kafka's The Trial into Polish, a translation for which Schulz provided an introduction). The old man's business has been liquidated and all his functions and authorities taken over by his wife or relatives. Even the pretty, young Polish maid Adela has gone and been replaced by Genya, "anemic, pale, and boneless,…and so absent-minded that she sometimes made a white sauce from old letters and invoices." Father's response is to turn himself first into wallpaper, then a piece of clothing, and finally into a big crablike insect who — unlike Kafka's passive victim — runs around the house, searching endlessly for something. His wife can catch the creature in her handkerchief sometimes, but cannot hold him. One day, however, she must have managed because Father appears at lunch, as the main course, after which he escapes the table, never to be seen again.

== Film, TV or theatrical adaptations ==
- The Hourglass Sanatorium, a 1973 film based on several Schulz stories.
- Sanatorium Under the Sign of the Hourglass, a 2024 film by the Brothers Quay combining stop-motion animation and live action.

== Music inspired by this work ==
- Sanatorium Under the Sign of the Hourglass: A Tribute to Bruno Schultz - The Cracow Klezmer Band Plays John Zorn, performed by The Cracow Klezmer Band. Composed by John Zorn. Tzadik Records TZ-7349
- On 19 November 2024 (the 82nd anniversary of the murder of Bruno Schulz), composer Timothy Nelson released Always Night Here (Music Inspired by the Writings & Drawings of Bruno Schulz, Volume One), Ghost Print Of It (Music Inspired by the Writings & Drawings of Bruno Schulz, Volume Two), Nest Upended (Music Inspired by the Writings & Drawings of Bruno Schulz, Volume Three), and Slowly Rising Swallow (Music Inspired by the Writings & Drawings of Bruno Schulz, Volume Four), four volumes of music recorded between 2007 and 2024 for the soundtrack of the third feature-length film by the Brothers Quay, Sanatorium Under the Sign of the Hourglass.
