= Tadeusz Kondrat =

Polish actor

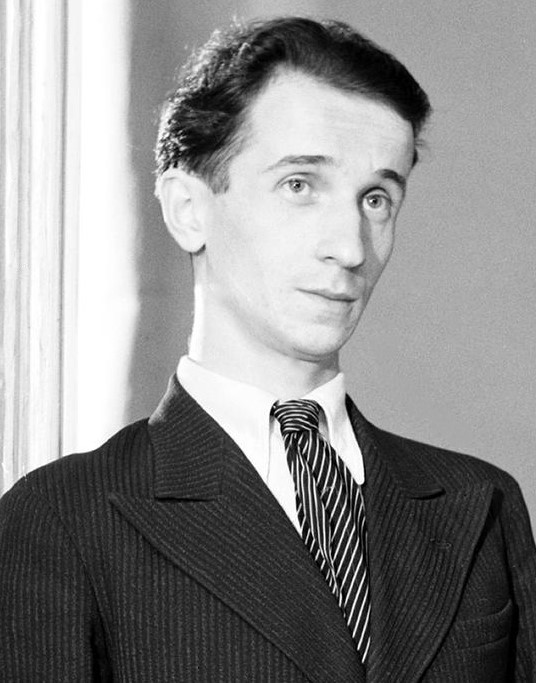
- Born: 8 April 1908; Prömsel, Austria-Hungary (now Przemyśl, Poland)
- Died: 19 June 1994 (aged 86); Skolimów (part of Konstancin-Jeziorna), Poland
- Occupation: Actor
- Years active: 1954–1979

Tadeusz Kondrat (8 April 1908 – 19 June 1994) was a Polish actor. He appeared in more than 20 films between 1954 and 1979.

== Selected filmography ==
- Kwiecień (1961)
- Lalka (1968), as Szlangbaum
- The Hourglass Sanatorium (1973)
