= The Sandman (2000 film) =

2000 dance film

- Directed by: Stephen Quay Timothy Quay; William Tuckett
- Written by: Stephen Quay; Timothy Quay
- Based on: "The Sandman" by E. T. A. Hoffmann
- Produced by: Keith Griffiths
- Starring: Tamara Rojo; Irek Mukhamedov; Heathcote Williams; Zenaida Yanowsky
- Cinematography: Tony Miller
- Edited by: Simon Laurie
- Production company: Koninck Studios
- Release date: 2000
- Running time: 41 minutes
- Country: United Kingdom
- Language: English

The Sandman is a 2000 dance film made by the Brothers Quay and William Tuckett.

A televised ballet, it stars Tamara Rojo, Irek Mukhamedov, Zenaida Yanowsky, and Heathcote Williams.

It is loosely based on E. T. A. Hoffmann's story "The Sandman".
