= Felix Landau =

Austrian SS officer (1910–1983)

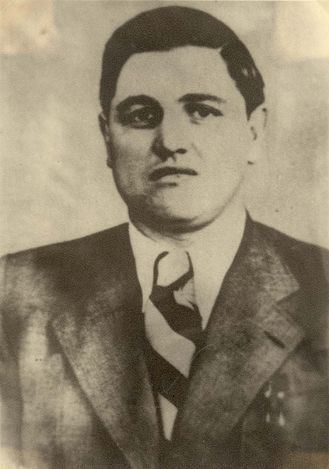
- Born: May 21, 1910; Vienna, Austria-Hungary
- Died: April 20, 1983 (aged 72); Vienna, Austria
- Occupation: SS Hauptscharführer
- Known for: Documenting his activities in the Einsatzkommando in his diary
- Status: Deceased
- Conviction: Murder
- Penalty: Life imprisonment with hard labour

Felix Landau (May 21, 1910 – April 20, 1983) was an SS Hauptscharführer, a member of an Einsatzkommando during World War II, based first in Lwów, Poland (today Lviv, Ukraine), and later in Drohobycz. Landau was a participant in numerous mass shooting of Galician Jews. He is known for his daily diary and for temporarily sparing the life of the Jewish/Polish artist Bruno Schulz in 1942. Landau liked Schulz's art and supplied him with protection and extra food. In return, he ordered the artist to paint a set of murals for his young son's bedroom, depicting scenes from the Brothers Grimm fairy tales. Landau also was the SS officer assigned to watch over Maria Altmann, the subject of the 2015 film Woman in Gold.

== Early career ==
Born as the illegitimate child of Paul Stipkowich and Maria Maier, Felix Richard Landau received the surname of his Jewish stepfather after his mother had married Jakob Landau in 1911. In 1925, Landau joined National Socialist Youth and was expelled from apprentice boarding school (run by a Catholic lay order) for active recruitment activities. In 1930 he joined Austrian Bundesheer (2nd Dragoner Squadron). In March 1931 he joined NSDAP and in May became a political leader of a local Nazi army district. In June 1933 was expelled from Bundesheer for Nazi activities. From June 1933 to April 1934, Landau was a member of Sturmabteilung, after that in SS. During the July Putsch in 1934, Landau was a member of the group which stormed the Federal Chancellery of Austria, holding several staff members under guard with a submachine gun. After the coup's failure, Landau was arrested and sent to Wöllersdorf detention camp. Landau was conditionally released under an amnesty on February 17, 1937. The conditions of his release were stringent, requiring him to report to the authorities on a daily basis, not go outside after 8:00 PM, not use a telephone or any kind of transportation. He was also not allowed to hold a job and was prohibited from receiving unemployment benefits. As a result, Landau fled from Austria to Germany in April 1937. He became a naturalized German citizen, got married, and worked as a police assistant in the Gestapo.

== World War II and service in Einsatzkommando ==
In 1940, Landau transferred to KdS/SD in Radom governed by the General Government where he met typist Gertrude, to whom he later addressed his letters.

In June 1941, Felix Landau volunteered for Einsatzkommando service. He began his diary in July 1941, interspersing sentimental letters to his fiancée with detailed records of his participation in actions related to the Holocaust. He describes "shooting exercises" and "wild actions", shooting sprees wherein he and his men would pick off random Jews who worked nearby or passed by on the street. In one such event in November 1942, Landau killed the personal dentist of a fellow officer, Karl Günther. In revenge, Günther caught up with Bruno Schulz, then under the protection of Landau, and shot him twice in the head. According to Schulz's friend Izydor Friedman, who witnessed the death, this happened at the corner of Czacki and Mickiewicz Streets. Later, Günther told Landau: "You killed my Jew - I killed yours."

At the end of 1941, he lived with Gertrude in an aristocratic villa. He divorced his first wife in 1942 and married Gertrude in 1943 (divorced in 1946). Until May 1943, Landau was in charge of organizing Jewish labor.

== After World War II ==
In 1946, a former worker recognized him in Linz. Landau was arrested by the Americans but escaped from Glasenbach prison camp in August 1947. Under the name of Rudolf Jaschke, he started an interior decorating company in Bavaria.

In August 1958, Landau was arrested and accused of participating in massacres. In 1962, he was found guilty of murder and sentenced to life imprisonment by the Stuttgart Assize Court. Landau was released from prison in 1973, and died in 1983. He was buried in the Hernalser Cemetery in Vienna, Austria.

== Quotes from the diary ==
- Lwow - 5 July 1941... There were hundreds of Jews walking along the street with blood pouring down their faces, holes in their heads, their hands broken and their eyes hanging out of their sockets. They were covered in blood. Some were carrying others who had collapsed. We went to the citadel; there we saw things that few people have ever seen. At the entrance to the citadel there were soldiers standing guard. They were holding clubs as thick as a man's wrist and were lashing out and hitting anyone who crossed their path. The Jews were pouring out of the entrance. There were rows of Jews lying one on top of the other like pigs, whimpering horribly. The Jews kept streaming out of the citadel completely covered in blood. We stopped and tried to see who was in charge of the Kommando. Nobody. Someone had let the Jews go. They were just being hit out of rage and hatred...
- Drohobycz - 12 July 1941... At 6:00 in the morning I was suddenly awoken from a deep sleep. Report for an execution. Fine, so I'll just play executioner and then gravedigger, why not?... Twenty-three had to be shot, amongst them ... two women ... We had to find a suitable spot to shoot and bury them. After a few minutes we found a place. The death candidates assembled with shovels to dig their own graves. Two of them were weeping. The others certainly have incredible courage... Strange, I am completely unmoved. No pity, nothing. That's the way it is and then it's all over... Valuables, watches and money are put into a pile... The two women are lined up at one end of the grave ready to be shot first... As the women walked to the grave they were completely composed. They turned around. Six of us had to shoot them. The job was assigned thus: three at the heart, three at the head. I took the heart. The shots were fired and the brains whizzed through the air. Two in the head is too much. They almost tear it off...

== See also ==
- List of prison escapes
