= Brothers Quay =

American animators and filmmakers (born 1947)

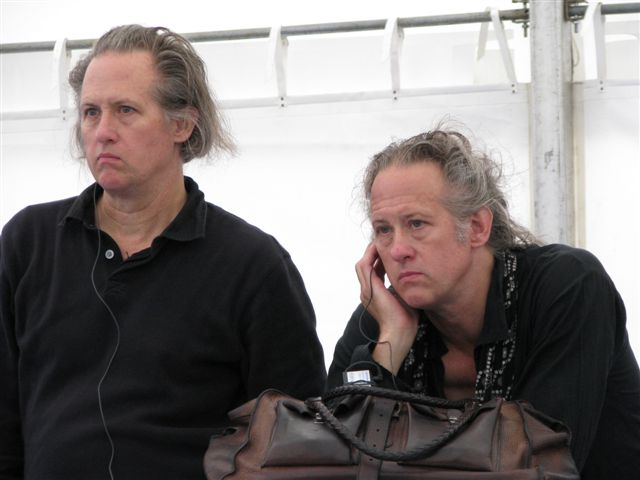
- The Brothers Quay in 2010
- Born: Stephen Quay; Timothy Quay; June 17, 1947 (age 79); Norristown, Pennsylvania, U.S.
- Occupations: Film directors; animators; writers; production designers; cinematographers; editors
- Years active: 1979–present

Stephen Quay and Timothy Quay (/kweɪ/ KWAY; born June 17, 1947) are American identical twin brothers and stop-motion animators who are better known as the Brothers Quay or Quay Brothers. They received the 1998 Drama Desk Award for Outstanding Set Design for their work on the play The Chairs.

== Careers ==
The Quay Brothers reside and work in England, having moved there in 1969 to study at the Royal College of Art, London after studying illustration (Timothy) and film (Stephen) at the Philadelphia College of Art, later the University of the Arts in Philadelphia. In England, they made their first short films, which no longer exist after the only prints were irreparably damaged. They spent some time in the Netherlands in the 1970s and then returned to England, where they teamed up with another Royal College student, Keith Griffiths, who produced all of their films. In 1980, the trio formed Koninck Studios, which is currently based in London's Old Street area of Hackney.

== Style ==
The Brothers' works from 1979 to the present show a wide range of often esoteric influences, starting with the Polish animators Walerian Borowczyk and Jan Lenica and continuing with the writers Franz Kafka, Bruno Schulz, Robert Walser and Michel de Ghelderode, puppeteers Wladyslaw Starewicz and Czech Richard Teschner and Czech composers Leoš Janáček, Zdeněk Liška and Polish Leszek Jankowski, the last of whom has created many original scores for their work. Czech animator Jan Švankmajer, for whom they named one of their films (The Cabinet of Jan Svankmajer), is also frequently cited as a major influence, but they actually discovered his work relatively late, in 1983, by which time their characteristic style and preoccupations had been fully formed. In a panel discussion with Daniel Bird and Andrzej Klimowski at the Aurora festival in Norwich, they emphasized that a more significant influence on their work was Walerian Borowczyk, who made both animation shorts and live-action features.

Most of their animation films feature puppets made of doll parts and other organic and inorganic materials, often partially disassembled, in a dark, moody atmosphere. Perhaps their best known work is Street of Crocodiles (1986), based on the short story of the same name by the Polish author and artist Bruno Schulz. This short film was selected by director and animator Terry Gilliam as one of the ten best animated films of all time, and critic Jonathan Romney included it on his list of the ten best films in any medium (for Sight and Sound's critics' poll of 2002). They have made two full-length live action films: Institute Benjamenta, or This Dream People Call Human Life (1996), produced by Keith Griffiths and Janine Marmot, and The Piano Tuner of Earthquakes (2005), produced by Keith Griffiths. They also directed an animated sequence in the film Frida (2002).

With very few exceptions, their films have no meaningful spoken dialogue (most have no spoken content at all, while some, such as The Comb (From the Museums of Sleep) (1990) include multilingual background gibberish that is not intended to be coherently understood). Accordingly, their films are highly reliant on their music scores, of which many have been written especially for them by the Polish composer Leszek Jankowski. In 2000, they contributed a short film to the BBC's Sound On Film series in which they visualised a 20-minute piece by the avant-garde composer Karlheinz Stockhausen. Whenever possible, the Quay Brothers prefer to work with pre-recorded music, though Gary Tarn's score for The Phantom Museum had to be added afterwards when it became impossible to license music by the Czech composer Zdeněk Liška.

They have created music videos for His Name Is Alive ("Are We Still Married", "Can't Go Wrong Without You"), Michael Penn ("Long Way Down (Look What the Cat Drug In)") and 16 Horsepower ("Black Soul Choir"). Their style has been mimicked to the point that audiences mistakenly believed that the Quay Brothers were responsible for several music videos for Tool but those videos were created by Fred Stuhr and member Adam Jones, whose work is influenced by the Quay Brothers. Although they worked on Peter Gabriel's seminal video "Sledgehammer" (1986) as animators, the project was directed by Stephen R. Johnson in order for the brothers to continue to support their personal projects.

Before turning to film, the Quay Brothers worked as professional illustrators. The first edition of Anthony Burgess' novel The Clockwork Testament, or Enderby's End, included their drawings before the start of each chapter. Nearly three decades before directly collaborating with Stockhausen, they designed the cover of the book Stockhausen: Conversations with the Composer (ed. Jonathan Cott, Simon & Schuster, 1973). After designing book covers for Gothic and science fiction books while in Philadelphia, the Quay Brothers have created suggestive designs for a variety of publications that seem to reflect not only their own interests in particular authors, covers for Italo Calvino, Louis-Ferdinand Céline or Mark le Fanu's study of the films of Andrei Tarkovsky, but also in themes and motifs that these authors develop. Literary texts are inspirational sources for almost all of their film projects, whether they serve as a point of departure for their own ideas or as a textual basis for filmic scenarios, and not as scripts or screenplays. The prowess in illustration and calligraphy seeps increasingly into many formal elements in their later films, evident as graphic embellishment in the set decoration, or their particular use of patterns in the puppets' costume design. Titles, intertitles and credits appear in a variety of handwritten styles.

In an interview with Robert K. Elder for his book The Best Film You've Never Seen, the Quay Brothers discuss their creative process, stating: "If [a] project does eventually get approval, then we almost invariably chuck [the] original proposal out, not out of any cavalierness, but simply because we know that, as we start building the decors and the puppets, the script begins to grow and evolve very organically."

The critical success of Street of Crocodiles gave the Quay Brothers artistic freedom to explore a shift in subject matter, in part originating in literary and poetic sources that led to exploration of new aesthetic forms, but also because they were able to make extensive experiments in technique, both with cameras and on large stage sets. The Quay Brothers are best known for their puppet and feature-length films. Less known, but no less incisive in their creative development, is their intense engagement in stage design for opera, ballet and theatre: since 1988, the Quay Brothers have created sets and projections for performing arts productions on international stages. Their work at miniature scale has translated into large-scale designs for the theatre and opera productions of director Richard Jones: Prokofiev's The Love for Three Oranges; Feydeau's "A Flea in Her Ear"; Tchaikovsky's Mazeppa; and Molière's "Le Bourgeois Gentilhomme". Their set design for a revival of Ionesco's "The Chairs" was nominated for a Tony Award in 1998. The Quay Brothers' excursion into feature films and live-action dance films were not an indication of a move away from animation and the literature that inspires them—on the contrary, the film explores the potential which slumbers in the combination of these cinematic techniques. Their puppet animation set designs have been curated as an internationally touring exhibition called "Dormitorium" which toured the east coast of the United States in 2009, including the originating venue of the Rosenwald-Wolf Gallery at the University of the Arts, Philadelphia, followed by Parsons The New School of Design, New York, Old Dominion University, Norfolk, VA and Cornell University, Ithaca, NY.

== Literature ==
The Quay Brothers are strongly influenced by literature and the written word – from Eastern-European poetry to South American magic realism.

- Lewis Carroll (Alice in Not So Wonderland)
- Emma Hauck (In Absentia)
- Felisberto Hernández (Unmistaken Hands: Ex Voto F.H, The Doll's Breath)
- Franz Kafka (The Metamorphosis)
- Stanisław Lem (Maska)
- Rainer Maria Rilke (Eurydice: She, So Beloved)
- Bruno Schulz (Street of Crocodiles, Sanatorium Under the Sign of the Hourglass)
- Robert Walser (The Comb, Institute Benjamenta)

== Music ==
Music is an essential part of the Quay Brothers' films, as they also find inspiration in Eastern European classical music. The Quay Brothers' films feature music by the following composers:

- Stefan Cichoński (Nocturna Artificialia)
- Trevor Duncan (Piano Tuner of Earthquakes)
- Leoš Janáček (Leoš Janáček: Intimate Excursions, The Sandman, The Metamorphosis)
- Lech Jankowski (Street of Crocodiles, Rehearsals for Extinct Anatomies, Ex-Voto, The Comb, Institute Benjamenta, De Artificiali Perspectiva, or Anamorphosis)
- Zygmunt Konieczny (Nocturna Artificialia)
- György Kurtag (The Sandman)
- Zdeněk Liška (The Cabinet of Jan Švankmajer, The Phantom Museum)
- Steve Martland (Songs for Dead Children)
- Claudio Monteverdi (Eurydice: She, So Beloved)
- Timothy Nelson (Wonderwood, Through The Weeping Glass, Unmistaken Hands: Ex Voto F.H., Vade mecum, Sanatorium Under the Sign of the Hourglass)
- Arvo Pärt (Duet)
- Krzysztof Penderecki (Ein Brudermord, Inventorium of Traces, Maska)
- Sergei Prokofiev (Alice in Not So Wonderland)
- Christopher Slaski (Piano Tuner of Earthquakes)
- Karlheinz Stockhausen (In Absentia)
- Igor Stravinski (Igor, The Paris Years Chez Pleyel 1920–1929)
- Gary Tarn (The Phantom Museum, Tempus Fugit)
- Antonio Vivaldi (Piano Tuner of Earthquakes)
- Michèle Bokanowski (The Doll's Breath)
- Alfred Schnittke (Sanatorium Under the Sign of the Hourglass)

== Legacy ==
In 2010, the College of Physicians of Philadelphia received a Philadelphia Exhibitions Initiative grant through The Pew Center for Arts & Heritage for an exhibitions project that would include a new work by the Quay Brothers. The Quay Brothers produced a new film entitled Through the Weeping Glass: On the Consolations of Life Everlasting (Limbos & Afterbreezes in the Mütter Museum). The film is their first made in the United States, produced by Edward Waisnis through his company PRO BONO films in collaboration with Atelier Koninck QBFZ, London and it focuses on the history and collections of the college's famed Mütter Museum. The film, with narration by Derek Jacobi and a musical score by Timothy Nelson, was shot on location in Philadelphia during the summer of 2010 and premiered in autumn 2011, with symposia, at The College of Physicians of Philadelphia in Pennsylvania; New York City's Museum of Modern Art; and the Museum of Jurassic Technology in Los Angeles. The film was subsequently shown at the Wellcome Collection, London, England; the CFC Worldwide Short Film Festival in Toronto, Canada; The Institute of Contemporary Art, Boston, MA; The Museum of Fine Arts, Houston, TX; and at the Wexner Center of the Arts at Ohio State University, Columbus, OH. It was reviewed in both Sight & Sound and Film Comment. The 35mm negative and print were selected for inclusion in the film collection of the Museum of Modern Art.

The Quay Brothers were commissioned by Leeds Canvas, a group of eight cultural organisations in Leeds, UK, to create in May 2012 a major citywide art installation, OverWorlds & UnderWorlds. The commission was one of twelve 'Artists Taking the Lead' projects around the UK, Arts Council England's flagship contribution to the London 2012 Cultural Olympiad. Later in the same year, the Quay Brothers were the subject of a grand retrospective exhibition at the Museum of Modern Art, New York entitled Quay Brothers: On Deciphering the Pharmacist's Prescription for Lip-Reading Puppets which featured work spanning their entire career, tracing back as early as childhood, with much of the material shown for the first time. Organized by Ron Magliozzi, Associate Curator of MoMA's Film Department, the exhibition ran from August 12, 2012, through January 7, 2013 and included a full coinciding film program.

In 2013, the Quay Brothers were recipients of a residency program award at the Wexner Center of the Arts, Columbus, Ohio. The project they undertook coinciding with this residency was a puppet animation film entitled: Unmistaken Hands: Ex Voto F.H.–that revolves around the work and life of Uruguayan writer Felisberto Hernández, often referred to as the father of 'magic realism', and for whose work the Quay Brothers share an affinity. The production was overseen by Edward Waisnis through PRO BONO films, in collaboration with Atelier Koninck QBFZ, and the support of the Fundación Felisberto Hernández, and features a score composed by Timothy Nelson, who has worked with the Quay Brothers previously. As of January 2014, the Quay Brothers have been in production with The Digital Toy Company on a joint film/video-game project entitled Asleep: I Hear My Name.

The Quay Brothers' work was exhibited in two further major international exhibitions in 2013/2014. The first, The Quay Brothers' Universum was the Quay Brothers' first 'solo' exhibition in Europe and took place at the EYE Film Institute Netherlands, Amsterdam from December 15, 2013 – March 9, 2014. The second, Metamorfosis. Visiones Fantásticas de Starewitch, Švankmajer y Los Hermanos Quay was held at the Centre de Cultura Contemporània de Barcelona, Barcelona (25 March – 7 September 2014) and La Casa Encendida (2 October 2014 – 11 January 2015), Madrid, respectively. The exhibition was curated by Spanish animation curator, programmer and historian Carolina López Caballero and was a major exploration of the art of stop motion animation, placing the Quay Brothers' work alongside Russian-born puppet animation godfather Ladislas Starevich and Czech surrealist master Jan Švankmajer.

Hollywood director Christopher Nolan revealed himself to have been an admirer of the Quay Brothers' work since coming across their films late at night when they were originally screened on Channel 4 in the UK. In 2015, Nolan curated a theatrical tour showcasing newly restored 35mm prints of the Quay's films In Absentia, The Comb and Street of Crocodiles. The programme also included the eight-minute 'documentary' Quay (2015) which Nolan directed as an homage to the twins. The programme and Nolan's short received critical acclaim, with Indiewire writing in their review that the Quay Brothers "will undoubtedly have hundreds, if not thousands more fans because of Nolan, and for that The Quay Brothers in 35mm will always be one of latter's most important contributions to cinema".

Directly after the launch of the 35mm programme in the states, the Quay Brothers were celebrated at the Bristol Festival of Puppetry, UK (August – September 2015). A retrospective of their work was curated by animation director Joseph Wallace, who also hosted a conversation with the Quay Brothers about the relationship between their animation and stage work at Watershed (Bristol). Wallace, along with Puppet Place (the organisation behind the festival), also commissioned the Quay Brothers to create an installation which ran for the duration of the festival and was displayed in a disused control room on a bridge in the centre of Bristol entitled: Homage To The Framed Perspective of an Abridged Conversation Between the Painters Sassetta & Uccello and the Mystical Occurrence that Happened Before Your Arrival..

The Quay Brothers collaborated with Louis Andriessen in 2016 and designed decors for his opera Theatre of The World which premiered at the Walt Disney Concert Hall in Los Angeles before playing at the Carré Theatre in Amsterdam as part of the Holland Festival. As well as the design, the Quay Brothers also produced animated projections which accompanied the performance.

In October 2016, a two disk Blu-ray collection of the Quay Brothers films dating 1979–2013 entitled "Inner Sanctums" was released by the British Film Institute. The edition includes 24 of the Quay Brothers' short films, of which three are UK premieres and five are world premieres, along with a disk of special features including footnotes, interviews, rare behind the scenes films and Christopher Nolan's short portrait of the brothers; Quay (2015).

== Awards and honours ==
Film	Awards
Punch And Judy: Tragical Comedy or Comical Tragedy	Annecy Prix Émile Reynaud (1983)
Street of Crocodiles	Cannes International Film Festival, nominated for the Golden Palm (1986) Zagreb World Festival of Animation Films, 3 awards (1986) Catalan International Film Festival, Sitges: Caixa de Catalunya (Best Film SF) (1986) MFF w Odense: Grand Prix for Best Fairytale Film (1986) Festival International Du Film & De Science Fiction, Bruksela: Grand Prix (1986) San Francisco International Film Festival: Grand Prix, Best Short Film (1986) MFF Fantasporto, International Fantasy Film Award (1987)
Rehearsals for Extinct Anatomies	San Francisco: Best Experimental Film (1988)
The Comb	Oberhausen International Short Film Festival: Grand Prix (1990)
De Artificiali Perspectiva Or Anamorphosis	Nominated for BAFTA Film Award (1992)
Institute Benjamenta	IFF Special Mention Locarno Main Competition & Youth Jury: The Second Prize (1995) Stockholm International Film Festival: Grand Prix (1995)
In Absentia	Official Selection – Directors Fortnight, Cannes International Film Festival (2000) Nominated for the Prix Italia, Best Music Film for Television (2000) Lipsku International Film Festival: Golden Dove Award (2000) Tampere International Film Festival: Special Jury Award (2000) Montreal International Film Festival: Special Jury Mention (2000) Prague International Film Festival: Golden Prague Award (2000) Kraków Film Festival: Honorary Diploma Award 50th Melbourne International Film Festival: Best Short Film Turkey International Film Festival: Grand Prix {Ex Aequo} Sitges International Film Festival – Festival Internacional de Cinema de Catalunya: Best Short Film (2001) British Animation Awards – Best Film: Cutting Edge (2002) Palmars, Classique en Images, Prix Sacem, Paris (2002)
The Piano Tuner of Earthquakes	Locarno International Film Festival: Special Mention, Main Competition & Jury des Jeunes (2005) Sitges International Film Festival – Festival Internacional de Cinema de Catalunya (for Best Special Effects) (2005)

== Filmography ==
Feature films

- Institute Benjamenta, or This Dream People Call Human Life (1995)
- The Piano Tuner of Earthquakes (2005)
- Sanatorium Under the Sign of the Hourglass (2024)

Short films

- Nocturne Artificialia: Those Who Desire Without End (1979)
- Rain Dance (1980) – a short film for Sesame Street
- Punch and Judy: Tragical Comedy or Comical Tragedy (1980)
- Ein Brudermord (1980)
- The Eternal Day of Michel de Ghelderode (1981)
- Igor, The Paris Years Chez Pleyel (1983)
- Leoš Janáček: Intimate Excursions (1983)
- The Cabinet of Jan Svankmajer (1984)
- The Epic of Gilgamesh, or This Unnameable Little Broom (1985) – full title: Little Songs of the Chief Officer of Hunar Louse, or This Unnameable Little Broom, being a Largely Disguised Reduction of the Epic of Gilgamesh
- Street of Crocodiles (1986)
- Rehearsals for Extinct Anatomies (1988)
- Stille Nacht I: Dramolet (1988)
- Ex-Voto (1989)
- The Comb (From the Museums of Sleep) (1990)
- De Artificiali Perspectiva, or Anamorphosis (1991)
- The Calligrapher (1991) – an ident commissioned by BBC2 which was later rejected and never broadcast
- Stille Nacht III: Tales From Vienna Woods (1992)
- The Summit (1995)
- Duet - Variations for the Convalescence of 'A' (2000)
- The Sandman (2000)
- In Absentia (2000)
- Frida (2002) – animated contribution (dir: Julie Taymor)
- Songs for Dead Children (2003)
- The Phantom Museum: Random Forays Into the Vaults of Sir Henry Wellcome's Medical Collection (2003)
- Alice in Not So Wonderland (2007)
- Eurydice: She, So Beloved (2007)
- Inventorium of Traces (2009)
- Maska (2010)
- Bartók Béla: Sonata for Solo Violin (2011)
- Through the Weeping Glass: On the Consolations of Life Everlasting (Limbos & Afterbreezes in the Mütter Museum) (2011)
- The Metamorphosis (2012)
- Unmistaken Hands: Ex Voto F.H. (2013)
- Asleep: I Hear My Name (2014)
- The Doll's Breath (2019)
- Vade mecum (2020)
- 11 Preliminary Orbits Around Planet Lem (2021)

Music videos

- Sledgehammer – Peter Gabriel (1986) – animated contribution (dir: Stephen R. Johnson)
- Stille Nacht II: Are We Still Married? – His Name is Alive (1991)
- Long Way Down (Look What The Cat Drug In) – Michael Penn (1992)
- Stille Nacht IV: Can't Go Wrong Without You – His Name is Alive (1993)
- "Black Soul Choir – 16 Horsepower (1996)
- Stille Nacht V: Dog Door – Sparklehorse (2001)
- Ubu Roi – Pere Ubu (2008) – projected music video for live show
- Muslingauze – DJ Spooky (2008–2010)
- Stille Nacht V: Starman – Sabisha (2008–2010)

Commercials

- The Repeat Prescription Report (2017) Pharmacy2U
- Tempus Fugit (2016) Slow Time, L'effet
- Kinoteka 12 ident, (2014) Polish Film Festival, London
- Wonderwood (2010) Comme des Garçons
- Kinoteka 7 ident (2009) Polish Film Festival, London
- Mistletoe Kisses (2007) Galaxy, Mars, Inc.
- NHL, Laundromat (2001) Fox Sports
- NHL, Library (2001) Fox Sports
- Magnets (2001) Chili's
- Rice Krispies Treats – Float (2000) Kellogg's
- Pitney Chairs (1999) Pitney
- Northern Rock (1999) Northern Rock
- Mars Celebration (1998) Mars, Inc.
- Fox and Crow (1998) Badoit
- Lion and Zebra (1998) Badoit
- Weed Families (1998) Roundup
- Weeds (1998) Roundup
- Doritos idents (1997) Frito-Lay
- The Wooden Box That Collapses (title sequence) (1997) The End
- Lockets Metallica (1996) Mars, Inc.
- Swallow (1996) Murphy's Irish Stout
- Warriors (1996) Murphy's Irish Stout
- Brainfreeze (1995) 7-Eleven Slurpee
- Blue Cross (1995) Blue Cross Blue Shield Association.
- Dolls (1994) The Partnership for a Drug Free America
- Trees (1993) Coca-Cola
- Le Bourgeois Gentilhomme (title sequence) (1993) The End
- Fun Touch (1989) Nikon
- Zenith (1988) MTV
- MTV ident (1988) MTV
- BFI ident (1998) British Film Institute
- Skips (1988) K.P. Skips
- Dulux (1987) Dulux
- Walkers Crisps (1986) Walkers
- Honeywell (1986) Honeywell Computers

Student Films

- Untitled (travel films). c. 1970s. 8mm.
- Frequenzen, Detonation, Stille USA, c. 1975-76. 16mm.
- Venable Lewellyn’s Last Waltz UK, c. 1972. 16mm. Live action.
- Palais en Flammes UK, 1972. 16mm. Paper animation.
- Il Duetto UK, 1971. 16mm. Paper animation.
- Der Loop Der Loop UK, 1971. 16mm. Paper animation.
- Pohadka (Fairy Tale). USA/UK, c. 1968-69. 16mm. Paper animation.
- Golgatha USA/UK, c. 1968-69. 16mm. Paper animation.
- In the Mist (How Strange Was My Love, Fantasie Part 1) USA, c. 1969. 16mm. Live action.
- Muskrat USA, c. 1967-68. 16mm. Live action.

Appearances

- The Falls (1980)
- Quay (2015)

== Opera, ballet and stage ==
- The Birthday Party (2018) By Harold Pinter, directed by Ian Rickson at the Harold Pinter Theatre, London.
- Theatre of the World (2016) By Louis Andriessen, directed by Pierre Audi. Dutch National Opera, Amsterdam/Holland Festival, Amsterdam.
- An Evening at the Talk House (2015) By Wallace Shawn, directed by Ian Rickson at the National Theatre, London.
- Overworlds & Underworlds (2012) A Leeds Canvas initiative for the 2012 Cultural Olympiad, Leeds.
- I Looked Back When I Reached Halfway (2011) Collaboration with violinist Alina Ibragimova on Béla Bartók's Sonata for Violin (1944). Chetham's School of Music/Manchester International Festival, Manchester; Wilton's Music Hall, London.
- Bring Me the Head of Ubu Roi (2008) Projections for Pere Ubu. Queen Elizabeth Hall, London.
- Paul Bunyan (2007) By Benjamin Britten, directed by Nicholas Broadhurst. Theater am Kornmarkt Bregenz/Theater Luzern.
- Pinocchio (2006) By Martin Ward, choreographed and directed by Will Tuckett. Royal Opera House, London.
- The Cricket Recovers (2005) By Richard Ayres, directed by Nicholas Broadhurst. Aldeburgh Festival, Suffolk, and Almeida Opera, London.
- The Anatomy of a Storyteller (2004) Ballet by Kim Brandstrup. Royal Opera House, London.
- Death and Resurrection (2003) By J. S. Bach and Steve Martland, conducted by Sir John Eliot Gardiner, Steve Martland. Four short films illustrating Martland's Street Songs. Tate Modern and St. Paul's Cathedral, London.
- The Wind in the Willows (2002) Ballet by Will Tuckett. Royal Opera House, London.
- Queen of Spades (2001) Ballet by Kim Brandstrup. Les Grands Ballets Canadiens, Montreal.
- Bählamms Fest (1999) By Olga Neuwirth, directed by Nicholas Broadhurst. Wiener Festwochen, Vienna.
- The Chairs (1997) By Eugène Ionesco, directed by Simon McBurney. Theatre de Complicité and Royal Court, London and John Golden Theater, New York. (The Quay Brothers won the 1998 Drama Desk Award for Best Design and were also nominated for a Tony award)
- Cupid and Psyche (1997) Ballet by Kim Brandstrup. Royal Danish Ballet, Copenhagen.
- The Hour We Knew Nothing of Each Other (1996) By Peter Handke. Theater ballet directed by Kim Brandstrup. Malmo Dramatiska Theatre, Sweden.
- A Midsummer Night's Dream (1996) By William Shakespeare, directed by Jonathan Miller. Almeida Theatre, London.
- Le Bourgeois gentilhomme (1992) By Molière, directed by Richard Jones. Royal National Theatre, London
- Mazeppa (1991) By Pyotr Ilyich Tchaikovsky, directed by Richard Jones. Bregenz Festival/Nederlands Opera
- A Flea in Her Ear (1989) By Georges Feydeau, directed by Richard Jones. Old Vic, London.
- The Love for Three Oranges (1988) By Sergei Prokofiev, directed by Richard Jones. Opera North, Leeds/English National Opera, London.
- Dybbuk (1988) Ballet by Kim Brandstrup. The Place, London.

== Exhibitions ==
- Dormitorium: The Film Décors of the Quay Brothers. The Swedenborg Society, London, 2025
- Curfews An exhibition of 'The Black Drawings'. Tommy Simoens, Antwerp, 2017
- The Quay Brothers Phantom Museums. The Shoto Museum of Art, Tokyo, 2017
- Metamorphosis: Fantasy Visions in Starewitch, Švankmajer and the Quay Brothers CCCB, Barcelona, 2014
- The Quay Brothers Universum. The Eye, Amsterdam, 2013
- Quay Brothers: On Deciphering the Pharmacist's Prescription for Lip-Reading Puppets. Museum of Modern Art, New York, 2012
- Dormitorium: An Exhibition of Film Décors. Philadelphia, PA: The University of the Arts, 2009
