= In Absentia (film) =

2000 short film by Stephen Quay and Timothy Quay

- Official release poster
- Directed by: Stephen Quay; Timothy Quay
- Written by: Stephen Quay; Timothy Quay
- Produced by: Keith Griffiths
- Starring: Marlene Kaminsky
- Cinematography: Stephen Quay; Timothy Quay
- Edited by: Stephen Quay; Timothy Quay
- Music by: Karlheinz Stockhausen
- Distributed by: Zeitgeist Films
- Release date: 2000
- Running time: 20 minutes
- Country: United Kingdom
- Language: English
- Budget: $51,858

In Absentia (also known as In Absentia Sound on Film) is a 2000 British short film directed by the Brothers Quay and starring Marlene Kaminsky. It was commissioned by the BBC as a part of a series called "Sound on Film International", and was a collaboration with the filmmakers and composer Karlheinz Stockhausen. Keith Griffiths produced the film with production companies Illuminations Films and Koninck.

== Cast ==
Marlene Kaminsky as the woman.

== Plot ==
A seated woman, alone in a chair at a table in a room on one of the top floors of an asylum, repeatedly writes on a piece of paper and sharpens pencils. The pencil point often breaks under her fingers' force. She places the broken points outside the window on the sill. A satanic figure is somewhere nearby, animated and made of straw or clay, not flesh. A spotlight lights up her window randomly. She finishes her writing, tears the paper from the pad, folds it, places it in an envelope, and slips it through a slot that contains many more letters. Great emphasis is placed on extreme close-ups of the objects central to her existence: the pencils, the sharpener, the paper, her cramped, clenching hands, blackened fingernails, endless stubs of broken-off lead, and finally the letters themselves, packaged up and 'posted' uselessly into a grandfather clock.

== Influence ==
Karlheinz Stockhausen's composition, "Zwei Paare" (Two Couples), an electronic piece originally composed for the opera Freitag aus Licht in 1991, plays throughout the film and inspired the imagery and style in it. BBC producer Rodney Wilson set up the collaboration in 1999. The story found its inspiration in an exhibition in the Hayward Gallery called "Art and Psychosis" or "Beyond Reason" (1996–97), which consisted of works from the Prinzhorn Collection, a collection of artworks and artifacts created by the inhabitants of mental institutions. The Brothers Quay said, "In particular there was one set of drawings by a woman called "E.H.", which was Emma Hauck, born in 1878, died in 1928. Marital status: married, diagnosis: dementia praecox. The image was so powerful of letters written to her husband that were deeply disturbed writing, where she would write over the top of the original letter again and again until it became a graphite blur of imagery. So we said 'this is what the film would be about'." The film is dedicated to "E.H. who lived and wrote to her husband from an asylum." The Brothers Quay later learned that composer Karlheinz Stockhausen found their film compelling on a more intimate level. They later said, "The surprising thing is that when Stockhausen saw the film at an avant-premiere he was moved to tears. We only later learned that his mother was imprisoned by the Nazis in an asylum, where she later died. Even for us this was a very moving moment, especially because we directed the film without knowing any of this."

== Release ==
The black and white film, with some parts in colour, was originally created in 35mm format and is twenty minutes long. It was released by Zeitgeist Films in 2000.

In Absentia also played at the Film Forum theatre in New York City on 19 August 2015. The short film was released on Blu-ray on 20 October 2015.

The short film was released, alongside other shorts by the Quay Brothers, on May 14, 2020, on The Criterion Channel.

== Reception ==
=== Box office ===
As of 7 July 2025, In Absentia grossed $51,858 in the United States.
