= Trevor Duncan =

English composer (1924–2005)

Trevor Duncan (27 February 1924 – 17 December 2005) was an English composer, particularly noted for his light music compositions. Born in London, and largely self-taught, he originally composed as a sideline while working for the BBC. In the UK, he is well known for pieces such as The Girl From Corsica, High Heels and the March from A Little Suite, all of which gained fame as television and radio themes.

== Life ==
Trevor Duncan was born Leonard Charles Trebilcock (he later shortened this to Trebilco) in Camberwell, London, England. By twelve he could play the piano by ear, but wanted to learn to read and compose music properly. Thus, for one year he attended the Trinity College of Music for an external course on violin, harmony and counterpoint. However, his early knowledge of music was largely self-taught.

At eighteen, Duncan joined the British Broadcasting Corporation assisting in the production of radio plays. In 1943 he was conscripted into the Royal Air Force where he became a wireless operator. After his discharge from the RAF in 1947 he was given the opportunity to go to Cambridge University, but decided to return to BBC Radio as a sound and balance engineer working with many light orchestras. It was by studying scores and their orchestral effects that Duncan gained knowledge about composition and it was through an encounter with the conductor Ray Martin that Duncan had his first piece Vision in Velvet performed. However, the BBC restricted its own employees from having music performed on air. Thus, he concentrated on writing music to be recorded for newsreels and other companies not connected with the BBC. It was also at this point he chose his pseudonym, Trevor Duncan, a reference to a school nickname.

Ray Martin's approval of his next piece, the famous High Heels, encouraged Duncan to approach Boosey & Hawkes, who approved it for recording. The piece enjoyed immediate success, with numerous radio performances and a commercial recordings. In the next few years Duncan composed numerous works and he became one of the most prolific writers of so-called 'mood' music. During this period Duncan married his first wife Becky. The piece Little Debbie (1959) was inspired by their daughter Deborah.

With his success, he was unable to keep his BBC identity separate from his growing fame as a composer. In 1954 Duncan was promoted to be a music producer, and this conflict of interests meant that the BBC could not schedule any of his works in its programmes. Duncan made the decision to concentrate on composing full-time and left the BBC in 1956.

In 1959, he composed his two most famous works The Girl From Corsica and the Little Suite. The first of these was used as the theme music for the BBC Television serial of Francis Durbridge's The Scarf; the opening March from the second was used as the signature tune for Dr. Finlay's Casebook. However, after light music began to be heard less in the UK, he turned his attention to more serious orchestral works.

Until his death in 2005, Trevor Duncan continued composing, living with his second wife Susan and their daughter Zoe in Somerset. He died in Taunton, Somerset, aged 81.

== Works ==
Duncan's most famous works are mainly classed in the light music category. As well as those mentioned above, these include Children in the Park, 20th Century Express, Sixpenny Ride, Wine Festival and Meadow Mist, but in 1958 he composed the title music to the BBC's serial of Quatermass and the Pit, known as Mutations.

He was also a composer of more serious major orchestral works. His largest work, the Sinfonia Tellurica, composed in 1970, was a symphony based on the elements and man's achievements. Other larger compositions include The Navigators, St Boniface Down, A Tale of Two Hearts, The Visionaries and The Challenge of Space.

His library music appears in many productions of the 1950s and 1960s, such as The Quatermass Experiment (1953), Quatermass II (1955), The Key Man (1957), Quatermass and the Pit (1958), Strange Awakening (1958), Pathfinders In Space (1961), and Chris Marker's La jetée (1962). Between 1965 and 1968, his music was heard in several classic episodes of the BBC science fiction serial Doctor Who (including episodes of "The Space Museum", "The Time Meddler", "Mission To The Unknown", "The Moonbase", "The Tomb Of The Cybermen" and "The Web Of Fear"). Most infamously, his library piece "Grip of the Law" was chosen by Gordon Zahler as the opening titles of Ed Wood's Plan 9 from Outer Space.

His library music also featured in many Marvel Superhero cartoons for television of the 1960s, and in the modern era much of that has been recycled by the cartoon SpongeBob SquarePants. In his later years, he was credited with film-score music for the film The Piano Tuner of Earthquakes (2005) and was also writing a musical shortly before his death.

Duncan's "English Suite" became notorious after its use as the theme song for SNL's character, Master Thespian played by comedian Jon Lovitz. The character Master Thespian was a ruthlessly ambitious, egomaniacal actor who spoke with a plummy "Shakespearean" English accent and often elicited the sympathy of other characters in the sketch, only to reveal the ruse by declaring his famous catchphrase, "ACTING!" His arch-rival and mentor, Baudelaire (John Lithgow), often had the last laugh in the escalating one-upmanship. The sketch debuted on the SNL show of December 7, 1985 and appeared 13 times between 1985 and 1989.

=== Selected list of works ===
- High Heels (1949)
- 20th Century Express (1951)
- Children in the Park (1954)
- Meadow Mist (A Pastoral Soliloquy) (1954)
- The Navigators, suite (1954)
- The Visionaries, orchestral suite (1957)
- St. Boniface Down (An Idyll) (1957)
- The Girl from Corsica (1958)
- La Torrida (1958)
- Wine Festival (1958)
- A Little Suite (1959)
- Little Debbie (1959)
- Valse mignonette (1959)
- Overland to Oregon, suite (1960)
- Enchanted April (1964)
- Sixpenny Ride (1964)
- Maestro Variations (1967)
- Sinfonia Tellurica (1970)

== Filmography ==
- Little Red Monkey (1955)
- Joe MacBeth (1955)
- The Intimate Stranger (1956)
- The Hypnotist (1957)
- The Long Haul (1957)
- Man in the Shadow (1957)
- La Jetée (1962)
- Death Drums Along the River (1963)

== Sources ==
- David Ades' 1994 interview and biography.
