= Quay (film) =

2015 documentary short film

- DVD cover
- Directed by: Christopher Nolan
- Produced by: Christopher Nolan; Andy Thompson
- Cinematography: Christopher Nolan
- Edited by: Christopher Nolan
- Music by: Christopher Nolan
- Production company: Syncopy
- Distributed by: Zeitgeist Films
- Release date: 19 August 2015
- Running time: 8 minutes
- Country: United Kingdom
- Language: English
- Box office: $51,858

Quay is a 2015 British short documentary film composed, shot, edited, produced, and directed by Christopher Nolan about animators Stephen and Timothy Quay. The film premiered at the Film Forum theatre in New York City on 19 August 2015.

== Cast ==
- Stephen Quay as himself
- Timothy Quay as himself

== Production ==
Nolan had been an admirer of the Quay Brothers' work since coming across their films when they were originally screened on Channel 4 in the UK in the early 1990s. In addition to making a documentary about the inner workings of the brothers' studio, Nolan curated a theatrical tour called The Quay Brothers in 35mm, showcasing newly restored 35mm prints of the Quay's films In Absentia (2000), The Comb (1990) and Street of Crocodiles (1986).

== Release ==
Quay had its world premiere at the Film Forum theatre in New York City on 19 August 2015. The short film was released on Blu-ray on 20 October 2015.

=== Box office ===
As of 7 July 2025, Quay grossed $51,858 in the United States.

=== Critical reception ===
On the review aggregator website Rotten Tomatoes, 83% of 6 critics' reviews are positive.

The programme and Nolan's short received critical acclaim, with Indiewire writing in their review that the Brothers "will undoubtedly have hundreds, if not thousands more fans because of Nolan, and for that The Quay Brothers in 35mm will always be one of latter's most important contributions to cinema". Stephanie Zacharek of The Village Voice wrote, "Nolan gives us a glimpse into their world: His delightful and mischievous little film swoops in on the brothers as they work in their studio, which looks like a long-abandoned — and haunted — toymaker’s studio, a repository of trays and drawers full of rusty metal parts, pots of paints and potions, and tufts of antique doll hair."
