= Institute Benjamenta =

1995 drama film

Institute Benjamenta, or This Dream People Call Human Life
- Official release poster
- Directed by: Stephen Quay; Timothy Quay
- Written by: Alan Passes; Stephen Quay; Timothy Quay
- Based on: Jakob von Gunten; 1909 novel by Robert Walser
- Produced by: Karl Baumgartner; Janine Marmot; Keith Griffiths; Katsue Tomiyama
- Starring: Mark Rylance; Alice Krige; Gottfried John
- Cinematography: Nick Knowland
- Edited by: Larry Sider
- Music by: Lech Jankowski
- Production companies: Pandora Filmproduktion; Koninck Studios; Image Forum; Film Four International; British Screen Productions
- Distributed by: Zeitgeist Films
- Release dates: August 1995 (Locarno); 13 September 1995 (Toronto); 17 November 1995 (United Kingdom)
- Running time: 104 minutes
- Countries: Germany; Japan; United Kingdom
- Languages: German; English; Spanish; Afrikaans

Institute Benjamenta, or This Dream People Call Human Life is a 1995 drama film by the Brothers Quay in their feature debut. Based on Robert Walser's novel Jakob von Gunten, the film stars Mark Rylance, Alice Krige and Gottfried John.

== Plot ==
Jakob, a young man, enters a servant school run by siblings Johannes and Lisa Benjamenta. The teachers teach the students that they are unimportant. Jakob finds the school oppressive, and does not enjoy the lessons in subservience. He challenges the Benjamentas and attempts to shift their perspectives. Lisa is attracted to Jakob, spending time with him and showing him the secret labyrinth below the school. Lisa soon dies and the institute closes. Herr Benjamenta also shows a strange attraction to Jakob, and the film ends with them travelling together.

== Cast ==
- Mark Rylance as Jakob von Gunten
- Alice Krige as Lisa Benjamenta
- Gottfried John as Johannes Benjamenta
- Daniel Smith as Kraus
- Joseph Alessi as Pepino
- César Sarachu as Inigo
- Jonathan Stone as Hebling
- Peter Lovstrom as Jorgenson
- Uri Roodner as Schilinksi
- Peter Whitfield as Null

== Relation to the novel ==
Though the film follows the same basic structure as the novel, its plot is more limited. The film does not depict the ending of the novel, in which Jakob travels to a nearby city and meets his brother. The film remains almost exclusively focused on the institute once Jakob arrives there.

The Quays have characterized the film as a parallel universe of the novel. The film sometimes makes figurative aspects of the novel into literal objects in the film. One reccurring theme in the film is that many objects are seen vibrating, such as forks or bells. Parallels have been drawn between these vibrations and the frequent theme of music in Walser's writing. Also, in one passage of the book Jakob describes a staff member at the school as like a monkey, but in the film a literal monkey takes the role. In addition, while Jakob wonders about the activities of Herr and Lisa Benjamenta in the novel, the film clearly displays an incestuous relationship. The conclusion of the film, however, differs from the book. It shows Herr and Jakob's departure from the institute in a surreal scene of the two in a fish bowl rather than Jakob's literal journey back to town in the book.

== Themes ==
The film has been described as thematically similar to a fairy tale, a fantasy, or a dream world. Writing in the journal Adaptation, David Sorfa argues that many of the projects of the Brothers Quay discuss the idea that a "metaphysical interior" may exist. Sorfa argues that this film does not attempt to reveal a hidden meaning, but rather argue that a realm of hidden meaning, though unreachable, may exist nonetheless.

Ariel Swartley of The New York Times has drawn a comparison between Jakob's efforts to "turn himself into a machine" as a servant and the animation of objects that the Brothers Quay have focused on in their previous stop-motion films. (Institute Benjamenta was their first live-action film). Stephen Quay has said that they sought to convey a similar sense of "otherness" through the actors as they had done through puppets in previous projects. Laura Marks has argued that "non-sentient life seems to take precedence over human life" and that the film includes a "tide of non-human life".

Sorfa contends that the number zero is used as a sort of parody of a MacGuffin in the film.

== Reception ==
The film has been compared to Eraserhead due to its unconventional narrative and black-and-white filming style. Parallels have also been drawn between the film and Expressionist film of the 1920s. Silke Horstkotte has argued that the gestures of the actors and surreal aspects of the school also recall silent film conventions.

The imagery used in the film has been characterized as "befuddling", "puzzling", and "mysterious".

Peter Stack of the San Francisco Chronicle said that several scenes featuring miming were particularly well made. Phil Hall of Wired praised what he described as the "marvelous tension" between Rylance and Krige. He also applauded the focused and controlled performances by the rest of the cast. David Sorfa praised Rylance's portrayal of Jakob's emotions as "subtle".

Michael Atkinson praised the film's originality, stating that at times it is comparable to the "inevitable grip of the best David Lynch". He did note that he found the film confusing at times, and characterized it as possessing "Freudian secrecy". He suggests that the film should be seen as a mood, rather than as a narrative. He also lamented that the film saw a limited release (Note: The film was shown at approximately 50 theaters in the United States in the spring and summer of 1996.) and would likely only be seen by those who already have an interest in art film. Horstkotte noted that the film's "unusual aesthetic" would be viewed as very unusual to individuals who typically watch Hollywood films.

The Quays themselves later stated that they regretted the length of the film. They suggested that it would have been more effective as a short film or a very long film, rather than average length.

== Bibliography ==
- Buchan, Suzanne (2011). The Quay Brothers: Into a Metaphysical Playroom. University of Minnesota Press. ISBN 978-0-8166-4659-3.
- Horstkotte, Silke (2009). "Seeing or Speaking: Visual Narratology and Focalization, Literature to Film". In Sandra Heinen and Roy Sommer (ed.). Narratology in the age of cross-disciplinary narrative research. Walter de Gruyter. ISBN 978-3-11-022242-5.
- Marks, Laura (2005). "Institute Benjamenta: An Olfactory View". In Chris Gehman and Steve Reinke (ed.). The sharpest point: animation at the end of cinema. YYZ Books. ISBN 978-0-920397-32-9.
