= Christopher Slaski =

British composer

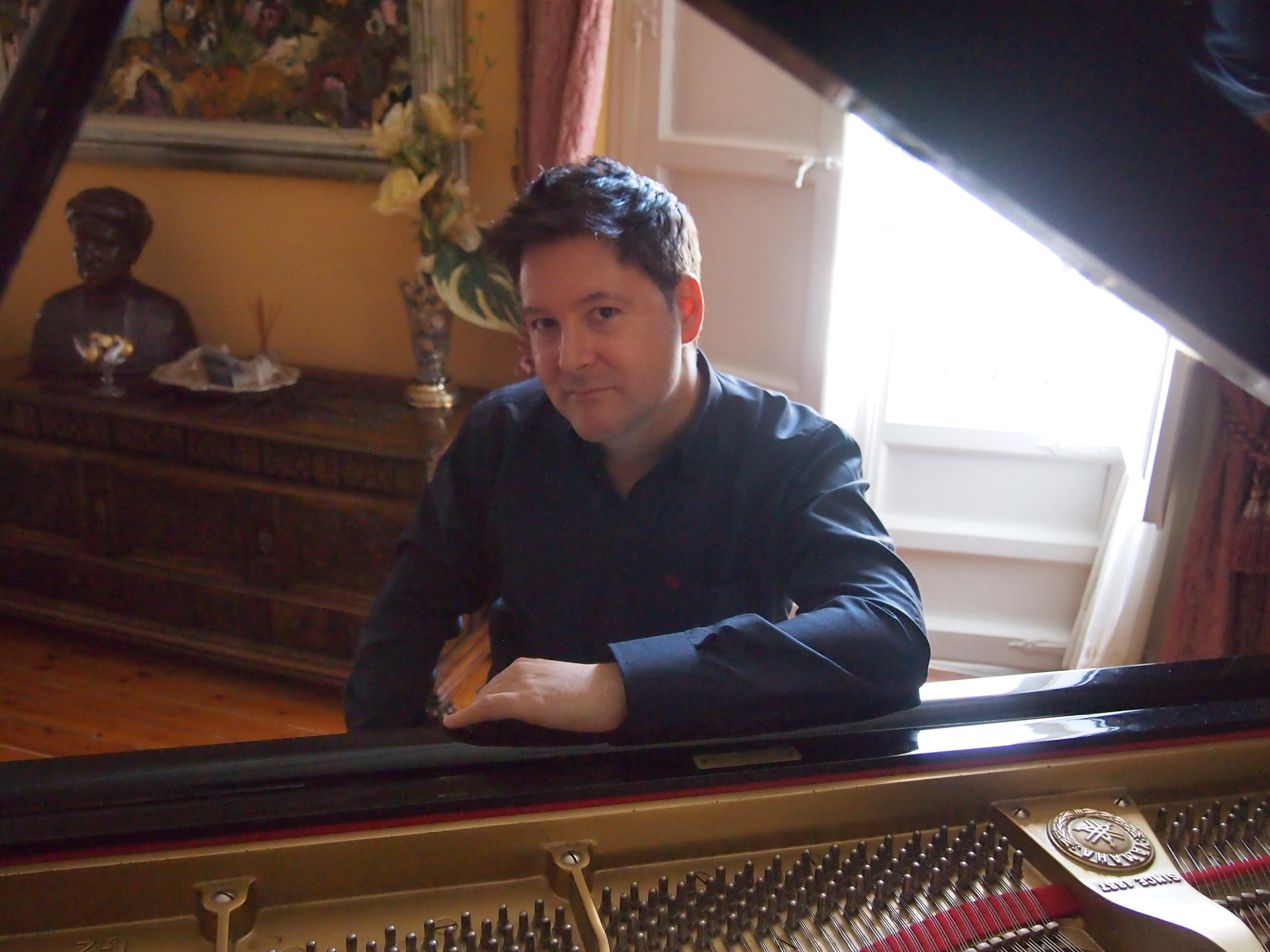
Christopher Slaski (2017)

Christopher Slaski (born 3 September 1974) is a composer who has created music for films, television, theatre and live performance. He is a past recipient of the award for Best Young European Film Composer presented by the World Soundtrack Academy in Ghent and in 2017 his score for A Good American was nominated for best music by the Austrian Film Academy. He is a member of the European Film Academy.

== Early life and education ==
Slaski holds a music degree from Cambridge University and a postgraduate in composition from London's The Royal Academy of Music. He also attended master classes by Ennio Morricone at the Accademia Musicale Chigiana, Siena, Italy and studied conducting with Lawrence Leonard.

== Career ==
Slaski has written scores for feature films, including Kevin Spacey's Beyond The Sea, The Pianotuner Of Earthquakes, the Spanish romantic-comedy Semen, una historia de amor, The Asylum, and the thriller Proyecto Dos. In 2009 he scored the Goya-nominated The Shame, by Spanish writer-director David Planell and in 2011 Rue Huvelin.

Slaski's score for the Spanish-French film Cuadrilatero, performed by the Brodsky Quartet, won awards at four international film festivals. In 2011 he won the prize for Best Original Score at the Rhodes Island International Film Festival for his work on Hollow, directed by Rob Sorrenti. In 2005 his score for the Spanish film Semen, A Love Story was nominated for Best Spanish Score by the Premios de la Crítica Musical Cinematográfica Española

He has also composed music for television, including documentaries, animated films and dramas for BBC, ITV and Channel 4. He has collaborated with BAFTA-winning director Beryl Richards on several occasions.

Slaski has written scores for theatrical productions, including Lope de Vega's El Perro Del Hortelano (The Dog In The Manger) directed by Laurence Boswell.

Slaski has written concert music, most notably the Frank Lloyd Wright Suite, recorded by the London Symphony Orchestra, as well as music for over 50 commercials and also arrangements and orchestrations for both pop and classical artists.

In 2016 the documentary film A Good American, directed by Fritz Moser, with music by Slaski, was screened at the CPH:DOX Festival in Denmark. His score was nominated for the Österreichische Filmpreis (Austrian Film Award) in 2017 and the soundtrack was released by Quartet Records.
