= Street of Crocodiles =

1986 stop-motion short film

- Directed by: Stephen Quay; Timothy Quay
- Written by: Stephen Quay; Timothy Quay
- Based on: The Street of Crocodiles by Bruno Schulz
- Produced by: Keith Griffiths
- Starring: Feliks Stawinski
- Cinematography: Stephen Quay; Timothy Quay
- Edited by: Stephen Quay; Timothy Quay
- Music by: Leszek Jankowski
- Release date: 1986
- Running time: 21 minutes
- Country: United Kingdom
- Box office: $51,858

Street of Crocodiles is a 21-minute-long British stop-motion animation short subject directed and produced by the Brothers Quay and released in 1986.

"The Street of Crocodiles" was originally a short story written by Bruno Schulz, from a story collection published under that title in English translation. Rather than literally representing the childhood memoirs of Schulz, the animators used the story's mood and psychological undertones as inspiration for their own creation.

== Plot ==
A man (caretaker) closes up a lecture hall; he spits into a box and snips the string holding a gaunt puppet.

Released, the puppet warily explores the darkened rooms about him. The desolate ambience and haunting musical score are meant to convey a sense of isolation and futility. As the short continues, the mute protagonist explores a realm of what are described by the directors as "mechanical realities and manufactured pleasures", including figures with pale-skinned, soulless baby doll heads composed of a conductor (the leader) and women who can move by having small wheels on their wardrobe legs.

As the protagonist chooses to join this world, the camera slowly reveals how unfulfilling the surroundings actually are.

== Cast ==
- Feliks Stawinski as Caretaker

== Themes ==
Although heavily metaphorical, the piece also exemplifies the experimental and curious nature of the Quays' work. Rather than examining the potential symbolism of such props as screws, dust, string, meat, and wind-up monkeys, many shots seem to focus on the movements and inherent characteristics of the materials. As they do in most of their films, the Brothers Quay employ a more musically grounded structure in place of a straightforward literal narrative in Street of Crocodiles.

== Reception and legacy ==
Terry Gilliam selected Street of Crocodiles as one of the top ten best animated films of all time. Critic Jonathan Romney went further still, voting it one of the ten best films of all time in the 2002 decennial critics' poll for Sight and Sound magazine.

The "unofficial" DVD version of the Nine Inch Nails video Closure contains a clip in which Mark Romanek, the director of the video for "Closer", explains that the video was heavily influenced by this animation.

In tribute to the Brothers Quay, Christopher Nolan made a documentary called Quay which also included this film.

The film is available through two separate DVD/VHS releases. The first was produced in 2000 by the New York-based Kino on Video and released on NTSC DVD. Entitled The Brothers Quay Collection: Ten Astonishing Short Films 1984–1993, it is now out of print The second edition was produced by the BFI in London and released in November 2006. The two-disc set, entitled Quay Brothers – The Short Films 1979–2003, has been licensed to Zeitgeist Films in New York, who brought out their own NTSC DVD Phantom Museums – The Short Films of the Quay Brothers in April 2007. The BFI and Zeitgeist versions feature an optional audio commentary by the Quay Brothers, which was recorded in London in May 2006.

Street of Crocodiles also played at the Film Forum theatre in New York City on 19 August 2015. The short film was released on Blu-ray on 20 October 2015.

The short film was released, alongside other shorts by the Quay Brothers, on May 14, 2020, on The Criterion Channel.

=== Box office ===
As of 7 July 2025, Street of Crocodiles grossed $51,858 in the United States.
