= Geoff Andrew =

British writer & lecturer on film

Geoff Andrew (born 1954) is a British writer, lecturer, teacher, film programmer and occasional broadcaster.

Born in Northampton, he studied at Northampton Grammar School and went on to gain a First in Classics at King's College, Cambridge. Andrew was for some years manager and programmer at London's Electric Cinema in Notting Hill, and later became the long-serving editor and chief critic of the film section of Time Out magazine. In 1999, he was appointed Programmer of London's National Film Theatre (later renamed BFI Southbank); in 2016 he became consultant Programmer-at-large to the venue, remaining part of the programming team until August 2024. In recent years he has also frequently taught as a visiting tutor at the London Film School.

Andrew is a regular contributor to Sight & Sound and has contributed essays and articles to many books and journals. He is the author of a number of books on the cinema, including BFI Classics volumes on Abbas Kiarostami (10) and Krzysztof Kieślowski’s Three Colours Trilogy; The Films of Nicholas Ray, Stranger Than Paradise: Maverick Film-makers in Recent American Cinema, The Film Handbook and Film Directors A-Z – The Art of the World’s Greatest Film-makers.

Andrew edited Film: The Critics' Choice, and five anthologies of Sight & Sound reviews and features devoted to Jean-Luc Godard, Martin Scorsese, Spike Lee and the 'New Hollywood' of the late 1960s and 70s; he was also consultant editor on all 19 editions of the annual Time Out Film Guide. He has contributed filmed introductions, commentaries and essays to numerous DVD and BluRay releases, and hosted on-stage interviews with a great many major directors, actors, producers and critics, not only for the BFI Southbank and London Film Festival but for film festivals in Rotterdam, Thessaloniki, Morelia, Marrakech and Sarajevo.

In 2003, Andrew served on the Un Certain Regard jury at the Cannes Film Festival; he has also served on juries in Venice, Cluj, Turin, Istanbul, Sarajevo, Morelia, Krakow, Brussels and London.

Among many other areas of film, Andrew has shown particular interest in French cinema. In 2009, the French government made him a Chevalier de l'Ordre des Arts et des Lettres for his contribution to French cinema.

In the 2012 Sight & Sound critics' poll, Andrew listed his ten favourite films as follows: L'Atalante, Citizen Kane, The General, His Girl Friday, La Morte Rouge (a 2006 short by Víctor Erice), My Night with Maud, Ordet, Persona, Ten, and Tokyo Story.

Andrew currently writes on film, music and the arts at his website at geoffandrew.com.
