= Christopher Nolan =

British and American filmmaker (born 1970)

Sir Christopher Nolan CBE
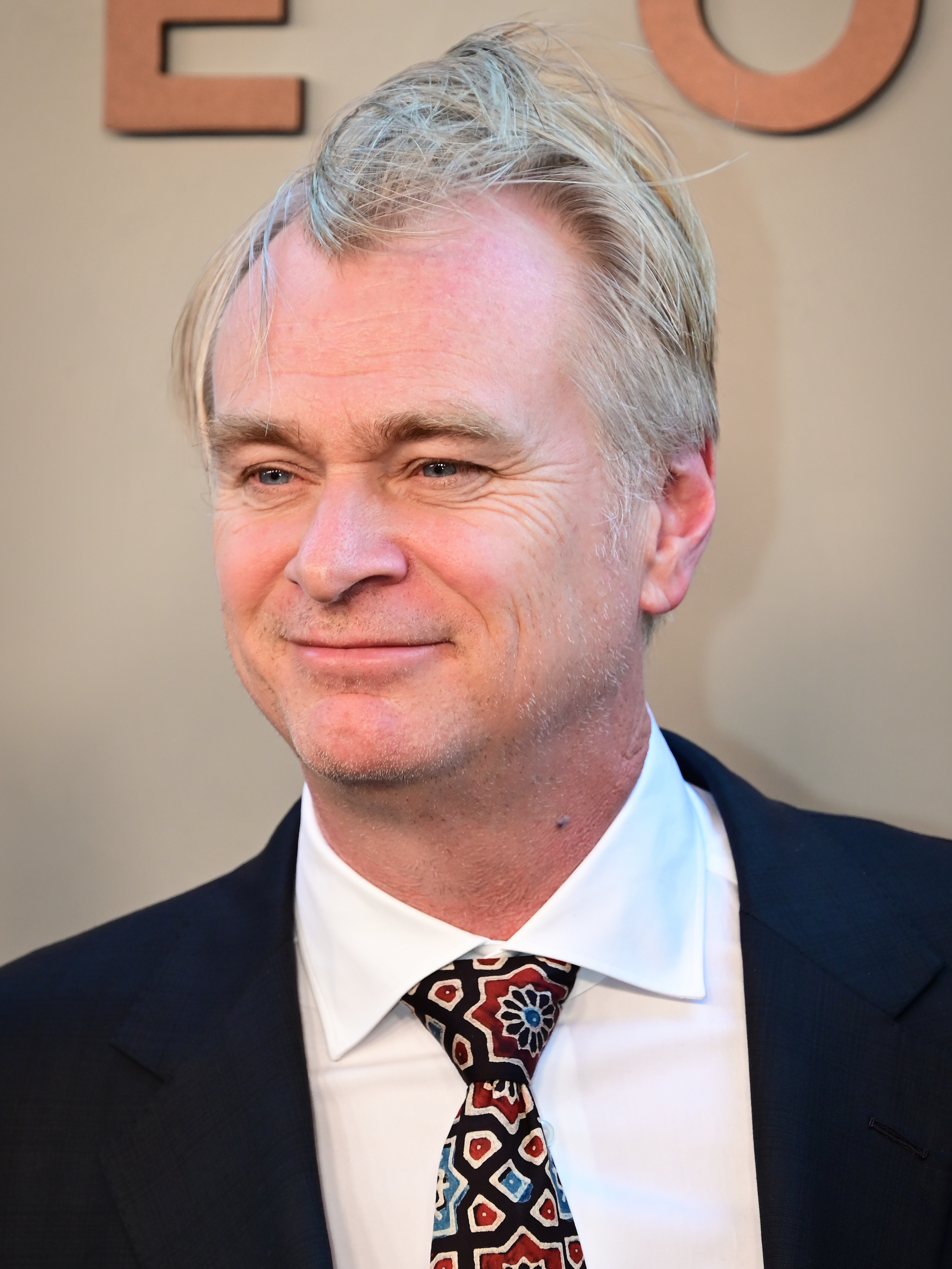
- Nolan in 2026
- Born: Christopher Edward Nolan; 30 July 1970 (age 56); Westminster, London, England
- Citizenship: UK; US
- Education: University College London (BA)
- Occupations: Film director; producer; screenwriter
- Years active: 1993–present
- Organisation: Syncopy Inc.
- Works: Full list
- Spouse: Emma Thomas (m. 1997)
- Children: 4
- Relatives: Jonathan Nolan (brother); Lisa Joy (sister-in-law); John Nolan (uncle)
- Awards: Full list

President of the Directors Guild of America
- Incumbent
- Assumed office 20 September 2025
- Preceded by: Lesli Linka Glatter

Sir Christopher Edward Nolan (born 30 July 1970) is a British and American filmmaker. Known for his Hollywood blockbusters with complex storytelling, Nolan is considered a leading filmmaker of the 21st century. His films have earned over $8 billion worldwide, making him the third-highest-grossing film director of all time. Nolan's accolades include two Academy Awards, a Golden Globe Award, and two British Academy Film Awards. He was also appointed a Commander of the British Empire (CBE) in 2019 and was knighted in 2024 for his contributions to film.

Nolan developed an interest in filmmaking from a young age. After studying English literature at University College London, he made several short films before his feature film debut with Following (1998). Nolan gained international recognition with his second film, Memento (2000), and transitioned into studio filmmaking with Insomnia (2002). He became a high-profile director with The Dark Knight trilogy (2005–2012) and found further success with The Prestige (2006), Inception (2010), Interstellar (2014) and Dunkirk (2017). After the release of the critically polarising Tenet (2020), Nolan parted ways with longtime distributor Warner Bros. Pictures over their streaming release strategy and signed with Universal Pictures for the highly successful Oppenheimer (2023) and The Odyssey (2026). The former won him Academy Awards for Best Director and Best Picture.

Three of Nolan's films have been inducted into the United States National Film Registry. (Note: These films are Memento (2000), The Dark Knight (2008), and Inception (2010).) Additionally, two of his films are among the highest-grossing of all time. (Note: These films are The Dark Knight Rises (2012) and The Odyssey (2026).) Infused with a metaphysical outlook, his works thematise epistemology, existentialism, ethics, the construction of time and the malleable nature of memory and personal identity. They feature mathematically inspired images and concepts, unconventional narrative structures, practical special effects, experimental soundscapes, large-format film photography and materialistic perspectives. His enthusiasm for the use and preservation of analogue and IMAX film cameras in cinema production, as opposed to digital, has also garnered significant attention. He has co-written several of his films with his brother, Jonathan, and runs the production company Syncopy Inc. with his wife, Emma Thomas. Nolan has been president of the Directors Guild of America since 2025.

== Early life and education ==
Just to be clear, I didn't go to film school because I couldn't get into film school. My father knew I wanted to be a filmmaker, but he advised me to get what he referred to as 'a real degree in a real subject,' so I'd have something to fall back on and then you can go to film school afterwards, which turned out not to be the case. So I studied English because that was the academic subject that I was best at and inclined most towards. But what I found when I studied at English at UCL, is it greatly informed my filmmaking process, my writing process. I started to become more at ease with a lot of the literary concepts that underlie film criticism in particular.

— Nolan on his education

Christopher Edward Nolan was born on 30 July 1970 in the Westminster district of London. His father, Brendan James Nolan (1936–2009), was a British advertising executive of Irish descent who worked as a creative director. His mother, Christina Jensen (born 1942), is an American former flight attendant from Evanston, Illinois; she also worked as a teacher of English. He has an older brother, Matthew, and a younger brother, Jonathan, also a filmmaker. The three brothers were raised Catholic in Highgate and spent their summers in Evanston. Nolan also spent time living in Chicago during his youth, and he holds dual British and American citizenship.

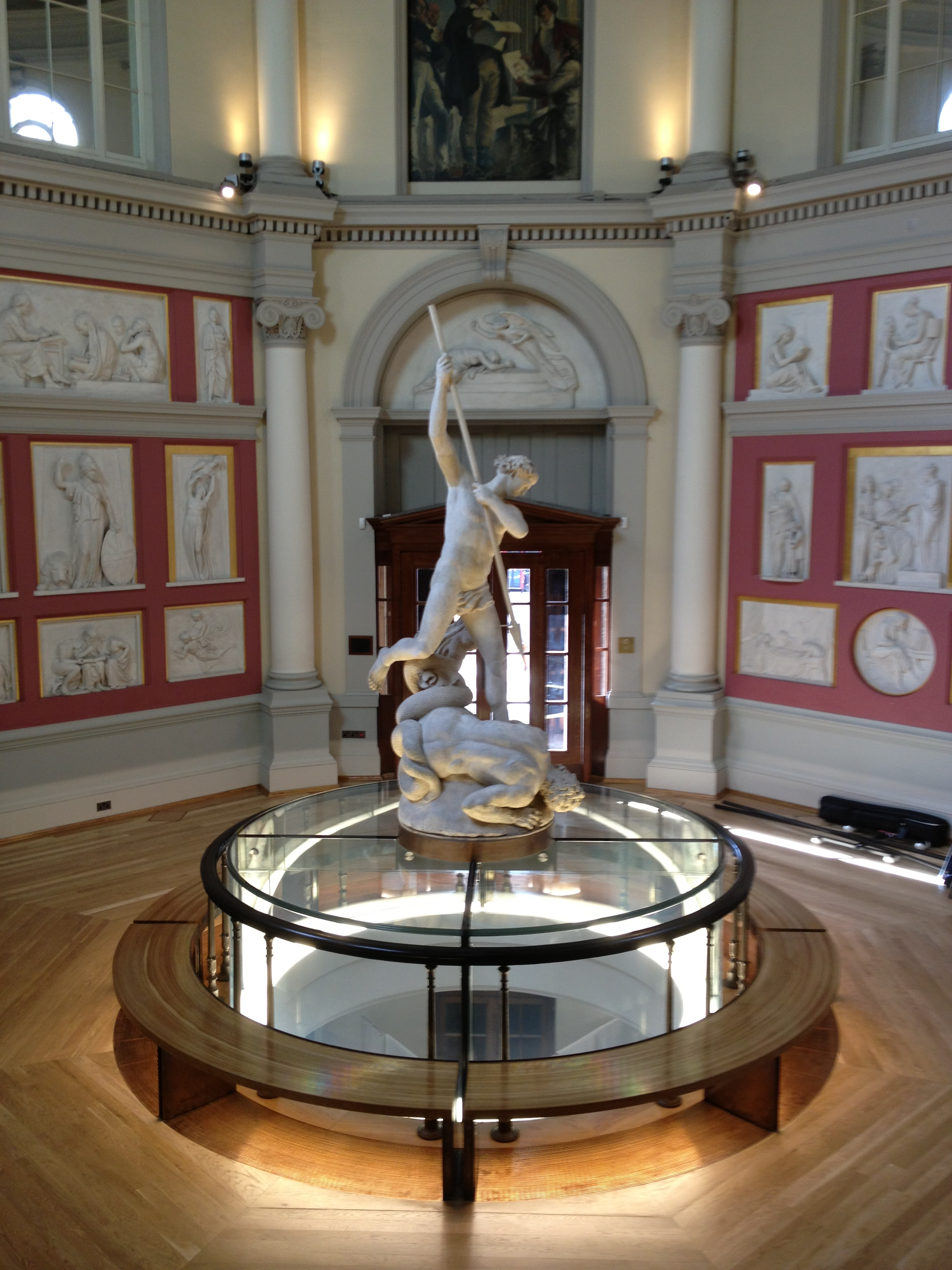
Nolan attended University College London and used its Flaxman Gallery (pictured) for a scene in Inception (2010).

Growing up, Nolan was particularly influenced by the work of Ridley Scott and the science fiction films 2001: A Space Odyssey (1968) and Star Wars (1977). He would repeatedly watch the latter film and extensively research its making. Nolan began making films at age seven, borrowing his father's Super 8 camera and shooting short films with his action figures. These films included a stop motion animation homage to Star Wars called Space Wars. He cast his brother Jonathan and built sets from "clay, flour, egg boxes and toilet rolls". His uncle, who had worked at NASA building guidance systems for the Apollo rockets, sent him some launch footage: "I re-filmed them off the screen and cut them in, thinking no-one would notice", Nolan later remarked. From age eleven, he aspired to be a professional filmmaker. Between 1981 and 1983, Nolan enrolled at Barrow Hills, a Catholic prep school in Witley, Surrey. In his teenage years, Nolan began making films with Adrien and Roko Belic. Nolan and Roko co-directed the surreal 8 mm Tarantella (1989), which was shown on Image Union, an independent film and video showcase on the Public Broadcasting Service. (Note: Nolan has continued his collaboration with the Belic brothers, receiving a credit for his editorial assistance on their Oscar-nominated documentary Genghis Blues (1999).) In 2021, after a fan posted a copy of Tarantella online, Nolan's production company filed a copyright infringement claim to have the film removed.

Nolan was privately educated at Haileybury and Imperial Service College in Hertford Heath, Hertfordshire, and later studied English literature at University College London (UCL). Having not been accepted to a film school, he pursued "a degree in something unrelated", which his father suggested "gives a different take on things". He chose UCL specifically for its filmmaking facilities, which comprised a Steenbeck editing suite and 16 mm film cameras. Nolan was president of UCL's Film Society, and with Emma Thomas (his girlfriend and future wife) he screened feature films in 35mm during the school year and used the money earned to produce 16 mm films over the summers.

He graduated in 1993 with a bachelor's degree in English literature. Thomas, who studied history at UCL and was also active in the Film Society, met Nolan on his first day at his hall of residence, Ramsay Hall. They later married and co-founded the production company Syncopy. Both have retained strong ties with UCL, receiving honorary fellowships (Nolan in 2006, Thomas in 2013). In 2017, Nolan was awarded an honorary doctorate.

== Career ==
=== 1993–2003: Early career and breakthrough ===
After earning his bachelor's degree in English literature in 1993, Nolan worked as a script reader, camera operator and director of corporate films and industrial films. He directed, wrote and edited the short film Larceny (1996), which was filmed over a weekend in black and white with limited equipment and a small cast and crew. Funded by Nolan and shot with the UCL Union Film society's equipment, it appeared at the Cambridge Film Festival in 1996 and is considered one of UCL's best shorts. For unknown reasons, the film has since been removed from public view. Nolan filmed a second short, Doodlebug (1997), about a man seemingly chasing an insect with his shoe, only to discover that it is a miniature of himself.

Nolan and Thomas first attempted to make a feature in the mid-1990s titled Larry Mahoney, which they scrapped. During this period in his career, Nolan had little to no success getting his projects off the ground, facing several rejections; he added, "[T]here's a very limited pool of finance in the UK. To be honest, it's a very clubby kind of place ... Never had any support whatsoever from the British film industry."

Shortly after abandoning Larry Mahoney, Nolan conceived the idea for his first feature, Following (1998), which he wrote, directed, photographed and edited. The film depicts an unemployed young writer (Jeremy Theobald) who trails strangers through London, hoping they will provide material for his first novel, but is drawn into a criminal underworld when he fails to keep his distance. It was inspired by Nolan's experience of living in London and having his apartment burgled; he observed that the common attribute between larceny and pursuing someone through a crowd was that they both cross social boundaries. Co-produced by Nolan with Thomas and Theobald, it was made on a budget of around £3,000. Most of the cast and crew were friends of Nolan, and shooting took place on weekends over the course of a year. To conserve film stock, each scene was rehearsed extensively to ensure that the first or second take could be used in the final edit. Following won several awards during its festival run and was well received by critics who labelled Nolan a majorly talented debutant. Scott Timberg of New Times LA wrote that it "echoed Hitchcock classics", but was "leaner and meaner". Janet Maslin of The New York Times was impressed with its "spare look" and "agile hand-held camerawork", saying, "As a result, the actors convincingly carry off the before, during and after modes that the film eventually, and artfully, weaves together."

"The difference between shooting Following with a group of friends wearing our own clothes and my mum making sandwiches to spending $4 million of somebody else's money on Memento and having a crew of a hundred people is, to this day, by far the biggest leap I've ever made."

— Nolan on the jump from his first film to his second (2012)

Following's success afforded Nolan the opportunity to make Memento (2000), which became his breakthrough film. His brother Jonathan pitched the idea to him, about a man with anterograde amnesia who uses notes and tattoos to hunt for his wife's murderer. Jonathan worked the idea into a short story, "Memento Mori" (2001), and Nolan developed it into a screenplay that told the story in reverse. Aaron Ryder, an executive for Newmarket Films, said it was "perhaps the most innovative script I had ever seen". The film was optioned and given a budget of $4.5 million, with Guy Pearce and Carrie-Anne Moss in the starring roles. Newmarket also distributed the film after it was rejected by studios who feared that it would not attract a wide audience. Following a positive word of mouth and screenings in 500 theatres, it earned $40 million. Memento premiered at the Venice Film Festival in September 2000 to critical acclaim. Joe Morgenstern of The Wall Street Journal wrote in his review, "I can't remember when a movie has seemed so clever, strangely affecting and slyly funny at the very same time." In the book The Philosophy of Neo-Noir, Basil Smith drew a comparison with John Locke's An Essay Concerning Human Understanding, which argues that conscious memories constitute our identities – a theme Nolan explores in the film. Memento earned Nolan many accolades, including nominations for an Academy Award and a Golden Globe Award for Best Screenplay, as well as two Independent Spirit Awards: Best Director and Best Screenplay. Six critics listed it as one of the best films of the 2000s. In 2001, Nolan and Emma Thomas founded the production company Syncopy Inc. (Note: The name of the company is derived from syncope, a medical term for fainting. Sorcha Ní Fhlainn, a lecturer specialising in film studies, alluded this wordplay to Nolan's style of "disorientation" in his work. She also associated the name with synthetic and philosopher Jean Baudrillard's treatise Simulacra and Simulation.)

Impressed by his work on Memento, filmmaker Steven Soderbergh recommended Nolan to Warner Bros. to direct the psychological thriller Insomnia (2002), although the studio initially wanted a more seasoned director. A remake of the 1997 Norwegian thriller of the same name, the film is viewed as "the outlier of Nolan's filmography" due to its perceived lack of unconventionality he is known for. Starring Al Pacino, Robin Williams and Hilary Swank, Insomnia follows two Los Angeles detectives sent to a northern Alaskan town to investigate the murder of a local teenager. It received positive reviews from critics and earned $113 million against a budget of $46 million. Film critic Roger Ebert praised the film for introducing new perspectives and ideas on the issues of morality and guilt, adding, "Unlike most remakes, the Nolan Insomnia is not a pale retread, but a re-examination of the material, like a new production of a good play." Richard Schickel of Time deemed Insomnia a "worthy successor" to Memento and "a triumph of atmosphere over a none-too-mysterious mystery".

Following, Memento and Insomnia established Nolan's image as an "auteur". After the lattermost, he wrote a screenplay for a Howard Hughes biopic. Nolan reluctantly tabled his script after learning that Martin Scorsese was already making one such film: The Aviator (2004). He was then briefly attached to direct a film adaptation of Ruth Rendell's novel The Keys to the Street for Fox Searchlight Pictures but chose to direct Batman Begins instead. In April 2003, filmmaker David O. Russell put Nolan in a headlock at a Hollywood party after learning that Jude Law, whom Russell wanted to cast, had decided to work with Nolan instead. Russell pressured Nolan to display "artistic solidarity" by relinquishing Law from his cast.

=== 2003–2013: Widespread recognition ===
In early 2003, Nolan was set to direct Troy (2004), based on Homer's Iliad. After leaving Troy, Nolan approached Warner Bros. with the idea of making a new Batman film, based on the character's origin story. Nolan was fascinated by the notion of grounding it in a more realistic world than a comic-book fantasy. Warner Bros. let Nolan make Batman Begins (2005) to reconcile with him after he was forced out of Troy when Wolfgang Petersen, the film's producer, decided to direct it. On Batman Begins, Nolan relied heavily on traditional stunts and miniature effects during filming, with minimal use of computer-generated imagery (CGI). Batman Begins was the biggest project Nolan had undertaken to that point, and it was released to critical acclaim and commercial success. Starring Christian Bale as Bruce Wayne / Batman—along with Michael Caine, Gary Oldman, Morgan Freeman and Liam Neeson—Batman Begins revived the Batman franchise. Batman Begins was 2005's ninth-highest-grossing film and was praised for its psychological depth and contemporary relevance; it is cited as one of the most influential films of the 2000s. Film author Ian Nathan wrote that within five years of his career, Nolan "[went] from unknown to indie darling to gaining creative control over one of the biggest properties in Hollywood, and (perhaps unwittingly) fomenting the genre that would redefine the entire industry".

Nolan directed, co-wrote and produced The Prestige (2006), an adaptation of the Christopher Priest novel about two rival 19th-century magicians. The screenplay was the result of an intermittent, five-year collaboration between him and his brother Jonathan, who had begun writing it in 2001. Nolan initially intended to make the film as early as 2003, but had postponed the project after agreeing to make Batman Begins. Starring Hugh Jackman and Christian Bale in the lead roles of rival magicians, The Prestige received critical acclaim and received two Academy Award nominations. Roger Ebert described it as "quite a movie – atmospheric, obsessive, almost satanic", and Kenneth Turan of the Los Angeles Times called it an "ambitious, unnerving melodrama". The Guardian's Philip French wrote: "In addition to the intellectual or philosophical excitement it engenders, The Prestige is gripping, suspenseful, mysterious, moving and often darkly funny." Despite a negative box-office prognosis, the film earned over $109 million against a budget of $40 million.

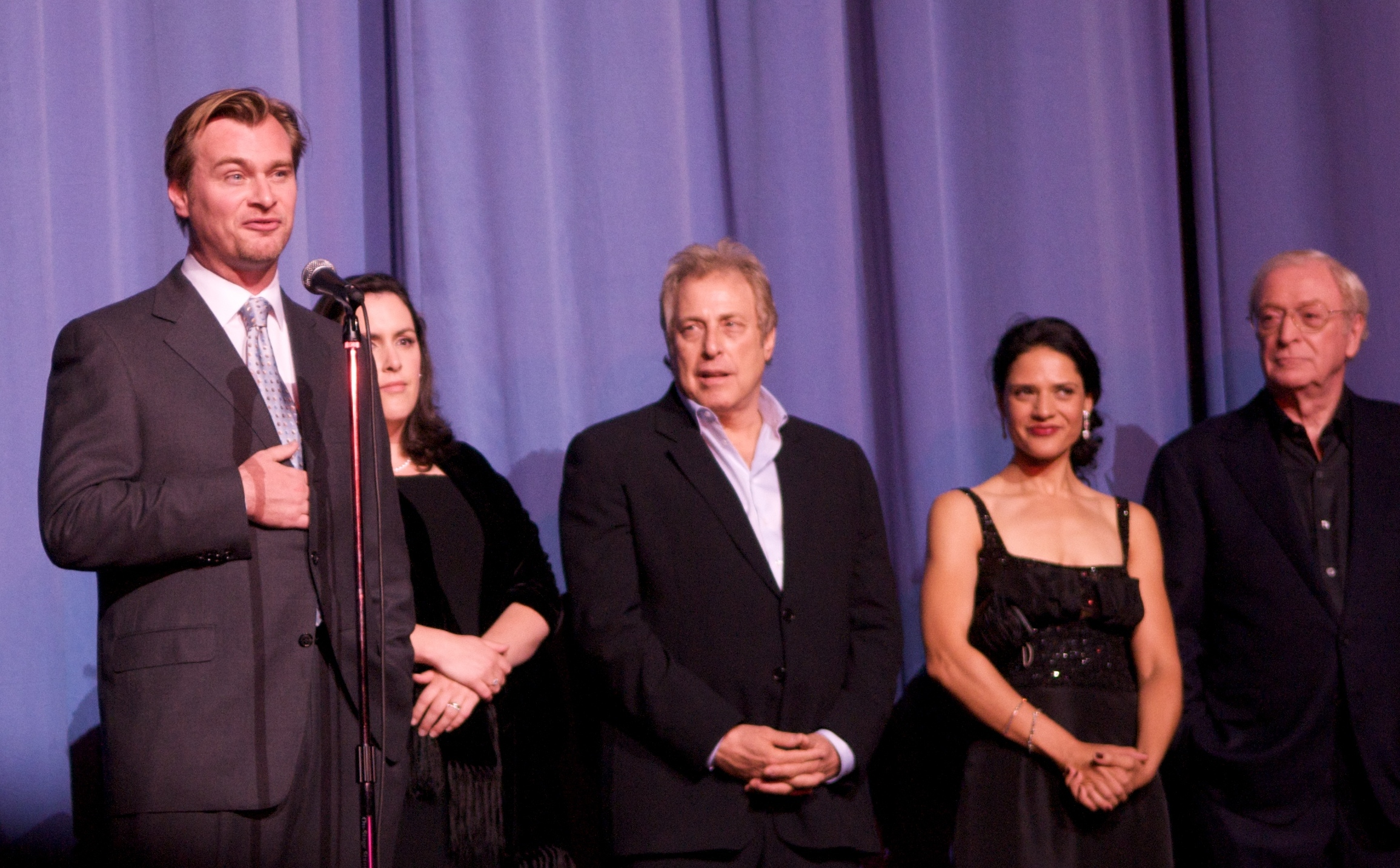
Nolan (left) with the cast and crew of The Dark Knight at the 2008 European premiere in London

The Dark Knight (2008), the follow-up to Batman Begins, was Nolan's next venture. Initially reluctant to make a sequel, he agreed after Warner Bros. repeatedly insisted. Nolan wanted to expand on the noir quality of the first film by broadening the canvas and taking on "the dynamic of a story of the city, a large crime story ... where you're looking at the police, the justice system, the vigilante, the poor people, the rich people, the criminals". Continuing to minimise the use of CGI, Nolan employed high-resolution IMAX cameras, making it the first major motion picture to use this technology. The Dark Knight has been ranked as one of the best films of the 2000s and one of the best superhero films ever made. (Note: Attributed to multiple references) Many critics declare The Dark Knight to be "the most successful comic book film ever made". Manohla Dargis of The New York Times found the film to be of higher artistic merit than many Hollywood blockbusters: "Pitched at the divide between art and industry, poetry and entertainment, it goes darker and deeper than any Hollywood movie of its comic-book kind." Ebert expressed a similar point of view, describing it as a "haunted film that leaps beyond its origins and becomes an engrossing tragedy". The Dark Knight set many box-office records during its theatrical run, earning over $1 billion worldwide. At the 81st Academy Awards, the film was nominated in eight categories, winning two: Best Sound Editing for Richard King and a posthumous Best Supporting Actor award for Heath Ledger for his portrayal of the Joker. The film's failure to garner a Best Picture nomination was criticised by the media. Beginning in 2010, the Academy increased their Best Picture nominees from five to ten, a change known as "The Dark Knight Rule". Nolan received many awards and nominations for his work on the film. In the late 2000s, Nolan was reported to direct a film adaptation of the 1960s television series The Prisoner.

The success of The Dark Knight allowed Warner Bros. to sign Nolan to write, direct and co-produce Inception (2010) – a film for which he had the idea around nine years before its release. Nolan described the film as "a contemporary sci-fi actioner set within the architecture of the mind". Starring a large ensemble cast led by Leonardo DiCaprio, the film became a critical and commercial success upon its release. Film critic Mark Kermode named it the best film of 2010, stating "Inception is proof that people are not stupid, that cinema is not trash, and that it is possible for blockbusters and art to be the same thing." Philosophy professor David Kyle Johnson wrote that "Inception became a classic almost as soon as it was projected on silver screens", praising its exploration of philosophical ideas, including leap of faith and allegory of the cave. The film grossed over $836 million worldwide. Nominated for eight Academy Awards—including Best Picture and Best Original Screenplay—it won Best Cinematography, Best Sound Mixing, Best Sound Editing and Best Visual Effects. Nolan was nominated for a BAFTA Award and a Golden Globe Award for Best Director, among other accolades.

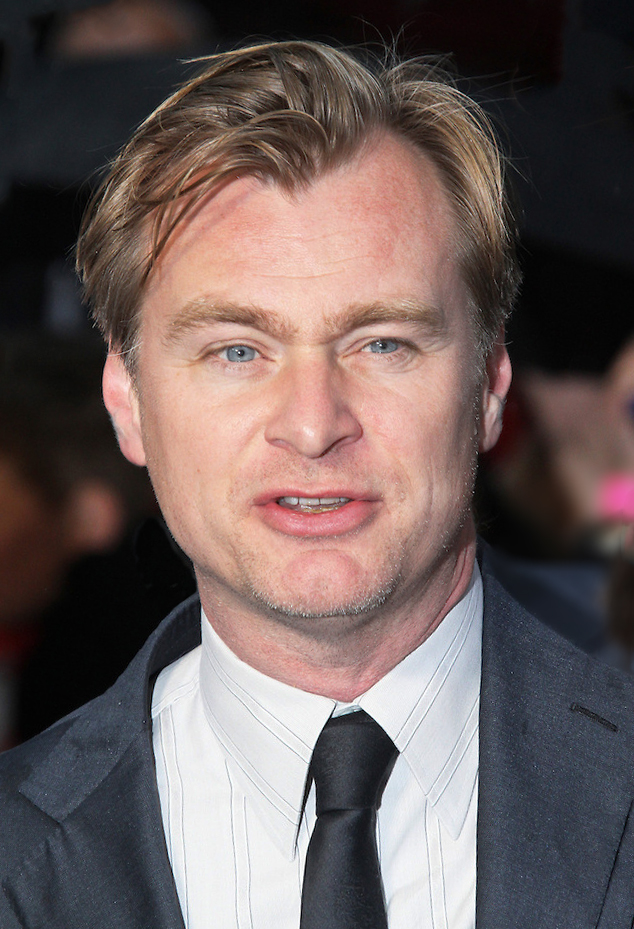
Nolan at the 2013 premiere of Man of Steel in London

Around the release of The Dark Knight Rises (2012), Nolan's third and final Batman film, Joseph Bevan of the British Film Institute wrote a profile on him: "In the space of just over a decade, Christopher Nolan has shot from promising British indie director to undisputed master of a new brand of intelligent escapism." After initial hesitation, Nolan agreed to return to direct The Dark Knight Rises and worked with his brother and David S. Goyer to develop a story that he felt would end the trilogy on a high note. The film was released to positive reviews. Kenneth Turan found the film "potent, persuasive and hypnotic" and "more than an exceptional superhero movie, it is masterful filmmaking by any standard". Christy Lemire of HuffPost wrote in her review that Nolan concluded his trilogy in a "typically spectacular, ambitious fashion", but disliked the "overloaded" story and excessive grimness. The Dark Knight Rises was a box office success, becoming the thirteenth film to gross $1 billion.

The Dark Knight trilogy inspired a trend in future superhero films seeking to replicate its gritty, realistic tone to little success. The second instalment in particular revitalised the genre at a time when recent superhero films had failed to meet expectations. Ben Child of The Guardian wrote that the three films "will remain thrilling totems of the genre for decades to come". During story discussions for The Dark Knight Rises, Goyer told Nolan of his idea about Man of Steel (2013), which the latter would produce. Impressed with Zack Snyder's work in 300 (2006) and Watchmen (2009), Nolan hired him to direct the film. Starring Henry Cavill as Clark Kent who learns that he is a powerful alien, Man of Steel received mixed reviews and grossed more than $660 million against a budget of $220 million.

=== 2014–2022: Established filmmaker ===
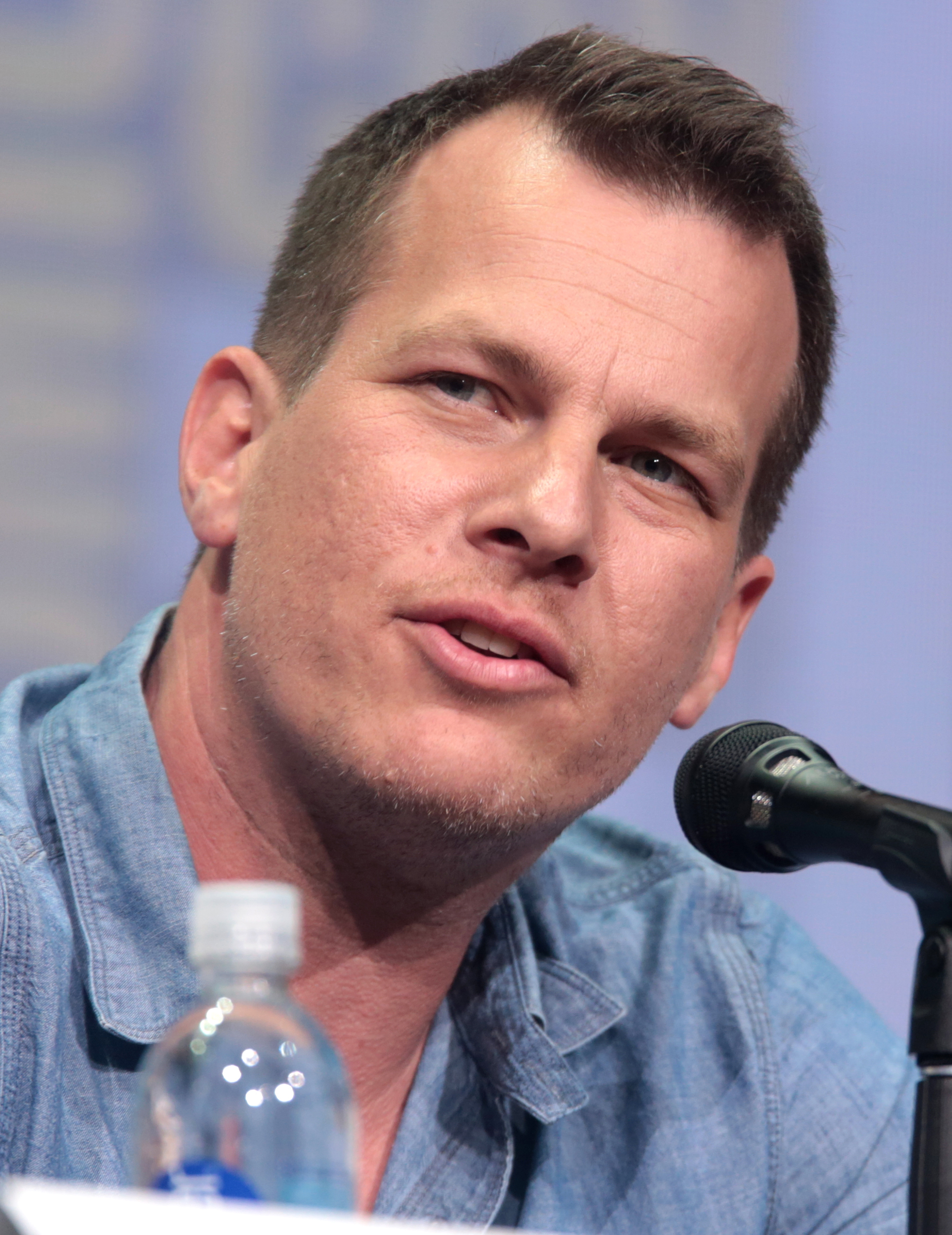
Nolan and his younger brother, Jonathan (pictured in 2017), wrote several screenplays together, including that of The Dark Knight and Interstellar.

Nolan next directed, wrote and produced the science-fiction film Interstellar (2014). The first drafts of the script were written by Jonathan Nolan, and it was originally to be directed by Steven Spielberg. Based on the scientific theories of theoretical physicist Kip Thorne, the film follows a group of astronauts who travel through a wormhole in search of a new home for humanity. In a 2014 discussion of the film's physics, Nolan expressed his admiration for scientific objectivity, wishing it were applied "in every aspect of our civilisation". Interstellar – starring Matthew McConaughey, Anne Hathaway and Jessica Chastain – was released to positive reviews and grossed $773 million worldwide. Observing its "visual dazzle, thematic ambition", The New York Times's A. O. Scott wrote that Interstellar is a "sweeping, futuristic adventure driven by grief, dread and regret". Documentary filmmaker Toni Myers called the film "a real work of art" and praised it for exploring a story spanning multiple generations. Interstellar was particularly praised for its scientific accuracy, which led to the publication of two academic papers. The American Journal of Physics called for it to be shown in school science lessons. At the 87th Academy Awards, the film won Best Visual Effects and received four other nominations. Also in 2014, Nolan and Emma Thomas served as executive producers on Transcendence, the directorial debut of his longtime cinematographer Wally Pfister.

In the mid-2010s, Nolan took part in several ventures for film preservation and distribution of the work of lesser-known filmmakers. His production company, Syncopy, formed a joint venture with Zeitgeist Films to release Blu-ray editions of Zeitgeist's films. As a part of the Blu-ray release of the animation films of the Brothers Quay, Nolan directed the documentary short Quay (2015). He initiated a theatrical tour, showcasing the Quays' In Absentia, The Comb and Street of Crocodiles. IndieWire wrote that the brothers "will undoubtedly have hundreds, if not thousands more fans because of Nolan, and for that The Quay Brothers in 35mm will always be one of [the] latter's most important contributions to cinema". An advocate for the survival of the analogue medium, Nolan and visual artist Tacita Dean invited representatives from leading American film archives, laboratories and presenting institutions to participate in an informal summit entitled Reframing the Future of Film at the Getty Museum in March 2015. Subsequent events were held at Tate Modern in London, Museo Tamayo in Mexico City and Tata Theatre in Mumbai. In April 2015, Nolan joined the board of directors of The Film Foundation, a non-profitable organisation dedicated to film preservation, and was appointed, along with Martin Scorsese, by the Library of Congress to serve on the National Film Preservation Board as DGA representatives. Nolan serves on the Motion Picture & Television Fund Board of Governors.

After serving as an executive producer on Zack Snyder's Batman v Superman: Dawn of Justice (2016) and Justice League (2017), Nolan returned to directing with Dunkirk (2017). Based on his own original screenplay and co-produced with Thomas, the film is set amid World War II in 1940 and the evacuation of Allied soldiers from the beaches of Dunkirk, France. Describing the film as a survival tale with a triptych structure, Nolan wanted to make a "sensory, almost experimental movie" with minimal dialogue. He said he waited to make Dunkirk until he had earned the trust of a major studio to let him make it as a British film but with an American budget. Before filming, Nolan sought advice from Spielberg, who later said in an interview with Variety, "knowing and respecting that Chris [Nolan] is one of the world's most imaginative filmmakers, my advice to him was to leave his imagination, as I did on Ryan, in second position to the research he was doing to authentically acquit this historical drama". Starring an ensemble cast, Dunkirk was released to widespread critical acclaim and strong box office results. It grossed over $526 million worldwide, making it the highest-grossing World War II film of all time. In his review, Mick LaSalle of the San Francisco Chronicle wrote: "It's one of the best war films ever made, distinct in its look, in its approach and in the effect it has on viewers. There are movies—they are rare—that lift you out of your present circumstances and immerse you so fully in another experience that you watch in a state of jaw-dropped awe. Dunkirk is that kind of movie." The film received many accolades, including Nolan's first Oscar nomination for Best Director.

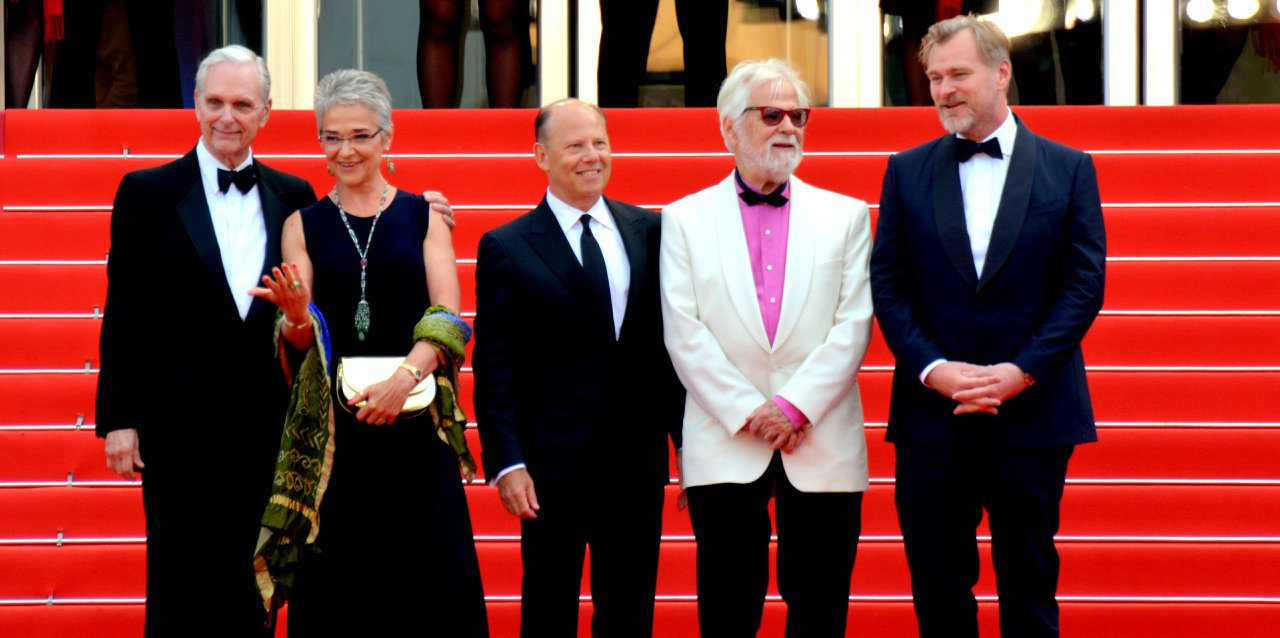
Nolan (right) with Keir Dullea, Katharina Kubrick, Ron Sanders and Jan Harlan at the 2018 Cannes Film Festival

In 2018, Nolan supervised a new 70 mm print of Stanley Kubrick's 2001: A Space Odyssey (1968), made from the original camera negative; he presented it at the 2018 Cannes Film Festival. USA Today observed that festival-goers greeted Nolan "like a rock star with a standing ovation". A year later, Nolan and Thomas received executive producer credits on The Doll's Breath (2019), an animated short directed by the Quay brothers.

Nolan's next film was the science fiction film Tenet (2020), described by Tom Shone of The Sunday Times as "a globe-spinning riff on all things Nolanesque". Nolan had worked on the screenplay for more than five years after deliberating about its central ideas for over a decade. Delayed three times due to the COVID-19 pandemic, Tenet was the first Hollywood tent-pole to open in theatres after the pandemic shutdown. The film tells the story of an unnamed protagonist (played by John David Washington) who travels through time to stop a world-threatening attack. It grossed $363 million worldwide on a production budget of $200 million, becoming Nolan's first to underperform at the box-office. Tenet was described as his most polarising film; critics praised the ambition and technical aspects but found its story confusing. Peter Bradshaw of The Guardian awarded it five out of five, calling it "a cerebral cadenza, a deadpan flourish of crazy implausibility—but supercharged with steroidal energy and imagination". Leslie Felperin of The Hollywood Reporter described it as "a chilly, cerebral film—easy to admire, especially since it's so rich in audacity and originality, but almost impossible to love, lacking as it is in a certain humanity". At the 93rd Academy Awards, the film won Best Visual Effects and was nominated for Best Production Design. Following the release of Tenet, Nolan joined the advisory board of the Society of Motion Picture and Television Engineers. He served as an executive producer on Zack Snyder's Justice League (2021), a director's cut of 2017's Justice League.

=== 2023–present: Oppenheimer and The Odyssey ===
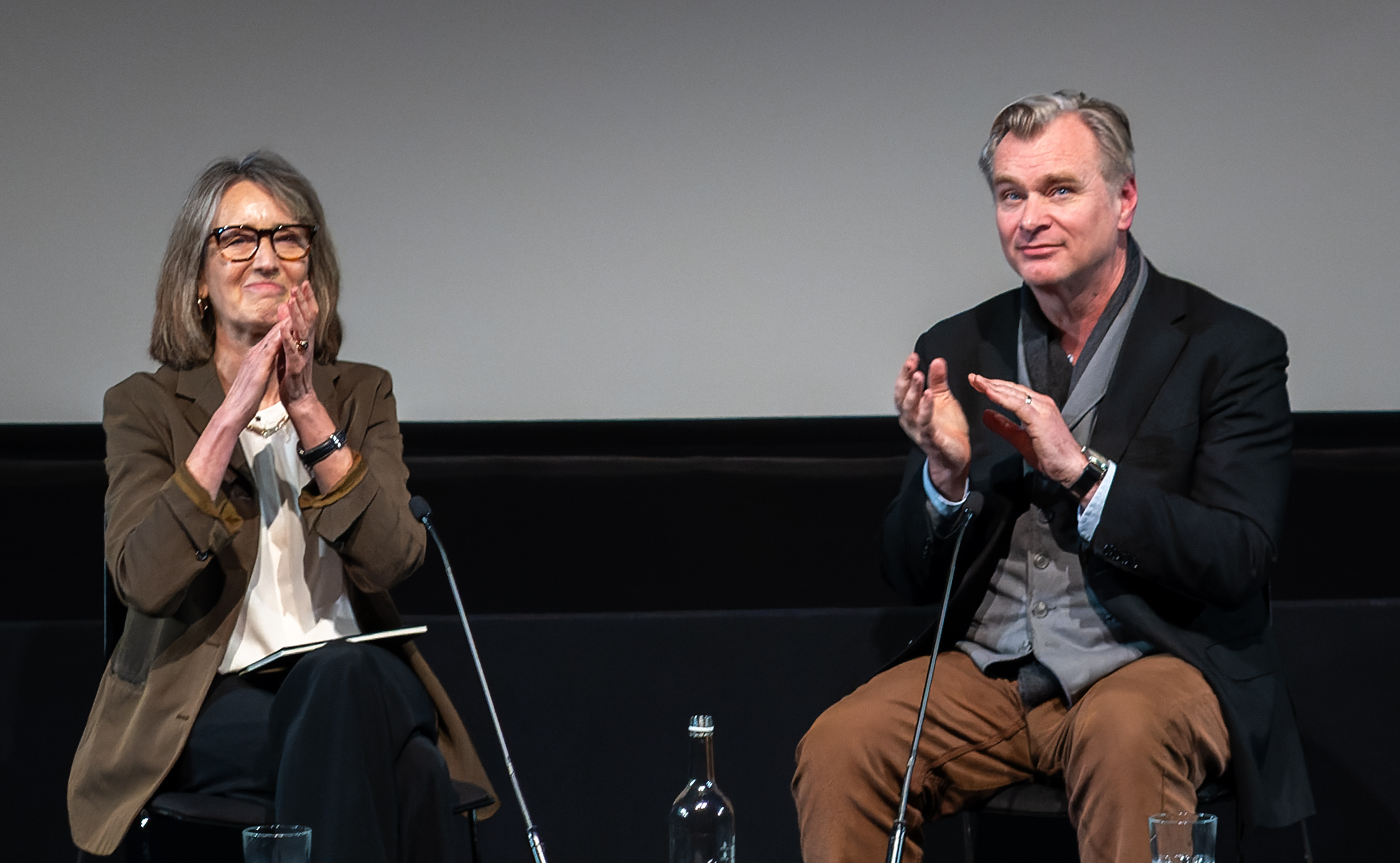
Nolan at BFI Southbank in 2024

Nolan's 12th film was Oppenheimer (2023), a biopic based on J. Robert Oppenheimer (played by Cillian Murphy) and his role in the development of the atom bomb. It was Nolan's first R-rated film since Insomnia (2002). The film was financed and distributed by Universal Pictures, making it Nolan's first feature film since Memento that was not made for Warner Bros. He disagreed with Warner Bros.' decision to simultaneously release their films in theatres and on HBO Max.

Nolan secured the deal with Universal after he was promised a production budget of around $100 million with an equal marketing budget, total creative control, 20% of first-dollar gross, a 100-day theatrical window and a blackout period from the studio wherein the company would not release another film three weeks before or after Oppenheimer's release. The film received critical acclaim. Matthew Jackson of The A.V. Club wrote, "Oppenheimer deserves the title of masterpiece. It's Christopher Nolan's best film so far, a step up to a new level for one of our finest filmmakers, and a movie that burns itself into your brain." Terming it "boldly imaginative and [Nolan's] most mature work yet", BBC Culture's Caryn James added that it combined the "explosive, commercially-enticing action of The Dark Knight trilogy" with the "cerebral underpinnings" of Memento, Inception and Tenet. Oppenheimer grossed over $975 million worldwide, making it the third-highest-grossing film of 2023. Among the film's numerous accolades, Nolan won the Academy Awards for Best Director and Best Picture. The success of Oppenheimer further highlighted Nolan's status as one of Hollywood's most "bankable" directors.

In 2025, Nolan was elected president of the Directors Guild of America, a labour organisation representing more than 19,500 members. His next directorial effort was The Odyssey, an adaptation of the ancient Greek epic poem the Odyssey by Homer. It follows Odysseus (portrayed by Matt Damon), the Greek king of Ithaca, on his perilous journey to return home following the Trojan War. Made on a budget of $250 million, The Odyssey is among the most expensive films of Nolan's career and the first to be shot entirely in IMAX's 70 mm film cameras. Nolan described it as the largest and most challenging production of his career due to its scale. He explained that he adapted the film because no major Hollywood studio had turned it into a large-scale production, calling it "an odd gap in movie history". Leading up to its release, The Odyssey was subject to online backlash and criticism regarding Nolan's casting choices of non-Greek actors, the use of American accents and modern English dialogue, and the production design. It was released in July 2026 to widespread critical acclaim. Peter Bradshaw of The Guardian gave The Odyssey five out of five, calling it "a film with thrilling ambition, boldness, seriousness, generosity and flair". Amy Nicholson of the Los Angeles Times viewed the film as a powerful vehicle for Nolan's core themes that reinterprets classic mythology to explore memory, identity, destructive genius, and time. It became the highest-grossing film in Nolan's career at $1.8 billion.

== Personal life and public image ==
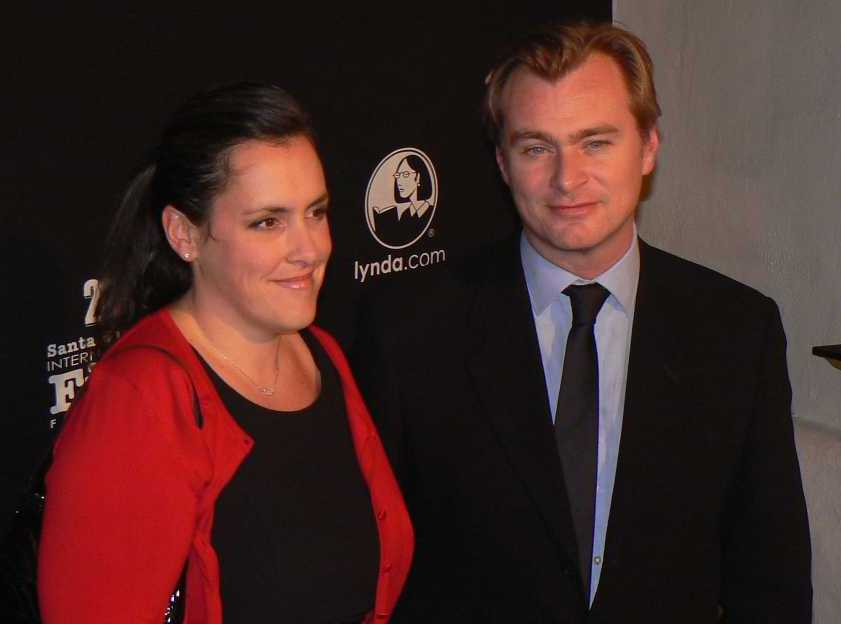
Nolan and his wife Emma Thomas in 2011. Thomas has worked as a producer on all of Nolan's films since 1997.

Nolan has been married to Emma Thomas since 1997. They met at University College London when Nolan was 19. Thomas has worked as a producer on all of Nolan's films since 1997, the same year they were married. The couple have four children and reside in Los Angeles. Nolan and Thomas were included in the Sunday Times Rich List of 2026 with an estimated net worth of £370 million.

Nolan prefers to maintain a certain level of mystery about his work. Refusing to discuss his personal life, he feels that too much biographical information about a filmmaker detracts from the experience of his audiences. He stated, "I actually don't want people to have me in mind at all when they're watching the films." He does not own a smartphone or have an email address, preferring to hand-deliver his scripts to actors instead and have his wife handle outreach with producers and distributors. Unlike most of his filmmaker peers, Nolan is known for wearing suit jackets on set, describing them as a "uniform" that simplifies his daily routine and allows him to focus on work.

== Filmmaking style ==
Nolan's films are largely centred in metaphysical themes, exploring the concepts of time, memory and personal identity. His work is characterised by mathematically inspired ideas and images, unconventional narrative structures, materialistic perspectives, and evocative use of music and sound. (Note: Attributed to multiple references) Filmmaker Guillermo del Toro called Nolan "an emotional mathematician". BBC's arts editor Will Gompertz described him as "an art house auteur making intellectually ambitious blockbuster movies that can leave your pulse racing and your head spinning". Joseph Bevan wrote, "His films allow arthouse regulars to enjoy superhero flicks and multiplex crowds to engage with labyrinthine plot conceits." Nolan views himself as "an indie filmmaker working inside the studio system".

"Christopher Nolan doesn't make sense. And that is exactly how he likes it. In twenty-three years and through twelve films, he has defied the laws of Hollywood by creating startling, original genre pieces that have revelled in their own complexity, confounding every maxim by which the studios hope to appeal to the widest audience. And yet he does that too. Cinemas fill on the possibility of the next Nolan film. Whatever form it might take."

— Film author Ian Nathan on Nolan as a filmmaker (2022)

In the sixteen-essay book The Philosophy of Christopher Nolan, professional philosophers and writers analysed Nolan's work; they identified themes of self-destruction, the nature and value of the truth, and the political mindset of the hero and villain, among others. Robbie B. H. Goh, a professor of English literature, described Nolan as a "philosophical filmmaker" who includes philosophical ideas—existentialism, morality, epistemology and the distinction between appearance and reality—in films that frequently portray suspense, action and violence. Goh appreciated his ability to incorporate such themes in films that possess "elements of the Hollywood blockbuster"—which help keep the audiences engaged—but simultaneously remain "more thoughtful and self-reflexive than the typical consumerist action film". He further wrote that Nolan's body of work reflect "a heterogeneity of conditions of products" extending from low-budget films to lucrative blockbusters, "a wide range of genres and settings" and "a diversity of styles that trumpet his versatility".

David Bordwell, a film theorist, wrote that Nolan has been able to blend his "experimental impulses" with the demands of mainstream entertainment, describing his oeuvre as "experiments with cinematic time by means of techniques of subjective viewpoint and crosscutting". Nolan's use of practical, in-camera effects, miniatures and models, as well as shooting on celluloid film, has been highly influential in early 21st century cinema. IndieWire wrote in 2019 that Nolan "kept a viable alternate model of big-budget filmmaking alive", in an era where blockbuster filmmaking has become "a largely computer-generated art form". Because of Nolan's deep involvement in the technical facet of his films, Stuart Joy described him as a "complete filmmaker", who "oversees all aspects of production while also managing cultural and industrial factors outside of the text".

== Recognition ==
Nolan has made some of the most influential and popular films of his time. (Note: Attributed to multiple references) Many of his films have been regarded by critics as among the best of their respective decades, and according to The Wall Street Journal, his "ability to combine box-office success with artistic ambition has given him an extraordinary amount of clout in the industry". His films have earned more than $8 billion. Nolan's films Memento, The Dark Knight and Inception have been selected by the US Library of Congress to be preserved in the National Film Registry for being "culturally, historically or aesthetically" significant. These films appeared in BBC's 100 Greatest Films of the 21st Century and The Hollywood Reporter's poll of best films ever made. In 2017, The Dark Knight, Inception and Interstellar featured in Empire magazine's poll of "The 100 Greatest Movies". In 2018, The Hollywood Reporter listed Nolan as one of the 100 most powerful people in entertainment and described him as a "franchise unto himself". Parade ranked Nolan number eight in its 2022 list of 75 Best Movie Directors of All Time. Five of his films was included in The New York Times 2025 list of The 100 Best Movies of the 21st Century. That same year, Memento, The Dark Knight and Oppenheimer featured in Rolling Stone's list of "The 100 Best Movies of the 21st Century." In 2026, Vulture ranked him first in their list of the 100 most powerful directors in Hollywood.

Three of Nolan's films (Memento, The Dark Knight and Inception) have been selected by the Library of Congress for preservation in the National Film Registry.

Nolan's work has been as "intensely embraced, analysed and debated by ordinary film fans as by critics and film academics". Calling him "a persuasively inventive storyteller", Geoff Andrew of the British Film Institute named Nolan one of the few contemporary filmmakers producing highly personal films within the Hollywood mainstream. Andrew wrote that Nolan's films are "not so much [notable] for their considerable technical virtuosity and visual flair as for their brilliant narrative ingenuity and their unusually adult interest in complex philosophical questions". David Bordwell observed that Nolan is "considered one of the most accomplished living filmmakers", citing his ability to turn genre movies into both art and event films, as well as his box-office numbers, critical acclaim and popularity among cinemagoers.

In 2008, Philip French deemed Nolan "the first major talent to emerge this century". Mark Kermode complimented Nolan for bringing "the discipline and ethics of art-house independent moviemaking and apply[ing] them to Hollywood blockbusters. He's living proof that you don't have to appeal to the lowest common denominator to be profitable". The Observer's Ryan Gilbey described Nolan as a "skillful, stylish storyteller, capable of combining the spectacle of Spielberg with the intellectual intricacy of Nicolas Roeg or Alain Resnais". Mark Cousins applauded Nolan for embracing big ideas, "Hollywood filmmakers generally shy away from ideas—but not Christopher Nolan". Scott Foundas of Variety declared Nolan "the premier big-canvas storyteller of his generation", and Justin Chang of the Los Angeles Times called him "the great proceduralist of 21st century blockbuster filmmaking, a lover of nuts-and-bolts minutiae".

Nolan has been praised by many of his contemporaries, and his work has influenced them. Kenneth Branagh called Nolan's approach to large-scale filmmaking "unique in modern cinema", adding, "regardless of how popular his movies become, he remains an artist and an auteur. I think for that reason he has become a heroic figure for both the audience and the people working behind the camera." Michael Mann complimented Nolan for his "singular vision" and credited with "invent[ing] the post-heroic superhero". Nicolas Roeg said of Nolan, "People talk about 'commercial art' and the term is usually self-negating; Nolan works in the commercial arena and yet there's something very poetic about his work." Martin Scorsese identified Nolan as a filmmaker creating "beautifully made films on a big scale". Damien Chazelle lauded Nolan for his ability "to make the most seemingly impersonal projects—superhero epics, deep-space mind-benders—feel deeply personal". Discussing the difference between art films and big studio blockbusters, Steven Spielberg referred to Nolan's Dark Knight series as an example of both; he has described Memento and Inception as "masterworks". Makoto Shinkai cited Nolan's Interstellar as a strong influence on his acclaimed anime feature film, Your Name. Denis Villeneuve was impressed by Nolan's ability "to keep his identity and create his own universe in that large scope ... To bring intellectual concepts and to bring them in that scope to the screen right now—it's very rare. Every movie that he comes out with, I have more admiration for his work."

== Filmography ==
As of 2026, Nolan has directed 13 full-length narrative films.

| Year | Title | Distributor |
|---|---|---|
| 1998 | Following | Momentum Pictures |
| 2000 | Memento | Newmarket Films |
| 2002 | Insomnia | Warner Bros. Pictures |
| 2005 | Batman Begins | Warner Bros. Pictures |
| 2006 | The Prestige | Buena Vista Pictures Distribution / Warner Bros. Pictures |
| 2008 | The Dark Knight | Warner Bros. Pictures |
| 2010 | Inception | Warner Bros. Pictures |
| 2012 | The Dark Knight Rises | Warner Bros. Pictures |
| 2014 | Interstellar | Paramount Pictures / Warner Bros. Pictures |
| 2017 | Dunkirk | Warner Bros. Pictures |
| 2020 | Tenet | Warner Bros. Pictures |
| 2023 | Oppenheimer | Universal Pictures |
| 2026 | The Odyssey | Universal Pictures |

== Awards and honours ==
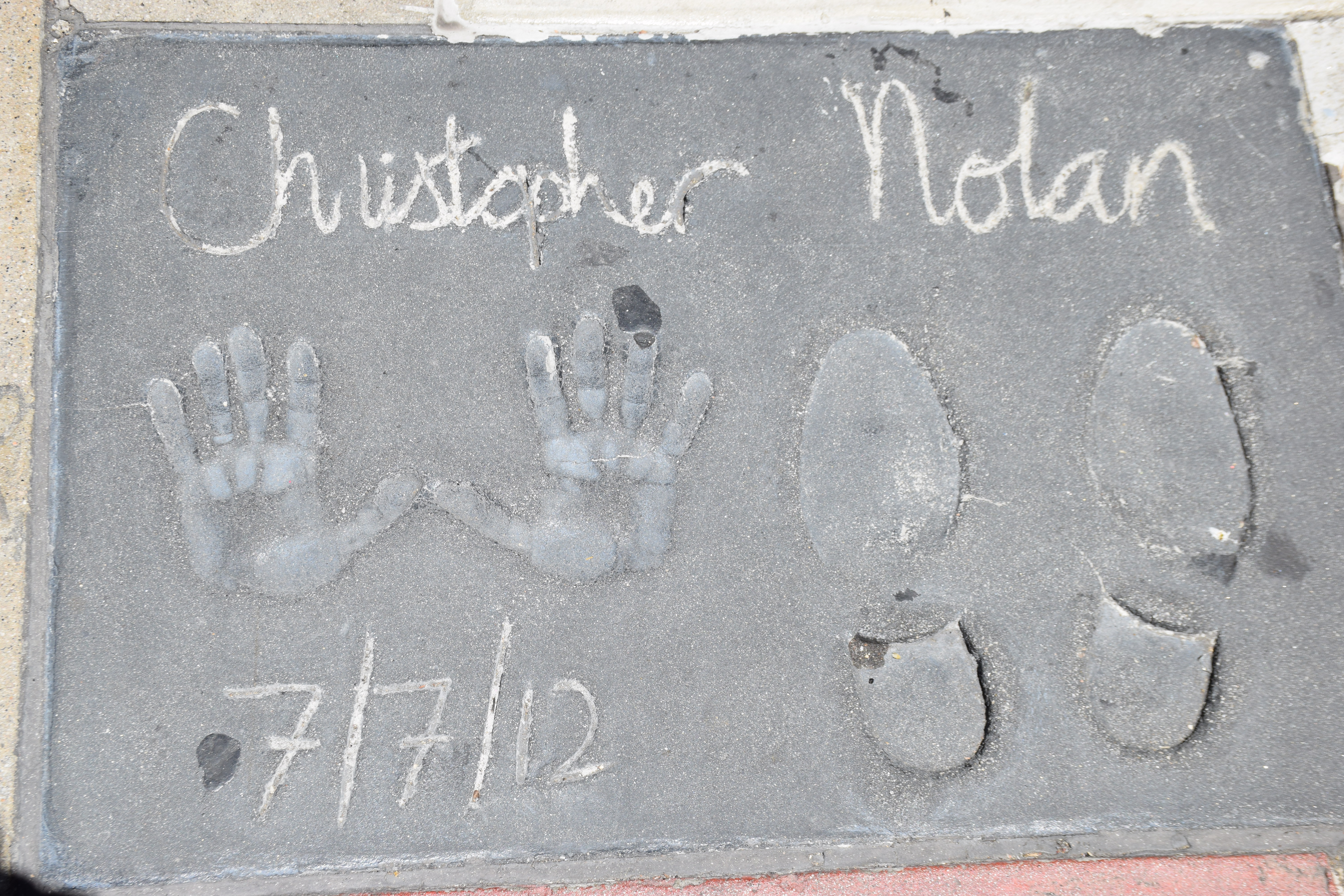
Nolan's hand and shoeprints in front of the Grauman's Chinese Theatre in Los Angeles

Nolan has been nominated for eight Academy Awards (winning two), eight British Academy Film Awards (winning two) and six Golden Globe Awards (winning one). From 2011 to 2014, he appeared in Forbes Celebrity 100 list based on his income and popularity. Nolan appeared in Time's 100 most influential people in the world in 2015.

Nolan was named an Honorary Fellow of UCL in 2006, and conferred an honorary doctorate in literature in 2017. In 2012, he became the youngest director to receive a hand-and-footprint ceremony at Grauman's Chinese Theatre in Los Angeles. He was appointed Commander of the Order of the British Empire in the 2019 New Year Honours for services to film. In 2023, he was awarded the Federation of American Scientists' Public Service Award for his depiction of scientists in his film Oppenheimer.

In 2024, Nolan received the British Film Institute Fellowship in recognition of his "extraordinary achievements and enormous contribution to cinema," and the Honorary César award from the Académie des Arts et Techniques du Cinéma for "continually push[ing] the boundaries of storytelling." In March 2024, Nolan was made a knight bachelor for his contributions to film, while his wife Emma Thomas was honoured with a damehood.

Awards and nominations received by Nolan's films
| Year | Title | Academy Awards | | BAFTA Awards | | Golden Globe Awards | |
| Year | Title | Nominations | Wins | Nominations | Wins | Nominations | Wins |
|---|---|---|---|---|---|---|---|
| 2001 | Memento | 2 | | | | 1 | |
| 2005 | Batman Begins | 1 | | 3 | | | |
| 2006 | The Prestige | 2 | | | | | |
| 2008 | The Dark Knight | 8 | 2 | 9 | 1 | 1 | 1 |
| 2010 | Inception | 8 | 4 | 9 | 3 | 4 | |
| 2012 | The Dark Knight Rises | | | 1 | | | |
| 2014 | Interstellar | 5 | 1 | 4 | 1 | 1 | |
| 2017 | Dunkirk | 8 | 3 | 8 | 1 | 3 | |
| 2020 | Tenet | 2 | 1 | 1 | 1 | 1 | |
| 2023 | Oppenheimer | 13 | 7 | 13 | 7 | 8 | 5 |
| Total | | 49 | 18 | 48 | 14 | 19 | 6 |

Directed Academy Award performances

Under Nolan's direction, these actors have received Academy Award wins and nominations for their performances in their respective roles.

| Year | Performer | Film | Result |
|---|---|---|---|
Academy Award for Best Actor
| 2023 | Cillian Murphy | Oppenheimer | Won |
Academy Award for Best Supporting Actor
| 2008 | Heath Ledger (Note: Posthumous award) | The Dark Knight | Won |
| 2023 | Robert Downey Jr. | Oppenheimer | Won |
Academy Award for Best Supporting Actress
| 2023 | Emily Blunt | Oppenheimer | Nominated |
