= List of awards and nominations received by Christopher Nolan =

Christopher Nolan awards and nominations
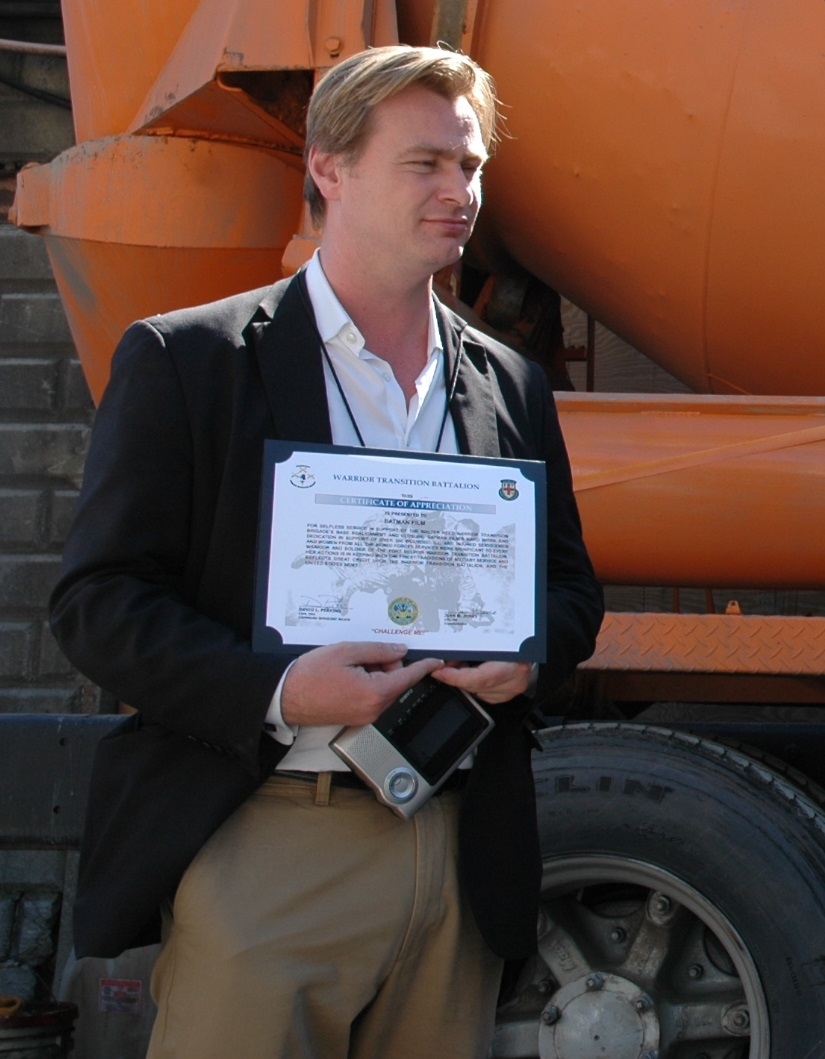
- Nolan in 2011
Awards and nominations
Award	Wins	Nominations
Academy Awards	2	8
BAFTA Awards	2	8
Golden Globe Awards	1	6
Critics' Choice Movie Awards	3	11
Directors Guild Awards	1	5
European Film Awards	0	1
Producers Guild Awards	1	4
Writers Guild Awards	1	3

Totals (Note: Certain award groups do not simply award one winner. They acknowledge several different recipients, have runners-up, and have third place. Since this is a specific recognition and is different from losing an award, runner-up mentions are considered wins in this award tally. For simplification and to avoid errors, each award in this list has been presumed to have had a prior nomination.)
- Wins: 195
- Nominations: 539

British and American filmmaker Christopher Nolan has received many awards and honours throughout his career. He has won two Academy Awards, two British Academy Film Awards, one Golden Globe Award, three Critics Choice Awards, one Directors Guild of America Award, one Producers Guild of America Awards, and one Writers Guild of America Awards. He was appointed Commander of the Order of the British Empire (CBE) in the 2019 New Year Honours for his services to film. In 2024, Nolan received the British Film Institute Fellowship for his "extraordinary achievements and enormous contribution to cinema."

At the 2001 Sundance Film Festival, Nolan and his brother Jonathan won the Waldo Salt Screenwriting Award for Memento, and in 2003 Nolan received the Sonny Bono Visionary Award from the Palm Springs International Film Festival. Festival executive director Mitch Levine said, "Nolan had in his brief time as a feature film director, redefined and advanced the very language of cinema". He was named an Honorary Fellow of UCL in 2006, and conferred an honorary doctorate in literature (DLit) in 2017. In 2009, the director received the Board of the Governors Award from the American Society of Cinematographers. In 2011 Nolan received the Britannia Award for Artistic Excellence in Directing from the British Academy of Film and Television Arts and the ACE Golden Eddie Filmmaker of the Year Award from American Cinema Editors. That year he also received the Modern Master Award, the highest honour presented by the Santa Barbara International Film Festival. In addition, Nolan was the recipient of the inaugural VES Visionary Award from the Visual Effects Society.

In 2012 he became the youngest director to be honoured with a hand-and-footprint ceremony at Grauman's Chinese Theatre in Los Angeles. Nolan received the first-ever Founder's Award from Slamdance Film Festival in 2014. The Art Directors Guild selected Nolan as the recipient of its Cinematic Imagery Award in 2015, an honour bestowed upon those whose body of work has "richly enhanced the visual aspects of the movie-going experience". He was selected as the 2015 Class Day speaker at Princeton University and was awarded the Empire Inspiration Award at the 20th Empire Awards. In the following years he received the FIAF Award from the archival community, and the inaugural Vanguard Award from The Digital Entertainment Group. The director has been honoured with career retrospectives at the Walker Art Center and Institut Lumière. In 2023, Nolan was awarded the Federation of American Scientists' Public Service Award. A year later he received the Honorary César from the Académie des Arts et Techniques du Cinéma, the Visionary Award from the Saturn Awards, and the inaugural Trailblazer Award at 2024 Sundance Film Festival. In March 2024, the British Government announced that Nolan, along with his wife and producer Emma Thomas would be awarded a knighthood and damehood respectively for their "services to film".

== Major associations ==
=== Academy Awards ===
Year	Category	Nominated work	Result	Ref.
2002	Best Original Screenplay (Note: Jonathan Nolan's short story was not published before the film was released; it was nominated for Original Screenplay instead of Best Adapted Screenplay)	Memento	Nominated	
2011	Best Picture	Inception	Nominated	
2011	Best Original Screenplay	Inception	Nominated	
2018	Best Picture	Dunkirk	Nominated	
2018	Best Director	Dunkirk	Nominated	
2024	Best Picture	Oppenheimer	Won	
2024	Best Director	Oppenheimer	Won	
2024	Best Adapted Screenplay	Oppenheimer	Nominated	

Directed Academy Award performances
Under Nolan's direction, these actors have received Academy Award nominations for their performances in their respective roles.

Year	Performer	Film	Result
Academy Award for Best Actor
2023	Cillian Murphy	Oppenheimer	Won
Academy Award for Best Supporting Actor
2008	Heath Ledger (Note: Posthumous award)	The Dark Knight	Won
2023	Robert Downey Jr.	Oppenheimer	Won
Academy Award for Best Supporting Actress
2023	Emily Blunt	Oppenheimer	Nominated

=== BAFTA Awards ===
Year	Category	Nominated work	Result	Ref.
2010	Best Film	Inception	Nominated	
2010	Best Director	Inception	Nominated	
2010	Best Original Screenplay	Inception	Nominated	
2017	Best Film	Dunkirk	Nominated	
2017	Best Director	Dunkirk	Nominated	
2023	Best Film	Oppenheimer	Won	
2023	Best Director	Oppenheimer	Won	
2023	Best Adapted Screenplay	Oppenheimer	Nominated	
Britannia Award
2010	Britannia Award for Artistic Excellence in Directing		Won	

=== Golden Globe Awards ===
Year	Category	Nominated work	Result	Ref.
2002	Best Screenplay	Memento	Nominated	
2011	Best Director	Inception	Nominated	
2011	Best Screenplay	Inception	Nominated	
2018	Best Director	Dunkirk	Nominated	
2024	Best Director	Oppenheimer	Won	
2024	Best Screenplay	Oppenheimer	Nominated	

=== Critics Choice Awards ===
Year	Category	Nominated work	Result	Ref.
2002	Best Screenplay	Memento	Won	
2009	Best Picture	The Dark Knight	Nominated	
2009	Best Director	The Dark Knight	Nominated	
2011	Best Picture	Inception	Nominated	
2011	Best Director	Inception	Nominated	
2011	Best Original Screenplay	Inception	Nominated	
2018	Best Picture	Dunkirk	Nominated	
2018	Best Director	Dunkirk	Nominated	
2024	Best Picture	Oppenheimer	Won	
2024	Best Director	Oppenheimer	Won	
2024	Best Adapted Screenplay	Oppenheimer	Nominated	

=== European Film Awards ===
Year	Category	Nominated work	Result	Ref.
2018	People's Choice Award	Dunkirk	Nominated	

=== Directors Guild of America Awards ===
Year	Category	Nominated work	Result	Ref.
2001	Outstanding Directing - Feature Film	Memento	Nominated	
2008	Outstanding Directing - Feature Film	The Dark Knight	Nominated	
2010	Outstanding Directing - Feature Film	Inception	Nominated	
2018	Outstanding Directing - Feature Film	Dunkirk	Nominated	
2024	Outstanding Directing - Feature Film	Oppenheimer	Won	

=== Producers Guild of America Awards ===
Year	Category	Nominated work	Result	Ref.
2008	Best Theatrical Motion Picture	The Dark Knight	Nominated	
2010	Best Theatrical Motion Picture	Inception	Nominated	
2017	Best Theatrical Motion Picture	Dunkirk	Nominated	
2024	Best Theatrical Motion Picture	Oppenheimer	Won	

=== Writers Guild of America Awards ===
Year	Category	Nominated work	Result	Ref.
2008	Best Adapted Screenplay	The Dark Knight	Nominated	
2010	Best Original Screenplay	Inception	Won	
2023	Best Adapted Screenplay	Oppenheimer	Nominated	

== Other associations ==
Award	Year (Note: Indicates the year of ceremony. Each year is linked to the article about the awards held that year, wherever possible.)	Category	Work	Result	Ref.
AACTA Awards	2017	Best Film	Dunkirk	Nominated	
AACTA Awards	2017	Best Direction	Dunkirk	Won	
AACTA Awards	2017	Best Screenplay	Dunkirk	Nominated	
AARP Awards	2018	Best Time Capsule	Dunkirk	Won	
AARP Awards	2018	Readers' Choice Poll	Dunkirk	Nominated	
AARP Awards	2023	Best Director	Oppenheimer	Won	
African-American Film Critics Association	2005	Best Picture	Batman Begins	Nominated	
African-American Film Critics Association	2008	Best Picture	The Dark Knight	Won	
African-American Film Critics Association	2010	Best Picture	Inception	Nominated	
African-American Film Critics Association	2010	Best Director	Inception	Won	
Alliance of Women Film Journalists	2010	Best Picture	Inception	Nominated	
Alliance of Women Film Journalists	2010	Best Director	Inception	Nominated	
Alliance of Women Film Journalists	2010	Best Original Screenplay	Inception	Nominated	
Alliance of Women Film Journalists	2017	Best Director	Dunkirk	Nominated	
Alliance of Women Film Journalists	2023	Best Film	Oppenheimer	Nominated	
Amanda Award	2011	Best Foreign Feature Film	Inception	Nominated	
Amanda Award	2015	Best Foreign Feature Film	Interstellar	Nominated	
Amanda Award	2023	Best Foreign Feature Film	Oppenheimer	Nominated	
American Cinema Editors	2011	Golden Eddie Filmmaker of the Year Award	—N/a	Won	
American Film Institute	2001	AFI Screenwriter of the Year	Memento	Won	
American Film Institute	2008	AFI Movies of the Year	The Dark Knight	Won	
American Film Institute	2010	AFI Movies of the Year	Inception	Won	
American Film Institute	2012	AFI Movies of the Year	The Dark Knight Rises	Won	
American Film Institute	2014	AFI Movies of the Year	Interstellar	Won	
American Film Institute	2017	AFI Movies of the Year	Dunkirk	Won	
American Film Institute	2023	AFI Movies of the Year	Oppenheimer	Won	
American Screenwriters Association	2002	Discover Screenwriting Award	Memento	Nominated	
American Society of Cinematographers	2009	Board of the Governors Award	—N/a	Won	
Art Directors Guild	2015	Contribution to Cinematic Imagery Award	—N/a	Won	
Atlanta Film Critics Circle	2017	Best Film	Dunkirk	Nominated	
Atlanta Film Critics Circle	2017	Best Director	Dunkirk	Won	
Atlanta Film Critics Circle	2023	Best Film	Oppenheimer	Won	
Atlanta Film Critics Circle	2023	Best Director	Oppenheimer	Won	
Atlanta Film Critics Circle	2023	Best Screenplay	Oppenheimer	Won	
Austin Film Critics Association	2006	Best Film	The Prestige	Nominated	
Austin Film Critics Association	2008	Best Film	The Dark Knight	Nominated	
Austin Film Critics Association	2008	Best Director	The Dark Knight	Won	
Austin Film Critics Association	2008	Best Adapted Screenplay	The Dark Knight	Won	
Austin Film Critics Association	2009	Best Movie of the Decade	Memento	Nominated	
Austin Film Critics Association	2009	Best Movie of the Decade	The Dark Knight	Nominated	
Austin Film Critics Association	2010	Best Film	Inception	Nominated	
Austin Film Critics Association	2017	Best Film	Dunkirk	Nominated	
Austin Film Critics Association	2017	Best Director	Dunkirk	Nominated	
Austin Film Critics Association	2023	Best Picture	Oppenheimer	Nominated	
Austin Film Critics Association	2023	Best Director	Oppenheimer	Won	
Austin Film Critics Association	2023	Best Adapted Screenplay	Oppenheimer	Won	
Australian Academy of Cinema & Television Arts International Awards	2023	Best Film	Oppenheimer	Nominated	
Australian Academy of Cinema & Television Arts International Awards	2023	Best Director	Oppenheimer	Won	
Australian Academy of Cinema & Television Arts International Awards	2023	Best Screenplay	Oppenheimer	Nominated	
Awards Circuit Community Awards	2001	Best Director	Memento	Nominated	
Awards Circuit Community Awards	2001	Best Original Screenplay	Memento	Won	
Awards Circuit Community Awards	2006	Best Adapted Screenplay	The Prestige	Nominated	
Awards Circuit Community Awards	2008	Best Motion Picture	The Dark Knight	Won	
Awards Circuit Community Awards	2008	Best Director	The Dark Knight	Won	
Awards Circuit Community Awards	2008	Best Adapted Screenplay	The Dark Knight	Won	
Awards Circuit Community Awards	2011	Best Motion Picture	Inception	Nominated	
Awards Circuit Community Awards	2011	Best Achievement in Directing	Inception	Nominated	
Awards Circuit Community Awards	2011	Best Original Screenplay	Inception	Won	
Awards Circuit Community Awards	2014	Best Motion Picture	Interstellar	Nominated	
Awards Circuit Community Awards	2014	Best Original Screenplay	Interstellar	Nominated	
Awards Circuit Community Awards	2017	Best Motion Picture	Dunkirk	Nominated	
Awards Circuit Community Awards	2017	Best Director	Dunkirk	Nominated	
Black Film Critics Circle Awards	2023	Best Film	Oppenheimer	Nominated	
Black Film Critics Circle Awards	2023	Best Adapted Screenplay	Oppenheimer	Won	
Blue Ribbon Awards	2009	Best Foreign Film	The Dark Knight	Won	
Blue Ribbon Awards	2018	Best Foreign Film	Dunkirk	Nominated	
Bodil Awards	2009	Best American Film	The Dark Knight	Nominated	
Bodil Awards	2011	Best American Film	Inception	Nominated	
Bodil Awards	2018	Best American Film	Dunkirk	Nominated	
Boston Society of Film Critics	2001	Best Screenplay	Memento	Won	
Boston Online Film Critics Association	2017	Best Picture	Dunkirk	Nominated	
Boston Online Film Critics Association	2023	Best Picture	Oppenheimer	Nominated	
Boston Online Film Critics Association	2023	Best Director	Oppenheimer	Won	
Bram Stoker Award	2002	Best Screenplay	Memento	Won	
Brazil Online Movie Award	2023	Best Movie	Oppenheimer	Nominated	
Brazil Online Movie Award	2023	Best Director	Oppenheimer	Nominated	
British Independent Film Awards	2001	Best Foreign Independent Film – English Language	Memento	Nominated	
Broadcast Film Critics Association	2001	Best Screenplay	Memento	Won	
Broadcast Film Critics Association	2001	Best Picture	Memento	Nominated	
Broadcast Film Critics Association	2008	Best Director	The Dark Knight	Nominated	
Broadcast Film Critics Association	2008	Best Action Movie	The Dark Knight	Won	
Broadcast Film Critics Association	2008	Best Picture	The Dark Knight	Nominated	
Broadcast Film Critics Association	2010	Best Director	Inception	Nominated	
Broadcast Film Critics Association	2010	Best Original Screenplay	Inception	Nominated	
Broadcast Film Critics Association	2010	Best Action Movie	Inception	Won	
Broadcast Film Critics Association	2010	Best Picture	Inception	Nominated	
Broadcast Film Critics Association	2012	Best Action Movie	The Dark Knight Rises	Nominated	
Broadcast Film Critics Association	2014	Best Sci-Fi/Horror Movie	Interstellar	Won	
Broadcast Film Critics Association	2017	Best Director	Dunkirk	Nominated	
Broadcast Film Critics Association	2017	Best Picture	Dunkirk	Nominated	
Broadcast Film Critics Association	2023	Best Director	Oppenheimer	Won	
Broadcast Film Critics Association	2023	Best Picture	Oppenheimer	Won	
Broadcast Film Critics Association	2023	Best Adapted Screenplay	Oppenheimer	Nominated	
Capri Hollywood International Film Festival	2017	Best Director	Dunkirk	Won	
Capri Hollywood International Film Festival	2023	Best Picture	Oppenheimer	Won	
Capri Hollywood International Film Festival	2023	Best Director	Oppenheimer	Won	
Central Ohio Film Critics Association	2005	Best Picture	Batman Begins	Nominated	
Central Ohio Film Critics Association	2008	Best Picture	The Dark Knight	Nominated	
Central Ohio Film Critics Association	2010	Best Picture	Inception	Won	
Central Ohio Film Critics Association	2010	Best Director	Inception	Won	
Central Ohio Film Critics Association	2010	Best Original Screenplay	Inception	Won	
Central Ohio Film Critics Association	2017	Best Picture	Dunkirk	Nominated	
Central Ohio Film Critics Association	2017	Best Director	Dunkirk	Nominated	
César Awards	2011	Best Foreign Film	Inception	Nominated	
César Awards	2018	Best Foreign Film	Dunkirk	Nominated	
César Awards	2024	Best Foreign Film	Oppenheimer	Nominated	
César Awards	2024	Honorary César	—N/a	Won	
Chicago Film Critics Association	2001	Best Screenplay	Memento	Won	
Chicago Film Critics Association	2001	Most Promising Director	Memento	Nominated	
Chicago Film Critics Association	2008	Best Picture	The Dark Knight	Nominated	
Chicago Film Critics Association	2008	Best Director	The Dark Knight	Nominated	
Chicago Film Critics Association	2008	Best Adapted Screenplay	The Dark Knight	Nominated	
Chicago Film Critics Association	2010	Best Picture	Inception	Nominated	
Chicago Film Critics Association	2010	Best Director	Inception	Nominated	
Chicago Film Critics Association	2010	Best Original Screenplay	Inception	Won	
Chicago Film Critics Association	2017	Best Picture	Dunkirk	Nominated	
Chicago Film Critics Association	2017	Best Director	Dunkirk	Won	
Chicago Film Critics Association	2023	Best Picture	Oppenheimer	Nominated	
Chicago Film Critics Association	2023	Best Director	Oppenheimer	Won	
Chicago Film Critics Association	2023	Best Adapted Screenplay	Oppenheimer	Nominated	
Chicago Indie Critics	2017	Best Studio Film	Dunkirk	Nominated	
Chicago Indie Critics	2017	Best Director	Dunkirk	Nominated	
Chicago Indie Critics	2023	Best Studio Film	Oppenheimer	Won	
Chicago Indie Critics	2023	Best Director	Oppenheimer	Won	
Chicago Indie Critics	2023	Best Adapted Screenplay	Oppenheimer	Won	
Chicago International Film Festival	2008	Career Achievement Award	—N/a	Won	
Chinese American Film Festival	2020	Golden Angel Award	Tenet	Won	
Chlotrudis Awards	2002	Best Director	Memento	Won	
Chlotrudis Awards	2002	Best Film	Memento	Nominated	
Chlotrudis Awards	2002	Best Adapted Screenplay	Memento	Nominated	
Cinema Bloggers Awards	2015	Best Director – International Competition	Interstellar	Nominated	
Cinema Bloggers Awards	2015	Best Screenplay – International Competition	Interstellar	Nominated	
Cinema for Peace	2024	Most Valuable Film of the Year	Oppenheimer	Nominated	
Cinema Writers Circle Awards	2009	Best Foreign Film (Mejor Película Extranjera)	The Dark Knight	Nominated	
Cinema Writers Circle Awards	2011	Best Foreign Film (Mejor Película Extranjera)	Inception	Nominated	
Cinema Writers Circle Awards	2015	Best Foreign Film (Mejor Película Extranjera)	Interstellar	Nominated	
Cinema Writers Circle Awards	2018	Best Foreign Film (Mejor Película Extranjera)	Dunkirk	Nominated	
Cinema Writers Circle Awards	2023	Best Foreign Film (Mejor Película Extranjera)	Oppenheimer	Nominated	
CinEuphoria Awards	2011	Best Film – Audience Award	Inception	Won	
CinEuphoria Awards	2011	Top Ten of the Year – Audience Award	Inception	Won	
CinEuphoria Awards	2011	Best Screenplay – International Competition	Inception	Won	
CinEuphoria Awards	2013	Top Ten of the Year – Audience Award	The Dark Knight Rises	Won	
Columbus Film Critics Association	2023	Best Film	Oppenheimer	Nominated	
Critics Association of Central Florida	2023	Best Picture	Oppenheimer	Won	
Critics Association of Central Florida	2023	Best Director	Oppenheimer	Won	
Critics Association of Central Florida	2023	Best Screenplay	Oppenheimer	Won	
Czech Lion Awards	2010	Best Foreign Language Film (Nejlepší zahraniční film)	Inception	Won	
Dallas–Fort Worth Film Critics Association	2001	Russell Smith Award	Memento	Won	
Dallas–Fort Worth Film Critics Association	2001	Best Picture	Memento	Nominated	
Dallas–Fort Worth Film Critics Association	2008	Best Picture	The Dark Knight	Nominated	
Dallas–Fort Worth Film Critics Association	2008	Best Director	The Dark Knight	Nominated	
Dallas–Fort Worth Film Critics Association	2010	Best Picture	Inception	Nominated	
Dallas–Fort Worth Film Critics Association	2010	Best Director	Inception	Nominated	
Dallas–Fort Worth Film Critics Association	2010	Best Screenplay	Inception	Nominated	
Dallas–Fort Worth Film Critics Association	2017	Best Picture	Dunkirk	Nominated	
Dallas–Fort Worth Film Critics Association	2017	Best Director	Dunkirk	Nominated	
Dallas–Fort Worth Film Critics Association	2023	Best Picture	Oppenheimer	Nominated	
Dallas–Fort Worth Film Critics Association	2023	Best Director	Oppenheimer	Won	
David di Donatello	2011	Best Foreign Film	Inception	Nominated	
David di Donatello	2018	Best Foreign Film	Dunkirk	Won	
David di Donatello	2024	Best Foreign Film	Oppenheimer	Nominated	
Deauville American Film Festival	2000	Grand Jury Prize	Memento	Nominated	
Deauville American Film Festival	2000	CinéLive Award	Memento	Won	
Deauville American Film Festival	2000	Critics Award	Memento	Won	
Deauville American Film Festival	2000	Jury Special Prize	Memento	Won	
Denver Film Critics Society	2010	Best Director	Inception	Nominated	
Denver Film Critics Society	2010	Best Original Screenplay	Inception	Won	
Denver Film Critics Society	2014	Best Science Fiction/Horror Film	Interstellar	Nominated	
Denver Film Critics Society	2014	Best Director	Interstellar	Nominated	
Denver Film Critics Society	2017	Best Film	Dunkirk	Nominated	
Denver Film Critics Society	2017	Best Director	Dunkirk	Won	
Denver Film Critics Society	2020	Best Science Fiction/Horror Film	Tenet	Nominated	
Denver Film Critics Society	2023	Best Film	Oppenheimer	Won	
Denver Film Critics Society	2023	Best Director	Oppenheimer	Won	
Denver Film Critics Society	2023	Best Adapted Screenplay	Oppenheimer	Nominated	
Detroit Film Critics Society	2008	Best Film	The Dark Knight	Nominated	
Detroit Film Critics Society	2008	Best Director	The Dark Knight	Nominated	
Detroit Film Critics Society	2010	Best Film	Inception	Nominated	
Detroit Film Critics Society	2010	Best Director	Inception	Nominated	
Detroit Film Critics Society	2017	Best Director	Dunkirk	Nominated	
Dinard British Film Festival	1999	Golden Hitchcock	Following	Nominated	
Dinard British Film Festival	1999	Silver Hitchcock	Following	Won	
DiscussingFilm Critic Award	2023	Best Picture	Oppenheimer	Won	
DiscussingFilm Critic Award	2023	Best Director	Oppenheimer	Won	
DiscussingFilm Critic Award	2023	Best Adapted Screenplay	Oppenheimer	Won	
Dorian Awards	2014	Visually Striking Film of the Year	Interstellar	Nominated	
Dorian Awards	2017	Director of the Year	Dunkirk	Nominated	
Dorian Awards	2017	Visually Striking Film of the Year	Dunkirk	Nominated	
Dorian Awards	2023	Director of the Year	Oppenheimer	Nominated	
Dragon Awards	2021	Best Science Fiction or Fantasy Movie	Tenet	Nominated	
Dublin Film Critics' Circle	2008	Best Film	The Dark Knight	Nominated	
Dublin Film Critics' Circle	2008	Best Director	The Dark Knight	Nominated	
Dublin Film Critics' Circle	2010	Best Film	Inception	Nominated	
Dublin Film Critics' Circle	2010	Best Director	Inception	Nominated	
Dublin Film Critics' Circle	2017	Best Film	Dunkirk	Won	
Dublin Film Critics' Circle	2017	Best Director	Dunkirk	Won	
Dublin Film Critics' Circle	2017	Best Screenplay	Dunkirk	Nominated	
Dublin Film Critics' Circle	2023	Best Film	Oppenheimer	Nominated	
Dublin Film Critics' Circle	2023	Best Director	Oppenheimer	Nominated	
Edgar Award	2002	Best Motion Picture	Memento	Won	
Empire Awards	2001	Best Director	Memento	Nominated	
Empire Awards	2006	Best Director	Batman Begins	Nominated	
Empire Awards	2007	Best Director	The Prestige	Won	
Empire Awards	2009	Best Film	The Dark Knight	Won	
Empire Awards	2009	Best Director	The Dark Knight	Won	
Empire Awards	2011	Best Film	Inception	Won	
Empire Awards	2011	Best Director	Inception	Nominated	
Empire Awards	2013	Best Film	The Dark Knight Rises	Nominated	
Empire Awards	2013	Best Director	The Dark Knight Rises	Nominated	
Empire Awards	2015	Best Director	Interstellar	Won	
Empire Awards	2015	Inspiration Award		Won	
Evening Standard British Film Awards	2011	Alexander Walker Special Award for his contribution to film	—N/a	Won	
Film Critics Circle of Australia	2011	Best Foreign Film – English Language	Inception	Nominated	
Florida Film Critics Circle	2001	Best Screenplay	Memento	Won	
Florida Film Critics Circle	2010	Best Original Screenplay	Inception	Won	
Florida Film Critics Circle	2017	Best Picture	Dunkirk	Won	
Florida Film Critics Circle	2017	Best Director	Dunkirk	Won	
Florida Film Critics Circle	2023	Best Picture	Oppenheimer	Nominated	
Florida Film Critics Circle	2023	Best Director	Oppenheimer	Nominated	
Florida Film Critics Circle	2023	Best Adapted Screenplay	Oppenheimer	Nominated	
Fotogramas de Plata	2018	Best Foreign Film (Mejor Película Extranjera)	Dunkirk	Won	
Gaudí Awards	2011	Best European Film (Millor Pel·lícula Europea)	Inception	Nominated	
Gaudí Awards	2018	Best European Film (Millor Pel·lícula Europea)	Dunkirk	Won	
Georgia Film Critics Association	2017	Best Film	Dunkirk	Nominated	
Georgia Film Critics Association	2017	Best Director	Dunkirk	Nominated	
Georgia Film Critics Association	2023	Best Picture	Oppenheimer	Won	
Georgia Film Critics Association	2023	Best Director	Oppenheimer	Won	
Georgia Film Critics Association	2023	Best Adapted Screenplay	Oppenheimer	Won	
Globes de Cristal Award	2018	Best Foreign Film (Meilleur film étranger)	Dunkirk	Nominated	
Gold Derby Awards	2009	Best Motion Picture	The Dark Knight	Nominated	
Gold Derby Awards	2009	Best Adapted Screenplay	The Dark Knight	Nominated	
Gold Derby Awards	2009	Best Director	The Dark Knight	Won	
Gold Derby Awards	2010	Director of the Decade	The Dark Knight	Nominated	
Gold Derby Awards	2010	Original Screenplay of the Decade	The Dark Knight	Nominated	
Gold Derby Awards	2010	Creative Person of the Decade	The Dark Knight	Nominated	
Gold Derby Awards	2011	Best Motion Picture	Inception	Nominated	
Gold Derby Awards	2011	Best Original Screenplay	Inception	Won	
Gold Derby Awards	2011	Best Director	Inception	Nominated	
Gold Derby Awards	2020	Director of the Decade	Inception	Nominated	
Gold Derby Awards	2020	Original Screenplay of the Decade	Inception	Nominated	
Gold Derby Awards	2020	Best Motion Picture of the Decade	Inception	Nominated	
Gold Derby Awards	2015	Best Motion Picture	Interstellar	Nominated	
Gold Derby Awards	2018	Best Motion Picture	Dunkirk	Nominated	
Gold Derby Awards	2018	Best Director	Dunkirk	Nominated	
Gold Derby Awards	2023	Best Picture	Oppenheimer	Won	
Gold Derby Awards	2023	Best Director	Oppenheimer	Won	
Gold Derby Awards	2023	Best Adapted Screenplay	Oppenheimer	Won	
Golden Eagle Awards	2013	Best Foreign Film	The Dark Knight Rises	Nominated	
Golden Eagle Awards	2018	Best Foreign Film	Dunkirk	Nominated	
Golden Rooster Awards	2024	Best Foreign Language Film	Oppenheimer	Won	
Golden Schmoes Awards	2005	Best Director of the Year	Batman Begins	Nominated	
Golden Schmoes Awards	2005	Best Screenplay of the Year	Batman Begins	Nominated	
Golden Schmoes Awards	2005	Favorite Movie of the Year	Batman Begins	Won	
Golden Schmoes Awards	2006	Best Director of the Year	The Prestige	Nominated	
Golden Schmoes Awards	2006	Best Screenplay of the Year	The Prestige	Nominated	
Golden Schmoes Awards	2008	Best Director of the Year	The Dark Knight	Won	
Golden Schmoes Awards	2008	Best Screenplay of the Year	The Dark Knight	Won	
Golden Schmoes Awards	2008	Favorite Movie of the Year	The Dark Knight	Won	
Golden Schmoes Awards	2010	Best Director of the Year	Inception	Won	
Golden Schmoes Awards	2010	Best Screenplay of the Year	Inception	Nominated	
Golden Schmoes Awards	2010	Favorite Movie of the Year	Inception	Won	
Golden Schmoes Awards	2012	Best Director of the Year	The Dark Knight Rises	Nominated	
Golden Schmoes Awards	2012	Favorite Movie of the Year	The Dark Knight Rises	Nominated	
Golden Schmoes Awards	2014	Best Director of the Year	Interstellar	Nominated	
Golden Schmoes Awards	2014	Favorite Movie of the Year	Interstellar	Nominated	
Golden Schmoes Awards	2017	Favorite Movie of the Year	Dunkirk	Nominated	
Golden Schmoes Awards	2017	Best Director of the Year	Dunkirk	Nominated	
Golden Schmoes Awards	2023	Favorite Movie of the Year	Oppenheimer	Won	
Golden Schmoes Awards	2023	Most Overrated Movie of the Year	Oppenheimer	Nominated	
Golden Schmoes Awards	2023	Best Director of the Year	Oppenheimer	Won	
Golden Schmoes Awards	2023	Best Screenplay of the Year	Oppenheimer	Won	
Goya Awards	2009	Best European Film (Mejor Película Europea)	The Dark Knight	Nominated	
Grande Prêmio do Cinema Brasileiro	2011	Best Foreign-Language Film (Melhor Filme Estrangeiro)	Inception	Nominated	
Greater Western New York Film Critics Association	2023	Best Picture	Oppenheimer	Nominated	
Greater Western New York Film Critics Association	2023	Best Director	Oppenheimer	Won	
Greater Western New York Film Critics Association	2023	Best Adapted Screenplay	Oppenheimer	Won	
Hawaii Film Critics Society	2023	Best Director	Oppenheimer	Won	
Hawaii Film Critics Society	2023	Best Adapted Screenplay	Oppenheimer	Won	
Heartland International Film Festival	2014	Truly Moving Picture Award	Interstellar	Won	
Heartland International Film Festival	2023	Truly Moving Picture Award	Oppenheimer	Won	
Hochi Film Award	2009	Best Foreign Language Film	The Dark Knight	Won	
Hochi Film Award	2021	Best Foreign Language Film	Tenet	Won	
Hollywood Creative Alliance	2023	Best Picture	Oppenheimer	Nominated	
Hollywood Creative Alliance	2023	Best Director	Oppenheimer	Won	
Hollywood Creative Alliance	2023	Best Adapted Screenplay	Oppenheimer	Nominated	
Hollywood Critics Association	2021	Best Action Film	Tenet	Nominated	
Hollywood Critics Association	2021	Best Blockbuster Film	Tenet	Nominated	
Hollywood Film Festival	2008	Hollywood Movie of the Year	The Dark Knight	Won	
Hollywood Film Festival	2010	Hollywood Movie of the Year	Inception	Won	
Houston Film Critics Society	2008	Best Film	The Dark Knight	Nominated	
Houston Film Critics Society	2008	Best Director	The Dark Knight	Nominated	
Houston Film Critics Society	2008	Best Screenplay	The Dark Knight	Nominated	
Houston Film Critics Society	2010	Best Film	Inception	Nominated	
Houston Film Critics Society	2010	Best Director	Inception	Nominated	
Houston Film Critics Society	2010	Best Screenplay	Inception	Nominated	
Houston Film Critics Society	2017	Best Film	Dunkirk	Nominated	
Houston Film Critics Society	2017	Best Director	Dunkirk	Nominated	
Houston Film Critics Society	2023	Best Picture	Oppenheimer	Nominated	
Houston Film Critics Society	2023	Best Director	Oppenheimer	Won	
Houston Film Critics Society	2023	Best Screenplay	Oppenheimer	Nominated	
Huading Awards	2021	Best Global Motion Picture	Tenet	Won	
Hugo Award	2006	Best Dramatic Presentation – Long Form	Batman Begins	Nominated	
Hugo Award	2007	Best Dramatic Presentation – Long Form	The Prestige	Nominated	
Hugo Award	2009	Best Dramatic Presentation – Long Form	The Dark Knight	Nominated	
Hugo Award	2011	Best Dramatic Presentation – Long Form	Inception	Won	
Hugo Award	2015	Best Dramatic Presentation – Long Form	Interstellar	Nominated	
Hugo Award	2021	Best Dramatic Presentation – Long Form	Tenet	Nominated	
IGN Awards	2010	Best Film	Inception	Won	
IGN Awards	2010	Best Director	Inception	Won	
IGN Awards	2010	Best Sci-Fi Movie	Inception	Nominated	
IGN Awards	2017	People's Choice Award for Best Drama Movie	Dunkirk	Won	
IGN Awards	2017	People's Choice Award for Best Director	Dunkirk	Won	
IGN Awards	2017	Best Movie Director	Dunkirk	Nominated	
IGN Awards	2017	Best Director	Dunkirk	Nominated	
IGN Awards	2021	Best Sci-Fi/Fantasy Movie	Tenet	Won	
IGN Awards	2021	People's Choice Award, Best Movie	Tenet	Won	
Independent Spirit Awards	2001	Best Feature	Memento	Won	
Independent Spirit Awards	2001	Best Director	Memento	Won	
Independent Spirit Awards	2001	Best Screenplay	Memento	Won	
Indiana Film Journalists Association	2010	Best Film	Inception	Nominated	
Indiana Film Journalists Association	2010	Best Director	Inception	Won	
Indiana Film Journalists Association	2010	Best Screenplay	Inception	Nominated	
Indiana Film Journalists Association	2012	Best Director	The Dark Knight Rises	Nominated	
Indiana Film Journalists Association	2017	Best Film	Dunkirk	Nominated	
Indiana Film Journalists Association	2017	Best Director	Dunkirk	Nominated	
Indiana Film Journalists Association	2017	Best Original Screenplay	Dunkirk	Nominated	
Indiana Film Journalists Association	2017	Original Vision	Dunkirk	Nominated	
Indiana Film Journalists Association	2023	Best Film	Oppenheimer	Nominated	
Indiana Film Journalists Association	2023	Best Adapted Screenplay	Oppenheimer	Nominated	
Indiana Film Journalists Association	2023	Best Director	Oppenheimer	Nominated	
International Catholic Film Critics Association	2023	Best Picture	Oppenheimer	Won	
International Catholic Film Critics Association	2023	Best Director	Oppenheimer	Won	
International Catholic Film Critics Association	2023	Best Adapted Screenplay	Oppenheimer	Won	
International Cinephile Society	2008	Best Film	The Dark Knight	Nominated	
International Cinephile Society	2008	Best Director	The Dark Knight	Won	
International Cinephile Society	2008	Best Adapted Screenplay	The Dark Knight	Nominated	
International Cinephile Society	2010	Best Film	Inception	Nominated	
International Federation of Film Archives	2017	FIAF Award	—N/a	Won	
Iowa Film Critics Awards	2011	Best Director	Inception	Nominated	
Iowa Film Critics Awards	2017	Best Picture	Dunkirk	Nominated	
Iowa Film Critics Awards	2017	Best Director	Dunkirk	Nominated	
Iowa Film Critics Awards	2023	Best Film	Oppenheimer	Nominated	
Iowa Film Critics Awards	2023	Best Director	Oppenheimer	Won	
Irish Film & Television Academy	2006	Best International Film	Batman Begins	Nominated	
Irish Film & Television Academy	2011	Best International Film	Inception	Nominated	
Irish Film & Television Academy	2018	Best International Film	Dunkirk	Nominated	
Irish Film & Television Academy	2024	Best International Film	Oppenheimer	Won	
Italian National Syndicate of Film Journalists	2011	Best Non-European Director (Regista del Miglior Film Non-Europeo)	Inception	Nominated	
Japan Academy Film Prize	2009	Best Foreign Film	The Dark Knight	Won	
Japan Academy Film Prize	2011	Best Foreign Film	Inception	Nominated	
Japan Academy Film Prize	2013	Best Foreign Film	The Dark Knight Rises	Nominated	
Japan Academy Film Prize	2015	Best Foreign Film	Interstellar	Nominated	
Japan Academy Film Prize	2018	Best Foreign Film	Dunkirk	Nominated	
Japan Academy Film Prize	2021	Best Foreign Film	Tenet	Nominated	
Kansas City Film Critics Circle	2008	Best Science Fiction, Fantasy or Horror Film	The Dark Knight	Won	
Kansas City Film Critics Circle	2010	Best Director	Inception	Won	
Kansas City Film Critics Circle	2010	Best Screenplay – Original	Inception	Won	
Kansas City Film Critics Circle	2010	Best Science Fiction, Fantasy or Horror Film	Inception	Won	
Kansas City Film Critics Circle	2023	Best Film	Oppenheimer	Won	
Kansas City Film Critics Circle	2023	Best Director	Oppenheimer	Won	
Kinema Junpo Awards	2011	Best Foreign Language Film	Inception	Nominated	
Kinéo Awards	2024	Best International Film	Oppenheimer	Won	
Las Vegas Film Critics Society	2001	Best Screenplay	Memento	Won	
Las Vegas Film Critics Society	2010	Best Picture	Inception	Nominated	
Las Vegas Film Critics Society	2010	Best Director	Inception	Nominated	
Las Vegas Film Critics Society	2010	Best Screenplay	Inception	Nominated	
Las Vegas Film Critics Society	2017	Best Picture	Dunkirk	Nominated	
Las Vegas Film Critics Society	2017	Best Director	Dunkirk	Nominated	
Las Vegas Film Critics Society	2023	Best Picture	Oppenheimer	Won	
Las Vegas Film Critics Society	2023	Best Director	Oppenheimer	Won	
Las Vegas Film Critics Society	2023	Best Adapted Screenplay	Oppenheimer	Nominated	
Latino Entertainment Journalists Association	2023	Best Picture	Oppenheimer	Nominated	
Latino Entertainment Journalists Association	2023	Best Picture	Oppenheimer	Won	
Latino Entertainment Journalists Association	2023	Best Adapted Screenplay	Oppenheimer	Nominated	
London Film Critics' Circle	2000	Film of the Year	Memento	Nominated	
London Film Critics' Circle	2000	British Director of the Year	Memento	Nominated	
London Film Critics' Circle	2000	British Screenwriter of the Year	Memento	Nominated	
London Film Critics' Circle	2002	British Director of the Year	Insomnia	Won	
London Film Critics' Circle	2005	British Director of the Year	Batman Begins	Nominated	
London Film Critics' Circle	2006	British Director of the Year	The Prestige	Nominated	
London Film Critics' Circle	2008	British Director of the Year	The Dark Knight	Nominated	
London Film Critics' Circle	2010	Director of the Year	Inception	Nominated	
London Film Critics' Circle	2010	British Director of the Year	Inception	Nominated	
London Film Critics' Circle	2017	Film of the Year	Dunkirk	Nominated	
London Film Critics' Circle	2017	Best British or Irish Film of the Year	Dunkirk	Won	
London Film Critics' Circle	2017	Director of the Year	Dunkirk	Nominated	
London Film Critics' Circle	2023	Film of the Year	Oppenheimer	Nominated	
London Film Critics' Circle	2023	Director of the Year	Oppenheimer	Nominated	
London Film Critics' Circle	2023	Screenwriter of the Year	Oppenheimer	Nominated	
Los Angeles Film Critics Association	2001	Best Screenplay	Memento	Won	
Los Angeles Film Critics Association	2008	Best Picture	The Dark Knight	Nominated	
Los Angeles Film Critics Association	2008	Best Director	The Dark Knight	Nominated	
Los Angeles Online Film Critics Society	2017	Best Male Director	Dunkirk	Nominated	
Los Angeles Online Film Critics Society	2017	Best Blockbuster	Dunkirk	Nominated	
Los Angeles Online Film Critics Society	2017	Best Action/War Movie	Dunkirk	Nominated	
Mainichi Film Awards	2009	Best Foreign Film	The Dark Knight	Won	
Mainichi Film Awards	2018	Best Foreign Film	Dunkirk	Nominated	
Michigan Movie Critics Guild	2023	Best Director	Oppenheimer	Nominated	
Minnesota Film Critics Association	2023	Best Picture	Oppenheimer	Won	
Minnesota Film Critics Association	2023	Best Director	Oppenheimer	Won	
MTV Movie & TV Awards	2002	Best New Filmmaker	Memento	Won	
MTV Movie & TV Awards	2006	Best Movie	Batman Begins	Nominated	
MTV Movie & TV Awards	2009	Best Movie	The Dark Knight	Nominated	
MTV Movie & TV Awards	2011	Best Movie	Inception	Nominated	
MTV Movie & TV Awards	2013	Best Movie	The Dark Knight Rises	Nominated	
Music City Film Critics’ Association	2023	Best Picture	Oppenheimer	Won	
Music City Film Critics’ Association	2023	Best Director	Oppenheimer	Won	
National Board of Review	2001	Top Ten Films	Memento	Won	
National Board of Review	2008	Top Ten Films	The Dark Knight	Won	
National Board of Review	2010	Top Ten Films	Inception	Won	
National Board of Review	2017	Top Ten Films	Dunkirk	Won	
National Society of Film Critics	2002	Best Screenplay	Memento	Nominated	
National Society of Film Critics	2024	Best Picture	Oppenheimer	Nominated	
National Society of Film Critics	2024	Best Director	Oppenheimer	Nominated	
Nevada Film Critics Society	2023	Best Film	Oppenheimer	Won	
Nevada Film Critics Society	2023	Best Director	Oppenheimer	Won	
Nevada Film Critics Society	2023	Best Adapted Screenplay	Oppenheimer	Won	
New York Film Critics Circle	2001	Best Screenplay	Memento	Nominated	
New York Film Critics Circle	2023	Best Director	Oppenheimer	Won	
New York Film Critics Online	2008	Top 10 Films	The Dark Knight	Won	
New York Film Critics Online	2010	Top 10 Films	Inception	Won	
New York Film Critics Online	2017	Top 10 Films	Dunkirk	Won	
New York Film Critics Online	2023	Top 10 Films	Oppenheimer	Won	
New York Film Critics Online	2023	Best Director	Oppenheimer	Won	
Newport International Film Festival	1999	Best Film	Following	Nominated	
Newport International Film Festival	1999	Best Director	Following	Won	
Nikkan Sports Film Award	2017	Best Foreign Film	Dunkirk	Won	
Nikkan Sports Film Award	2020	Best Foreign Film	Tenet	Nominated	
North Carolina Film Critics Association	2017	Best Director	Dunkirk	Nominated	
North Carolina Film Critics Association	2023	Best Narrative Film	Oppenheimer	Won	
North Carolina Film Critics Association	2023	Best Director	Oppenheimer	Won	
North Carolina Film Critics Association	2023	Best Adapted Screenplay	Oppenheimer	Won	
North Dakota Film Society Awards	2023	Best Picture	Oppenheimer	Won	
North Dakota Film Society Awards	2023	Best Director	Oppenheimer	Won	
North Texas Film Critics Association	2010	Best Picture	Inception	Won	
North Texas Film Critics Association	2010	Best Director	Inception	Won	
North Texas Film Critics Association	2017	Best Picture	Dunkirk	Nominated	
North Texas Film Critics Association	2017	Best Director	Dunkirk	Nominated	
North Texas Film Critics Association	2023	Best Picture	Oppenheimer	Won	
North Texas Film Critics Association	2023	Best Director	Oppenheimer	Won	
North Texas Film Critics Association	2023	Best Screenplay	Oppenheimer	Nominated	
Oklahoma Film Critics Circle	2008	Best Film	The Dark Knight	Nominated	
Oklahoma Film Critics Circle	2010	Best Film	Inception	Nominated	
Oklahoma Film Critics Circle	2010	Best Original Screenplay	Inception	Won	
Oklahoma Film Critics Circle	2017	Best Film	Dunkirk	Nominated	
Oklahoma Film Critics Circle	2023	Best Film	Oppenheimer	Nominated	
Online Association of Female Film Critics	2023	Best Film	Oppenheimer	Nominated	
Online Association of Female Film Critics	2023	Best Director	Oppenheimer	Nominated	
Online Film Critics Society	2001	Best Picture	Memento	Won	
Online Film Critics Society	2001	Best Director	Memento	Nominated	
Online Film Critics Society	2001	Best Adapted Screenplay	Memento	Won	
Online Film Critics Society	2001	Best Breakthrough Filmmaker	Memento	Won	
Online Film Critics Society	2006	Best Adapted Screenplay	The Prestige	Nominated	
Online Film Critics Society	2008	Best Picture	The Dark Knight	Nominated	
Online Film Critics Society	2008	Best Director	The Dark Knight	Won	
Online Film Critics Society	2008	Best Adapted Screenplay	The Dark Knight	Nominated	
Online Film Critics Society	2010	Best Picture	Inception	Nominated	
Online Film Critics Society	2010	Best Director	Inception	Nominated	
Online Film Critics Society	2010	Best Original Screenplay	Inception	Won	
Online Film Critics Society	2017	Best Picture	Dunkirk	Nominated	
Online Film Critics Society	2017	Best Director	Dunkirk	Won	
Online Film Critics Society	2023	Best Picture	Oppenheimer	Won	
Online Film Critics Society	2023	Best Director	Oppenheimer	Won	
Online Film Critics Society	2023	Best Adapted Screenplay	Oppenheimer	Won	
Online Film & Television Association	2001	Best Writing, Screenplay Written Directly for the Screen	Memento	Won	
Online Film & Television Association	2001	Best Director	Memento	Nominated	
Online Film & Television Association	2009	Best Picture	The Dark Knight	Nominated	
Online Film & Television Association	2009	Best Director	The Dark Knight	Nominated	
Online Film & Television Association	2011	Best Picture	Inception	Nominated	
Online Film & Television Association	2011	Best Director	Inception	Nominated	
Online Film & Television Association	2011	Best Writing, Screenplay Written Directly for the Screen	Inception	Won	
Online Film & Television Association	2017	Best Picture	Dunkirk	Nominated	
Online Film & Television Association	2017	Best Director	Dunkirk	Nominated	
Online Film & Television Association	2023	Best Picture	Oppenheimer	Won	
Online Film & Television Association	2023	Best Director	Oppenheimer	Won	
Online Film & Television Association	2023	Best Adapted Screenplay	Oppenheimer	Won	
Palm Springs International Film Festival	2003	Sonny Bono Visionary Award	—N/a	Won	
People's Choice Awards	2006	Favorite Movie	Batman Begins	Nominated	
People's Choice Awards	2006	Favorite Movie Drama	Batman Begins	Nominated	
People's Choice Awards	2009	Favorite Movie	The Dark Knight	Won	
People's Choice Awards	2009	Favorite Action Movie	The Dark Knight	Won	
People's Choice Awards	2011	Favorite Movie	Inception	Nominated	
People's Choice Awards	2011	Favorite Movie Drama	Inception	Nominated	
People's Choice Awards	2013	Favorite Movie	The Dark Knight Rises	Nominated	
People's Choice Awards	2013	Favorite Action Movie	The Dark Knight Rises	Nominated	
People's Choice Awards	2020	Favorite Action Movie	Tenet	Nominated	
Philadelphia Film Critics Circle	2023	Best Film	Oppenheimer	Nominated	
Philadelphia Film Critics Circle	2023	Best Director	Oppenheimer	Nominated	
Philadelphia Film Critics Circle	2023	Best Screenplay	Oppenheimer	Nominated	
Phoenix Critics Circle	2001	Best Picture	Memento	Nominated	
Phoenix Critics Circle	2001	Best Director	Memento	Nominated	
Phoenix Critics Circle	2001	Best Original Screenplay	Memento	Won	
Phoenix Critics Circle	2001	Best Newcomer	Memento	Won	
Phoenix Critics Circle	2008	Best Picture	The Dark Knight	Nominated	
Phoenix Critics Circle	2010	Best Picture	Inception	Nominated	
Phoenix Critics Circle	2010	Best Director	Inception	Won	
Phoenix Critics Circle	2010	Best Original Screenplay	Inception	Won	
Phoenix Critics Circle	2017	Best Picture	Dunkirk	Nominated	
Phoenix Critics Circle	2017	Best Director	Dunkirk	Won	
Phoenix Critics Circle	2023	Best Picture	Oppenheimer	Nominated	
Phoenix Critics Circle	2023	Best Director	Oppenheimer	Nominated	
Phoenix Film Critics Society	2023	Best Picture	Oppenheimer	Nominated	
Phoenix Film Critics Society	2023	Best Director	Oppenheimer	Won	
Portland Critics Association	2023	Best Picture	Oppenheimer	Won	
Portland Critics Association	2023	Best Director	Oppenheimer	Won	
Portland Critics Association	2023	Best Screenplay	Oppenheimer	Won	
Rembrandt Award	2009	Best International Film (Beste Buitenlandse Film)	The Dark Knight	Nominated	
Rembrandt Award	2010	Best International Film (Beste Buitenlandse Film)	Inception	Won	
Robert Festival	2003	Best American Film (Årets amerikanske film)	Insomnia	Nominated	
Robert Festival	2009	Best American Film (Årets amerikanske film)	The Dark Knight	Nominated	
Robert Festival	2011	Best American Film (Årets amerikanske film)	Inception	Won	
Robert Festival	2013	Best American Film (Årets amerikanske film)	The Dark Knight Rises	Nominated	
Robert Festival	2015	Best American Film (Årets amerikanske film)	Interstellar	Nominated	
Robert Festival	2018	Best Non-American Film (Årets ikke-amerikanske film)	Dunkirk	Nominated	
Robert Festival	2024	English-language Film of the Year (Årets engelsksprogede film)	Oppenheimer	Won	
Rondo Hatton Classic Horror Awards	2005	Best Film	Batman Begins	Nominated	
Rondo Hatton Classic Horror Awards	2006	Best Film	The Prestige	Nominated	
Rondo Hatton Classic Horror Awards	2008	Best Film	The Dark Knight	Won	
Rondo Hatton Classic Horror Awards	2010	Best Film	Inception	Nominated	
Rondo Hatton Classic Horror Awards	2012	Best Film	The Dark Knight Rises	Nominated	
Rondo Hatton Classic Horror Awards	2014	Best Film	Interstellar	Nominated	
Rotterdam International Film Festival	1999	Best Film	Following	Won	
Russian National Movie Awards	2008	Best Blockbuster Movie	The Prestige	Nominated	
Russian National Movie Awards	2009	Best Blockbuster Movie	The Dark Knight	Won	
Russian National Movie Awards	2011	Best Foreign Action Movie	Inception	Won	
Russian National Movie Awards	2011	Best Foreign Drama Movie	Inception	Nominated	
Russian National Movie Awards	2011	True Movie – People's Choice	Inception	Won	
Russian National Movie Awards	2013	Best Foreign Action of the Year	The Dark Knight Rises	Nominated	
Russian National Movie Awards	2013	Best Foreign Drama of the Year	The Dark Knight Rises	Nominated	
Russian National Movie Awards	2015	Best Foreign Drama of the Year	Interstellar	Won	
San Diego Film Critics Society	2010	Best Film	Inception	Nominated	
San Diego Film Critics Society	2010	Best Director	Inception	Nominated	
San Diego Film Critics Society	2010	Best Original Screenplay	Inception	Nominated	
San Diego Film Critics Society	2017	Best Picture	Dunkirk	Nominated	
San Diego Film Critics Society	2017	Best Director	Dunkirk	Nominated	
San Diego Film Critics Society	2017	Best Original Screenplay	Dunkirk	Nominated	
San Diego Film Critics Society	2023	Best Picture	Oppenheimer	Nominated	
San Diego Film Critics Society	2023	Best Director	Oppenheimer	Nominated	
San Diego Film Critics Society	2023	Best Adapted Screenplay	Oppenheimer	Nominated	
San Francisco Film Critics Circle	2017	Best Director	Dunkirk	Nominated	
San Francisco Film Critics Circle	2023	Best Picture	Oppenheimer	Won	
San Francisco Film Critics Circle	2023	Best Director	Oppenheimer	Nominated	
San Francisco Film Critics Circle	2023	Best Adapted Screenplay	Oppenheimer	Nominated	
San Francisco International Film Festival	1998	Best First Feature (SKYY Prize)	Following	Won	
Santa Barbara International Film Festival	2011	Modern Master Award	—N/a	Won	
Santa Barbara International Film Festival	2018	Outstanding Director of the Year	—N/a	Won	
Satellite Awards	2002	Best Original Screenplay	Memento	Nominated	
Satellite Awards	2002	Best Director	Memento	Nominated	
Satellite Awards	2002	Best Film	Memento	Nominated	
Satellite Awards	2008	Best Director	The Dark Knight	Nominated	
Satellite Awards	2011	Best Director	Inception	Nominated	
Satellite Awards	2011	Best Original Screenplay	Inception	Nominated	
Satellite Awards	2011	Best Film	Inception	Nominated	
Satellite Awards	2017	Best Film	Dunkirk	Nominated	
Satellite Awards	2017	Best Director	Dunkirk	Nominated	
Satellite Awards	2017	Best Original Screenplay	Dunkirk	Nominated	
Satellite Awards	2021	Best Film	Tenet	Nominated	
Satellite Awards	2024	Best Film	Oppenheimer	Won	
Satellite Awards	2024	Best Director	Oppenheimer	Won	
Satellite Awards	2024	Best Original Screenplay	Oppenheimer	Nominated	
Saturn Award	2001	Best Action/Adventure/Thriller Film	Memento	Won	
Saturn Award	2005	Best Fantasy Film	Batman Begins	Won	
Saturn Award	2005	Best Director	Batman Begins	Nominated	
Saturn Award	2005	Best Writing	Batman Begins	Won	
Saturn Award	2006	Best Science Fiction Film	The Prestige	Nominated	
Saturn Award	2008	Best Action or Adventure Film	The Dark Knight	Won	
Saturn Award	2008	Best Director	The Dark Knight	Nominated	
Saturn Award	2008	Best Writing	The Dark Knight	Won	
Saturn Award	2010	Best Science Fiction Film	Inception	Won	
Saturn Award	2010	Best Director	Inception	Won	
Saturn Award	2010	Best Writing	Inception	Won	
Saturn Award	2012	Best Action or Adventure Film	The Dark Knight Rises	Nominated	
Saturn Award	2012	Best Director	The Dark Knight Rises	Nominated	
Saturn Award	2013	Best Comic-to-Film Motion Picture	Man of Steel	Nominated	
Saturn Award	2014	Best Science Fiction Film	Interstellar	Won	
Saturn Award	2014	Best Director	Interstellar	Nominated	
Saturn Award	2014	Best Writing	Interstellar	Won	
Saturn Award	2017	Best Action or Adventure Film	Dunkirk	Nominated	
Saturn Award	2021	Best Science Fiction Film	Tenet	Nominated	
Saturn Award	2021	Best Director	Tenet	Nominated	
Saturn Award	2021	Best Writing	Tenet	Nominated	
Saturn Award	2024	Best Thriller Film	Oppenheimer	Won	
Saturn Award	2024	Best Director	Oppenheimer	Nominated	
Saturn Award	2024	Best Writing	Oppenheimer	Nominated	
Saturn Award	2024	Visionary Award	-	Won	
Scream Awards	2005	Best Best Scream-Play	Batman Begins	Won	
Scream Awards	2005	Best Director	Batman Begins	Won	
Scream Awards	2008	Best Best Scream-Play	The Dark Knight	Won	
Scream Awards	2008	Best Director	The Dark Knight	Won	
Scream Awards	2008	Best Comic Book Movie	The Dark Knight	Won	
Scream Awards	2008	The Ultimate Scream	The Dark Knight	Won	
Scream Awards	2010	Best Best Scream-Play	Inception	Nominated	
Scream Awards	2010	The Ultimate Scream	Inception	Won	
Scream Awards	2010	Best Sci-Fi Movie	Inception	Won	
Scream Awards	2010	Best Director	Inception	Nominated	
Scream Awards	2021	Best Science Fiction Movie	Tenet	Nominated	
Screenwriters Choice Awards, Online	2014	Best Original Screenplay	Interstellar	Nominated	
Seattle Film Critics Society	2017	Best Film	Dunkirk	Nominated	
Seattle Film Critics Society	2017	Best Director	Dunkirk	Won	
Seattle Film Critics Society	2023	Best Picture	Oppenheimer	Nominated	
Seattle Film Critics Society	2023	Best Director	Oppenheimer	Nominated	
SESC Film Festival	2013	Best Foreign Film (Melhor Filme Estrangeiro)	The Dark Knight Rises	Nominated	
SFX Awards	2005	Best Director	Batman Begins	Nominated	
SFX Awards	2006	Best Director	The Prestige	Won	
SFX Awards	2008	Best Director	The Dark Knight	Won	
SFX Awards	2008	Best Film	The Dark Knight	Won	
SFX Awards	2010	Best Film	Inception	Won	
SFX Awards	2010	Best Director	Inception	Nominated	
SFX Awards	2012	Best Director	The Dark Knight Rises	Nominated	
ShoWest Convention	2008	Director of the Year	—N/a	Won	
Sitges Film Festival	2000	Catalan Screenwriter's Critic and Writer's Association Prize	Memento	Won	
Slamdance Film Festival	1999	Grand Jury Prize	Following	Nominated	
Slamdance Film Festival	1999	Black & White Award	Following	Won	
Slamdance Film Festival	2014	Founder's Award	—N/a	Won	
Southeastern Film Critics Association	2001	Best Picture	Memento	Won	
Southeastern Film Critics Association	2001	Best Original Screenplay	Memento	Won	
Southeastern Film Critics Association	2008	Best Picture	The Dark Knight	Nominated	
Southeastern Film Critics Association	2010	Best Picture	Inception	Nominated	
Southeastern Film Critics Association	2010	Best Director	Inception	Nominated	
Southeastern Film Critics Association	2010	Best Original Screenplay	Inception	Nominated	
Southeastern Film Critics Association	2017	Best Picture	Dunkirk	Nominated	
Southeastern Film Critics Association	2017	Best Director	Dunkirk	Nominated	
Southeastern Film Critics Association	2023	Best Picture	Oppenheimer	Won	
Southeastern Film Critics Association	2023	Best Director	Oppenheimer	Won	
Southeastern Film Critics Association	2023	Best Adapted Screenplay	Oppenheimer	Won	
St. Louis Film Critics Association	2001	Best Screenplay	Memento	Nominated	
St. Louis Film Critics Association	2010	Best Picture	Inception	Nominated	
St. Louis Film Critics Association	2010	Best Director	Inception	Nominated	
St. Louis Film Critics Association	2010	Best Screenplay	Inception	Nominated	
St. Louis Film Critics Association	2020	Best Action Film	Tenet	Won	
St. Louis Film Critics Association	2023	Best Film	Oppenheimer	Won	
St. Louis Film Critics Association	2023	Best Director	Oppenheimer	Won	
St. Louis Film Critics Association	2023	Best Adapted Screenplay	Oppenheimer	Won	
Sundance Film Festival	2001	Grand Jury Prize – Dramatic	Memento	Nominated	
Sundance Film Festival	2001	Waldo Salt Screenwriting Award	Memento	Won	
Sundance Film Festival	2024	Trailblazer Award	—N/a	Won	
The Digital Entertainment Group	2018	Vanguard Award	—N/a	Won	
Toronto Film Critics Association	2001	Best Picture	Memento	Won	
Toronto Film Critics Association	2001	Best Screenplay	Memento	Won	
Toronto Film Critics Association	2010	Best Director	Inception	Nominated	
UK Film Critics Association	2023	Best Film	Oppenheimer	Won	
UK Film Critics Association	2023	Best Director	Oppenheimer	Won	
UK Film Critics Association	2023	Best Screenplay	Oppenheimer	Nominated	
USC Scripter Awards	2024	Film	Oppenheimer	Nominated	
Utah Film Critics Association Awards	2008	Best Film	The Dark Knight	Won	
Utah Film Critics Association Awards	2008	Best Director	The Dark Knight	Nominated	
Utah Film Critics Association Awards	2010	Best Film	Inception	Nominated	
Utah Film Critics Association Awards	2010	Best Director	Inception	Won	
Utah Film Critics Association Awards	2010	Best Screenplay	Inception	Nominated	
Utah Film Critics Association Awards	2017	Best Film	Dunkirk	Nominated	
Utah Film Critics Association Awards	2017	Best Director	Dunkirk	Won	
Utah Film Critics Association Awards	2023	Best Picture	Oppenheimer	Nominated	
Utah Film Critics Association Awards	2023	Best Achievement in Directing	Oppenheimer	Nominated	
Utah Film Critics Association Awards	2023	Best Adapted Screenplay	Oppenheimer	Nominated	
Vancouver Film Critics Circle	2001	Best Film	Memento	Won	
Vancouver Film Critics Circle	2011	Best Screenplay	Inception	Nominated	
Vancouver Film Critics Circle	2017	Best Picture	Dunkirk	Nominated	
Vancouver Film Critics Circle	2017	Best Director	Dunkirk	Nominated	
Vancouver Film Critics Circle	2024	Best Picture	Oppenheimer	Nominated	
Vancouver Film Critics Circle	2024	Best Director	Oppenheimer	Won	
Vancouver Film Critics Circle	2024	Best Screenplay	Oppenheimer	Nominated	
VHS Awards	2023	Best Film	Oppenheimer	Nominated	
VHS Awards	2023	Best Director	Oppenheimer	Nominated	
VHS Awards	2023	Best Adapted Screenplay	Oppenheimer	Nominated	
Visual Effects Society	2011	Visionary Award	—N/a	Won	
Washington D.C. Area Film Critics Association	2010	Best Film	Inception	Nominated	
Washington D.C. Area Film Critics Association	2010	Best Director	Inception	Nominated	
Washington D.C. Area Film Critics Association	2010	Best Original Screenplay	Inception	Won	
Washington D.C. Area Film Critics Association	2017	Best Film	Dunkirk	Nominated	
Washington D.C. Area Film Critics Association	2017	Best Director	Dunkirk	Won	
Washington D.C. Area Film Critics Association	2023	Best Film	Oppenheimer	Nominated	
Washington D.C. Area Film Critics Association	2023	Best Director	Oppenheimer	Won	
Washington D.C. Area Film Critics Association	2023	Best Adapted Screenplay	Oppenheimer	Nominated	

== Awards and nominations received by films ==
Awards and nominations received by Nolan's films
Year	Title	Academy Awards		BAFTA Awards		Golden Globe Awards		Critics Choice Awards	
Year	Title	Nominations	Wins	Nominations	Wins	Nominations	Wins	Nominations	Wins
2001	Memento	2				1		2	1
2005	Batman Begins	1		3					
2006	The Prestige	2							
2008	The Dark Knight	8	2	9	1	1	1	6	2
2010	Inception	8	4	9	3	4		10	6
2012	The Dark Knight Rises			1				4	
2014	Interstellar	5	1	4	1	1		7	1
2017	Dunkirk	8	3	8	1	3		8	1
2020	Tenet	2	1	1	1	1		5	1
2023	Oppenheimer	13	7	13	7	8	5	13	8
Total		49	18	48	14	19	6	55	20

== Directed Academy Award performances ==
Under Nolan's direction, these actors have received Academy Award wins and nominations for their performances in their respective roles.

Year	Performer	Film	Result
Academy Award for Best Actor
2023	Cillian Murphy	Oppenheimer	Won
Academy Award for Best Supporting Actor
2008	Heath Ledger (Note: Posthumous award)	The Dark Knight	Won
2023	Robert Downey Jr.	Oppenheimer	Won
Academy Award for Best Supporting Actress
2023	Emily Blunt	Oppenheimer	Nominated

== See also ==
- List of accolades received by The Dark Knight
- List of accolades received by Inception
- List of accolades received by Interstellar
- List of accolades received by Dunkirk
- List of accolades received by Oppenheimer (film)
