= List of accolades received by Tenet =

Tenet accolades
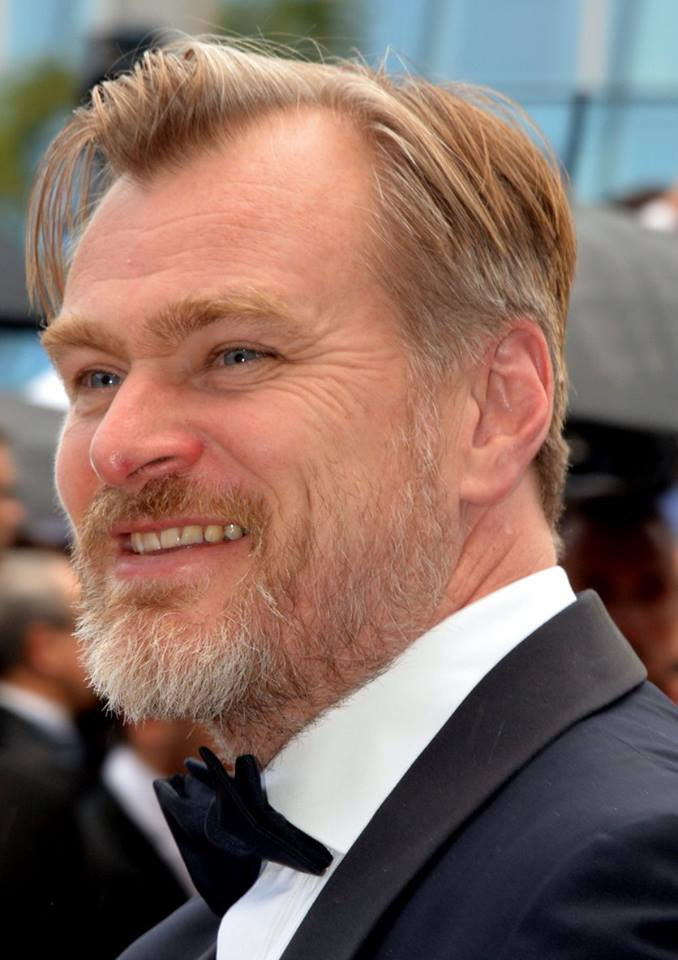
- Christopher Nolan received several accolades for his direction and screenplay.
Awards and nominations
| Award | Wins | Nominations |
| Academy Awards | 1 | 2 |
| Alliance of Women Film Journalists | 1 | 1 |
| Art Directors Guild Awards | 1 | 1 |
| Austin Film Critics Association Awards | 0 | 5 |
| Black Reel Awards | 0 | 2 |
| BMI Film & TV Awards | 1 | 1 |
| British Academy Film Awards | 1 | 1 |
| British Film Designers Guild | 1 | 1 |
| Chicago Film Critics Association Awards | 0 | 3 |
| Chinese American Film Festival | 1 | 1 |
| Critics' Choice Movie Awards | 1 | 5 |
| Critics' Choice Super Awards | 0 | 2 |
| Detroit Film Critics Society Awards | 0 | 1 |
| Dragon Awards | 0 | 1 |
| Florida Film Critics Circle Awards | 2 | 3 |
| Georgia Film Critics Association Awards | 0 | 3 |
| Golden Globe Awards | 0 | 1 |
| Golden Reel Awards | 1 | 2 |
| Golden Trailer Awards | 0 | 2 |
| Hochi Film Awards | 1 | 1 |
| Hollywood Critics Association Awards | 0 | 5 |
| Hollywood Music in Media Awards | 1 | 2 |
| Houston Film Critics Society | 2 | 4 |
| Huading Awards | 1 | 2 |
| Hugo Awards | 0 | 1 |
| International Cinephile Society Awards | 0 | 1 |
| International Film Music Critics Association Awards | 0 | 1 |
| Japan Academy Film Prize | 0 | 1 |
| Location Managers Guild Awards | 1 | 2 |
| London Film Critics' Circle Awards | 0 | 1 |
| Nikkan Sports Film Awards | 0 | 1 |
| People's Choice Awards | 0 | 2 |
| New York Film Critics Online | 3 | 3 |
| Online Film Critics Society Awards | 4 | 4 |
| San Diego Film Critics Society Awards | 1 | 4 |
| San Francisco Bay Area Film Critics Circle Awards | 0 | 3 |
| Satellite Awards | 1 | 5 |
| Saturn Awards | 3 | 8 |
| Seattle Film Critics Society Awards | 2 | 5 |
| Set Decorators Society of America Awards | 1 | 1 |
| Society of Composers & Lyricists | 0 | 1 |
| St. Louis Film Critics Association Awards | 2 | 3 |
| Visual Effects Society Awards | 0 | 1 |
| Washington D.C. Area Film Critics Association Awards | 1 | 4 |
| Webby Awards | 0 | 1 |

Totals (Note: Certain award groups do not simply award one winner. They acknowledge several different recipients, have runners-up, and have third place. Since this is a specific recognition and is different from losing an award, runner-up mentions are considered wins in this award tally. For simplification and to avoid errors, each award in this list has been presumed to have had a prior nomination.)
- Wins: 46
- Nominations: 129

Tenet is a 2020 science fiction spy film written and directed by Christopher Nolan, who also co-produced the film with Emma Thomas, under Syncopy Inc. A co-production between the United Kingdom and the United States, it stars John David Washington, Robert Pattinson, Elizabeth Debicki, Dimple Kapadia, Michael Caine, and Kenneth Branagh. The film follows a CIA agent who learns how to manipulate the flow of time to prevent an attack from the future that threatens to annihilate the present world.

Distributed by Warner Bros., Tenet was released in the United Kingdom on August 26, 2020 and in the United States on September 3, after being delayed three times because of the COVID-19 pandemic. It was the first Hollywood tent-pole to open in theaters after the pandemic shutdown, and grossed $363 million worldwide, making it the fifth-highest-grossing film of 2020. The film received generally positive reviews from critics, who praised its ambition, direction, score, visual effects, action sequences, and Washington, Debicki and Pattinson's performances, but criticized its story, and sound mixing.

Among its numerous awards and nominations, the film was nominated for Best Production Design and Best Visual Effects at the 93rd Academy Awards, winning the latter. It won the BAFTA Award for Best Special Visual Effects at the 74th British Academy Film Awards, and received nominations for five Critics' Choice Awards (winning one), a Golden Globe Award, five Satellite Awards (winning one), nine Saturn Awards (winning one), and one Hugo Award nomination.

== Accolades ==
Accolades received by Tenet
| Award | Date of ceremony | Category | Recipient(s) | Result | Ref. |
|---|---|---|---|---|---|
| Academy Awards | April 25, 2021 | Best Production Design | Nathan Crowley and Kathy Lucas | Nominated | |
| Academy Awards | April 25, 2021 | Best Visual Effects | Andrew Jackson, David Lee, Andrew Lockley, and Scott Fisher | Won | |
| Alliance of Women Film Journalists | January 4, 2021 | Most Egregious Lovers' Age Difference Award | Elizabeth Debicki and Kenneth Branagh | Won | |
| Art Directors Guild Awards | April 10, 2021 | Excellence in Production Design for a Fantasy Film | Nathan Crowley | Won | |
| Austin Film Critics Association Awards | March 19, 2021 | Best Cinematography | Hoyte van Hoytema | Nominated | |
| Austin Film Critics Association Awards | March 19, 2021 | Best Score | Ludwig Göransson | Nominated | |
| Austin Film Critics Association Awards | March 19, 2021 | Best Film Editing | Jennifer Lame | Nominated | |
| Austin Film Critics Association Awards | March 19, 2021 | Best Motion Capture/Special Effects Performance | Andrew Jackson | Nominated | |
| Austin Film Critics Association Awards | March 19, 2021 | Best Stunts | Tenet | Nominated | |
| Black Reel Awards | April 11, 2021 | Outstanding Cinematography | Hoyte van Hoytema | Nominated | |
| Black Reel Awards | April 11, 2021 | Outstanding Production Design | Nathan Crowley | Nominated | |
| BMI Film & TV Awards | July 12, 2021 | Theatrical Film Award | Ludwig Göransson | Won | |
| British Academy Film Awards | April 11, 2021 | Best Special Visual Effects | Scott Fisher, Andrew Jackson, and Andrew Lockley | Won | |
| British Film Designers Guild | May 19, 2021 | Best Production Design International Studio Feature Film – Fantasy | Nathan Crowley, Kathy Lucas, Toby Britton, Eggert Ketilsson, Jenne Lee, Emmanuel Delis and Anna Pinnock | Won | |
| Chicago Film Critics Association | December 21, 2020 | Best Original Score | Ludwig Göransson | Nominated | |
| Chicago Film Critics Association | December 21, 2020 | Best Editing | Jennifer Lame | Nominated | |
| Chicago Film Critics Association | December 21, 2020 | Best Use of Visual Effects | Tenet | Nominated | |
| Critics' Choice Movie Awards | March 7, 2021 | Best Cinematography | Hoyte van Hoytema | Nominated | |
| Critics' Choice Movie Awards | March 7, 2021 | Best Editing | Jennifer Lame | Nominated | |
| Critics' Choice Movie Awards | March 7, 2021 | Best Production Design | Nathan Crowley and Kathy Lucas | Nominated | |
| Critics' Choice Movie Awards | March 7, 2021 | Best Score | Ludwig Göransson | Nominated | |
| Critics' Choice Movie Awards | March 7, 2021 | Best Visual Effects | Tenet | Won | |
| Critics' Choice Super Awards | January 10, 2021 | Best Action Movie | Tenet | Nominated | |
| Critics' Choice Super Awards | January 10, 2021 | Best Actor in an Action Movie | John David Washington | Nominated | |
| Chinese American Film Festival | November 9, 2020 | Golden Angel Award for Most Popular U.S. Film in China | Tenet | Won | |
| Detroit Film Critics Society Awards | February 28, 2021 | Best Use of Music | Tenet | Nominated | |
| Dragon Awards | September 7, 2021 | Best Science Fiction or Fantasy Movie | Tenet | Nominated | |
| Florida Film Critics Circle Awards | December 21, 2020 | Best Cinematography | Hoyte van Hoytema | Nominated | |
| Florida Film Critics Circle Awards | December 21, 2020 | Best Score | Ludwig Göransson | Runner-up | |
| Florida Film Critics Circle Awards | December 21, 2020 | Best Visual Effects | Andrew Jackson | Runner-up | |
| Georgia Film Critics Association Awards | March 12, 2021 | Best Cinematography | Hoyte van Hoytema | Nominated | |
| Georgia Film Critics Association Awards | March 12, 2021 | Best Original Score | Ludwig Göransson | Nominated | |
| Georgia Film Critics Association Awards | March 12, 2021 | Best Production Design | Nathan Crowley, Rory Bruen, Steve Christensen, Eggert Ketilsson, Jenne Lee, Justin O’Neal Miller, Benjamin Nowicki, Erik Osusky, and Anthony D. Parrillo | Nominated | |
| Golden Globe Awards | February 28, 2021 | Best Original Score | Ludwig Göransson | Nominated | |
| Golden Reel Awards | April 16, 2021 | Outstanding Achievement in Sound Editing – Sound Effects and Foley for Feature Film | Richard King, Michael W. Mitchell, Joseph Fraioli, Mark Larry, Bruce Tanis, Angela Ang, John Cucci, Catherine Harper, John Roesch, Katie Rose, Alyson Dee Moore, Chris Moriana, Shelley Roden, Dan O'Connell, and John Cucci | Nominated | |
| Golden Reel Awards | April 16, 2021 | Outstanding Achievement in Sound Editing – Feature Underscore | Alex Gibson and Nicholas Fitzgerald | Won | |
| Golden Trailer Awards | July 22, 2021 | Best Action Poster | Warner Bros. and Leroy & Rose (for "IMAX Art") | Nominated | |
| Golden Trailer Awards | July 22, 2021 | Best Action/Thriller TrailerByte for a Feature Film | Warner Bros. and Trailer Park Group (for "Explosive Wait") | Nominated | |
| Hochi Film Awards | December 2, 2020 | Best Foreign Language Film | Tenet | Won | |
| Hollywood Critics Association Awards | March 5, 2021 | Best Action Film | Tenet | Nominated | |
| Hollywood Critics Association Awards | March 5, 2021 | Best Blockbuster Film | Tenet | Nominated | |
| Hollywood Critics Association Awards | March 5, 2021 | Best Cinematography | Hoyte van Hoytema | Nominated | |
| Hollywood Critics Association Awards | March 5, 2021 | Best Visual Effects | Andrew Jackson | Nominated | |
| Hollywood Critics Association Awards | March 5, 2021 | Best Stunt Work | Tenet | Nominated | |
| Hollywood Music in Media Awards | January 27, 2021 | Best Original Score in a Sci-Fi/Fantasy Film | Ludwig Göransson | Won | |
| Hollywood Music in Media Awards | January 27, 2021 | Best Original Song in a Feature Film | "The Plan" – Jacques Webster II, Ebony Naomi Oshunrinde, and Ludwig Göransson | Nominated | |
| Houston Film Critics Society | January 18, 2021 | Best Cinematography | Hoyte van Hoytema | Nominated | |
| Houston Film Critics Society | January 18, 2021 | Best Visual Effects | Tenet | Won | |
| Houston Film Critics Society | January 18, 2021 | Best Stunt Coordination Team | Tenet | Won | |
| Houston Film Critics Society | January 18, 2021 | Best Original Score | Ludwig Göransson | Nominated | |
| Huading Awards | January 10, 2021 | Best Global Motion Picture | Tenet | Won | |
| Huading Awards | January 10, 2021 | Best Global Director for a Motion Picture | Christopher Nolan | Nominated | |
| Hugo Awards | January 19, 2021 | Best Dramatic Presentation, Long Form | Christopher Nolan | Nominated | |
| International Cinephile Society Awards | February 20, 2021 | Best Sound Design | Willie D. Burton, Richard King, Kevin O'Connell and Gary A. Rizzo | Nominated | |
| International Film Music Critics Association Awards | February 18, 2021 | Best Original Score for an Action/Adventure/Thriller Film | Ludwig Göransson | Nominated | |
| Japan Academy Film Prize | March 19, 2021 | Outstanding Foreign Language Film | Tenet | Nominated | |
| Location Managers Guild Awards | October 23, 2021 | Outstanding Locations in a Contemporary Film | Janice Polley, Julie Hannum and Klaus Darrelmann | Won | |
| Location Managers Guild Awards | October 23, 2021 | Outstanding Film Commission | Estonian Film Institute | Nominated | |
| London Film Critics' Circle Awards | February 7, 2021 | Technical Achievement Award | Jennifer Lame (film editing) | Nominated | |
| Nikkan Sports Film Awards | December 28, 2020 | Best Foreign Film | Tenet | Nominated | |
| Online Film Critics Society | January 25, 2021 | Best Editing | Jennifer Lame | Nominated | |
| Online Film Critics Society | January 25, 2021 | Best Cinematography | Hoyte van Hoytema | Nominated | |
| Online Film Critics Society | January 25, 2021 | Best Original Score | Ludwig Göransson | Nominated | |
| Online Film Critics Society | January 25, 2021 | Technical Achievement Awards – Visual Effects | Tenet | Won | |
| People's Choice Awards | November 15, 2020 | The Action Movie of 2020 | Tenet | Nominated | |
| People's Choice Awards | November 15, 2020 | The Action Movie Star of 2020 | John David Washington | Nominated | |
| San Diego Film Critics Society Awards | January 11, 2021 | Best Cinematography | Hoyte van Hoytema | Nominated | |
| San Diego Film Critics Society Awards | January 11, 2021 | Best Editing | Jennifer Lame | Nominated | |
| San Diego Film Critics Society Awards | January 11, 2021 | Best Production Design | Nathan Crowley | Nominated | |
| San Diego Film Critics Society Awards | January 11, 2021 | Best Visual Effects | Tenet | Won | |
| San Francisco Bay Area Film Critics Circle Awards | January 18, 2021 | Best Cinematography | Hoyte van Hoytema | Nominated | |
| San Francisco Bay Area Film Critics Circle Awards | January 18, 2021 | Best Film Editing | Jennifer Lame | Nominated | |
| San Francisco Bay Area Film Critics Circle Awards | January 18, 2021 | Best Production Design | Nathan Crowley and Kathy Lucas | Nominated | |
| Satellite Awards | February 15, 2021 | Best Motion Picture – Drama | Tenet | Nominated | |
| Satellite Awards | February 15, 2021 | Best Cinematography | Hoyte van Hoytema | Nominated | |
| Satellite Awards | February 15, 2021 | Best Original Score | Ludwig Göransson | Nominated | |
| Satellite Awards | February 15, 2021 | Best Sound (Editing and Mixing) | Willie D. Burton, Richard King, Kevin O'Connell, and Gary A. Rizzo | Nominated | |
| Satellite Awards | February 15, 2021 | Best Visual Effects | Andrew Jackson and Scott R. Fisher | Won | |
| Saturn Awards | October 26, 2021 | Best Science Fiction Film | Tenet | Nominated | |
| Saturn Awards | October 26, 2021 | Best Director | Christopher Nolan | Nominated | |
| Saturn Awards | October 26, 2021 | Best Writing | Christopher Nolan | Nominated | |
| Saturn Awards | October 26, 2021 | Best Actor | John David Washington | Won | |
| Saturn Awards | October 26, 2021 | Best Supporting Actor | Robert Pattinson | Nominated | |
| Saturn Awards | October 26, 2021 | Best Editing | Jennifer Lame | Nominated | |
| Saturn Awards | October 26, 2021 | Best Music | Ludwig Göransson | Nominated | |
| Saturn Awards | October 26, 2021 | Best Production Design | Nathan Crowley | Nominated | |
| Saturn Awards | October 26, 2021 | Best Special / Visual Effects | Andrew Jackson, Andrew Lockley, Scott Fisher, and Mike Chambers | Nominated | |
| Seattle Film Critics Society Awards | February 15, 2021 | Best Film Editing | Jennifer Lame | Nominated | |
| Seattle Film Critics Society Awards | February 15, 2021 | Best Production Design | Nathan Crowley and Kathy Lucas | Nominated | |
| Seattle Film Critics Society Awards | February 15, 2021 | Best Original Score | Ludwig Göransson | Nominated | |
| Seattle Film Critics Society Awards | February 15, 2021 | Best Action Choreography | Tenet | Won | |
| Seattle Film Critics Society Awards | February 15, 2021 | Best Visual Effects | Andrew Jackson, Andrew Lockley, Scott Fisher, and Mike Chambers | Won | |
| Set Decorators Society of America Awards | March 31, 2021 | Best Achievement in Décor/Design of a Science Fiction or Fantasy Feature Film | Kathy Lucas and Nathan Crowley | Won | |
| Society of Composers & Lyricists | March 1, 2021 | Outstanding Original Score for a Studio Film | Ludwig Göransson | Nominated | |
| St. Louis Film Critics Association Awards | January 18, 2021 | Best Action Film | Tenet | Won | |
| St. Louis Film Critics Association Awards | January 18, 2021 | Best Visual Effects | Tenet | Won | |
| St. Louis Film Critics Association Awards | January 18, 2021 | Best Score | Ludwig Göransson | Nominated | |
| Visual Effects Society Awards | April 6, 2021 | Outstanding Visual Effects in a Photoreal Feature | Andrew Jackson, Mike Chambers, Andrew Lockley, David Lee, and Scott Fisher | Nominated | |
| Washington D.C. Area Film Critics Association | February 8, 2021 | Best Cinematography | Hoyte van Hoytema | Nominated | |
| Washington D.C. Area Film Critics Association | February 8, 2021 | Best Score | Ludwig Göransson | Nominated | |
| Washington D.C. Area Film Critics Association | February 8, 2021 | Best Editing | Jennifer Lame | Won | |
| Washington D.C. Area Film Critics Association | February 8, 2021 | Best Production Design | Nathan Crowley and Kathy Lucas | Nominated | |
| Webby Awards | May 18, 2021 | Social – Television/Film | Warner Bros. and Movers+Shakers (for "#TimeforTenet TikTok Challenge") | Nominated | |

== Sources ==
- Mottram, James (2020). The Secrets of Tenet: Inside Christopher Nolan's Quantum Cold War. Insight Editions. ISBN 978-1-64722-060-0.
