= Bill Camp on screen and stage =

American actor

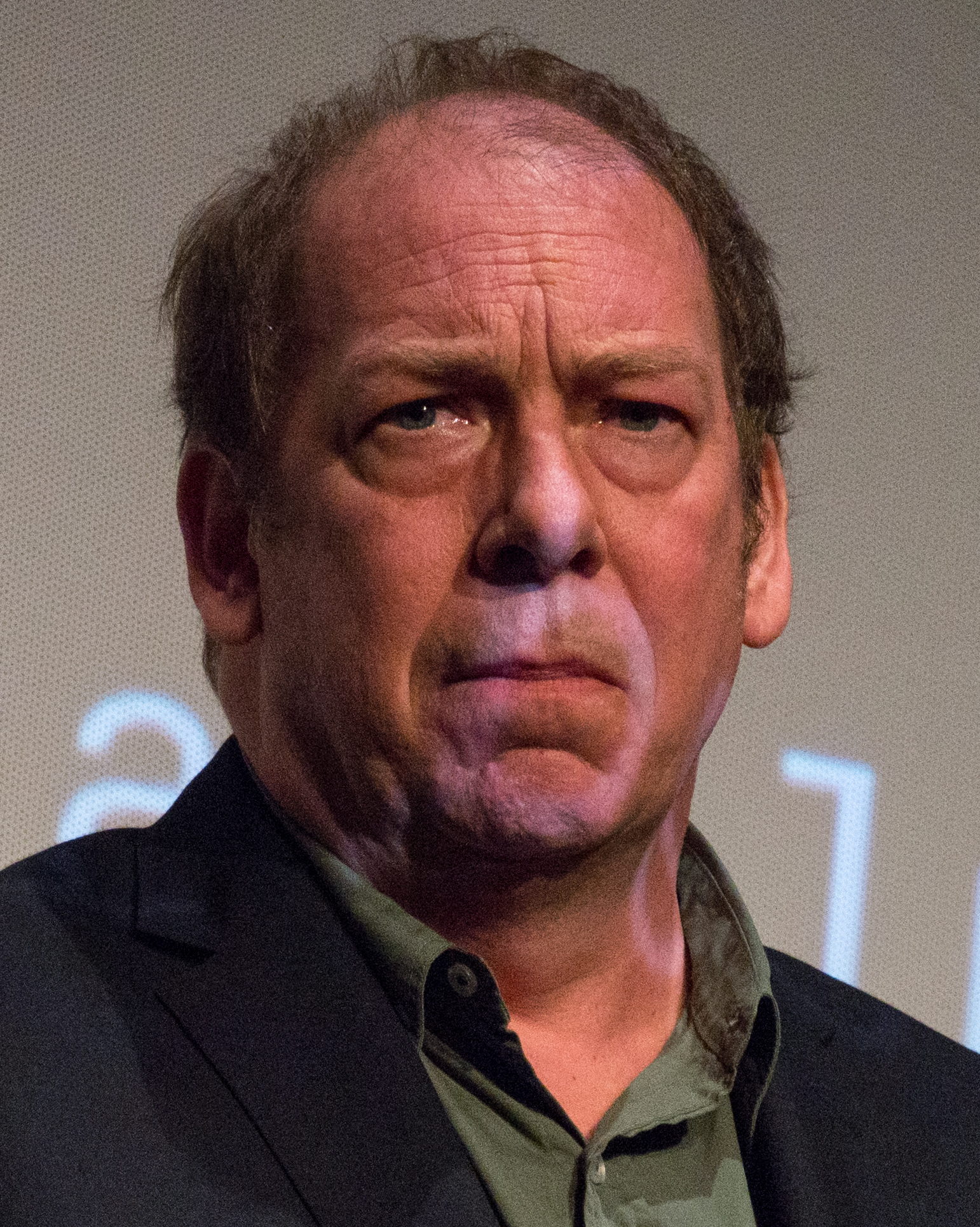
Bill Camp at the 2018 Tribeca Film Festival

Bill Camp is an American actor of the stage and screen. He is known for his extensive character actor roles since 1989 acting in a revival of William Shakespeare's romance Twelfth Night at the Public Theater. He made his film acting debut in the legal thriller Reversal of Fortune (1990).

Camp continued to take roles in films such as the drama Rounders (1998), the crime drama Public Enemies (2009), the independent drama Compliance (2012), the prohibition drama Lawless (2012), the historical drama Lincoln (2012), the historical drama 12 Years a Slave (2013), the musical drama Love & Mercy (2015), the drama Black Mass (2015), the historical drama Loving (2016), the action film Jason Bourne (2016), the psychological drama The Killing of a Sacred Deer (2017), the crime thriller Molly's Game (2017), the drama Wildlife (2018), the political satire Vice (2018), the superhero film Joker (2019), the western News of the World (2020), and the drama Passing (2021).

On television, he started his career with recurring roles in the NBC police procedural series Law & Order (1999–2004), the FX legal drama Damages (2006), the drama series Manhattan (2014–2015), and the HBO supernatural drama series The Leftovers (2015–2017). For his role as a Detective Sergeant in the HBO crime drama miniseries The Night Of (2016), he was nominated for the Primetime Emmy Award. He played a custodian and chess mentor in the Netflix period drama miniseries The Queen's Gambit (2020) he was nominated for the Screen Actors Guild Award.

Recently he had recurring roles in the Hulu miniseries The Looming Tower (2018), the HBO horror-crime series The Outsider (2020), the Netflix legal drama miniseries A Man in Full (2024), the Apple TV+ legal drama series Presumed Innocent (2024), the Netflix political miniseries Zero Day (2025), and the Netflix melodrama miniseries Sirens (2025). In 2025 he portrayed J. P. Morgan in the HBO period drama series The Gilded Age.

== Film ==
Key
†	Denotes films that have not yet been released

Year	Title	Role	Director	Notes
1990	Reversal of Fortune	Bill	Barbet Schroeder	
1997	In & Out	Bachelor Party Guest	Frank Oz	
1998	Rounders	Eisenberg	John Dahl	
2005	The Dying Gaul	Malcolm	Craig Lucas	
2007	Reservation Road	Desk Cop	Terry George	
2008	The Guitar	Pa Wilder	Amy Redford	
2008	Deception	Clancey Controller	Marcel Langenegger	
2009	Public Enemies	Frank Nitti	Michael Mann	
2010	Tamara Drewe	Glen McGreavey	Stephen Frears	
2012	Compliance	Van	Craig Zobel	
2012	Lawless	Sheriff Hodges	John Hillcoat	
2012	Lincoln	Mr. Jolly	Steven Spielberg	
2013	12 Years a Slave	Radburn	Steve McQueen	
2013	The Maid's Room	Mr. Crawford	Michael Walker	
2014	Birdman or (The Unexpected Virtue of Ignorance)	Crazy Man	Alejandro G. Iñárritu	
2014	Love & Mercy	Murry Wilson	Bill Pohlad	
2015	Aloha	Bob Largent	Cameron Crowe	
2015	Black Mass	John Callahan	Scott Cooper	
2016	Midnight Special	Doak	Jeff Nichols	
2016	Loving	Frank Beazley	Jeff Nichols	
2016	Jason Bourne	Malcolm Smith	Paul Greengrass	
2016	Gold	Hollis Dresher	Stephen Gaghan	
2017	Crown Heights	William Robedee	Matt Ruskin	
2017	The Killing of a Sacred Deer	Matthew Williams	Yorgos Lanthimos	
2017	The Only Living Boy in New York	Uncle Buster	Marc Webb	
2017	Hostiles	Jeremiah Wilks	Scott Cooper	
2017	Molly's Game	Harlan Eustice	Aaron Sorkin	
2017	Woman Walks Ahead	General Crook	Susanna White	
2018	Wildlife	Warren Miller	Paul Dano	
2018	Red Sparrow	Marty Gable	Francis Lawrence	
2018	Skin	Fred "Hammer" Krager	Guy Nattiv	
2018	The Land of Steady Habits	Donny O'Connell	Nicole Holofcener	
2018	Vice	Gerald Ford	Adam McKay	
2019	Native Son	Henry Dalton	Rashid Johnson	
2019	The Kitchen	Alfonso Coretti	Andrea Berloff	
2019	Joker	Detective Garrity	Todd Phillips	
2019	Dark Waters	Wilbur Tennant	Todd Haynes	
2020	News of the World	Willie Branholme	Paul Greengrass	
2021	Passing	Hugh Wentworth	Rebecca Hall	
2021	With/In: Volume 2		Himself; Elizabeth Marvel	Segment: "In the Air"; Also writer and director
2022	White Noise	Man With TV	Noah Baumbach	
2023	Boston Strangler	Commissioner Edmund McNamara	Matt Ruskin	
2023	Sound of Freedom	Vampiro	Alejandro Gómez Monteverde	
2023	The Burial	Raymond Loewen	Maggie Betts	
2024	Drive-Away Dolls	Curlie	Ethan Coen	
2024	'Salem's Lot	Matthew Burke	Gary Dauberman	
2024	Transplant	Dr. Edward Harmon	Jason Park	
2025	The Mastermind	Bill Mooney	Kelly Reichardt	
2025	Honey Don't!	Drive-Thru Customer	Ethan Coen	
2026	Run Amok	Mr Hunt	NB Mager	
2026	How to Make a Killing	Warren Redfellow	John Patton Ford	
2026	Ponderosa	George	Rob Rice	
2026	Matchbox: The Movie	Smalley	Sam Hargrave	
2027	Karoshi †		Takashi Doscher	Post-production
2027	Judgment Day †		Nicholas Stoller	Post-production
2027	Operation Fastlink †		Jerry Careccio	Post-production
2027	Rode to Ruin †		Michael Keaton	Filming
TBA	Preppy †		Janicza Bravo	Filming

== Television ==
Year	Title	Role	Notes
1990	Great Performances	Marcellus / Sailor / Player	Episode: "Hamlet"
1994	New York Undercover	Bronski	Episode: "Pilot"
1995	New York News	Performer	Episode: "Past Imperfect"
1999–2004	Law & Order	Denny Rogis / Barney Rade	2 episodes
2000	The Great Gatsby	Wilson	TV movie
2003	Joan of Arcadia	Painter God	Episode: "St. Joan"
2005	Law & Order: Criminal Intent	Mickey	Episode: "Acts of Contrition"
2008	Brotherhood	Agent Jarvis	3 episodes
2011	Boardwalk Empire	Glenmore	Episode: "Gimcrack & Bunkum"
2011	The Good Wife	Daniel Clove	Episode: "Parenting Made Easy"
2012	Damages	Samurai Seven/Hacker	6 episodes
2014–15	Manhattan	William Hogarth	5 episodes
2015–17	The Leftovers	David Burton	4 episodes
2016	The Night Of	Dennis Box	Miniseries, 8 episodes
2018	The Looming Tower	Robert Chesney	Miniseries, 8 episodes
2018	The First	Aaron Shultz	Episode: "Collisions"
2020	Forensic Files II	Narrator	Succeeding Peter Thomas
2020	Monsterland	Stan	Episode: "New York, New York"
2020	The Queen's Gambit	Mr. Shaibel	Miniseries, 4 episodes
2020	The Outsider	Howard Salomon	Miniseries, 10 episodes
2021	American Rust	Henry English	Main role, 9 episodes
2024	A Man in Full	Harry Zane	Miniseries, 6 episodes
2024	Presumed Innocent	Raymond Horgan	8 episodes
2025	Zero Day	Director Jeremy Lasch	Miniseries, 5 episodes
2025	Sirens	Bruce DeWitt	Miniseries, 5 episodes
2025	The Gilded Age	J. P. Morgan	3 episodes
2025	The American Revolution	Capt. Jabez Fitch (voice)	Episode: "The Times That Try Men's Souls (July 1776 - January 1777)"
2026	Rick and Morty	Announcer, Sergeant Marlowe (voices)	Episode: "Rickuiem Mort a Dream"
2026	Nocturne	Chief Ellison	Upcoming series

== Theatre ==
Year	Title	Role	Venue	Ref.
1989	Twelfth Night, or What You Will	Walter	Delacorte Theatre, Off-Broadway	
1989	Titus Andronicus	Chiron	Delacorte Theatre, Off-Broadway	
1990	Hamlet	Marcellus/Lord/Sailor	The Public Theater, Off-Broadway	
1991	Light Shining in Buckinghamshire	Performer	Perry Street Theatre, Off-Broadway	
1992	The Seagull	Konstantin Treplev (understudy)	Lyceum Theatre, Broadway	
1993	Saint Joan	Gilles de Rais	Lyceum Theatre, Broadway	
1995	Troilus and Cressida	Paris	Delacorte Theatre, Off-Broadway	
1996	Measure for Measure	Duke	Theatre at St. Clement's, Off-Broadway	
1997	One Flea Spare	Bunce	The Public Theater, Off-Broadway	
1997	The Devils	Performer	New York Theatre Workshop, Off-Broadway	
1997–98	Jackie	Various	Belasco Theatre, Broadway	
2000	Lydie Breeze, Parts I & II	Joshua Hickman	New York Theatre Workshop, Off-Broadway	
2001	Homebody/Kabul	Quango Twistleton	New York Theatre Workshop, Off-Broadway	
2006	Soar Throats	Jack	Duke on 42nd Street, Off-Broadway	
2006	Heartbreak House	Boss Mangan	American Airlines Theatre, Broadway Revival	
2007	Coram Boy	Otis Gardner	Imperial Theatre, Broadway	
2007	The Misanthrope	Alceste	New York Theatre Workshop, Off-Broadway	
2007	4 Beckett Shorts	Performer	New York Theatre Workshop, Off-Broadway	
2009	Still Life	Voice	Lucille Lortel Theatre, Off-Broadway	
2011	The Intelligent Homosexual's Guide	Adam	The Newman Theatre, Off-Broadway	
2012	Death of a Salesman	Charley	Ethel Barrymore Theatre, Broadway	
2016	The Crucible	Reverend John Hale	Walter Kerr Theatre, Broadway	
2022	Long Day's Journey into Night	James Tyrone Sr.	Minetta Lane Theatre, Off-Broadway	
