= The Legend of Juan Jose Mundo =

- Directed by: Michael Walker
- Written by: Susan Gomes, Michael Walker
- Produced by: Alfred Sapse, Michael Goodin
- Starring: Anna Mirodin; Alexandro Byrd; Hannah Kepple; Chase Vacnin
- Cinematography: Kristy Tully
- Production companies: American High; Pango Films; Call Sheet Films
- Release date: September 25, 2025
- Running time: 92 minutes
- Country: United States
- Language: English

The Legend of Juan Jose Mundo is a 2025 American teen romantic comedy film directed by Michael Walker and co-written with Susan Gomes. The film follows a high school student who becomes infatuated with a charismatic Spanish exchange student her family is hosting

== Production ==
The film is inspired by Gomes' real high school experiences growing up in White Plains, NY

The film stars Anna Mirodin, Alexandro Byrd, Hannah Kepple, and Chase Vacnin.

== Release & Reception ==
The film won the Miami Jewish Film Festival's Next Wave Jury Prize. It also won Best US Indie at Fort Lauderdale International Film Festival, Best Feature at Garden State Film Festival and many awards for its director, Michael Walker and stars, Anna Mirodin and Alexandro Byrd.

Mikkel Frederiksen with Film Threat gave the film 8/10 stars, calling it "a lighthearted addition to the teen comedy genre" that "makes you laugh and makes you thankful you're not in high school anymore."

Tim Molloy of MovieMaker praised the film's authenticity, writing: "truly feels like the '80s" and compared its tone to the works of John Hughes and other classic 1980s coming-of-age films.

The film holds a 100% approval rating on Rotten Tomatoes based on 3 critic reviews, with no average score calculation.
