= Price Check =

- Promotional poster
- Directed by: Michael Walker
- Written by: Michael Walker
- Produced by: Dolly Hall
- Starring: Parker Posey; Eric Mabius
- Cinematography: Sam Chase
- Edited by: Jennifer Lame; Michael Taylor
- Music by: Matt Kollar
- Distributed by: IFC Films (US)
- Release date: January 25, 2012 (Sundance)
- Country: United States
- Language: English

Price Check is a 2012 comedy film about the high price of a middle-class life. The film was written and directed by Michael Walker, and stars Parker Posey and Eric Mabius.

== Plot ==
Pete Cozy (Eric Mabius) lives in a house in the suburbs with a job in the pricing department of a middling supermarket chain. Pete's job allows him to spend quality time with his wife (Annie Parisse) and young son and, despite the family drowning in debt, they appear happy.

Everything changes when Pete gets a new boss, the beautiful, high-powered, fast talking Susan Felders (Parker Posey). With Susan's influence, Pete finds himself on the executive track, something that both surprises and excites him. The more his salary increases, the more he has to perform at work... and the less time he gets to spend with his family. At the same time, his relationship with his boss begins to cross the line of professional etiquette. Both become enamored with one another – creating tension in the workplace and in Pete's home life.

== Cast ==
- Parker Posey as Susan Felders
- Eric Mabius as Pete Cozy
- Annie Parisse as Sara Cozy
- Josh Pais as Doug Cain
- Edward Herrmann as Bennington
- Remy Auberjonois as Todd Kenner
- Jayce Bartok as Bobby McCain
- Samrat Chakrabarti as Eddie
- Cheyenne Jackson as Ernie
- Stephen Kunken as Cartwright
- Amy Schumer as Lila
- Matt Servitto as Jim Brady

== Reception ==
Price Check premiered at the Sundance Film Festival in 2012. It received mostly positive reviews there. The Hollywood Reporter called it "A prime example of the type of well-produced, smartly cast independent features that Sundance has been helping launch into the theatrical marketplace over the past few years.." Variety called it "charming and slightly unhinged". Reviews were also very strong for Parker Posey's performance and Michael Walker's directing. On Rotten Tomatoes the film has a 64% approval rating from critics based on 22 reviews.

The film was released in theaters by IFC Films on November 25, 2012.
