= Kathy Lucas =

American set decorator

- Occupation: Set decorator

Kathy Lucas is an American set decorator. She has been nominated for two Academy Awards in the category Best Production Design for the films First Man and Tenet.

== Selected filmography ==
- First Man (2018; co-nominated with Nathan Crowley)
- Tenet (2020; co-nominated with Nathan Crowley)
