= Chasing Sleep =

- Theatrical release poster
- Directed by: Michael Walker
- Written by: Michael Walker
- Produced by: Thomas Bidegain
- Starring: Jeff Daniels; Emily Bergl; Gil Bellows; Zach Grenier; Julian McMahon; Ben Shenkman; Molly Price; Patrick Moug
- Cinematography: Jim Denault
- Edited by: David Leonard
- Production company: Canal+
- Distributed by: Mars Distribution (France); Lions Gate Films (United States)
- Release dates: October 6, 2000 (Theatrical); September 16, 2001 (Video)
- Running time: 104 minutes
- Countries: Canada; France; United States
- Language: English

Chasing Sleep is a 2000 psychological thriller film written and directed by Michael Walker released to video in 2001. It depicts the reaction of a college professor who awakens to find his wife missing. It stars Jeff Daniels and Emily Bergl.

== Plot ==
Ed Saxon, a college English professor, wakes up to find his wife (Eve) has not returned to their Seattle home. He takes some mysterious pills then calls one of his wife's friends, Susie, confusedly asking whether or not he should be worried. Susie suggests that he call the local hospital, but they have no record of his wife being admitted. After consulting Susie again, he decides to call the police. When Detective Derm arrives he takes pills similar to Saxon's. They check Eve's workplace and listen to some messages on the answering machine. George Simian has left a message inquiring about Eve and Derm remarks that her abandoned car was found near Simian's house. Similain is also discovered to be Eve's lover. Saxon has to deal with his employers who are annoyed that he didn't show up to teach his class, which leads one of his students, Sadie, to also leave a message.

Saxon suffers a series of hallucinations and blackouts, advancing time quickly. In short time, he receives increasingly irritated calls from work, which he blows off; an abusive phone call from George Simian, followed by a physical altercation; and a visit by Sadie, concerned about his unexplained absences. Saxon declines to tell Sadie about his missing wife, instead telling her that his wife is visiting her mother. Sadie collapses in the bathroom, bloodying her nose, and complains of having heard a woman scream. Saxon explains that the neighbors, who fight often, can sometimes be heard from his house, and he gives her a change of clothes. After she leaves, Derm returns, wanting to search the house for clues. Sadie's bloody shirt is discovered by Derm, who seems satisfied with Saxon's explanation. Derm also finds a diary, which Saxon didn't know his wife kept. In it, Saxon's wife expresses mixed emotions for her husband, including pity, contempt, and fear. Despite his promise to give the diary to Derm, Saxon burns the diary.

Geoffrey Costas, a psychiatrist who leads a victim support group, visits Saxon, offering him comfort. Saxon initially declines, before soliciting stronger medication, to fight off long-term insomnia. Despite the strong medication, Saxon does not seem to fall asleep, though he suffers more blackouts and apparent hallucinations. Sadie returns to his house, concerned that he has missed more classes, but Susie interrupts them. Saxon angrily brushes aside Susie's concerns and explains that Sadie is just a student. After he gets rid of Susie, Sadie expresses her feelings of loneliness and isolation, as well as admiration for Saxon's poetry. This leads to an abortive tryst, which Saxon abruptly calls off. Humiliated and confused, Sadie leaves.

Derm calls Saxon to reveal that they've discovered his wife's body. Depressed, Saxon welcomes the chance to talk to Costas again. They discuss how traumatic events can lead to inappropriate guilt, and Costas convinces Saxon to allow him to speak to the police, on his behalf. However, the police reveal that they have not discovered the wife's body, after all, leading both Costas and Derm to suspect Saxon. Saxon has further hallucinations, leading him to suspect himself, as well. Simian, who had been arrested previously for assaulting Saxon, returns to Saxon's house again, enraged and seeking to kill Saxon. Saxon instead kills Simian, and, consumed with guilt, swallows every pill that he can find. Derm, arriving at the house afterward, kneels down, in front of Saxon, while Saxon denies killing anyone. The bathtub then overflows with blood, and Saxon sees his wife playing the piano.

== Cast ==
- Jeff Daniels as Ed Saxon
- Emily Bergl as Sadie
- Gil Bellows as Detective Derm
- Zach Grenier as Geoffrey Costas
- Julian McMahon as George Simian
- Ben Shenkman as Officer Stewart
- Molly Price as Susie
- Patrick Moug as Detective Snyder

== Themes ==
The Chicago Reader states that "Walker does pull an impressive Kubrickian trick by turning the antiseptic, deteriorating house into a metaphor for Daniels's mental state".

Addiction and denial of reality is also touched upon in the film. Ed Saxon is taking medication and his doctor, a police officer early in the film and Det. Derm are all seen taking the exact same pills.

Severe insomnia and Sleep deprivation

Guilt and denial

Unreliability of memory and percecption

Alienation and isolation

== Production ==
=== Film locations ===
- Chelsea, Michigan, United States
- Jackson, Michigan, United States
- Stockbridge, Michigan, United States

== Release ==
The film did not receive a theatrical release within the United States, although Lions Gate Films bought the rights at the Toronto Film Festival. The film instead ran on the festival circuit for a year before premiering on video on September 16, 2001, by Lions Gate. It was later self-distributed in the US, after its video release, and it played in theaters in Los Angeles, Seattle, Portland and Chicago.

=== Film festivals and other releases ===
- 2001 - Toronto International Film Festival - Official Selection
- 2001 - Amsterdam Fantastic Film Festival - Official Selection
- 2001 - Brussels International Festival of Fantasy Films - Official Selection
- 2001 - Gérardmer Film Festival - Official Selection
- 2001 - Lund Fantastisk Film Festival - Official Selection
- 2001 - Sweden Fantastic Film Festival - Official Selection

== Reception ==
On Rotten Tomatoes, the film received a rating of 50% based on reviews from 6 critics, with an average rating of 5.9.

=== Awards ===
- 2001 - Gérardmer Film Festival - Won - Special Jury Prize
- 2001 - Sweden Fantastic Film Festival - Won - Jury Grand Prize
