= Molly Price =

American actress

- Born: North Plainfield, New Jersey, U.S.
- Education: Rutgers University, New Brunswick (BFA)
- Occupation: actress
- Years active: since 1991
- Spouse: Derek Kelly (m. 2001)
- Children: 1

Molly Price is an American actress. She is best known for her role as Faith Yokas in the NBC drama series Third Watch (1999–2005). Price has also appeared in recurring and guest-starring roles in many other television dramas and co-starred in a number of films, including Sweet and Lowdown (1999), Chasing Sleep (2000), and Not Fade Away (2012). She portrays Det. Jackie Donnelly in the CBS drama series Elsbeth.

== Early life and education ==
Price was born in North Plainfield, New Jersey, and graduated from North Plainfield High School in 1984. She is a graduate of Rutgers University.

== Career ==
Price made her television debut appearing in a 1991 episode of the NBC drama Law & Order. She later had three more guest roles in Law & Order, playing different characters.

From 1995 to 1996, she was a regular cast member in the short-lived CBS sitcom Bless This House, starring Andrew Dice Clay and Cathy Moriarty. In film, she had supporting roles in Jersey Girl (1992) starring Jami Gertz and Dylan McDermott, Kiss Me, Guido (1997), Pushing Tin (1999), Woody Allen's Sweet and Lowdown (1999), Random Hearts (1999), and Chasing Sleep (2000) opposite Jeff Daniels.

In 1999, Price was cast as Police Officer (and later, Detective) Faith Yokas in the NBC crime drama series Third Watch, which she starred in from 1999 to 2005. Her husband was a recurring guest star on Third Watch as an FDNY firefighter, and she described her experiences as a firefighter's wife during the show's special 9/11 episode, entitled "In Their Own Words." She also appeared in two episodes of Sex and the City as Carrie Bradshaw's friend Susan Sharon, in 1999 and 2002, and reprised the role in an episode of the reboot And Just Like That..., in 2021. After Third Watch, Price starred in NBC's short-lived 2007 reboot of the 1970s series Bionic Woman, playing Ruth Treadwell.

Price has appeared in a number of television dramas playing guest starring roles, including Studio 60 on the Sunset Strip, Without a Trace as agent Samantha Spade's sister, ER, The Mentalist, Private Practice, Nip/Tuck, Body of Proof, Person of Interest, Shameless, Elementary, The Good Wife, Elsbeth, and Law & Order: Special Victims Unit. From 2014 to 2015, Price had a recurring role in the Cinemax drama series The Knick, as Effie Barrow. In 2015, she co-starred in the short-lived Showtime comedy-drama Happyish. In film, Price played Uma Thurman's mother in The Life Before Her Eyes (2007) as well as co-starred in What Goes Up (2009), How Do You Know (2010), The Good Doctor (2011), and Not Fade Away (2012). In 2017, she appeared in the FX drama Feud as Robert Aldrich's wife Harriet Foster. In 2017, she played the criminal defense attorney of Eric O'Bannon (Jamie McShane) in season 3 of the Netflix original drama series, Bloodline.

== Personal life ==
Price is married to New York City Fire Department firefighter Derek Kelly.

== Filmography ==
=== Film ===
Year	Title	Role	Notes
1992	Jersey Girl	Cookie	
1993	Risk	Nikki	
1997	Ties to Rachel	Leah	
1997	Kiss Me, Guido	Meryl	
1999	Pushing Tin	Crystal Plotkin	
1999	Sweet and Lowdown	Ann	
1999	Random Hearts	Alice Beaufort	
2000	Chasing Sleep	Susie	
2001	The Sleepy Time Gal	Rebecca's Colleague	
2001	Just Visiting	Teacher	
2007	The Life Before Her Eyes	Diana's Mother	
2009	What Goes Up	Donna Arbetter	
2010	How Do You Know	Coach Sally	
2011	The Good Doctor	Mrs. Nixon	
2012	Not Fade Away	Antoinette Damiano	
2013	The Devil You Know	Edie Fontaine	
2014	God's Pocket	Joanie	
2024	Babygirl	Mrs. Holbrook	
2025	The History of Sound	Lionel's Mother	
2025	Roofman	Officer Scheimreif	

=== Television ===
Year	Title	Role	Notes
1991–2006	Law & Order	Amy Newhouse / Det. Nancy Jones / Quartermaster Stroud / Allison Ashburn	4 episodes
1994	The Counterfeit Contessa	Margo	TV movie
1994	Roseanne	Michelle	Episode: "The Parenting Trap"
1995	The Shamrock Conspiracy	unknown role	TV movie
1995	Bless This House	Phyllis	Series regular (13 episodes)
1997	Dellaventura	Natalie Webb	Episode: "The Biggest Miracle"
1998	Saint Maybe	Clara	TV movie
1999	Trinity	unknown role	Episode: "Having Trouble with the Language"
1999, 2002	Sex and the City	Susan Sharon	2 episodes
1999–2005	Third Watch	Faith Yokas	Series regular (131 episodes)
2002	ER	Faith Yokas	Episode: "Brothers and Sisters"
2005	Medical Investigation	Faith Yokas	Episode: "Half Life"
2007	Studio 60 on the Sunset Strip	Nona Pruitt	Episode: "The Harriet Dinner: Part II"
2007	Without a Trace	Emily Reynolds	2 episodes
2007	Bionic Woman	Ruth Truewell	9 episodes
2008	ER	Mrs. O'Fallon	Episode: "Parental Guidance"
2009	Eleventh Hour	Dr. Elizabeth Hansen	Episode: "Electro"
2009	Lie to Me	Deputy Director Messeler	Episode: "Sacrifice"
2009	The Mentalist	Felicia Guthrie	Episode: "Red Menace"
2010	Private Practice	Andrea	Episode: "Another Second Chance"
2010	Nip/Tuck	Dahlia Mark	Episode: "Dr. Griffin"
2011	Body of Proof	Jen Russell	Episode: "All in the Family"
2011	Person of Interest	Elizabeth Whitaker	Episode: "Ghosts"
2012	Shameless	Dottie Corones	2 episodes
2012	Blue Bloods	Hollie Rivano	Episode: "The Job"
2012	Elementary	Donna Kaplan	Episode: "The Rat Race"
2013	Deception	unknown role	2 episodes
2013	The Good Wife	Lena Cesca	Episode: "Everything Is Ending"
2013	White Collar	NYPD Negotiator on rooftop	Episode: "At What Price"
2014	Irreversible	Rose	TV movie
2014–2015	The Knick	Effie Barrow	8 episodes
2015	Law & Order: Special Victims Unit	Donna Marshall	Episode: "Parole Violations"
2015	The Slap	Fiona	2 episodes
2015	Happyish	Bella	6 episodes
2016	The Blacklist	Mariana Vacarro	Episode: "Alistair Pitt (No. 103)"
2016	Madam Secretary	Mimi Jacobs	Episode: "Hijriyyah"
2016	Bates Motel	Detective Chambers	Episode: "Norman"
2017	Feud	Harriet Aldrich	3 episodes
2017	The Path	Libby Dukan / Liby Dekaan	4 episodes
2017	Bloodline	Mia	3 episodes
2018	American Crime Story	Escort Agency Manager	Episode: "Ascent"
2018	The Good Cop	Captain	2 episodes
2018–2019	Queen America	Katie Ellis	9 episodes
2019–2020	Almost Family	Judge	5 episodes
2021	And Just Like That...	Susan Sharon	Episode: "Little Black Dress"
2024–2026	Elsbeth	Detective Jackie Donnelly	Recurring role, 10 episodes
2025	Will Trent	Didi Polaski	Episode: "The Most Beautiful, Fierce, Smart, Powerful Creature in the Entire World"
