= Jennifer Lame =

American film editor

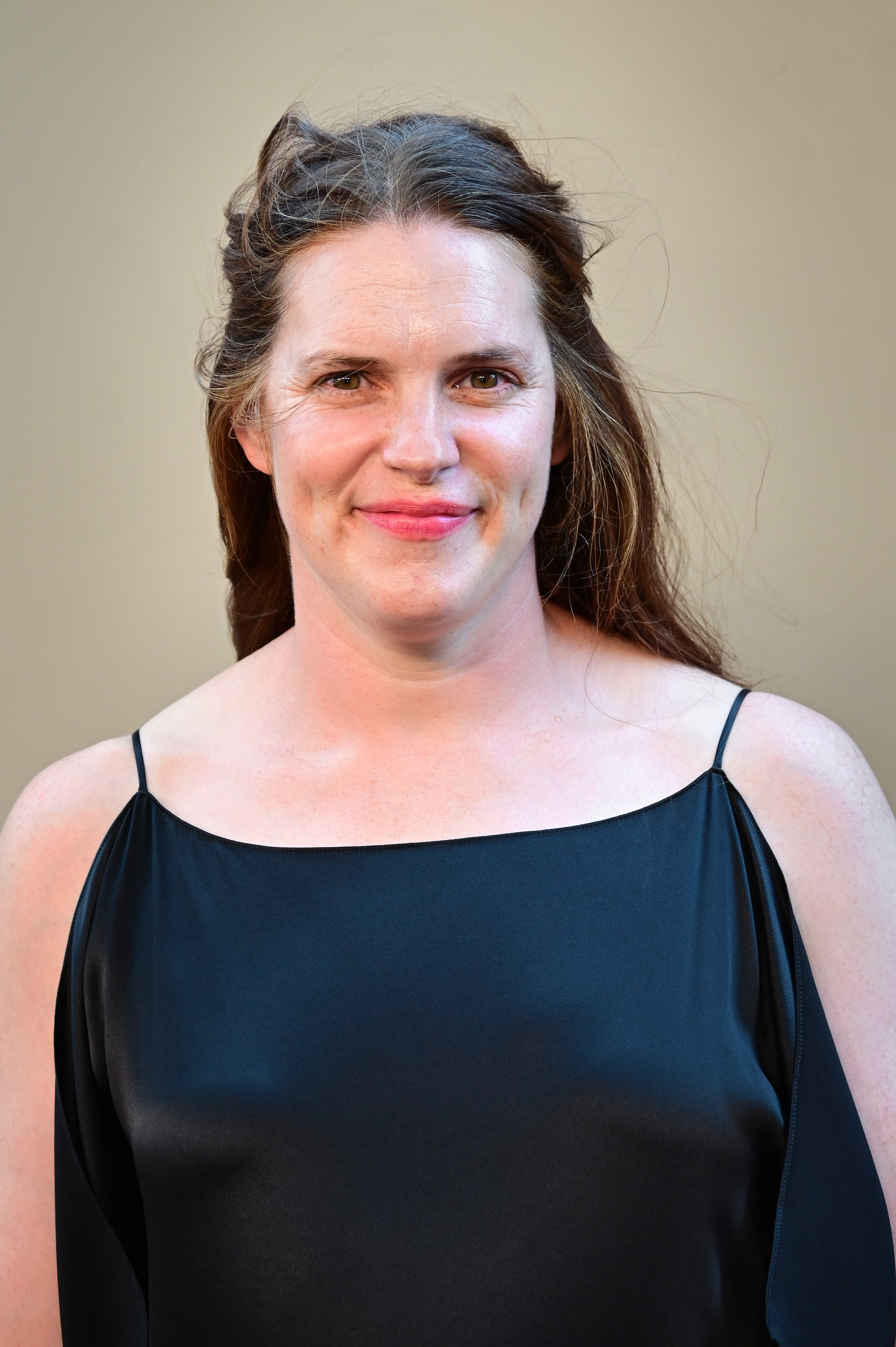
- Lame in 2026
- Born: 1981 or 1982 (age 44–45); Philadelphia, Pennsylvania, U.S.
- Education: Wesleyan University
- Occupation: Film editor
- Years active: 2005–present
- Notable work: Manchester by the Sea; Hereditary; Tenet; Black Panther: Wakanda Forever; Oppenheimer
- Spouse: Craig Shilowich (m. 2014)

Jennifer Lame (born 1981/1982) is an American film editor. She is known for her work on Manchester by the Sea, Hereditary, Black Panther: Wakanda Forever, and the films of Noah Baumbach and Christopher Nolan. In 2024, she won the Academy Award for Best Film Editing for her work on Nolan’s Oppenheimer. She worked again with Nolan in 2026 on The Odyssey. She is a native of Narberth, Pennsylvania and is married to film producer Craig Shilowich.

== Early life ==
Jennifer Lame was born in 1981 or 1982 in Philadelphia. Her father is Tony Lame, a former contributor to The Philadelphia Inquirer as well as KYW-TV. She attended Episcopal Academy and, in 2004, graduated from Wesleyan University.

== Career ==
Lame started editing films with Price Check. She has become a recurring collaborator on Noah Baumbach's films including Frances Ha, While We're Young, Mistress America, The Meyerowitz Stories, and Marriage Story. She also edited Paper Towns, Manchester by the Sea, Tyrel, Hereditary, Midsommar, Tenet, Black Panther: Wakanda Forever, and Oppenheimer. Just before winning her first Oscar, she was named Time's "Person of the Week" for her role as a prominent female editor. In 2025, she served as editor for an "immersive" version of the 1939 film The Wizard of Oz for Sphere in Las Vegas.

== Filmography ==
Key
†	Denotes films that have not yet been released

=== Film ===
Year	Title	Director	Notes	Refs
2007	Before the Devil Knows You're Dead	Sidney Lumet	Apprentice	
2007	Reservation Road	Terry George	Apprentice	
2009	Sorry, Thanks	Dia Sokol Savage	Assistant	
2009	The Lovely Bones	Peter Jackson	Second assistant	
2011	Almost Perfect	Bertha Bay-Sa Pan	Assistant	
2012	Price Check	Michael Walker		
2012	Frances Ha	Noah Baumbach	First collaboration with Noah Baumbach	
2014	While We're Young	Noah Baumbach	Second collaboration with Noah Baumbach	
2015	Paper Towns	Jake Schreier	With Jacob Craycroft	
2015	Mistress America	Noah Baumbach	Third collaboration with Noah Baumbach	
2016	De Palma	Noah Baumbach; Jake Paltrow	Additional editor Fourth collaboration with Noah Baumbach	
2016	Manchester by the Sea	Kenneth Lonergan	Nominated - American Cinema Editors Award for Best Edited Feature Film – Dramatic; Nominated - BAFTA Award for Best Editing; Nominated - Central Ohio Film Critics Association Award for Best Film Editing	
2017	The Meyerowitz Stories	Noah Baumbach	Fifth collaboration with Noah Baumbach	
2018	Tyrel	Sebastián Silva		
2018	Hereditary	Ari Aster	First collaboration with Ari Aster	
2019	Midsommar	Ari Aster	Additional editor Second collaboration with Ari Aster	
2019	Marriage Story	Noah Baumbach	Sixth collaboration with Noah Baumbach; Nominated - American Cinema Editors Award for Best Edited Feature Film – Dramatic; Nominated - Satellite Award for Best Editing; Nominated - San Diego Film Critics Society Award for Best Editing; Nominated - St. Louis Gateway Film Critics Association Award for Best Film Editing	
2020	Tenet	Christopher Nolan	First collaboration with Christopher Nolan; Nominated - Chicago Film Critics Association Award for Best Editing; Nominated - Critics' Choice Movie Award for Best Editing; Nominated - London Film Critics Circle Awards 2020 – Technical Achievement Award; Nominated - Online Film Critics Society Award for Best Editing; Nominated - San Diego Film Critics Society Award for Best Editing; Nominated - San Francisco Bay Area Film Critics Circle Awards 2020 for Best Editing; Won - Washington D.C. Area Film Critics Association Awards 2020 for Best Editing; Nominated - Saturn Award for Best Editing	
2021	Judas and the Black Messiah	Shaka King	Additional editor	
2022	Blonde	Andrew Dominik	Additional editor	
2022	Black Panther: Wakanda Forever	Ryan Coogler	Nominated - Black Reel Awards for Outstanding Editing	
2023	Oppenheimer	Christopher Nolan	Second collaboration with Christopher Nolan; Won - Academy Award for Best Film Editing; Won - American Cinema Editors Award for Best Edited Feature Film – Dramatic; Won - Austin Film Critics Association Award for Best Film Editing; Won - BAFTA Award for Best Editing; Won - Boston Online Film Critics Association Award for Best Editing; Won - Chicago Film Critics Association Award for Best Editing; Won - Critics' Choice Movie Award for Best Editing; Won - HPA Award for Outstanding Editing – Feature Film; Won - Indiana Film Journalists Association Award for Best Editing; Won - Las Vegas Film Critics Society Award for Best Film Editing; Won - Phoenix Film Critics Society Award for Best Editing; Won - Saturn Award for Best Editing; Won - St. Louis Film Critics Association Award for Best Editing; Won - Washington D.C. Area Film Critics Association Award for Best Editing; Nominated - Alliance of Women Film Journalists Award for Best Editing; Nominated - Boston Society of Film Critics Award for Best Editing; Nominated - San Diego Film Critics Society Award for Best Editing; Nominated - Astra Film and Creative Award for Best Editing; Nominated - Utah Film Critics Association Award for Best Film Editing	
2023	Postcard from Earth	Darren Aronofsky	Documentary	
2025	The Wizard of Oz at Sphere	Victor Fleming	Immersive version of the 1939 film Originally edited by Blanche Sewell	
2026	The Odyssey	Christopher Nolan	Third collaboration with Christopher Nolan	

=== Television ===
Year	Title	Director	Notes	Refs
2005	The Simple Life	Jeff Fisher	Digitizer; Episode: "Mortuary"	
2008	Brotherhood	Various	Assistant; 5 episodes	
2009	The Philanthropist	Various	Assistant; 7 episodes	
2010	Rubicon	Various	Assistant; 5 episodes	
2011	30 Rock	Tricia Brock	Assistant; Episode: "Mrs. Donaghy"	
2012	Smash	Michael Mayer	Assistant; Episode: "Pilot"	
