= Paint (2020 film) =

- Directed by: Michael Walker
- Written by: Michael Walker
- Produced by: Alfred Theodore Sapse
- Starring: Josh Caras; Olivia Luccardi; Paul Cooper; Comfort Clinton; François Arnaud; Daniel Bellomy; Kaliswa Brewster; Vince Nappo; Amy Hargreaves; Austin Pendleton; David Patrick Kelly
- Distributed by: Gravitas Ventures
- Release date: December 15, 2020
- Running time: 95 minutes
- Country: United States
- Language: English

Paint is a 2020 American comedy film written and directed by Michael Walker and starring Josh Caras, Olivia Luccardi, Paul Cooper, Comfort Clinton, François Arnaud, Daniel Bellomy, Kaliswa Brewster, Vince Nappo, Amy Hargreaves, Austin Pendleton and David Patrick Kelly.

== Cast ==
- Josh Caras as Dan Pierson
- Olivia Luccardi as Kelsey Frick
- Paul Cooper as Quinn Donahue
- François Arnaud as Connor Fontaine
- Comfort Clinton as Stephanie Buckland
- Vince Nappo as Brett Wysinski
- Amy Hargreaves as Leslie Pierson
- David Patrick Kelly as David Crays
- Austin Pendleton as Professor Winston
- Wakeema Hollis as Christina
- Daniel Bellomy as Austin Gamby
- Kaliswa Brewster as Claire Babchak
- Kate Stone as Chloe Brown

== Release ==
In September 2020, it was announced the American distribution rights to the film were acquired by Gravitas Ventures. The film premiered at the 2020 Dances with Films Festival and was released on VOD on December 15, 2020.

== Reception ==
The film has a 92% rating on Rotten Tomatoes based on twelve reviews.

Alex Saveliev of Film Threat rated the film a 7 out of 10.
