= Tenet =

2020 film by Christopher Nolan

- Theatrical release poster
- Directed by: Christopher Nolan
- Written by: Christopher Nolan
- Produced by: Emma Thomas; Christopher Nolan
- Starring: John David Washington; Robert Pattinson; Elizabeth Debicki; Dimple Kapadia; Michael Caine; Kenneth Branagh
- Cinematography: Hoyte van Hoytema
- Edited by: Jennifer Lame
- Music by: Ludwig Göransson
- Production company: Syncopy
- Distributed by: Warner Bros. Pictures
- Release dates: August 26, 2020 (United Kingdom); September 3, 2020 (United States)
- Running time: 150 minutes
- Countries: United Kingdom; United States
- Language: English
- Budget: $205 million
- Box office: $376.6 million

Tenet (stylized in all caps, previously as TENƎꓕ (Note: The use of this stylization was discontinued in May 2020 to avoid brand confusion with an unrelated company.)) is a 2020 science fiction action film written and directed by Christopher Nolan, who also produced it with his wife, Emma Thomas. It stars John David Washington, Robert Pattinson, Elizabeth Debicki, Dimple Kapadia, Michael Caine, and Kenneth Branagh. The film follows a CIA officer who is recruited into a secret organization, tasked with tracing the origin of objects that are traveling backward through time and their connection to an attack by the future.

Nolan took over five years to write the screenplay after deliberating about Tenet's central ideas for more than a decade. Pre-production began in late 2018, casting took place in March 2019, and principal photography lasted six months in multiple countries. After delays due to the COVID-19 pandemic, Tenet was released in the United Kingdom on August 26, 2020, and in the United States on September 3, 2020. It was Nolan's last film to be released by Warner Bros. Pictures.

Tenet was the first Hollywood tent-pole or blockbuster to open in theaters during the pandemic and grossed $376.6 million worldwide on a $205 million budget, making it the fifth-highest-grossing film of 2020 despite failing to break even. The film received generally favorable reviews, but divided critics more than Nolan's previous works. It won Best Visual Effects at the 93rd Academy Awards and received numerous other accolades.

== Plot ==
On "the 14th," the Protagonist leads a covert CIA extraction during a staged terrorist siege at an Opera House in Kyiv. Compromised, he is saved from KORD forces by a masked operative whose bag has an orange trinket. The Protagonist retrieves an artifact, but his team is captured and tortured. He swallows a suicide pill but wakes up to find it was a fake—a test that only he passed. He is recruited by "Tenet", a secretive organization that briefs him on objects with "inverted" entropy that move backward through time. With his handler Neil, he traces inverted munitions to Priya Singh, an arms dealer in Mumbai.

Priya reveals that she is also a member of Tenet and that the man who inverted her bullets, Russian oligarch Andrei Sator, is communicating with the future. Sator's estranged wife Kat Barton is an art appraiser who authenticated a Goya forged by her friend Arepo. Sator purchased the Goya and used it to blackmail Kat into staying with him. To earn Kat's help, the Protagonist and Neil try to steal the Goya from Sator's freeport facility at Oslo Airport, but two masked men, who emerge from either side of a machine, thwart them. In Mumbai, Priya explains it was a "turnstile"—a device that inverts entropy. The two men were the same person but traveling in opposite directions through time. She reveals it was Sator who sabotaged his CIA team and that KORD has the artifact, which is weapons-grade plutonium.

Believing the Protagonist has destroyed the forgery, Kat introduces him to Sator in Italy. Sator agrees to help steal the artifact, which the Protagonist and Neil do in Tallinn, but an inverted Sator ambushes them and holds Kat hostage. The Protagonist hides the artifact and rescues Kat, but they are recaptured and taken to a freeport in Tallinn where the inverted Sator interrogates them for the artifact's location and shoots Kat with an inverted bullet. Tenet troops led by Commander Ives arrive, but Sator escapes into the turnstile. To save Kat's life, they also invert via the turnstile. The inverted Protagonist drives back to the ambush to retrieve the hidden artifact but encounters Sator, who overpowers him and takes it.

To un-invert, the Protagonist travels further back in time to the Oslo freeport, fights his past self, and enters the turnstile, followed by Neil and Kat. Later in Oslo, Priya tells him Sator now has all nine pieces of the Algorithm, a device future antagonists need to invert the world's entropy to destroy its past. Priya planned for Sator to get the artifact to reveal the other eight pieces in preparing his dead drop. Recalling an earlier conversation with Michael Crosby, he realizes it is a nuclear hypocenter detonated on the 14th in Sator's hometown, the closed city of Stalsk-12.

On a Tenet ship traveling back to the 14th, Kat reveals Sator has terminal cancer and is omnicidal. They surmise that after the Kyiv opera house siege on the 14th, Sator returns to a family vacation in Vietnam to take his own life, sending the dead drop coordinates to the future via a dead man's switch.

Arriving on the 14th, Kat poses as her past self in Vietnam as the Tenet forces in Stalsk-12 try to recover the Algorithm. They use a "temporal" pincer movement—inverted and non-inverted troops create a diversion so the Protagonist and Ives can steal the Algorithm before detonation. Sator's henchman, Volkov, traps them in the hypocenter. Calling from Vietnam, Sator explains the antagonists are trying to prevent the effects of climate change. As Volkov is about to execute the Protagonist, an inverted soldier with an orange trinket appears and sacrifices himself, enabling the Protagonist and Ives to escape with the Algorithm. The hypocenter detonates in Stalsk-12 just as Kat kills Sator in Vietnam.

In Stalsk-12, the Protagonist, Neil, and Ives arrange to separate and hide pieces of the Algorithm. The Protagonist notices the orange trinket on Neil's bag. Neil reveals that he was recruited in his past by a future Protagonist and that Neil has known him for a long time. Neil leaves them his piece of the Algorithm as he inverts to return to where he sacrifices himself in the hypocenter. Later, in London, Priya plans to kill Kat to maintain the secrecy of Tenet. Having realized he is Tenet's creator, the Protagonist kills Priya and watches Kat leave with her son.

== Cast ==
- John David Washington as the "Protagonist", a CIA operative and founder of Tenet
- Robert Pattinson as Neil, an agent in Mumbai
- Kenneth Branagh as Andrei Sator, a British-domiciled Russian oligarch
- Elizabeth Debicki as Katherine "Kat" Barton, art appraiser, and Sator's estranged wife
- Dimple Kapadia as Priya Singh, an Indian arms trafficker, and also a member of Tenet
- Michael Caine as Sir Michael Crosby, a British intelligence officer, and contact of Priya Singh
- Martin Donovan as Fay, the Protagonist's CIA boss
- Aaron Taylor-Johnson as Ives, a Tenet military commander
- Fiona Dourif as Wheeler, leader of the Tenet Blue Team
- Yuri Kolokolnikov as Volkov, Sator's bodyguard
- Himesh Patel as Mahir, a Tenet agent hired by Neil
- Clémence Poésy as Barbara, a Tenet scientist

Also appearing are Jefferson Hall, the "Well-Dressed Man", whom the Protagonist tries to extract at the opera house; Andrew Howard as the Driver who sabotages the CIA's Kyiv operation and tortures the Protagonist; Wes Chatham as SWAT 3, a member of the Protagonist's covert CIA team in Kyiv; Denzil Smith as Sanjay Singh, Priya's husband; Jeremy Theobald as the steward at the Reform Club; Laurie Shepherd as Max, Kat and Sator's son; Jack Cutmore-Scott as Klaus, an employee of security firm Rotas at the freeport in Oslo; Josh Stewart as the voice of a Tenet agent in Mumbai; and Sean Avery as the lead soldier on the Red Team.

== Production ==
=== Writing and pre-production ===
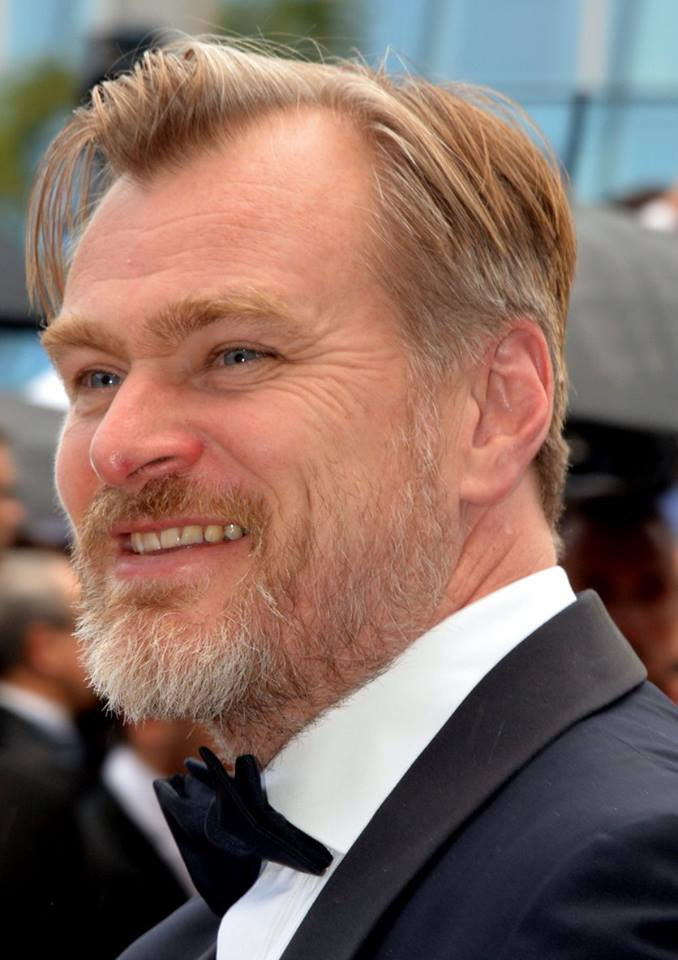
Writer, director and co-producer Christopher Nolan

Writer and director Christopher Nolan conceived the ideas behind Tenet over the course of twenty years, but began working on the script in 2014. The title, as well as being a palindrome, is an allusion to the Sator Square. Inspired by a feeling about how he imagined Sergio Leone made Once Upon a Time in the West (1968), Nolan avoided watching any spy films that might influence him while making Tenet, instead relying upon his memories.

The science fiction aspect of the film revolves around the ability to reverse the entropy of things and people, resulting in time reversibility. While the film does refer to real concepts from physics, among them annihilation, the second law of thermodynamics, Maxwell's demon, the grandfather paradox, and Feynman and Wheeler's Absorber Theory, Nolan stated that "we're not going to make any case for this being scientifically accurate". Commenting on the scientific aspects of writing the script, he stated: "I think the scientific method is the best tool we have for analyzing and understanding the world around us ... I've been very inspired by working with great scientists like Kip Thorne, who I worked with on Interstellar (2014), who also helped me out with some early analysis of the ideas I wanted to explore to do with time and quantum physics on Tenet, although I promised him I wasn't going to bandy his name around as if there was some kind of scientific reality to Tenet. It's a very different kettle of fish to Interstellar."

For both the production and the distribution of the film, which had an estimated budget of $200 million, Nolan continued his relationship with Warner Bros. and his production company Syncopy. Tenet was the last Syncopy film to be distributed by Warner Bros. before leaving the film studio in January 2021. Nolan and production designer Nathan Crowley traveled to scout for locations in February and April 2019. Disappointed with the Royal Swedish Opera as a potential stand-in for the Kyiv Opera House, Crowley instead chose the Linnahall, which fit his affinity for Brutalist architecture. The production decided to film at the National Liberal Club after management at Sotheby's refused to participate, at Cannon Hall after Thornhill Primary School in Islington and Channing School were deemed unsatisfactory, and at Shree Vardhan Tower after it was determined that security at the Antilia was too high to film there.

=== Casting ===
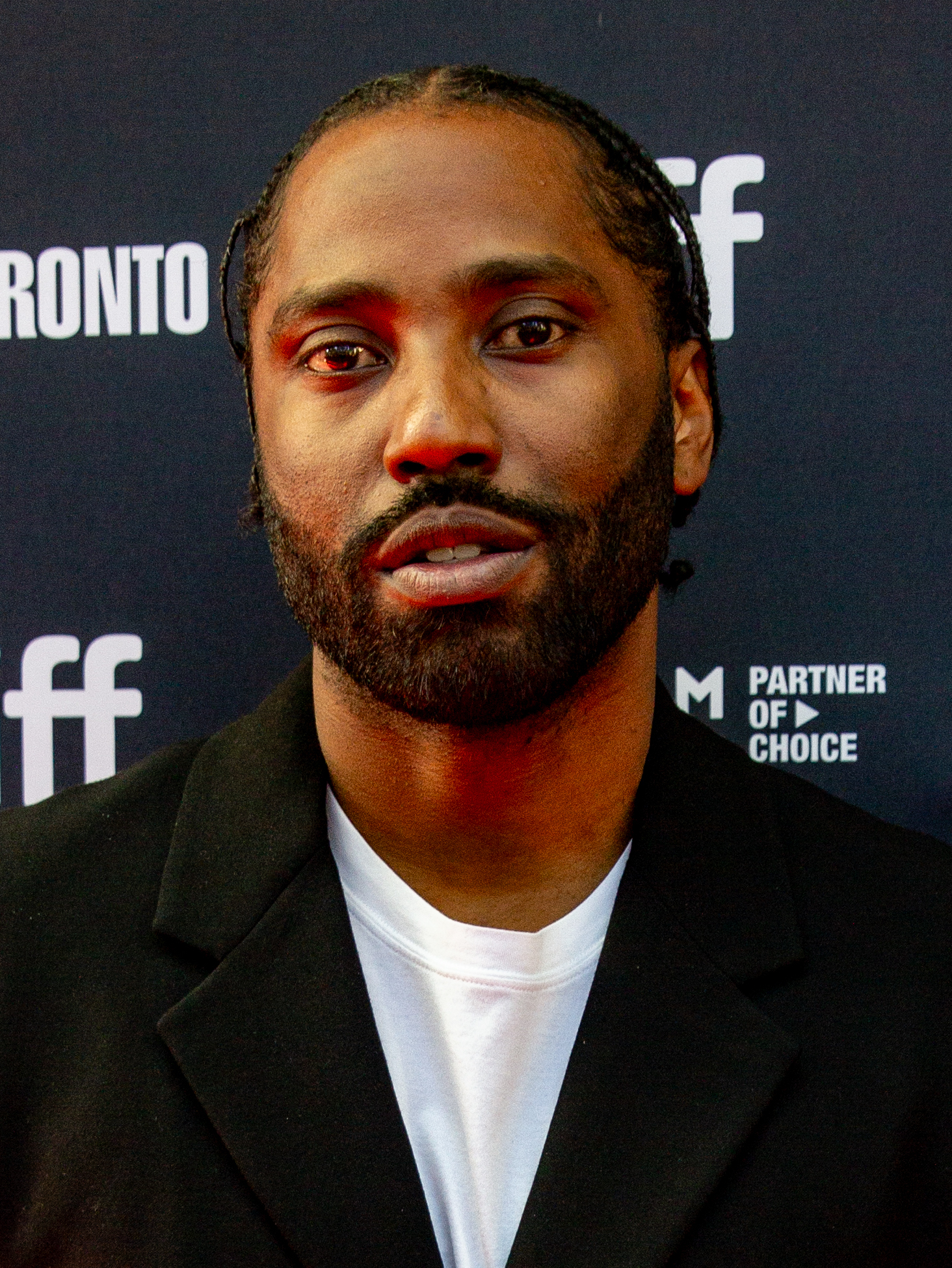
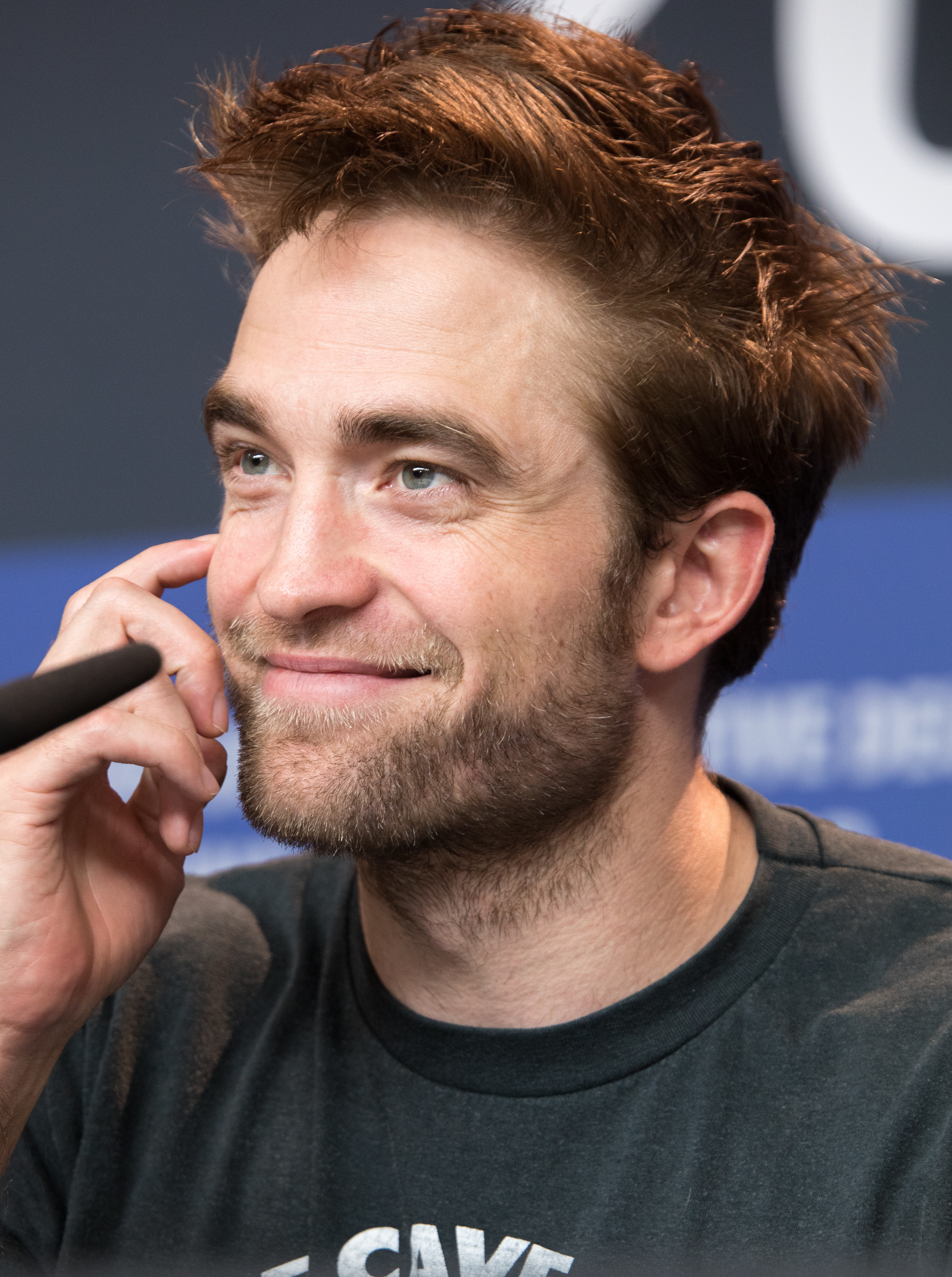
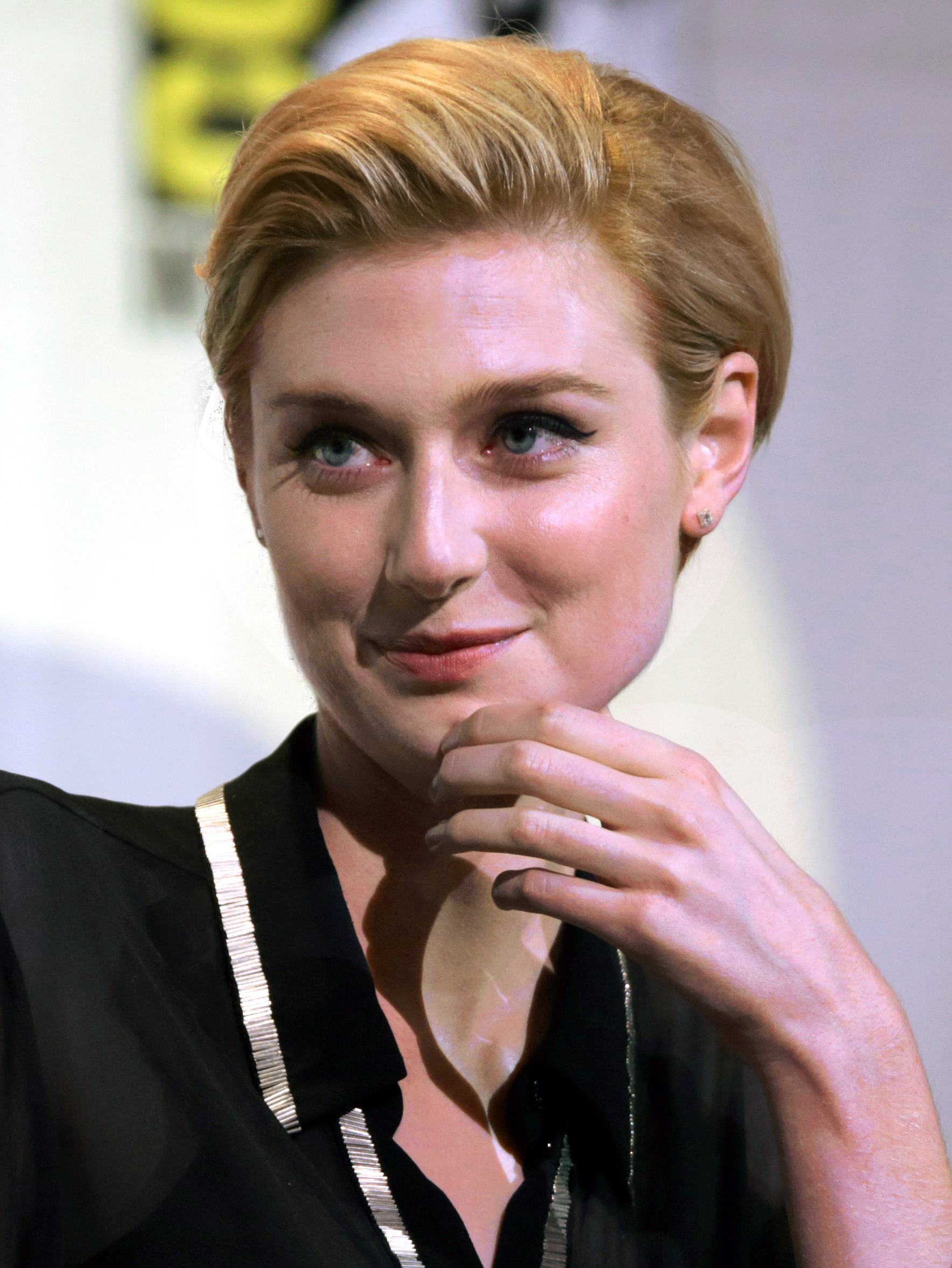
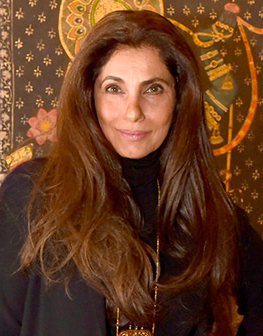
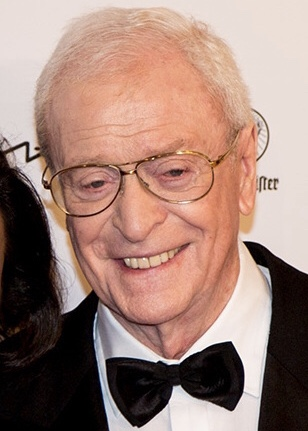
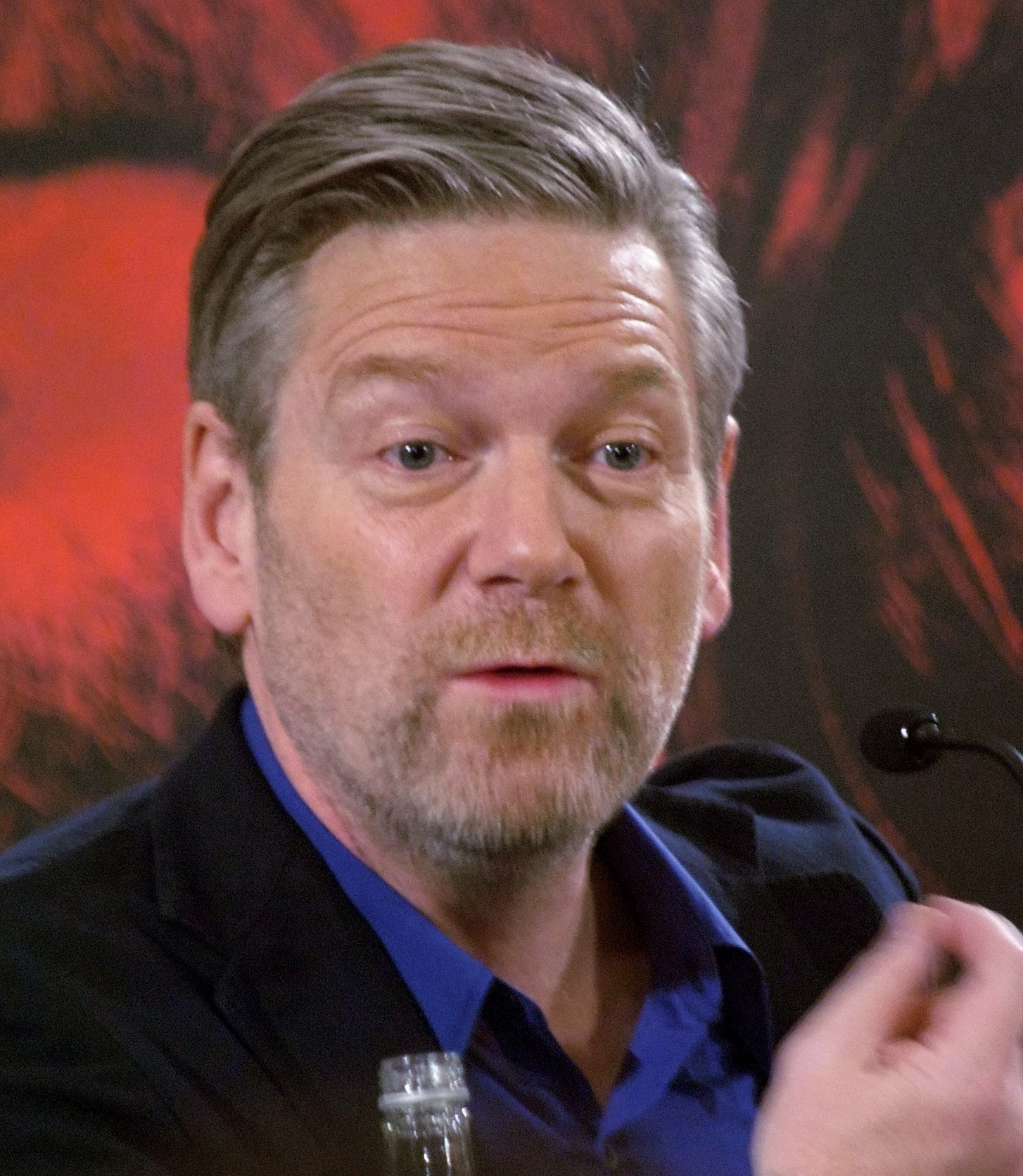
The film's cast includes John David Washington, Robert Pattinson, Elizabeth Debicki, Dimple Kapadia, Michael Caine and Kenneth Branagh.

John David Washington, Robert Pattinson, and Elizabeth Debicki were cast in March 2019. Each of them was permitted to read the screenplay only while locked in a room. Nolan chose Washington based on his performance in BlacKkKlansman (2018). Washington kept diaries in which he expanded the Protagonist's backstory. Pattinson took some of Neil's mannerisms from political journalist and author Christopher Hitchens. Kat was originally going to be an older woman, but Debicki's appearance in Widows (2018) convinced the filmmakers otherwise.

The casting of Dimple Kapadia, Aaron Taylor-Johnson, Clémence Poésy, Michael Caine, and Kenneth Branagh was announced as filming started. Kapadia's screen test was put together by director Homi Adajania while working on his film Angrezi Medium (2020). Caine was only given the pages from the script that included what was filmed on his one day of work. To take his part, Branagh rescheduled production on his own directorial venture Death on the Nile (2022), and claimed to have studied the manuscript more times than any other in his career. Himesh Patel joined the production in August. Martin Donovan's inclusion was revealed in the first trailer for the film.

=== Design and special effects ===
Special effects supervisor Scott R. Fisher watched World War II films and documentaries to find reference points for the film that were based in reality. Prop prototypes were often 3D printed. Costume designer Jeffrey Kurland and his team cut and stitched the clothing for the film in the United States, manufacturing it for the main cast and thousands of extras. Production designer Nathan Crowley ordered around thirty military wristwatches from Hamilton Watch Company, each analog with a digital countdown.

=== Filming ===
Tallinn locations featured in the film

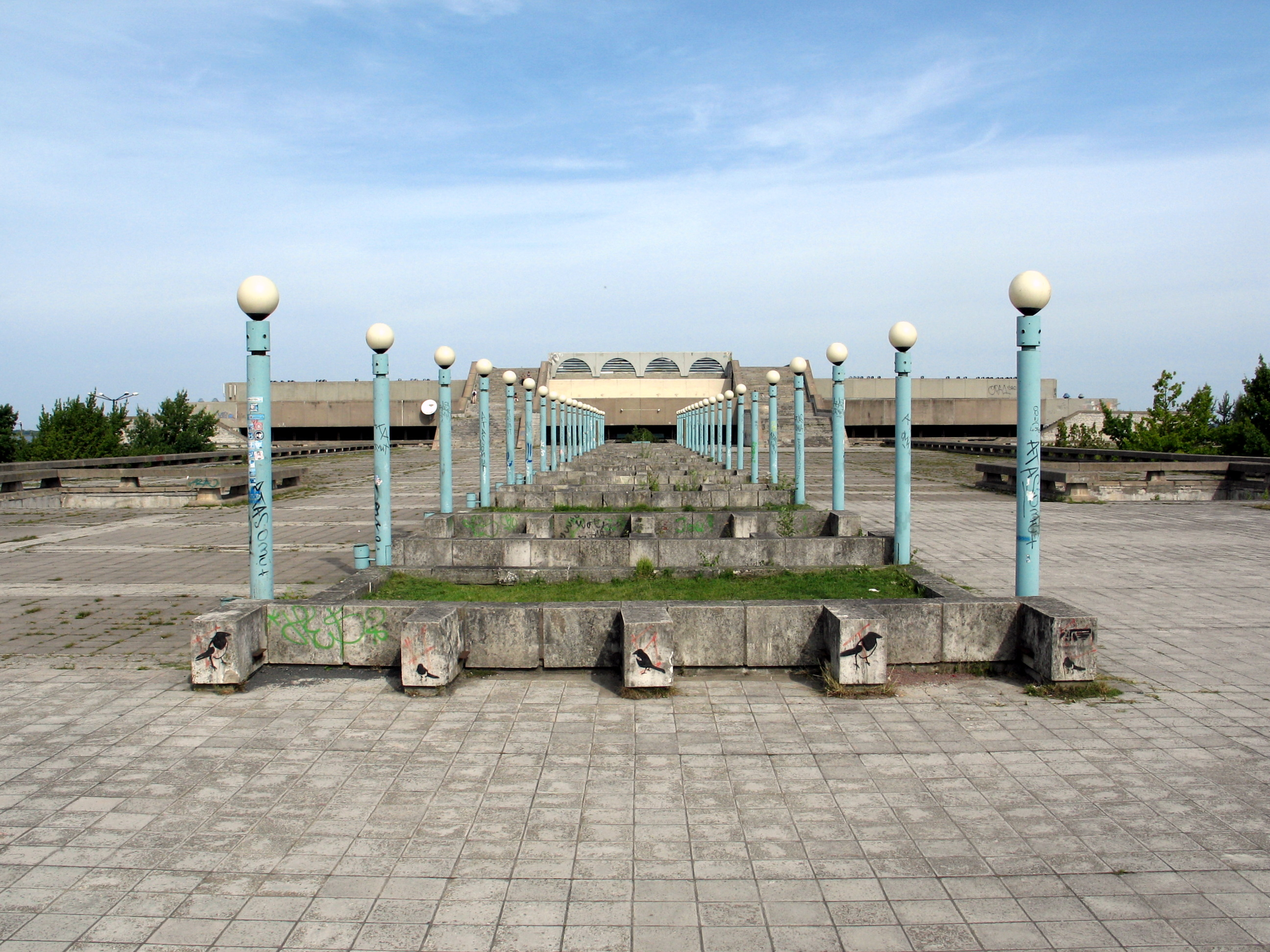
Linnahall, the location for the fictional Kyiv Opera House

The Kumu museum, the location for the fictional Oslo freeport

Principal photography, involving a crew that Pattinson estimated at 500 people, began on May 22, 2019, in a soundstage in Los Angeles, and eventually incorporated seven countries—Denmark, Estonia, (Note: Seven weeks of filming in Estonia came at a cost of €16.5 million; Warner Bros. Pictures paid a rebate that was reimbursed at thirty percent.) India, (Note: It took one week to secure the permission to shoot in Mumbai. The planned schedule was completed in half the time.) Italy, Norway, the United Kingdom, and the United States. (Note: Tenet went under the working title Merry Go Round.) Filming in Estonia took place in June and July, with the Linnahall, Pärnu Highway (E67), and adjacent streets closed to facilitate the production. Kumu Art Museum doubled as the fictional Oslo Freeport. Barbara's office was built in a former law court, the Tallinn Freeport exterior was at the city docks, and a room at the Hilton Tallinn Park Hotel was also used. Mayor of Tallinn Mihhail Kõlvart expressed concerns about potential disruptions, as the shooting schedule required that the arterial Laagna Road be closed for one month. A compromise was eventually reached, involving temporary road closures and detours.

Scenes were shot at Villa Cimbrone on the Amalfi Coast (Italy) and at Cannon Hall (United Kingdom) from July to August, and on the roof of the Oslo Opera House, at The Thief hotel (Norway), and in Rødbyhavn at Nysted Wind Farm (Denmark) in early September. A five-day shoot occurred later that month in Mumbai, specifically at Breach Candy Hospital, Cafe Mondegar, Colaba Causeway, Colaba Market, Gateway of India, Grant Road, Royal Bombay Yacht Club, and the Taj Mahal Palace Hotel. A restaurant named "Chaand" was erected near the hotel, but was never used, serving only as an unneeded alternate location. Forty boats were positioned at the Gateway of India, where the crew rescued a man who had attempted suicide.

Eagle Mountain locations featured in the film as Stalsk-12
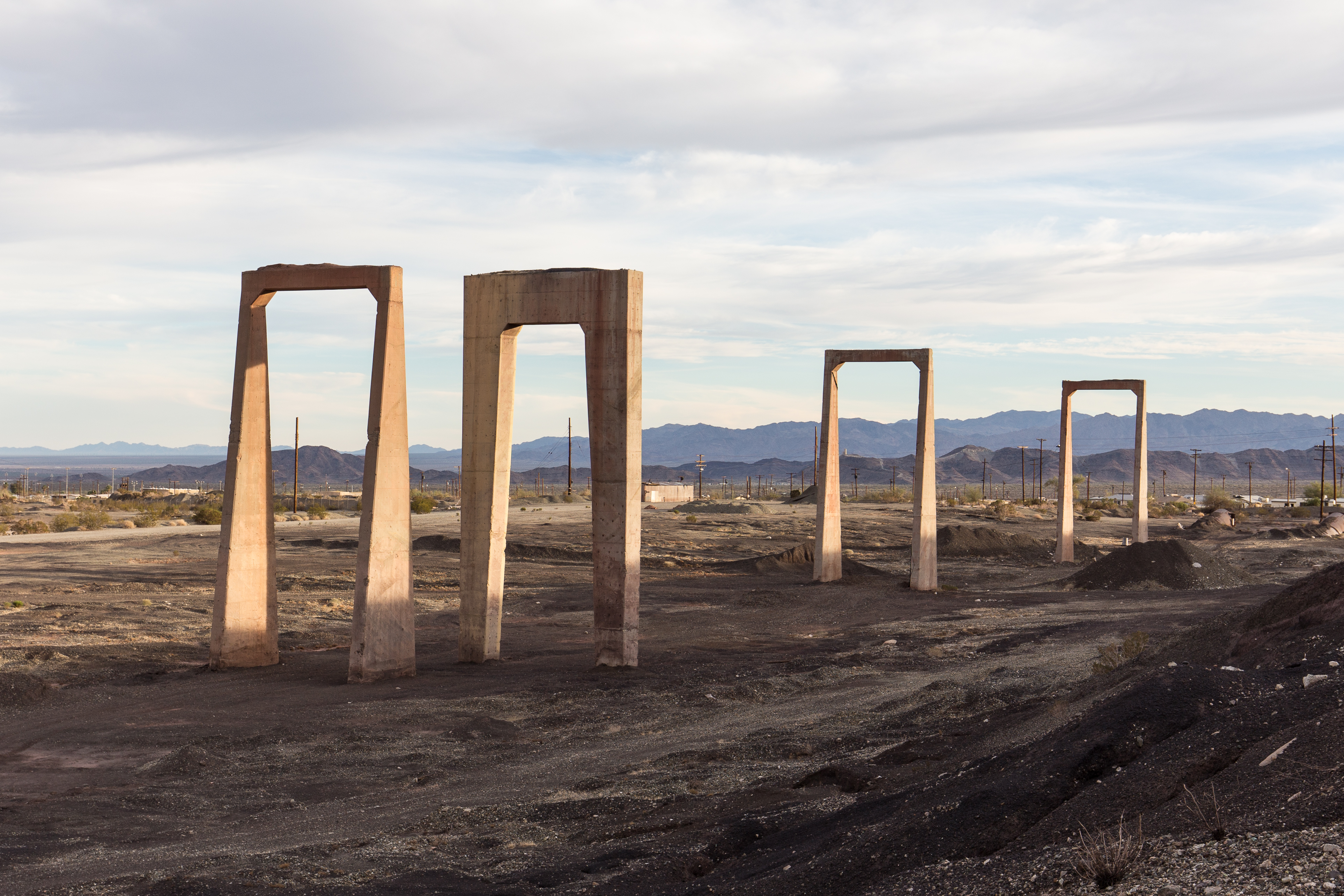
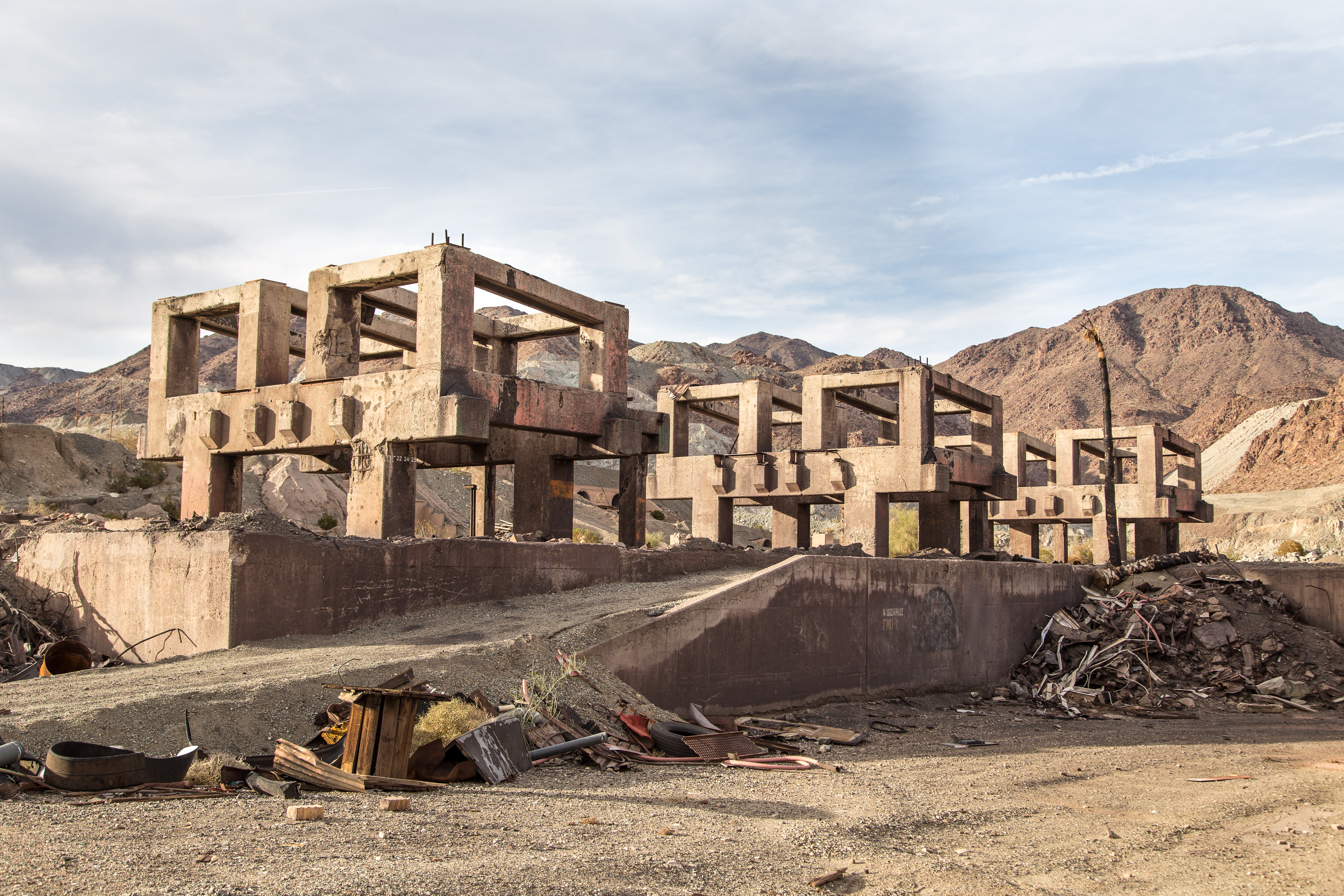

Production proceeded in Los Angeles, where Hawthorne Plaza Shopping Center functioned as the interior set of an icebreaker and a shipping container. The Victorville Airport was disguised as Oslo, with more than ninety extras involved. Instead of using miniatures and visual effects (VFX) for the plane crash sequence, Nolan determined that purchasing a Boeing 747 proved more cost-effective. In October, filming moved to Eagle Mountain, where an abandoned town had been constructed and hundreds were clothed in military camouflage uniforms. Over thirty buildings were prefabricated in Los Angeles and shipped to the site. Four Boeing CH-47 Chinooks were loaned out for four days. Outside shots of a tunnel were done in the desert, while the cavernous insides of the Hypocenter were fashioned on Warner Soundstage 16, their largest, with 32,130 square feet. Tenet wrapped on November 12, after 96 days of shooting.

Director of photography Hoyte van Hoytema employed a combination of 70 mm film and IMAX, prioritizing Panavision lenses that would best accommodate lower light. Segments that concerned time inversion were captured in both backward- and forward-mobility and speech. To ensure proficiency in handling firearms, Washington and Pattinson attended the Taran Tactical firing range in Simi Valley. They did some of their own stunts. Over one hundred watercraft were recruited for the film, including two F50 catamarans, the superyacht Planet Nine (onto which an Mi-8 helicopter landed), an icebreaker, a cargo tanker, fishing boats, and speedboats. The windfarm vessel Iceni Revenge was used for the three months spent filming in Denmark, Estonia, and Italy.

=== Post-production ===
During filming, sound designer Richard King sent a team to Eagle Mountain to record the Chinooks and Mi-8, and to Southampton to record the F50 catamarans. Others were hired to capture the aural atmosphere of Oslo, Mumbai, and Tallinn. King got audio of both live and blank automatic weapon rounds at a gun range in San Francisquito Canyon and rented a runway to test how the vehicles in the film sound.

Jennifer Lame replaced Nolan's long-time editor Lee Smith, who was occupied with 2019's 1917. Visual effects supervisor Andy Lockley said the film's VFX shots involved the participation of 300 employees at DNEG.

== Music ==
Ludwig Göransson was chosen to compose the film's music after Nolan's frequent collaborator and first choice, Hans Zimmer, turned down the offer in favor of the 2021 film Dune. Researching retrograde composition led Göransson to generate melodies that would sound the same forward and backward. He experimented with distorted industrial noise and, to represent Sator's irradiated breathing, asked Nolan to tape his own breath in a studio. Göransson produced ten to fifteen minutes of music each week. The first scoring session was held in November 2019, and sessions continued into early 2020. During the COVID-19 pandemic, Göransson recorded musicians at their homes. The Tenet soundtrack contains "The Plan", a song by Travis Scott, which plays over the film's closing credits.

== Marketing ==
In August 2019, Warner Bros. debuted a forty-second teaser ahead of Hobbs & Shaw previews, which was published online in December. Yohana Desta of Vanity Fair called it an "old-school surprise" and praised Göransson's score, while Jim Vejvoda of IGN described it as "Inception with time travel". Both Vejvoda and IndieWire's Zack Sharf noted the trailer's stylization of the film's title as TENƎT to emphasize the palindromic nature. The film's prologue also played in select IMAX theaters before screenings of Star Wars: The Rise of Skywalker, which Kyle Kizu of The Hollywood Reporter favorably compared to the prolog of Nolan's other films. The film's logo was altered in May 2020 to remove the inverted stylization due to its similarity with that of a bicycle components manufacturer. The final trailer was released in August and featured Scott's single. A making-of video was released on August 26.

The marketing and promotion of the film was significantly hampered due to postponements caused by the COVID-19 pandemic, with executives calculating that each postponement cost Warner Bros. between $200,000 and $400,000 in marketing fees. Eventually, after briefly being held up indefinitely, Glenn Whipp of the Los Angeles Times noted that Warner Bros. did not put Tenet on the Academy's streaming platform or send out screeners to awards voters. Given the large investment in the film, part of its marketing campaign involved dual promotions with the watch manufacturer Hamilton and Fortnite, both of whom assisted in increasing public awareness of the forthcoming film. Hamilton featured Washington wearing the watch and endorsing it in multiple ad campaigns, while Epic Games debuted a trailer for the film within Fortnite and created an interview with Washington which was featured on multiple video game websites.

== Release ==
=== Theatrical ===
Warner Bros. originally scheduled Tenet for a July 17, 2020, release in IMAX, 35 mm, and 70 mm film. Due to the COVID-19 pandemic, it was delayed to July 31, and then August 12. Nolan wanted the film released in theatres as the first Hollywood tent-pole after the prolonged shutdown, rather than on the HBO Max streaming service. Following a negotiation between Nolan and Warner Bros. executives, the studio arranged for the film to be released in seventy countries, with a run time of 150 minutes, on August 26, following preview screenings in Australia and South Korea on August 22 and 23. The film opened in select cities in the United States on September 3, gradually expanding in the ensuing weeks. On September 4, it was released in China. The lack of available movies afforded it more screens per multiplex than would otherwise have been possible.

On March 2, 2021, Warner Bros. announced that, in light of the New York state government allowing film theaters in New York City to re-open on Friday, March 5, following a nearly year-long shutdown (causing theaters in the city to miss out on the film's initial theatrical run), they would be re-releasing Tenet at select theaters in the city. In the Philippines, the film was released on HBO Go streaming platform on June 12, 2021, following the year-long indefinite closure of theaters in the country in response of a potential COVID-19 surge, becoming the last major Asian country to do so. The film was re-released in theaters for exclusive IMAX screenings in 70 mm formats for an exclusive one-week theatrical window from February 23 to March 1, 2024. It also included footage to promote the release of the studio's then-upcoming film, Dune: Part Two (2024).

Nolan subsequently expressed dissatisfaction with Warner Bros. over their handling of the film, along with the studio's announcement of their 2021 theatrical slate also being released on HBO Max day-and-date without consulting the people involved with that slate, which resulted in Nolan's following film, Oppenheimer, being financed and distributed by Universal Pictures instead. In 2023, Variety reported that Warner Bros. (having gone through an ownership and leadership change since the release of Tenet) offered Nolan a "seven-figure check" for him to return to the studio, consisting of the fees that Nolan waived to encourage the release of Tenet in theatres, which ultimately proved unsuccessful as Nolan later reteamed with Universal following the success of Oppenheimer for his next film, The Odyssey.

=== Home media ===
The film was released on 4K Ultra HD, Blu-ray, DVD, and digital download on December 15, 2020. It was added to HBO Max on May 1, 2021.

== Reception ==
=== Box office ===
As of September 16, 2026, Tenet has grossed $58.5 million in the United States and Canada and $318.1 million in other territories, for a worldwide total of $376.6 million.

With a production budget of $200 million, it is Nolan's most expensive original project. IndieWire speculated that marketing costs pushed the final sum to $300–350 million, though some analysts predicted it would incur lower advertising costs than usual, owing to inexpensive live sports ads. Box office analyst Jeff Bock estimated the film would need to make $400–500 million to break even. In November 2020, rival studios expected the film to lose up to $100 million, but Warner Bros. insisted losses would not top $50 million. Nolan received twenty percent of the film's first-dollar gross.

The film was projected to make $25–30 million internationally over its first five days. In South Korea, pre-sale IMAX tickets sold out, and weekend previews earned $717,000 from 590 venues. Another four days in the country yielded $4.13 million from about 2,200 screens, bringing the cume to $5.1 million by the end of the week. Tenet debuted to $53 million in forty-one countries, grossing $7.1 million in the United Kingdom, $6.7 million in France, and $4.2 million in Germany. It made $58.1 million its second weekend, with China ($30 million from first showings), the UK ($13.1 million), France ($10.7 million), Germany ($8.7 million), and South Korea ($8.2 million) as the largest markets. It made $30.6 million its third weekend, earning $16.4 million in the UK, $13.2 million in France, $11.4 million in Germany, $10.3 million in South Korea, and $10.2 million in China. The film earned $11.4 million in its first two weeks in Japan, and, after opening in India on December 4, 2020, made about $1.2 million in its first ten days in the country. In Estonia, Tenet became the highest-grossing film of all time, with a total gross of $1.2 million.

In the United States and Canada, with 65 percent of theaters operating at 25–40 percent capacity, the film earned $20.2 million from 2,810 theaters in its first eleven days of release: $12 million in the U.S., $2.5 million in Canada, and the rest from previews. The second, third, and fourth weekends added $6.6 million, $4.6 million, and $3.3 million, respectively. Tenet remained atop the American box office its fifth weekend with $2.7 million, before ceding the number one spot to The War with Grandpa its sixth weekend.

The film's worldwide 2024 IMAX re-release began on February 23, 2024, in 55 IMAX locations, including 12 showing the film in 70mm, opening against the one-week North American engagement of the Dolby Cinema reissue of Les Misérables (2012). It grossed $600,000 globally in its three-day opening weekend, with a per-theater average of more than $10,000.

=== Critical response ===
Tenet divided critics, with USA Today's Jenna Ryu and the Los Angeles Times's Christi Carras respectively describing the reviews as "mixed" and "all over the place". The Independent's Clémence Michallon wrote that the film was perceived as "both entertaining and 'cerebral' by some, but lacking and confusing by others". Ellise Shafer of Variety found that, while some were weary of the film's "metaphysical babble", reviews were "largely positive", with critics overall naming it "a mind-blowing addition to Nolan's already-impressive arsenal". On review aggregator Rotten Tomatoes, 70% of 380 critics gave Tenet a positive review, with an average rating of 7/10; the website's critical consensus reads: "A visually dazzling puzzle for film lovers to unlock, Tenet serves up all the cerebral spectacle audiences expect from a Christopher Nolan production." On Metacritic, the film has a weighted average score of 69 out of 100 based on 50 critics, indicating "generally favorable reviews".

Guy Lodge of Variety described Tenet as a "grandly entertaining, time-slipping spectacle". The Guardian critic Peter Bradshaw felt it was both "madly preposterous" and "amazing cinema". Kevin Maher of The Times awarded the film a full five stars, deeming it "a delightfully convoluted masterpiece". Robbie Collin of The Telegraph likened it to Nolan's Inception and praised the "depth, subtlety and wit of Pattinson and Debicki's performances". In his review for Rolling Stone, Peter Travers described the film as "pure, ravishing cinema" and called Washington a "star-in-the-making" who "brings a natural athletic grace to the stunts and hand-to-hand combat". The Dispatch's Alec Dent found Tenet to have "a gloriously innovative storyline with incredible visuals to match". Mark Daniell of the Toronto Sun gave the film four out of four stars, deeming it "the cinematic equivalent of a Rubik's Cube". Richard Roeper of the Chicago Sun-Times gave it three and a half out of four stars, praising Debicki's "mesmerizing" portrayal and concluding that "it's the kind of film that reminds us of the magic of the moviegoing experience", despite not reaching "cinematic greatness". Keith Phipps of The Ringer wrote that Tenet has the makings of a cult film, with "a failed release due to the pandemic, a muted critical reception, and a twisty narrative that demands multiple viewings". Director Denis Villeneuve called the film "a masterpiece" and "an incredible cinematic achievement".

James Berardinelli noted that the film "may be the most challenging of Nolan's films to date" in terms of "the concepts forming the narrative's foundation: backwards-moving entropy, non-linear thinking, temporal paradoxes", but questioned whether its runtime "might prove to be problematic". He named it the best film of 2020. Leslie Felperin of The Hollywood Reporter felt that Washington was "dashing but a little dull" and that Debicki's performance "adds a color to Nolan's palette, and [she] has persuasive chemistry with Branagh in their joint portrait of a violent, dysfunctional love-hate relationship". She concluded that Tenet is "rich in audacity and originality", but lacks "a certain humanity". Describing the film as “Nolan's time-bending take on James Bond”, Jessica Kiang of The New York Times praised the film's cinematography, score, editing, acting, and "immaculately creaseless costumes", while also deeming it a "hugely expensive, blissfully empty spectacle". LA Weekly's Asher Luberto also highlighted the similarities between Tenet and the James Bond films, but also felt it was "a daring, surprising and entirely original piece of work, reverent in its spectacle and haunting in its mesmerizing, dreamlike form". Branagh's character was described by some critics as a stereotypical Russian villain, to which end Christina Newland of Vulture.com called Branagh "silly-accented ... as a Bond-villain-esque Russian mastermind".

Some reviewers received Tenet more skeptically. Mike McCahill of IndieWire gave the film a "C−" grade and called it "a humorless disappointment". Michael Phillips of the Chicago Tribune awarded it two out of four stars, writing that he wished the film "exploited its own ideas more dynamically". The New York Post's Johnny Oleksinski also gave it two out of four stars, calling it Nolan's most "confusing" work so far, but acknowledged being "swept up by Nolan's incomparable cinematic vision". Kathleen Sachs of the Chicago Reader gave the film one and a half out of four stars, concluding that Nolan "doesn't show much growth in his most recent self-indulgent work". Brian Lloyd of Entertainment.ie said poor sound mixing "often" rendered dialog inaudible when viewed on 35 mm film, suggesting viewing the film on Digital Cinema Package files to reduce the problem. The San Francisco Chronicle's Mick LaSalle also found Tenet "difficult to understand", and continued that "even worse, it inspires little desire to understand it".

In July 2025, it was one of the films voted for the "Readers' Choice" edition of The New York Times' list of "The 100 Best Movies of the 21st Century," finishing at number 277. In 2025, The Hollywood Reporter listed Tenet as having the best stunts of 2020.

=== Audience reception ===
Audiences polled by CinemaScore gave the film an average grade of "B" on an A+ to F scale, and PostTrak reported that 80% of those gave the film a positive score, with 65% saying they would recommend it. Some publications reported that the film gained a cult following among science fiction enthusiasts and Nolan's fanbase.

=== Accolades ===
Tenet received nominations for Best Production Design and Best Visual Effects at the 93rd Academy Awards, winning the latter. At the 74th British Academy Film Awards, the film won the Best Special Visual Effects award, and also won an award in the same category at the 26th Critics' Choice Awards, out of its five nominations. It received a nomination for Best Original Score at the 78th Golden Globe Awards.

== Themes and analysis ==
Tenet's complex plot and character timelines, ambiguities and hidden details have been analyzed, leading to various fan theories and interpretations.

=== Palindromes and anadromes ===
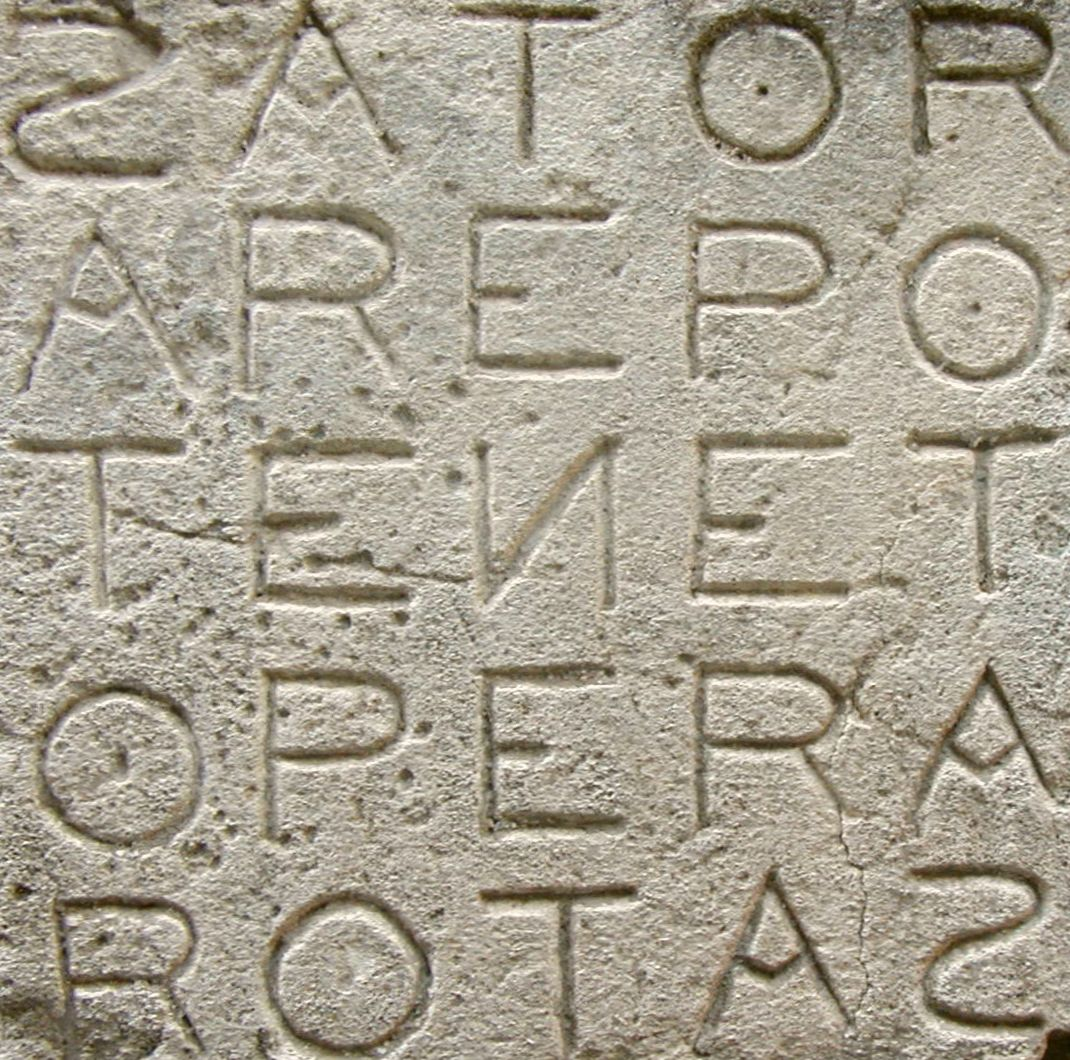
The first-century Latin Sator Square, which inspired the film's title, as well as two character names (Sator and Arepo, the Goya forger), the location of the opening sequence (Opera), and the name of Sator's security company (Rotas).

Palindromes (words which are spelled the same forward and backward) and anadromes (words which when spelled backward produce another word) appear throughout the film in various guises. The five-letter words from the palindromic Sator Square appear as names and locations in the film: "Sator" (the Russian oligarch); "Arepo" (the art forger); "Tenet" (the name of the film and the Protagonist's organization); "Opera" (the opening scene takes place at the Kyiv Opera House); and "Rotas" (the name of the security company running Oslo Freeport). (Note: The meaning of AREPO in the Sator Square is unknown. The Latin word "tenet", meaning "keeps", has cognates in many languages including Ukrainian and Russian (through the root *ten-)). The English word meaning "principle" is a cognate as well and shares the sense "abide/abode".) There is a further nod to the word "Tenet" in the film's final battle in which the red and blue teams each have "ten" minutes to carry out their non-inverted ("ten") and inverted ("net") operations in Stalsk-12. When the Protagonist is being tortured, trains pass by in opposite directions. Ludwig Göransson's score includes melodies that sound the same forward and backward. The film itself is a form of "temporal palindrome", as it ends at the same time as the events of the beginning of the film were taking place, "the 14th".

=== Temporal paradoxes and free will ===
Several characters have complex timelines in the film due to inverting and reverting, notably Neil, the Protagonist, Sator and Kat. Inversion allows multiple versions of a character to exist simultaneously; for instance, there are five simultaneous Neils (that are known) in the world during the moments of the climactic scene inside the Stalsk-12 hypocenter where he dies (two inverted and one normal on the battlefield, one normal at the opera siege and one more normal somewhere else in the world who will later meet the Protagonist in Neil's first appearance of the film), and the implication is that an older future Protagonist is orchestrating the events of the film behind the scenes without ever being seen by the viewer or his past self, in an example of a temporal pincer movement. Inversion also sets up bootstrap paradoxes, whereby events are caused by themselves in a "chicken or the egg" scenario.

Free will is a theme in Tenet. There are suggestions that Tenet's universe is deterministic, so what happens (including bootstrap paradoxes) will always happen, and consequently, there is arguably no free will. One of the film's common refrains, "ignorance is our ammunition", could hint at the illusionist stance that free will does not exist but people should act as if they have free will. However, the characters (especially Neil) express uncertainty as to whether history can be altered, and say several times during the film, "what's happened, happened". Neil's attitude towards free will could be interpreted as compatibilist, whereby free will and determinism are seen as compatible. Kat is seen as the character who most strongly embodies free will in Tenet by choosing to stray from the plan and shoot Sator, at which point she is free from his control. Kat relays to the Protagonist that when she was returning with Max to Sator's yacht in Vietnam and saw a woman (her future self, unbeknownst to past Kat) diving gracefully off the yacht, she felt jealous of that woman's freedom. Similarly, there is uncertainty in Tenet regarding the grandfather paradox and whether the use of the Algorithm in the future, wiping out the past (the time of the events in Tenet), would also wipe out the future. Tenet has been interpreted as a war between past and future.

=== Scientific accuracy ===
The plot revolves around reversing the entropy of things and people, resulting in time reversibility, and the film references physics concepts including the second law of thermodynamics, Maxwell's demon, and Feynman and Wheeler's notion of a one-electron universe; nonetheless, Christopher Nolan stated in the film's press notes: "we're not going to make any case for this being scientifically accurate".
