= The Maid's Room =

- Film poster
- Directed by: Michael Walker
- Written by: Michael Walker
- Produced by: Dolly Hall
- Starring: Paula Garces; Annabella Sciorra; Bill Camp; Philip Ettinger
- Cinematography: Scott Miller
- Edited by: Michael Taylor
- Music by: Arturo Rodríguez
- Release date: October 12, 2013 (Hamptons)
- Running time: 98 minutes
- Country: United States
- Language: English

The Maid's Room is a 2013 American psychological thriller film starring Paula Garces, Bill Camp, Annabella Sciorra and Philip Ettinger. The film was written and directed by Michael Walker.

== Plot ==
Drina, a girl from Colombia, comes to work as a maid for a wealthy family in Long Island. Their teenage son comes home drunk one night, while the parents are away. He apparently killed a man in a hit and run and said he hit a deer. The parents try to cover up. Drina wants to call the police. The father tries to stop her by bribing her with money but she refuses. The father kills her. The father solicits the aid of his son to bury Drina’s corpse in the marshes of their property. Drina’s friends show up at the house and demand to see her. The father lies and says she left and that she also stole money. These friends know that this is a lie. They keep on coming back, till one night the father shoots his own son, thinking it’s one of the intruders. The son dies ...and then jumps to a scene where the dad is looking out a window while his wife is sleeping.

== Cast ==
- Paula Garcés as Drina
- Annabella Sciorra as Mrs. Crawford
- Bill Camp as Mr. Crawford
- Philip Ettinger as Brandon Crawford

== Reception ==
On review aggregator Rotten Tomatoes, the film holds an approval rating of 25% based on 12 reviews, with an average rating of 4.57/10. On Metacritic, the film has a weighted average score of 39 out of 100, based on eight critics, indicating "generally unfavorable reviews". Nick Prigge of Slant Magazine awarded the film two stars out of four.
