= Klaus Darrelmann =

Germany-based location manager

Klaus Darrelmann (full name: Klaus große Darrelmann) is a Germany-based location manager, who received the 2015 Location Managers Guild of America (now Location Managers Guild International) Award for his work on The Grand Budapest Hotel in the category "Outstanding Locations in a Period Film".

For his participation in the Steven Spielberg drama Bridge of Spies he was co-nominated (with Jason Farrar and Markus Bensch) for the LMGI Award 2016 in the same category.
