= Michael Walker (filmmaker) =

American filmmaker (born 1967)

Michael Walker (born 1967) is an American filmmaker. He has written and directed six feature films, including Chasing Sleep, starring Jeff Daniels and Price Check, starring Parker Posey. His films have premiered at Toronto International Film Festival and Sundance Film Festival.

== Biography ==
Walker graduated from New York University Tisch School of the Arts in 1989. He also attended Stella Adler Studio of Acting in Los Angeles. He moved to Seattle where he made his first short film, Pie Eater, which premiered at the Hamptons Film Festival in 1995. He currently lives in New York City. His latest film, The Legend of Juan Jose Mundo. was released in the USA on September 25, 2025.

== Filmography ==
Short film

Year	Title	Director	Writer	Ref.
1995	Pie Eater	Yes	Yes	
1997	Letters at Midnight	Yes	No	

Feature film

Year	Title	Director	Writer	Ref.
2000	Chasing Sleep	Yes	Yes	
2012	Price Check	Yes	Yes	
2013	The Maid's Room	Yes	Yes	
2017	Cut Shoot Kill	Yes	Yes	
2020	Paint	Yes	Yes	
2025	The Legend of Juan Jose Mundo	Yes	Yes	

TV movie

Year	Title	Director	Writer	Executive Producer	Ref.
2018	Paint	Yes	Yes	Yes	
