= Gotham Independent Film Award for Breakthrough Director =

Annual US film award

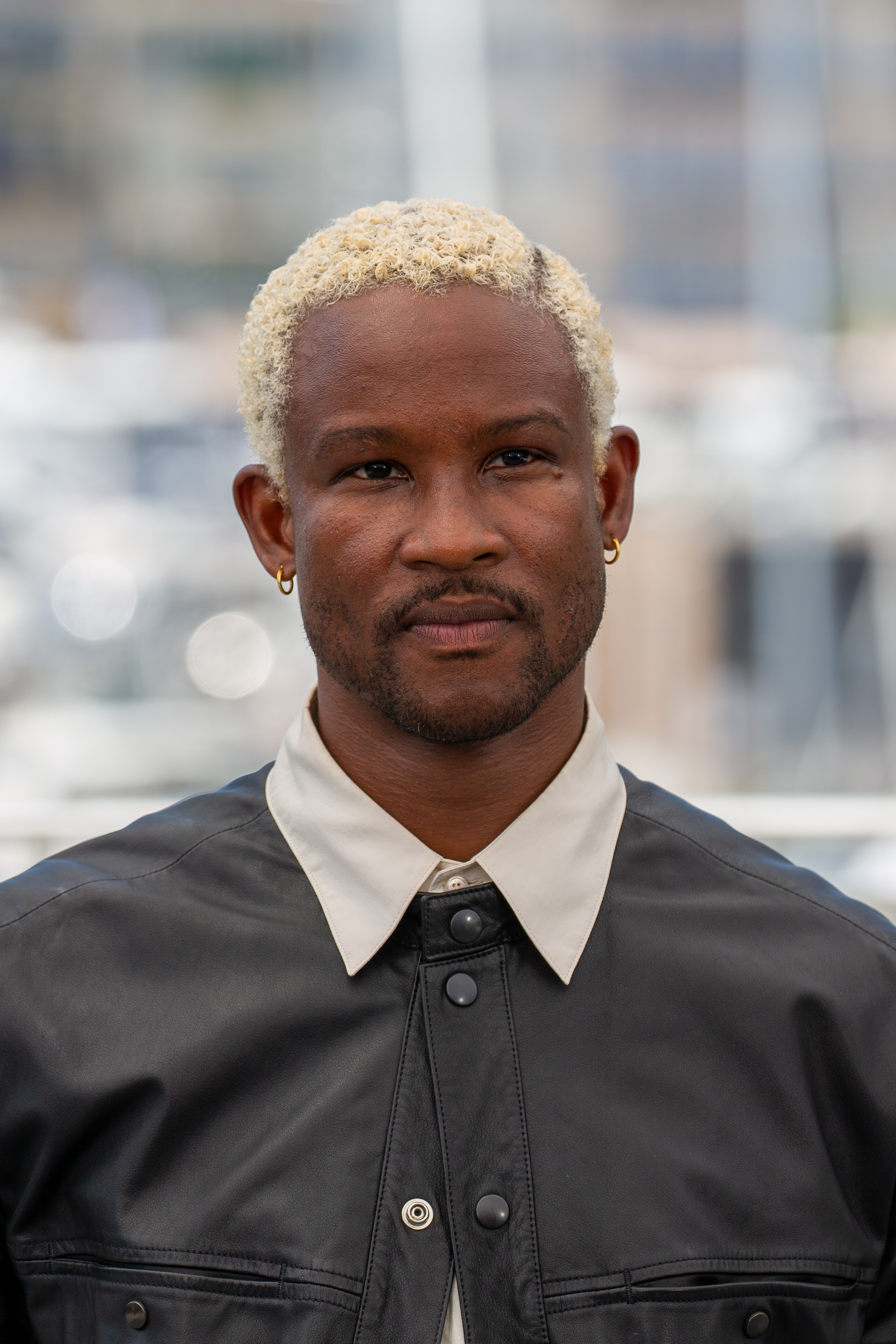
- 2025 recipient: Akinola Davies Jr.
- Country: United States
- Presented by: The Gotham Film & Media Institute
- First award: Jennie Livingston for Paris Is Burning (1991)
- Currently held by: Akinola Davies Jr. for My Father's Shadow (2025)
- Website: awards.thegotham.org

The Bingham Ray Breakthrough Director Award is one of the annual Gotham Independent Film Awards and honors feature film directorial debuts. Named after Bingham Ray since 2013, the breakthrough director award was first given in 1991 as the Open Palm Award, with Jennie Livingston being the first recipient of the award, for her work in Paris Is Burning. From 1991 to 1996 only the winner was announced, since 1997, a set of 5 to 6 nominees is presented annually.

== Winners and nominees ==
=== 1990s ===
Year	Director(s)	Film	Ref.
1991	Jennie Livingston	Paris Is Burning	
1992	Tom Kalin	Swoon	
1993	Leslie Harris	Just Another Girl on the I.R.T.	
1994	Rose Troche	Go Fish	
1995	Rebecca Miller	Angela	
1996	Lisa Krueger	Manny & Lo	
1997	Macky Alston	Family Name	
1997	Morgan J. Freeman	Hurricane Streets	
1997	John O'Hagan	Wonderland	
1997	Ira Sachs	The Delta	
1997	Alex Sichel	All Over Me	
1998	Darren Aronofsky	Pi	
1998	Lisa Cholodenko	High Art	
1998	Chris Eyre	Smoke Signals	
1998	Vincent Gallo	Buffalo '66	
1998	Harmony Korine	Gummo	
1999	David Riker	The City	
1999	Tim Kirkman	Dear Jesse	
1999	Eric Mendelsohn	Judy Berlin	
1999	Mark Polish and Michael Polish	Twin Falls Idaho	
1999	Frank Whaley	Joe the King	

=== 2000s ===
Year	Director(s)	Film	Ref.
2000	Karyn Kusama	Girlfight	
2000	Bruno de Almeida	On the Run	
2000	Myles Connell	The Opportunists	
2000	Tom Gilroy	Spring Forward	
2000	Kenneth Lonergan	You Can Count on Me	
2001	Henry Bean	The Believer	
2001	John Cameron Mitchell	Hedwig and the Angry Inch	
2001	Michael Cuesta	L.I.E.	
2001	Daniel Minahan	Series 7: The Contenders	
2001	Randy Redroad	The Doe Boy	
2001	David Wain	Wet Hot American Summer	
2002	Eric Eason	Manito	
2002	Bertha Bay-Sa Pan	Face	
2002	Ethan Hawke	Chelsea Walls	
2002	Moisés Kaufman	The Laramie Project	
2002	Peter Mattei	Love in the Time of Money	
2002	Fisher Stevens	Just a Kiss	
2003	Shari Springer Berman and Robert Pulcini	American Splendor	
2003	Alfredo De Villa	Washington Heights	
2003	Peter Hedges	Pieces of April	
2003	Dylan Kidd	Roger Dodger	
2003	Tom McCarthy	The Station Agent	
2003	Peter Sollett	Raising Victor Vargas	
2004	Joshua Marston	Maria Full of Grace	
2004	Rodney Evans	Brother to Brother	
2004	Debra Granik	Down to the Bone	
2004	Nicole Kassell	The Woodsman	
2004	Lori Silverbush and Michael Skolnik	On the Outs	
2005	Bennett Miller	Capote	
2005	Miranda July	Me and You and Everyone We Know	
2005	Phil Morrison	Junebug	
2005	Andrew Wagner	The Talent Given Us	
2005	Alice Wu	Saving Face	
2006	Ryan Fleck	Half Nelson	
2006	Ramin Bahrani	Man Push Cart	
2006	Laurie Collyer	Sherrybaby	
2006	So Yong Kim	In Between Days	
2006	James Marsh	The King	
2007	Craig Zobel	Great World of Sound	
2007	Lee Isaac Chung	Munyurangabo	
2007	Stephane Gauger	Owl and the Sparrow	
2007	Julia Loktev	Day Night Day Night	
2007	David Von Ancken	Seraphim Falls	
2008	Lance Hammer	Ballast	
2008	Antonio Campos	Afterschool	
2008	Dennis Dortch	A Good Day to Be Black and Sexy	
2008	Barry Jenkins	Medicine for Melancholy	
2008	Alex Rivera	Sleep Dealer	
2009	Robert D. Siegel	Big Fan	
2009	Cruz Angeles	Don't Let Me Drown	
2009	Frazer Bradshaw	Everything Strange and New	
2009	Noah Buschel	The Missing Person	
2009	Derick Martini	Lymelife	

=== 2010s ===
Year	Director(s)	Film	Ref.
2010	Kevin Asch	Holy Rollers	
2010	Lena Dunham	Tiny Furniture	
2010	Glenn Ficarra and John Requa	I Love You Phillip Morris	
2010	Tanya Hamilton	Night Catches Us	
2010	John Wells	The Company Men	
2011	Dee Rees	Pariah	
2011	Mike Cahill	Another Earth	
2011	Sean Durkin	Martha Marcy May Marlene	
2011	Vera Farmiga	Higher Ground	
2011	Evan Glodell	Bellflower	
2012	Benh Zeitlin	Beasts of the Southern Wild	
2012	Zal Batmanglij	Sound of My Voice	
2012	Brian M. Cassidy and Melanie Shatzky	Francine	
2012	Jason Cortlund and Julia Halperin	Now, Forager	
2012	Antonio Méndez Esparza	Aquí y allá	
2013	Ryan Coogler	Fruitvale Station	
2013	Adam Leon	Gimme the Loot	
2013	Alexandre Moors	Blue Caprice	
2013	Stacie Passon	Concussion	
2013	Amy Seimetz	Sun Don't Shine	
2014	Ana Lily Amirpour	A Girl Walks Home Alone at Night	
2014	James Ward Byrkit	Coherence	
2014	Dan Gilroy	Nightcrawler	
2014	Eliza Hittman	It Felt Like Love	
2014	Justin Simien	Dear White People	
2015	Jonas Carpignano	Mediterranea	
2015	Desiree Akhavan	Appropriate Behavior	
2015	Marielle Heller	The Diary of a Teenage Girl	
2015	John Magary	The Mend	
2015	Josh Mond	James White	
2016	Trey Edward Shults	Krisha	
2016	Robert Eggers	The Witch	
2016	Anna Rose Holmer	The Fits	
2016	Daniel Kwan and Daniel Scheinert	Swiss Army Man	
2016	Richard Tanne	Southside with You	
2017	Jordan Peele	Get Out	
2017	Maggie Betts	Novitiate	
2017	Greta Gerwig	Lady Bird	
2017	Kogonada	Columbus	
2017	Joshua Z Weinstein	Menashe	
2018	Bo Burnham	Eighth Grade	
2018	Ari Aster	Hereditary	
2018	Jennifer Fox	The Tale	
2018	Crystal Moselle	Skate Kitchen	
2018	Boots Riley	Sorry to Bother You	
2019	Laure de Clermont-Tonnerre	The Mustang	
2019	Kent Jones	Diane	
2019	Joe Talbot	The Last Black Man in San Francisco	
2019	Olivia Wilde	Booksmart	
2019	Phillip Youmans	Burning Cane	

=== 2020s ===
Year	Director(s)	Film	Ref.
2020	Andrew Patterson	The Vast of Night	
2020	Radha Blank	The Forty-Year-Old Version	
2020	Channing Godfrey Peoples	Miss Juneteenth	
2020	Carlo Mirabella-Davis	Swallow	
2020	Alex Thompson	Saint Frances	
2021	Maggie Gyllenhaal	The Lost Daughter	
2021	Shatara Michelle Ford	Test Pattern	
2021	Rebecca Hall	Passing	
2021	Edson Oda	Nine Days	
2021	Emma Seligman	Shiva Baby	
2022	Charlotte Wells	Aftersun	
2022	Elegance Bratton	The Inspection	
2022	Beth de Araújo	Soft & Quiet	
2022	Owen Kline	Funny Pages	
2022	Antoneta Alamat Kusijanović	Murina	
2022	Jane Schoenbrun	We're All Going to the World's Fair	
2023	A. V. Rockwell	A Thousand and One	
2023	Michelle Garza Cervera	Huesera: The Bone Woman	
2023	Raven Jackson	All Dirt Roads Taste of Salt	
2023	Georgia Oakley	Blue Jean	
2023	Celine Song	Past Lives	
2024	Vera Drew	The People's Joker	
2024	India Donaldson	Good One	
2024	Mahdi Fleifel	To a Land Unknown	
2024	Alessandra Lacorazza	In the Summers	
2024	Shuchi Talati	Girls Will Be Girls	
2025	Akinola Davies Jr.	My Father's Shadow	
2025	Constance Tsang	Blue Sun Palace	
2025	Carson Lund	Eephus	
2025	Sarah Friedland	Familiar Touch	
2025	Harris Dickinson	Urchin	
2026	Sophy Romvari	Blue Heron	
2026	Jordan Firstman	Club Kid	
2026	Aleshea Harris	Is God Is	
2026	Marine Atlan	La Gradiva	
2026	Joel Alfonso Vargas	Mad Bills to Pay (or Destiny, dile que no soy malo)	
2026	John Early	Maddie's Secret	

== See also ==
- John Cassavetes Award
- Independent Spirit Award for Best First Feature
