= Gotham Awards =

Independent film and series awards

- Current: Gotham Independent Film Awards 2026
- Awarded for: Independent film and television
- Location: New York City
- Country: United States
- Presented by: The Gotham Film & Media Institute
- First award: 1991; 35 years ago
- Website: awards.thegotham.org

The Gotham Awards are American film awards presented annually at a ceremony in New York City.

The awards are a program of the Gotham Film & Media Institute (formerly the Independent Filmmaker Project or IFP), the United States' largest membership organization dedicated to independent film, founded in 1979. First presented in 1991, the awards were originally created to showcase and honor films made primarily in the Northeastern United States.

== Name ==
The name "Gotham" (/ˈɡɒθəm/), a nickname for New York, was first popularized by native son Washington Irving in an 1807 issue of Salmagundi.

== Scope ==
In 2004, the awards' scope expanded significantly from a regional to a national and international focus. The number of award categories increased from six to nine, and eligibility was broadened to include films from Los Angeles, California, and international locations.

== Venue ==
Having outgrown previous venues in Manhattan, the 17th Annual Gotham Awards ceremony was held for the first time in the Brooklyn borough on November 27, 2007. The gala took place at Steiner Studios in the Brooklyn Navy Yard and was "promoted nationally via a partnership with The New York Times and locally via broadcast on WNYE."

== Categories ==
=== Current categories ===
- Tribute Award: since 1991
- Bingham Ray Breakthrough Director Award: since 1991 (formerly the Open Palm Award until 2002, and the Breakthrough Director Award from 2003 to 2012)
- Breakthrough Performer: since 1998 (known as the Award for Breakthrough Actor until 2020; not awarded in 2023)
- Best Feature: since 2004
- Best Documentary: since 2004
- Spotlight on Women Filmmakers "Live the Dream" Grant: since 2011
- Appreciation Award: since 2015
- Made in NY Award: since 2016
- Best International Feature: since 2020
- Outstanding Lead Performance: since 2021
- Outstanding Supporting Performance: since 2021
- Best Director: since 2024
- Best Original Screenplay: since 2025
- Best Adapted Screenplay: since 2025

From 1991 to 2002, the Tribute Award (also called Career Tribute) was presented as a single Lifetime Achievement Award. Individual achievement awards (e.g., Filmmaker, Writer, Actor) were given separately. Beginning with the 2003 ceremony, the IFP consolidated these individual categories into the Career Tribute awards.

=== Discontinued categories ===
- Filmmaker Award: 1991–1997
- Below-the-Line Award: 1991–1998
- Writer Award: 1991–1998
- Producer/Industry Executive Award: 1991–1999
- Actor Award: 1991–2002
- Classical Film Tribute: 1999–2000
- Anthony Radziwell Documentary Achievement Award: 2000–2002
- Independent Vision Award: 2001 only
- Celebrate New York Award: 2004–2005
- Best Ensemble Cast: 2005–2012 (known as Best Ensemble Performance from 2008)
- Best Film Not Playing At Theater Near You: 2005–2012
- Special Jury Award for Ensemble Performance: 2014–2018
- Best Actor: 2013–2020
- Best Actress: 2013–2020
- Audience Award (Film): 2010–2020
- Breakthrough Series – Long Form: 2015–2023
- Breakthrough Series – Short Form: 2015–2023
- Outstanding Performance in a New Series: 2021–2023
- Breakthrough Nonfiction Series: 2021–2022 (reintroduced in 2024 as part of the Gotham TV Awards)
- Best Screenplay: 2015–2024

== Ceremonies ==
Edition	Date	Host(s)
1st	September 30, 1991	Charles Grodin
2nd	1992	Charles Grodin
3rd	September 28, 1993	Eric Bogosian
4th	September 20, 1994	Eric Bogosian
5th	September 19, 1995	Michael Moore
6th	September 17, 1996	Michael Moore
7th	September 16, 1997	Jon Stewart
8th	September 23, 1998	Stanley Tucci
9th	September 22, 1999	Sandra Bernhard
10th	September 20, 2000	Jason Alexander
11th	October 1, 2001	Andy Dick
12th	September 26, 2002	Rosie Perez and John Turturro
13th	September 22, 2003	Michael Ian Black
14th	December 1, 2004	Bob Balaban
15th	November 30, 2005	Kyra Sedgwick
16th	November 29, 2006	David Cross
17th	November 27, 2007	Sarah Jones
18th	December 2, 2008	Aasif Mandvi
19th	November 30, 2009	Kumail Nanjiani
20th	November 29, 2010	Patricia Clarkson and Stanley Tucci
21st	November 28, 2011	Edie Falco and Oliver Platt
22nd	November 26, 2012	Mike Birbiglia
23rd	December 2, 2013	Nick Kroll
24th	December 1, 2014	Uma Thurman
25th	November 30, 2015	Abbi Jacobson and Ilana Glazer
26th	November 28, 2016	Keegan-Michael Key
27th	November 27, 2017	John Cameron Mitchell
28th	November 26, 2018	No host
29th	December 2, 2019	No host
30th	January 11, 2021	No host
31st	November 29, 2021	No host
32nd	November 28, 2022	No host
33rd	November 27, 2023	No host
34th	December 2, 2024	No host
35th	December 1, 2025	No host
36th	November 30, 2026	TBD

== Gotham TV Awards ==
Gotham TV Awards
- Current: 3rd Gotham TV Awards
- Awarded for: Television series and performances
- Location: New York City
- Country: United States
- Presented by: The Gotham Film & Media Institute
- First award: 2024; 2 years ago
- Website: televisionawards.thegotham.org

In April 2024, the Gotham Film & Media Institute announced that television series and performances would be honored at a separate ceremony going forward with the first edition of the Gotham TV Awards taking place on June 4, 2024. In previous years, television categories had been part of the main awards ceremony, where two television awards for new series were presented for the first time in 2015. In 2021, two further awards, one for performance and one for nonfiction television, were introduced. Out of the eight categories to be presented at the inaugural Gotham TV Awards, only the award for Breakthrough Nonfiction Series had been given out before (in 2021 and 2022); the three other awards for series, the three awards for outstanding performances, and the audience award for television were newly created.

== Categories ==
=== Current categories ===
- Breakthrough Comedy Series: since 2024
- Breakthrough Drama Series: since 2024
- Breakthrough Nonfiction Series: since 2021 (part of the film awards ceremony from 2021 to 2022; not awarded in 2023)
- Outstanding Limited or Anthology Series: since 2026
- Outstanding Original Film, Broadcast or Streaming: since 2025
- Outstanding Lead Performance in a Comedy Series: since 2025
- Outstanding Lead Performance in a Drama Series: since 2025
- Outstanding Lead Performance in a Limited or Anthology Series: since 2026
- Outstanding Supporting Performance in a Comedy Series: since 2025
- Outstanding Supporting Performance in a Drama Series: since 2025
- Outstanding Supporting Performance in a Limited or Anthology Series: since 2026
- Outstanding Performance in an Original Film: since 2025
- Audience Award (TV): since 2024

=== Discontinued categories ===
- Breakthrough Limited Series: 2024–2025
- Outstanding Performance in a Comedy Series: 2024
- Outstanding Performance in a Drama Series: 2024
- Outstanding Performance in a Limited Series: 2024
- Outstanding Lead Performance in a Limited Series: 2025
- Outstanding Supporting Performance in a Limited Series: 2025

=== Ceremonies ===
Edition	Date	Host
1st	June 4, 2024	No host
2nd	June 2, 2025	No host
3rd	June 1, 2026	No host

== See also ==
- List of film awards
