= Gotham Independent Film Award for Breakthrough Performer =

Annual US film award

- Country: United States
- Presented by: The Gotham Film & Media Institute
- First award: 1998
- Currently held by: Abou Sangaré for Souleymane's Story (2025)
- Website: awards.thegotham.org

The Gotham Independent Film Award for Breakthrough Performer is one of the annual Gotham Independent Film Awards. It was first awarded in 1998, with Sonja Sohn and Saul Williams being the first recipients of the award for their roles as Lauren Bell and Ray Joshua in Slam, respectively.

The category was called Gotham Independent Film Award for Breakthrough Actor until 2021.

== Winners and nominees ==
=== 1990s ===
Year	Winner and nominees	Film	Role	Ref.
1998	Sonja Sohn	Slam	Lauren Bell	
1998	Saul Williams	Slam	Ray Joshua	
1998	Norman Reedus	Six Ways to Sunday	Harold	
1998	Sam Rockwell	Lawn Dogs	Trent Burns	
1998	Robin Tunney	Niagara, Niagara	Marcy	
1999	Dylan Baker	Happiness	Bill Maplewood	
1999	Janet McTeer	Tumbleweeds	Mary Jo Walker	

=== 2000s ===
Year	Winner and nominees	Film	Role	Ref.
2000	Michelle Rodriguez	Girlfight	Diana Guzman	
2001	Yolonda Ross	Stranger Inside	Treasure	
2002	Maggie Gyllenhaal	Secretary	Lee Holloway	
2003	Lee Pace	Soldier's Girl	Calpernia Addams	
2003	Bobby Cannavale	The Station Agent	Joe Oramas	
2003	Jesse Eisenberg	Roger Dodger	Nick	
2003	Judy Marte	Raising Victor Vargas	Judy	
2003	Victor Rasuk	Raising Victor Vargas	Victor	
2003	Paul Schneider	All the Real Girls	Paul	
2004	Catalina Sandino Moreno	Maria Full of Grace	Maria Álvarez	
2004	Mos Def	The Woodsman	Lucas	
2004	Ensemble Cast	Everyday People	Various	
2004	Anthony Mackie	Brother to Brother	Perry	
2004	Dallas Roberts	A Home at the End of the World	Jonathan Glover	
2005	Amy Adams	Junebug	Ashley Johnsten	
2005	Camilla Belle	The Ballad of Jack and Rose	Rose Slavin	
2005	Joseph Gordon-Levitt	Mysterious Skin	Neil McCormick	
2005	Terrence Howard	Hustle & Flow	DJay	
2005	Damian Lewis	Keane	William Keane	
2006	Shareeka Epps	Half Nelson	Drey	
2006	Rinko Kikuchi	Babel	Chieko Wataya	
2006	Abigail Breslin	Little Miss Sunshine	Olive Hoover	
2006	Melinda Page Hamilton	Sleeping Dogs Lie	Amy	
2006	Channing Tatum	A Guide to Recognizing Your Saints	Antonio (young)	
2007	Elliot Page (Note: Credited as Ellen Page)	Juno	Juno MacGuff	
2007	Emile Hirsch	Into the Wild	Chris McCandless	
2007	Kene Holliday	Great World of Sound	Clarence	
2007	Jess Weixler	Teeth	Dawn O'Keefe	
2007	Luisa Williams	Day Night Day Night	She	
2008	Melissa Leo	Frozen River	Ray Eddy	
2008	Pedro Castaneda	August Evening	Jaime	
2008	Rosemarie DeWitt	Rachel Getting Married	Rachel Buchman	
2008	Rebecca Hall	Vicky Cristina Barcelona	Vicky	
2008	Alejandro Polanco	Chop Shop	Alejandro "Ale"	
2008	Micheal J. Smith Sr.	Ballast	Lawrence	
2009	Catalina Saavedra	The Maid	Raquel	
2009	Ben Foster	The Messenger	SSgt. Will Montgomery	
2009	Patton Oswalt	Big Fan	Paul Aufiero	
2009	Jeremy Renner	The Hurt Locker	Sergeant First Class William James	
2009	Souléymane Sy Savané	Goodbye Solo	Solo	

=== 2010s ===
Year	Winner and nominees	Film	Role	Ref.
2010	Ronald Bronstein	Daddy Longlegs	Lenny Sokol	
2010	Prince Adu	Prince of Broadway	Lucky	
2010	Greta Gerwig	Greenberg	Florence Marr	
2010	Jennifer Lawrence	Winter's Bone	Ree Dolly	
2010	John Ortiz	Jack Goes Boating	Clyde	
2011	Felicity Jones	Like Crazy	Anna Maria Gardner	
2011	Elizabeth Olsen	Martha Marcy May Marlene	Martha/Marcy May/"Marlene Lewis"	
2011	Harmony Santana	Gun Hill Road	Michael/Vanessa	
2011	Shailene Woodley	The Descendants	Alexandra "Alex" King	
2011	Jacob Wysocki	Terri	Terri Thompson	
2012	Emayatzy Corinealdi	Middle of Nowhere	Ruby	
2012	Mike Birbiglia	Sleepwalk with Me	Matt Pandamiglio	
2012	Thure Lindhardt	Keep the Lights On	Erik Rothman	
2012	Melanie Lynskey	Hello I Must Be Going	Amy	
2012	Quvenzhané Wallis	Beasts of the Southern Wild	Hushpuppy	
2013	Michael B. Jordan	Fruitvale Station	Oscar Grant III	
2013	Dane DeHaan	Kill Your Darlings	Lucien Carr	
2013	Kathryn Hahn	Afternoon Delight	Rachel	
2013	Lupita Nyong'o	12 Years a Slave	Patsey	
2013	Robin Weigert	Concussion	Abby Ableman / Eleanor	
2014	Tessa Thompson	Dear White People	Samantha "Sam" White	
2014	Riz Ahmed	Nightcrawler	Rick	
2014	Macon Blair	Blue Ruin	Dwight Evans	
2014	Ellar Coltrane	Boyhood	Mason Evans Jr.	
2014	Joey King	Wish I Was Here	Grace Bloom	
2014	Jenny Slate	Obvious Child	Donna Stern	
2015	Mya Taylor	Tangerine	Alexandra	
2015	Rory Culkin	Gabriel	Gabriel	
2015	Arielle Holmes	Heaven Knows What	Harley	
2015	Lola Kirke	Mistress America	Tracy Fishko	
2015	Kitana Kiki Rodriguez	Tangerine	Sin-Dee Rella	
2016	Anya Taylor-Joy	The Witch	Thomasin	
2016	Lily Gladstone	Certain Women	Jamie	
2016	Lucas Hedges	Manchester by the Sea	Patrick Chandler	
2016	Royalty Hightower	The Fits	Toni	
2016	Sasha Lane	American Honey	Star	
2017	Timothée Chalamet	Call Me by Your Name	Elio Perlman	
2017	Mary J. Blige	Mudbound	Florence Jackson	
2017	Harris Dickinson	Beach Rats	Frankie	
2017	Kelvin Harrison Jr.	It Comes at Night	Travis	
2017	Brooklynn Prince	The Florida Project	Moonee	
2018	Elsie Fisher	Eighth Grade	Kayla Day	
2018	Yalitza Aparicio	Roma	Cleodegaria "Cleo" Gutiérrez	
2018	Helena Howard	Madeline's Madeline	Madeline	
2018	KiKi Layne	If Beale Street Could Talk	Clementine "Tish" Rivers	
2018	Thomasin McKenzie	Leave No Trace	Tom	
2019	Taylor Russell	Waves	Emily Williams	
2019	Julia Fox	Uncut Gems	Julia Holmes	
2019	Aisling Franciosi	The Nightingale	Clare Carroll	
2019	Chris Galust	Give Me Liberty	Vic	
2019	Noah Jupe	Honey Boy	Young Otis Lort	
2019	Jonathan Majors	The Last Black Man in San Francisco	Montgomery Allen	

=== 2020s ===
Year	Winner and nominees	Film	Role	Ref.
2020	Kingsley Ben-Adir	One Night in Miami...	Malcolm X	
2020	Jasmine Batchelor	The Surrogate	Jess Harris	
2020	Sidney Flanigan	Never Rarely Sometimes Always	Autumn Callahan	
2020	Orion Lee	First Cow	King-Lu	
2020	Kelly O'Sullivan	Saint Frances	Bridget	
2021	Emilia Jones	CODA	Ruby Rossi	
2021	Natalie Morales	Language Lessons	Cariño	
2021	Rachel Sennott	Shiva Baby	Danielle	
2021	Suzanna Son	Red Rocket	Strawberry	
2021	Amalia Ulman	El Planeta	Leonor Jimenez	
2022	Gracija Filipović	Murina	Julija	
2022	Anna Cobb	We're All Going to the World's Fair	Casey	
2022	Frankie Corio	Aftersun	Sophie	
2022	Anna Diop	Nanny	Aisha	
2022	Kali Reis	Catch the Fair One	Kaylee	
2023	Not awarded			
2024	Brandon Wilson	Nickel Boys	Turner	
2024	Lily Collias	Good One	Sam	
2024	Ryan Destiny	The Fire Inside	Claressa "T-Rex" Shields	
2024	Maisy Stella	My Old Ass	Elliott	
2024	Izaac Wang	Dìdi	Chris Wang	
2025	Abou Sangaré	Souleymane's Story	Souleymane	
2025	ASAP Rocky	Highest 2 Lowest	Archie/Yung Felon	
2025	Sebiye Behtiyar	Preparation for the Next Life	Aishe	
2025	Chase Infiniti	One Battle After Another	Willa Ferguson / Charlene Calhoun	
2025	Tonatiuh	Kiss of the Spider Woman	Luis Molina/Kendall Nesbitt	
2026	Adia	Your Mother Your Mother Your Mother	Fatiha	
2026	India Amarteifio	Clarissa	Young Clarissa	
2026	Guitarricadelafuente	La bola negra	Sebastián	
2026	Colas Quignard	La Gradiva	Toni	
2026	Mason Reeves	Josephine	Josephine	
