= Hurricane Streets =

1997 film directed by Morgan J. Freeman

- Theatrical release poster
- Directed by: Morgan J. Freeman
- Written by: Morgan J. Freeman
- Produced by: Morgan J. Freeman; Gill Holland; Galt Niederhoffer
- Starring: Brendan Sexton III; Shawn Elliot; L. M. Kit Carson; Edie Falco
- Cinematography: Enrique Chediak
- Edited by: Sabine Hoffmann
- Music by: Theodore Shapiro
- Distributed by: United Artists (through MGM Distribution Co.)
- Release dates: January 21, 1997 (Sundance); February 13, 1998 (United States)
- Running time: 86 minutes
- Country: United States
- Language: English
- Box office: $375,634

Hurricane Streets (also known as Hurricane) is a 1997 American coming-of-age drama film directed and written by Morgan J. Freeman in his feature directorial debut. It stars Brendan Sexton III, Shawn Elliot, L. M. Kit Carson, and Edie Falco. The film tells the story of Marcus, a New York City street teenager who is conflicted between running with a gang who want to move up in more serious crimes and a girl he meets who tries to steer him clear from a potential life in prison.

At the 1997 Sundance Film Festival, the film won the Audience Award, Best Director Award, and Best Cinematography Award, making it the first film to ever win three awards at the festival. It was released by United Artists.

There was also a soundtrack for this film featuring the song Sex and Candy by Marcy Playground released on Mammoth Records

== Plot ==
14-year-old Marcus Frederick resides in Manhattan's Lower East Side with his grandmother, Lucy. His mother Joanna has spent the last nine years of Marcus's life in prison for smuggling undocumented people into New Mexico, while his father presumably died in a car accident when Marcus was five. Lucy owns and operates her own bar called Lucy's, which gives Marcus a lot of unsupervised time to spend with his four friends Chip, Benny, Louis, and Harold. The group spends their time committing petty theft and hanging around in their underground clubhouse near the waterfront. Chip has grown tired of the small-time crime and wants to move into more serious theft, such as robbery. Meanwhile, Marcus has aspirations to move back to his home state of New Mexico and live on a ranch with his uncle Billy, who had promised to mail Marcus an airplane ticket.

While selling stolen merchandise to elementary school children one day, Marcus meets 14-year-old Melena. Marcus invites Melena to his fifteenth birthday party, but she declines because her father Paco, an abusive tow truck driver, doesn't approve of her staying out late. That night, Melena sneaks out of her apartment and meets Marcus in front of the bar where she gives him her ski mask as a gift before leaving.

The next morning, Marcus receives a flight ticket to New Mexico in the mail and relays this information to Lucy. Unbeknownst to Marcus, the ticket was actually sent by Mack, a regular patron at the bar who believes it would do Marcus well if he left the city.

Marcus, Benny, and Louis are subsequently introduced to Justin and Shane, Chip's drug-dealing friends from Miami. Marcus tells Melena about his plans to move to New Mexico and asks her to join him, but she turns it down because she knows her father would never approve and she is not able to afford the ticket.

When Marcus is hauled to the police station for continuing to sell stolen goods, he learns from a detective named Hank that his mother is actually in prison for murder, not smuggling undocumented immigrants like she had told him. Marcus visits Joanna and tells her about Melena and his plans to travel to New Mexico. When Marcus confides that he knows she's in prison for murder, Joanna explains that his father was abusive towards her and young Marcus and she didn't know how to tell her son without upsetting him. She also discloses her parole hearing isn't until another four years, but promises Marcus they will go to New Mexico once she is out.

Marcus' friends plan on breaking into a policeman's apartment and stealing his valuables, but Marcus refuses to get involved after his run-in with the police. Paco drives to the group's clubhouse where Melena and Marcus congregate regularly. Paco finds the pair and harshly disciplines Melena before leaving with her. A vengeful Marcus rides his bicycle to Melena's apartment and knocks Paco out cold.

Marcus and Melena run away and camp out in a tent for the day. They plan to meet at Penn Station at noon the next day to catch the train after Melena agrees to travel to New Mexico with him. In order to procure the money for the train fare, Marcus joins his friends in the robbery plot. Meanwhile, in his search for Melena, Paco sneaks back to the clubhouse. When he hears the group approaching, he hides in the closet.

When Chip insults Harold's ability to play darts, Harold pulls out a stolen gun and jokingly shoots the target on the dartboard to show off. Unknowingly, Harold has shot and killed Paco, whose body falls from the closet. Marcus takes the keys to Paco's tow truck and uses the crane to lift and release Paco's body into a shallow grave. Harold's guilt prompts Marcus' fears that he may go to the police.

On the day Marcus and Melena are supposed to leave New York, Marcus visits the ruins of a building where he keeps a hidden stash of money, only to find that it is missing, along with the loot from the robbery. While Marcus is riding his bicycle downtown, he sees Chip showing off a brand new Diamondback bicycle to a crowd of onlookers. Marcus punches him in the face, accusing Chip of stealing the robbery loot and his money stash to pay for the bike. Justin and Shane accost Marcus before the former reveals he is the one who stole the money, not Chip. Justin, Shane, and Chip then mercilessly beat Marcus to the ground before leaving.

Marcus returns to the clubhouse and takes the gun before noticing an unmarked car and a police cruiser pull up. It is revealed that Benny reported Paco's murder to the police. Two police officers question Lucy on Marcus's whereabouts. Soon after, Chip is arrested by police. Running out of time and desperate for cash, Marcus enters a convenience store and robs the cashier, Duane, at gunpoint. Marcus races to Penn Station where he reunites with Melena. The two board the train and Melena, not knowing her father is dead, remarks that her dad is going to kill her when he finds out she has left. Marcus, knowing the truth about her father, doesn't respond.

== Cast ==
- Brendan Sexton III as Marcus Frederick
- Antoine McLean as Harold
- Mtume Gant as Louis
- Carlo Alban as Benny
- David Roland Frank as Chip
- Isidra Vega as Melena
- Adrian Grenier as Punk
- Lynn Cohen as Lucy
- L.M. Kit Carson as Mack
- David Moscow as Shane
- Damian Corrente as Justin
- Shawn Elliott as Paco
- Jose Zuniga as Kramer
- Edie Falco as Joanna
- Terry Alexander as Duane
- Heather Matarazzo as Ashley

== Production ==
Morgan J. Freeman wrote Hurricane Streets with Brendan Sexton III in mind after working as a second assistant director on Welcome to the Dollhouse, which starred Sexton. The film, which was originally just titled Hurricane, was shot over a period of five weeks beginning on July 23, 1996. Brooklyn's Williamsburg section was a stand-in for the East Village.

== Critical reception ==
On review aggregate website Rotten Tomatoes, Hurricane Streets has an approval rating of 87% based on 14 reviews.

Marc Savlov of The Austin Chronicle gave the film 4 and a half stars out of 5, commenting "If Truffaut had set The 400 Blows in the mean streets of New York's Lower East Side, it might have ended up looking something like this. Freeman's noirish tale of edgy inner-city youth and the problematic stepping stones a young man encounters in his effort to do the right thing is a genuinely affecting piece of NYC realism; it's a cinema vérité take on a Bowery childhood."

Stephen Holden of The New York Times wrote the film "is a wildly uneven drama of aimless street youth roaming through Manhattan's Lower East Side. When it hits the bull's-eye, it reminds you of how most adolescents are at the mercy of their environments and dependent on whatever peer groups are available for a tenuous sense of identity." He added the movie "is much better at evoking the texture and mood of its characters' lives than at telling a story". Though he critiqued the film’s use of melodrama, he commended Sexton’s performance, saying he "embodies adolescent vulnerability and defiance with a scary naturalness".

== Accolades ==
At the 1997 Sundance Film Festival, Hurricane Streets won three awards—the Audience Award for Morgan J. Freeman (in a tie with love jones), the Cinematography Award for Enrique Chediak, and the Directing Award for Freeman. In addition, Freeman was nominated for the Open Palm Award at the 1997 Gotham Awards. Producer Gill Holland was nominated for a Producers Award at the 1999 Independent Spirit Awards for his work on this film and Spring Forward.
