= Gotham Independent Film Awards 2003 =

Annual US film awards ceremony

13th Annual Gotham Independent Film Awards
- Date: September 22, 2003
- Country: United States
- Presented by: Independent Filmmaker Project
- Hosted by: Michael Ian Black

Highlights
- Most nominations: Raising Victor Vargas (3)
- Breakthrough Director: Shari Springer Berman and Robert Pulcini – American Splendor
- Website: https://gotham.ifp.org

The 13th Annual Gotham Independent Film Awards, presented by the Independent Filmmaker Project, were held on September 22, 2003. The ceremony was hosted by Michael Ian Black. It was the first Gotham Awards ceremony where the individual awards such as the Filmmaker Award were replaced with Career Tributes resulting in several Tributes each year instead of one.

== Winners and nominees ==
Breakthrough Director: Shari Springer Berman and Robert Pulcini – American Splendor; Alfredo De Villa – Washington Heights; Peter Hedges – Pieces of April; Dylan Kidd – Roger Dodger; Tom McCarthy – The Station Agent; Peter Sollett – Raising Victor Vargas	Breakthrough Actor: Lee Pace – Soldier's Girl as Calpernia Addams; Bobby Cannavale – The Station Agent as Joe Oramas; Jesse Eisenberg – Roger Dodger as Nick; Judy Marte – Raising Victor Vargas as Judy; Victor Rasuk – Raising Victor Vargas as Victor; Paul Schneider – All the Real Girls as Paul

=== Career Tributes ===
- Steve Buscemi
- Glenn Close
- David Linde
- Edward R. Pressman
