= Angela (1995 film) =

1995 drama film by Rebecca Miller

- DVD cover
- Directed by: Rebecca Miller
- Written by: Rebecca Miller
- Produced by: Ron Kastner
- Starring: John Ventimiglia; Anna Thomson; Miranda Stuart Rhyne; Vincent Gallo
- Cinematography: Ellen Kuras
- Edited by: Melody London
- Music by: Michael Rohatyn
- Production company: Tree Farm Productions
- Release dates: January 20, 1995 (Sundance); January 26, 1996 (United States)
- Running time: 99 minutes
- Country: United States
- Language: English

Angela is a 1995 American drama film directed by Rebecca Miller and starring John Ventimiglia, Anna Thomson, Miranda Stuart Rhyne and Vincent Gallo. The film, Miller's directorial debut, won awards at the Sundance Film Festival, the Brussels International Fantastic Film Festival and the Gotham Awards. It premiered at the 1995 Sundance Film Festival and was given a limited release on January 26, 1996.

== Plot ==
Angela is a 10-year-old girl trying to cope with a dysfunctional family and is on a quest to 'purify' herself. Her parents, Mae and Andrew, are former musicians who have resigned themselves to the loss of their dreams. They are now having problems in their relationship. Mae has drastic mood shifts that bring her from manic happiness to utter misery. Andrew tries to hold everyone together, but Mae's vacillations are becoming more than he can manage.

Angela tries to cope by inventing an imaginary universe of 'order' for herself and her 6-year-old sister, Ellie. Left to figure out everything for themselves, she grabs at scraps of religion, superstition, and fantasy to try to make some sense out of the world and understand the difference between good and evil.

She and Ellie concoct magical rituals and have visions of fallen angels and the Virgin Mary; reading signs in the way a towel falls off a chair or a tool falls off a truck, they set off to find their way to heaven. They wander through the neighborhood, meet a lot of strange people, and try to find a way to absolve themselves of whatever sins they may have committed, and 'go to heaven'.

At first, the stories that Angela tells Ellie are mainly meant to scare her into submission. But as time goes on, and her mother succumbs to mental illness, Angela becomes obsessed with the idea that the only way her mother is going to get better is if she and her sister can wash away all of their sins.

At the end of the film, Angela takes Ellie to the river to be baptized, but drowns after being washed away with the current. Ellie is left standing alone, only to begin rising up from the river in a pose reminiscent of an angel.

== Cast ==
- John Ventimiglia as Andrew
- Anna Thomson as Mae
- Miranda Stuart Rhyne as Angela
- Charlotte Blythe as Ellie
- Vincent Gallo as Preacher
- Peter Facinelli as Lucifer
- Hynden Walch as Darlene
- Caitlin Hall as Anne
- Frances Conroy as Anne's mother

== Reception ==
Stephen Holden of The New York Times wrote Angela is a film that "is at its best when looking at the world through Angela's eyes before she has gone numb. Its early scenes beautifully capture a childhood intuition of a world where bogeymen lurk and angels hover. On a more somber note, the film is an almost clinical study of how children absorb their parents' psychology." Holden praised the "strong, unself-conscious performances" of the lead child actors as well as of the supporting cast.

John Anderson of the Los Angeles Times praised the cinematography and said, "What Miller is showing us are the roots of religion in fear and ignorance: Angela, visibly angry at her life and deprived of an enemy, devises ways of fending off Satan." Though he said one of the film’s weaknesses is its tendency to be vague, "Miller keeps [the audience] white-knuckled".

On review aggregator website Rotten Tomatoes, the film holds an approval rating of 60% based on 5 reviews.

== Accolades ==
- 1995 Sundance Film Festival
  - Filmmakers Trophy, Dramatic - Rebecca Miller (won)
  - Cinematography Award, Dramatic - Ellen Kuras (won)
  - Grand Jury Prize, Dramatic - Rebecca Miller (nominated)
- 1995 Gotham Awards
  - Open Palm Award for Breakthrough Director - Rebecca Miller (won)
- 1996 Brussels International Fantastic Film Festival
  - Silver Raven Award - Rebecca Miller (won)
