= Thelma Schoonmaker =

American film editor (born 1940)

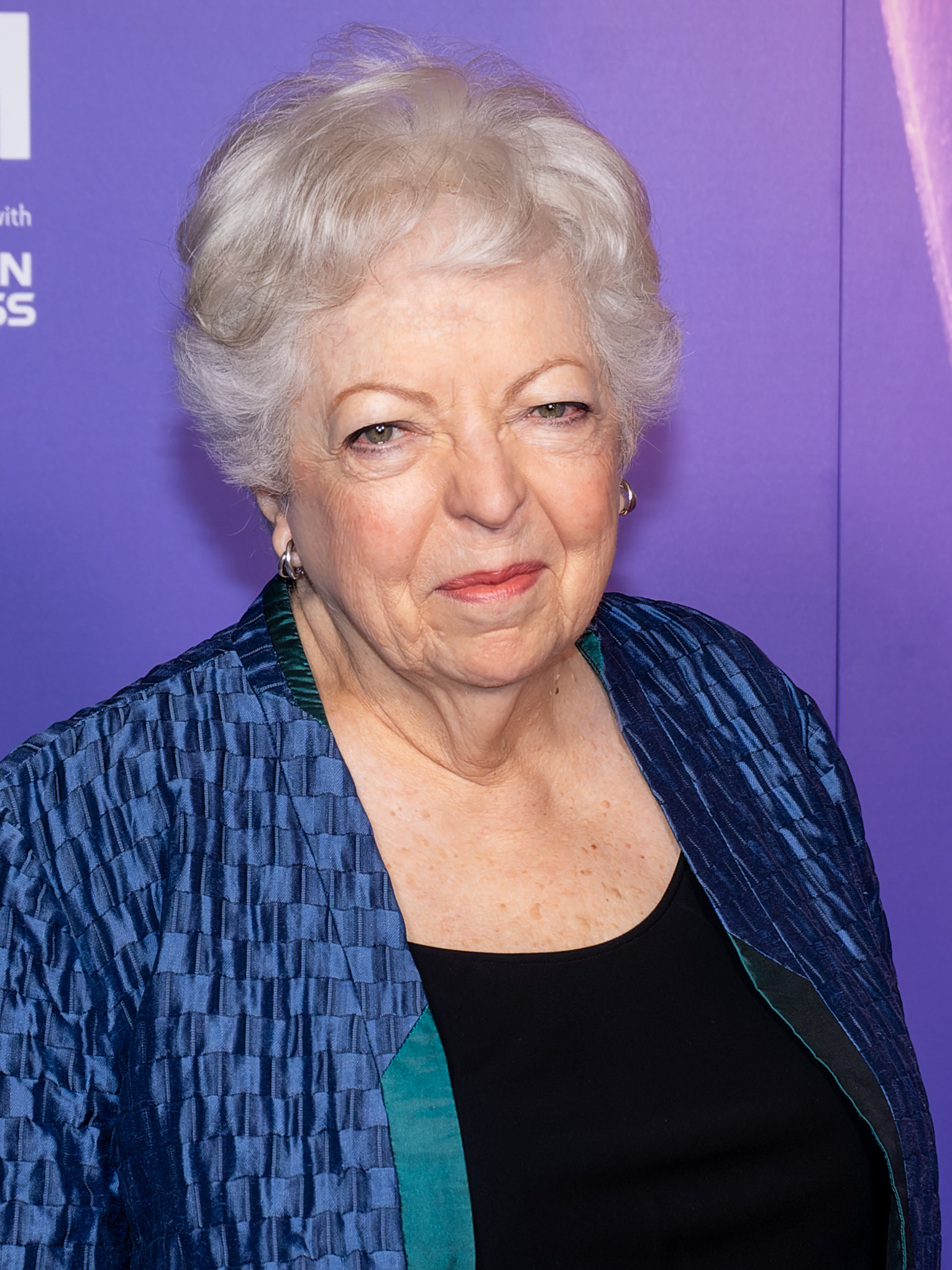
- Schoonmaker in 2023
- Born: Thelma Colbert Schoonmaker; January 3, 1940 (age 86); Algiers, French Algeria
- Education: Cornell University
- Occupation: Film editor
- Years active: 1966–present
- Spouse: Michael Powell (m. 1984; died 1990)

Thelma Schoonmaker (/ˈskuːnmeɪkər/; born January 3, 1940) is an American film editor, best known for her collaboration over five decades with director Martin Scorsese. She has received numerous accolades, including three Academy Awards, two BAFTA Awards, and four ACE Eddie Awards. She has been honored with the British Film Institute Fellowship in 1997, the Golden Lion for Lifetime Achievement in 2014, and the BAFTA Fellowship in 2019.

Schoonmaker started working with Scorsese on his debut feature film, Who's That Knocking at My Door (1967), and has edited all of his films since Raging Bull (1980). She has received a record nine nominations for the Academy Award for Best Film Editing and has won a record three times for Raging Bull, The Aviator (2004), and The Departed (2006). She has also been nominated for the BAFTA Award for Best Editing a record 11 times, winning twice for Raging Bull and Goodfellas (1990).

== Early life ==
Thelma Schoonmaker was born on January 3, 1940, in Algiers (then part of French Algeria), the daughter of American parents, Thelma and Bertram Schoonmaker. Bertram, descended from the New York Dutch Schoonmaker political family, was employed as an agent of the Standard Oil Company and worked extensively abroad. The Schoonmakers were evacuated to the United States shortly after the Fall of France during the Second World War. In 1941, the family moved to the Dutch-Caribbean island of Aruba, where Schoonmaker's father continued to work for Standard Oil and her mother ran nursery schools. Schoonmaker was primarily raised in Aruba, in a community she described as "a colony of expatriates from over the world"; she also spent part of her childhood in Portugal.

Schoonmaker did not live in the United States until she was an adolescent in 1955, and was initially alienated and dumbfounded by American culture. She settled in Ridgewood, New Jersey, and graduated in 1957 from Ridgewood High School. Schoonmaker was interested in a career in international diplomacy and began attending Cornell University in 1957, where she studied political science and the Russian language. When she graduated from Cornell in 1961, she began taking State Department tests in order to apply for positions within the U.S. government. Politically inclined and opinionated, Schoonmaker was opposed to the Vietnam War and supported the civil rights movement. She passed the State Department exams but failed the final "stress test" when she expressed distaste for the South African policy of apartheid, a stance which did not sit well with those administering the tests. Schoonmaker later said that the State Department claimed that her views were "too politically liberal" and that she wouldn't be happy having a job at the Department.

== Career ==
You get to contribute so significantly in the editing room because you shape the movie and the performances. You help the director bring all the hard work of those who made the film to fruition. You give their work rhythm and pace and sometimes adjust the structure to make the film work – to make it start to flow up there on the screen. And then it's very rewarding after a year's work to see people react to what you've done in the theater.

— Thelma Schoonmaker, on editing

While taking a graduate course in primitive art at Columbia University, Schoonmaker saw an advertisement in The New York Times that offered training as an assistant film editor. She responded to the advertisement and got the job. The job entailed assisting an "editor" who was randomly cutting frames from classic European films (such as those by Truffaut, Godard and Fellini), so that their length would conform to the running times of U.S. television broadcasts.

She signed up for a brief six-week course in filmmaking at New York University, where she came into contact with young Martin Scorsese, who was struggling to complete his short film What's a Nice Girl Like You Doing in a Place Like This?. A negative cutter had butchered the film, not leaving enough negative frames to allow for hot splicing, so a film professor asked Schoonmaker to help Scorsese. Schoonmaker went on to edit Scorsese's feature directorial debut, Who's That Knocking at My Door (1967).

Schoonmaker received her first major screen credits when she and Scorsese both became part of the editing team on Michael Wadleigh's seminal music festival documentary, 1970's Woodstock. She received an Oscar nomination for Best Film Editing for her groundbreaking work—the first documentary ever to be nominated in that category. Her use of superimpositions and freeze frames brought the performances in the film to life and added to the movie's broad appeal, thus helping to raise the artistry and visibility of documentary film-making to a new level.

The early period of Schoonmaker's career was difficult. Despite being an Oscar nominee, Schoonmaker could not work on feature films unless she became a member of the Motion Picture Editors Guild. The union's entry requirements included spending five years as an apprentice and three as an assistant, which Schoonmaker was unwilling to meet. Schoonmaker remarked, "And I just couldn't see why I, who had been a full editor and had been nominated for an Academy Award, should suddenly have to become an apprentice. ...And of course, they couldn't see the sense of why I, who had never been in the union all those years and had never paid dues all those years and had never served my time in their sense, should be allowed as a full editor. So it was quite understandable on both sides. It was just insane."

Consequently, Schoonmaker did not work with Scorsese in a formal capacity in the 1970s; however, she did make an uncredited contribution to Taxi Driver. Scorsese had decided not to edit the picture during principal photography, but to save all the editing until shooting had wrapped. Unfortunately, this left him very little time to cut the picture, as Columbia's contract stipulated that a finished cut had to be supplied by the middle of February. Scorsese brought in Schoonmaker to help. At one point, Steven Spielberg visited Scorsese and chipped in with some contributions toward the final edit.

In the 1980s, Schoonmaker, with some help from Scorsese, was eventually accepted into the union. They worked together on the classic sports drama Raging Bull, which is widely considered masterful editing and won her the Best Film Editing Oscar. During her acceptance speech for the film, Schoonmaker said "I want to thank, first of all, Marty Scorsese; he edited this film with me every minute of the time. I want to thank him particularly for his brilliant direction, and Robert De Niro for his incredible performance which gave me gold to work with — pure gold." Schoonmaker has edited every subsequent narrative film directed by Scorsese, winning two further Oscars for The Aviator (2004) and The Departed (2006).

== Personal life ==
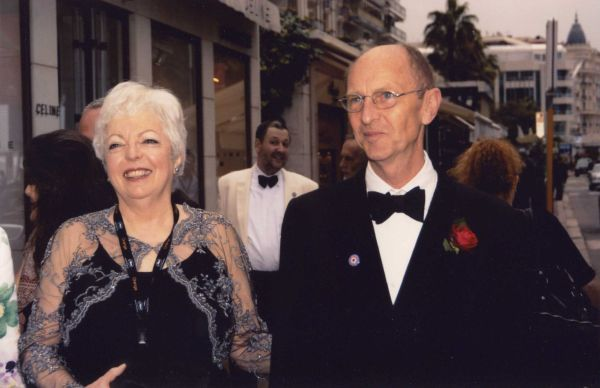
Thelma Schoonmaker and Columba Powell at the Cannes Film Festival (2009). Columba Powell is the son of Michael Powell, a prominent film director to whom Schoonmaker was married.

She was introduced to Michael Powell by Scorsese and London-based film producer Frixos Constantine. The couple were married from May 19, 1984, until his death in 1990. The couple had no children. She has cited Buddhist concepts, particularly the mandala—the creation and dissolution of an artwork—as an influence on her work.

Since Powell's death, Schoonmaker has dedicated herself to preserving the films and honoring the legacy of her husband, who directed many classic films with his partner, Emeric Pressburger. In an interview with A.Frame asking Schoonmaker what her five favorite films of all time are, she listed two of their films, The Red Shoes and The Life and Death of Colonel Blimp. (The others were Faces, The Flowers of St. Francis and Raging Bull).

== Filmography ==
=== Film ===
Year	Title	Director(s)	Notes
1967	Who's That Knocking at My Door	Martin Scorsese	
1968	The Virgin President	Graeme Ferguson	Co-edited with Mark Rappaport and Burt Rashby
1970	Woodstock	Michael Wadleigh	Documentary; Assistant director & editor Co-edited with Michael Wadleigh, Martin Scorsese, Stan Warnow, Yeu-Bun Yee, and Jere Huggins
1970	Street Scenes 1970	Martin Scorsese	Documentary short film
1979	The Kids Are Alright	Jeff Stein	Rockumentary; Special consultant
1980	Raging Bull	Martin Scorsese	
1982	The King of Comedy	Martin Scorsese	
1985	After Hours	Martin Scorsese	
1986	The Color of Money	Martin Scorsese	
1987	Michael Jackson: Bad	Martin Scorsese	Short film and music video by Michael Jackson
1988	The Last Temptation of Christ	Martin Scorsese	
1989	New York Stories	Martin Scorsese	Segment: "Life Lessons"
1990	Made in Milan	Martin Scorsese	Documentary short film
1990	Goodfellas	Martin Scorsese	
1991	Cape Fear	Martin Scorsese	
1993	The Age of Innocence	Martin Scorsese	
1995	A Personal Journey with Martin Scorsese Through American Movies	Martin Scorsese; Michael Henry Wilson	Documentary; Supervising editor
1995	Casino	Martin Scorsese	
1996	Grace of My Heart	Allison Anders	Co-edited with James Y. Kwei and Harvey Rosenstock
1997	Kundun	Martin Scorsese	
1999	My Voyage to Italy	Martin Scorsese	Documentary
1999	Bringing Out the Dead	Martin Scorsese	
2002	Gangs of New York	Martin Scorsese	
2004	The Aviator	Martin Scorsese	
2006	The Departed	Martin Scorsese	
2007	The Key to Reserva	Martin Scorsese	Short film and long-form advertisement for Freixenet
2010	Shutter Island	Martin Scorsese	
2011	Hugo	Martin Scorsese	
2013	The Wolf of Wall Street	Martin Scorsese	
2014	Learning to Drive	Isabel Coixet	Co-edited with Keith Reamer
2015	Bombay Velvet	Anurag Kashyap	Co-edited with Prerna Saigal
2016	Letters from Baghdad	Sabine Krayenbühl; Zeva Oelbaum	Documentary; Executive producer
2016	Silence	Martin Scorsese	
2017	The Snowman	Tomas Alfredson	Co-edited with Claire Simpson
2019	The Irishman	Martin Scorsese	
2023	Killers of the Flower Moon	Martin Scorsese	
2024	Made in England: The Films of Powell and Pressburger	David Hinton	Documentary; Executive producer
TBA	What Happens at Night	Martin Scorsese	

=== Television ===
Year	Title	Notes
1979	Wings Over the World	Television documentary Co-edited with Robin Clarke and Paul Stein
2003	AFI Life Achievement Award: A Tribute to Robert De Niro	Television special Co-edited with Debra Light, Adam "Chip" Pauken, Mike Polito, Ryan Polito, Martin Scorsese, and Yoram Inon Tal
2010	Boardwalk Empire	Consultant; Episode: "Boardwalk Empire"
2020	The Right Stuff	Consulting producer; 2 episodes

== Achievements and recognition ==
Schoonmaker equaled the record for the most Oscar wins (three) in the Best Film Editing category, shared with Ralph Dawson, Daniel Mandell, and Michael Kahn. Furthermore, she holds the record for most nominations in that category, with nine. Schoonmaker is also the first woman to win multiple Oscars for film editing.

In 2012, on the 75th anniversary of its founding, the Motion Picture Editors Guild issued a list of the 75 best-edited films of all time based on a survey of its membership. Three films edited by Schoonmaker made the list—all directed by Scorsese and spanning three different decades—including Raging Bull (1980), which is ranked first; Goodfellas (1990), ranked fifteenth; and Hugo (2011), ranked sixty-ninth. Only George Tomasini, the editor of Alfred Hitchcock's films in the 1950s and 1960s, has more appearances on this list, with four; and only Dede Allen also edited three pictures across three decades, with hers in particular from the 1960s through the 1980s.

== Awards and nominations ==
=== Major associations ===
Academy Awards

Year	Category	Nominated work	Result	Ref.
1971	Best Film Editing	Woodstock	Nominated	
1981	Best Film Editing	Raging Bull	Won	
1991	Best Film Editing	Goodfellas	Nominated	
2003	Best Film Editing	Gangs of New York	Nominated	
2005	Best Film Editing	The Aviator	Won	
2007	Best Film Editing	The Departed	Won	
2012	Best Film Editing	Hugo	Nominated	
2020	Best Film Editing	The Irishman	Nominated	
2024	Best Film Editing	Killers of the Flower Moon	Nominated	

BAFTA Awards

Year	Category	Nominated work	Result	Ref.
British Academy Film Awards
1982	Best Editing	Raging Bull	Won	
1984	Best Editing	The King of Comedy	Nominated	
1991	Best Editing	Goodfellas	Won	
1993	Best Editing	Cape Fear	Nominated	
2003	Best Editing	Gangs of New York	Nominated	
2005	Best Editing	The Aviator	Nominated	
2007	Best Editing	The Departed	Nominated	
2012	Best Editing	Hugo	Nominated	
2014	Best Editing	The Wolf of Wall Street	Nominated	
2020	Best Editing	The Irishman	Nominated	
2024	Best Editing	Killers of the Flower Moon	Nominated	

Emmy Awards

Year	Category	Nominated work	Result	Ref.
Primetime Emmy Awards
2004	Outstanding Picture Editing for Variety Programming	AFI Life Achievement Award: A Tribute to Robert De Niro	Nominated	

=== Miscellaneous awards ===
List of Thelma Schoonmaker other awards and nominations
Award	Year	Category	Title	Result
Alliance of Women Film Journalists Awards	2011	Best Editing	Shutter Island	Nominated
Alliance of Women Film Journalists Awards	2012	Best Editing	Hugo	Won
Alliance of Women Film Journalists Awards	2012	Female Focus Award – Outstanding Achievement by a Woman in the Film Industry	Hugo	Nominated
Alliance of Women Film Journalists Awards	2020	Best Editing	The Irishman	Won
Alliance of Women Film Journalists Awards	2024	Best Editing	Killers of the Flower Moon	Won
American Cinema Editors Eddie Awards	1981	Best Edited Feature Film	Raging Bull	Won
American Cinema Editors Eddie Awards	1991	Best Edited Feature Film	Goodfellas	Nominated
American Cinema Editors Eddie Awards	1996	Best Edited Feature Film	Casino	Nominated
American Cinema Editors Eddie Awards	2003	Best Edited Feature Film – Dramatic	Gangs of New York	Won
American Cinema Editors Eddie Awards	2005	Best Edited Feature Film – Dramatic	The Aviator	Won
American Cinema Editors Eddie Awards	2007	Best Edited Feature Film – Dramatic	The Departed	Won (Note: Tied with Douglas Crise and Stephen Mirrione for Babel)
American Cinema Editors Eddie Awards	2012	Best Edited Feature Film – Dramatic	Hugo	Nominated
American Cinema Editors Eddie Awards	2014	Best Edited Feature Film – Comedy or Musical	The Wolf of Wall Street	Nominated
American Cinema Editors Eddie Awards	2020	Best Edited Feature Film – Dramatic	The Irishman	Nominated
American Cinema Editors Eddie Awards	2024	Best Edited Feature Film – Dramatic	Killers of the Flower Moon	Nominated
Astra Film and Creative Arts Awards	2020	Best Film Editing	The Irishman	Nominated
Astra Film and Creative Arts Awards	2024	Best Film Editing	Killers of the Flower Moon	Nominated
Austin Film Critics Association Awards	2020	Best Film Editing	The Irishman	Nominated
Austin Film Critics Association Awards	2024	Best Film Editing	Killers of the Flower Moon	Nominated
Boston Online Film Critics Association Awards	2019	Best Editing	The Irishman	Won
Boston Society of Film Critics Awards	2011	Best Editing	Hugo	Runner-up
Boston Society of Film Critics Awards	2013	Best Editing	The Wolf of Wall Street	Runner-up
Boston Society of Film Critics Awards	2019	Best Editing	The Irishman	Won
Boston Society of Film Critics Awards	2023	Best Editing	Killers of the Flower Moon	Won
Capri Hollywood International Film Festival	2020	Best Film Editing	The Irishman	Won
Chicago Film Critics Association Awards	2013	Best Editing	The Wolf of Wall Street	Nominated
Chicago Film Critics Association Awards	2019	Best Editing	The Irishman	Won
Chicago Film Critics Association Awards	2023	Best Editing	Killers of the Flower Moon	Nominated
Clio Awards	2008	Gold Clio Award (Beverages/Alcohol)	The Key to Reserva	Won
Critics' Choice Awards	2012	Best Editing	Hugo	Nominated
Critics' Choice Awards	2014	Best Editing	The Wolf of Wall Street	Nominated
Critics' Choice Awards	2020	Best Editing	The Irishman	Nominated
Critics' Choice Awards	2024	Best Editing	Killers of the Flower Moon	Nominated
DVD Exclusive Awards	2006	Best Audio Commentary (New for DVD)	The Aviator	Won
DVD Exclusive Awards	2006	Best Audio Commentary (New for DVD)	Raging Bull	Nominated
Hollywood Professional Association Awards	2012	Outstanding Editing – Feature Film	Hugo	Won
International Cinephile Society Awards	2014	Best Editing	The Wolf of Wall Street	Nominated
International Cinephile Society Awards	2017	Best Editing	Silence	Nominated
International Cinephile Society Awards	2020	Best Editing	The Irishman	Nominated
Las Vegas Film Critics Society Awards	2005	Best Film Editing	The Aviator	Won
Las Vegas Film Critics Society Awards	2006	Best Film Editing	The Departed	Won
Las Vegas Film Critics Society Awards	2010	Best Film Editing	Shutter Island	Nominated
London Film Critics' Circle Awards	2024	Technical Achievement Award	Killers of the Flower Moon	Nominated
Online Film Critics Society Awards	2005	Best Editing	The Aviator	Nominated
Online Film Critics Society Awards	2007	Best Editing	The Departed	Nominated
Online Film Critics Society Awards	2020	Best Editing	The Irishman	Nominated
Online Film Critics Society Awards	2024	Best Editing	Killers of the Flower Moon	Nominated
Phoenix Film Critics Society Awards	2006	Best Film Editing	The Departed	Won
Phoenix Film Critics Society Awards	2010	Best Film Editing	Shutter Island	Nominated
San Diego Film Critics Society Awards	2011	Best Editing	Hugo	Nominated
San Diego Film Critics Society Awards	2019	Best Editing	The Irishman	Nominated
San Diego Film Critics Society Awards	2023	Best Editing	Killers of the Flower Moon	Nominated
San Francisco Bay Area Film Critics Circle Awards	2013	Best Film Editing	The Wolf of Wall Street	Nominated
San Francisco Bay Area Film Critics Circle Awards	2019	Best Film Editing	The Irishman	Nominated
San Francisco Bay Area Film Critics Circle Awards	2024	Best Film Editing	Killers of the Flower Moon	Nominated
Satellite Awards	2003	Best Editing	Gangs of New York	Won
Satellite Awards	2005	Best Editing	The Aviator	Nominated
Satellite Awards	2010	Best Editing	Shutter Island	Nominated
Satellite Awards	2014	Best Editing	The Wolf of Wall Street	Nominated
Satellite Awards	2019	Best Editing	The Irishman	Nominated
Satellite Awards	2024	Best Editing	Killers of the Flower Moon	Nominated
Saturn Awards	2012	Best Editing	Hugo	Nominated
Seattle Film Critics Society Awards (Note: prior to the SFCS formal establishment in 2016, a group of Seattle-area critics compiled the Seattle Film Critics Awards in 2014 and 2015.)	2014	Best Film Editing	The Wolf of Wall Street	Nominated
Seattle Film Critics Society Awards	2019	Best Film Editing	The Irishman	Nominated
Seattle Film Critics Society Awards	2024	Best Film Editing	Killers of the Flower Moon	Nominated
St. Louis Film Critics Association Awards	2019	Best Editing	The Irishman	Runner-up (Note: Tied with Lee Smith for 1917)
St. Louis Film Critics Association Awards	2023	Best Editing	Killers of the Flower Moon	Nominated
Venice Film Festival	2012	Gucci Award for Women in Cinema	Hugo	Won
Washington D.C. Area Film Critics Association Awards	2013	Best Editing	The Wolf of Wall Street	Nominated
Washington D.C. Area Film Critics Association Awards	2019	Best Editing	The Irishman	Nominated
Washington D.C. Area Film Critics Association Awards	2023	Best Editing	Killers of the Flower Moon	Nominated

=== Honorary accolades ===
Organization	Year	Category	Result
American Cinema Editors	2017	Career Achievement Award	Honored
British Academy Film Awards	2019	BAFTA Fellowship	Honored
British Film Institute	1997	BFI Fellowship	Honored
Camerimage	2009	Editor with Unique Visual Sensitivity	Honored
Gotham Awards	1992	Below-the-Line Award	Honored
Hollywood Film Festival	2000	Hollywood Outstanding Achievement in Editing Award	Honored
Las Vegas Film Critics Society	2010	Lifetime Achievement Award	Honored
New York Film Critics Circle	2016	Special Award	Honored
New York Women in Film & Television	1995	Muse Award	Honored
Phoenix Critics Circle	2019	Lifetime Achievement Award	Honored
Online Film Critics Society	2024	Lifetime Achievement Award	Honored
Telluride Film Festival	2024	Silver Medallion	Honored
Venice Film Festival	2014	Golden Lion for Lifetime Achievement	Honored

=== Honorary degrees ===
Name of school, year given, and name of degree
School	Year	Degree	Ref.
Canterbury Christ Church University	2007	Honorary Fellow	

== See also ==
- List of film director and editor collaborations
