= Gotham Independent Film Awards 2013 =

Annual US film awards ceremony

23rd Annual Gotham Independent Film Awards
- Date: December 2, 2013
- Country: United States
- Presented by: Independent Filmmaker Project
- Hosted by: Nick Kroll

Highlights
- Most wins: Fruitvale Station (2)
- Most nominations: 12 Years a Slave (4)
- Best Feature: Inside Llewyn Davis
- Breakthrough Director: Ryan Coogler – Fruitvale Station
- Website: https://gotham.ifp.org

The 23rd Annual Gotham Independent Film Awards, presented by the Independent Filmmaker Project, were held on December 2, 2013. The nominees were announced on October 24, 2013. The ceremony was hosted by Nick Kroll. It is the first Gotham Awards ceremony where the awards for best actor and best actress were given out.

== Winners and nominees ==
Best Feature: Inside Llewyn Davis; 12 Years a Slave; Ain't Them Bodies Saints; Before Midnight; Upstream Color	Best Documentary Feature: The Act of Killing; The Crash Reel; First Cousin Once Removed; Let the Fire Burn; Our Nixon
Breakthrough Director: Ryan Coogler – Fruitvale Station; Adam Leon – Gimme the Loot; Alexandre Moors – Blue Caprice; Stacie Passon – Concussion; Amy Seimetz – Sun Don't Shine	Breakthrough Actor: Michael B. Jordan – Fruitvale Station as Oscar Grant III; Dane DeHaan – Kill Your Darlings as Lucien Carr; Kathryn Hahn – Afternoon Delight as Rachel; Lupita Nyong'o – 12 Years a Slave as Patsey; Robin Weigert – Concussion as Abby Ableman / Eleanor
Best Actor: Matthew McConaughey – Dallas Buyers Club as Ron Woodroof; Chiwetel Ejiofor – 12 Years a Slave as Solomon Northup; Oscar Isaac – Inside Llewyn Davis as Llewyn Davis; Robert Redford – All Is Lost as Our Man; Isaiah Washington – Blue Caprice as John Muhammad	Best Actress: Brie Larson – Short Term 12 as Grace Howard; Cate Blanchett – Blue Jasmine as Jeanette "Jasmine" Francis; Scarlett Johansson – Don Jon as Barbara Sugarman; Amy Seimetz – Upstream Color as Kris; Shailene Woodley – The Spectacular Now as Aimee Finecky
Audience Award: Jake Shimabukuro: Life on Four Strings; 12 Years a Slave; Best Kept Secret; Don't Stop Believin': Everyman's Journey; Fruitvale Station

== Special awards ==
=== Spotlight on Women Filmmakers "Live the Dream" Grant ===
- Gita Pullapilly – Beneath the Harvest Sky
  - Afia Nathaniel – Dukhtar
  - Deb Shoval – AWOL

=== Gotham Tributes ===
- James Gandolfini
- Richard Linklater
- Katherine Oliver
- Forest Whitaker
