= Gotham Independent Film Awards 2011 =

Annual US film awards ceremony

21st Annual Gotham Independent Film Awards
- Date: November 28, 2011
- Country: United States
- Presented by: Independent Filmmaker Project
- Hosted by: Edie Falco and Oliver Platt

Highlights
- Most wins: Beginners (2)
- Most nominations: The Descendants and Martha Marcy May Marlene (3)
- Best Feature: Beginners and The Tree of Life
- Breakthrough Director: Dee Rees – Pariah
- Website: https://gotham.ifp.org

The 21st Annual Gotham Independent Film Awards, presented by the Independent Filmmaker Project, were held on November 28, 2011. The nominees were announced on October 20, 2011. The ceremony was hosted by Edie Falco and Oliver Platt.

== Winners and nominees ==
Best Feature: Beginners (TIE); The Tree of Life (TIE); The Descendants; Meek's Cutoff; Take Shelter	Best Documentary Feature: Better This World; Bill Cunningham New York; Hell and Back Again; The Interrupters; The Woodmans
Breakthrough Director: Dee Rees – Pariah; Mike Cahill – Another Earth; Sean Durkin – Martha Marcy May Marlene; Vera Farmiga – Higher Ground; Evan Glodell – Bellflower	Breakthrough Actor: Felicity Jones – Like Crazy as Anna Gardner; Elizabeth Olsen – Martha Marcy May Marlene as Martha/Marcy May/"Marlene Lewis"; Harmony Santana – Gun Hill Road as Vanessa; Shailene Woodley – The Descendants as Alexandra "Alex" King; Jacob Wysocki – Terri as Terri Thompson
Audience Award: Girlfriend; Being Elmo: A Puppeteer's Journey; Buck; The First Grader; Wild Horse, Wild Ride	Best Film Not Playing at a Theater Near You: Scenes of a Crime; Codependent Lesbian Space Alien Seeks Same; Green; The Redemption of General Butt Naked; Without
Best Ensemble Performance: Beginners – Keegan Boos, Mary Page Keller, Mélanie Laurent, Kai Lennox, Ewan McGregor, Christopher Plummer, and Goran Višnjić; The Descendants – Mary Birdsong, Beau Bridges, George Clooney, Robert Forster, Judy Greer, Rob Huebel, Nick Krause, Matthew Lillard, Amara Miller, and Shailene Woodley; Margin Call – Penn Badgley, Simon Baker, Paul Bettany, Jeremy Irons, Aasif Mandvi, Mary McDonnell, Demi Moore, Zachary Quinto, Kevin Spacey, and Stanley Tucci; Martha Marcy May Marlene – Christopher Abbott, Brady Corbet, Hugh Dancy, Maria Dizzia, Julia Garner, John Hawkes, Louisa Krause, Elizabeth Olsen, and Sarah Paulson; Take Shelter – Kathy Baker, Jessica Chastain, LisaGay Hamilton, Robert Longstreet, Ray McKinnon, Katy Mixon, Michael Shannon, Tova Stewart, and Shea Whigham

== Special awards ==
=== Spotlight on Women Filmmakers "Live the Dream" Grant ===
- Lucy Mulloy – Una Noche
  - Jenny Deller – Future Weather
  - Rola Nashef – Detroit Unleaded

=== Gotham Tributes ===
- David Cronenberg
- Gary Oldman
- Tom Rothman
- Charlize Theron
