= Bingham Ray =

Bingham Ray (1 October 1954 – 23 January 2012) was an American independent film executive.

== Career ==
He was a co-founder of indie film distributor October Films and president of United Artists from 2001 to 2004. At the time of his death, he was executive director of the San Francisco Film Society.

== Legacy ==
As noted by the Independent Feature Project's Gotham Independent Film Awards, "New to the Gotham Awards this year [2012] is the Bingham Ray Award, an award bestowed upon an emerging filmmaker whose work exemplifies a distinctive creative vision and stylistic adventurousness that stands apart from the mainstream and warrants championing. The goal is to bring additional attention to new artists whose work could be seen as conceivably joining the ranks of filmmakers championed by industry veteran Bingham Ray, who died in January."

- Oden Roberts, the writer and director of A Fighting Season, was awarded the SFFS KRF grant by Ray in December 2011.
- Benh Zeitlin, director and co-writer of Beasts of the Southern Wild, was the inaugural recipient of the Bingham Ray Award.

The 39th Telluride Film Festival in 2013 was dedicated to him. The 2012 film Stand Up Guys starring Christopher Walken and Al Pacino is dedicated to him.

The 2015 feature documentary The First Film, which proves that the world's very first film was made in England by Louis Le Prince, is also dedicated to Ray.
