= Gotham Independent Film Awards 2004 =

Independent film awards ceremony

14th Annual Gotham Independent Film Awards
- Date: December 1, 2004
- Country: United States
- Presented by: Independent Filmmaker Project
- Hosted by: Bob Balaban

Highlights
- Most wins: Maria Full of Grace (2)
- Most nominations: Brother to Brother, Maria Full of Grace, and The Woodsman (2)
- Best Feature: Sideways
- Breakthrough Director: Joshua Marston – Maria Full of Grace
- Website: https://gotham.ifp.org

The 14th Annual Gotham Independent Film Awards, presented by the Independent Filmmaker Project, were held on December 1, 2004. The nominees for Breakthrough Actor and Director were announced on November 1, 2004 and the nominees in the film categories were announced on November 10, 2004. The ceremony was hosted by Bob Balaban. It was the first Gotham Award ceremony where the prizes for Best Feature and Best Documentary were awarded.

== Winners and nominees ==
Best Feature: Sideways; Before Sunset; Eternal Sunshine of the Spotless Mind; I Heart Huckabees; Primer	Best Documentary Feature: The Agronomist; Bright Leaves; Fahrenheit 9/11; In the Realms of the Unreal; Tarnation
Breakthrough Director: Joshua Marston – Maria Full of Grace; Rodney Evans – Brother to Brother; Debra Granik – Down to the Bone; Nicole Kassell – The Woodsman; Lori Silverbush and Michael Skolnik – On the Outs	Breakthrough Actor: Catalina Sandino Moreno – Maria Full of Grace as Maria Álvarez; Mos Def – The Woodsman as Sgt. Lucas; Ensemble cast of Everyday People; Anthony Mackie – Brother to Brother as Perry; Dallas Roberts – A Home at the End of the World as Jonathan Glover

== Special awards ==
=== Celebrate New York Award ===
- Eternal Sunshine of the Spotless Mind

=== Gotham Tributes ===
- Don Cheadle
- Mike Leigh
- Michael Moore
- Dan Talbot
