= Soldier's Girl =

2003 television film by Frank Pierson

- Print advertisement
- Written by: Ron Nyswaner
- Directed by: Frank Pierson
- Starring: Troy Garity; Lee Pace; Andre Braugher; Shawn Hatosy
- Music by: Jan A.P. Kaczmarek
- Countries of origin: United States; Canada
- Original language: English

Production
- Producers: Linda Gottlieb; Doro Bachrach
- Cinematography: Paul Sarossy
- Editor: Katina Zinner
- Running time: 112 minutes
- Production company: Bachrach/Gottlieb Productions

Original release
- Network: Showtime
- Release: May 31, 2003

Soldier's Girl is a 2003 biographical drama television film written by Ron Nyswaner and directed by Frank Pierson. It is based on the true story of the relationship between Calpernia Addams and Barry Winchell and the events that led up to Winchell's murder by fellow soldiers Justin Fisher and Calvin Glover on July 6, 1999.

The film stars Troy Garity as Winchell and Lee Pace as Addams. The film premiered on Showtime on May 31, 2003.

Soldier's Girl was listed among the ten best Television Programs of the Year (2003) by the American Film Institute.

== Plot ==
Barry is a private with the 101st Airborne Division of the United States Army, stationed at Fort Campbell, Kentucky, while Calpernia works as a showgirl at a transgender revue in Nashville, Tennessee. Barry's roommate Justin Fisher brings Barry to the club where Calpernia performs. When Barry and Calpernia start dating, Fisher, out of jealousy, participates in spreading rumors about Barry's alleged affair, which appeared to be a violation of the military's "don't ask, don't tell" policy that forbids discussion of sexual orientation of military personnel. Barry faces increasing harassment and pressure, which explodes into violence over a Fourth of July weekend after Barry easily beats Calvin Glover in a fight. While Calpernia performs in a pageant in Nashville, Barry is beaten to death in his sleep by Glover with a baseball bat given to him by Fisher. The film ends with a discussion of the aftermath.

== Cast ==
- Troy Garity as Barry Winchell
- Lee Pace as Calpernia Addams
- Andre Braugher as Carlos Diaz
- Shawn Hatosy as Justin Fisher
- Philip Eddolls as Calvin Glover
- Merwin Mondesir as Henry Millens
- Daniel Petronijevic as Collin Baker

== Production ==
Soldier's Girl was filmed in Toronto and Barrie in Ontario, Canada.

== Reception ==
=== Critical response ===
On Rotten Tomatoes, the film holds an approval rating of 88% based on reviews from 8 critics.

John Leonard of New York magazine wrote: "All three principal performances are superb."

Carin Gorrell in Psychology Today calls Soldier's Girl a "gut-wrenching and provacative work" adding that Troy Garity's "performance is so strong that it's nearly impossible to react without sympathy"

In Variety David Rooney wrote: "Both Garity and newcomer Pace give complex, controlled performances, full-bodied and richly empathetic, making the union between this unlikely couple seem entirely plausible and natural".

=== Accolades ===
Accolades for Soldier's Girl
| Year | Award | Category | Recipient(s) | Result |
|---|---|---|---|---|
| 2003 | Emmy Awards | Outstanding Directing for a Miniseries, Movie, or Dramatic Special | Frank Pierson | Nominated |
| 2003 | Emmy Awards | Outstanding Prosthetic Makeup for a Series, Limited Series, Movie or Special | Raymond Mackintosh and Russell Cate | Nominated |
| 2003 | Gotham Independent Film Awards | Breakthrough Actor | Lee Pace | Won |
| 2004 | GLAAD Media Awards | Outstanding TV Movie or Limited Series | Soldier's Girl | Nominated |
| 2004 | Golden Globe Awards | Best Television Limited Series or Motion Picture Made for Television | Soldier's Girl | Nominated |
| 2004 | Golden Globe Awards | Best Performance by an Actor in a Limited Series or a Motion Picture Made for Television | Troy Garity | Nominated |
| 2004 | Golden Globe Awards | Best Performance by an Actor in a Supporting Role in a Series, Limited Series or Motion Picture Made for Television | Lee Pace | Nominated |
| 2004 | Independent Spirit Awards | Best Male Lead | Lee Pace | Nominated |
| 2004 | Independent Spirit Awards | Best Supporting Male | Troy Garity | Nominated |
| 2004 | Peabody Award | —N/a | Soldier's Girl | Won |
| 2004 | Satellite Awards | Best Television Film | Soldier's Girl | Nominated |
| 2004 | Satellite Awards | Best Actor – Miniseries or Television Film | Troy Garity | Nominated |
| 2004 | Satellite Awards | Best Actor – Miniseries or Television Film | Lee Pace | Nominated |
| 2004 | Satellite Awards | Best Supporting Actor – Series, Miniseries or Television Film | Shawn Hatosy | Nominated |
| 2004 | TCA Awards | Outstanding Achievement in Movies, Miniseries and Specials | Soldier's Girl | Nominated |

== See also ==
- Boys Don't Cry (1999)
- A Girl Like Me: The Gwen Araujo Story (2006)
- Gay bashing
- Sexual orientation and gender identity in the United States military
