= Wonderland (1997 film) =

American documentary film

- Directed by: John O'Hagan
- Produced by: John O'Hagan
- Starring: Bill Griffith; Eddie Money; Keelin Curnuck; Roy Curnuck
- Music by: Tracy McKnight
- Release date: 1997
- Running time: 80 min.
- Language: English

Wonderland is an American documentary film produced and directed by John O'Hagan that was released in 1997. It is a satirical account of Levittown, New York and its residents.

== Overview ==
The early part of the film shows archival scenes to present a historical overview of the construction and marketing of the planned community. The remainder consists of interviews with residents, mostly retirees, who display their candor and eccentricities. A resident singing "Little Boxes" while playing her zither. A woman with her collection of "examples of native dress from over 70 countries." A couple who redid the interior of their house entirely in wood. A G.I. and his Egyptian war bride reminiscing about the hamlet's wife-swapping days. A karaoke enthusiast in his forties and still living with his parents who dreams of being a "really successful soul singer." Another woman who claims that her house is haunted. A man with a collection of plates with the pictures of famous people on them. The father-daughter combination of Roy and Keelin Curnuck are also featured. The former is an ice sculptor who specializes in miniature frozen replicas of Levittown houses, while the latter is Miss New York USA 1996 who is shown pumping iron while wearing her formal gown and tiara.

Two notable former residents have their interviews appear in the documentary. One is Bill Griffith who criticizes Levittown's eerie "striving to be the ideal American Leave It to Beaver-land" and shows a few of his Zippy comic strips that express his observations based on his experiences. His segment was interrupted by a cameo appearance by his mother who, wearing a swimsuit and sun tanning herself, displays her Zippy tattoo on her shoulder for the cameraman. The other is Eddie Money who insists that if he had "two tickets to paradise, I'd probably get back to Levittown." His hit song mentioned in the quote accompanies the film's closing credits.

== Production ==
While a student at New York University, O'Hagan originally intended to create a fictional film, but his lack of familiarity with Levittown, New York led him to make a documentary instead. As he recounted in a 1997 interview with IndieWire's Aaron Krach, "I went to the bowling alley and told the owner that I wanted to meet some original owners of Levittown houses. She made an announcement over the loudspeaker and fifty people lined up. The first guy in line was the bowling guy with the bird and plate collection. After hanging out with him and meeting people I realized there was something really fascinating about them as characters. So I just decided to make a documentary."

O'Hagan explained his approach to this film by saying, "I think making documentaries is like going on safari. You either hunt your subject, or you observe them. I made a conscious effort to observe." Interviews with Herbert J. Gans and Robert Venturi were left out of the final cut.

== Reception ==
O'Hagan insisted that he had no interest in ridiculing his subjects, claiming that such people "exist in any town in America." A reviewer who agreed with him and praised the film was Ella Taylor of The Atlantic who wrote that he "finds both humor and dignity in Levittown without glossing over its dark side, and in so doing runs with graceful intelligence against the grain of cinema's long-standing contempt for suburbia."

Others criticized the documentary for a tendency toward art-house condescension. One such opinion came from Stephen Holden of The New York Times who stated, "Most of the humor comes at the expense of longtime Levittown residents, who are made to look like a bunch of aging, addle-brained eccentrics happily rotting in a suburb where, the movie implies, the cookie-cutter architecture corresponds to the residents' narrow minds." Comparing it to Vernon, Florida which O'Hagan actually watched while producing his film, John Petrakis of the Chicago Tribune said that "while (Errol) Morris is able to find just the right phrase, glance or moment to give his subject depth and emotion, O'Hagan seems more intent on using cutaways and fast edits to make fun of his interviewees."

Prior to the film's original airing on Cinemax at 11:00 pm EDT on July 7, 1997, Walter Goodman was less critical than his Times colleague but thought that O'Hagan's problem was "how to make a program about people doing and saying boring things that is not itself boring. He does not quite succeed, but Wonderland does demonstrate that people can be boring in the darndest ways."

Dennis Harvey of Variety thought it lacked contextualization by failing to adequately answer the question "What precise qualities made Levittown both a personification and joke-butt of the postwar era’s materialist aspirations?"

== Honors ==
Wonderland was reviewed at the American Spectrum section of the Sundance Film Festival on January 17, 1997. Within subsequent months, it was submitted for competition at the South by Southwest (SXSW) Festival and honored with the Audience Awards for best documentary at the San Francisco International Film Festival. The film also won a CableACE Award for Historical Documentary Special or Series and a Best Documentary (Long Form) at the 1998 Nashville Independent Film Festival. O'Hagan received nominations for the Open Palm Award for Breakthrough Director at the Gotham Independent Film Awards 1997 and Outstanding Directing – Documentaries at the 50th Directors Guild of America Awards.
