= Lee Pace =

American actor (born 1979)

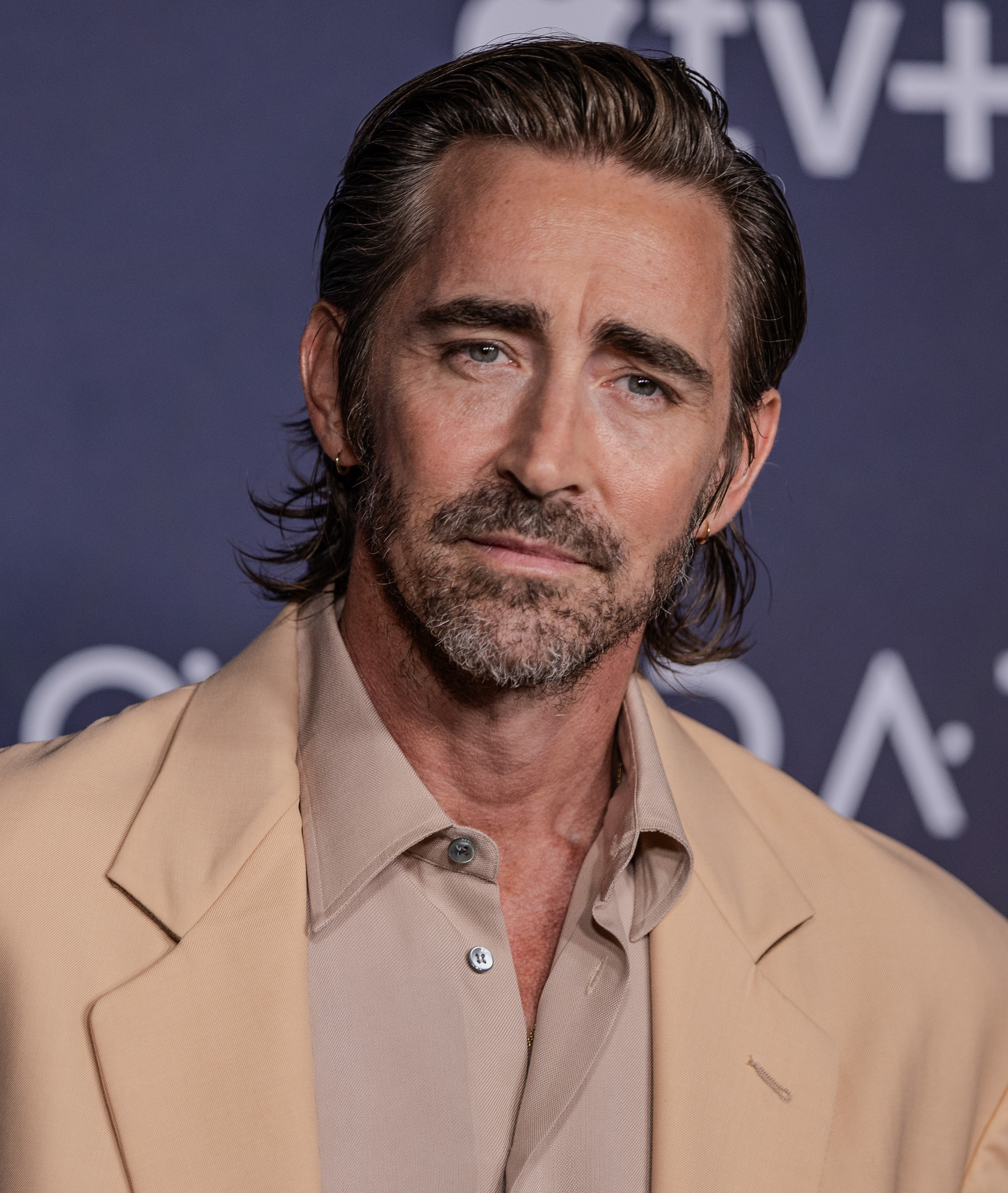
- Lee Pace in 2025
- Born: Lee Grinner Pace; March 25, 1979 (age 47); Chickasha, Oklahoma, U.S.
- Education: Juilliard School (BFA)
- Occupation: Actor
- Years active: 2001–present
- Spouse: Matthew Foley (m. 2021)

Lee Grinner Pace (born March 25, 1979) is an American actor. He starred as Thranduil the Elvenking in The Hobbit trilogy and as Joe MacMillan in the period drama television series Halt and Catch Fire. He has appeared in the Marvel Cinematic Universe as Ronan the Accuser, a role he first played in Guardians of the Galaxy and reprised in Captain Marvel. Pace earned a 2008 Emmy nomination for his portrayal of Ned in the comedy drama television series Pushing Daisies. Since 2021, he has starred as the galactic emperor Brother Day in the science fiction television series Foundation.

== Early life ==
Pace was born in Chickasha, Oklahoma, to Charlotte, a schoolteacher, and James, an engineer. He has a brother and a sister. As a child, Pace spent several years in Saudi Arabia, where his father worked in the oil business; the family later moved to Houston, Texas. He was raised Catholic.

Pace attended Klein High School in Spring, Texas, a suburb of Houston, with actor Matt Bomer. Pace briefly stopped attending high school to act at Houston's Alley Theatre before returning to graduate. At the Alley, he appeared in productions of The Spider's Web and The Greeks.

In 1997, he was accepted by the Juilliard School's Drama Division as a member of Group 30 (1997–2001), which included actors Anthony Mackie and Tracie Thoms. While there, he was in several plays, including Romeo and Juliet as Romeo, Richard II in the title role, and Julius Caesar as Cassius. He graduated from Juilliard with a Bachelor of Fine Arts degree.

== Career ==
=== Theater ===
After graduation, Pace starred in several off-Broadway plays, including The Credeaux Canvas and The Fourth Sister. He starred in a production of Craig Lucas's Small Tragedy, for which he was nominated for a Lucille Lortel Award as Outstanding Actor. In 2006, Pace starred in the two-character play Guardians by Peter Morris, which earned Pace his second nomination for a Lortel Award as Outstanding Actor.

Pace made his Broadway debut in Larry Kramer's play The Normal Heart, portraying Bruce Niles. It opened at the Golden Theatre on April 27, 2011. The show ran for a total of 96 performances, with July 10 marking its final performance.

Pace was cast as composer Vincenzo Bellini in Golden Age, which began previews November 15, 2012. The play, written by Terrence McNally, began its run at the Manhattan Theatre Club December 4, 2012. The previews were originally scheduled for November 13, 2012, but two shows were cancelled as a result of Hurricane Sandy.

Pace played the role of Joe Pitt in the Broadway revival of the Royal National Theatre's production of Angels in America. Previews began at the Neil Simon Theatre on February 23, 2018, and the show opened on March 25, 2018.

=== Film ===
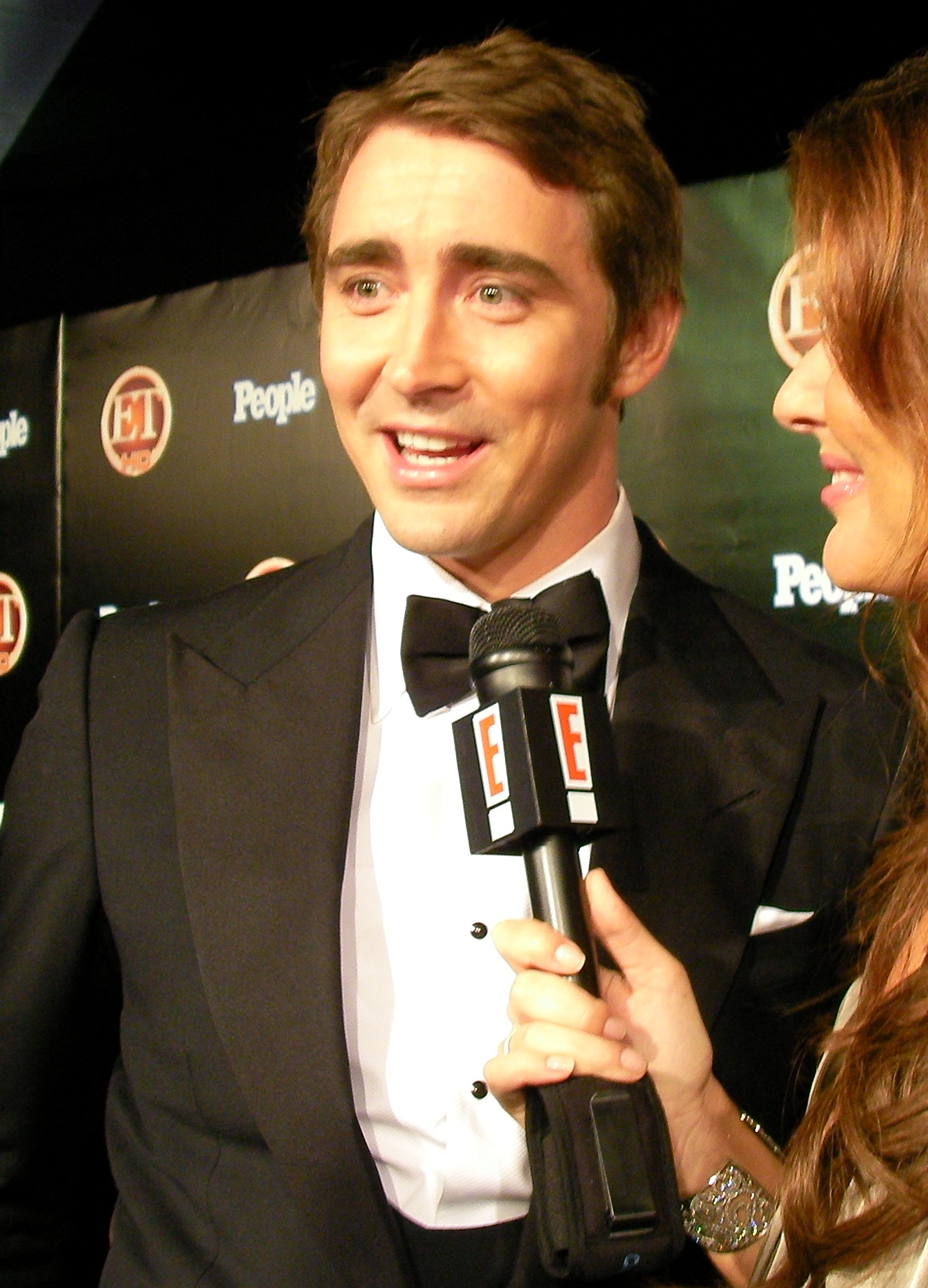
Pace at the Post-Emmys after party in 2008.

Pace gained recognition for his role in the 2003 film Soldier's Girl, based on real events, in which he played the central role of Calpernia Addams. Of the role, Pace has said:

Not even my excellent training at Juilliard prepared me for my first movie role, where I played a transsexual who falls in love with a military guy in Soldier's Girl. Here I was, this 6 feet 3 inches (1.91 m), 190 pounds (86 kg), lanky kid from Chickasha, Oklahoma, not knowing how to begin being a woman. So I saw documentaries about transsexuals, I lost twenty-five pounds, and I put on prosthetic boobs and hips to become that character. There were times I'd look in the mirror and wonder, 'What am I doing to my life here? My dad is going to kill me!' But the reason I went into acting was to be able to play parts as complicated and important as this one. In playing a transsexual, I got the chance to help change people's perspective about other people, and that is a powerful thing. I'm playing a swashbuckling bandit in my next film, but I'll always be proud of Soldier's Girl. "

Pace won a Gotham Independent Film Award for Breakthrough Actor and was nominated for several other awards, including a Golden Globe Award, for his work in the film.

In 2006, Pace starred in Tarsem Singh's The Fall. Upon release, The Fall was received with mixed reviews among critics and was a box office failure. His next film was Miss Pettigrew Lives for a Day. Pace was featured in Possession. Pace played supporting roles in The White Countess, Infamous, When in Rome and The Good Shepherd. In 2010, Pace appeared as Phil Winslow in the film Marmaduke.

In 2012, Pace starred as nomadic vampire Garrett in The Twilight Saga: Breaking Dawn – Part 2. Pace was admittedly aware of the reputation linked to the Twilight franchise, and revealed that he "went in to this a little like 'You know what you're getting into, just do what you can.' " However, he enjoyed the experience and only had praise for the director Bill Condon. Stephenie Meyer, the author of the Twilight saga, was very satisfied with Pace's performance as Garrett, since he "stood out as someone who really was just so much fun and really looked the part." The movie was met with a mixed reception by critics. However, for some critics, such as Betsy Sharkey of the Los Angeles Times, the only issue was that he was introduced too late in the series: "Why, oh, why didn't they introduce him sooner?" Meanwhile, Sara Stewart of the New York Post simply described him as a "standout."

On April 30, 2011, it was announced that Pace had been cast as the king of the Mirkwood Elves, Thranduil, in Peter Jackson's film adaptation of J. R. R. Tolkien's The Hobbit. The announcement was made by Peter Jackson, who revealed that Pace had been his favorite for the part, since he saw his performance in The Fall. The character had previously been mentioned in Jackson's The Lord of the Rings: The Fellowship of the Ring, and had previously been portrayed in The Hobbit, voiced by Oscar-nominated director Otto Preminger, and in the 1968 BBC Radio series, voiced by the British actor Leonard Fenton. Pace made three trips to New Zealand, and called it a "fantastic experience." The character appeared in the prologue of The Hobbit: An Unexpected Journey released in December 2012, and had a larger role in The Hobbit: The Desolation of Smaug released in December 2013 and in the last film of the series, The Hobbit: The Battle of the Five Armies, released on December 17, 2014. Pace is set to reprise his role as Thranduill in The Lord of the Rings: The Hunt for Gollum.

On July 28, 2011, it was announced that Pace had been cast in Steven Spielberg's Lincoln, as the one-time New York City mayor Fernando Wood, an early Confederate supporter. The events in the film take place in 1865, when Wood served in the House of Representatives. However, at the time, Wood was 53 years old, which is 20 years senior to Pace's age when he portrayed him. In a Q&A, Spielberg revealed that he decided to offer Pace the part after he saw his performance in Ceremony. Of the experience of the film, Pace said that "it was a real pinnacle of what I've done as an actor." Lincoln was nominated for 12 Academy Awards, including Best Picture, and was nominated for Best Ensemble at the Screen Actors Guild Award. However, Pace was not included among the ensemble's nomination, and several bloggers were annoyed by this, including Katey Rich of Cinemablend.com and Nathaniel Rogers of The Film Experience.

Pace played villain Ronan the Accuser in the Marvel Studios film Guardians of the Galaxy ,(2014). He reprised the character in Captain Marvel.

=== Television ===
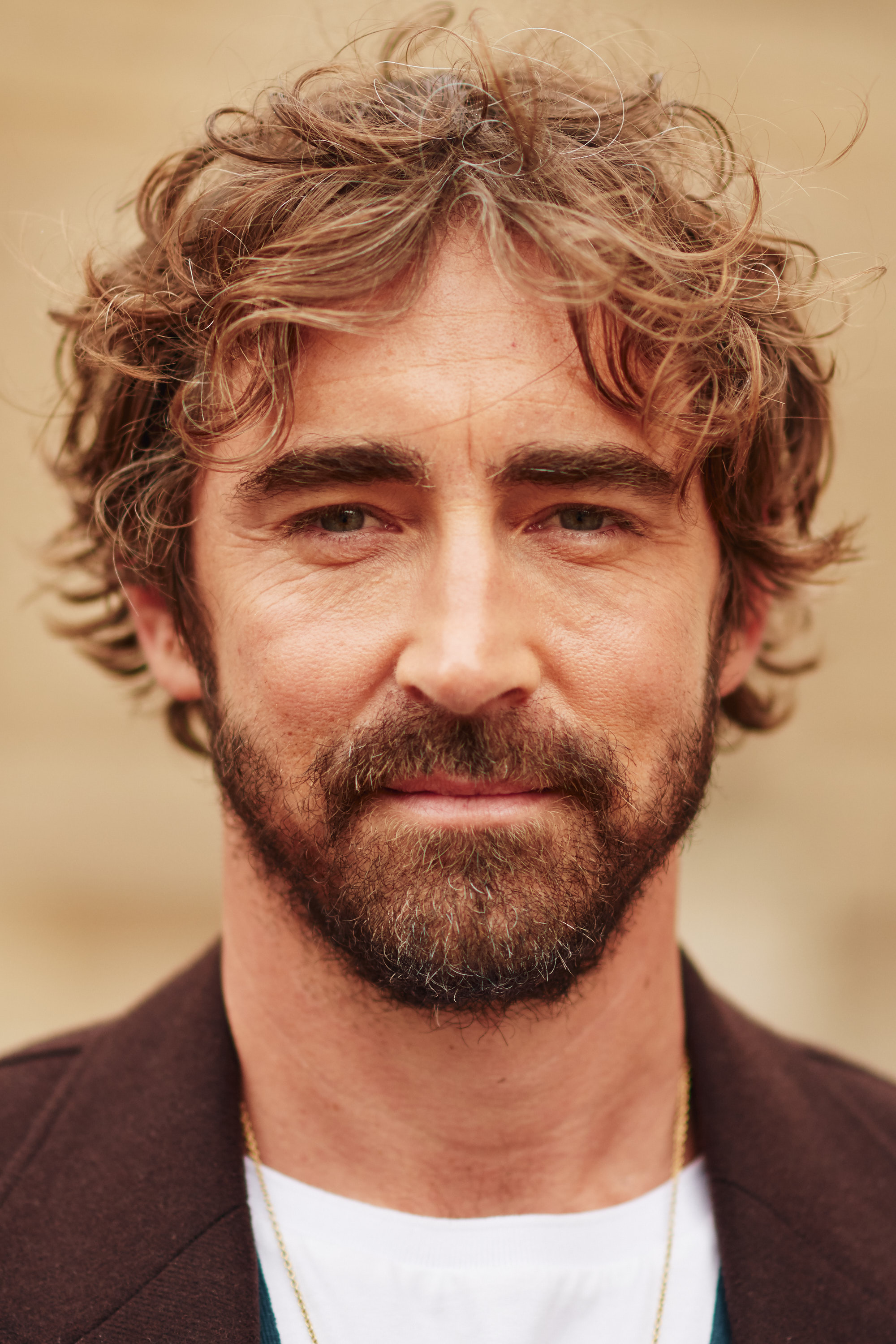
Pace in September 2019 at Paris Fashion Week

Pace played Aaron Tyler in the acclaimed but short-lived 2004 television series Wonderfalls, which was co-created by Bryan Fuller. Fuller cast Pace in the lead role of Ned in the series Pushing Daisies which debuted on ABC in October 2007 and returned for its second and final season on October 1, 2008. He received a Primetime Emmy Award nomination for Outstanding Lead Actor in a Comedy Series for his performance.

Pace has portrayed a child molester in the Law & Order: Special Victims Unit episode "Guilt." In 2010, he was cast in the unsold HBO pilot The Miraculous Year directed by Kathryn Bigelow. From 2014 to 2017, he played the role of Joe MacMillan in the AMC series Halt and Catch Fire.

In 2018, Pace was cast as Sam Colin in Hong Kong action crime television series Flying Tiger 2 produced by Shaw Brothers Studios.

In 2019, Apple announced that Pace had joined the cast of its adaptation of Isaac Asimov's Foundation, which premiered in September 2021, playing the role of Brother Day, the Galactic Empire's Emperor.

Pace was the narrator of the horror podcast entitled Darkest Night, which was produced by the Paragon Collective and AMC's streaming service Shudder.

In 2025, Pace was cast as the voice actor for Grand Regent Thragg in Season 4 of Invincible, an Amazon Prime Video animated television series adapted from the Image Comics comic book written by Robert Kirkman.

== Personal life ==
Pace's sexual orientation became a topic of public discussion after he was accidentally outed as gay by Ian McKellen, who worked with him in The Hobbit films, in 2012. McKellen's "outing" of Pace was described in the press as a blunder and an accident on his part, as Pace had never addressed the subject. In an interview with W in February 2018, Pace mentioned having dated both men and women, and in June 2018, he spoke about being a queer actor in an interview with The New York Times. He is married to Matthew Foley, an executive at Thom Browne.

== Filmography ==
=== Film ===
Key
†	Denotes films that have not yet been released

Year	Title	Role	Notes
2005	The White Countess	Thomas Crane	
2006	Infamous	Richard Hickock	
2006	The Fall	Roy Walker / The Masked Bandit	
2006	The Good Shepherd	Richard Hayes	
2008	Polarbearman	Man	Short film
2008	Miss Pettigrew Lives for a Day	Michael Pardew	
2009	A Single Man	Grant	
2009	Possession	Roman	
2010	When in Rome	Brady Sacks	
2010	Marmaduke	Phil Winslow	
2011	The Resident	Jack	
2011	Ceremony	Whit Coutell	
2011	30 Beats	Matt Roberts	
2012	Lincoln	Fernando Wood	
2012	The Twilight Saga: Breaking Dawn – Part 2	Garrett	
2012	The Hobbit: An Unexpected Journey	Thranduil	
2013	The Hobbit: The Desolation of Smaug	Thranduil	
2014	The Hobbit: The Battle of the Five Armies	Thranduil	
2014	Guardians of the Galaxy	Ronan the Accuser	
2015	The Program	Bill Stapleton	
2017	The Keeping Hours	Mark	
2017	The Book of Henry	David Daniels	
2017	Revolt	Bo	
2018	The Party's Just Beginning	Dale	
2018	Driven	John DeLorean	
2019	Captain Marvel	Ronan the Accuser	
2019	Weathering with You	Keisuke Suga (voice)	English dub
2022	Bodies Bodies Bodies	Greg	
2025	After This Death	Elliot	
2025	The Running Man	Evan McCone	
2026	Practical Magic 2	Professor Ian Wright	
2027	The Lord of the Rings: The Hunt for Gollum †	Thranduil	Filming

=== Television ===
Year	Title	Role	Notes
2002	Law & Order: Special Victims Unit	Benjamin Tucker	Episode: "Guilt"
2003	Soldier's Girl	Calpernia Addams	Television film
2004	Wonderfalls	Aaron Tyler	Main cast
2007–2009	Pushing Daisies	Ned	Main cast
2014–2017	Halt and Catch Fire	Joe MacMillan	Main cast
2015	The Mindy Project	Alex Eakin	Episode: "San Francisco Bae"
2015	Robot Chicken	Heinrich Himmler (voice)	Episode: "Zero Vegetables"
2019	Flying Tiger 2	Sam Colin	Hong Kong TVB & Shaw Brothers Studio series
2021–present	Foundation	Brother Day (Cleon I, XII, XIII, XVII, XXIV)	Main cast
2026–present	Invincible	Thragg (voice)	Recurring cast

== Awards and nominations ==
Year	Award	Category	Work	Result	Ref.
2003	Gotham Award	Breakthrough Actor	Soldier's Girl	Won	
2004	Golden Globe Award	Best Supporting Actor – Series, Miniseries or Television Film	Soldier's Girl	Nominated	
2004	Satellite Award	Best Actor in a Miniseries or a Motion Picture Made for Television	Soldier's Girl	Nominated	
2004	Independent Spirit Award	Best Male Lead	Soldier's Girl	Nominated	
2004	Lucille Lortel Award	Outstanding Lead Actor	Small Tragedy	Nominated	
2007	Silver Bear	Outstanding Artistic Contribution Shared with cast	The Good Shepherd	Won	
2007	Lucille Lortel Award	Outstanding Lead Actor	Guardians	Nominated	
2007	Satellite Award	Best Actor in a Television Series Musical or Comedy	Pushing Daisies	Nominated	
2008	Golden Globe Award	Best Actor – Television Series Musical or Comedy	Pushing Daisies	Nominated	
2008	Saturn Award	Best Actor on Television	Pushing Daisies	Nominated	
2008	Primetime Emmy Award	Outstanding Lead Actor in a Comedy Series	Pushing Daisies	Nominated	
2008	Satellite Award	Best Actor in a Television Series Musical or Comedy	Pushing Daisies	Nominated	
2014	Satellite Award	Best Actor in a Television Series Drama	Halt and Catch Fire	Nominated	
2022	Critics' Choice Super Award	Best Actor in a Science Fiction/Fantasy Series	Foundation	Nominated	
