= Gotham Independent Film Awards 2012 =

Annual US film awards ceremony

22nd Annual Gotham Independent Film Awards
- Date: November 26, 2012
- Country: United States
- Presented by: Independent Filmmaker Project
- Hosted by: Mike Birbiglia

Highlights
- Most nominations: Beasts of the Southern Wild, Bernie, Middle of Nowhere and Moonrise Kingdom (2)
- Best Feature: Moonrise Kingdom
- Breakthrough Director: Benh Zeitlin – Beasts of the Southern Wild
- Website: https://gotham.ifp.org/

The 22nd Annual Gotham Independent Film Awards, presented by the Independent Filmmaker Project, were held on November 26, 2012. The nominees were announced on October 18, 2012. The ceremony was hosted by Mike Birbiglia.

During the award ceremony, Birbiglia roasted special award recipient David O. Russell by reading a transcript of Russell's argument with Lily Tomlin that occurred on the set of I Heart Huckabees. The event, specifically the joke and what transpired around it, later formed a large part of Birbiglia's show, Thank God for Jokes.

== Winners and nominees ==
Best Feature: Moonrise Kingdom; Bernie; The Loneliest Planet; The Master; Middle of Nowhere	Best Documentary Feature: How to Survive a Plague; Detropia; Marina Abramovic: The Artist is Present; Room 237; The Waiting Room
Breakthrough Director: Benh Zeitlin – Beasts of the Southern Wild; Zal Batmanglij – Sound of My Voice; Brian M. Cassidy and Melanie Shatzky – Francine; Jason Cortlund and Julia Halperin – Now, Forager; Antonio Méndez Esparza – Aquí y allá	Breakthrough Actor: Emayatzy Corinealdi – Middle of Nowhere as Ruby; Mike Birbiglia – Sleepwalk with Me as Matt Pandamiglio; Thure Lindhardt – Keep the Lights On as Erik Rothman; Melanie Lynskey – Hello I Must Be Going as Amy Minsky; Quvenzhané Wallis – Beasts of the Southern Wild as Hushpuppy
Audience Award: Artifact; Beasts of the Southern Wild; Burn; The Invisible War; Once in a Lullaby: PS 22 Chorus Story	Best Film Not Playing at a Theater Near You: An Oversimplification of Her Beauty; Kid-Thing; Red Flag; Sun Don't Shine; Tiger Tail in Blue
Best Ensemble Performance: Your Sister's Sister – Emily Blunt, Rosemarie DeWitt, and Mark Duplass; Bernie – Jack Black, Shirley MacLaine, and Matthew McConaughey; Moonrise Kingdom – Bob Balaban, Jared Gilman, Kara Hayward, Frances McDormand, Bill Murray, Edward Norton, Jason Schwartzman, Tilda Swinton, and Bruce Willis; Safety Not Guaranteed – Kristen Bell, Jenica Bergere, Mark Duplass, Jeff Garlin, Jake Johnson, Aubrey Plaza, Mary Lynn Rajskub, and Karan Soni; Silver Linings Playbook – Bradley Cooper, Robert De Niro, Anupam Kher, Jennifer Lawrence, Chris Tucker, and Jacki Weaver

== Special awards ==
=== Spotlight on Women Filmmakers "Live the Dream" Grant ===
- Stacie Passon – Concussion
  - Leah Meyerhoff – I Believe in Unicorns
  - Visra Vichit Vadakan – Karaoke Girl

=== Gotham Tributes ===
- Marion Cotillard
- Matt Damon
- David O. Russell
- Jeff Skoll
