= On the Run (1999 film) =

1999 USA-Portugal film production

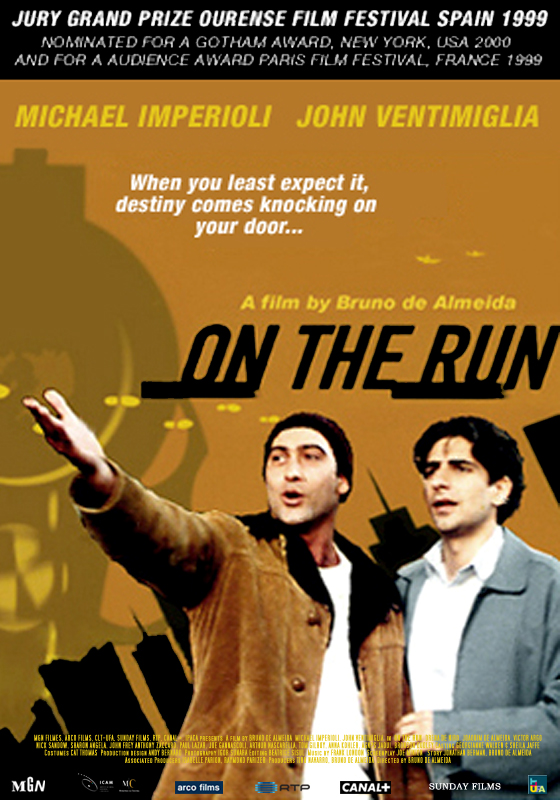
- Directed by: Bruno de Almeida
- Written by: Joseph Minion
- Story by: Bruno de Almeida; Jonathan Berman
- Produced by: Bruno de Almeida; Tino Navarro
- Starring: Michael Imperioli; John Ventimiglia; Drena De Niro; Nick Sandow; Sharon Angela
- Cinematography: Igor Sunara
- Edited by: Beatrice Sisul
- Music by: Frank London
- Production companies: Arco Films; MGN Filmes; Sunday Films; RTP
- Distributed by: Phaedra Cinema
- Release dates: January 29, 1999 (Portugal); June 2, 2000 (United States)
- Running time: 92 minutes
- Countries: United States; Portugal; France
- Language: English

On the Run (Portuguese: Em Fuga) is a 1999 crime comedy film directed by Bruno de Almeida in his directorial debut. It stars Michael Imperioli and John Ventimiglia and is written by Joseph Minion, based on a story by de Almeida and Jonathan Berman.

The film premiered in Portugal in January 1999 and was given a limited theatrical release in the United States on June 2, 2000. It won the award for Best Film at the 1999 Ourense Film Festival in Spain and was nominated the Open Palm Award at the Gotham Awards. It had its cable debut on The Independent Film Channel in 2001 and was released on DVD in 2002.

The film is set in New York City. A lonely travel agent shelters his childhood friend who has escaped from prison.

== Premise ==
Albert is an introverted travel agent living a lonely life in New York City. When his childhood best friend Louie appears having just escaped from prison, Albert's quiet existence is permanently disrupted. What ensues is one long, crazy night in New York that will change both their lives forever.

== Cast ==
- Michael Imperioli as Albert de Santis
- John Ventimiglia as Louis Salazer
- Drena De Niro as Rita
- Nick Sandow as Jack
- Joaquim de Almeida as Ignácio
- Victor Argo as Man shaving
- Sharon Angela as Tina
- John Frey as George
- Anthony Zaccaro as Cop
- Paul Lazar as Cabbie
- Arthur Nascarella as Irwin
- Joseph Gannascoli as Tony
- Tom Gilroy as Tom
- Anna Kohler as Anna
- Agnès Jaoui as Kirstin
- Suzanne Shepherd as Travel Agent
- Bronson Dudley as Doctor Shapiro
- Dwight Ewell as Rasta

== Reception ==
Lisa Nesselson of Variety wrote, "Mostly inventive, and consistently well played, this mismatched-buddy film boasts ample laughs and awkward situations that are easy to identify with, wacky though they are." Writing in the New York Press, Matt Zoller Seitz said "the vibe is wonderfully fresh, and there isn't a dull or unpleasurable scene in the movie, thanks to De Almeida's ability to build spare but sustained comic setpieces and give the actors room to maneuver within them." He also praised the acting of the two male leads as well as the supporting cast. Portuguese publication Público similarly lauded the pairing of Imperioli and Ventimiglia and said they are given a "rare opportunity to shine as protagonists."

On the review aggregator website Rotten Tomatoes, 60% of 5 critics' reviews are positive. Metacritic, which uses a weighted average, assigned the film a score of 38 out of 100, based on 5 critics, indicating "generally unfavorable" reviews.

== Awards ==
- 1999 Ourense Independent Film Festival, Grand Prize for Best Feature - winner
- 2000 Gotham Film Awards, Open Palm Award - nominated

== Home media ==
On the Run was released on DVD by Pathfinder Home Ent. on August 27, 2002.
