= Gotham Independent Film Awards 2009 =

Annual US film awards ceremony

19th Annual Gotham Independent Film Awards
- Date: November 30, 2009
- Country: United States
- Presented by: Independent Filmmaker Project
- Hosted by: Kumail Nanjiani

Highlights
- Most wins: The Hurt Locker (2)
- Most nominations: Big Fan and The Hurt Locker (3)
- Best Feature: The Hurt Locker
- Breakthrough Director: Robert D. Siegel – Big Fan
- Website: https://gotham.ifp.org

The 19th Annual Gotham Independent Film Awards, presented by the Independent Filmmaker Project, were held on November 30, 2009. The nominees were announced on October 19, 2009. The ceremony was hosted by Kumail Nanjiani.

== Winners and nominees ==
Best Feature: The Hurt Locker; Amreeka; Big Fan; The Maid; A Serious Man	Best Documentary Feature: Food, Inc.; Good Hair; My Neighbor, My Killer; Paradise; Tyson
Breakthrough Director: Robert D. Siegel – Big Fan; Cruz Angeles – Don't Let Me Drown; Frazer Bradshaw – Everything Strange and New; Noah Buschel – The Missing Person; Derick Martini – Lymelife	Breakthrough Actor: Catalina Saavedra – The Maid as Raquel; Ben Foster – The Messenger as SSG Will Montgomery; Patton Oswalt – Big Fan as Paul Aufiero; Jeremy Renner – The Hurt Locker as Sergeant First Class William James; Souléymane Sy Savané – Goodbye Solo as Solo
Best Ensemble Performance: The Hurt Locker – Ralph Fiennes, Brian Geraghty, Evangeline Lilly, Anthony Mackie, David Morse, Guy Pearce, and Jeremy Renner; Adventureland – Jesse Eisenberg, Bill Hader, Margarita Levieva, Ryan Reynolds, Martin Starr, Kristen Stewart, and Kristen Wiig; Cold Souls – Paul Giamatti, Dina Korzun, David Strathairn, Emily Watson, and Katheryn Winnick; A Serious Man – Richard Kind, Sari Lennick, Fred Melamed, and Michael Stuhlbarg; Sugar – Richard Bull, Michael Gaston, Andre Holland, Ellary Porterfield, Rayniel Rufino, Algenis Perez Soto, Jaime Tirelli, and Ann Whitney	Best Film Not Playing at a Theater Near You: You Won't Miss Me; Everything Strange and New; Guy and Madeline on a Park Bench; October Country; Zero Bridge

=== Gotham Tributes ===
- Tim Bevan and Eric Fellner
- Kathryn Bigelow
- Natalie Portman
- Stanley Tucci
