= Gotham Independent Film Awards 2002 =

Annual US film awards ceremony

12th Annual Gotham Independent Film Awards
- Date: September 26, 2002
- Country: United States
- Presented by: Independent Filmmaker Project
- Hosted by: Rosie Perez and John Turturro

Highlights
- Breakthrough Director: Eric Eason – Manito
- Website: https://gotham.ifp.org

The 12th Annual Gotham Independent Film Awards, presented by the Independent Filmmaker Project, were held on September 26, 2002 and were hosted by Rosie Perez and John Turturro. At the ceremony, Ang Lee and Bingham Ray were honored with Career Tributes, Whitney Dow and Marco Williams received the Anthony Radziwell Documentary Achievement Award and Julianne Moore was awarded the Actor Award.

== Winners and nominees ==
=== Breakthrough Actor ===
- Maggie Gyllenhaal – Secretary

=== Breakthrough Director (Open Palm Award) ===
- Eric Eason – Manito
  - Bertha Bay-Sa Pan – Face
  - Ethan Hawke – Chelsea Walls
  - Moisés Kaufman – The Laramie Project
  - Peter Mattei – Love in the Time of Money
  - Fisher Stevens – Just a Kiss

=== Anthony Radziwell Documentary Achievement Award ===
- Whitney Dow and Marco Williams for Two Towns of Jasper

=== Actor Award ===
- Julianne Moore

=== Career Tributes ===
- Ang Lee
- Bingham Ray
