= Henry Bean =

American film director, actor

- Born: August 3, 1945 (age 81); Philadelphia, Pennsylvania, US
- Occupations: Film actor; director; screenwriter
- Years active: 1977–present
- Children: 2

Henry Bean (born August 3, 1945) is an American screenwriter, film director, film producer, novelist, and actor.

Best known as a screenwriter, Bean wrote the screenplays for Internal Affairs, Deep Cover, Venus Rising, The Believer, Basic Instinct 2, and Noise. Bean directed The Believer and Noise. He also acted in The Believer, and was a producer on Deep Cover and Noise.

== Life ==
Bean was born in Philadelphia, to Fahnya (née Schorr) and Donald Bean (a lawyer). Bean is Jewish. He received a BA from Yale University in 1967; and a MA from Stanford University in 1973.

== Career ==
Bean's 1983 novel False Match won a PEN Center USA award for "First Fiction".

The Believer was awarded the dramatic Grand Jury Prize at the 2001 Sundance Festival; the Golden St. George at the 23rd Moscow International Film Festival.; and Bean was named a "Breakthrough Director" at the Gotham Independent Film Awards in 2001.

Bean was the inspiration for the protagonist of Noise. He was so tired of constant noise around him and his home in New York City that he decided to take the law into his own hands. If a car alarm was going off and the owner of the vehicle didn't rectify the situation, Bean would break into the car to disable the offending car alarm. Bean was eventually arrested and jailed. He admits to doing it a few more times since.

Bean was a co-writer on two episodes in the second season of The OA.

== Personal life ==
Bean married Nancy Eliason on January 3, 1968; they divorced February 14, 1970. He married screenwriter Leora Barish on March 23, 1980.

Bean has described growing up in an assimilated Jewish home; as an adult, he keeps a kosher home and has studied the Talmud.

== Filmography ==
Year	Title	Director	Writer	Producer	Notes
1983	Running Brave	No	Yes	No	
1990	Internal Affairs	No	Yes	No	
1992	Deep Cover	No	Yes	Yes	
1995	Venus Rising	No	Yes	No	
2001	The Believer	Yes	Yes	No	Role as "Ilio Manzetti"
2006	Basic Instinct 2	No	Yes	No	
2007	Noise	Yes	Yes	Yes	
