= Gotham Independent Film Awards 1997 =

Annual US film awards ceremony

7th Annual Gotham Independent Film Awards
- Date: September 16, 1997
- Country: United States
- Presented by: Independent Filmmaker Project
- Hosted by: Jon Stewart

Highlights
- Breakthrough Director: Macky Alston – Family Name
- Website: https://gotham.ifp.org

The 7th Annual Gotham Independent Film Awards, presented by the Independent Filmmaker Project, were held on September 16, 1997, and were hosted by Jon Stewart. At the ceremony, Bob and Harvey Weinstein were honored with a Career Tribute with Kevin Kline, Ruth Prawer Jhabvala, Faith Hubley and Errol Morris receiving the other individual awards.

== Winners and nominees ==
=== Breakthrough Director (Open Palm Award) ===
- Macky Alston – Family Name
  - Morgan J. Freeman – Hurricane Streets
  - John O’Hagan – Wonderland
  - Ira Sachs – The Delta
  - Alex Sichel – All Over Me

=== Actor Award ===
- Kevin Kline

=== Filmmaker Award ===
- Faith Hubley
- Errol Morris

=== Writer Award ===
- Ruth Prawer Jhabvala

=== Career Tribute ===
- Bob and Harvey Weinstein
