= Gotham Independent Film Awards 1992 =

Annual US film awards ceremony

2nd Annual Gotham Independent Film Awards
- Date: 1992
- Country: United States
- Presented by: Independent Filmmaker Project
- Hosted by: Charles Grodin

Highlights
- Breakthrough Director: Tom Kalin – Swoon
- Website: https://gotham.ifp.org

The 2nd Annual Gotham Independent Film Awards, presented by the Independent Filmmaker Project, were held in 1992. At the ceremony hosted by Charles Grodin, Arthur B. Krim was honored with a Career Tribute with Spike Lee, D. A. Pennebaker, Susan Sarandon, Jay Presson Allen, Thelma Schoonmaker and Lindsay Law receiving the other individual awards.

== Winners ==
=== Breakthrough Director (Open Palm Award) ===
- Tom Kalin – Swoon

=== Filmmaker Award ===
- Spike Lee
- D. A. Pennebaker

=== Actor Award ===
- Susan Sarandon

=== Writer Award ===
- Jay Presson Allen

=== Below-the-Line Award ===
- Thelma Schoonmaker, editor

=== Producer/Industry Executive Award ===
- Lindsay Law

=== Career Tribute ===
- Arthur B. Krim
