= Gotham Independent Film Awards 1993 =

Annual US film awards ceremony

3rd Annual Gotham Independent Film Awards
- Date: September 28, 1993
- Country: United States
- Presented by: Independent Filmmaker Project
- Hosted by: Eric Bogosian

Highlights
- Breakthrough Director: Leslie Harris – Just Another Girl on the I.R.T.
- Website: https://gotham.ifp.org

The 3rd Annual Gotham Independent Film Awards, presented by the Independent Filmmaker Project, were held on September 28, 1993 and were hosted by Eric Bogosian. At the ceremony, Martin Scorsese was honored with a Career Tribute with Harvey Keitel, John Guare, Patrizia von Brandenstein and David Brown receiving the other individual awards.

== Winners ==
=== Breakthrough Director (Open Palm Award) ===
- Leslie Harris – Just Another Girl on the I.R.T.

=== Actor Award ===
- Harvey Keitel

=== Writer Award ===
- John Guare

=== Below-the-Line Award ===
- Patrizia von Brandenstein, production designer

=== Producer/Industry Executive Award ===
- David Brown

=== Career Tribute ===
- Martin Scorsese
