= Gotham Independent Film Awards 1991 =

Annual US film awards ceremony

1st Annual Gotham Independent Film Awards
- Date: September 30, 1991
- Country: United States
- Presented by: Independent Filmmaker Project
- Hosted by: Charles Grodin

Highlights
- Breakthrough Director: Jennie Livingston – Paris Is Burning
- Website: https://gotham.ifp.org

The 1st Annual Gotham Independent Film Awards, presented by the Independent Filmmaker Project, were held on September 30, 1991. At the ceremony hosted by Charles Grodin, Irwin Young was honored with a Career Tribute with Jonathan Demme, John Turturro, Richard Price, Ernest Dickerson and Michael Hausman receiving the other individual awards.

== Winners ==
=== Breakthrough Director (Open Palm Award) ===
- Jennie Livingston – Paris Is Burning

=== Filmmaker Award ===
- Jonathan Demme

=== Actor Award ===
- John Turturro

=== Writer Award ===
- Richard Price

=== Below-the-Line Award ===
- Ernest Dickerson, cinematographer

=== Producer/Industry Executive Award ===
- Michael Hausman

=== Career Tribute ===
- Irwin Young
