= Gotham Independent Film Awards 1995 =

Annual US film awards ceremony

5th Annual Gotham Independent Film Awards
- Date: September 19, 1995
- Country: United States
- Presented by: Independent Filmmaker Project
- Hosted by: Michael Moore

Highlights
- Breakthrough Director: Rebecca Miller – Angela
- Website: https://gotham.ifp.org

The 5th Annual Gotham Independent Film Awards, presented by the Independent Filmmaker Project, were held on September 19, 1995 and were hosted by Michael Moore. At the ceremony, Robert Shaye was honored with a Career Tribute with Abel Ferrara, Christopher Walken, Pauline Kael, and Juliet Taylor receiving the other individual awards.

== Winners ==
=== Breakthrough Director (Open Palm Award) ===
- Rebecca Miller – Angela

=== Filmmaker Award ===
- Abel Ferrara

=== Actor Award ===
- Christopher Walken

=== Writer Award ===
- Pauline Kael

=== Below-the-Line Award ===
- Juliet Taylor, casting director

=== Career Tribute ===
- Robert Shaye
