= Gotham Independent Film Awards 1994 =

Annual US film awards ceremony

4th Annual Gotham Independent Film Awards
- Date: September 20, 1994
- Country: United States
- Presented by: Independent Filmmaker Project
- Hosted by: Eric Bogosian

Highlights
- Breakthrough Director: Rose Troche – Go Fish
- Website: https://gotham.ifp.org

The 4th Annual Gotham Independent Film Awards, presented by the Independent Filmmaker Project, were held on September 20, 1994. At the ceremony, hosted by Eric Bogosian for the second time, Sam Cohn was honored with a Career Tribute with Joel and Ethan Coen, Sigourney Weaver, Terry Southern and Howard Shore receiving the other individual awards.

== Winners ==
=== Breakthrough Director (Open Palm Award) ===
- Rose Troche – Go Fish

=== Filmmaker Award ===
- Joel and Ethan Coen

=== Actor Award ===
- Sigourney Weaver

=== Writer Award ===
- Terry Southern

=== Below-the-Line Award ===
- Howard Shore, composer

=== Career Tribute ===
- Sam Cohn
