= Calpernia Addams =

American LGBT rights activist

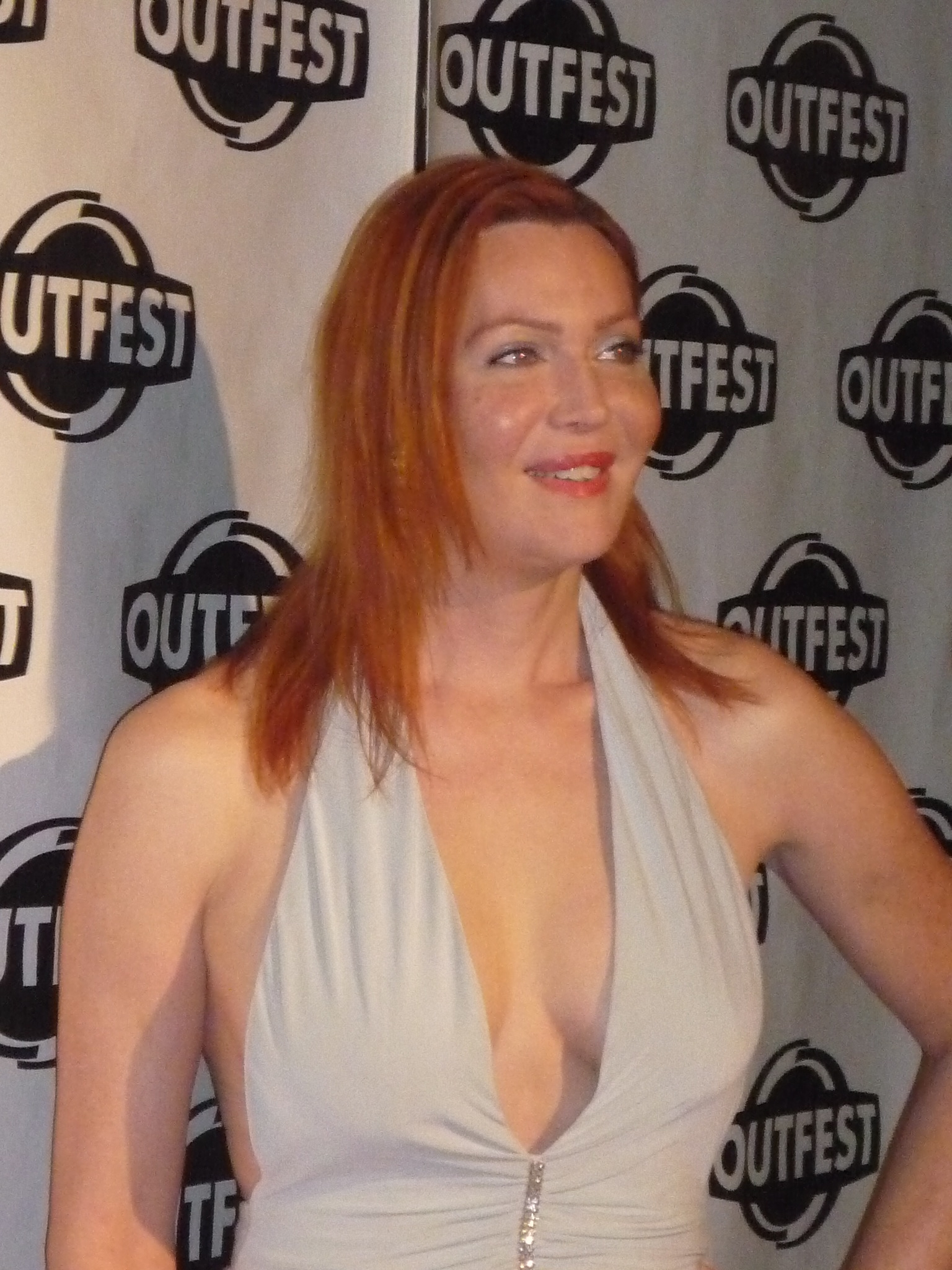
- Addams at the 2009 Outfest Legacy Awards
- Born: February 20, 1971 (age 55); Nashville, Tennessee, U.S.
- Occupations: Actress; musician; activist; spokesperson
- Years active: 2002–present
- Website: www.calpernia.com

Calpernia Sarah Addams (born February 20, 1971) is an American actress, musician, spokesperson and activist for transgender rights and issues.

== Early life ==
Addams grew up in Nashville, Tennessee. She served as a Hospital Corpsman with the Navy. During her last year in the military, she came out as a transgender woman. Addams chose the name "Calpernia" from the William Shakespeare play Julius Caesar (a variant spelling of Caesar's wife Calpurnia) and its appearance on a tombstone in the film The Addams Family.

== Career ==
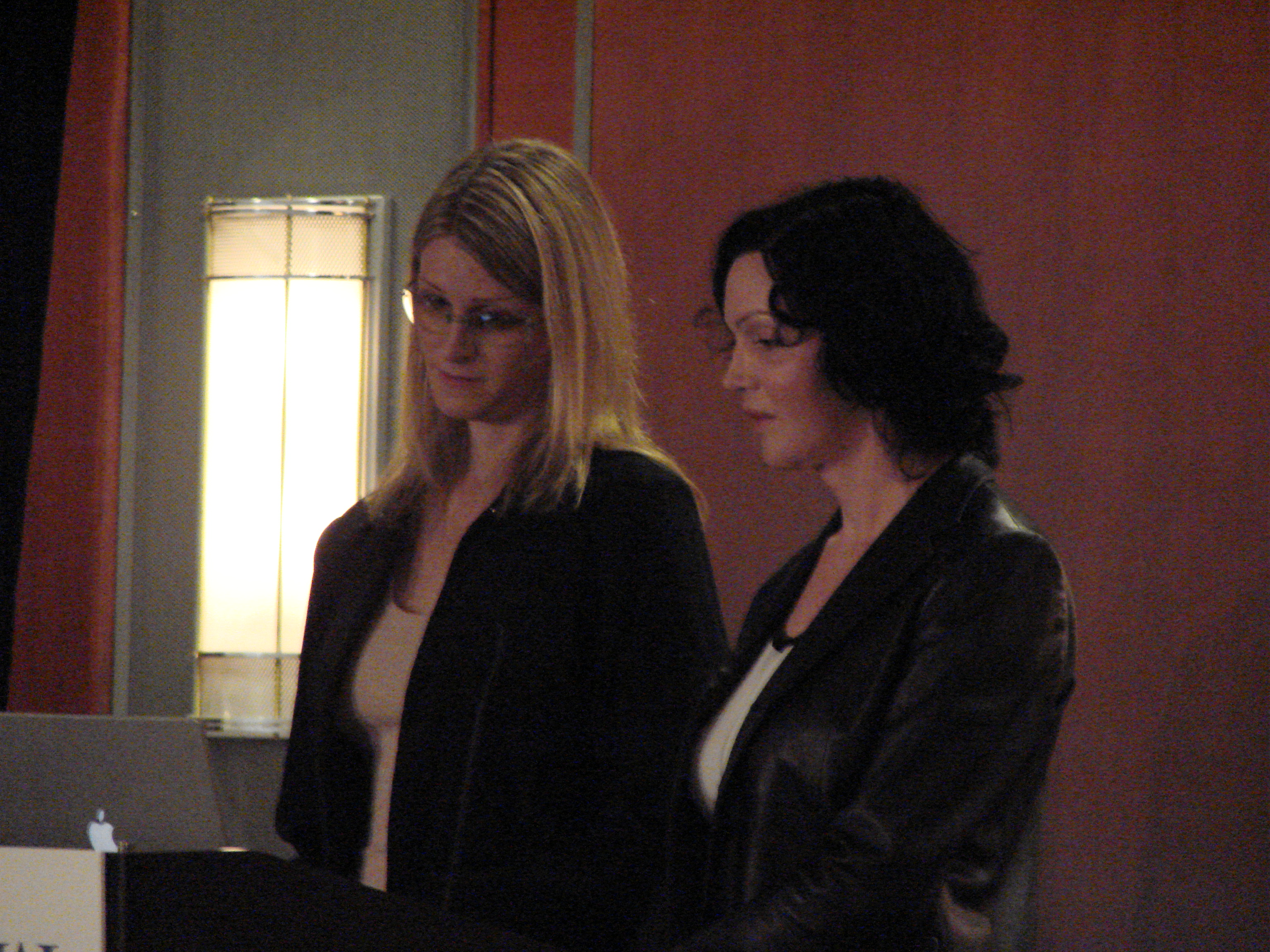
Addams and Andrea James at the Out and Equal Workplace Summit

In 2002, Addams formed Deep Stealth Productions in Hollywood with Andrea James. Deep Stealth creates educational and entertainment material around gender-identification issues and the experiences of differently-gendered people. Addams and James coached Felicity Huffman for her Academy Award-nominated performance as a transgender woman in the film Transamerica.

At the Sundance debut of Soldier's Girl, Addams met Jane Fonda, whose son Troy Garity had played Winchell. Fonda suggested she mount an all-transgender production of The Vagina Monologues. The production was to contribute funds and help raise awareness of violence against women; it became the subject of the 2006 documentary film Beautiful Daughters.

A reality television series entitled Transamerican Love Story, featuring Addams choosing among eight suitors, debuted February 11, 2008, on Logo TV.

In April 2008, Addams performed alongside Fonda, Glenn Close, Salma Hayek, Alicia Keys, and others in a tenth-anniversary production of The Vagina Monologues at the Louisiana Superdome.

In May 2008, PFLAG (Parents, Families and Friends of Lesbians and Gays) chose Addams as PFLAG's spokesperson for their educational campaign, This Is Our Love Story. Addams said, "I hope This Is Our Love Story will help young transgender people as they come out. By seeing the happy, confident woman I've become, I hope I can act as a role model for these young people at a critical moment in their development." Addams writes a blog on gender issues for Psychology Today.

Addams has released a single entitled "Stunning", available on iTunes. She co-produced the song "The Vagina Song" by Willam Belli, from his debut album The Wreckoning, and made a cameo in the song's music video.

In 2015, Addams appeared in the international premiere of "Trans Scripts" a new play by Paul Lucas at the Edinburgh Festival Fringe in Scotland. The production received 24 four- and five-star reviews, a Fringe First Award, a High Commendation from Amnesty International and was shortlisted for the Feminist Fest Award, the Best of Edinburgh Award, and the Holden Street Theater Award.

== Personal life ==
In 1999, while working as a performer, Addams began dating PFC Barry Winchell. Word of the relationship spread at Winchell's Army base where he was harassed by fellow soldiers and ultimately murdered on July 4, 1999. Winchell's murder and the subsequent trial resulted in widespread press and a formal review of the U.S. "Don't Ask, Don't Tell" (DADT) military policy, ordered by President Bill Clinton. The case became a prominent example used to illustrate the failure of DADT to protect LGBT service members. Addams's and Winchell's romance and the crimes of their abusers are depicted in the film Soldier's Girl, released in 2003. Addams was portrayed by Lee Pace. A subsequent The New York Times article, "An Inconvenient Woman", documented the marginalization and misrepresentation of transgender sexuality even by gay rights activists.

== Works ==
- Calpernia Addams, Mark 947: A Life Shaped by God, Gender, and Force of Will (Writers Club Press, 2002). ISBN 0-595-26376-3
