= Gotham Independent Film Awards 2000 =

Film awards ceremony

10th Annual Gotham Independent Film Awards
- Date: September 20, 2000
- Country: United States
- Presented by: Independent Filmmaker Project
- Hosted by: Jason Alexander

Highlights
- Breakthrough Director: Karyn Kusama – Girlfight
- Website: https://gotham.ifp.org

The 10th Annual Gotham Independent Film Awards, presented by the Independent Filmmaker Project, were held on September 20, 2000 and were hosted by Jason Alexander. At the ceremony, Robert Altman, Michael Barker, Tom Bernard and Marcie Bloom were honored with Career Tributes and Aiyana Elliott received the Anthony Radziwell Documentary Achievement Award.

== Winners and nominees ==
=== Breakthrough Actor ===
- Michelle Rodriguez – Girlfight

=== Breakthrough Director (Open Palm Award) ===
- Karyn Kusama – Girlfight
  - Bruno de Almeida – On the Run
  - Myles Connell – The Opportunists
  - Tom Gilroy – Spring Forward
  - Kenneth Lonergan – You Can Count on Me

=== Anthony Radziwell Documentary Achievement Award ===
- Aiyana Elliott for The Ballad of Ramblin' Jack

=== Classical Film Tribute ===
- Do the Right Thing

=== Career Tributes ===
- Robert Altman
- Michael Barker, Tom Bernard and Marcie Bloom
