= Gotham Independent Film Awards 1996 =

Annual US film awards ceremony

6th Annual Gotham Independent Film Awards
- Date: September 17, 1996
- Country: United States
- Presented by: Independent Filmmaker Project
- Hosted by: Michael Moore

Highlights
- Breakthrough Director: Lisa Krueger – Manny & Lo
- Website: https://gotham.ifp.org

The 6th Annual Gotham Independent Film Awards, presented by the Independent Filmmaker Project, were held on September 17, 1996. At the ceremony, hosted by Michael Moore for the second time, Al Pacino was honored with a Career Tribute with John Sayles, Walter Bernstein and Lee Dichter receiving the other individual awards. The Producer/Industry Executive Award was given to Charles Dolan, founder of Cablevision, and to the founders of the production company Good Machine, Ted Hope and James Schamus.

== Winners ==
=== Breakthrough Director (Open Palm Award) ===
- Lisa Krueger – Manny & Lo

=== Filmmaker Award ===
- John Sayles

=== Writer Award ===
- Walter Bernstein

=== Below-the-Line Award ===
- Lee Dichter, sound mixer

=== Producer/Industry Executive Award ===
- Ted Hope and James Schamus, founders of the Good Machine production company
- Charles Dolan, founder of Cablevision

=== Career Tribute ===
- Al Pacino
