= Gotham Independent Film Awards 1999 =

Annual US film awards ceremony

9th Annual Gotham Independent Film Awards
- Date: September 22, 1999
- Country: United States
- Presented by: Independent Filmmaker Project
- Hosted by: Sandra Bernhard

Highlights
- Breakthrough Director: David Riker – The City
- Website: https://gotham.ifp.org

The 9th Annual Gotham Independent Film Awards, presented by the Independent Filmmaker Project, were held on September 22, 1999 and were hosted by Sandra Bernhard. At the ceremony, Meryl Streep was honored with a Career Tribute, composer Carter Burwell received the Below-the-Line Award and independent film producer Christine Vachon was awarded the Producer/Industry Executive Award.

== Winners and nominees ==
=== Breakthrough Actor ===
- Dylan Baker – Happiness (TIE)
- Janet McTeer – Tumbleweeds (TIE)

=== Breakthrough Director (Open Palm Award) ===
- David Riker – The City
  - Tim Kirkman – Dear Jesse
  - Eric Mendelsohn – Judy Berlin
  - Mark Polish and Michael Polish – Twin Falls Idaho
  - Frank Whaley – Joe the King

=== Classical Film Tribute ===
- Klute

=== Below-the-Line Award ===
- Carter Burwell

=== Producer/Industry Executive Award ===
- Christine Vachon

=== Career Tribute ===
- Meryl Streep
