= Gotham Independent Film Awards 1998 =

Annual US film awards ceremony

8th Annual Gotham Independent Film Awards
- Date: September 23, 1998
- Country: United States
- Presented by: Independent Filmmaker Project
- Hosted by: Stanley Tucci

Highlights
- Breakthrough Director: Darren Aronofsky – Pi
- Website: https://gotham.ifp.org

The 8th Annual Gotham Independent Film Awards, presented by the Independent Filmmaker Project, were held on September 23, 1998, and were hosted by Stanley Tucci. At the ceremony, Sidney Lumet was honored with a Career Tribute, Frances McDormand received the Actor Award, Richard LaGravenese was given the Writer Award and David V. Picker was awarded the Producer/Industry Executive Award.

== Winners and nominees ==
=== Breakthrough Actor ===
- Sonja Sohn – Slam (TIE)
- Saul Williams – Slam (TIE)
  - Norman Reedus – Six Ways to Sunday
  - Sam Rockwell – Lawn Dogs
  - Robin Tunney – Niagara, Niagara

=== Breakthrough Director (Open Palm Award) ===
- Darren Aronofsky – Pi
  - Lisa Cholodenko – High Art
  - Chris Eyre – Smoke Signals
  - Vincent Gallo – Buffalo '66
  - Harmony Korine – Gummo

=== Actor Award ===
- Frances McDormand

=== Writer Award ===
- Richard LaGravenese

=== Producer/Industry Executive Award ===
- David V. Picker

=== Career Tribute ===
- Sidney Lumet
