= Gotham Independent Film Awards 2001 =

Annual US film awards ceremony

11th Annual Gotham Independent Film Awards
- Date: October 1, 2001
- Country: United States
- Presented by: Independent Filmmaker Project
- Hosted by: Andy Dick

Highlights
- Breakthrough Director: Henry Bean – The Believer; John Cameron Mitchell – Hedwig and the Angry Inch
- Website: https://gotham.ifp.org

The 11th Annual Gotham Independent Film Awards, presented by the Independent Filmmaker Project, were held on October 1, 2001 and were hosted by Andy Dick. At the ceremony, Robert De Niro was honored with a Career Tribute, Edet Belzberg received the Anthony Radziwell Documentary Achievement Award and Uma Thurman was awarded the Actor Award. For the first and only time an Independent Vision Award was given out in memory of William J. Nisselson, longtime manager of the post-production studio Sound One Studios in New York who died in 2001 at the age of 56.

== Winners and nominees ==
=== Breakthrough Actor ===
- Yolonda Ross – Stranger Inside

=== Breakthrough Director (Open Palm Award) ===
- Henry Bean – The Believer (TIE)
- John Cameron Mitchell – Hedwig and the Angry Inch (TIE)
  - Michael Cuesta – L.I.E.
  - Daniel Minahan – Series 7: The Contenders
  - Randy Redroad – The Doe Boy
  - David Wain – Wet Hot American Summer

=== Anthony Radziwell Documentary Achievement Award ===
- Edet Belzberg for Children Underground

=== Actor Award ===
- Uma Thurman

=== Independent Vision Award ===
- In Memory of William J. Nisselson

=== Career Tribute ===
- Robert De Niro
