= Spring Forward =

- Theatrical release poster
- Directed by: Tom Gilroy
- Written by: Tom Gilroy
- Produced by: Gill Holland; Jim McKay; Paul S. Mezey
- Starring: Ned Beatty; Liev Schreiber; Campbell Scott; Ian Hart; Peri Gilpin; Bill Raymond; Catherine Kellner; Hallee Hirsh
- Cinematography: Terry Stacey
- Edited by: James Lyons
- Music by: Hahn Rowe
- Production company: Independent Film Channel Productions
- Distributed by: IFC Films
- Release dates: September 1999 (TIFF); December 8, 2000 (United States)
- Running time: 110 minutes
- Country: United States
- Language: English
- Budget: $2 million
- Box office: $117,471

Spring Forward is a 1999 drama film and the directorial debut of Tom Gilroy, starring Ned Beatty, Liev Schreiber and Campbell Scott. Shot in sequence over the course of one year, it was the first film released by IFC Films, the Independent Film Channel's film production and distribution company.

== Plot ==
Spring Forward is the story of the burgeoning friendship between two very different men, Murphy and Paul, who work for the parks department in a quaint New England town. Paul is a short-tempered ex-convict recently released from prison for armed robbery who is exploring his spiritual side hoping for atonement and a second chance. On his first day working in parks maintenance he is partnered with Murphy, a veteran groundskeeper, facing his advancing age and impending retirement. The day gets off to a rough start when Paul clashes with a condescending local business heir over a materials donation, loses his cool, announces he is quitting, and stalks off into the woods berating himself for always ruining everything. Murphy follows him, defuses Paul's outburst and convinces him to stay.

Against the backdrop of the changing seasons the relationship between the men strengthens and develops more as father and son, poignant in contrast to Murphy's relationship with his dying gay son, whose impending death causes Murphy to doubt his past as a father and a man. Working together through days and personal crisis, they share their lives, hopes, ambitions and regrets, as Paul learns to find stability and calm in his life and Murphy achieves acceptance and forgiveness for his mistakes.

The film ends with Paul presenting Murphy with a hamsa as a retirement gift and to signify the "helping hand" that Murphy has provided him through the past year.

== Cast ==
- Ned Beatty as Murph
- Liev Schreiber as Paul
- Campbell Scott as Fredrickson
- Ian Hart as Fran
- Peri Gilpin as Georgia
- Bill Raymond as Don Regan
- Catherine Kellner as Dawn
- Hallee Hirsh as Hope

== Reception ==
The reviews for Spring Forward were mainly favorable, and on review aggregate website Rotten Tomatoes it has a rating of 86% based on 24 reviews.

The film won a third place mention for the Discovery Award honoring Best First Film at the 1999 Toronto International Film Festival. It also won the Gold Award for Independent Theatrical Feature Films (Drama) at the 2000 WorldFest in Houston, as well as the Producer's Award for Paul Mezey at the 2001 Independent Spirit Awards.
