= The Gotham Film & Media Institute =

Nonprofit independent film organization

- Formation: 1979
- Type: Film
- Legal status: Active
- Location: United States
- Key people: Jeffrey Sharp (executive director)
- Website: thegotham.org
- Formerly called: Independent Filmmaker Project (IFP)

The Gotham Film & Media Institute (also simply the Gotham), formerly known as the Independent Filmmaker Project (IFP), is a membership-based, not-for-profit organization dedicated to independent film. It offers programs that assist independent filmmakers in connecting with film-industry professionals and, ultimately, audiences, and presents the annual Gotham Awards.

== History ==
It was founded in 1979 by independent filmmakers as the Independent Filmmaker Project (IFP). Under the IFP umbrella, the New York City organization has over 5,000 members. Affiliated regional organizations are based in Chicago, Minneapolis-Saint Paul, Phoenix, and Seattle. Since March 2019, Jeffrey Sharp has been the executive director of the organization.

In January 2021, the IFP announced its rebranding as the Gotham Film & Media Institute. In March 2026, Portland-based company Laika Studios announced a partnership with the Gotham Film & Media Institute to launch a animation accelerator program to support early and mid-career animators, launching their first class on May 2026 to develop animated short films.
