= Bertha Bay-Sa Pan =

Taiwanese American director, writer and producer

- Born: Bertha Bay-Sa Pan
- Education: Boston University (BA); Columbia University (MFA)
- Years active: 1996–present
- Website: http://www.slewpictures.com/

Bertha Bay-Sa Pan (Chinese: 潘貝思) is a Taiwanese-American director, writer, and producer.

== Early life and education ==
Born in New Jersey and raised in Taiwan, Pan was educated at Boston University (B.A. in film & art) and the Columbia University graduate film school, earning a masters of fine arts degree in directing while working as a sales executive in film distribution. Pan's graduate thesis short film at Columbia University, entitled "Face", garnered various awards from film festivals worldwide, including the Director's Guild Award for Best Asian American Student Filmmaker and the Polo Ralph Lauren Award for Best Screenplay.

== Feature films and television ==
Pan's first feature film was titled Face (like her award-winning graduate thesis short film) and stars Kristy Wu, Bai Ling, Kieu Chinh, Ken Leung, Treach, Will Yun Lee, and Golden Globe Award and Emmy Award nominee Tina Chen. It premiered at the 2002 Sundance Film Festival in the dramatic competition, co-written by Emmy Award winner and Oscar nominee Oren Moverman, featuring a score by Leonard Nelson Hubbard of The Roots and an original theme song written and performed by Naughty By Nature. Other artists on the soundtrack included Mos Def, Pharoahe Monch, Bahamadia, Adriana Evans, Delinquent Habits, Kim Hill (soul musician) of The Black Eyed Peas, and David Tao. Face won a Critics Award for Best Director at the CineVegas film festival, the Audience Award at the GenArt film festival, the Grand Jury Award for Best Director at the Urbanworld film festival, and the Premio Speciale Prize at Festival Internazionale Cinema delle Donne in Turin Italy. Pan was also nominated for the Bingham Ray Breakthrough Director Award at the Gotham Awards. Face was released theatrically in 2005 and received positive reviews from major publications including The New York Times (as a New York Times Critic's Choice), Entertainment Weekly, The Hollywood Reporter, TV Guide, The San Francisco Chronicle, The Star Ledger, The Chicago Tribune, and the BBC..

Pan's second feature, Almost Perfect, stars Kelly Hu, Edison Chen, Ivan Shaw, Tina Chen, Christina Chang, and Olivier and Tony Award winner Roger Rees. It screened at various festivals including The San Francisco International Asian American Film Festival, The Los Angeles Asian Pacific Film Festival (as Centerpiece Film), Hawaii International Film Festival (as American Immigrant Filmmaker in Profile), Friars Club Comedy Film Festival (a Grand Jury nominee), Gwangju International Film Festival (selected as a "Must See Film"), Pune International Film Festival amongst others and was the Opening Night Film of the San Diego Asian Film Festival, the Vancouver Asian Film Festival, and the Boston Asian American Film Festival. Pan also received the Philadelphia Asian American Film Festival's HBO Emerging Filmmaker Award. The film had a limited U.S. theatrical release in 2012, garnering positive reviews from Variety, The San Francisco Examiner, The Honolulu Pulse, among other publications.

Pan's official production company "Slew Pictures" was launched in 2008 and has produced feature films such as Fighting Fish (winner of Best Feature at LA Femme Film Festival. Pan was recognized with the Nashville Film Festival's New Directors Competition Honorable Mention.

Pan was one of 42 women directors of Ava DuVernay's groundbreaking TV series Queen Sugar, executive produced by Oprah Winfrey.

== Short films and music videos ==
Pan's graduate thesis short film, which she made at Columbia University, was similar to her first feature film entitled Face and was awarded a number of accolades, including the Director's Guild Award for Best Asian American Student Filmmaker and the Polo Ralph Lauren Award for Best Screenplay.

Pan has also directed the short films Sluggers starring Hassan Johnson and Corey Parker Robinson; the film played at the Urbanworld Film Festival and the New York International Latino Film Festival), and Lucy in the Sky starring Zoe Margaret Colletti, Catherine Curtin, Danny Burstein, Quinn McColgan, Kelly Hu, and Whoopi Goldberg. It was selected by the Newport Beach Film Festival, Heartland Film's Indy Shorts International Film Festival, Los Angeles Asian Pacific Film Festival, Lighthouse International Film Festival, and Asian American International Film Festival, and others, and segments of Wang Leehom's 3D concert film Open Fire premiered at Toronto International Film Festival.

Pan has directed music videos for Slimkid3's of ( The Pharcyde) "Just Can't Hold" (a BET-Soul Top Ten Rotation), Chris Trapperof The Push Stars) "Wish I Was Cool", "Look What The Wind Blew In," and Princess Katie and Racer Steve's "Sand in My Sandwich".

== Filmography ==
Short film

Year	Title	Director	Writer	Producer
1997	Face	Yes	Yes	Yes
2001	Sluggers	Yes	Yes	Co-Producer
2017	Norman Pinski Come Home	No	No	Executive Producer
2018	Lucy in the Sky	Yes	No	No
2024	Gary Jr.	Yes	No	Yes

Feature film

Year	Title	Director	Writer	Producer
2002	Face	Yes	Yes	Yes
2010	Fighting Fish	No	No	Yes
2011	Almost Perfect	Yes	Yes	Yes
2016	Wang Leehom's Open Fire 3D Concert Film	Segment	No	No

Music Video

Year	Title	Artist
2005	Just Can't Hold On	Tre Hardson (aka Slimkid3)
2007	Wish I Was Cool	Chris Trapper
2010	Look What The Wind Blew In	Chris Trapper
2010	Sand in My Sandwich	Princess Katie and Racer Steve
