= Ivan Shaw =

American actor

- Born: Taipei, Taiwan
- Education: University of California, Los Angeles
- Occupation: Actor

Ivan Shaw is an American actor who made his daytime debut in December 2002, playing young Henry Chin in the ABC daytime show All My Children.

== Early life and education ==
Shaw moved from Taipei, Taiwan, to Upland, California, at age 4, where he grew up with his older brother, Eugene, who is also an aspiring actor, and their grandparents. He was a member of the Upland Chinese Presbyterian Church for some time.

Shaw attended Upland High School and later UCLA, where he studied mathematics, economics, and computer science.

== Career ==
Shaw played lead roles in the off-Broadway production of Savage Love at New York City's Century Theatre and A Boy's Life at Shurin Studio, both of which received critical acclaim.

He went on to make a series of appearances on TV shows such as Haunted (as Tommy), CSI: NY (as Billy James), Charmed (as Attendant), The Closer (as Donnie), Monk (as a Rap Producer), The Mind of the Married Man (as Machiko), All My Children (as Henry Chin), General Hospital (as a Band Member), The Young and the Restless (as Alan), and Baywatch Hawaii. Shaw later appeared as Adam Webster on the short-lived and controversial NBC show The Book of Daniel.

Shaw has also appeared in feature films such as Get Him to the Greek (as a Pinnacle Executive), L!fe Happens (as Ivan #2), The Truth About Angels (as JC), and Rush Hour 2 (as a Triad Gangster). He also played the role of Tao in the short film Mission Chinese, directed by David Parker and Cole Schreiber (also known as Sunday Paper), and starring Ron Yuan and Elaine Tan.

In 2011, Shaw starred as the romantic lead opposite Kelly Hu in Bertha Bay-Sa Pan's feature film Almost Perfect, which also featured Edison Chen, Tina Chen, Roger Rees, and Christina Chang.

He has also been the associate producer for a film, The Time Being, starring Frank Langella and Wes Bentley, and directed by Nenad Cicin-Sain, which made its premiere at the 2012 Toronto International Film Festival. He also co-wrote a short film titled The Tip with Kelvin Yu, which was directed by Tyler Brooks.

== Selected filmography ==
=== Film ===
Year	Title	Role	Notes
2020	Nocturne	Dr. Henry Cask	
2014	Nightmare Code	Alex Chou	
2014	2 Bedroom 1 Bath	Peter	
2012	The Time Being	Officer	
2012	Mission Chinese	Tao	Short
2011	Life Happens	Ivan #2	
2011	Almost Perfect	Dwayne Sung	
2010	Get Him to the Greek	Pinnacles Executive	
2001	Rush Hour 2	Triad Gangster	Uncredited

=== Television ===
Year	Title	Role	Notes
2023	Dear Edward	Steve	Main role
2022	That Dirty Black Bag	Kurt	Main role
2022	The Cleaning Lady	Marco de la Rosa	Recurring role
2016	Insecure	Justin	Recurring role (season 1)
2016	Better Things	John	Episode: "Woman Is the Something of the Something"
2016	Sillicon Valley	Ad Exec	Episode: "Daily Active Users"
2015	Chasing Life	Joaquin	Episode: "First Person"
2014	Rizzoli & Isles	Chef Holden	Episode: "Food for Thought"
2013	NCIS	Victor Cheng	Episode: "Whiskey Tango Foxtrot"
2012	Sketchy	Allen	
2010	CSI: NY	Billy James	Episode: "Sanguine Love"
2008	The Young and the Restless	Alan	2 episodes
2007	Monk	Rap Producer	Episode: "Mr. Monk and the Rapper"
2007	CSI: Crime Scene Investigation	Bus Boy	Episode: "Meet Market"
2006	The Book of Daniel	Adam Webster	Main role
2006	The Closer	Donnie	Episode: "Critical Missing"
2004	The Division	Lee	Episode: "That's Them"
2003	All My Children	Henry Chin	4 episode
2002	Haunted	Tommy	Episode: "Nexus"
2002	Charmed	Attendant	Episode: "The Eyes Have It"
2002	The Mind of the Married Man	Machiko	Episode: "Peter Pan"
2002	General Hospital	Band Member	1 episode
