= Tyrus =

Tyrus may refer to:

People:

- Tyrus (wrestler) (born 1973), American professional wrestler and Fox News contributor
- Ty Cobb (1886–1961), American Hall-of-Fame Major League Baseball player
- Tyrus McCloud (born 1974), American former National Football League player
- Tyrus McGee (born 1991), American basketball player in the Israel Basketball Premier League
- Tyrus Thomas (born 1986), American retired National Basketball Association player
- Tyrus Thompson (born 1991), American National Football League player
- Ty Treadway (born 1967), American television host
- Tyrus Wheat (born 1999), American football player
- Tyrus Wong (1910–2016), Chinese-born American artist and Disney illustrator

Other uses:

- Tyrus (Phoenicia), Latin name of the ancient Phoenician city of Tyre
- Tyrus (beetle), a genus of ant-loving beetles
- Tyrus, a European strategy game
- Tyrus Kitt, a fictional character on the television series Breaking Bad and Better Call Saul
- Tyrus, the planet from which the aliens come in the 1988 American miniseries Invasion America
- Tyrus (film), a documentary about Tyrus Wong
