= Tyrus (film) =

- Directed by: Pamela Tom
- Written by: Pamela Tom
- Produced by: Pamela Tom; Gwen Wynne; Tamara Khalaf
- Cinematography: Shana Hagan
- Edited by: Carl Pfirman; Tim Craig; Walt Louie; Angela Park
- Music by: Derek Baird
- Release dates: September 8, 2015; Telluride Film Festival
- Running time: 78 minutes
- Country: United States
- Language: English

Tyrus is a 2015 feature-length documentary directed by Pamela Tom about the Chinese American artist Tyrus Wong, whose paintings became the inspiration for the classic animated feature Bambi.

== Synopsis ==
Tyrus Wong immigrates to the U.S. from Guangzhou as a boy. Though living in poverty, his father, encourages Wong's unique talent for drawing. Inspired by the art of the Song dynasty and abstract Western painters like Picasso and Whistler, Wong employed simple brushstrokes, using watercolors and pastels, to create lush forests and green meadows. His philosophy of abstraction (fewer strokes) allowed him to connect with viewers' imaginations, as his work would suggest images while viewers' minds would fill in the rest. His work eventually caught the eye of Walt Disney, who hired Wong as an illustrator at Walt Disney Studios. Wong's style became the blueprint for the visual look and feel of the film of Bambi, constituting all its background art. After an abrupt dismissal from Disney, Wong would go on to become a fine artist, a storyboard artist, and muralist as a means of providing for providing for his family; however, he became a kite designer to fulfill himself artistically. Wong's storyboards helped set the tone and drama for films such as Sands of Iwo Jima (1949), Rebel Without a Cause (1955), William Goldman's Harper (1966) and Sam Peckinpah's The Wild Bunch. Despite working as in Hollywood for nearly 30 years, the racist attitudes of the time prevented his contributions from being acknowledged until the 21st century. Wong died at the age of 106 on December 30, 2016, the oldest-known living Chinese American artist at the time of his death. He is now widely regarded, at Disney Studios and among illustrator communities, as "a Legend."

== Production ==
Pamela Tom was inspired to make Tyrus after watching Bambi with her daughter. In the behind-the-scenes documentary that followed, she learned of Wong:

...the animators kept referring to this Chinese American artist named Tyrus Wong. I thought, 'A Chinese American artist in the 1930s? I need to find out more about this person.'

Tyrus was produced by Tom, Gwen Wynne, and Tamara Khalaf.

== Release ==
Tyrus premiered on September 8, 2015, at the Telluride Film Festival. It had its U.S. national release on September 8, 2017, as a part of PBS's long-running series, American Masters. The film has screened at numerous film festivals across the world.

== Critical reception ==
Good Docs labeled the film a "tour-de-force."

=== Awards ===
| Date | Festival | Award |
|---|---|---|
| 2016 | Seattle Asian American Film Festival | Audience Choice Award |
| 2016 | Philadelphia Asian American Film Festival | Best Feature Documentary |
| 2016 | Boston Asian American Film Festival | Audience Award |
| 2016 | Cinetopia | Best Director in Feature Documentary |
| 2016 | Newport Beach Film Festival | Audience Award |
| 2016 | DisOrient Film Festival | Best Feature Documentary |
| 2016 | Los Angeles Asian Pacific Film Festival | Special Jury Award |
| 2016 | Hawaii International Film Festival | Audience Award |
| 2016 | San Diego Asian Film Festival | Audience Award |
| 2016 | Boston Asian American Film Festival | Audience Award |

=== Press ===
Sightlines Magazine – "Creativity Will Out: Seven Arts Documentaries To Watch"

AARP – "Influential Asian American & Pacific Islander Movies"

Phoenix Magazine – "Film Review: Tyrus at No Festival Required"

Eugene Weekly – "Bambi's Secret"

Parade – "American Masters to Showcase the Life and Work of Tyrus Wong, Disney Animator and Artist"

My Modern Met – "Tyrus Wong, the Chinese-American Artist of Disney's "Bambi" Finally Gets Recognition He Deserves"

LA Times – "Newport film fest's 'Bambi' provides inspiration for 'Tyrus' documentary"

Orlando Sentinel – "'Bambi' turns 75; PBS salutes unsung artist"

Animation Magazine – "Tyrus Wong Documentary Premieres on PBS September 8"

Hyperallergic – "A Documentary on Tyrus Wong, a Long-Ignored Illustrator for Disney and Warner Bros"

Cartoon Brew – "PBS To Air Documentary About 'Bambi' Production Designer Tyrus Wong (Watch Trailer)"

KTLA – "New PBS Documentary About Tyrus Wong, Chinese American Artist Behind Disney's Bambi"

CAAM Media – "'Tyrus' Documentary Airs on American Masters Sept 8"

NonFiction Film – "director Pamela Tom On Her Tyrus Wong Doc: Centenarian Artist 'Transforms Ugliness Into Beauty'"

Huffington Post – "Tyrus Wong, The 'Bambi' Artist Who Endured America's Racism, Gets His Due"

CBS – Sunday Morning – "'Bambi' artist Tyrus Wong"

Slate – "A New Documentary Celebrates the Life of Tyrus Wong, Bambi'sOverlooked Innovator"

Front Row Center – "American Masters Celebrates Bambi Artist Tyrus Wong"

Artsy – "Why the Artist behind Disney's 'Bambi' Still Influences Animators Today"

CAAM Media – "'TYRUS' Film Shines the Spotlight on the Chinese American Behind 'BAMBI'"

Dig In – CAAMFest Opening Night: TYRUS & Red Carpet Interviews

CAAM Media – "Memoirs of a Superfan Vol. 11.5 – A Flower Grows"

KQED – "A Background Artist Comes to the Fore in CAAMFest's 'Tyrus'"

SF Chronicle – "CAAMFest makes bold to bring filmgoers to Mission"

SF Examiner – "Rich, varied program for CAAMFest 2016 opens with TYRUS"

Filmmaker Magazine – TYRUS at HIFF

SDAFF – "Tyrus Wong…More Than a Brushstroke of Genius"

San Diego Tribune – "Broad Scope at San Diego Asian Film Fest"

Awards Daily – "Oscar Contenders Emerging Out of Telluride"

Awards Daily – "Top Five Films I Missed At Telluride"

KCET – Artbound – "Chinese Brushstrokes in Hollywood: The Works of Tyrus Wong"

Smithsonian Magazine – "How Disney's 1942 Film Bambi Came to be Influenced by the Lush Landscapes of the Sung Dynasty"
