= Boston Asian American Film Festival =

Film festival

- Established: 2008

Boston Asian American Film Festival (BAAFF), a co-production of the Asian American Resource Workshop (AARW) and ArtsEmerson, includes a program of independent cinema highlighting recent, significant works by and/or about Asian Americans and the Asian diaspora. BAAFF is New England's largest Asian American film festival. The festival takes place in the month of October in Boston at Emerson College's Bright Family Screening Room in the Paramount Center and opening night in Cambridge at the Brattle Theatre and/or Coolidge Corner Theatre. The film festival features special premieres, exclusive Q&As with filmmakers and various co-sponsored events around Boston.

The festival was officially established in 2008 by Founding Festival Director, Susan Chinsen.

== History ==
BAAFF existed for several decades under the name Asian American Resource Workshop, but finally established its current name in 2008 under the leadership of Susan Chinsen. In 2018, the festival hit its 10-year anniversary, commemorated by 10 days of screenings.

== Previous Screenings ==
Notable films that have screened at BAAFF starting from 2010 include Bertha Bay-Sa Pan's Almost Perfect, Quentin Lee's White Frog and The People I've Slept With, Michael Kang's Knots, Byron Q's Bang Bang, Minh Duc Nguyen's Touch, Jeff Chiba Stearns's One Big Hapa Family, and a special event honoring veteran actor James Hong entitled "James Hong, Behind the Scenes Secrets of Hollywood."

=== 2025, October 16-26 ===
Films & Guests in attendance

- OPENING NIGHT Forge | Q&A with Director Jing Ai Ng, Actors Andie Ju & Brandon Soohoo
- CENTERPIECE Love, Chinatown | Q&A with Director Lukas Dong, Cynthia Yee, Gwen Liu
- CLOSING NIGHT Mustache | Q&A with Director Imran J. Khan, Actors Rizwan Manji & Melody Cao (Moderated by Priya Giri Desai, Principal, Illumin Media)
- Rosemead | Q&A with Producer Mynette Louie (Moderated by Colleen Nguyen, Executive Director, Asian Women for Health)
- Year of the Cat | Q&A with Director Tony Nguyen (Moderated by AnnaMarie Vu, Clinical Assistant Professor, Family Medicine Tufts University)
- Between Goodbyes | Q&A with Adoptees Nicole Eigbrett, AARW Co-ED in conversation with Kathy Eow, Cultural Leader.
- The Rose: Come Back to Me | Q&A with Director Eugene Yi (Moderated by Dr. Ray Seol, Assistant Professor, Berklee College of Music)
- Can I Get a Witness? | Q&A with Director Ann Marie Fleming, Actor Keira Jang (Moderated by Trish Fontanilla Co-Founder and Chief Energy Officer of BOSFilipinos)

=== 2018, October 18–28 ===
- Retrospective screening for the 25th anniversary of The Joy Luck Club directed by Wayne Wang
- Deported, directed by Sahra V Nguyen. Post screening Q&A with director Sahra V Nguyen.
- Fiction & Other Realities, directed by Bobby Choy
- For Izzy, directed by Alex Chu
- Bitter Melon, directed by H.P. Mendoza
- Go For Broke: An Origin Story, directed by Alexcander Bocchieri
- Nailed It, directed by Adele Free Pham
- The Ito Sisters

=== 2017, October 19–22 ===
- The Jade Pendant directed by Po-Chih Leung. Post screening Q&A with author/producer L.P. Leung and actor Brian Yang
- Resistance at Tule Lake directed by Konrad Aderer. Post screening Q&A with director/producer Konrad Aderer
- Gook directed by Justin Chon. Post screening Q&A with producer Alex Chi

=== 2016, October 20–23 ===
- Tyrus directed by Pamela Tom. Post screening Q&A with the director.
- Comfort directed by William Lu. Post screening Q&A with director William Lu and actor Chris Dinh
- The Tiger Hunter directed by Lena Khan

=== 2015, October 22–25 ===
- Seoul Searching directed by Benson Lee
- The Killing Fields of Dr. Haing S. Ngor directed by Arthur Dong
- Miss India America directed by Ravi Kapoor

=== 2013, October 24–27 ===
- 20th Anniversary of Wedding Banquet with director Ang Lee

Linsanity with producer Brian Yang

- Innocent Blood with producer Trip Hope
- The Way We Dance with director Adam Wong

=== 2012, October 25–28 ===
- White Frog drama feature directed by Ellie Wen. Guest Appearance and Q&A with Actor Booboo Stewart, Producer/Writer Ellie Wen and Executive Producer David Henry Hwang. Special Lion Dance Performance by Wah Lum Martial Arts Academy
- Sunset Stories drama feature directed by Ernesto Foronda, Silas Howard.
- Wedding Palace Comedy feature directed by Christine Yoo
- I Am A Ghost (Boston Premiere) Horror feature directed by H.P Mendoza. Screened at Somerville Theatre.
- Fear Buffet: A Shorts Program Featuring Dumpling (dir. Wesley Du), How War Ends (dir. Scott Eriksson), Fortune Cookie Magic Trick (dir. Alex Chu), Mr. Nakamura's Addiction (dir. Scott Eriksson), Bloodtraffick (dir. Jennifer Thym) and Down Under (dir. Ray Arthur Wang)
- Pui Chan: Kung Fu Pioneer (New England Premiere) documentary directed by Mimi Chan
- Model Minority (New England Premiere) Directed by Lily Mariye.
- Mr. Cao Goes To Washington (Boston Premiere) Directed by S. Leo Chiang.
- Yes, We're Open (Boston Premiere) Directed by Richard Wong.
- Reel Food: A Shorts Program Featuring Wonder Boy (dir. Corrie Chen), People Aren't All Bad (dir. Matthew Hashiguchi), The Commitment (dir. Albert M. Chan), Bleached (dir. Jessica Dela Merced), Café Eleve (dir. Kelly Li), My 2009 Experience (dir. Henry Ho), Commitment (dir. Raahul Singh) and Nani (dir. Justin Tipping) Special Appearance by filmmakers Henry Ho (dir. My 2009 Experience), Albert Chan (dir. The Commitment), and Kelly Li (dir, Café Eleve).
- Shanghai Calling (Boston Premiere), directed by Daniel Hsia.

=== 2011, November 10–13 ===
- Almost Perfect (Boston Premiere) Post-screening Q&A with director Bertha Bay-Sa Pan, actor Tina Chen, opening Performance by The Genki Spark: Taiko Projects with Attitude
- Behind the Scenes Secrets of Hollywood Actor James Hong. Co-presented by MIT Asian American Association, MIT Inventing Our Future, WGBH and Chinese Historical Society of New England (CHSNE)
- Shorts:The Potential Wives of Norman Mao, Angel Island Profile: Tyrus Wong, Asian American Jesus, Wear I Fit, The Bus Pass, Brides Wanted, Room #11, Lunchtime, and Mother. Co-presented by MIT Asian American Association, MIT Inventing Our Future, Queer East, Boston LGBT Film Festival, and Channel APA.
- One Big Hapa Family (documentary directed by Jeff Chiba Stearns) Post-screening Q&A with director Jeff Chiba Stearns Co-presented by New England Japanese American Citizens League and Discover Roxbury.
- Touch, directed by Minh Duc Nguyen) Post-screening Q&A with director Minh Duc Nguyen. Co-presented by Viet AID and Intercollegiate Vietnamese Students Association. Preceded by short, Heart directed by Erick Oh.
- Shorts program includes: Fatakra, A Tree Falls in Forest, Ballet of Unhatched Chicks, Boys and Girls, The First Draft of Yao Ming's Retirement Speech, Memory of Forgotten War, My Name is Seven, N as in Name: Danh Nguyen, Rehearsing the Future, and Top Spin. Co-presented by MIT Asian American Association, MIT Inventing Our Future, Queer East, and Boston LGBT Film Festival.
- Knots, directed by Michael Kang Post-screening Q&A with Director Michael Kang and Writer/Actor Kimberly-Rose Wolter Co-presented by Boston Korea.

=== 2010, November 11–14 ===
- Today's Special, Co-presented by the National Association of Asian American Professionals (NAAAP)-Boston, Opening Performance by The Genki Spark: Taiko Projects with Attitude
- Aoki, directed by Mike Cheng, Ben Wang, Infamy, directed by Kevin Senzaki, Co-Presented by Discover Roxbury, Boston Center for Community and Justice, and New England Japanese American Citizen League.
- Shorts: When Five Fell, Humberville Poetry Slam, Clap Clap, Andy Topi, Master of His Domain, Space Cadet, Ajumma! Are you Krazy???, Co-Presented by Korean Student Association at UMASS Boston, Boston Progress, and Boston Chinatown Neighborhood Center (BCNC), and the National Association of Asian American Professionals (NAAAP)- Boston.
- Race, Acting, Sexuality, and Asian American Masculinities, Co-Presented by Coalition for Asian Pacific American Youth (CAPAY) and Institute for Asian American Studies at UMASS Boston
- The People I've Slept With, directed by Quentin Lee, Co-Presented by Harvard AAA, Boston Asian American Student Intercollegiate Conference (BAASIC), and the National Association of Asian American Professionals (NAAAP)- Boston.
- The Things We Carry, La Petite Salon, Co-Presented by Asian Sisters Participating In Reaching Excellence (ASPIRE), The Asian American Center at Northeastern University, and Boston University's Asian Women's Health Initiative Project (AWSHIP).
