= Tyrus Wong =

American artist (1910-2016)

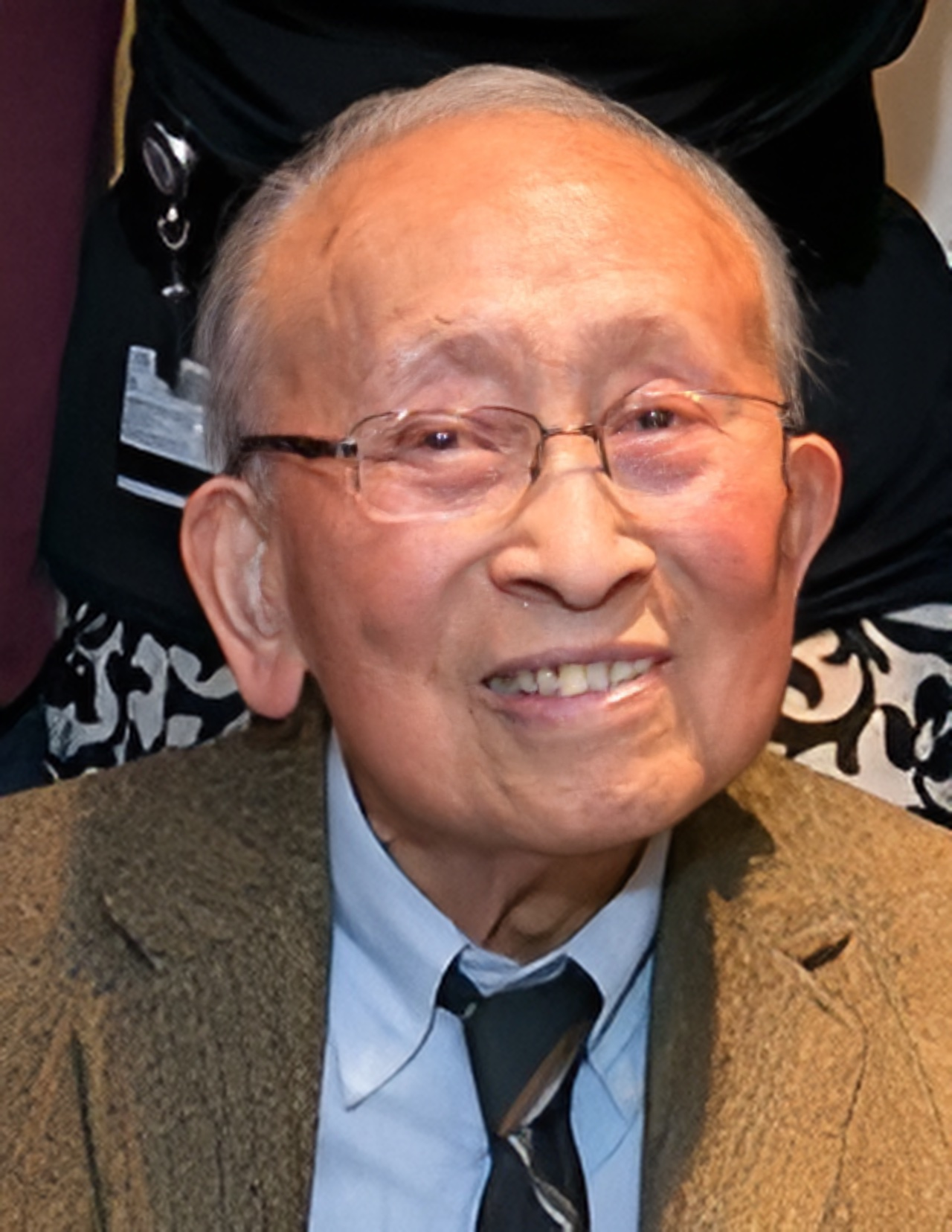
- Wong in 2014
- Born: Wong Gen Yeo; October 25, 1910; Taishan, Guangdong, China
- Died: December 30, 2016 (aged 106); Los Angeles, California, U.S.
- Resting place: Forest Lawn Memorial Park, Los Angeles, U.S.
- Other names: Tyrus Yu Wong, Look Tai Yow
- Education: Otis College of Art and Design
- Occupations: Painter, animator, calligrapher, muralist, ceramicist, lithographer, set designer, artist, storyboard artist, kite maker
- Years active: 1930s-2016
- Employer(s): Walt Disney Productions (1938–1941); Warner Bros. Cartoons (1941-1964); Walter Lantz Productions (1941-1968); MGM Cartoons (1941-1958); Warner Bros. Pictures (1942–1968); Hanna-Barbera (1957-1968); DePatie-Freleng Enterprises (1963-1968)
- Works: Bambi (1942)
- Spouse: Ruth Kim (m. 1937, died 1995)
- Children: 3
- Awards: CAM Historymakers Award, 2001; Disney Legends Award, 2001; Winsor McCay Award, 2005

Chinese name
- Traditional Chinese: 黃齊耀
- Simplified Chinese: 黄齐耀
Transcriptions
Standard Mandarin
- Hanyu Pinyin: Huáng Qíyào
Yue: Cantonese
- Yale Romanization: Wong Chaiyiu

Signature
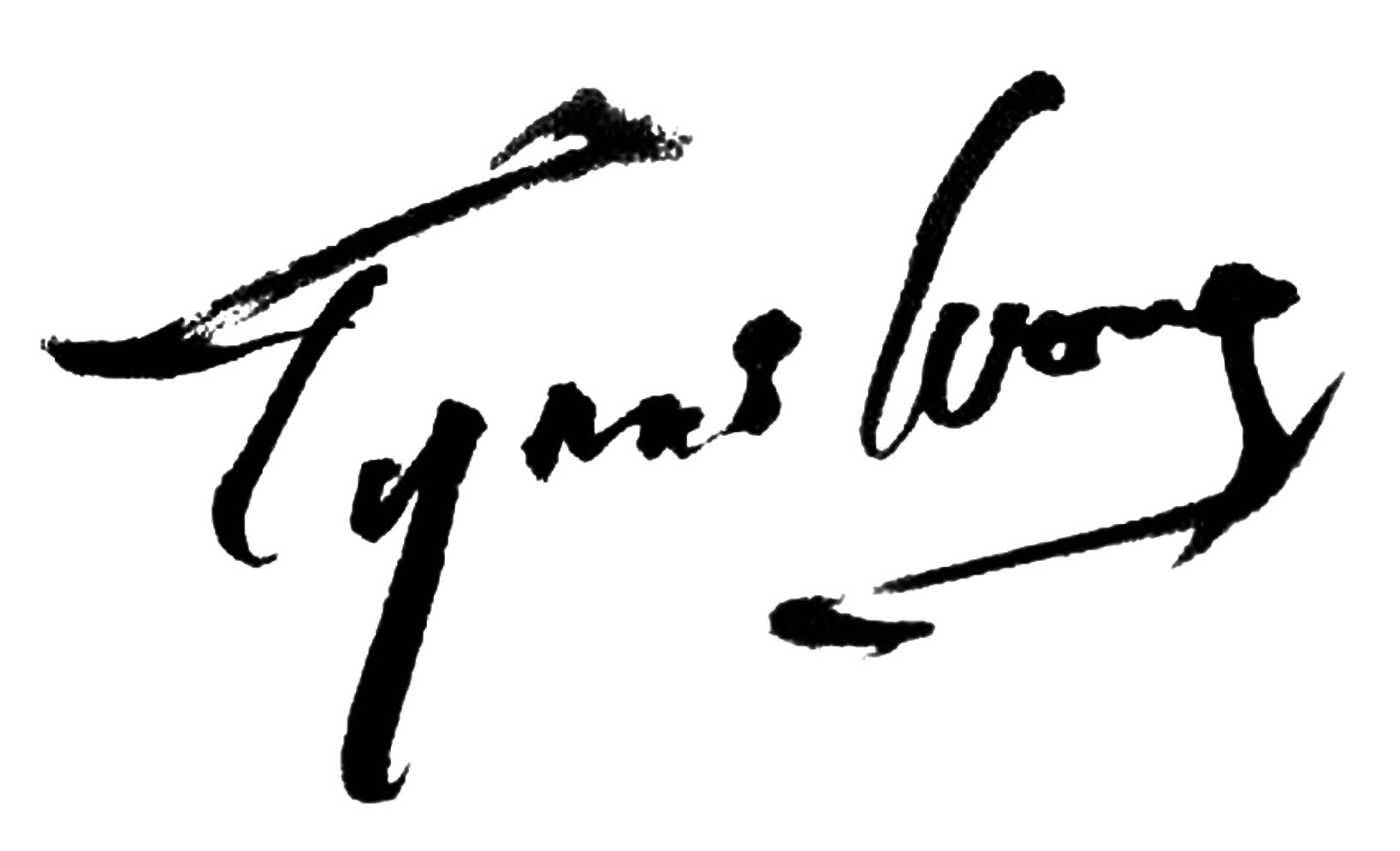

Tyrus Wong (born Wong Gen Yeo (Note: Chinese: 黄齐耀; pinyin: Huáng Qíyào); October 25, 1910 – December 30, 2016) was a Chinese-born American artist. He was a painter, animator, calligrapher, muralist, ceramicist, lithographer and kite maker, as well as a set designer and storyboard artist.

One of the most-influential and celebrated Asian-American artists of the 20th century, Wong was also a film production illustrator, who worked for Disney and Warner Bros. He was a muralist for the Works Progress Administration (WPA), as well as a greeting card artist for Hallmark Cards. Most notably, he was the lead production illustrator on Disney's 1942 film Bambi, taking inspiration from Song dynasty art. He also served in the art department of many films, either as a set designer or storyboard artist, such as Rebel Without a Cause (1955), Around the World in 80 Days (1956), Rio Bravo (1959), The Music Man (1962), PT 109 (1963), The Great Race (1965), Harper (1966), The Green Berets (1968), and The Wild Bunch (1969), among others.

Wong retired from the film industry in the late 1960s but continued his work as an artist, spending most of his time designing kites. He also continued to paint, sketch, and design ceramics well into his 90s. He was the subject of a 2015 documentary film, Tyrus, by filmmaker Pamela Tom (譚宇瓊). Wong died on December 30, 2016, at the age of 106.

== Early life ==
On October 25, 1910, Wong was born as Wong Gen Yeo (Chinese: 黄齐耀; pinyin: Huáng Qíyào), in Taishan, Guangdong, China. Wong's father was "Ben" Wong Sy Po (1871-1935). Wong's mother was Lee See.

On December 30, 1919, Wong and his father boarded the ship S.S. China and sailed to California, U.S. In 1920, when he was nine years old, Wong and his father immigrated to the United States, and never again came into contact with his mother and sister. Wong was initially held at the Angel Island Immigration Station due to the Chinese Exclusion Act. There he was separated from his father while he waited to be questioned about his identity. Because most Chinese immigration was prohibited un()der the Chinese Exclusion Act, Wong and his father had to immigrate illegally under assumed identities as "paper sons" of Chinese American sponsors. Wong's paper son name was Look Tai Yow. He did not gain American citizenship until 1946, after the repeal of the Exclusion Act. After a month, Wong was released from Angel Island. Wong and his father initially relocated to Sacramento. Wong and his father later moved the family to Los Angeles.

Wong's art was encouraged by his father who had him practice calligraphy every night, since they could not afford to give him an art education. While attending Benjamin Franklin Junior High in Pasadena, Wong's teachers noticed his artistic ability and he received a summer scholarship at the Otis Art Institute. Wong decided to leave junior high for a full-time scholarship at Otis. Wong's father survived on a more modest income, and Wong worked as a janitor at Otis College. He walked for miles to attend classes. He graduated from Otis in 1930 and began working in Hollywood. While the alumnus page gives Wong's graduation year as 1932, the introduction to a video interview sponsored by the school refers to his attendance as much earlier. As early as 1933, a Los Angeles newspaper reported that a local art gallery was presenting a one-man show by Wong featuring "monotype drawings and etchings."

== Career ==
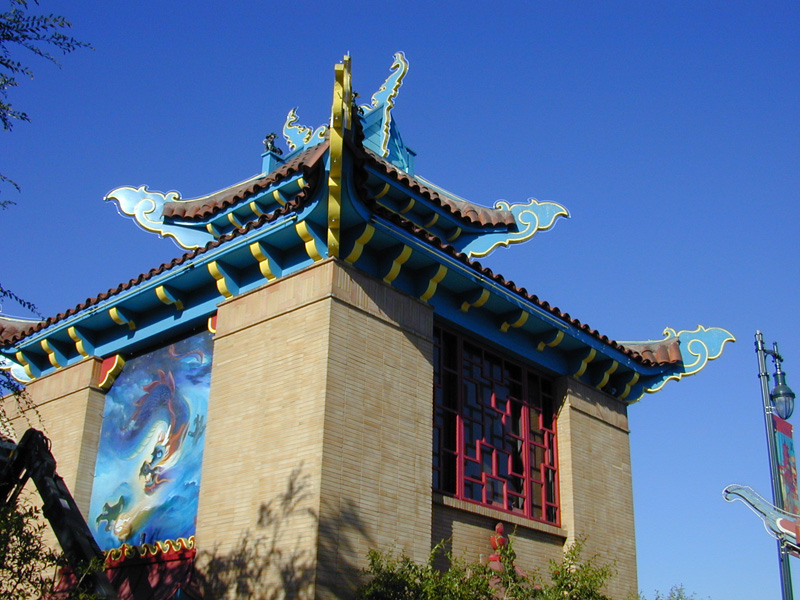
The dragon mural in L.A. Chinatown painted by Tyrus Wong and restored by Fu Ding Cheng (1984)

Wong's career ranged from working as a Hallmark greeting card designer, to being a Warner Bros. film production illustrator (1942–1968), including drawing set designs and storyboards for several movies, and an inspirational sketch artist (1938–1941) for Disney.

It was his lush pastels that served as inspiration for Bambi (1942), where he was the lead artist of the project. His background paintings for Bambi were inspired by Song dynasty classical Chinese paintings. Although credited as one of several background illustrators, his full contribution to the film was largely unknown for several decades.

Shortly after finishing Bambi, Wong was fired from Disney studios as a consequence of the Disney animators' strike. After leaving Disney, Wong worked at Warner Brothers Studios for 26 years as a production illustrator.

Later, he designed popular greeting cards for Hallmark Cards. After retiring from film work in 1968, Wong turned his skills to making colorful kites (usually animals such as pandas, goldfish, or centipedes). He spent his Saturdays flying his creations on the beach just north of the Santa Monica Pier.

Some of his well-known paintings include Self Portrait (late 1920s), Fire (1939), Reclining Nude (1940s), East (1984) and West (1984). He told an interviewer that he attributes his success to luck and hard work.

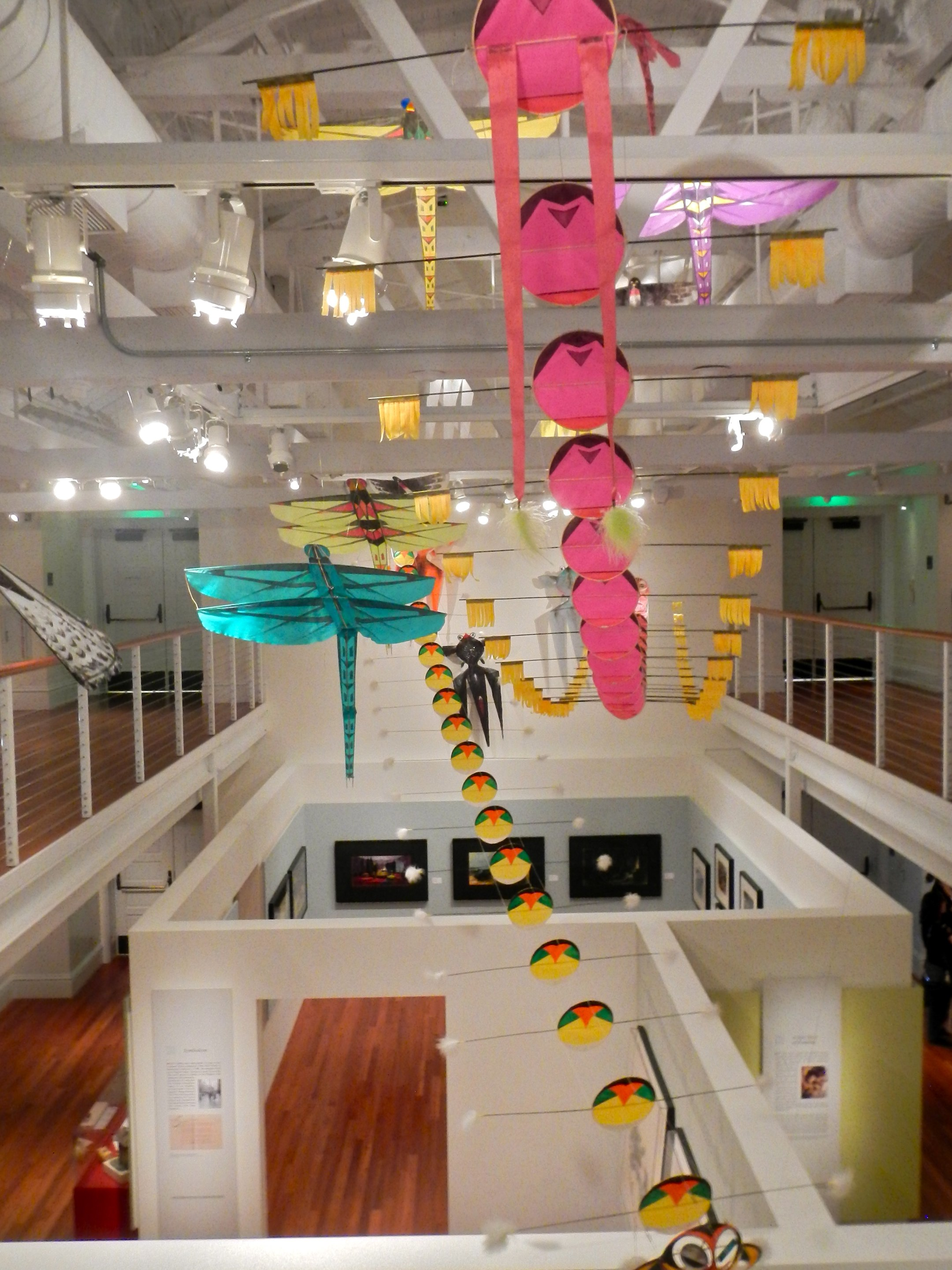
A display of Wong's kites and other artwork at the Walt Disney Family Museum (2013)

=== Exhibitions ===
The first solo exhibition of Wong's artwork, "Mid-Century Mandarin: The Clay Canvasses of Tyrus Wong," curated by Bill Stern, was organized by the Museum of California Design. It focused on his paintings on dinnerware for Winfield China of Pasadena, California, in the 1940s and 50s, and was presented at Craft and Folk Art Museum (CAFAM) in Los Angeles, July 14 through October 31, 2004.

The Tyrus Wong: A Retrospective exhibit at the Chinese American Museum in Los Angeles, California showcased his work in October–December 2004. According to the museum:

This exhibit showcased the works of Tyrus Wong, who at the age of 93, is one of the earliest and most influential Chinese American artists in the United States. In his long, pioneering career as a local artist, Wong is a seasoned painter, muralist, ceramicist, lithographer, designer, and kite maker. The exhibit also featured Wong's imaginative kites, which he has been building and flying for the past 30 years. Drawn from public and private collections, several of the pieces chosen for this exhibition have not been shown publicly since the 1930s.

In 2007, Wong was one of three illustrators featured in The Art of the Motion Picture Illustrator: William B. Major, Harold Michelson and Tyrus Wong, an exhibit in the Academy of Motion Picture Arts and Sciences's Grand Lobby Gallery in Beverly Hills.

Tyrus Wong is one of the founders of the otherwise all-Black artists collective Eleven Associated Artists (later Art West Association). The short lived Los Angeles artists co-op included Wong and African American contemporaries Beulah Woodard, Alice Taylor Gafford and William Pajaud.

Wong's work was featured in "Now Dig This!: Art and Black Los Angeles 1960–1980" an exhibition at the Hammer Museum, October 2011 – January 2012. The exhibition explored the work of African American art pioneers and the multicultural friendships and collaborations that helped define Los Angeles art and creative communities of the period.

His work was also included in the Round the Clock: Chinese American Artists Working in Los Angeles exhibit at the East Los Angeles College Vincent Price Art Museum, January–May 2012.

From August 2013 through February 2014, Wong's work was exhibited at The Walt Disney Family Museum in San Francisco, California in a career retrospective entitled: Water to Paper, Paint to Sky: The Art Of Tyrus Wong. A hardcover book was published by the Walt Disney Family Foundation Press in conjunction with the exhibit.

In 2015, Wong was featured in an eight-decade career retrospective, Water to Paper, Paint to Sky: The Art of Tyrus Wong, at the Museum of Chinese in America in Manhattan, New York City.

== Personal life ==
Wong met Ruth Ng Kim (伍梅珍), a second-generation Chinese American from a farming family in Bakersfield, California, at Dragon's Den Restaurant in the Chinatown section of Los Angeles, where she was a waitress. They married on June 27, 1937, in Bakersfield. Wong's wife was the secretary to Y.C. Hong, the first Chinese American immigration lawyer, and then became a homemaker after the birth of their children. They had three married daughters: Kay (born 1938), Tai-Ling (born 1943), and Kim (born 1949) and two grandsons, Kevin Fong and Jason Fong. Wong's wife, Ruth Kim Wong, died on January 12, 1995, at the age of 85.

=== Death ===
Wong died in the Sunland-Tujunga neighborhood of Los Angeles on December 30, 2016, at the age of 106. Wong is interred at Forest Lawn Memorial Park (Hollywood Hills) in Los Angeles.

== Legacy ==
Throughout his artistic career, Wong garnered a multitude of awards. Notable awards include the awards from the following organizations:

- Induction into the Disney Legends Hall of Fame
- Induction into the Art Director's Guild Hall of Fame
- The Hope of Los Angeles Award
- The Lifetime Achievement Award from the Museum of Chinese in America
- The Lifetime Achievement Award at the 22nd Annual Excellence in Production Design Awards.

On February 1, 2017, Wong was honored by Congressman Adam Schiff with a remembrance on the floor of the 115th United States Congress — where Schiff's remarks on Tyrus were read into the Congressional Record.

On his would-be 108th birthday on October 25, 2018, Tyrus Wong's life and legacy were honored by an animated Google Doodle.

== In popular culture ==
- In 2015, filmmaker Pamela Tom wrote and directed a feature documentary film about Tyrus Wong's life, entitled Tyrus.
  After premiering at the 42nd annual Telluride Film Festival in 2015, Tyrus garnered numerous awards and accolades. In 2015, the film received the Audience Award at the Hawaii International Film Festival and the San Diego Asian Film Festival. In 2016, Tyrus received the Audience Award at the Boston Asian American Film Festival, the Audience Choice Award at the Seattle Asian American Film Festival and the Newport Beach Film Festival, the Best Director Award at the Cinetopia Film Festival, and a Special Jury Prize at the Los Angeles Asian Pacific Film Festival. That same year, Tyrus was named the Best Feature Documentary at both the Philadelphia Asian American Film Festival and the DisOrient Film Festival.
  In 2017, the film won the Best Feature Length Documentary - Legendary Film Pioneer Award at the Garden State Film Festival and was named the Best Documentary Feature at the Prescott Film Festival. On September 8, 2017, Tyrus had its national broadcast on PBS’s American Masters series. The series was nominated for a Primetime Emmy in 2018.
- Wong was featured in Mark Wexler's 2009 documentary How to Live Forever, where he discussed his daily lifestyle and his view on mortality.
- Wong starred as himself in Erik Friedl's 1989 short film Flights of Fancy, which centered around his kites.
- In 2010, Wong was interviewed for Hans Fjellestad's When the World Breaks, a film about creativity and survival during the Great Depression.

== Major works ==
=== Paintings ===
- Deer on Cliff, 1960s
- The Cove, 1960s
- Imaginary Landscape #1 and #2, 1955

=== Ceramics ===
- Winfield Pottery – Tyrus Wong Iris plate.
- Winfield Pottery – Tyrus Wong California Pink HP flower.

=== Filmography ===
- Bambi (1942) – Animation Department. Animation backgrounds.
- Around the World in Eighty Days (1956) – 1. Art Department. Assistant Art Director. 2. Miscellaneous Crew. Technical advisor.
- How to Live Forever (2009) – Documentary about secrets of long life. Himself.
- When the World Breaks (2010) – Documentary. Himself.
- Angel Island Profiles: Tyrus Wong (2011) – Documentary about himself at age 100.
- Tyrus (2015) – Documentary about the life and work of Tyrus Wong, directed by Pamela Tom.

Production Illustrator and Sketch Artist at Warner Brothers Studios:

- Sands of Iwo Jima (1949)
- April in Paris (1952)
- Calamity Jane (1953)
- Rebel Without A Cause (1955)
- Auntie Mame (1959)
- Harper (1963)
- PT 109 (1963)
- The Wild Bunch (1969)

=== Printmaking ===
Lithographs drawn and published at Lynton R. Kistler's Lithography Studio.

== Awards ==
=== 1938 ===
- Wong received the Merit Award from the Foundation of Western Art.

=== 1941 ===
- Wong was awarded the Purchase Prize from the L.A. Times.

=== 1943 ===
- Wong received the Service Award for his work on behalf of Art for National Defense.

=== 1954 ===
- Wong won the L.A. Museum Award for Watercolor.

=== 2000 ===
- Wong received the first United Asian Artists Network Award from the Pacific Asia Museum.

=== 2001 ===
- In September 2001, Wong received the Chinese American Museum's 5th annual Historymaker's Award.
- Wong was inducted as a Disney Legend.

=== 2006 ===
- On 6 February 2006, Wong received the Winsor McCay Award at the 33rd Annual Annie Awards.

=== 2007 ===
- In October 2007, Wong received the Lifetime Achievement Award from the National Watercolor Association.

=== 2009 ===
- Wong received the Hope of Los Angeles Award, presented by Mayor Villaraigosa and the City of Los Angeles.

=== 2010 ===
- On 8 May 2010, Wong received the Otis Alumni Achievement Award at the Beverly Hilton.

=== 2012 ===
- On 21 September 2012, Wong received the Artistic Achievement Award at the 21st OCS Annual Image Awards.

=== 2012 ===
- In November 2012, Wong received the Lifetime Achievement Award from the Museum of Chinese in America.

=== 2015 ===
- On 7 November 2015, Wong received the Lifetime Achievement Award at the San Diego Asian Film Festival.

=== 2016 ===
- On 9 March 2016, Wong received the Lifetime Achievement Award from the Angel Island Immigration Station Foundation.
- On 9 October 2016, Wong received the Lifetime Achievement Award at the Asian World Film Festival.

=== 2017 ===
- Wong received the Lifetime Achievement Award at the 22nd Annual Excellence in Production Design Awards, and was inducted into the Art Director's Guild Hall of Fame.

== See also ==
- List of centenarians (artists)
