= Maudelle Bass Weston =

American concert dancer and model

- Portrait of Maudelle Bass Weston by Johan Hagemeyer, 1940
- Born: Maudelle Bass; 1908; Early County, Georgia, United States
- Died: June 11, 1989 (aged 81); Plainfield, New Jersey, United States
- Education: Gray Conservatory of Music
- Known for: Dance; Performance art Modeling; Photography

Maudelle Bass Weston (1908 – June 11, 1989), known professionally as just Maudelle, was an American concert dancer, model and prominent cultural figure in the Los Angeles arts community during the 20th century.

== Early life and family ==
Bass Weston was born in Early County, Georgia, the daughter of an African-American mother from Georgia and father from South Carolina. Her father was of West Indian descent, her dance style was influenced by her Caribbean background. She was the youngest of 10 children born to Brutus Bass and Elizabeth "Lizzie" (née Holmes), both farmers.

== Career ==
During the 1920s, the teenager toured Mexico, where she was spotted by the artist Diego Rivera, who was reportedly enraptured by her beauty. Rivera sought an introduction through the American Consulate, and he secured her services as a model for his portraits.

Bass spent three years touring Central and South America with the Folklórico group. Her dance repertoire was influenced by dances from Africa, Egypt, Cuba, Brazil and America. In Mexico City, she was a critical darling of the press after her performance at the famed Palacio de Bellas Artes. The magazine Hoy wrote, "Maudelle is the high priestess of the dances. She possesses a kind of spiritual mysticism," while Últimas Noticias wrote, "She tells the story of the dance with rapture and passion."

Bass Weston moved to Los Angeles around 1933, where she continued her training at John Gray's Conservatory of Music in Los Angeles, and was trained in ballet by Isobel Keith Morrison. She was the first African American to study with modern choreographer Lester Horton. In L.A., she established herself as a well-known studio model for art schools and for artists such as Rivera, Johan Hagemeyer, and Edward Weston.

She continued to tour for many years and was nationally known for her performances. The renowned dancer La Meri, an expert in ethnic dance, said, "Maudelle is an artist of rare and moving sincerity. Her expression is an inspiration for all artists."

Bass Weston was also the subject of African-American sculptor Beulah Woodard's work Maudelle.

== Death ==
Bass Weston died, age 81, at the Muhlenberg Regional Medical Center in Plainfield, New Jersey.

== See also ==
- List of dancers
- List of people from Georgia (U.S. state)
- List of people from Los Angeles
