= The Hawaiians (film) =

1970 film by Tom Gries

- Theatrical release poster
- Directed by: Tom Gries
- Screenplay by: James R. Webb
- Based on: Hawaii; 1959 novel by James A. Michener
- Produced by: Walter Mirisch
- Starring: Charlton Heston; Tina Chen; Geraldine Chaplin; Mako
- Cinematography: Lucien Ballard; Philip H. Lathrop
- Edited by: Ralph E. Winters; Byron W. Brandt
- Music by: Henry Mancini
- Production company: The Mirisch Production Company
- Distributed by: United Artists
- Release date: June 17, 1970
- Running time: 134 minutes
- Country: United States
- Language: English
- Box office: $2.3 million (US/ Canada rentals)

The Hawaiians, released in the UK as Master of the Islands, is a 1970 American historical epic film based on the 1959 novel Hawaii by James A. Michener. Starring Charlton Heston at the head of an ensemble cast, the film was directed by Tom Gries from a screenplay by James R. Webb. Tina Chen received a Golden Globe best supporting actress nomination.

The film was based on the book's later chapters, which covered the arrival of Chinese and Japanese laborers and the growth of the plantations. The third chapter of the book had been made into the film Hawaii in 1966.

== Plot ==
Forty years after the events in the film Hawaii, sea captain Whip Hoxworth returns to Oahu with the Corinthian’s hold full of Chinese laborers. Determined to leave the helm and run the family shipping fleet from shore, he instead learns that his grandfather (Captain Rafer Hoxworth) has died and left his fortune to Hoxworth's cousin Malama and her stoic, reproachful husband, Micah Hale. Whip, considered the black sheep of his pious and conservative family, doesn’t even get the ship, just a barren Hanakai estate.

En route from China, the attractive young Hakka woman Bong Nyuk Tsin had been discovered among the all male Chinese immigrants. To foil a rape and claim her as his own, the cagey Mun Ki had lied she was his wife. The man who had kidnapped her from her village for a hell in a Honolulu brothel is killed in tribal fighting during the voyage. At the dock, Mun Ki and the brothel owner argue over the woman. Whip's wife, Purity, intervenes and suggests the Hoxworths hire the pair as domestics as a way of defusing the conflict. They’re provided a spartan wood shack on the estate to live in.

Some time later Mun Ki takes the pregnant Bong Nyuk Tsin to a local Chinese wiseman, who forecasts her bearing five sons. However, according to Chinese custom, Mun Ki's real wife in China will be considered the official mother of all. Bong Nyuk Tsin will be renamed “Aunt of Wu Chow,” Aunt of Five Continents (familiarly called "Wu Chow's Auntie"). When Mun Ki returns to China, he will take his sons with him. Bong Nyuk Tsin will be welcome to go back to her village alone.

A boy is born, and soon after Purity delivers a son, Noel. She has no milk, so Whip asks Wu Chow's Auntie to nurse the child. He notices her garden and learns she plans to save money to buy land through selling the produce. She declares she will never return to China.

After two years of failure, a well-driller Whip took a gamble on finally penetrates caprock and releases an aquifer. In spite of this boon Whip's relatives refuse to finance his raising sugar cane, insisting it will still fail under his feckless stewardship.

The one-quarter Hawaiian Purity becomes obsessed with her native ancestry, and rebuffs Whip's affections. The doctor raises the prospect of post-natal depression, but ventures her seeming mental decline stemming instead from generations of inbreeding among her royal Hawaiian ancestors.

Whip produces a seed pineapple that had been smuggled out of French Guiana, and gives the nearly-dead husk to Wu Chow's Auntie to care for. It flourishes. Ecstatic, Whip helps her get her garden, then returns to French Guiana to steal more seed.

While Whip is away, Mun Ki begins to display the symptoms of leprosy. Whip returns to find that he is about to be banished to the leper colony on Molokai. Wu Chow's Auntie will not abandon him, and leaves her sons behind.

Determined to raise his own son, Whip fetches Noel from Purity, who is living among Hawaiian natives and seemingly unhinged. Whip then goes to Molokai to retrieve Mun Ki and Wu Chow's Auntie's infant daughter, Mei Lei.

More years pass. Teen-aged Noel goes to sea. Japanese arrive to work in the pineapple fields. Whip meets a beautiful, well-educated Japanese beauty named Fumiko, who becomes his mistress. Pineapples thrive and he becomes wealthy, but remains a social pariah.

Mun Ki dies. With Whip's help, Wu Chow's Auntie is reunited with her sons, now educated young adults beginning to make their own ways in life.

More years pass. Noel returns from the sea, fluent in Chinese. He meets and immediately falls in love with a beautiful, captivating Mei Lei, and she him. Whip and Wu Chow's Auntie stand fast against their marrying, for different reasons.

Plague comes to Honolulu. Fires set to burn out vermin rage out of control. Amid the ashes, Whip and Wu Chow's Auntie agree that it will be to their mutual advantage after all to allow their children to wed. Whip will buy up distressed but highly valuable real estate on the cheap, and loan Wu Chow's Auntie the money to rebuild her family’s homes and properties.

Whip is a chief fomenter in the plot to overthrow the Hawaiian monarchy. He is arrested and sentenced to be beheaded by Queen Liliuokalani. For the first time ever, his contrary brother-in-law, her prime minister, stands by his side. With U.S. gunboats lying in the harbor, Hawaii is successfully annexed.

At Mun Ki's grave, Wu Chow's Auntie sits serenely telling him all about their family.

== Cast ==
- Charlton Heston as Whip Hoxworth
- Tina Chen as Bong Nyuk Tsin
- Geraldine Chaplin as Purity Hoxworth
- John Phillip Law as Noel Hoxworth
- Alec McCowen as Micah Hale
- Mako as Mun Ki
- Don Knight Milton as Overpeck
- Miko Mayama as Fumiko
- Virginia Lee as Mei Li
- Tanya Chang as Mei Li at 8
- Naomi Stevens as Queen Liliuokalani
- Harry Townes as American minister
- Khigh Dhiegh as Kai Chung
- Keye Luke as Foo Sen
- James Gregory as Dr. Whipple, Sr.
- Lyle Bettger as Janders
- Mary Munday as Malama
- George Paulsin as Noel at 15
- Jules Martin as Noel at 8
- Winston Char as Europe at 17
- Ed Pang as Africa at 18
- Randy Kim as Asia at 19
- Victor Young as America at 16
- Bill Fong as Australia at 14
- Chris Robinson as Young Dr. Whipple
- Mark Lebuse as Kilauea captain
- Mathew Fitzgerald as Symes
- Bruce Wilson as Morris
- Mailie Mccauley as Iliki
- Alan Naluai as Kimo
- Forrest Wood as Hewlett
- Murray Staff as A. Whipple
- Harry Holcombe as Fredericks
- Daniel Kaleikini Jr. as Lieutenant Keholo
- Galen Kam as Jim Wu
- Herman Wedemeyer as Fire chief
- Victor Sen Yung as Chun Fat
- Soo Young as Mrs. Ching
- James Hong as Ti Chong
- Elizabeth Smith as Apikela

== Reception ==
The film opened to mixed reviews, with many critics feeling it was not as successful an adaptation as the earlier Hawaii (1966), which was liked by both moviegoers and critics. It earned less money than the original film.

Writing for The New York Times, Roger Greenspun called it a "movie with reasonable claims to having something for almost everybody", with "spectacle" that proceeds with "efficient and attractive modesty"; he complimented the director's craftsmanship and highlighted the performances of John Phillip Law and Charlton Heston, but said "Geraldine Chaplin offers only a disturbing evocation of her father's face, without the other qualities of his presence." He calls Tina Chen "not remarkable", even though she has a "role almost equal to Heston's".

Time magazine was even less complimentary, saying "the plot is laced with the usual colonial tensions and pretensions: Hoxworth feuds with a polyglut of races while his pineapple princess (Geraldine Chaplin) goes quietly mad. Every time the pace slackens, which is often, someone goes to sea, either to pick up field hands or to transport lepers to Molokai. The incessant ebb and flow is intended as a metaphor for the turbulent tides of Hawaiian life. But the real metaphor here is the pineapple, which in the good old gangster days was a synonym for bomb."

Tina Chen received a Golden Globe nomination for Best Supporting Actress. Bill Thomas was nominated for an Academy Award for Best Costume Design.

== Home media ==
The Hawaiians was released on a home video format (DVD) on January 28, 2011 as part of the MGM Limited Edition Collection series.

A soundtrack album was released on United Artists (1970) with music composed and arranged by Henry Mancini, and using many traditional Chinese instruments.

== See also ==
- List of American films of 1970
