= Two Lies =

- Directed by: Pamela Tom
- Written by: Pamela Tom
- Produced by: Pamela Tom
- Starring: Dian Kobayashi; Sala Iwamatsu; Marie Nakano
- Cinematography: Gary Tieche
- Edited by: Pamela Tom
- Music by: James Leary
- Distributed by: Women Make Movies
- Release date: March 28, 1990
- Running time: 25 minutes
- Country: United States
- Language: English

Two Lies is a 1990 short film directed, produced and written by Pamela Tom and starring Dian Kobayashi, Sala Iwamatsu, and Marie Nakano. The film was shot in black and white and discusses issues like identity, Orientalism, and Blepharoplasty.

== Plot ==
The plot of the film focuses on the life of a Chinese American family who struggles with identity. The mother, Doris Chu, has undergone blepharoplasty, or "double eyelid" surgery, and the oldest of two daughters, Mei, has trouble understanding her mother's actions. From her perspective, her mother's two new eyes are equivalent to two lies. On a trip to Cabot's Pueblo Museum off a dusty highway in Southern California, a series of confrontations occur and Mei finally realizes her mother's reasoning. Between the conflicts of Chinese tradition and American ways, the family tries to adapt to their new life in Southern California.

== Cast ==
- Dian Kobayashi - Doris Chu (mother)
- Sala Iwamatsu - Mei Chu (oldest daughter)
- Marie Nakano - Esther Chu (youngest daughter)

== Extended Cast ==
- Joe Marinalli - Nick
- William Merzenich - Pueblo Tour Guide
- Bob McCarthy - Martin
- Melba Yale - Accordion Teacher
- Walter Looell, Jr - Teenage Boy at Pool
- Carolyn Stanek - Little Girl in Pool

== Awards, Festivals, & Screenings ==
- New Directors/New Films Festival
- Hawaii International Film Festival
- USA Film Festival
- NY Asian American Int'l Film Festival
- Sundance Film Festival
- The Smithsonian Institution
