= Face (2002 film) =

- Directed by: Bertha Bay-Sa Pan
- Written by: Bertha Bay-Sa Pan; Oren Moverman
- Produced by: Jonathan Shoemaker; Derrick Tseng
- Starring: Bai Ling; Kristy Wu; Kieu Chinh; Treach; Will Yun Lee; Ken Leung; Tina Chen
- Cinematography: John Inwood
- Edited by: Gary Levy
- Music by: Leonard Nelson Hubbard
- Distributed by: Indican Pictures
- Release dates: January 2002 (Sundance); March 18, 2005 (United States)
- Running time: 89 minutes
- Country: United States
- Language: English

Face is a 2002 drama film directed by Bertha Bay Sa Pan and co-written by Pan and Oren Moverman. It stars Bai Ling, Kristy Wu, Kieu Chinh, Treach, Ken Leung, Will Yun Lee, and Tina Chen. The film follows the multigenerational arc of three Chinese-American women.

Face premiered at the 2002 Sundance Film Festival where it was a nominee for the Grand Jury Prize for Dramatic Feature.

== Plot ==
Kim is a timid and conflicted 20-year-old in the 1970s, struggling to sort out her relationship with her traditional Chinese-American mother while forging a future for herself at college. Attempting to tread the fine line between dutiful daughter and independent woman, Kim has an unfortunate one-night stand with Daniel, the spoiled and arrogant son of a wealthy family. When Kim discovers that she is pregnant, she is forced to marry Daniel. Trapped in a nightmare marriage with a newborn infant, Kim leaves her daughter Genie in the care of her mother and departs for Hong Kong.

19 years later, Genie is a bright and independent young woman on the cusp of adulthood in the 1990s, who walks in two separate worlds; that of her grandmother's traditional community in Queens and the contrasting and vibrant downtown hip hop scene in New York City. When she falls in love with Michael, an African American DJ at a local club, and her mother Kim resurfaces from Hong Kong with plans to move back to New York, the three women are forced to resolve their betrayals and family history in order to survive.

== Cast ==
- Bai Ling as Kim
- Kristy Wu as Genie
- Kieu Chinh as Mrs. Liu
- Treach as Michael
- Will Yun Lee as Daniel
- Ken Leung as Willie
- Tina Chen as Mrs. Chang
- Melissa Martinez as Sue
- Deedee Magno Hall as Kelly
- Les J.N. Mau as Mr. Huang
- Diane Cheng as Mrs. Mar
- Kristy Qin as Jenny
- Ruth Zhang as Mrs. Huang
- Jim Chu as Steve
- Ben Wang as Mr. Leung
- Susan Bigelow as Hospital Nurse
- Paul J.Q. Lee as Husband #2
- Tina Factor as Asian Woman

== Production ==
Face began as an acclaimed short film by Bertha Bay-Sa Pan when she was a student at Columbia University’s Graduate Film School. The short went on to play at dozens of film festivals all over the world and was honored with the Polo Ralph Lauren Award for Best Screenplay at Columbia. The film also brought Pan the Director’s Guild Award for Best Asian American Student Filmmaker in 1997.

== Release ==
The film had its world premiere at the Sundance Film Festival in January 2002 in the Dramatic Competition. It received a limited theatrical release in the United States on March 18, 2005.

== Reception ==
Michael Wilmington, critic for the Chicago Tribune, praised the direction and performances writing Face "is realistic and highly entertaining...perceptively written [and] imaginatively directed". He added, "Pan's three actresses give astonishingly varied, spontaneous, powerfully human, award-worthy portrayals. As a filmmaker, Pan succeeds on almost every level: generating atmosphere, weaving an engrossing tale and eliciting marvelous performances."

Anita Gates selected the film as a New York Times Critics Choice Pick. Dana Stevens, critic for The New York Times, wrote the film "is likely to remain in your head long afterward...the director's attention to details of character and locale makes for a precise evocation of a New York seldom seen in feature films." David Edelstein, also for The Times, said the film "takes a conventional culture-clash theme and gives it the kick (and hop) of a good music mix tape."

Owen Gleiberman of Entertainment Weekly wrote, "If these mild tales of domestic scandal, which make up the movie Face, sound familiar and even a bit cliché, they are just that, yet it’s a testament to the bare-bones decency displayed by director Bertha Bay-Sa Pan that we’re compelled by them anyway."

G. Allen Johnson of San Francisco Chronicle wrote, "Co-writer and first-time director Bertha Bay Sa-Pan smartly alternates between the 1970s and present day, allowing us to observe the pressures each young woman had to endure, and why each one makes the decisions they do. The cast is very good, filled with bright young talent, and John Inwood's cinematography, which helps differentiate the eras depicted, is top-notch". TimeOut wrote, "The culture clash between immigrant parents and their American-born children is familiar territory, but New Jersey–born, Taiwan-raised director and co-writer Bay-Sa Pan gives the material her own spin and elicits strong performances from her appealing cast."

On review aggregate website Rotten Tomatoes, Face has an approval rating of 63% based on 24 reviews, with an average rating of 6.40/10. The site's critics consensus reads, "Face takes a well-meaning look at the immigrant experience whose affecting performances are often enough to outweigh its frustrating pacing and storytelling issues."

== Accolades ==
=== Awards and nominations ===
Award	Category	Recipient(s)	Result	Ref.
Urbanworld Film Festival	Best Director, Grand Jury Prize	Bertha Bay-Sa Pan	Won	
Festival Internazionale Cinema delle Donne	Special International Women Film Festival Prize	Bertha Bay-Sa Pan	Won	
Gen Art Film Festival	Best Feature, Audience Award	Bertha Bay-Sa Pan	Won	
CineVegas International Film Festival	Grand Prix Directing Prize, Critics Award - Special Mention	Bertha Bay-Sa Pan	Won	
Gotham Awards	Bingham Ray Breakthrough Director Award	Bertha Bay-Sa Pan	Nominated	
Sundance Film Festival	Grand Jury Prize, Dramatic	Bertha Bay-Sa Pan	Nominated	

== Music ==
=== Score ===
The film was scored by Leonard Nelson Hubbard (aka Hub) of the Grammy Award winning hip-hop band the Roots; featuring live recordings by the internationally renowned Peking Opera Orchestra, and CHOPS of Mountain Brothers.

=== Soundtrack ===
Face: Original Motion Picture Soundtrack

Soundtrack album by Various artists
- Genres: Hip hop, East Coast hip hop
- Label: Hi-Rise Records
- Producer: Various

The soundtrack includes theme song "Face" written and performed by Naughty by Nature, original song "Just Can’t Hold On" by Tre Hardson (SlimKid3 of the hip hop pioneering group Pharcyde). Kim Hill's (formerly of the Black Eyed Peas) song "Open Wide" also features on the soundtrack.

==== Track listing ====
Face (Music From The Original Motion Picture)
No.	Title	Artist	Length
1.	"Small Town Girl"	David Tao
2.	"I Hope U Do"	Stephen Simmonds
3.	"Mr. Weatherman"	Adriana Evans
4.	"Just Can't Hold On"	SlimKid3
5.	"Whyl-a-Banenee"	Otherized F.A.M
6.	"Commonwealth (Cheap Chicks)"	Bahamadia
7.	"Open Wide"	Kim Hill
8.	"The Light"	Pharaoh Monche
9.	"Bring It On Back"	Othello
10.	"Climb"	Mos Def
11.	"Monday Eve (English And Chinese Versions)"	Bay Sa
12.	"Waiting"	Bay Sa
13.	"Boulevard Star"	Delinquent Habits
14.	"Take My Breathe Away"	Lonnie Hillyer
15.	"Face"	Naughty By Nature
