= The Push Stars =

American rock band

- Origin: Cambridge, Massachusetts, U.S.
- Genre: Rock
- Years active: 1996
- Website: Official Site

The Push Stars are an American rock band formed in Cambridge, Massachusetts in 1996. The band members include Chris Trapper, Ryan MacMillan and Dan McLoughlin. They developed a following playing shows in Boston, then released their first album, Meet Me at the Fair in 1996. Since then, they have released four more studio albums, as well as a live compilation album, and have had several of their songs featured in television, film, and soundtracks, most noteworthily the 1998 film There's Something About Mary, on whose soundtrack appears the song "Everything Shines". The group was named EMI's "Best Unsigned Band in America" in 1997 after a fan surreptitiously entered them into the competition.

The group went on an extended hiatus after their 2004 release Paint the Town. While on hiatus, frontman Chris Trapper recorded and toured as a solo artist and Ryan MacMillan played drums with Matchbox Twenty. In 2017, the Push Stars played some reunion shows and announced the recording of a new album which was fully funded via Kickstarter. In July, 2017, recording of the new album commenced at Ardent Studios in Memphis, TN. On September 21, 2018, the band released their latest recording, 3 Feet in the Air.

== Discography ==
- Meet Me at the Fair (1996, Imago)
- Tonight (EP, 1998)
- After The Party (1999, Capitol)
- Opening Time (2001, Co-Op Pop)
- Paint the Town (2004, 33rd Street Records)
- 3 Feet In The Air (2018, Starlit Records)

== Film ==
- Origin of the Species (1998)
- There’s Something About Mary (1998)
- Gun Shy (2000)
- Me, Myself & Irene (2000)
- Dinner and a Movie (2000), includes "Well Anyway" and "Me"
- Say It Isn't So (2001)
- Almost Perfect (2011)
