= Beulah Woodard =

American sculptor (1895–1955)

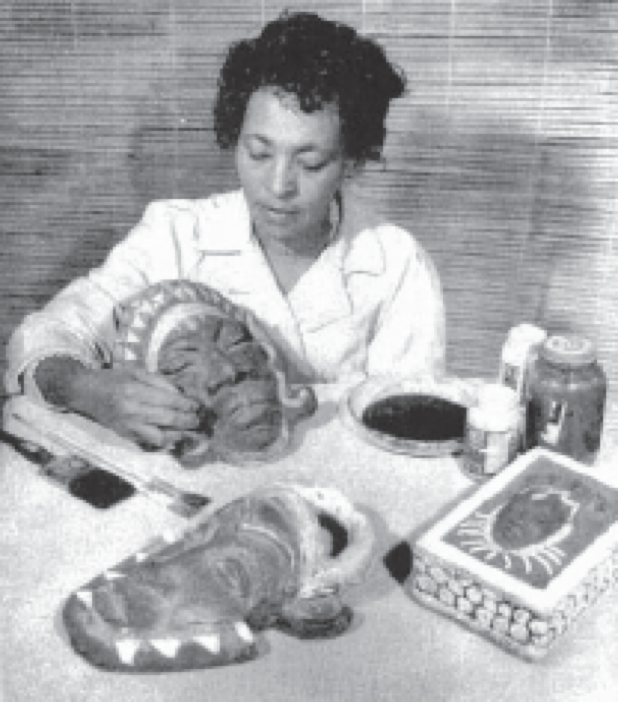
- Woodard with clay masks (1950)
- Born: Beulah Ecton; November 11, 1895; Frankfort, Ohio, United States
- Died: July 13, 1955 (aged 59); Los Angeles, California, U.S.
- Education: Polytechnic High School; Otis Art Institute; Los Angeles Art School; University of Southern California
- Known for: Sculpture
- Works: Maudelle; African Woman; Bad Boy; Mother and Child; Fulah Kunda
- Movement: Harlem Renaissance

Beulah Ecton Woodard (November 11, 1895 – July 13, 1955) was an American sculptor and painter based in California. Woodard was the first African American artist to have a solo exhibition at the Los Angeles County Museum of Art.

== Biography ==
Beulah Ecton was born near Frankfort, Ohio, on November 11, 1895. She was the daughter of Mr. and Mrs. William P. Ecton. Her father was a freedman, Civil War veteran, and farmer. While she was an infant, her family moved to California, where she lived near Los Angeles in what would become Vernon.

Several of Woodard's relatives were artists; one of her grandmothers was an expert weaver and dyer, while a male relation (either her grandfather or uncle) was a sculptor. She developed a lifelong fascination with African culture at the age of 12 when her family was visited by an African national. She attended Los Angeles Polytechnic High School, where she studied architectural drawing. After completing high school, Woodard worked various jobs as a maid and waitress. She started experimenting with clay during this period, but her family dissuaded her from the pursuit in 1926. In 1928, she married Brady Woodard.

Following her marriage, Woodard converted part of her home into an art studio and took courses at the Otis Art Institute, the Los Angeles Art School, and the University of Southern California. Her teachers included Glen Lukens, Paul Troubetzkoy, and Los Angeles County Museum of Art co-founder Peter David Edstrom.

== Artistic career ==
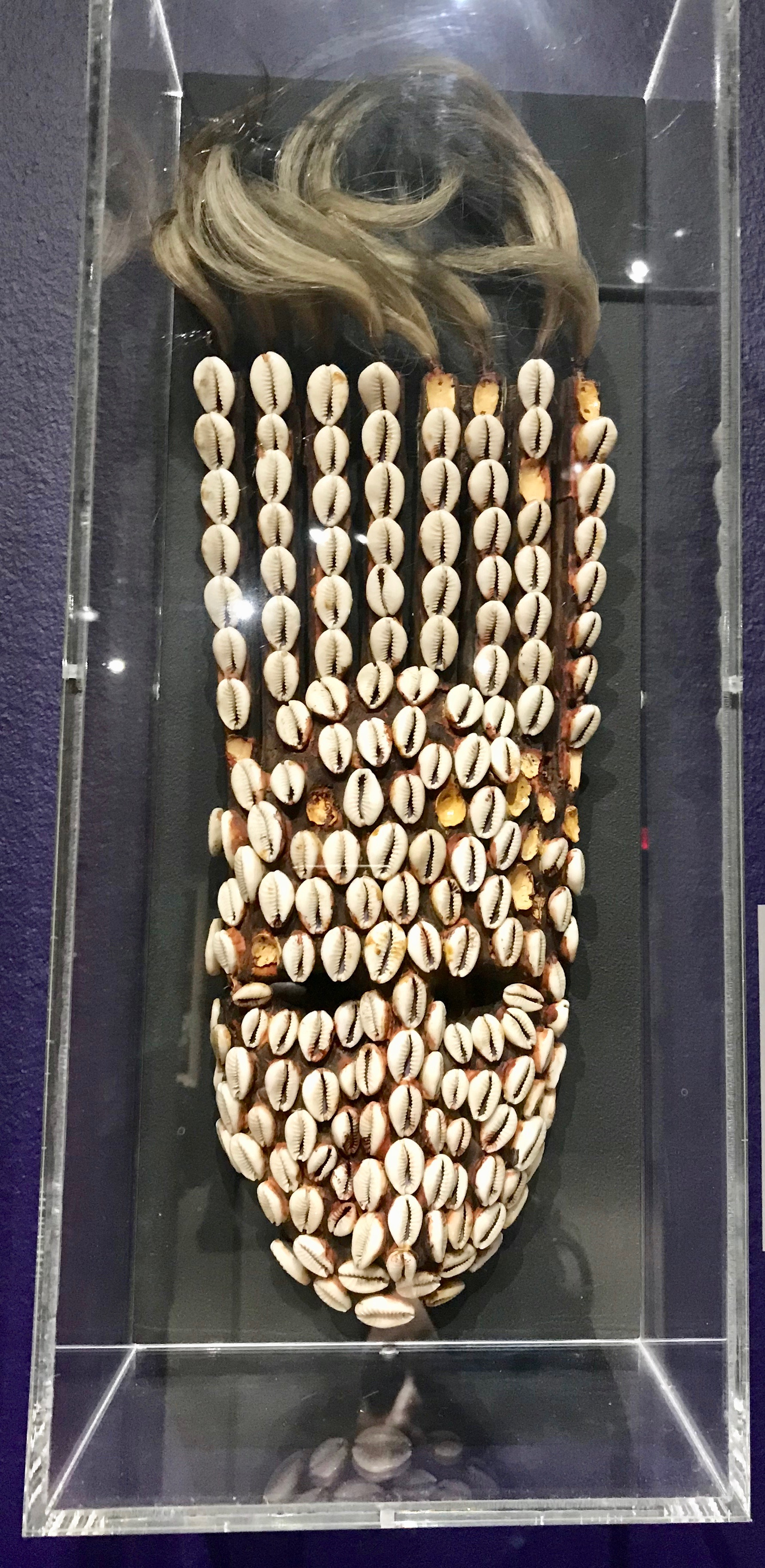
Cowrie Shell Mask by Beulah Woodard.

Woodard had her first show in February 1935 in the storefront window for the California News weekly. Discovering this exhibition, head librarian Miriam Matthews arranged for Woodard's work to be exhibited at the Vernon Branch Library and the Los Angeles Central Library. In 1937, Woodard exhibited her work at Stendahl Art Galleries. Woodard next became the first African American artist to exhibit a one-person show at the Los Angeles County Museum of Art with her 1937 exhibition of her African masks. The exhibition stayed up for two months and consisted of "a series of clay and papier-mâché masks, which were decorated with elaborate beading and feathers and based upon the artist's anthropological research." Many of her pieces were purchased by Golden State Mutual Life Insurance Company for its corporate art collection.

Woodard used various media to produce sculptures, including bronze, wood, terracotta, and papier-mâché. In her sculptures, she replicated the braided hairstyles, jewelry and headdresses of Ekoi, Luba, Hemba and Mangbetu peoples. Her terracotta work Maudelle is a realistic portrait of African-American concert dancer Maudelle Bass Weston, made without the use of sculptural models or drawings. Her best-known works include Bad Boy, Sharecropper, and Maudelle, all dated 1936–1938. She won first prize in sculpture at the Los Angeles All-City Annual Outdoor Arts Festival in 1953. Like other New Negro Movement artists, she sought to “promote a better understanding of Africa with its rich historical background” and foster pride in Black heritage.

Woodard was active in the Los Angeles artists' community and lectured at various educational institutions. She was a member of Our Authors Study Circle, a women's book club affiliated with the Association for the Study of African American Life and History, which persuaded mayor Fletcher Bowron to enact Los Angeles' first Negro History Week. In 1937, she co-founded the Los Angeles Negro Art Association. In 1950, she co-founded and directed the Eleven Associated Artist Gallery for the purpose of cultivating talented young Black artists. This short-lived Los Angeles artists co-op featured African American contemporaries Alice Taylor Gafford and William Pajaud and Chinese American artist Tyrus Wong.

Woodard died in Los Angeles on July 13, 1955, at the age of 59, before she could embark on a touring exhibition of museums in Germany.

== Gallery ==
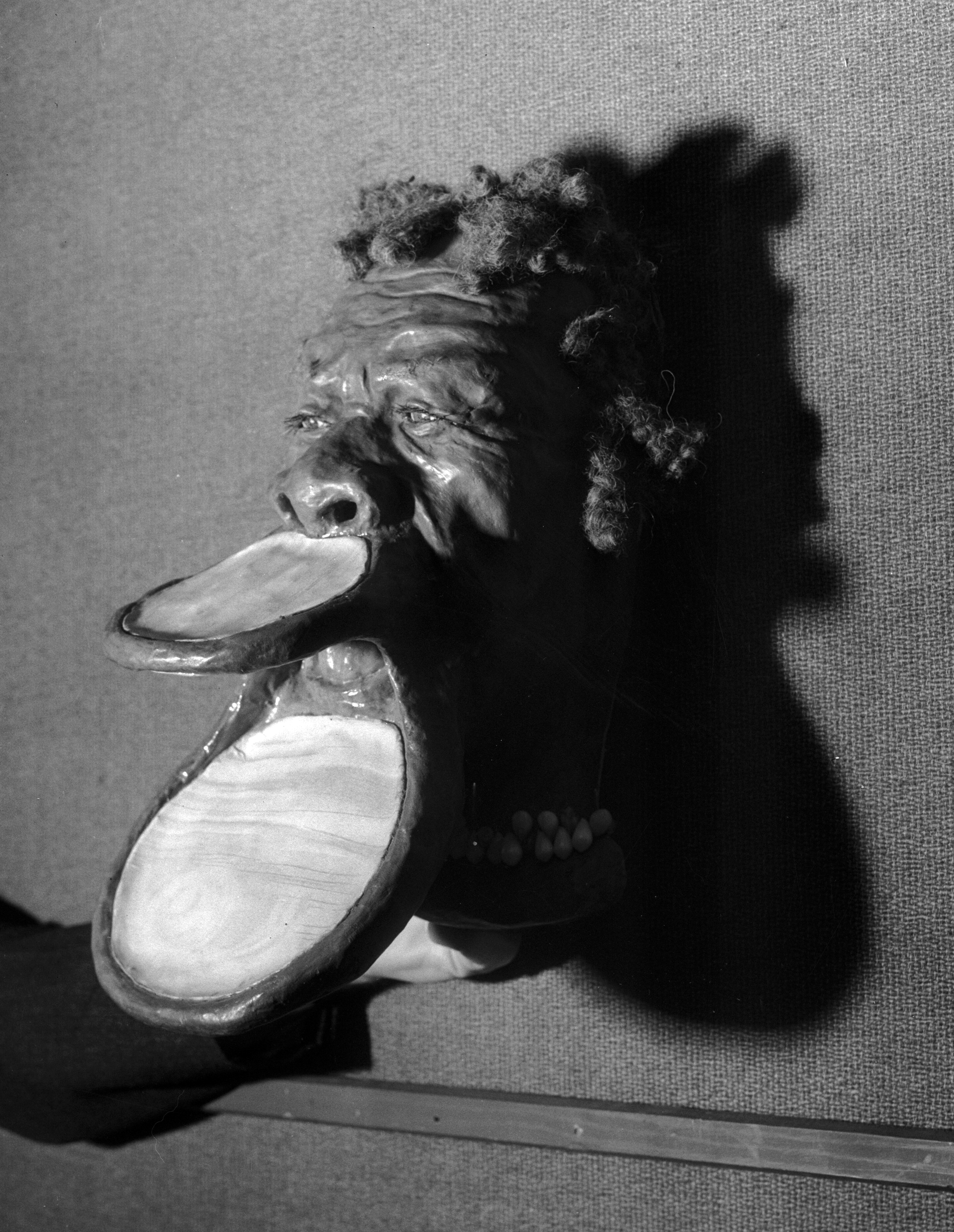
Mask of an unidentified subject

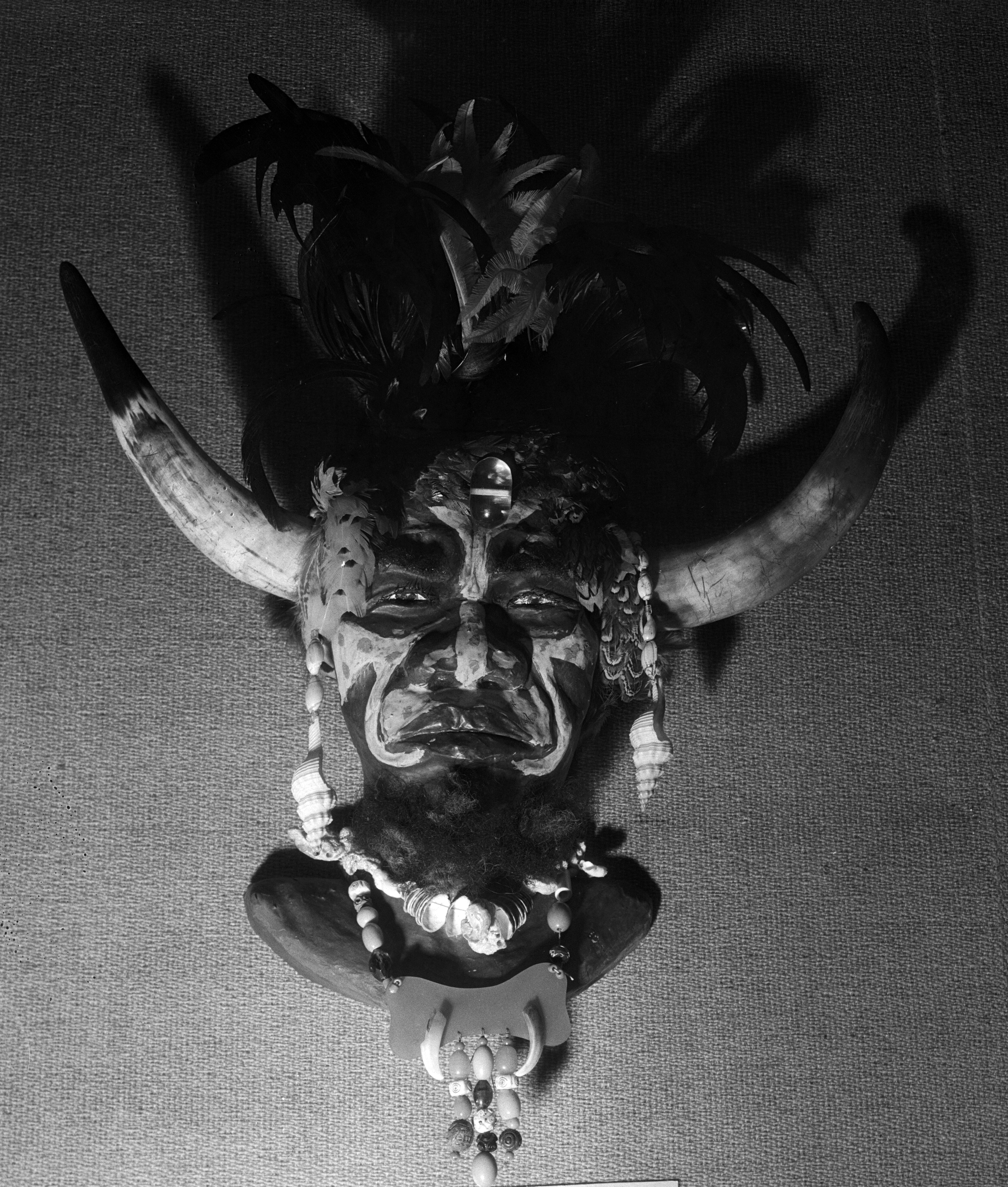
Mask of an African medicine man

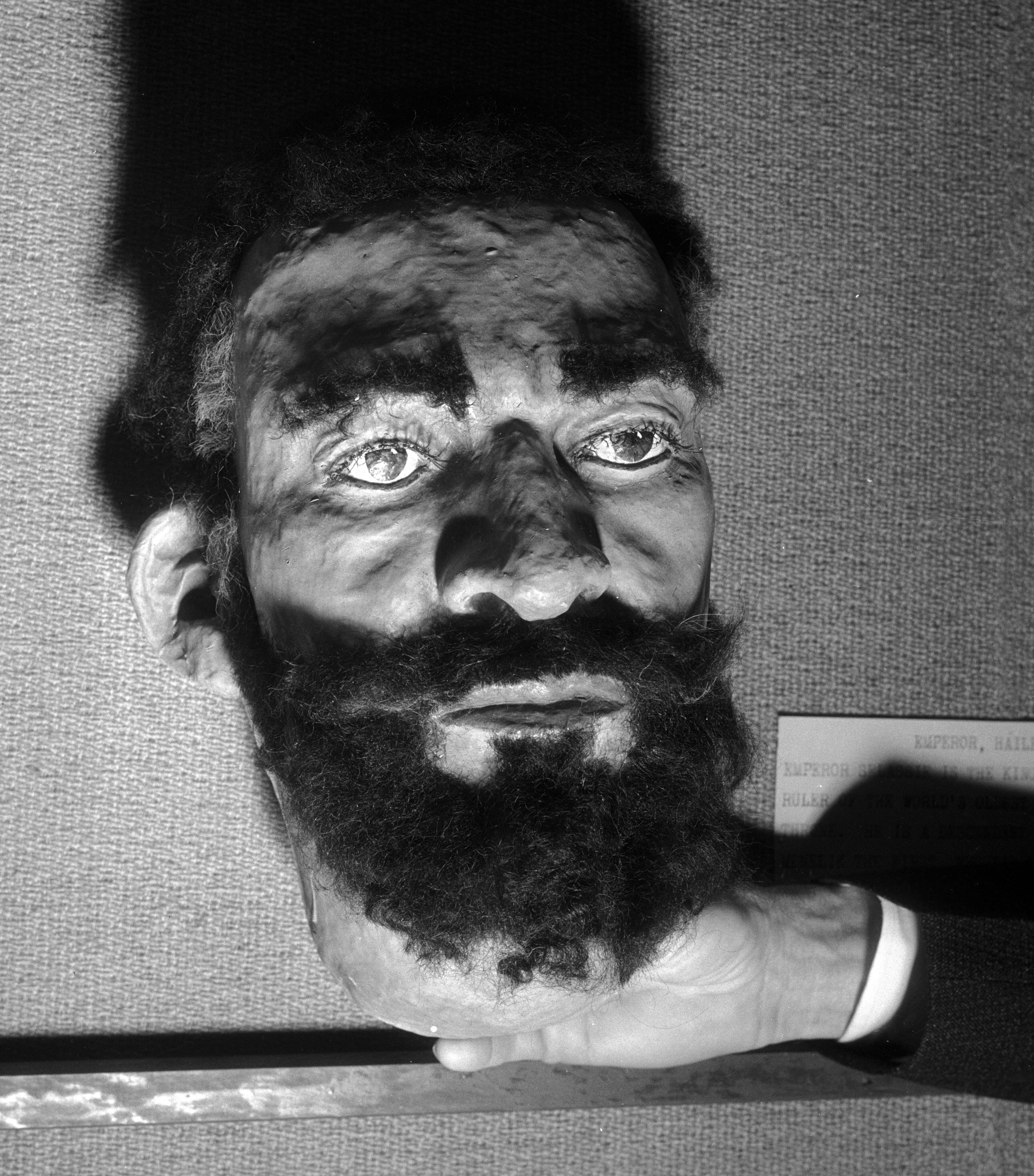
Mask of Haile Selassie

== See also ==
- List of African-American visual artists
- List of 20th-century women artists
