= William Pajaud =

William Etienne "Bill" Pajaud
- Born: August 3, 1925; New Orleans, Louisiana U.S.
- Died: June 16, 2015 (aged 89); Los Angeles, California, U.S.
- Occupations: Painter, artist
- Known for: Paintings exploring themes of Jazz

William Etienne "Bill" Pajaud (August 3, 1925 – June 16, 2015) was an African-American artist, primarily working in watercolor, known for his paintings exploring themes of jazz. He was born in New Orleans, Louisiana, and died in Los Angeles, California, on June 16, 2015, at the age of 89. He was the curator of the Golden State Mutual Life Insurance Fine Art Collection.

== Early life and education ==
William Pajaud's father was a jazz musician, whose main source of income was working at funerals. His mother was a trained pharmacist, but, as an African American woman, found it difficult to find work.

Pajaud earned a fine arts degree from Xavier University of Louisiana in New Orleans in 1941. Pajaud moved to Chicago in the early 1940s, where he took work as a sign painter and designer.

In 1949 he moved to Los Angeles to study graphic design at Chouinard Art Institute.

== Career and work ==
Pajaud was a member of the Society of Graphic Designers, the Los Angeles County Art Association, and the National Watercolor Society, of which he served as president from 1974 to 1975. He was part of the artists' collective Eleven Associated (later Art West Association). This Los Angeles artists' co-op included artists Beulah Woodard, Alice Taylor Gafford and Tyrus Wong.

Pajaud's watercolors featured imagery inspired by his childhood in New Orleans and his adult life in Chicago and Los Angeles: full-figured African American women, jazz funerals, street scenes.

== Exhibitions and collections ==
- 'Now Dig This!: Art and Black Los Angeles 1960–1980', Hammer Museum, Los Angeles, 2011.
- 'The Life and Art of William Pajaud', M. Hanks Gallery, Santa Monica, 2003.
- 'William Pajaud: The Sights and Sounds of My New Orleans', California African American Museum, Los Angeles, 2000.
- 'Psalms, Sermons & Rituals: William Pajaud', Brockman Gallery, Los Angeles, 1981.
- 'California Black Artists', Studio Museum in Harlem, New York, 1977.
- 'Suzanne Jackson/William Pajaud/Charles White', Haggin Art Galleries, Pioneer Museum, University of the Pacific, Stockton, California, 1975.
- 'Black American Artists '71', Illinois Art Council and Illinois Bell Lobby Gallery, Chicago, 1971.

Pajaud's work is in the collections of the Pushkin Museum, the Amistad Research Center, the Las Vegas Art Museum, the California African American Museum, the Hunter Museum and the National Museum of American Art.

== Golden State Mutual Life Insurance Fine Art Collection ==
Pajaud was the adviser for the acquisition of artworks for the black-owned Golden State Mutual Life Insurance Company, for whom he had worked since 1957 in design and public relations. In 1965, with a modest budget, he began to acquire the artworks of fellow African-American artists including Jacob Lawrence, Charles White, Betye Saar, Elizabeth Catlett, Richmond Barthé, Hale Woodruff, Charles Alston, Varnette P. Honeywood, David Hammons, Romare Bearden, John Biggers, Samella Lewis, Henry Ossawa Tanner and Willie Middlebrook. The collection also included several of Pajaud's own works. At more than 200 works, it became the largest U.S. collection of corporate-owned African American art. Pajaud stated that the collection was the thing of which he was proudest in his career.

A large proportion of the collection was auctioned in 2007 when the Golden State Mutual Life Insurance Company went out of business. 124 of the works from the collection were acquired by Los Angeles County after Pajaud put out a plea to 'Take care of the work and take care of the concept of the people. If, for instance, you are able to get your hands on a piece of that work, any of it, realize that all of it was put together in love, for you and anybody else in the world to see.' Several of these works are on view at the AC Bilbrew Library, the Willowbrook Senior Center, the View Park Bebe Moore Campbell Library, and the Kenneth Hahn Hall of Administration.

== Awards ==
Pajaud's honors include:

- 1969 PRSA Art Exhibition Award of Merit
- 1971 National Association of Media Women Communications Award
- 1975 University of the Pacific Honor
- 1978 Paul Robeson Special Award for Contribution to the Arts
- 1981 PR News Gold Key Award
- 1981 League of Allied Arts Corporation Artists of Achievement Award
- 2004 Samella Award.
