= Almost Perfect (film) =

- Directed by: Bertha Bay-Sa Pan
- Written by: Bertha Bay-Sa Pan
- Produced by: Derrick Tseng; Riva Marker; Bertha Bay-Sa Pan
- Starring: Kelly Hu; Ivan Shaw; Edison Chen; Roger Rees; Christina Chang; Tina Chen
- Cinematography: Sam Chase
- Edited by: Sheri Bylander
- Music by: Jeff Martin
- Distributed by: Eleven Arts
- Release date: March 13, 2011 (San Francisco International Asian American Film Festival)
- Running time: 106 mins.
- Country: United States
- Language: English

Almost Perfect is a 2011 American drama film written and directed by Bertha Bay-Sa Pan starring Kelly Hu, Ivan Shaw, Edison Chen, Roger Rees, Christina Chang, and Tina Chen. Pan received an HBO Emerging Filmmaker Award at the 2011 Philadelphia Asian American Film Festival for the film.

== Premise ==
A 30-something career woman named Vanessa Lee (Kelly Hu) tries to find the balance between her demanding family (Tina Chen and Roger Rees) and her perfect new boyfriend (Ivan Shaw).

== Cast ==
- Kelly Hu as Vanessa Lee
- Ivan Shaw as Dwayne Sung
- Christina Chang as Charlene Lee
- Roger Rees as Kai Lee
- Edison Chen as Andy Lee
- Tina Chen as Sandra Lee
- Natalie Gold as Karen
- Lisa Werlinder as Susan
- Kristy Wu as Natalia
- Alice Callahan as Sales Lady
- Allison Mackie as Lori
- Chris Meyer as Frank
- Zach Page as Bobby
- Ruth Zhang as Auntie Helen
- Diane Cheng as Auntie Rosa
- Steven Hauck as Professor Williams
- Norma Chu as Grandma Tan
- Jim Chu as Tom

== Reception and release ==
The film screened at numerous film festivals including The San Francisco International Asian American Film Festival, The Los Angeles Asian Pacific Film Festival (as Centerpiece Film), Hawaii International Film Festival (as American Immigrant Filmmaker in Profile), Friars Club Comedy Film Festival, and the San Diego Asian Film Festival (as Opening Night Film), Vancouver Asian Film Festival (as Opening Night Film), Boston Asian American Film Festival (as Opening Night Film), Pune International Film Festival, Gwangju International Film Festival, amongst others.

Pan also received the Philadelphia Asian American Film Festival's HBO EMERGING FILMMAKER AWARD. The film had a limited U.S. theatrical release in 2012, garnering positive reviews from Variety, The San Francisco Examiner, The Honolulu Pulse, and more.

== Awards ==
- HBO Emerging Filmmaker Award, 2011 Philadelphia Asian American Film Festival
