= Alice Taylor Gafford =

American painter (1886–1981)

- Born: August 15, 1886; Tecumseh, Kansas, United States
- Died: October 27, 1981 (aged 95)
- Occupations: Nurse; Artist

Alice Taylor Gafford (August 15, 1886 – October 27, 1981) was an American nurse, teacher, and artist, based in Los Angeles.

== Early life and education ==
Alice Taylor was born in Tecumseh, Kansas, one of ten children. Her parents were Benjamin and Alice Armstead Taylor.

== Career ==
Gafford was a nurse for twenty-five years before beginning her career in art. Notable from her first career is a stint with the American Red Cross in Alaska (1915–16), and her work with Daniel Hale Williams in Chicago.

She moved to Los Angeles in 1922. She trained at Otis Art Institute (now called Otis College of Art and Design) and earned a teaching certificate at UCLA in 1951, when she was sixty-five years old, and taught art in an adult education program.

She was active in the Val Verde community, teaching and holding art exhibitions, and chairing the Val Verde Women's Cultural Society. Her works, mostly still life or landscape scenes, were exhibited often in her later years. At 81, she accepted a commission to paint portraits of twelve notable African Americans, for display at the Family Savings and Loan Association offices in Los Angeles.

Gafford was involved in founding the Los Angeles Negro Art Association in 1937, and the Eleven Associated Artists gallery (later Art West Association) in downtown Los Angeles. The short lived Los Angeles artists co-op included African American contemporaries Beulah Woodard, William Pajaud and Chinese American artist Tyrus Wong.

She was called "the dean of black artists in Los Angeles" in recognition of her community leadership. Her oil paintings were part of a Negro History Week exhibit at Doheny Library in 1953.

== Personal life ==
Alice Taylor married Louis Sherman Gafford, a World War I veteran, in 1928. She was widowed in 1959, and stopped painting in 1975, after developing cataracts. Alice Taylor Gafford died in 1981, age 95, and her remains were buried at Los Angeles National Cemetery.

== Legacy ==
Gafford was known for her role in founding and developing a number of art groups in southern California, including the annual Val Verde art show, which was later named in her honor. She is remembered as an early African-American woman artist in Los Angeles, and as an artist who became especially productive at an advanced age. She is represented by paintings in the collections at Howard University, the Long Beach Museum of Art, and the Bowers Museum, among other institutions.
