= The Book of Daniel (TV series) =

2006 American drama TV series

- Genre: Drama
- Created by: Jack Kenny
- Starring: Aidan Quinn; Susanna Thompson; Christian Campbell; Alison Pill; Ivan Shaw; Ellen Burstyn; James Rebhorn
- Composers: W.G. Snuffy Walden; Bennett Salvay
- Country of origin: United States
- Original language: English
- No. of seasons: 1
- No. of episodes: 8 (3 unaired)

Production
- Executive producers: Jack Kenny; Flody Suarez; John Tinker
- Producers: Aidan Quinn; Dan E. Fesman; Harry Victor; Tracey Stern; Michael Stricks
- Running time: 60 minutes
- Production companies: The Flody Co.; Bumpy Night Productions; NBC Universal Television Studio; Sony Pictures Television

Original release
- Network: NBC
- Release: January 6 – January 20, 2006

The Book of Daniel is an American drama television series that was broadcast on NBC. The network promoted it as a serious drama about Christians and the Christian faith, but it was controversial with some Christians. The show had been proposed for NBC's 2005 fall line-up, but was rescheduled as a 2006 mid-season replacement. The program premiered on January 6, 2006, in the US and was scheduled to air in thirteen episodes on Friday nights. The series ended on January 20, 2006. NBC called the show "edgy", "challenging", and "courageous" in its promotional material. On January 24, 2006, a spokeswoman for NBC announced the show had been dropped.

== Synopsis ==
Set in the fictional town of Newbury in Westchester County, New York, the main character is the Reverend Daniel Webster (Aidan Quinn), an unconventional Episcopal priest who is addicted to narcotic painkillers while his wife Judith (Susanna Thompson) fights her dependence on mid-day martinis.

Struggling to be a good husband, father, and priest, Webster regularly sees and talks with a traditional Western-world, white-skinned, white-robed and bearded Jesus (Garret Dillahunt) who nonetheless is rather unconventional. Daniel's Jesus appears only to him and openly questions modern interpretations of Church teachings, reminding Daniel of his own strengths and weaknesses.

The Webster family includes 23-year-old gay son Peter (Christian Campbell), 16-year-old daughter Grace (Alison Pill) (arrested for drug possession in the pilot episode), and 16-year-old adopted Chinese son Adam (Ivan Shaw), who is dating Caroline Paxton (Leven Rambin), the daughter of one of Daniel's parishioners who harbors anti-Asian prejudices. Another son, Peter's twin brother Jimmy, died of leukemia two years prior to the beginning of the series; Christian Campbell also played the role of Jimmy in flashback scenes in an unaired episode (which was included in the DVD release).

When Daniel's brother-in-law Charlie absconds with church funds and abandons his family, Daniel's sister-in-law (Cheryl White) enters a lesbian relationship with Charlie's bisexual secretary. Bishop Beatrice Congreve (Ellen Burstyn) is involved with Daniel's married father (James Rebhorn), a retired bishop who, despite his gruff exterior, is troubled by dealing with his wife's Alzheimer's disease.

== Cast ==
- Aidan Quinn as Daniel Webster
- Susanna Thompson as Judith Webster
- Ivan Shaw as Adam Webster
- Garret Dillahunt as Jesus
- Alison Pill as Grace Webster
- Christian Campbell as Peter Webster
- Ellen Burstyn as Beatrice Congreve
- James Rebhorn as Bertram Webster
- Dylan Baker as Roger Northrup

== Episodes ==
No.	Title	Directed by	Written by	Original release date	US viewers (millions)
1	"Temptation"	James Frawley	Jack Kenny	January 6, 2006	9.02
2	"Forgiveness"	James Frawley	Jack Kenny	January 6, 2006	9.02
3	"Acceptance"	Perry Lang	Dan E. Fesman & Harry Victor	January 13, 2006	6.87
4	"Revelations"	John Fortenberry	John Tinker	January 20, 2006	5.81
5	"Assignation"	Mel Damski	Teleplay by : Dava Savel; Story by : Dan E. Fesman & Harry Victor	Unaired	N/A
6	"Withdrawal"	Adam Bernstein	Tracey Stern	January 20, 2006	5.81
7	"God's Will"	Michael Fields	David Simkins	Unaired	N/A
8	"Betrayal"	Jeremy Podeswa	Jack Kenny	Unaired	N/A

== Controversy ==
The New York Times reported NBC had difficulty selling advertising during the program, even after offering significant rate discounts, because of controversial content.

=== Stations refuse to air ===
Eight of NBC's 232 affiliates refused to carry the program due to viewer complaints: WSMV in Nashville, Tennessee (owned at the time by Meredith Corporation); WGBC in Meridian, Mississippi; WTVA in Tupelo, Mississippi, and six stations owned by Nexstar Broadcasting Group – WTWO in Terre Haute, Indiana; KARK-TV in Little Rock, Arkansas; KFTA-TV/KNWA-TV in Fayetteville-Fort Smith, Arkansas (the former is now affiliated with Fox); KAMR in Amarillo, Texas and KBTV-TV in Beaumont, Texas (owned at the time by Nexstar). Most of the affiliates refusing to air the program were located in the Bible Belt.

After KARK-TV refused to air the series, KWBF (now MyNetworkTV affiliate KARZ-TV), then an affiliate of The WB, picked up the series. The company stated that it was excited to offer an outlet for viewers in the central Arkansas area who wanted to watch the show. However, the station soon received a number of threats, which required it to hire extra security.

NBC's Salt Lake City affiliate, KSL-TV (whose owner, Bonneville International, is operated by the Church of Jesus Christ of Latter-day Saints), did carry The Book of Daniel, despite the station's history of preempting shows that offend the values of the LDS Church.

== Mid-season cancellation ==
On January 24, 2006, NBC announced the show had been dropped from the schedule. The last airing of the show was on January 20, 2006. The January 20 episode was the fourth in the series, drawing 5.8 million viewers. NBC gave no official explanation for the cancellation.

== DVD release ==
On September 26, 2006, a complete-series collection of The Book of Daniel was released on DVD exclusively on Amazon.com by Universal Studios Home Entertainment. The set includes two discs, featuring all eight episodes.
