= Kristy Wu =

American actress (born 1982)

- Born: October 11, 1982 (age 44); Los Angeles, California, U.S.
- Years active: 1999–2016

Kristy Wu (born October 11, 1982) is a retired American actress, best known for her recurring role as Chao-Ahn in the TV series Buffy the Vampire Slayer and co-starring as Melissa Wu in Flight 29 Down. Other television credits include guest appearances on Joan of Arcadia, Freaks and Geeks, and Moesha. Her movie appearances include What's Cooking?, Drive Me Crazy, and Cry Wolf. She also co-starred alongside Sara Paxton as one of the Sinister Sisters in the fourth installment in the Disney Channel film series, Halloweentown, Return to Halloweentown.

== Filmography ==
=== Film ===
Year	Title	Role
1999	Drive Me Crazy	Liz
2000	What's Cooking?	Jenny Nguyen
2002	Face	Genie
2005	Cry Wolf	Regina
2007	Lions for Lambs	Student
2010	Father vs. Son	Cydney
2011	Almost Perfect	Natalia
2012	End of Watch	Sook

=== Television ===
Year	Title	Role	Notes
1999	Freaks and Geeks	Mousy Girl	Episode: "Pilot"
1999	Moesha	Lisa	Episode: "Just Above My Head"
2003	Buffy the Vampire Slayer	Chao-Ahn	6 episodes
2004	Joan of Arcadia	Annie	Episode: "The Election"
2006	Return to Halloweentown	Scarlett	TV movie
2005–2007	Flight 29 Down	Melissa	30 episodes
2007	Flight 29 Down: The Hotel Tango	Melissa	TV movie
2007	The News	Darla	TV movie
2008	Mask of the Ninja	Miko	TV movie
2012	The Mentalist	Janpen	Episode: "My Bloody Valentine"
2012	Elementary	Jun Annunzio	Episode: "You Do It to Yourself"
2014	The Night Shift	Janet Zia	2 episodes
2014	The Legend of Korra	P'Li	6 episodes
2015–2016	Transformers: Robots in Disguise	Windblade / Pilot / Additional voices	11 episodes

=== Video games ===
Year	Title	Role	Notes
2005	Cold Winter	Kim	
2012	Dishonored	Billie Lurk	The Knife of Dunwall DLC
