= Chinese Historical Society of New England =

Historical society in Massachusetts, US

The Chinese Historical Society of New England (CHSNE) is a historical society located in Boston, Massachusetts, that was founded in 1992. It was founded with the directive to document Chinese American immigration in the New England region.

In 2016, the CHSNE partnered with the Tisch College Community Research Center (TCRC) of Jonathan M. Tisch College of Civic Life, Tufts University, and Mass Humanities to present a series of programs and exhibits called "These Words", designed to advocate for the return of a branch library in Boston's Chinatown. "These Words" included information about the original branch library in Chinatown, the Shanghai Printing company (showing the importance of the printed word), an Oxford Street Community Bulletin Board (considering how the community communicated), and current activism around the library's disappearance. The curators decided "to bring the evidence out into the public square by digitizing... archival documents and photographs and displaying them as large outward facing panels on windows in the neighborhood." At the same time, a public art project featuring cutouts of residents of Chinatown, conceived by artist Wen-ti Tsen and also sponsored by CHSNE, appeared on the Chinatown streets: "Tsen said the project, called 'Home Town,' is meant to underscore how development continues to affect the community, which was founded in the late 1800s and has over 12,800 residents."
