= Pamela Tom =

Chinese-American film producer

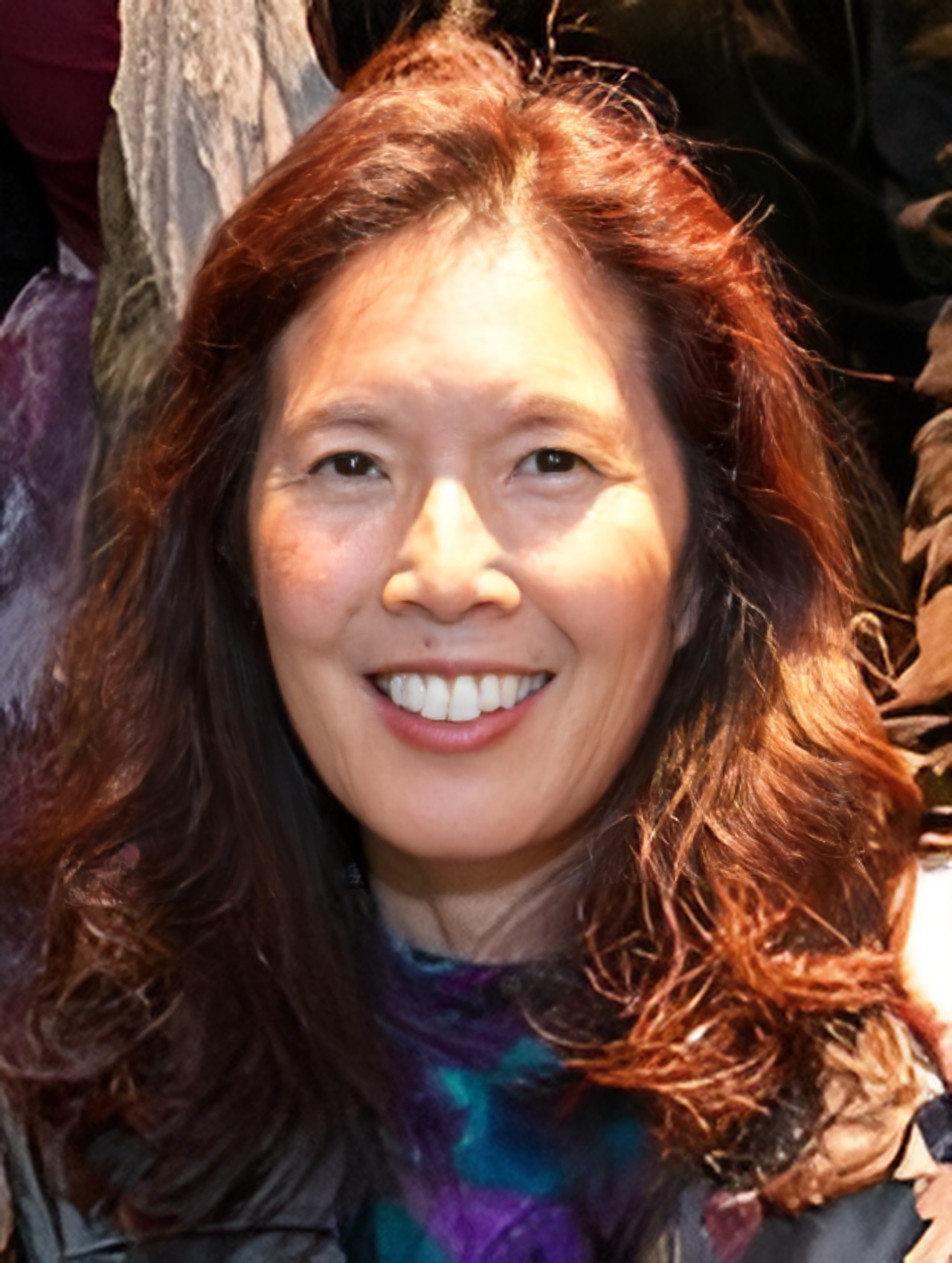
- Tom in 2014
- Born: Los Angeles, California, U.S.
- Other names: Pam Tom
- Occupations: Director, producer, screenwriter

Pamela Tom is a 5th generation Chinese American producer, director, and screenwriter. Her films often explore the Chinese experience in the Western world, social justice, feminism, and religion.

== Early life ==
Tom's family immigrated to the U.S. from southern China in the 1870s. Her grandfather owned the restaurant, New Moon, in Downtown L.A. Her father managed the restaurant and mother was a teacher.

Tom was born in Los Angeles and raised in Monterey Park.

== Education ==
In 1981, Tom earned a bachelor of art degree in Development Studies from Brown University.

From 1980 to 1981, Tom was a visiting student at the University of Ile-Ife in Ile-Ife, Nigeria.

In 1990, Tom earned a MFA from UCLA's Department of Theater, Film and Television. Her narrative thesis film, Two Lies, screened at the Sundance Film Festival, the New Directors/New Films Festival, and the Smithsonian Institution. The film went on to be distributed by Women Make Movies.

== Career ==
Tom began her career when she received a Disney Writing Fellowship. After leaving Disney, Tom became the Senior Associate Producer on the ABC Television Special The Story of Mothers & Daughters and the field producer on the PBS television pilot directed by Michael Camerini, "Becoming the Buddha in LA". She went on to direct Sidney Poitier in a monologue to promote the Showtime original film, Mandela and de Klerk.

Tom later became the Director of Diversity, overseeing the diversity talent program, Project: Involve, at Film Independent for nine years.

In 2008, Tom became a Producer and Development Executive for KCET in Los Angeles, where she developed and oversaw production on several national and international projects, including the national prime-time series WIRED Science and the BBC/KCET three-part series, "World War II Behind Closed Doors: Stalin, the Nazis and the West," on which she directed Keith David for the American narration and also supervised the sound editing and sound mixing.

Tom went on to executive produce Gwen Wynne's debut feature film, Wild About Harry, starring Tate Donovan and Adam Pascal. The film premiered at the Palm Springs International Film Festival.

In 2015, Tom wrote, produced, and directed the acclaimed documentary, Tyrus, about the pioneering Chinese American artist, Tyrus Wong, through her production company, New Moon Pictures. It premiered at the Telluride Film Festival and was broadcast on the Emmy-nominated season of PBS’s American Masters series. The film won nine festival awards and has screened world-wide.

In 2019, Tom received a Los Angeles Press Club nomination and an Emmy Award for writing, directing and producing the 2018 PBS documentary, Finding Home: A Foster Youth Story.

Tom has taught film directing at UC Santa Barbara, Loyola Marymount University, and UCLA Extension. She is a member of the Academy of Television Arts and Sciences and Film Fatales.

== Filmography ==
=== Film ===
Year	Film	Role
2018	Finding Home	Writer, director, producer
2015	Tyrus	Writer, director, producer
2009	American Primitive	Executive Producer
2009	The Story of Mothers & Daughters	Associate Producer
1990	Two Lies	Writer, director, producer

=== Television ===
Year	Film	Role
2008	World War Two: Behind Closed Doors	Post-Production Producer (1 Episode)
2007	Wired Science	Producer (1 Episode)
1993	Becoming the Buddha in L.A.	Field Producer

== Additional sources ==
Zahed, Ramin (November 18, 2012). "Tyrus Wong Documentary Launches on Kickstarter". Animation Magazine. Jean Thoren.

McArthur, Meher (January 8, 2013). "Chinese Brushstrokes in Hollywood: The Works of Tyrus Wong". KCET.
