= Christina Chang =

Taiwanese-American actress

- Born: Taipei, Taiwan
- Education: Taipei American School; University of Kansas (BA); University of Washington (MFA)
- Occupation: Actress
- Years active: 1998–present
- Spouse: Soam Lall (m. 2026)

Chinese name
- Traditional Chinese: 張韻明
- Simplified Chinese: 张韵明
Transcriptions
Standard Mandarin
- Hanyu Pinyin: Zhāng Yùnmíng

Christina Chang (Chinese: 張韻明; pinyin: Zhāng Yùnmíng) is a Taiwanese-American actress. She is known for her work on television, notably as Dr. Audrey Lim on The Good Doctor (2017–2024) and Yuna Hollander on Heated Rivalry (2025–present). She also portrayed Sunny Macer on the 3rd and 7th seasons of 24 (2003, 2007), State's Attorney Rebecca Nevins on CSI: Miami (2004–2010), Megan Vannoy on Nashville (2013–2014), and Kiki on Rizzoli & Isles (2012–2013).

== Early life ==
Chang was born and raised in Taipei, Taiwan, to a Chinese-Filipino father and an American mother. She attended Taipei American School and is fluent in Mandarin. At the age of 17, she moved to the United States to study theatre and film in her mother's home state of Kansas. Later, she moved to Seattle, Washington, where she studied acting.

== Career ==
After graduation, she got her first acting role in Naomi's Road at the Children's theatre in Seattle and then appeared in Halfway Home, an off-Broadway play by Tina Landau. She later moved to New York City and guest starred in various television programs including Cosby and As the World Turns. She earned feature film roles in such films as 28 Days and Random Hearts.

Chang is best known for her roles on television. She had a regular role on ABC series L.A. Dragnet (2003–2004), and played recurring roles on 24 as Dr. Sunny Macer, and as State Attorney Rebecca Nevins on CSI: Miami. In 2010, Chang was cast as a regular in ABC's series No Ordinary Family, but was killed off-camera in the second episode when the plot line was changed. She also appeared in Once and Again, Boston Legal, Close to Home, Brothers & Sisters, Private Practice, Suits, The Mentalist and Desperate Housewives. In 2013 she was cast in another recurring role, in the second season of the ABC drama series Nashville, as Megan Vannoy, love interest of Charles Esten's character. In 2014, Chang was cast in the ABC drama pilot Sea of Fire, opposite Jennifer Carpenter. She also had a recurring role as Kiki, Vince Korsak’s life coach, then love interest and wife, in Rizzoli & Isles in Season 6 & 7. From 2017-24, Chang played Dr. Audrey Lim on The Good Doctor.

Since 2025, Chang has played Yuna Hollander, the mother of Shane Hollander (Hudson Williams), on the Canadian streaming series Heated Rivalry.

== Filmography ==
=== Film ===
Year	Title	Role	Notes
1998	Brother Tied	Camille	
1999	Random Hearts	Laurie	
2000	28 Days	Bridesmaid	
2001	Dinner and a Movie	Rhonda	
2007	Live Free or Die Hard	Taylor	a.k.a. Die Hard 4
2008	A Line in the Sand	Robin	
2008	Yoga Matt	Christina	Short film
2009	The Peanut Butter Theory	Lucy	Short film
2011	Almost Perfect	Charlene Lee	
2012	Overnight	Lisa	
2022	Press Play	Mrs. Knott	

=== Television ===
Year	Title	Role	Notes
1997	Ghost Stories	Amy Vong	Episode: "From the Ashes"
2000	Cosby	Wendy	Episode: "Raising Paranoia"
2000–2001	Deadline	Beth Khambu	Recurring role
2001	Once and Again	Amanda	Recurring role
2002	Girls Club	Rhanda Clifford	Recurring role
2003	War Stories	Camera Woman	Made-for-TV-movie
2003	Without a Trace	Ms. Rossi	Episode: "Are You Now or Have You Ever Been"
2003–2009	24	Dr. Sunny Macer	Recurring role
2003–2004	L.A. Dragnet	ADA Sandy Chang	Recurring role
2004	Medical Investigation	Jenny Small	Episode: "Escape"
2004	Hack	Cate Tann	Episode: "Calibrated Arguments"
2004	The West Wing	Alex Moreau	Episode: "The Warfare of Genghis Khan"
2004	Hack	Cate Tann	Episode: "One for My Baby"
2004–2010	CSI: Miami	State Attorney Rebecca Nevins	Recurring role
2005	Boston Legal	Attorney Elizabeth Tyler	Episode: "Let Sales Ring"
2005	Breadwinners	Anne Lowell	Made-for-TV-movie
2005	Numb3rs	Val Eng	Episode: "Soft Target"
2005–2007	Close to Home	Becky Brokaw	Recurring role
2006	Women in Law	Liz	Episode: "High Bar"
2007	Union Jackass	Sonya Wang	Episode: "Pilot"
2007	Suspect	Justine Lambroso	Made-for-TV-Movie directed by Guy Ritchie.
2007	Standoff	Dr. Meredith Golden	Episode: "Backfire"
2007	Traveler	Alex	Episode: "The Trader"
2008	Play or Be Played	Diane Hobbs	Made-for-TV-movie
2008	Unhitched	Gabby	Episode: "Conjoined Twins Pitch No-Hitter"
2008	Eleventh Hour	Professor Anna Young	Episode: "Flesh"
2008	Man of Your Dreams	Malinda	Made-for-TV-movie
2009	The Forgotten	Claire Post	Episode: "Diamond Jane"
2009	Brothers & Sisters	Professor Jane Condon	Episode: "From France with Love"
2009	The Forgotten	Claire Post	Episode: "Parachute Jane"
2009	The Mentalist	Lillian Foster	Episode: "Red Scare"
2010	The Deep End	Jan	Episode: "White Lies, Black Ties"
2010	Private Practice	Dr. Vanessa Hoyt	Recurring role
2010	No Ordinary Family	Detective Yvonne Cho	2 episodes
2010	Lie to Me	Candice	Episode: "The Royal We"
2011–2012	Single Ladies	Ashlee	Recurring role
2011	Suits	Vivien Tanaka	Episode: "Dirty Little Secrets"
2011	Revenge	Karrie Thurgood	Episode: "Pilot"
2012	The Firm	Prosecutor Rebecca Crowell	Episode: "Chapter Four"
2012	Revenge	Karrie Thurgood	Episode: "Intuition"
2012	Desperate Housewives	D.A. Stone	Recurring role
2013–2014	Nashville	Megan Vannoy	Recurring role
2014	Sea of Fire	Kristen Harper	Made-for-TV-movie
2015	Childrens Hospital	Duenna	Episode: "Just Like Cyrano de Bergerac"
2015	Extant	Dr. Dowling	Episode: "Change Scenario"
2015	Rizzoli & Isles	Kiki	Recurring role
2016	NCIS	NCIS Special Agent Valeri Page	Episode: "React"
2016	Lucifer	Vanessa Dunlear	Episode: "St. Lucifer"
2017–2024	The Good Doctor	Dr. Audrey Lim	Recurring role (Season 1), Main cast (Seasons 2–7)
2023	Unstable	Jean	Recurring role
2025–present	Heated Rivalry	Yuna Hollander	Main cast
