= Tina Chen =

Chinese actress

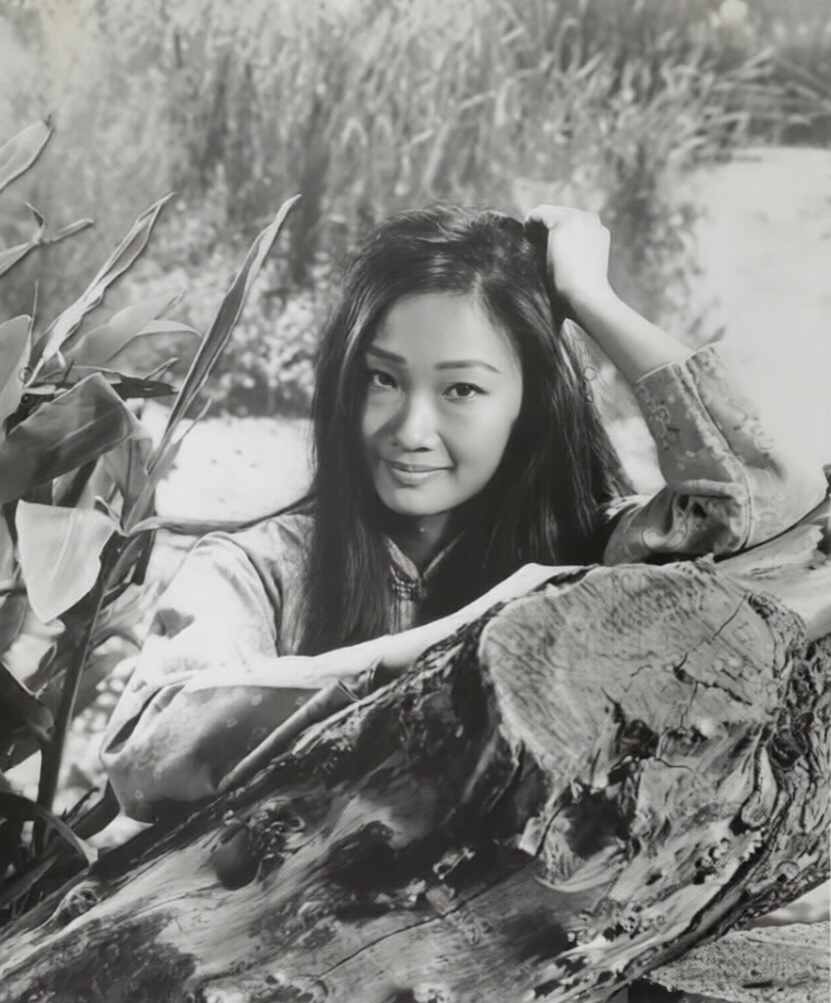
- Chen in the CBS Playhouse presentation of "The Final War of Olly Winter"(1967)
- Born: November 2, 1943 (age 82); Chongqing, China
- Occupations: Actress, Director, Producer
- Years active: 1967–present
- Known for: "The Final War of Olly Winter"; Alice's Restaurant; The Hawaiians
- Spouse: Marvin Josephson (m. 1973; died 2022)

Tina Chen (Chinese: 陳婷; pinyin: Chén Tíng; born November 2, 1943) is a Chinese-American stage, film, and television actress, director, and producer, who starred in the films Alice's Restaurant, Three Days of the Condor, and The Hawaiians. She has been nominated for Golden Globe, Emmy, and Drama Desk awards.

== Biography ==
Born in Chongqing, Chen lived briefly in mainland China, Hong Kong, Taiwan, Japan, and then went to the United States.

While pursuing her acting career, Chen worked for over a decade as a researcher in the serology and genetics department at the New York Blood Center.

She also co-founded Food Liberation, one of the first health food stores in New York City.

Her films include the independent feature Almost Perfect and the short film The Potential Wives of Norman Mao. She also starred in The Hawaiians, for which she received a Golden Globe award nomination; Alice's Restaurant, Three Days of the Condor, and Face.

Chen has guest-starred on numerous TV shows and was nominated for an Emmy for her performance in the CBS Playhouse special The Final War of Olly Winter.

Chen has directed plays at various theaters in New York, including Pan Asian Repertory Theatre's production of Fairy Bones, starring Lucy Liu in her stage debut. Chen co-produced the Broadway production of the Peter Nichols play, Passion Play, starring Frank Langella and was part of the producing team of the Broadway production of The Rink, by Terrence McNally, starring Chita Rivera and Liza Minnelli.

== Lecture ==
Chen's lecture, "Heroes of History: Legacy of My Chinese Family" features 158 biographical photos. It is about three generations of her mother's family and their contributions to the history of China. In the lecture, which has been presented at New York City's China Institute, Urban Stages, and the Mirror Repertory Co., she talks about her great-grandfather.

== Work ==
=== Film ===
- Descendants of the Past, Ancestors of the Future (2014)
- Almost Perfect (2011)
- The Potential Wives of Norman Mao (2011)
- Face (2002)
- The Ghost of Flight 401 (1978)
- Three Days of the Condor (1975)
- Paper Man (1971)
- The Hawaiians (1970)
- Alice's Restaurant (1969)

=== Made for Television Specials ===
- Lady from Yesterday (CBS, 1985)
- The Year of the Dragon (PBS, 1975)
- 13 Stars for Channel 13 (PBS)
- The Final War of Olly Winter (CBS Playhouse, 1967)

=== Episodic Television ===
- Mercy
- Central Park West
- The Devlin Connection
- Dan August
- The Streets of San Francisco
- Harry O
- The Man and the City
- Airwolf
- City Kids
- Kung Fu
- The Delphi Bureau
- The Tonight Show Starring Johnny Carson

=== Theatre ===
- The Love Suicide at Schofield Barracks
- The Shanghai Gesture
- Comfort Women
- Empress of China
- The Joy Luck Club
- The Innocence of Ghosts
- The Chang Fragments
- Arthur and Leila
- Madame de Sade
- Family Devotions (by David Henry Hwang)
- The Year of the Dragon (by Frank Chin)
- A Midsummer Night's Dream
- Tropical Tree
- In the Heart of America
- A Small Delegation
- Widescreen Version
- As the Crow Flies (by David Henry Hwang)
- A Streetcar Named Desire
- Santa Anita '42
- The Kitchen God's Wife
- A Song for All Saints
- Darkness Within

=== Directing ===
- Tea (by Velina Hasu Houston)
- The Shining Queen
- At Plank Bridge
- Kokoro/True Heart (by Velina Hasu Houston)
- Yin Chin Bow
- Fairy Bones (1992) — with Lucy Liu

=== Producing ===
- The Shining Queen
- Beyond Gravity
- Best Kept Secret
- The Rink (Drama Desk Nomination; by Terrence McNally; starring Chita Rivera and Liza Minnelli)
- Passion Play (by Peter Nichols; starring Frank Langella)

== Awards ==
Chen received a Golden Globe nomination for her supporting performance in the film The Hawaiians. She received an Emmy nomination for her supporting performance in the CBS Playhouse drama The Final War of Olly Winter. She also received a Drama Desk nomination for Outstanding Production of a Musical for, The Rink, starring Chita Rivera and Liza Minnelli.

Other awards include Urban Stages 25th Anniversary Award for Artistic Brilliance, Women's Project's Women of Achievement Award, Girl Scouts Woman of Distinction Award, the Anna May Wong Award of Excellence, and Pan Asian Repertory Theatre's Legacy Award.
