= Philadelphia Asian American Film Festival =

American film festival

- Location: Philadelphia
- Founded: 2008
- Language: English
- Website: http://www.phillyasianfilmfest.org

The Philadelphia Asian American Film Festival (PAAFF) is an annual film festival in Philadelphia that shows feature films and short films by and about Asian Americans. Run by the nonprofit Philadelphia Asian American Film and Filmmakers, the 10-day festival takes place in November, with additional screenings held year-round. Events and films expose audiences to the diverse Asian American experience.

The first annual festival took place on October 9–12, 2008, catalyzed by the growth of filmmaking and the many Asian Americans in the area.

The 2016 festival showed 70 films and hosted discussions with filmmakers, celebrity chef catering, live music and art and theater performances, and an academic conference. It drew more than 5,000 attendees, including 36 curators and filmmakers.

Many films are screened at International House of Philadelphia in University City and the Asian Arts Initiative in Chinatown North, with additional screenings at community organizations throughout Philadelphia.

== See also ==
- Philadelphia Film Festival
- CAAMFest
