= Jonathan Hamm =

American football player and boxer (born 1985)

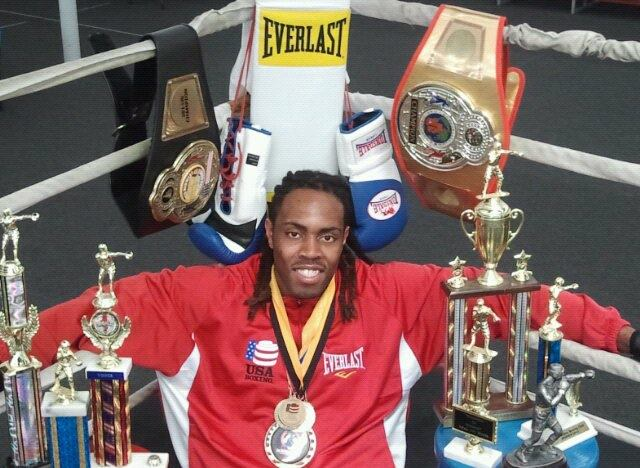

Personal information
- Nickname: Beauty Salon
- Nationality: American
- Born: Jonathan Hamm; October 14, 1985 (age 40) Atlanta, Georgia, U.S.
- Height: 6’0”
- Weight: 255 lb (116 kg)

Boxing career
- Stance: Orthodox

Boxing record
- Total fights: 9
- Wins: 7
- Losses: 2

Jonathan Hamm (born October 14, 1985) is an American former standout amateur boxer, actor, football player, and current mixed martial artist. Hamm was the #1 Super-Heavyweight Amateur boxer in the United States in 2011 after winning the 2011 U.S. Nationals. Hamm was an alternate in the super-heavyweight division of the 2012 London Olympic Games for the U.S. Hamm earned Black College All-American, 1st Team All Conference, 1st Team All-Region, and The Marion E. Jackson Defensive Player of the Year in 2006. Hamm is originally from Atlanta, Georgia, and trained out of Jackson's Submissions Fighting in Albuquerque, New Mexico. His manager was Malki Kawa, founder of First Round Management out of Miami, Florida, who houses UFC stars Jon Jones, Benson Henderson, Carlos Condit, Miesha Tate, and Frank Mir.

Hamm went to Southern Illinois University and received a degree in Music Business. He was mentored by Mar Brown, VP of the Urban Department of Atlantic Records, and music executive John Monopoly. He is the CEO of P4P ("There's a Purpose 4 This Process") Entertainment Records.

== Football ==
Hamm played football for Southern Illinois University and Clark Atlanta University before signing a professional contract with the New Orleans Saints in 2007. Following a hamstring injury, however, Hamm was cut by the Saints and subsequently played for two years for the New York Dragons of the Arena Football League. In 2009, Hamm was a member of the San Angelo Stampede Express of the Indoor Football League.

== Acting ==
Hamm had modeled and appeared in television commercials by 2007, and was discovered by Robert D. Siegel when Siegel was casting for the independent film Big Fan. That film was well received by critics, but Hamm didn't believe that he had a future in acting, and abandoned the profession.

== Boxing ==
Hamm was recruited to become a boxer in 2009 by All-American Heavyweights, an organization that develops athletes from other sports into boxers. Through All-American Heavyweights Hamm was matched with Johnny Johnson, the proprietor of the Rice Street Gym in St Paul. Johnson trained Hamm until a motorcycle accident curttailed Johnson's involvement, so Adonis Frazier of Circle of Discipline Boxing Gym in Minneapolis is filling in while Johnson recovers. In 2011 Hamm qualified for the US Olympic Trials by winning the 2011 USA Boxing championship. Hamm currently fights out of Carson, California at the Rock Boxing Gym. He is currently signed with All American Heavyweights Promotions as a professional.

- 2011 USA National Champion
- 2011 USA Olympic Trials #1 Seed
- 2011 National Golden Gloves 3rd Place
- 2011 Upper Midwest Golden Glove Champ
- 2011 Minnesota Golden Glove Champ
- 2011 USA Minnesota District Champ
- 2011 USA Upper Midwest Champ
- 2010 Coachella Dessert Showdown Champ
