= Marcia Jean Kurtz =

American actress

- Education: Juilliard School (BS)
- Occupations: Actress, director
- Years active: 1968–present

Marcia Jean Kurtz is an American film, stage, and television actress and director. She has appeared in such films as The Panic in Needle Park, In Her Shoes, and Big Fan, appearing as Miriam Douglas in Dog Day Afternoon and Inside Man. Kurtz won an Obie Award for her performance as Doris in Donald Margulies' The Loman Family Picnic. She was also nominated for both an Obie and a Drama Desk Award for her role in Martin Sherman's When She Danced. Kurtz also directed Matty Selman's Uncle Phillip's Coat and Evan Handler's Time of Fire.

She has appeared several times on the television series Law & Order.

Kurtz is a 1964 graduate of the Juilliard School, where she earned a B.S. degree in dance.

== Acting career ==
=== Films ===
Year	Title	Role	Notes
1971	The Panic in Needle Park	Marcie	
1971	Cry Uncle!	Russian Girl	
1971	Born to Win	Marlene	
1971	Believe in Me	Emergency Room Nurse	
1972	The Stoolie	Sheila Morrison	
1974	Death Wish	Receptionist	
1975	Dog Day Afternoon	Miriam Douglas	
1976	Pleasantville	Jo	
1977	Nomadic Lives	Gretchen	
1983	Cold Feet	Psychiatrist	
1984	Once Upon a Time in America	Max's Mother	
1988	Running on Empty	School clerk	
1997	Night Falls on Manhattan	Eileen	
1998	Meschugge	Rita Teichmann	
1998	One True Thing	Marcia	
2000	Center Stage	Emily's mother	
2000	Requiem for a Dream	Rae	
2000	The Day the Ponies Come Back	Thelma	
2002	The Book of Danny	Fritzi	
2004	From Other Worlds	Brian's Mom	
2005	In Her Shoes	Mrs. Stein	
2006	Find Me Guilty	Sara Stiles	
2006	Inside Man	Miriam Douglas	
2007	Arranged	Principal Jacoby	
2007	Before the Devil Knows You're Dead	Hospital Receptionist	
2008	The Marconi Bros.	Annette Marconi	
2008	The Wrestler	Admissions Desk Woman	
2008	Miracle at St. Anna	Post Office Customer	
2009	Big Fan	Theresa Aufiero	
2010	Black Swan	Costumer Georgina	
2011	Tower Heist	Rose	
2013	Ass Backwards	Barb	
2017	Mother!	Thief	
2018	If Beale Street Could Talk	Italian Grocer	
2023	Ex-Husbands	Eunice Pearce	

=== Television ===
Year	Title	Role	Notes
1968	N.Y.P.D.	Marcie	2 episodes
1973	Mr. Inside/Mr. Outside	Renee Isaacs	
1977	The Four of Us		unsold pilot
1984	Concealed Enemies	Esther Chambers	
1990	Law & Order	Mrs. Halsey/Carla Lowenstein	reprised C.L. role in 2004
1998	Sex and the City	Noanie Stein	1 episode
2000	100 Centre Street		
2008	Recount	Carol Roberts	
2014	Blue Bloods	Marion Davis	
2021	The Blacklist	Edna Brimley	

=== Stage ===
Year	Title	Role	Notes
1970	The Chinese and Dr. Fish	Pu Ping Chow	
1986	Execution of Justice	Barbara Taylor, Carol Ruth Silver, and Dr. Solomon	
1989	The Loman Family Picnic	Doris	Obie Award
1990	When She Danced	Miss Belzer	Obie Award Nomination, Drama Desk Award Nomination
2000	Taller Than a Dwarf	Mrs. Shaw	
2001	Everett Beekin	Ma	
2006	The People Next Door	Mrs. Mac	
