= Josh Trank =

American filmmaker (born 1984)

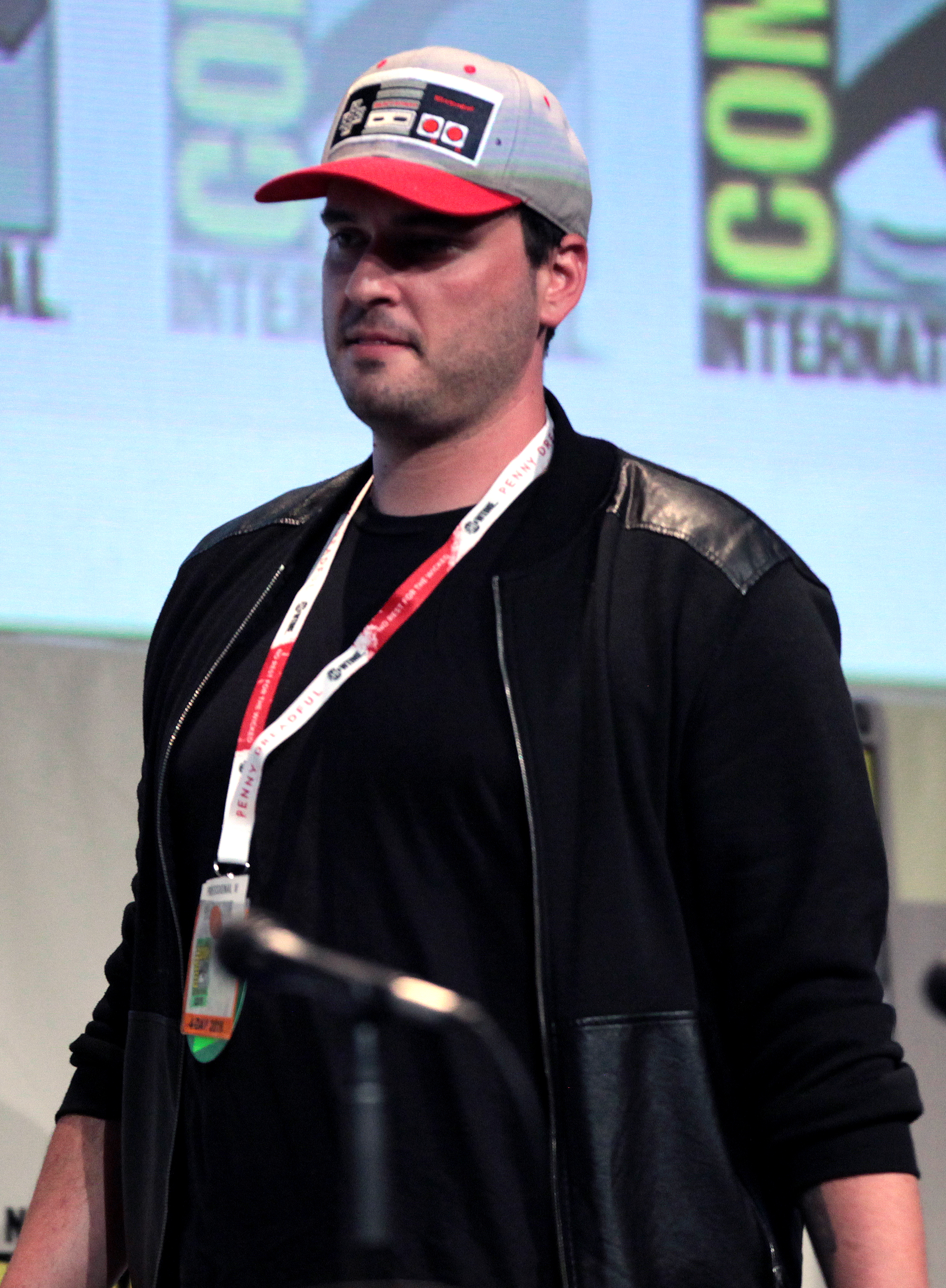
- Trank at the 2015 San Diego Comic-Con
- Born: Joshua Benjamin Trank; February 19, 1984 (age 42); Los Angeles, California, U.S.
- Occupations: Film director; screenwriter; film editor
- Years active: 2007–present
- Spouse: Krystin Ver Linden (m. 2013; div. 2017)
- Relatives: Judy Toll (stepmother)

Joshua Benjamin Trank (born February 19, 1984) is an American film director, screenwriter, and film editor. He is known for directing the found-footage sci-fi thriller film Chronicle (2012), the superhero film Fantastic Four (2015), and the Al Capone biographical film Capone (2020).

== Early life ==
Joshua Benjamin Trank was born February 19, 1984 in Los Angeles to school teacher Pamela Trank and documentary filmmaker Richard Trank. His father produced the Academy Award winning documentary The Long Way Home. Trank also has a younger sister and is Jewish. When Trank was 13, his parents divorced and later his father remarried to comedian Judy Toll, who later died from skin cancer. He was initially uncomfortable with her, but they ultimately bonded when Toll pushed him into entertainment when she invited him to perform with The Groundlings. "[The] experience, changed me...I think about her still, like, every day, and I miss her tremendously." In 2002, Trank graduated from Beverly Hills High School.

In 2020, he revealed that he had been sexually abused several times when he was between five and six years old, which later in life gave him problems like anger issues, before he began therapy.

== Career ==
During an interview with Kevin Smith on the podcast Fatman on Batman, Trank discussed the origins of his career at length. He attributed his YouTube video "Stabbing at Leia's 22nd Birthday", which became very popular overnight after its release, as a significant breakthrough point for his career. Following this, Trank wrote and directed spin-off webisodes for the 2007 Spike TV drama miniseries The Kill Point. In 2009, Trank edited the independent film Big Fan, starring Patton Oswalt. He was also credited as a co-producer and had a small acting role in the film.

In 2011, Trank directed his first feature film, Chronicle. It was released on February 3, 2012, by 20th Century Fox and grossed over $125 million worldwide. Chronicle, made for a budget of $12 million, was received positively by critics, earning an 85% score on Rotten Tomatoes. Up until May 2026 with Kane Parsons (20, Backrooms) and Curry Barker (26, Obsession), the release of Chronicle had Trank break the record for the youngest director to open a film at number one at the US box office, at age 27. He is followed by Steven Spielberg (28, with Jaws) and James Cameron (30, with The Terminator). After the release of Chronicle, Trank was linked to Sony's Spider-Man spin-off Venom, Warner Bros.'s The Red Star, and Sony's film adaptation of the video game Shadow of the Colossus; however, Trank turned down those film projects, despite turning in a pitch of a R-rated film of Venom in the vein of The Mask that he wrote with his mentor Robert D. Siegel.

Trank directed the 2015 reboot of Fantastic Four, which was released in August 2015. The film flopped at the box office and was critically panned; it received a 9% rating on Rotten Tomatoes and a 27 out of 100 rating from Metacritic. Trank became the subject of controversy when he posted and quickly deleted a message on Twitter prior to the release of the film, apparently blaming the poor reviews on changes imposed by the studio, claiming to have originally cut a completely different film which would have been much better. Equally dissatisfied with the final film, actor Toby Kebbell, who worked with Trank on the film, supported Trank's claim. However, in early 2020, Trank stated that there were several scenes he was unable to film, making a director's cut highly improbable.

In June 2014, it was announced that Trank would direct a stand-alone Star Wars film about Boba Fett, but he left the project less than a year later. Trank indicated this was a personal decision, but several outlets stated that he was dismissed from the project due to issues during production of Fantastic Four, primarily a lack of communication with the film's producers, and that Lucasfilm had decided to pursue another director. Trank told the Los Angeles Times in an interview that the reason he left the film was because he wanted to do something original and smaller-scale, due to the amount of online scrutiny he received during the filming of Fantastic Four.

In 2020, following a five-year hiatus from directing, Trank wrote and directed his original Al Capone biopic Capone, with Tom Hardy starring. It was released through video on demand on May 12, 2020, receiving mixed reviews from critics.

In May 2020, it was announced that Trank was developing a television series about the CIA, with Hardy starring.

In March 2025, it was announced that Trank will be directing a horror-thriller film, Send a Scare, with Victoria Justice, Robbie Amell, Noel Fisher, and Mackinlee Waddell set to star.

== Style ==
Trank has mentioned that he is interested in a deconstruction approach in his movies; "the deconstruction of myth, the deconstruction of iconic figures, the deconstruction of mythic ideas".

== Personal life ==
In early October 2013, Trank married screenwriter Krystin Ver Linden; they divorced in 2017. He deleted his Twitter and Instagram accounts in June 2020.

== Filmography ==
Year	Title	Director	Writer	Notes
2012	Chronicle	Yes	Story	Co-wrote story with Max Landis
2015	Fantastic Four	Yes	Yes	Co-wrote with Jeremy Slater and Simon Kinberg
2020	Capone	Yes	Yes	Also editor

Acting credits

Year	Title	Role	Notes
2009	Big Fan	Wrong Phil's Buddy	
2013	Arrested Development	Process Server Bum	Episode "A New Start"
2020	Capone	Agent Clifford M. Harris	
2021	On Cinema	Himself	Episode: "The Eighth On Cinema Oscar Special"

Other credits

Year	Title	Role
2009	Big Fan	Co-producer, editor and second unit director
2011	The Lie	Second unit director
2021	Happily	Thanks

== Awards and nominations ==
Year	Award	Category	Work	Result	Source
2013	Online Film & Television Association	Best Feature Debut	Chronicle	Nominated	
2015	Razzie Awards	Worst Director	Fantastic Four	Won	
2015	Razzie Awards	Worst Screenplay	Fantastic Four	Nominated	
