= Big Fan =

- Theatrical release poster
- Directed by: Robert D. Siegel
- Written by: Robert D. Siegel
- Produced by: Jean Kouremetis; Elan Bogarin
- Starring: Patton Oswalt; Kevin Corrigan; Michael Rapaport; Marcia Jean Kurtz
- Cinematography: Michael Simmonds
- Edited by: Josh Trank
- Music by: Philip Watts
- Distributed by: First Independent Pictures
- Release date: August 28, 2009
- Running time: 88 minutes
- Country: United States
- Language: English
- Budget: $5 million
- Box office: $234,540

Big Fan is a 2009 American dramedy film written and directed by Robert D. Siegel, and starring Patton Oswalt, Kevin Corrigan, Marcia Jean Kurtz, Michael Rapaport, and Scott Ferrall. The story revolves around the bleak yet amiable life of the self-described "world's biggest New York Giants fan", Paul Aufiero (Oswalt). Big Fan garnered positive reviews at the 2009 Sundance Film Festival. The film had a limited release in the United States beginning on August 28, 2009.

== Plot ==
Paul Aufiero is a parking garage attendant who lives with his mother in Staten Island, New York, and relentlessly follows the New York Giants football team. He and his friend Sal faithfully attend each Giants game; however, as they can't afford tickets, they content themselves with watching the games on a battery-powered TV in the stadium parking lot. Paul is also a regular caller to the Sports Dogg's radio talk show, where he refers to himself as "Paul from Staten Island", rants in support of the Giants, and berates his on-air rival, Philadelphia Eagles fanatic "Philadelphia Phil". Paul's family criticizes him for doing nothing with his life. He disregards their scorn and happily devotes himself to his beloved team.

One day Paul and Sal spot Giants star and Paul's favorite player Quantrell Bishop and his entourage in Staten Island. They follow Bishop to a drug deal in Stapleton. Though the pair see Bishop buying something, they naively fail to recognize the transaction. Paul and Sal then follow Bishop into a strip club in Manhattan where they introduce themselves. All goes well until the two fans innocently mention that they saw Bishop in Stapleton. An enraged Bishop brutally beats Paul, who wakes up in a hospital three days later.

Bishop is suspended from the team. Paul's personal-injury lawyer brother Jeff and NYPD Detective Velardi press Paul to bring charges against Bishop, but Paul refuses, worried about the effect on the Giants' performance if they lose their star linebacker. The charges against Bishop are eventually dropped and he returns to the team.

Jeff files a $77 million civil lawsuit against Bishop as Paul's legal guardian, claiming Paul is mentally incompetent and can't bring a lawsuit himself. When a reporter phones Paul to ask him about the lawsuit, Paul becomes livid and confronts Jeff as he sits on the toilet. Jeff and Paul's mother urge Paul to get mental help.

Philadelphia Phil researches Paul on the Internet and reveals on Sports Dogg's show that the victim of the Quantrell Bishop beating is "Paul from Staten Island", humiliating him. Paul heads for Philadelphia to confront Phil. Disguised as an Eagles fanatic, Paul identifies Phil in a local bar and gains his trust as they watch the Giants and Eagles play the season's pivotal final game. The Eagles dominate the Giants, and the crowd in the bar derides the Giants with increasing enthusiasm, much to Paul's consternation. As the Eagles fans celebrate their victory, Paul follows Phil into the men's room and pulls a gun on him, shooting Phil multiple times. Phil, lying shocked on the men's room floor, stares at his hands, which are now covered in red and blue, the Giants' colors. The gun is revealed to be a paintball gun. Paul growls "Eagles suck!" and flees from the bar.

Paul is arrested and imprisoned for the assault. Sal visits Paul in jail and reveals to him the Giants' schedule for the following season. A key game coincides with the week Paul is scheduled to be released, and an overjoyed Paul says "It's going to be a great year".

== Cast ==
- Patton Oswalt as Paul Aufiero
- Kevin Corrigan as Sal
- Michael Rapaport as Philadelphia Phil
- Marcia Jean Kurtz as Theresa Aufiero
- Matt Servitto as Detective Velarde
- Serafina Fiore as Gina
- Gino Cafarelli as Jeff Aufiero
- Jonathan Hamm as Quantrell Bishop
- Polly Humphreys as Christine
- Scott Ferrall as Sports Dogg
- Sharoz Makarechi as Production Designer
- Josh Trank as Wrong Phil's Buddy

== Reception ==
Big Fan received mostly positive reviews from critics. Rotten Tomatoes gives the film a rating of 85%, based on 89 reviews, and an average rating of 7.1/10. The website's critical consensus reads, "Featuring Patton Oswalt's sympathetic portrayal, Big Fan humorously and effectively captures the dark and lonely world of a sports fanatic." Metacritic gives the film a score of 70 out of 100, based on 27 critics, indicating "generally favorable" reviews.

The New York Times gave the film a positive review, describing it as an "agreeably low-key and modest film."
