= Blind Justice (TV series) =

- Genre: Crime drama; Police procedural
- Created by: Steven Bochco; Matt Olmstead; Nicholas Wootton
- Starring: Ron Eldard; Marisol Nichols; Rena Sofer; Reno Wilson; Frank Grillo; Michael Gaston; Saul Rubinek
- Composer: Mike Post
- Country of origin: United States
- Original language: English
- No. of seasons: 1
- No. of episodes: 13

Production
- Executive producers: Steven Bochco; Kevin Hooks; Rick Wallace
- Running time: 42 minutes
- Production companies: Steven Bochco Productions; Paramount Network Television

Original release
- Network: ABC
- Release: March 8 – June 21, 2005

Blind Justice is an American crime drama television series created by Steven Bochco about a blind New York City police detective. It aired on ABC from March 8 to June 21, 2005, to fill the time slot left by Bochco's highly successful NYPD Blue, which had just aired its final episode after a 12-year run. The show ran for only one season, with 13 episodes broadcast.

== Plot ==
A New York City police detective named Jim Dunbar and his partner are ambushed by a gunman with an AK-47. Three other officers are out of ammunition, and Dunbar's partner is frozen in fear. Dunbar takes action but also takes a bullet leaving him blind. He sues the police force and is allowed to keep his job despite his blindness. He is partnered with Detective Karen Bettancourt who doubts his ability to effectively do his job. He also must deal with self-doubt and his wife Christie's doubts by seeing a psychiatrist.

== Cast ==
- Ron Eldard as Detective Jim Dunbar
- Marisol Nichols as Detective Karen Bettancourt
- Rena Sofer as Christie Dunbar
- Reno Wilson as Detective Tom Selway
- Frank Grillo as Detective Marty Russo
- Michael Gaston as Lt. Gary Fisk
- Saul Rubinek as Dr. Alan Galloway

== Production ==
Blind Justice is a co-production of Steven Bochco Productions and Paramount Television. In 2003 during early pre-production on the then-untitled series Bochco said of Blind Justice, "it ain't like any cop show you've ever seen before." Bochco said he got the idea for the series from seeing The Blind Boys of Alabama at a concert in Hollywood and noticing how they came on stage in a line, each holding on to the shoulder of the man in front of him. On May 18, 2004, ABC announced that they had ordered Blind Justice as a mid-season replacement to fill the spot in their scheduled left by NYPD Blue which was to end part way through the 2004-05 television season. The start of production on the series in Los Angeles was announced on October 25, 2004.

The main setting of the series is the police precinct in New York City's Chinatown. Exterior shots were filmed at a precinct in Brooklyn. The pilot was filmed in part on location in New York and on the stages of 20th Century Fox and on the streets of Los Angeles. The pilot episode had its first public screening in mid-January, 2005 at the Mall of America in Minneapolis, Minnesota as part of ABC's attempt to promote their mid-season schedule. The other shows premiering were Grey's Anatomy, Eyes, Supernanny, and Jake in Progress.

Kramer Morgenthau was the cinematographer for the pilot and together with director Gary Fleder established the basic visual presentation of Blind Justice. For the series Bochco employed two cinematographers, Jeff Jur and Ric Bota, who worked on alternate episodes to allow for more time to visually develop the individual episodes. Blind Justice was the first scripted series to be broadcast on ABC with video description for the visually impaired, where available (FCC regulations for Descriptive Video Service would not come into force for seven more years).

== Reception ==
Kevin D. Thompson of Cox News Service said Blind Justice is "worth your attention mostly because of Ron Eldard's standout performance as Dunbar", a character whom he described as "one of TV's most intriguing new characters." Vikki Ortiz of the Milwaukee Journal Sentinel watched the premiere with members of the Badger Association of the Blind and Visually Impaired in Milwaukee and found that generally they considered it a realistic portrayal of what it is like to be blind, citing use of proper commands being given to his guide dog and having Detective Bettancourt lead him with her arm. Ortiz mentioned that several people did say that it was unrealistic that he would be allowed to carry a gun. In her review of the pilot Alessandra Stanley of The New York Times found that Blind Justice "is at its best when portraying how people react to the character Jim Dunbar". Stanley goes on to say in her review that "the scenes at the precinct when he first returns to work are intelligently and delicately written. His heroism, and the groundbreaking lawsuit he filed, turned him into a celebrity cop, and his colleagues on the force greet him with graceless courtesy and palpable resentment. Dunbar is blind, but in a previous generation, he could have been black or female and encountered a similar kind of churlishness."

Robert Bianco of USA Today was less receptive to Blind Justice. Bianco wrote a column solely on concepts worse than Blind Justice, of which he said, "As bad ideas go, Blind Justice's gun-toting blind guy isn't even a patch on some of the truly awful concepts that have made it to series." Matthew Gilbert of The Boston Globe said Detective Dunbar "might as well be wearing a note pinned to his back reading 'I have courage, integrity, and kids really like me.'" Gilbert goes on to say that Blind Justice "settles for the sort of nobler than-thou portrayal that marred the final seasons of Bochco's NYPD Blue." He concludes his review by saying, "In the episodes sent to critics, the murder suspects are straight out of central casting, from the wigged-out serial killer to the abusive dad. Ultimately, they seem to be there merely to provide our knight in shining armor a few hard-to-miss targets." Samantha Force of The Michigan Daily said that the idea of a disabled cop returning to work was believable but that a blind cop can carry a loaded gun simply by signing a liability waiver is ridiculous. Force concedes that the show does point out its own flaws with the premise by having Dunbar's coworkers express concerns about his ability to use his gun if the need arose. Force concluded her review by saying, "this show is a good watch if the viewer is able to suspend their disbelief and take the premise at face value. For those viewers out there who want their dosage of realism in drama, Blind Justice is not the pill for you."

== Episodes ==
Blind Justice was broadcast on Tuesdays at 10:00 pm on ABC. The series finale was shown on the west coast June 21, 2005, after game 6 of the 2005 NBA Finals. As it was a regional broadcast there are no national ratings available for the episode. The series briefly had a syndicated run on Sleuth Channel in 2009.

No.	Title	Directed by	Written by	Original release date	Prod. code	U.S. viewers (millions)
1	"Pilot"	Gary Fleder	S : Steven Bochco; S/T : Matt Olmstead, Nicholas Wootton	March 8, 2005	G101	12.360
After being shot in the head during an armored truck robbery the now blind Detective Jim Dunbar returns to work seeking to resume his duties. His coworkers express grave reservations about his ability to fully do the job and his Lieutenant is hesitant to allow Dunbar to carry a gun. Dunbar is assigned to investigate what is believed to be a relatively simple car theft with Detective Bettancourt. Dunbar discovers that the car theft is connected to an ongoing serial homicide investigation.
2	"Four Feet Under"	Gary Fleder	Nicholas Wootton	March 15, 2005	G102	10.510
When a 12-year-old boy is found murdered a known pædophile is the prime suspect. Dunbar's insecurites come to a head when he breaks out in a jealous rage at a dinner party because he believes his wife's boss is flirting with her right in front of him. Unresolved issues about Dunbar's own past infidelities threaten to end his marriage.
3	"Rub a Tub Tub"	Gary Fleder	Matt Olmstead	March 22, 2005	G103	9.550
When one of their own, Detective Carl Desmond from anti-crime, is found murdered the precinct is on alert. With everyone, including Desomnd's widow, believing it was someone Desmond had previously arrested who took revenge they are looking for a suspect among those recently release from prison. Dunbar believes that it was Desmond's former partner who killed him and that he is involved with Desmond's widow. Marty continues to make Dunbar's return to work difficult by rearranging the precinct desks so that Dunbar is walking into them.
4	"Up on the Roof"	John Badham	Elwood Reid	March 29, 2005	G104	7.940
Dunbar is having recurring nightmares about Terry Jansen, his former partner, hiding in fear during an armored truck robbery which resulted in his being shot and blinded. Dunbar and Bettancourt are forced to work with Jansen, who had transferred to a different precinct, and his new partner to solve a series of gang murders.
5	"Marlon's Brando"	Jeremy Kagan	Michael Oates Palmer	April 5, 2005	G105	8.410
6	"Seoul Man"	Bobby Roth	Russell Gewirtz	April 12, 2005	G106	8.140
7	"Leap of Faith"	Michael Apted	Nicholas Wootton	April 19, 2005	G107	8.060
8	"Past Imperfect"	Guy Ferland	Matt Olmstead	April 26, 2005	G108	7.230
9	"In Your Face"	John Badham	Michael Oates Palmer	May 3, 2005	G109	6.000
10	"Doggone"	Bobby Roth	Russell Gewirtz	May 10, 2005	G110	6.300
11	"Dance with Me"	John Hyams	Nicholas Wootton & Matt Olmstead	May 17, 2005	G111	6.050
12	"Under the Gun"	Rick Wallace	Matt Olmstead & Nicholas Wootton	May 31, 2005	G112	6.380
13	"Fancy Footwork"	Bobby Roth	Nicholas Wootton & Matt Olmstead	June 21, 2005	G113	N/A

== International broadcasters ==
Country	Channel	Notes
Australia	Network Ten	
Brazil	AXN	
Canada	Global	
Croatia	Nova TV	
Denmark	DR1	
Finland	MTV3	12 January - 5 April 2008
France	M6, Paris Première	
Germany	Kabel 1	
Hungary	TV2	11 October 2006 - 17 January 2007
Ireland	Channel 6	aired in 2006
Italy	Rai Tre, Fox Crime	
South Korea	KBS	(hangul:블라인드 저스티스)
Latin America	Fox Latin America	
Latvia	Fox Crime	
Lithuania	Lietuvos ryto TV	
Poland	AXN	
Russia	FOX Crime Russia	Слепое правосудие
Serbia	TV Avala	
South Africa	SABC3	
Spain	Telecinco	
Sweden	SVT2	
Turkey	DiziMax	
United Kingdom	FX	
United States	ABC	
