= Mae Capone =

Wife of Al Capone (1897–1986)

- Born: Mary Josephine Coughlin; April 11, 1897; New York City, U.S.
- Died: April 16, 1986 (aged 89); Hollywood, Florida, U.S.
- Spouse: Al Capone (m. 1918; died 1947)

Mary Josephine Capone (née Coughlin; April 11, 1897 – April 16, 1986) was the American wife of gangster Al Capone. Although not directly involved in her husband's illegal activities, she managed his financial affairs during and after his time in prison.

== Early life ==
Mary "Mae" Josephine Coughlin was born in Brooklyn, New York, to Bridget Gorman and Michael (Mike) Coughlin on April 11, 1897. Her parents immigrated to the U.S. from Ireland separately in the 1890s. Michael was a laborer, Bridget did housework. They met in New York and were married. They had six children, Anna, Mary, Dennis, Catherine, Agnes, and Walter. She attended school until she started working as a sales clerk.

== Family life ==
=== Marriage and family ===
Mae Coughlin married Alphonse Capone on December 30, 1918, at the St. Mary Star of the Sea Church in Brooklyn, New York. They either met at a party in the Carroll Gardens neighborhood of Brooklyn, or their marriage was arranged by Al's mother, who knew Mae from church. Mae was two years older than her husband. On their marriage certificate, Al increased his age by one year, and Mae decreased her age by two years, making them both appear 20 years old. Despite the rivalry between Italian-American and Irish-American groups at the time, there is no evidence that Capone's parents opposed their marriage. It is speculated that Al's parents were probably in favor of the union, because an Irish partner was seen as higher status than an Italian at the time. In addition to their differences in ethnicity, Mae was also more educated, more Catholic, and more middle class, while her husband was less educated, and grew up in a rougher part of town. Mae Capone remained a devoted Catholic throughout her entire life.

Three weeks before their wedding, Mae reportedly gave birth to a son, Albert Francis "Sonny" Capone. The couple had no more children. As reported by Deirdre Capone, a great-niece of Al Capone (the granddaughter of Ralph Capone), this was because Capone was sterile due to a birth defect. Other sources claim that she contracted syphilis from Al, which caused each subsequent try for another child to end in miscarriage or stillbirth.

From a young age, Sonny showed signs of being hard of hearing. This supposedly was because Mae had transmitted syphilis to him as well. When Sonny developed a mastoid ear infection, Al and Mae Capone traveled from Chicago to New York to ensure he got the best care. She also filed a lawsuit when her grandchildren were being bullied in school for being a Capone, following the release of the TV series, The Untouchables.

==== Involvement in Al's gang life ====
Mae was not involved in Al's racketeering business, although she was affected by the actions. Al took in dating other women while they were married. She once told her son "not to do what your father did. He broke my heart." Her hair also started to gray when she was 28, presumably due to stress regarding her husband's situation. Al was ultimately sentenced to 11 years of imprisonment on October 24, 1931, and Mae was one of three people allowed to visit him in prison. The other two were Al's mother and son. Mae remained a devoted wife, frequently sending letters to her husband, referring to him as "honey", and expressing her longing for him to return home. She visited him in person as well, traveling up to 3,000 miles from the Capones' Florida home to Alcatraz, usually going to lengths to obscure her face in order to avoid the paparazzi. From Al's imprisonment up until his death, Mae, along with Al's brothers and sisters, was in charge of his affairs: possessions, titles, and belongings.

Al was finally released from prison and arrived at the Capones' Florida home on March 22, 1940. Mae was Al's primary caretaker following his release from prison. He died January 25, 1947, in their Miami home. He was buried in a Catholic cemetery in Hillside, Illinois. Mae was distraught following his death, and remained out of the public spotlight thereafter.

==== Financial well-being ====
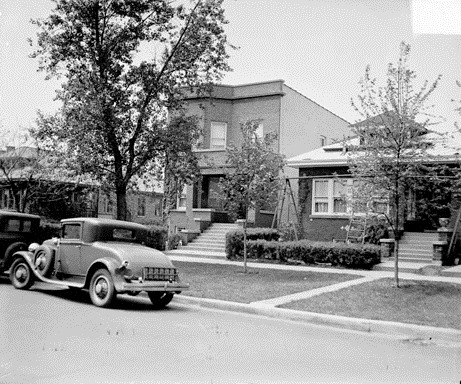
Capone home, a two-storied building, Chicago, Illinois, 1929

Al's racketeering business provided well for the family.

In 1920 or 1921 or 1923, Capone purchased a two-storey two-flat six-bedroom building, on a 68-foot-wide double lot, built in 1905, and moved in on August 8, 1923, at 7244 South Prairie Avenue in the Park Manor neighborhood in Greater Grand Crossing, Chicago for $5,500, to house Mae and Sonny, as well as other members of the Capone family. Mae and Sonny did not make the move from Brooklyn to Chicago to join Al until 1923.

He also bought a second home for his family in Palm Island, Florida. Mae had the liberty to decorate the home lavishly. When Capone's Palm Island home was burgled, an estimated $300,000 worth of Mae's jewelry (equivalent to $5,781,873 in 2025) was stolen.

The family owned several cars: a couple of Lincolns and a custom-designed cabriolet (similar to a Cadillac) that Mae herself drove.

They lived comfortably, and had enough money to pay off bill collectors when their bills were overdue.

== Legal issues ==
=== Lawsuits ===
In 1936 the federal government filed a tax lien of $51,498.08 on the Capones' Miami estate. Having purchased the estate under Mae's name, and Al being in jail, Mae was left to deal with the lien. She paid it. In 1937, she filed a lawsuit against J. Edwin Larsen, the collector for the Internal Revenue Service, on claims that the tax lien money had been collected illegally. Her request for a refund of $52,103.30 was denied.

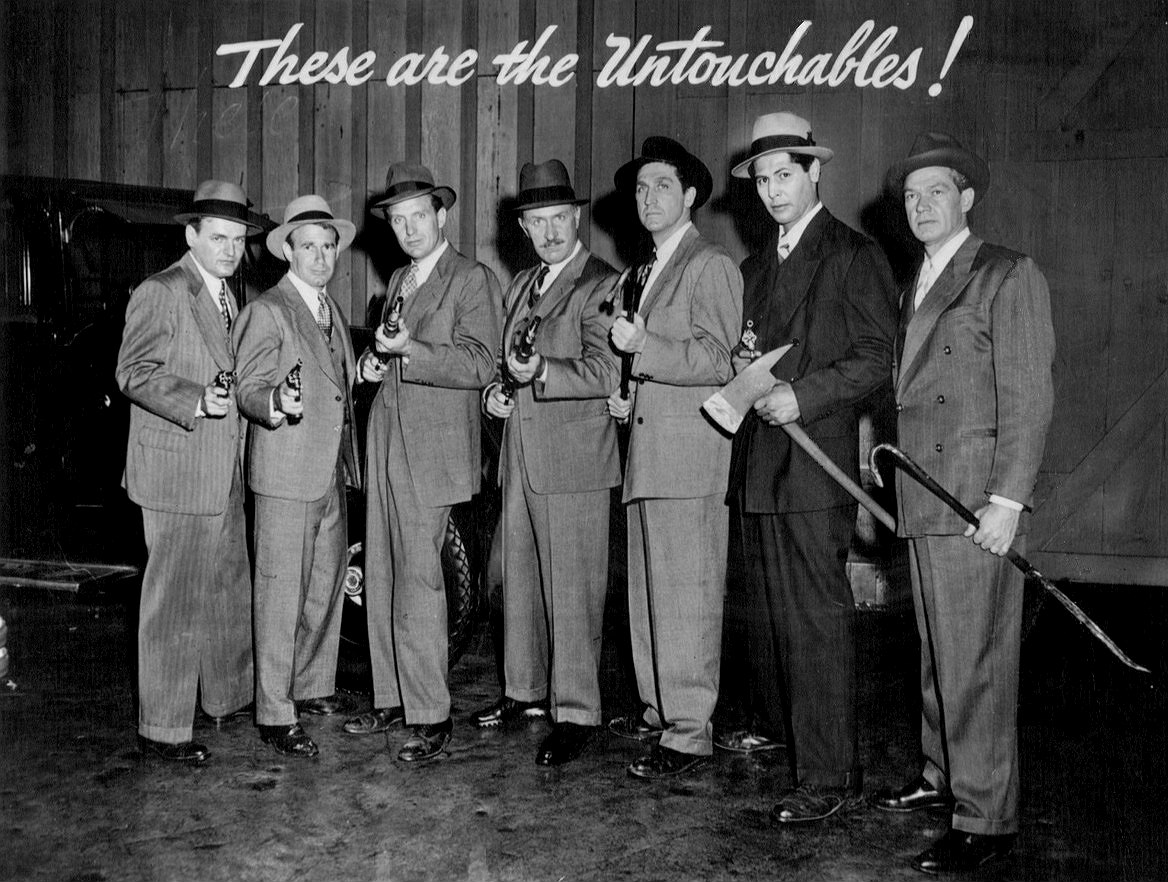
The cast of The Untouchables

In 1959, Desilu Productions released a two-part series called The Untouchables. The series was about Prohibition agents fighting crime. In 1960, Capone, her son, and Al's sister, Mafalda Maritote, sued Desilu Productions, Inc., Columbia Broadcasting System and Westinghouse Electric Corporation, for $6 million in damages. They claimed the series infringed on their privacy and had caused them humiliation and shame. Sonny Capone claimed that his children had been made fun of in school, so much that he was forced to pick up and move his family to another city. The federal District Court and Chicago Circuit Court rejected the suit. When the plaintiffs appealed to the U.S. Supreme Court, their appeal was rejected as well, on the basis that privacy rights are personal and do not extend to next of kin.

== Death ==
Capone died on April 16, 1986, at the age of 89, at a nursing home in Hollywood, Florida. She was buried in Florida. She was viewed and then cremated at 401 NW 44th Street (aka West Prospect Road), Oakland Park, Florida.

== In popular culture ==
Josh Humphrey wrote a poem titled, "A Poem about Al Capone's Wife". The poem is written from Mae's point of view. It captures both the heartache and feelings of devotion she might have experienced.

Mae Capone has been portrayed by the following:

- Marcella Lentz-Pope on HBO's Boardwalk Empire (TV series).
- Linda Cardellini in the 2020 biographical film Capone.
