= Russell Gewirtz =

American screenwriter (born 1967)

- Born: 1967 (age 58–59); Great Neck, New York, United States
- Occupation: Writer

Russell Gewirtz (born 1967 in Great Neck, New York) is an American screenwriter and lawyer, best known for writing the screenplay for Spike Lee's 2006 film Inside Man.

== Life and career ==
Gewirtz attended Trinity School in New York City before earning a degree in computer science from Tufts University. He then attended Benjamin N. Cardozo School of Law in Manhattan, and because "one law degree wasn't enough," he earned an LL.M. in Taxation from the NYU School of Law. "I don't carry a business card. But if I did, it would say Esq., B.A., J.D., LL.M. after my name." Gewirtz spent his summers at Camp Swago in Damascus, Pennsylvania. After passing the bar exam, Gewirtz went to work for his father running a small chain of clothing stores. After brokering a lucrative real estate deal in 1999, he left New York for several years and spent time in France and Brazil. It was at the 2001 Cannes Film Festival that he originally pitched the idea for Inside Man to Daniel Rosenberg and became a Hollywood screenwriter.

He wrote two episodes for TV series Blind Justice in 2005, after penning Inside Man.

Gewirtz's second screenplay was Righteous Kill, a thriller starring Al Pacino and Robert De Niro, which received mainly negative reviews. and grossed $78.4 million.

== Filmography ==
=== Films ===
- Inside Man (2006)
- Righteous Kill (2008)

=== Television ===
- Blind Justice (2005)
