= Inside Man =

2006 American film by Spike Lee

- Theatrical release poster
- Directed by: Spike Lee
- Written by: Russell Gewirtz
- Produced by: Brian Grazer
- Starring: Denzel Washington; Clive Owen; Jodie Foster; Christopher Plummer; Willem Dafoe; Chiwetel Ejiofor
- Cinematography: Matthew Libatique
- Edited by: Barry Alexander Brown
- Music by: Terence Blanchard
- Production companies: Universal Pictures; Imagine Entertainment; 40 Acres and a Mule Filmworks
- Distributed by: Universal Pictures
- Release dates: March 16, 2006 (Netherlands); March 24, 2006 (United States)
- Running time: 129 minutes
- Country: United States
- Language: English
- Budget: $45–60 million
- Box office: $184.4 million

Inside Man is a 2006 American crime thriller film directed by Spike Lee and written by Russell Gewirtz. It centers on an elaborate bank heist-turned-hostage situation on Wall Street. The film stars Denzel Washington as Detective Keith Frazier, the NYPD's hostage negotiator, Clive Owen as Dalton Russell, the mastermind who orchestrates the heist, and Jodie Foster as Madeleine White, a Manhattan fixer who becomes involved at the request of the bank's founder Arthur Case (Christopher Plummer).

Gewirtz spent five years developing the premise before working on what became his first original screenplay. After he completed the script in 2002, Imagine Entertainment purchased it to be made by Universal Pictures, with Imagine co-founder Ron Howard attached to direct. After Howard stepped down, his business partner Brian Grazer began looking for a new director and ultimately hired Lee. Principal photography took place on location in New York City from June to August 2005. With a $45–60 million budget, it is Lee's most expensive film.

Inside Man premiered in New York on March 20, 2006, and was released by Universal Pictures across the United States four days later. It received generally positive reviews from critics and grossed $184.4 million, becoming Lee's highest-grossing film.

== Plot ==
In August 2005, inside a small, dimly-lit cell, Dalton Russell proclaims he has committed the perfect bank robbery. Some time prior, in New York City, masked robbers, dressed in painter coveralls and using variants of the name "Steve" as aliases, seize control of a Manhattan bank, taking patrons and employees hostage. They divide the hostages into groups and hold them in different rooms, forcing them to don masks and coveralls identical to their own, rotating them among various rooms and occasionally inserting themselves covertly into the groups. They also take turns demolishing and building a replacement fake wall in one of the bank's storage rooms.

Police surround the bank, and Detectives Keith Frazier and Bill Mitchell take charge of negotiations. Russell, the head robber, demands food be provided. The police send pizzas whose boxes have hidden listening devices. The bugs pick up someone speaking Albanian (initially misunderstood to be Russian), which is later identified as propaganda recordings of the late Albanian leader Enver Hoxha, implying that the robbers anticipated the attempted surveillance.

When Arthur Case, the bank's founder and chairman, learns about the holdup, he hires fixer Madeleine White to try to protect the contents of a safe deposit box within the bank. Russell breaks into a safe deposit box and finds, among other things, documents from Nazi Germany. White, using her influence with the Mayor of New York, is introduced to Frazier and persuades him to let her talk to Russell, who agrees to allow her inside the bank so they can talk privately. Russell implies that Case started his bank with money he received for collaborating with the Nazis, resulting in many Jews dying during World War II.

Frazier demands to inspect the hostages before allowing the robbers to leave and Russell shows him around the bank. As he is being shown out, Frazier attacks Russell, but is restrained by another robber. Afterwards, Frazier explains he deliberately provoked him, concluding that Russell is not a killer. However, Frazier's conclusion is almost immediately tested when a hostage execution is staged. The execution prompts an Emergency Services Unit team into action. They plan to storm the bank, using rubber bullets to knock out those inside. Frazier discovers that the robbers have planted a listening device on the police; aware of the police plans, the robbers detonate smoke grenades and exit the bank hidden among the hostages.

The police detain and question everyone but cannot distinguish the identically dressed hostages from the robbers. A search of the bank reveals the robbers' weapons were plastic replicas. They find props showing that the hostage execution was faked, and no money or valuables appear to have been stolen. Unable to identify the suspects and unable to show a robbery has even been committed, Frazier's superior orders him to drop the case. Frazier, however, searches bank records and finds that safe deposit box No. 392 has never appeared on any records since the bank's founding in 1948. He obtains a search warrant to open it. White then confronts Frazier to persuade him to drop his investigation and during their conversation she hints at Case's Nazi dealings. Frazier refuses to stop his investigation and plays a recording he had surreptitiously made of an incriminating conversation that took place earlier between White and Frazier and the mayor. White confronts Case, who admits the box contained loose diamonds and a Cartier diamond ring he took from a Jewish friend whom he betrayed to the Nazis.

Russell's opening monologue is revealed to have happened while he hid behind a fake wall the robbers had constructed inside the bank's supply room. He emerges a week after the robbery with the contents of Case's safe deposit box, including incriminating documents and several bags of diamonds. On his way out, he bumps into Frazier, who does not recognize him. Russell exits the bank and enters a waiting car filled with his conspirators, some of whom the police had questioned. When Frazier opens the safe deposit box, he finds the ring and a note from Russell that says, "follow the ring". He confronts White, urging her to contact the Office of War Crimes Issues at the State Department about Case's war crimes. At home, Frazier finds a loose diamond and realizes that Russell slipped it into his pocket during their collision while exiting the bank.

== Cast ==
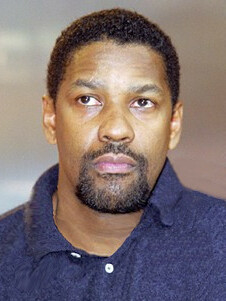
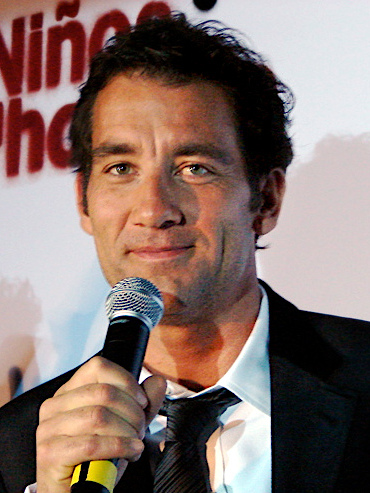
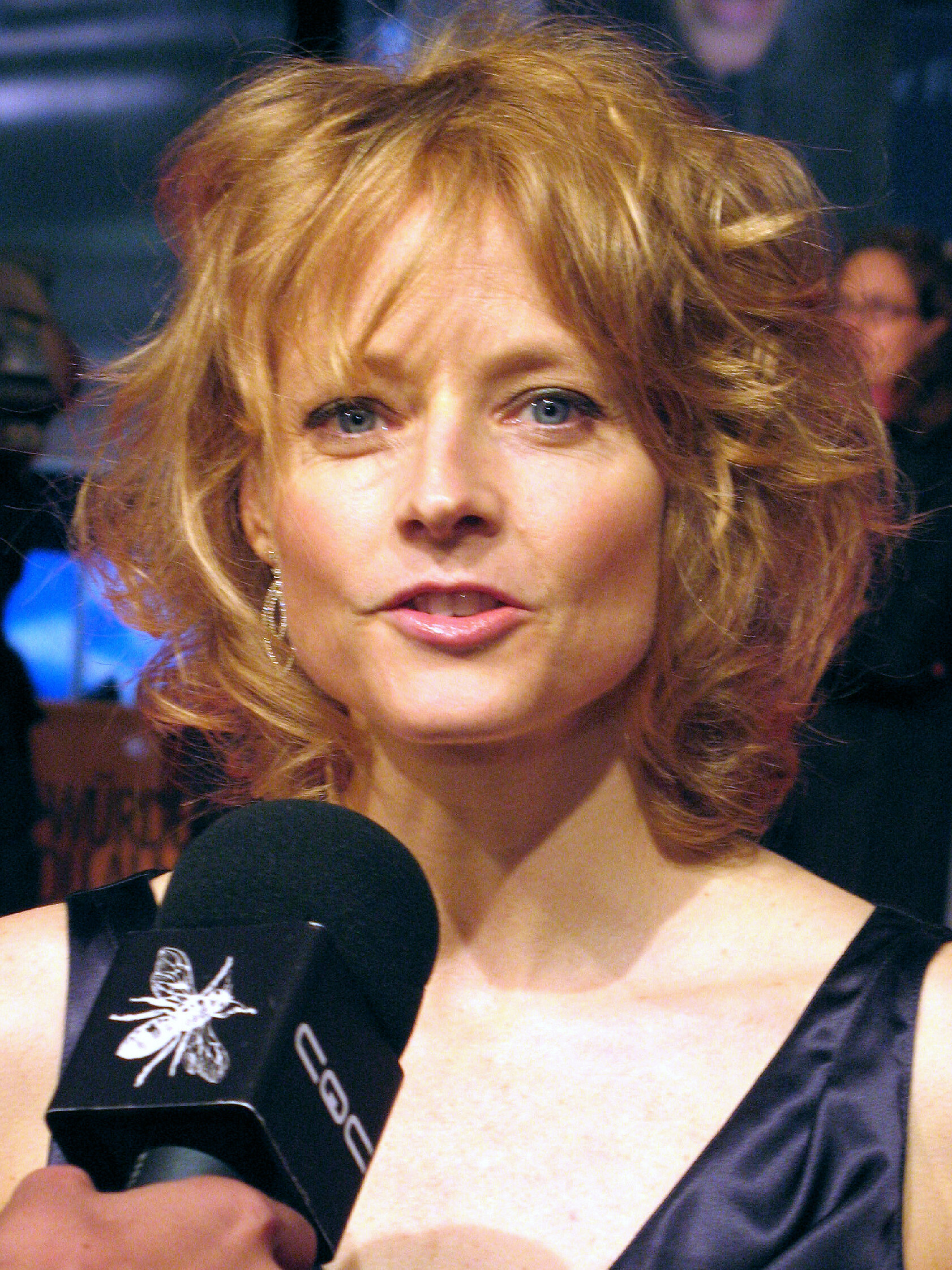
Inside Man stars Denzel Washington, Clive Owen and Jodie Foster.
- Denzel Washington as Detective Keith Frazier, New York City police detective with a scandal attached to his name who is desperate to make Detective First Grade. He is assigned to negotiate with the ringleader of a Manhattan bank heist. The film marks Washington's fourth collaboration with director Spike Lee. Lee first approached Washington and gave him the opportunity to play either Frazier or Dalton Russell. Washington turned down the latter, citing concerns over the character's disguise. He cited his Broadway performance as Brutus in Julius Caesar as inspiration, stating, "I think it actually helped me prepare for Frazier—Russell [Gewirtz]'s script is heavy with great dialogue. My character does a lot of talking! I kind of thought of Frazier as Brutus goes to Brooklyn. For me, there is a certain rhythm and cadence of New Yorkers, and this gave me the opportunity to play a New York kind of guy who's going through a lot while dealing with this smart and challenging adversary."
- Clive Owen as Dalton Russell, the ringleader of the elaborate bank heist. Russell first appears at the beginning of the film, breaking the fourth wall and giving an account of how he will commit the perfect bank robbery. Owen nearly turned down the role; like Washington, he expressed concerns over the character's disguise of a hood, mask and sunglasses. He said, "To play whole scenes where you're masked, you've got on sunglasses and you're wearing a hood is very weird, because a lot of acting is often through intent, and intent is shown through the eyes. To suddenly have that taken away and have this big barrier there was very disarming." Owen, however, accepted the role after further discussing the part with Lee. The script was also revised to include scenes in which Owen's face could be shown.
- Jodie Foster as Madeleine White, Manhattan power broker who is hired to act as a "fixer" in response to the bank heist. Foster saw the film as an opportunity to collaborate with Lee, explaining, "Spike is somebody who always fascinated me, and I've loved his movies. I've always wanted to be involved in something he's making." She described her character as a woman with "a relaxed kind of witty quality to her. All the while being very strong, not having to raise her voice very much, not having to yell at anybody — she's got authority. There's seductiveness, a charm, if you will, to her ability to get into people's psyches that's been immensely fun to play. It all went way too fast for me."
- Christopher Plummer as Arthur Case, the chairman of the board of directors and founder of the fictional Manhattan Trust bank. In response to the bank heist, Case hires White to prevent a possible career-ending situation. Inside Man is Plummer's second collaboration with Lee and Washington, following 1992's Malcolm X. He described Case as a "wonderful, rich head of all sorts of organizations — I suppose a kind of 'Enron creature' — who runs banks and other world businesses. He has tentacles everywhere, and he's a real son-of-a-bitch who's trying to keep a secret in the process."
- Willem Dafoe as Captain John Darius, veteran captain of the NYPD Emergency Service Unit. Dafoe saw the film as opportunity to work in New York City and collaborate with Lee. He felt that the film was "about the city; it's about authority; it's about the mentality of crime; and it's about power ... and payback."
- Chiwetel Ejiofor as Detective Bill Mitchell, New York City police detective and Frazier's partner. The film is Ejiofor's second collaboration with Lee, after She Hate Me (2004). He first learned of the film after meeting with the director. He explained, "He said he wanted me to read the script and see if I wanted to be involved. Spike asks so many people to come back and work with him in different capacities and as different types of characters."

Appearing as Russell's accomplices are:

- Kim Director as Valerie Keepsake/Stevie, Russell's girlfriend who keeps the female hostages under control.
- James Ransone as Darius Peltz/Steve-O, who protects Russell when Frazier attempts to apprehend him.
- Carlos Andrés Gómez as Kenneth Damerjian/Steve, an Armenian who uses recordings on his iPod of Albanian leader Enver Hoxha to throw off the police wiretap.
- Bernie Rachelle as Chaim, an older Jewish man who works as a professor at Columbia Law School, who teaches courses on genocide, slave labor, and war reparation claims, who is part of the plot but was not one of the "Steves", given his age and physique.

Appearing as some of the hostages are Ken Leung as Wing, who was distracted in the bank before the heist by Nancy Mann (played by Samantha Ivers) standing behind him and talking loudly on her phone; Gerry Vichi as Herman Gluck, an elderly hostage suffering chest pains who is quickly released by the robbers; Waris Ahluwalia as Vikram Walia, a Sikh bank clerk whose turban is removed by the cops, which is a religious sacrilege for a Sikh male; Peter Frechette as Peter Hammond, a bank employee whose attempt to hide his cell phone from Russell results in his getting beaten up; Amir Ali Said as Brian Robinson, an 8-year-old boy who speaks with both Russell and Frazier and who plays a violent video game; Ed Onipede Blunt as Ray Robinson, Brian's father; and Marcia Jean Kurtz as Miriam Douglas, an older woman who initially refuses to strip and is forced to do so by Stevie; Kurtz reprises her role as Miriam from Dog Day Afternoon (1975), in which she was depicted as a hostage. Lionel Pina, who also appeared in Dog Day Afternoon as a pizza delivery man, reprises his role in Inside Man as one of the policemen delivering pizzas to the bank's front doors.

Other roles include Cassandra Freeman as Officer Sylvia, Frazier's girlfriend; Peter Gerety as Captain Coughlin, Frazier and Mitchell's superior; Victor Colicchio as Sergeant Collins, the first officer to respond to the bank robbery; Jason Manuel Olazabal as ESU Officer Hernandez; Al Palagonia as Kevin, a construction worker who recognizes the language as Albanian, as he was formerly married to an Albanian-born woman; Florina Petcu as Ilina Miritia, the Albanian woman in question who explains that they are hearing recordings of Enver Hoxha; Peter Kybart as the Mayor of New York City; Anthony Mangano as an ESU officer; and Daryl Mitchell and Ashlie Atkinson as Mobile Command Officers.

== Production ==
A script has to make me feel curious, and at no point can I feel complacent. In this story, it was the red herring aspect that I liked—not knowing why things were happening and later having everything revealed in such a satisfying and surprising way. These twists and turns really took the model of a heist film in a new and interesting direction.

— Producer Brian Grazer on the script for Inside Man.

=== Development ===
The script for Inside Man was written by Russell Gewirtz, a former lawyer who conceived the idea while vacationing in several countries. A first-time screenwriter, Gewirtz studied a number of screenplays, and spent five years developing the premise. His friend Daniel M. Rosenberg assisted in developing the script, then known as The Inside Man. After it was completed in 2002, the script was passed around several times. Rosenberg shopped it to a number of Los Angeles agencies, until Universal Pictures executives Scott Stuber and Donna Langley persuaded Gewirtz to take the script to Universal and Imagine Entertainment. Imagine purchased Gewirtz's screenplay in 2002, and the project began development at Universal, which retitled the film Inside Man.

Imagine co-founder Ron Howard was attached to direct the film, but turned it down after being asked by Russell Crowe to direct Cinderella Man (2005). Howard's Imagine partner Brian Grazer began looking for a new director. After Howard stepped down, Menno Meyjes contributed to Gewirtz's screenplay, and Terry George incorporated the Nazi Germany and diamond ring elements to the script. Meyjes was in negotiations to direct the film, but after he declined, Grazer thought this project was a chance to work with Spike Lee, who had already learned of Gewirtz's script. Lee said of the screenplay, "I liked the script and really wanted to do it. 'Dog Day Afternoon (1975)', directed by Sidney Lumet, is one of my favorite films, and this story was a contemporary take on that kind of a movie". Ultimately, Marcia Jean Kurtz and Lionel Pina were additionally cast to reprise their roles from Dog Day Afternoon in Easter egg cameo appearances.

After being cast, Denzel Washington and Chiwetel Ejiofor worked together on studying their lines and understanding their characters. Lee helped prepare his actors by screening a number of heist films including Dog Day Afternoon. Washington, Ejiofor, Willem Dafoe and other actors met and worked with members of the New York City Police Department, who shared their experiences and stories involving civilians and hostage situations.

=== Filming ===
==== Principal photography ====
The film was shot on location in New York City, with principal photography beginning in June 2005. Universal Pictures provided a budget of $45 million. By filming in New York, the production was eligible for the city's "Made in NY" incentives program. Interior sets were created at the New York-based Steiner Studios, and Inside Man was the second film (after 2005's The Producers) to be shot inside the 15-acre facility.

Location scouting revealed a former Wall Street bank at 20 Exchange Place had been closed down and repurposed as a cigar bar. The building stood in for the fictional Manhattan Trust Bank branch, where the bank heist occurs. "Without a bank, we didn't have a movie," Lee explained. "But everything ended up going very smoothly. We shot in the heart of Wall Street in a bank that had been closed down. It was like having a back lot in the middle of Wall Street." An office at the Alexander Hamilton U.S. Custom House doubled as the office of Arthur Case (portrayed by Christopher Plummer). Plummer believed that the office's design was essential to his character: "The space literally presents Case's power, so I found that part of my character was to simply play very cool about everything. You don't have to push the power, because it's all around you." The location was also used to film a scene where Frazier confronts Madeleine White (Jodie Foster). The American Tract Society Building, located at 150 Nassau Street and Spruce Street, Manhattan, doubled as White's office. Cafe Bravo, a coffee shop located at 76 Beaver Street and Hanover Street, was also used for filming. Other filming locations included Battery Park and the New York Supreme Court House's Appellate Division located at East 25th Street and Madison Avenue, Manhattan. Principal photography concluded in August after 43 days of filming.

==== Design ====
Wynn Thomas supervised the production design, continuing a 20-year collaboration with Lee. With a former Wall Street bank doubling as the fictional Manhattan Trust branch, Thomas and his team restored the former bank to its 1920s architectural structure. The first floor underwent renovations and was used as the first place where the hostages are held captive by the robbers. The bank's basement was one of several interior sets created at Steiner Studios. Thomas and his team also designed Frazier's apartment, which he described as "very masculine and rich and highly monochromatic in its many hues of brown." He was also tasked with designing a police interrogation room, as well as the interiors of the New York City Police Department and a light-duty Mobile Command vehicle. An actual Mobile Command vehicle, supplied by LDV Inc., was used for exteriors.

==== Cinematography ====
[Lee] has a distinct working style; he likes to have the scene play out and get all of his coverage pretty much at the same time. He's not a single-camera-setup director who gets nine shots per scene and spends all day doing it. He prefers to get the actors blocked and find out where he can place all the cameras so he can get the scene and the performance. Because of this, the actors have to perform in every shot.

— Cinematographer Matthew Libatique describing Lee's directing style, which involved multiple-camera setups.

The film was director of photography Matthew Libatique's second collaboration with Lee. Because the filmmakers intended to finish with a digital intermediate (the post-production digital manipulation of color and lighting), Libatique chose to shoot the film in the Super 35 format for a 2.35:1 aspect ratio. He mainly used Kodak Vision2 500T 5218 and Vision2 Expression 500T 5229 film stocks. The film was shot with Arricam and Arriflex cameras and Cooke S4 lenses.

Several scenes required multiple-camera setups. Lee wanted to create a visual distinction between the characters Russell (Owen) and Frazier (Washington), while incorporating visual metaphors. Russell's scenes, in which he masterminds the bank heist, were shot with a Steadicam to suggest that the character is in control. Frazier's scenes, in which he is tasked with handling the hostage situation, were filmed with multiple hand-held cameras to display the character's confusion. Libatique explained, "I said, 'We want to create a sense of control and largely centered frames with Clive's character, and we want to have movement with Denzel's.' Having three operators on the same character, I'd watch all three. In a handheld shot, a long lens has a little bit of movement and a wider lens is inherently smoother. I would actually talk to the operator and tell him not to be so steady. It was the first time I'd worked with so many operators where I wasn't one myself." Telephone conversations between Russell and Frazier were shot using two cameras simultaneously filming the actors performing on two different sets of a soundstage at Steiner Studios. Steadicam operator Stephen Consentino estimated that 80% of the film was shot with hand-held cameras or a Steadicam. A total of seven cameras were used to film the scene where the hostages are finally released. A Technocrane was used for a crane shot that would cover the following moment, in which the hostages are placed in buses.

The film features a number of scenes which involve Detectives Frazier and Mitchell (Chiwetel Ejiofor) interrogating several hostages during the aftermath of the heist. Libatique described these scenes as a "flash-forward" to events, explaining that Lee "wanted a look that would jump out and tell you you're somewhere else." Libatique photographed the scenes with Kodak Ektachrome 100D 5285 reversal film. Technicolor then cross-processed the filmed footage before it was put through a bleach bypass, which neutralized color temperature and created more contrast. Libatique explained, "Basically, it unifies all the color ... When you try to apply correction, the film moves in very strange ways."

Post-production facility EFILM carried out the digital intermediate (DI), with Libatique overseeing the process and working with colorists Steve Bowen and Steve Scott: "It's difficult to match all of your shots meticulously when you have three cameras and one lighting setup, so I spent the majority of the DI just adhering to the original vision of the disparity in color temperature, which I can accentuate, versus the unified color temperature." A majority of Inside Man was scanned on a Northlight film scanner, while the interrogation scenes had to be scanned on a Spirit DataCine, as the negatives proved "too dense for the Northlight to perform the task."

=== Effects ===
==== Video game sequence ====
I just hope people understand that this is an absolute statement about my horror at how violent these games that young kids play are, and also the infatuation with violence and gangsta rap among the black community. It's not a real game but it's not that far-fetched from the games that are being sold, and more importantly the mindset behind them. There are just too many black men killing each other as it is.

— Lee commenting on the film's 30-second video game sequence, which was created as part of a social commentary.

The film features a scene in which Russell (Owen) interacts with Brian Robinson (Amir Ali Said), an 8-year-old boy who is playing a violent video game titled Gangstas iz Genocide on his PlayStation Portable. The scene is intercut with a 30-second animated sequence of the fictional game, in which a character performs a drive-by shooting, before killing an intended target with a hand grenade. Using the Grand Theft Auto franchise as a reference, Lee wanted the scene to serve as a social commentary on gangsta rap, violent crime among African Americans and the rising level of killings in video games.

Cinematographer Matthew Libatique enlisted his cousin, Eric Alba, and a team of graphic artists known as House of Pain to design the 30-second animated sequence. Lee asked for the sequence to show two black characters in a ghetto environment dressed in gangster attire. He also gave the artists mockups of two scenarios that ended in homicide—one being a robbery at an ATM, and the other a drive-by shooting.

House of Pain spent 10 days working on Gangstas iz Genocide. Alba digitally photographed images of buildings near the Marcy Houses in Brooklyn, New York. Portions of the sequence were pre-visualized in 3D Studio Max, while stills were imported as texture maps and added to animated cut scenes created in 3D modeling package Maya. The artists also improvised the use of a hand grenade. When Lee saw how violent the sequence was, he improvised the line "Kill Dat Nigga!" as a subtitle. The entire sequence was rendered out to play onscreen in full frame. The original running time of the animated sequence was 60 seconds. Lee cut it to 30 seconds, feeling that a shorter length would make more of an impact. Upon Inside Man's theatrical release, he remarked that, "The sad thing is somebody is probably gonna make a game out of it and take that as inspiration."

=== Music ===
Jazz musician and trumpeter Terence Blanchard composed the film score, marking his eleventh collaboration with Lee. The soundtrack features the song "Chaiyya Chaiyya", composed by A. R. Rahman, which originally appeared in the 1998 Hindi film Dil Se... The song is featured during the opening credits of the film. A remix of the song, titled "Chaiyya, Chaiyya Bollywood Joint" plays during the end credits, and features Panjabi MC's added rap lyrics about people of different backgrounds coming together in order to survive. The soundtrack, titled Inside Man: Original Motion Picture Soundtrack, was released on CD in North America on March 21, 2006, through record label Varèse Sarabande.

== Release ==
Inside Man held its premiere in New York at the Ziegfeld Theatre on March 20, 2006, coinciding with Lee's 49th birthday. On March 24, 2006, Universal Pictures released the film in 2,818 theatres in North America. The film was given the widest release of any Spike Lee film, edging out Summer of Sam (1999) by 1,282 theatres. Inside Man was also released throughout 62 foreign markets. The film was released on DVD on August 8, 2006, on HD DVD on October 23, 2007 and on Blu-ray on May 26, 2009.

== Reception ==
=== Box office ===
On its opening day in North America, the film grossed $9,440,295 with an average of $3,350 per theatre. By the end of its opening weekend, it had grossed $28,954,945, securing the number one position at the box office. Inside Man held the record for the highest opening weekend gross as a Denzel Washington starring vehicle, surpassing Man on Fire (2004) which debuted with $22.7 million on its first weekend.

Inside Man had dropped 46.7% in its second weekend, earning $15,437,760; it had dropped to second place behind Ice Age: The Meltdown. The film dropped an additional 40.9% in its third week, bringing in $9,131,410, though it remained in the Top 10 rankings for the weekend, placing fourth overall. The film remained in the top ten for the fourth weekend in a row, grossing about $6,427,815 and finishing sixth for the week. In its fifth weekend, Inside Man had grossed an additional $3,748,955, while in eighth place. In its sixth weekend, Inside Man fell out of the box office top ten, finishing eleventh with an estimated $2,081,690. The film ended its theatrical run in North America on July 6, 2006, after 15 weeks (105 days) of release. It grossed $88,513,495 in the United States and Canada, ranking as Lee's highest-grossing film, ahead of Malcolm X (1992), which had ended its North American release with over $48 million.

Inside Man was released overseas on March 23, 2006. On its opening weekend, it grossed about $9,600,000 in ten territories. The film grossed $95,862,759 in the overseas box office, with a worldwide total of $184,376,254. In North America, it was the 22nd highest-grossing film of 2006, while it ranked the 21st highest-grossing film released worldwide.

=== Critical response ===
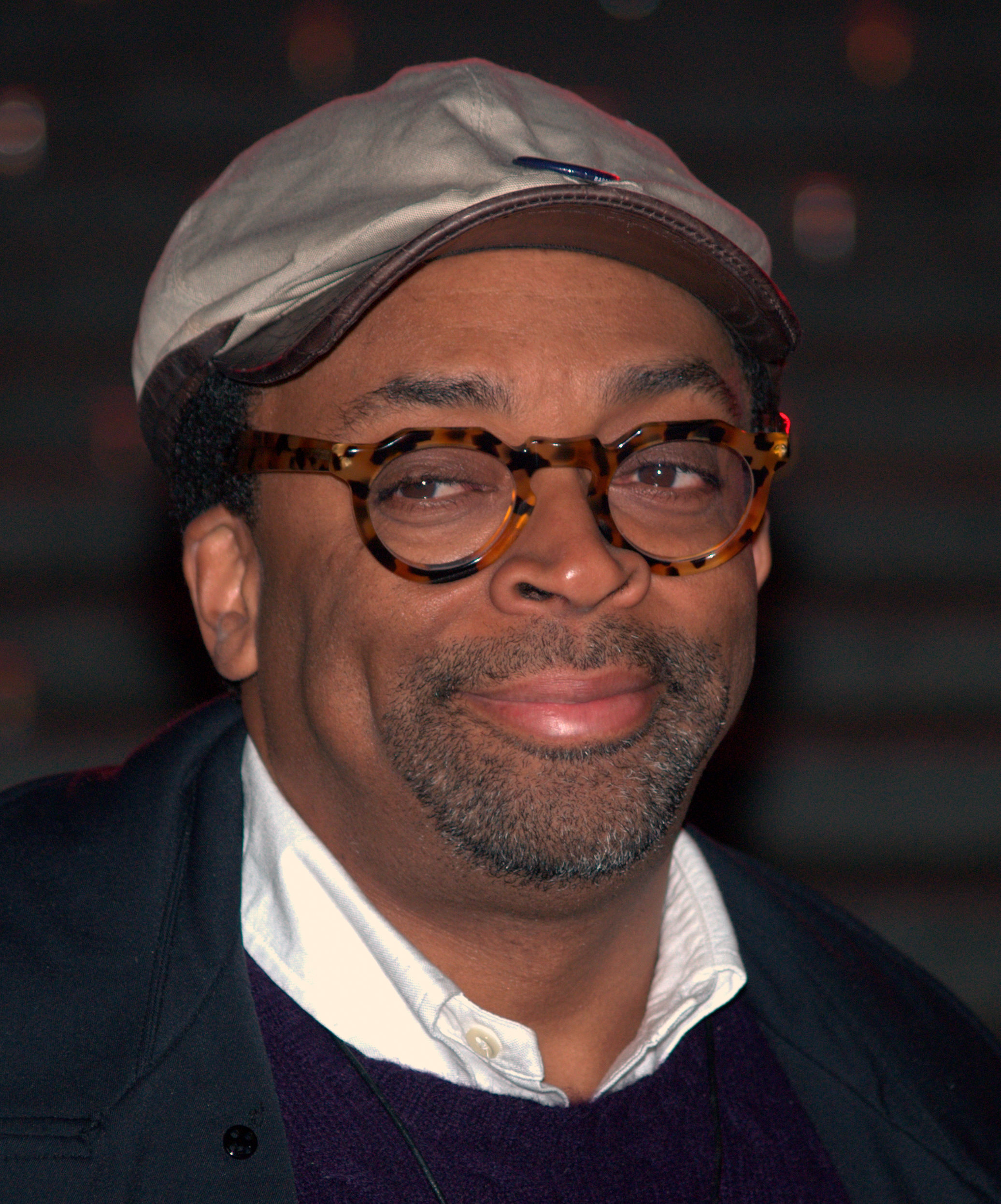
Critics praised Spike Lee for eschewing his usual style and delivering a straightforward thriller.

On review aggregator Rotten Tomatoes, the film holds an approval rating of 86% based on 210 reviews and an average rating of 7.3/10. The site's critical consensus reads, "Spike Lee's energetic and clever bank-heist thriller is a smart genre film that is not only rewarding on its own terms, but manages to subvert its pulpy trappings with wit and skill – and Denzel Washington is terrific as a brilliant hostage negotiator." Metacritic, another review aggregator, assigned the film a weighted average score of 76 out of 100 based on 39 critics, considered to be "generally favorable" reviews. Audiences polled by CinemaScore gave the film an average grade of "B+" on an A+ to F scale, with exit polls showing that 54% of the audience was male, while 68% was at least 30 years old or older. The American Film Institute named Inside Man as one of the top ten films of 2006.

Manohla Dargis of The New York Times wrote "Inside Man works because it takes a familiar setup—in this case, a Wall Street bank heist that mutates into a hostage crisis—and twists it ever so slightly. A particularly solid screenplay helps here, as do stars who can actually act ... along with an excellent supporting cast and the best lineup of pusses and mugs outside The Sopranos." The Wall Street Journal wrote "Our willingness to go along with the film's flaws is a tribute to its strengths, and to a cast that includes Chiwetel Ejiofor and Willem Dafoe, plus scores of character actors in small but striking roles." Empire gave the film four stars out of five, concluding, "It's certainly a Spike Lee film, but no Spike Lee Joint. Still, he's delivered a pacy, vigorous and frequently masterful take on a well-worn genre. Thanks to some slick lens work and a cast on cracking form, Lee proves (perhaps above all to himself?) that playing it straight is not always a bad thing." Wesley Morris of The Boston Globe wrote, "The basic story is elemental, but because Lee and Gewirtz invest it with grit, comedy, and a ton of New York ethnic personality, it's fresh anyway." David Ansen of Newsweek commented, "As unexpected as some of its plot twists is the fact that this unapologetic genre movie was directed by Spike Lee, who has never sold himself as Mr. Entertainment. But here it is, a Spike Lee joint that's downright fun." Giving the film a B+ rating, Lisa Schwarzbaum of Entertainment Weekly described the film as "a hybrid of studio action pic and Spike Lee joint. Or else it's a cross between a 2006 Spike Lee joint and a 1970s-style movie indictment of urban unease."

Roger Ebert of the Chicago Sun-Times criticized the narrative, writing, "Here is a thriller that's curiously reluctant to get to the payoff, and when it does, we see why: we can't accept the motive and method of the bank robbery, we can't believe in one character and can't understand another." Peter Bradshaw of The Guardian called it a "supremely annoying and nonsensical film". Rex Reed of The New York Observer wrote, "Inside Man has two things going for it: better actors than usual and a slicker look. Otherwise, it's no different from nine out of 10 other preposterous, contrived, confusingly written, unevenly directed, pointless and forgettable junk films we've been getting these days."

== Sequel ==
In November 2006, it was announced that a sequel to Inside Man was in development, with Russell Gewirtz reprising screenwriting duties. Under the working title Inside Man 2, the film would have Brian Grazer again serve as producer. Spike Lee was in negotiations to reprise his directing duties while serving as an executive producer alongside returning member Daniel M. Rosenberg. In 2008, Terry George was in negotiations to write the screenplay for the sequel; he later replaced Gewirtz, whose screenplay was abandoned. The plot for the sequel was intended to continue after the events of the first film, with Dalton Russell (played by Clive Owen) masterminding another robbery, and again matching wits with NYPD hostage negotiator Keith Frazier (Denzel Washington). Lee confirmed that Washington, Owen, Jodie Foster and Chiwetel Ejiofor would all reprise their roles. He also expressed interest in filming Inside Man 2 during the fall of 2009.

In 2011, it was announced that plans to make Inside Man 2 had been cancelled. Lee confirmed this, expressing that he could not secure funding for the project. "Inside Man was my most successful film, but we can't get the sequel made," he said. "And one thing Hollywood does well is sequels. The film's not getting made. We tried many times. It's not going to happen."

In 2019, a sequel titled Inside Man: Most Wanted was released direct-to-video and streaming on Netflix.
