= Capone (2020 film) =

2020 American film by Josh Trank

- Promotional release poster
- Directed by: Josh Trank
- Written by: Josh Trank
- Produced by: Russell Ackerman; John Schoenfelder; Lawrence Bender; Aaron L. Gilbert
- Starring: Tom Hardy; Linda Cardellini; Jack Lowden; Noel Fisher; Kyle MacLachlan; Matt Dillon
- Cinematography: Peter Deming
- Edited by: Josh Trank
- Music by: El-P
- Production companies: Endeavor Content; Lawrence Bender Productions; Bron Studios; Addictive Pictures; AI Film Entertainment; Creative Wealth Media
- Distributed by: Vertical Entertainment; Redbox Entertainment
- Release date: May 12, 2020
- Running time: 104 minutes
- Country: United States
- Language: English
- Budget: $20.6 million
- Box office: $858,281

Capone is a 2020 American biographical drama film written, directed and edited by Josh Trank, with Tom Hardy starring as the eponymous gangster Al Capone. The film centers on Capone after his 11-year sentence at Atlanta Penitentiary, as he has neurosyphilis and dementia while living in Florida. Linda Cardellini, Jack Lowden, Noel Fisher, Kyle MacLachlan, and Matt Dillon also star in supporting roles. First announced in October 2016 as Fonzo, production on the film did not begin until March 2018, lasting through May in Louisiana.

Originally intended to have a theatrical release, Capone was released through Premium VOD by Vertical Entertainment and Redbox Entertainment on May 12, 2020, due to the COVID-19 pandemic. The film received mixed reviews from critics, with Hardy's performance earning some praise while Trank's script and the film's tone were criticized.

== Plot ==
On Thanksgiving 1945, Alphonse Capone, the notorious mob boss of Prohibition-era Chicago, lives at his Florida estate with his wife Mae after being paroled from prison due to the effects of neurosyphilis and a stroke. He continues to decline physically and mentally, and is troubled by thoughts of an illegitimate son who rarely calls.

Mae struggles to pay the family's expenses by selling luxury items from the estate, as federal investigators monitor them constantly. Capone's physician, Dr. Karlock, advises Mae to keep his surroundings familiar by finding a way not to have to move. Johnny, an acquaintance from Chicago, visits and takes Capone fishing. During the outing Capone tells Johnny that he hid $10 million and can't remember where. Later, as Capone is talking to Johnny on his terrace, he tells Mae to bring Johnny a drink. Mae tells him that no one is there, leading to a brief fight and a check-in from Gino, who heads Capone's security detail.

Later that night Capone does not recognize Mae and tells the police that he has been kidnapped. He sees a young boy with a newsie cap and gold balloon walk past and follows the boy through a series of dreams about his Chicago years. These include singing a duet with Louis Armstrong, watching Gino stab a traitor to death, being seduced by a woman who offers clues about the treasure, and finally crawling over the bodies of shootout victims. Mae finds him on the floor paralyzed from another stroke.

Karlock meets with his federal contacts and asks for more time to get information. At the estate, he explains Capone's condition to Mae, Capone's brother Ralph and his son Alphonse Junior. During motor rehabilitation therapy Karlock asks Capone to draw a picture of a bag of money. Junior examines Capone's drawings and finds one of the boy with the balloon, which Capone says is his son Tony. As Capone continues drawing later, Ralph urges him to share any secrets he's keeping before he dies. At dinner Capone is upset by the sight of Gino cutting meat, which reminds him of his earlier dream. As Capone lies in bed afterward, Johnny appears and forgives Capone for killing him years ago, then cuts out his own eyes and offers them to help Capone find the treasure.

Desperate for a breakthrough, the federal agent overseeing the surveillance questions Capone. Capone stirs when asked about the money but says nothing. Angered, the agent threatens to monitor his family for the rest of their lives. Capone goes missing on the estate; a groundskeeper finds him with a gold-plated tommy gun. Gunfire sounds across the estate, and Capone is seen walking around with the gun, shooting Gino and anyone else in sight. Remembering the dream woman's clues, he dives into his lily pond, which swells into a wave and washes him into a picturesque Italian farm scene. He sees the gold balloon rise into the sky and the boy smiles down at him. Gino and the family find him lying on the floor and the groundskeeper nearby with a shot-out knee. As the groundskeeper is taken away in a wheelchair he sees movers take Capone's favorite statue.

The following Thanksgiving, the extended family joins Capone again for dinner. In the evening Mae brings Tony to sit beside him on the terrace. Tony holds Capone's hand, and Capone opens his eyes in astonishment.

== Cast ==
- Tom Hardy as Al Capone, referred to as "Fonse/Fonz"
- Linda Cardellini as Mae Capone
- Matt Dillon as Johnny
- Al Sapienza as Ralph Capone
- Kathrine Narducci as Rosie
- Noel Fisher as Junior
- Gino Cafarelli as Gino
- Mason Guccione as Tony
- Caiden Acurio as Vince
- Jack Lowden as Stirling H. Crawford, Agent FBI
- Kyle MacLachlan as Dr. Karlock
- Josh Trank as Agent Clifford M. Harris
- Neal Brennan as Harold Mattingly
- Edgar Arreola as Rodrigo
- Manuel Fajardo Jr. as Zambini

== Production ==
It was announced in October 2016 that Tom Hardy would star as Al Capone in the film, then known as Fonzo, which would be directed, written and edited by Josh Trank. Filming was initially to begin in the summer of 2017, with Hardy stating it would be released sometime in 2018. Hardy instead ended up filming the Sony's Spider-Man Universe (SSU) film Venom (2018) in 2017 and in March 2018 announced Fonzo as his next project. Later that month, Linda Cardellini, Matt Dillon, Kyle MacLachlan, Kathrine Narducci, Jack Lowden, Noel Fisher and Tilda Del Toro joined the cast.

Filming began on March 19, 2018 in New Orleans and lasted through May 15.

On April 15, 2020, the trailer was released with its new title, Capone.

Rapper and producer El-P composed the score for the film, which was released by Milan Records.

== Release ==
On May 12, 2020 Vertical Entertainment and Redbox Entertainment released the film digitally in the United States and Canada through Premium video on demand. The film was originally set to have a theatrical release, but these plans changed due to movie theater closures that started in mid-March because of the COVID-19 pandemic restrictions. The film received a theatrical release in several regions such as Iceland, Lithuania, Portugal, Ukraine, Russia, and South Korea, where it grossed $858,281.

== Reception ==
=== VOD sales ===
In its first few days of release, Capone was the number-two rented film on iTunes. Over its first weekend, it ranked third on iTunes and fourth on both FandangoNow and Google Play. Over its first ten days the film made $2.5 million from digital sales, a record for Vertical Entertainment. IndieWire called the results "quite good" but "far from being a money-[maker]", saying that Vertical would see about 75% of the initial gross ($1.5 million), and that the film could leg out to $4–5 million in sales. In its second weekend of release the film fell to 11th on iTunes and seventh on Fandango. The weekend of August 7, upon lowering the price to $0.99, the film was the second-most rented on the iTunes Store and Apple TV.

=== Critical response ===
On Rotten Tomatoes, the film holds an approval rating of 40% based on 140 reviews, with an average rating of 4.8/10. The website's consensus reads: "Tom Hardy makes the most of his opportunity to tackle a challenging role, but Capone is too haphazardly constructed to support his fascinating performance." On Metacritic, the film has a weighted average score of 46 out of 100, based on 37 critics, indicating "mixed or average" reviews.

Writing for TheWrap, Steve Pond said: "It's nuts, it's a mess and it's pretty damn entertaining if you don't mind characters pooping the bed and getting stabbed in the neck", saying that "Tom Hardy laughs in the face of conventional notions of good v. bad acting." Scout Tafoya writing for Consequence of Sound gave the film an A− grade and noted that "Somehow, Trank had energy left over, despite wrangling one of the most eccentric performers working, to make a satisfying haunted house film as well" and called it "one of the most bravely singular and uncommon films you'll see this year."

Owen Gleiberman of Variety called the film "the last half hour of The Irishman crossed with the doddering-legend parts of Citizen Kane" and said that Hardy gives "a mumbly Method showboat performance that's authentic on the surface, but there isn't enough beneath the mob mannerisms." David Ehrlich of IndieWire gave the film a "C−" grade and wrote: "Nevertheless, the director and his subject are ultimately buried together in the same boat: We're made to understand their suffering, but given no reason to root for their salvation."

The film was nominated for Worst Film of the Year by the Hawaii Film Critics Society, but lost to Wonder Woman 1984.
