= Kathrine Narducci =

American actress

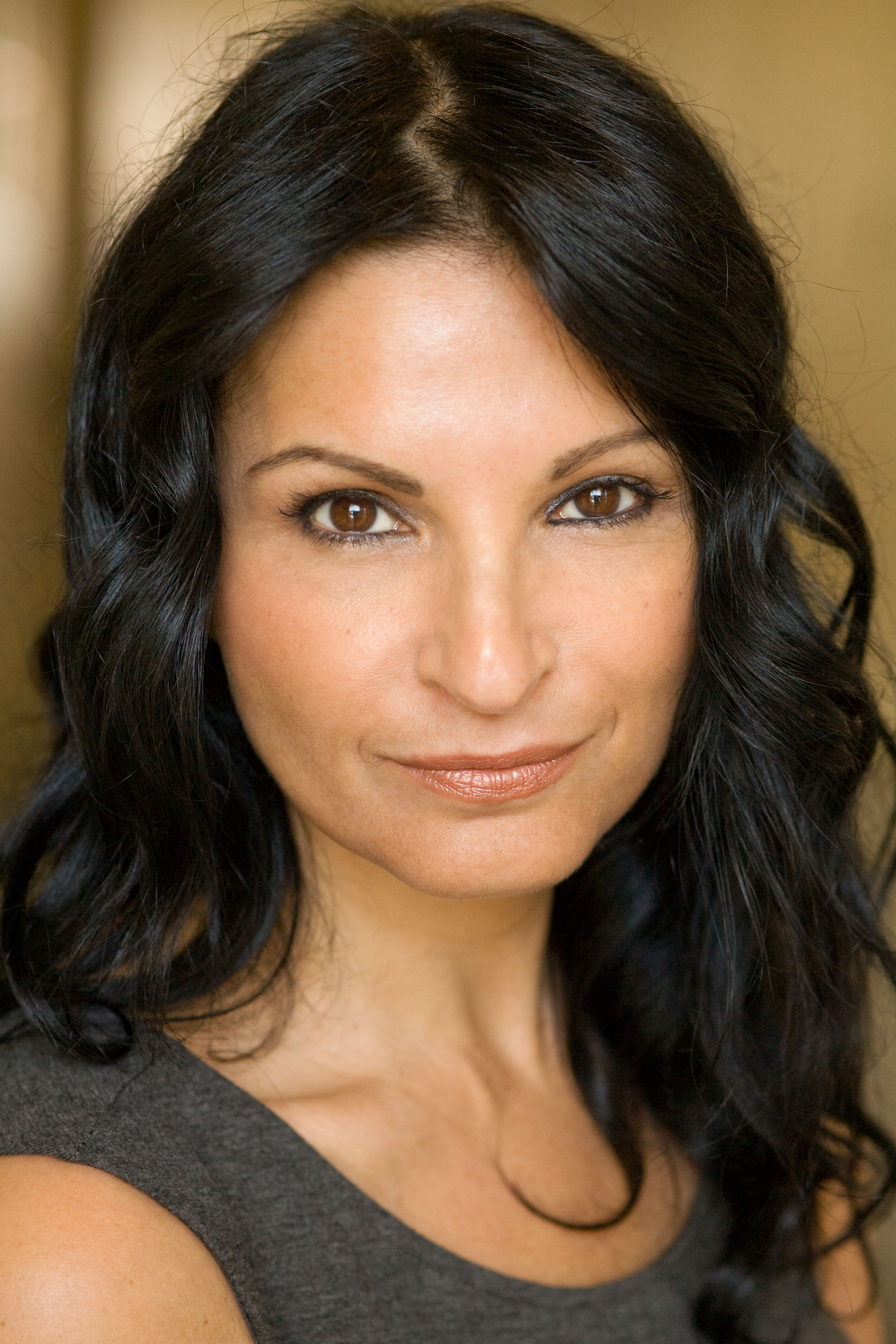
- Born: New York City, U.S.
- Occupation: Actress
- Years active: 1993–present

Kathrine Narducci (Italian pronunciation: [narˈduttʃi]) is an American actress, known for her role as Charmaine Bucco, Artie Bucco's wife, on the HBO crime drama series The Sopranos (1999–2007). Her film credits include A Bronx Tale (1993), Chicago Overcoat (2009), Jersey Boys (2014), Bad Education (2019), The Irishman (2019), and Capone (2020).

== Early life ==
Kathrine Narducci was born to an Italian-American family in Italian Harlem, New York City. Her father, Nicky Narducci, a bar owner and local figure in the Mafia in East Harlem, was killed in a mob-related hit in front of his bar when Kathrine was ten years old.

== Career ==
Narducci's acting career began in 1993 when she brought her 9-year-old son to an open casting call for the role of a 9-year-old boy in A Bronx Tale. While auditioning her son, Narducci successfully auditioned for the role of the film protagonist's mother. In following years, she made multiple guest appearances in television shows, including Law & Order, Law & Order: Special Victims Unit, NYPD Blue, Third Watch, and Blue Bloods. In 1999, she was cast as Charmaine Bucco, Artie Bucco's wife, on the HBO crime drama series The Sopranos, a role she played until series finale in 2007.

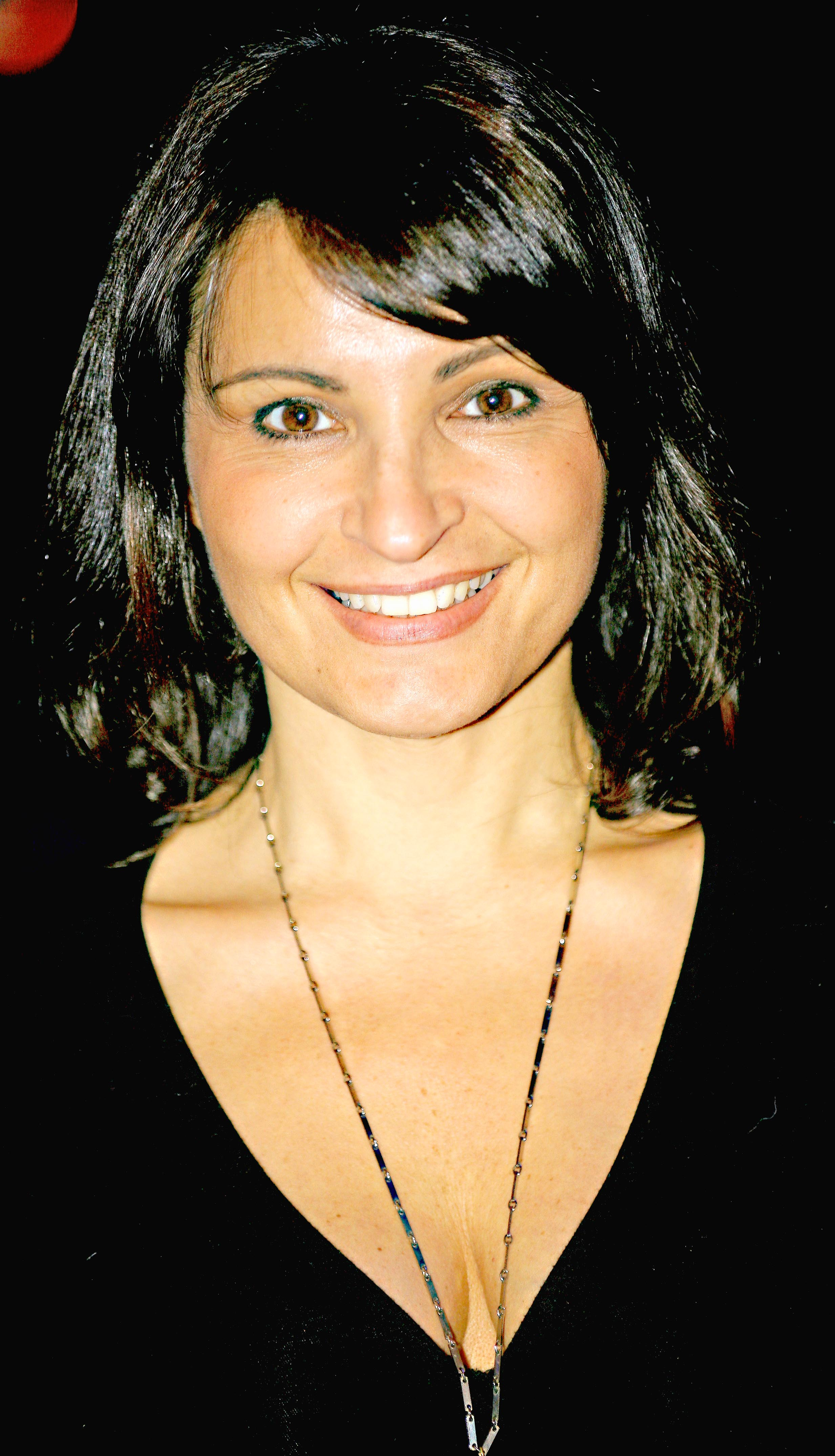
Narducci in 2007

In 2009, she starred in the gangster film Chicago Overcoat. In 2014, she played a supporting role in Clint Eastwood's Jersey Boys. Also that year, she was regular cast member in the Starz crime series Power. The following years, she had supporting roles in films The Wizard of Lies (2017), Bad Education (2019), The Irishman (2019), and Capone (2020). In 2019, she began a recurring role in the Epix series Godfather of Harlem. In 2022, Narducci was cast as Anna Genovese, the second wife of mobster Vito Genovese, in the film The Alto Knights directed by Barry Levinson.

== Filmography ==
=== Film ===
Year	Title	Role	Notes
1993	A Bronx Tale	Rosina Anello	
1994	Miracle on 34th Street	Mother	
1998	Cuisine américaine	Bridget	
1998	Pishadoo	Felicia	Short
1999	A Whole New Day	Carol	Short
2000	Two Family House	Estelle Visalo	
2007	Slice	Marie Leone	Short
2007	Made in Brooklyn	Anna Sciacca	
2009	Blue	Brenda Marshall	
2009	The Deported	Cynthia	
2009	Chicago Overcoat	Lorraine Lionello	
2010	Ink	Luna	Short
2010	Group Sex	Frannie	Video
2011	The Last Gamble	Kathrine	
2012	To Redemption	Joanne Reed	
2014	Jersey Boys	Mary Rinaldi	
2014	Zarra's Law	Laura	
2016	Blue: The American Dream	Brenda Marshall	
2017	Lost Cat Corona	Nora	
2017	Toute La Vie	Henri	Short
2017	Bricklayer's Poet	Luna	Short
2018	Cruise	Mama Fortunato	
2018	First We Take Brooklyn	Gale	
2018	American Dresser	Mary	
2019	79 Parts: Director's Cut	Aunt Josefina	
2019	Bad Education	Sharon Katz	
2019	The Irishman	Carrie Bufalino	
2020	Capone	Rosie	
2020	Two Ways to Go West	Faith	
2021	Love is Love	Sam	Short
2022	69 Parts	Aunt	
2025	The Alto Knights	Anna Genovese	

=== Television ===
Year	Title	Role	Notes
1994	Law & Order	Louisa D'Angelo	Episode: "Mayhem"
1995	NYPD Blue	Angela Biaggi	Episode: "One Big Happy Family"
1997	Law & Order	Mrs. Marsh	Episode: "Menace"
1997	Dellaventura	Celeste Roberti	Episode: "With a Vengeance"
1998	Law & Order	Vicky Grant	Episode: "Faccia a Faccia"
1998	Witness to the Mob	Linda Milito	TV film
1999–2002	Third Watch	Jayme Mankowicz	Recurring cast (season 1), guest (season 3)
1999–2007	The Sopranos	Charmaine Bucco	Recurring cast (season 1 & 3–6), guest (season 2)
2004	NYPD Blue	Ann Marie Fusco	Episode: "Peeler? I Hardly Knew Her"
2004	Wild Card	Maria Antonello	Episode: "Bada Bing, Bada Busiek"
2005	Without a Trace	Nurse	Episode: "4.0"
2006	Cold Case	Brenda	Episode: "The War at Home"
2007	Top Chef	Herself	Episode: "Seven"
2008	In Plain Sight	Felicia Santoro/Felicia Amato	Episode: "Pilot"
2008	Law & Order: Special Victims Unit	Adrianna Vidal	Episode: "Babes"
2011	Workaholics	Maria	Recurring cast (season 2)
2011	Hung	Bernice	Episode: "A Monkey Named Simian or Frances Is Not a Fan"
2012	Celebrity Ghost Stories	Herself	Episode: "Billy Dee Williams/Jenna Morasca/Dee Wallace/Kathrine Narducci"
2014–15	Power	Frankie Lavarro	Main cast (season 1), guest (season 2)
2015	Blue Bloods	Anna Bianco	Episode: "Love Stories"
2016	Major Crimes	Kate Kotero	Episode: "Cashed Out"
2017	The Wizard of Lies	Eleanor Squillari	TV film
2019–25	Godfather of Harlem	Olympia Gigante	Recurring cast
2022	Euphoria	Grandma	Episode: "Trying to Get to Heaven Before They Close the Door"
2025	69 Parts	Aunt	
2025	Poker Face	Mrs. Hoppenstammer	Episode: "Last Looks"
