= Chicago Overcoat =

- Directed by: Brian Caunter
- Written by: Josh Staman; Andrew Alex Dowd; John W. Bosher; Brian Caunter
- Produced by: John W. Bosher
- Starring: Frank Vincent; Kathrine Narducci; Mike Starr; Stacy Keach; Armand Assante
- Cinematography: Kevin Moss
- Edited by: James Wentworth
- Music by: Greg Nicolett
- Production company: Beverly Ridge Pictures
- Distributed by: Artist View Entertainment
- Release date: October 10, 2009 (Chicago)
- Running time: 94 minutes
- Country: United States
- Language: English
- Budget: $2 million

Chicago Overcoat is a 2009 American gangster film. The script was written by Brian Caunter, John W. Bosher, Josh Staman, and Andrew Alex Dowd; Caunter also directed. The production filmed in Chicago and wrapped principal photography November 29, 2007. Chicago Overcoat had its world premiere at the 45th Chicago International Film Festival on Saturday, October 10, 2009, with three sold out screenings and was brought back for an encore screening after being voted into the "Best of the Fest". The film went on to win "Best Dramatic Feature" at the 8th Garden State Film Festival, and "Best Cinematography" at the 7th Midwest Independent Film Festival.

"Chicago Overcoat" is a Prohibition era slang term meaning "coffin" or cement shoes.

== Plot ==
The story takes place in modern-day Chicago. Lou Marazano was once a feared hit man, but his reputation has dimmed significantly twenty years after his retirement. Unable to help his daughter financially after her ex-husband fails to pay child support, he asks the current local mob boss, Lorenzo Galante, for work. Though reluctant to give him the job, Galante sends him to kill several witnesses who will testify against D'Agostino, the previous mob boss. After Marazano sends flowers to the widow of one of the men he kills, Ralph Maloney, a veteran cop, reopens a case that involved a string of murders from the early 1990s. Though discouraged from investigating, Maloney and his partner Elliot Walsh stake out the second target. Picked up at the scene of the crime, Marazano does not talk, and the police are forced to set him free when his girlfriend and her neighbors provide an alibi.

Worried that Marazano may talk in order to avoid jail time, Galante orders him killed. Marazano stays a step ahead of his former friends and is able to kill the crew sent to assassinate him. Knowing that he must also kill Galante, Marazano heads to Galante's bar, where Galante threatens Marazano's family. Unmoved by the threats, Marazano kills Galante and offers his gold watch to an elderly man. When the elderly man is taken in by the police as a potential witness, they spot the distinctive watch and realize that they have enough evidence to arrest Marazano. Meanwhile, Marazano collects the money from his job and receives his final target: the police captain. Meanwhile, Walsh takes over the investigation once Maloney became frustrated with the department's red tape. At his daughter's house, Marazano gives her all the money and urges her to leave the city, which he also plans to do.

When their captain says that he has important information to share, Walsh and Maloney, who has returned to active duty despite his cynicism, meet him in private at a parking garage. Unknown to the others, Marazano tails the cops. Revealing that he is corrupt, the captain shoots both his subordinates. Before the captain can finish off either man, Marazano kills him. As Marazano turns to leave, a wounded Maloney and Walsh (who had survived thanks to his bullet-proof vest) attempt to stop him. In the ensuing gunfight, Maloney's blurred eyesight from a head-wound causes him to shoot and accidentally kill Walsh. Enraged, he chases after Marazano, whom he blames for Walsh's death. When Maloney catches up to Marazano and confronts him, Marazano draws a hidden pistol and kills him, then walks off into the rainy night.

== Cast ==
- Frank Vincent as Lou Marazano
- Kathrine Narducci as Lorraine Lionello
- Mike Starr as Lorenzo Galante
- Stacy Keach as Ray Berkowski
- Armand Assante as Stefano D'Agostino
- Danny Goldring as Ralph Maloney
- Tim Gamble as Harold Greene
- Martin Shannon as Sammy Delano
- Barret Walz as Elliot Walsh
- Gina D'Ercoli as Angela Casso
- Robert Gerdisch as Michael Casso
- Rick Plastina as Angelo Perelli
- Mark Vallarta as Joey Casso
- Jack Bronis as Joe Barbone
- Michael Guido as Frank Salerno
- Ray Toler as Philip Rossi
- Ulises Acosta as Rodrigo

== Reception ==
Alissa Simon of Variety wrote that the film "musters mob-film cliches with verve". Reece Pendleton of the Chicago Reader wrote, "Despite the stock characters and well-trod material, this is an engaging tale, enhanced considerably by Vincent's perfect mix of vulnerability and steely resolve." Bill Gibron of DVD Verdict called it "a nicely nuanced crime story".
