= Goddess Wheel =

- Cast album cover
- Music: Galt MacDermot
- Lyrics: Matty Selman
- Book: Matty Selman

Goddess Wheel is a musical adaptation of Lysistrata by Aristophanes. The show contains music by Hair composer Galt MacDermot and lyrics/book by Matty Selman. The first presentations of the musical starred Tony Award winner Cherry Jones at Harvard's American Repertory Theater and Prince Music Theater in Philadelphia. In 2005, Collaborative Arts Project 21 (CAP21) further developed the musical and presented it from November 30–December 10.

The musical premiered as part of the 2011–2012 theater season at Wagner College. The show's premiere run was joined by Galt's own band, The New Pulse Jazz Band. The run was scheduled for April 18–29, 2012, at the Music Hall of Snug Harbor Cultural Center in Staten Island.
