= Righteous Kill =

2008 American thriller film

- Theatrical release poster
- Directed by: Jon Avnet
- Written by: Russell Gewirtz
- Produced by: Avi Lerner; Boaz Davidson; Daniel M. Rosenberg; Lati Grobman; Randall Emmett; Rob Cowan; Alexandra Milchan
- Starring: Robert De Niro; Al Pacino; Curtis Jackson; Carla Gugino; Donnie Wahlberg; Trilby Glover; Brian Dennehy; John Leguizamo
- Cinematography: Denis Lenoir
- Edited by: Paul Hirsch
- Music by: Ed Shearmur
- Production companies: Grosvenor Park Productions; Emmett/Furla Films; Millennium Films
- Distributed by: Overture Films
- Release date: September 12, 2008
- Running time: 101 minutes
- Country: United States
- Language: English
- Budget: $60 million
- Box office: $79.4 million

Righteous Kill is a 2008 American crime thriller film directed by Jon Avnet and written by Russell Gewirtz. The film stars Robert De Niro and Al Pacino as New York City Police Department detectives on the hunt for a serial killer who hunts and kills criminals who evaded justice, and is known by the moniker "Poet". It is the third film in which both De Niro and Pacino appear in starring roles (after The Godfather Part II and Heat), and also stars John Leguizamo, Carla Gugino, Donnie Wahlberg, Brian Dennehy and Curtis Jackson.

Righteous Kill was released in the United States on September 12, 2008. The film received negative reviews from critics and grossed $79.4 million against a $60 million budget.

== Plot ==
Police psychologists are reviewing video recordings in which Detective David Fisk, a.k.a. "Turk" discusses how much he admires his partner of almost 30 years, Detective Tom Cowan, a.k.a. "Rooster".

Forward to Fisk and Cowan investigating the murder of a pimp named Robert "Rambo" Brady. Less experienced detectives Karen Corelli, Simon Perez and Ted Riley are also on the case. When they find a poem on the body, the cops deduce it is the tenth victim of a serial killer called The Poetry Boy for his modus operandi of murdering criminals and leaving short poems with their bodies.

Other victims of Poetry Boy then include acquitted rapist Jonathan Van Luytens, and a Catholic priest named Father Connell, a child molester whose victims we learn included Poetry Boy.

Tension arises among the detectives when Cowan starts living with Perez's ex-girlfriend, Corelli.

Russian mobster Yevgeny Magulat then survives an assault by Poetry Boy, shoots at Perez's house and rapes Corelli.

Suspecting Cowan of being Poetry Boy due to his marksmanship skills and troubling psych evaluations, Perez and Riley arrange to secretly observe a meeting between Cowan and suspected drug dealer Marcus "Spider" Smith. Expecting Cowan to reveal his homicidal tendencies, he's instead proven innocent by having a firearm inconsistent with Poetry Boy's, and reciting a humiliating poem that is also inconsistent with the killer's style. Perez and Riley leave the scene unsatisfied. Fisk then kills Spider, but drops what appears to be his journal during their confrontation.

Cowan discovers the journal, in which Fisk predicted Spider would be Poetry Boy's fourteenth victim. Cowan puts Fisk in front of a video camera and forces him to read it, revealing to the public that "Rooster" is David Fisk/Poetry Boy, while "Turk" is actually Tom Cowan. The video is the one from the beginning. Rooster admits losing his faith in the justice system when Turk, whom he admired, planted evidence to incriminate a man previously acquitted on charges of child molestation and murder named Charles Randall. The injustice turned Rooster into a vigilante serial killer of 14 people.

"Turk" Cowan chases "Rooster" Fisk to a construction site, then tries to resist Fisk's attempts to goad him into killing him, but is forced to shoot him. Rooster begs Turk to let him die, and Turk calls off the paramedics, allowing Rooster to succumb to his wounds.

Fast-forward to the Police's Internal Affairs Bureau watching what is in effect Rooster "Fisk"’s video confession, closing the case and allowing Cowan to walk free.

Cowan becomes the coach of a youth girls' baseball team, and Corelli cheers from the bleachers.

== Cast ==
- Robert De Niro as Detective Tom Cowan
- Al Pacino as Detective David Fisk
- Curtis Jackson as Marcus "Spider" Smith
- Carla Gugino as Detective Karen Corelli
- Donnie Wahlberg as Detective Teddy Riley
- Trilby Glover as Jessica
- Shirly Brener as Natalya
- Melissa Leo as Cheryl Brooks
- Oleg Taktarov as Yevgeny Mugalat
- Alan Rosenberg as Internal Affairs Detective Stein
- Sterling K. Brown as Internal Affairs Detective Rogers
- Alan Blumenfeld as Martin Baum
- Rob Dyrdek as Robert "Rambo" Brady
- Brian Dennehy as Lieutenant J.D. Hingis
- John Leguizamo as Detective Simon Perez
- Saidah Arrika Ekulona as Assistant District Attorney Gwen Darvis
- Barry Primus as Dr. Prosky
- Adrian Martinez as Glenn (uncredited)
- Jim Jones: Cameo (uncredited)

== Production ==
In May 2007, it was reported that Robert De Niro and Al Pacino would star in Righteous Kill, a thriller written by Russell Gewirtz and directed by Jon Avnet from Emmett/Furla Oasis and Millennium Media that would follow two cops investigating a serial killer. According to executive producer Randall Emmett, the film came about from De Niro and Pacino's desire to work together, with the idea for the film to be built around them. The film garnered significant interest for the pairing of De Niro and Pacino after the two had shared only one scene in Heat and had shared no scenes in The Godfather Part II. In September 2007, Brian Dennehy, John Leguizamo, Trilby Glover and Rob Dyrdek joined the cast.

== Reception ==
=== Box office ===
Righteous Kill grossed $40.1 million in the United States and Canada, and $39.4 million in other territories, for a worldwide total of $79.4 million.

In its opening weekend, Righteous Kill opened at #3, grossing $16.3 million, behind new releases Burn After Reading and The Family That Preys. Overture Films paid $12 million to acquire the rights to the film, and stated that they would be happy if it could theatrically gross $25 million in the United States. By comparison, Heat, which starred Pacino and De Niro in 1995, grossed over $180 million worldwide.

=== Critical response ===
On the review aggregator website Rotten Tomatoes, 18% of 146 critics' reviews are positive, with an average rating of 4.2/10. The website's consensus reads: "Al Pacino and Robert De Niro do their best to elevate this dowdy genre exercise, but even these two greats can't resuscitate the film's hackneyed script." Metacritic, which uses a weighted average, assigned the film a score of 36 out of 100, based on 27 critics, indicating "generally unfavorable" reviews.

The Times included Righteous Kill on its 100 Worst Films of 2008 list.

Keith Phipps of The Onion's A.V. Club said, "The novelty of watching De Niro and Pacino team up wears off pretty quickly, [with them] trudging through a thriller that would have felt warmed over in 1988. Director Jon Avnet doesn't offer much compensation for the absent suspense."

James Berardinelli of ReelViews gave the film two stars out of four, saying, "This isn't just generic material; it's generic material with a dumb ending, and the director is a journeyman, not a craftsman. ... Its failure to live up to even modest expectations is a blow. There's nothing righteous to be found here."

Ken Fox of TV Guide also gave Righteous Kill a score of two stars out of four, saying, "The entire movie is one big build-up to a twist that, while not exactly cheating, plays an awfully cheap trick. To get there, writer Russel Gewirtz and director John Avnet sacrifice mystery, suspense, sensible editing and everything else one expects to find in a police thriller just to keep the audience off-guard. It's not worth it, and the first real pairing of De Niro and Pacino [since 1995’s Heat] is utterly wasted."

Claudia Puig of USA Today gave the film one-and-a-half stars out of four, saying, "By the time the movie reaches its protracted conclusion, it feels like a slog. Pacino has a few funny lines, as does Leguizamo, but not nearly enough to save the film from collapsing under the weight of its own self-righteous tedium."

Peter Travers of Rolling Stone gave Righteous Kill one star out of four, saying, "Some people think Robert De Niro and Al Pacino would be a kick to watch just reading a phone book. Well, bring on that phone book. Righteous Kill, a.k.a. The Al and Bob Show, is a cop flick with all the drama of Law & Order: AARP."

However, Tim Evans for Sky Movies remarked that the film was "... an effective whodunnit but—more importantly—it poses refined, complex questions about how the law operates in a so-called civilised society."

Al Pacino earned a Razzie Award nomination for Worst Actor for his performance in the film (and for 88 Minutes, also directed by Jon Avnet), but lost the award to Mike Myers for The Love Guru.

== Home media ==
The film was released on DVD and Blu-ray on January 6, 2009. As of February 2009, 778,760 DVD units had been sold, gathering $16.9 million in revenue.

== See also ==
- List of American films of 2008
