= Matty Selman =

- Occupations: Composer, Lyricist, Playwright, Author

Matty Selman is a playwright, lyricist, composer, and author based in New York City. He first came into the national spotlight when he was hand-selected by Harvard's Robert Brustein to write the lyrics to an adaptation of Lysistrata with music by HAIR composer, Galt MacDermot. The resulting work starred Tony Award winner Cherry Jones and was presented by the American Repertory Theatre at Harvard and the Prince Theatre in Philadelphia.

== Early life and career ==
Both having lived on Staten Island, Selman and MacDermot continued their collaboration and wrote Goddess Wheel a further exploration of the Lysistrata tale, which had its world premiere at the Snug Harbor Cultural Center.

Prior to working with Galt MacDermot, Selman had collaborated with Agnes of God playwright, John Pielmeier on three musicals, Steeplechase the Funny Place, developed at The New Harmony Project, Young Rube, produced on the Main Stage of the Repertory Theatre of St. Louis, and Slow Dance with a Hot Pickup, produced at BDT in Boulder, Co.

He is the author of "Uncle Philip's Coat" which won Best Production at the United Solo Festival. It was recently produced at the Greenhouse Theatre in Chicago starring Gene Waygandt.

He is the composer, lyricist and librettist of "La Dottoressa" a new musical about feminist, scientist, educator, mother and advocate for world peace, Maria Montessori. "La Dottoressa" was presented as a full staged reading by the Chamber Orchestra Society at Lincoln Center and featured Kathy Voytko, Ned Eisenberg and Angelina Fiordellisi.

Matty was selected by the Cafe Royal Cultural Foundation as its Spring Literature Grantee,2021 for his collection of short stories, "Satchel of Dreams." He is the creator and sole author of "Time Out of Kilter" a monthly newsletter of his original stories. (mattyselman.substack.com)
