= Robert Siegel (filmmaker) =

American screenwriter and director (born 1971)

Robert D. Siegel
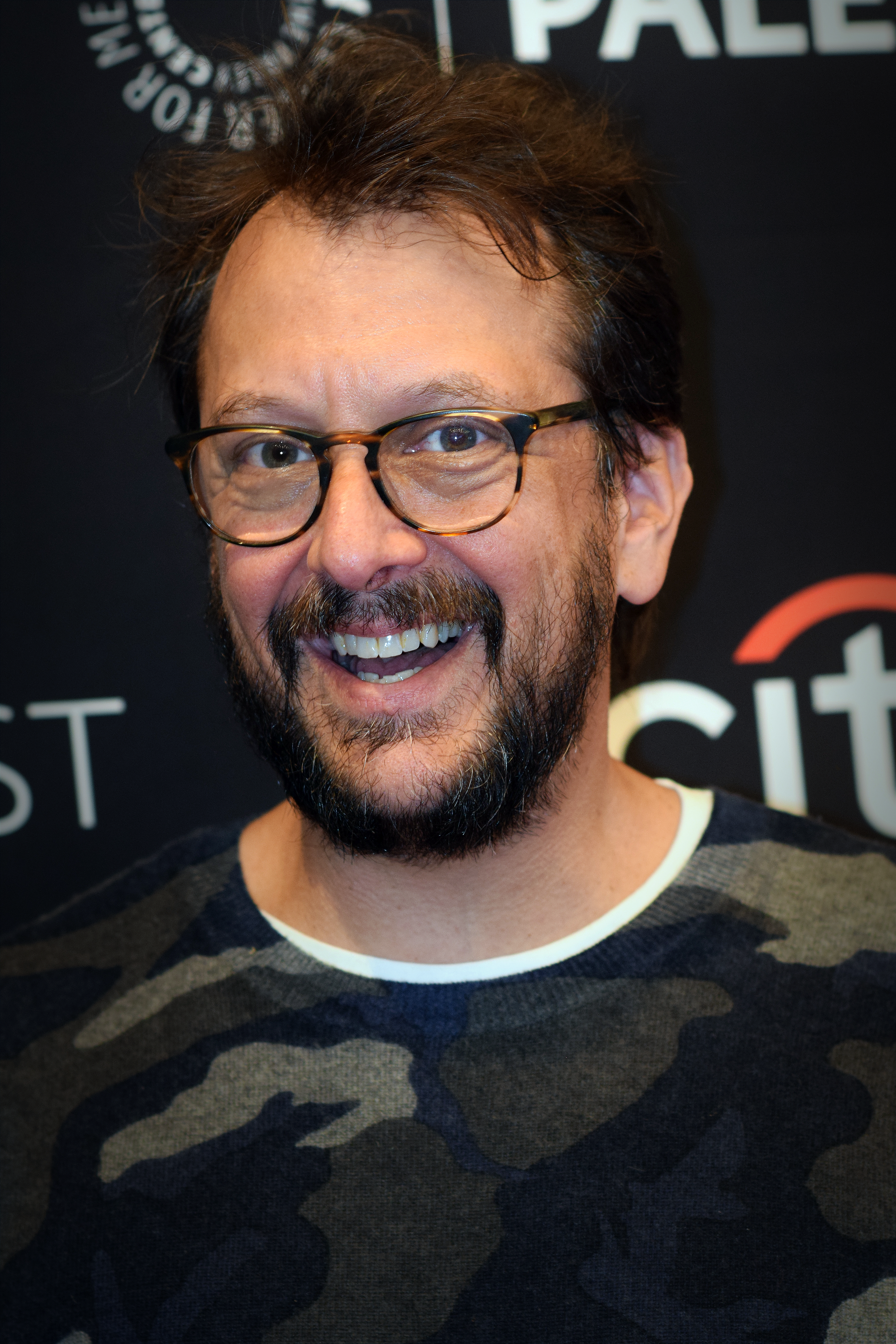
- Siegel in 2023
- Born: Robert D. Siegel; November 12, 1971 (age 54); Long Island, New York, U.S.
- Education: University of Michigan
- Occupations: Writer, film director
- Spouse: Jen Cohn
- Children: 1

Robert D. Siegel (born November 12, 1971) is an American writer and film director. He is most known for his work on The Wrestler and The Founder.

The Wrestler won the Golden Lion at the 2008 Venice Film Festival and earned several Best Picture nominations.

Big Fan premiered at the Sundance Film Festival in 2009. It was revealed in an online interview that Siegel attempted to write drafts for a comedy film but it ended up being a drama because of the conflicts in the film as well as avoiding Patton Oswalt being typecast as a comedic character. Big Fan was nominated for the John Cassavetes Award, which honors features made for under $500K, at the Independent Spirit Awards 2010.

Siegel is a graduate of the University of Michigan who later became senior editor of The Onion from 1996 to 1999, and editor-in-chief from 1999 to 2003.

He is married to voice actress Jen Cohn and has a son with her.

== Filmography ==
Film

Year	Title	Director	Writer
2008	The Onion Movie	No	Yes
2008	The Wrestler	No	Yes
2009	Big Fan	Yes	Yes
2013	Turbo	No	Yes
2016	The Founder	No	Yes
2018	Cruise	Yes	Yes

Television

Year	Title	Writer	Executive Producer	Creator
2022	Pam & Tommy	Yes	Yes	Yes
2022-2023	Welcome to Chippendales	Yes	Yes	Yes

Cameo Roles

Year	Title	Role
2008	The Wrestler	Autograph Fan #1
2009	Big Fan	Front-Lawn Reporter #1
