= Gotham Independent Film Awards 2006 =

Annual US film awards ceremony

16th Annual Gotham Independent Film Awards
- Date: November 29, 2006
- Country: United States
- Presented by: Independent Filmmaker Project
- Hosted by: David Cross

Highlights
- Most wins: Half Nelson (3)
- Most nominations: Half Nelson (3)
- Best Feature: Half Nelson
- Breakthrough Director: Ryan Fleck – Half Nelson
- Website: https://gotham.ifp.org

The 16th Annual Gotham Independent Film Awards, presented by the Independent Filmmaker Project, were held on November 29, 2006 and were hosted by David Cross. The nominees were announced on October 23, 2006.

== Winners and nominees ==
Best Feature: Half Nelson; The Departed; Little Children; Marie Antoinette; Old Joy	Best Documentary Feature: Iraq in Fragments; Deliver Us from Evil; Following Sean; An Inconvenient Truth; Jonestown: The Life and Death of Peoples Temple
Breakthrough Director: Ryan Fleck – Half Nelson; Ramin Bahrani – Man Push Cart; Laurie Collyer – Sherrybaby; So Yong Kim – In Between Days; James Marsh – The King	Breakthrough Actor: Shareeka Epps – Half Nelson as Drey (TIE); Rinko Kikuchi – Babel as Chieko Wataya (TIE); Abigail Breslin – Little Miss Sunshine as Olive Hoover; Melinda Page Hamilton – Sleeping Dogs Lie as Amy; Channing Tatum – A Guide to Recognizing Your Saints as Young Antonio
Best Ensemble Performance: Babel – Boubker Ait El Caid, Adriana Barraza, Gael García Bernal, Cate Blanchett, Rinko Kikuchi, Brad Pitt, Said Tarchani, and Kōji Yakusho; For Your Consideration – Bob Balaban, Jennifer Coolidge, Christopher Guest, John Michael Higgins, Eugene Levy, Jane Lynch, Michael McKean, Catherine O'Hara, Parker Posey, Harry Shearer, and Fred Willard; Little Miss Sunshine – Alan Arkin, Abigail Breslin, Steve Carell, Toni Collette, Paul Dano, and Greg Kinnear; A Prairie Home Companion – Woody Harrelson, Tommy Lee Jones, L. Q. Jones, Garrison Keillor, Kevin Kline, Lindsay Lohan, Virginia Madsen, John C. Reilly, Maya Rudolph, Tim Russell, Sue Scott, Meryl Streep, and Lily Tomlin; Shortbus – Raphael Barker, Lindsay Beamish, Jay Brannan, Justin Vivian Bond, Paul Dawson, PJ DeBoy, Sook-Yin Lee, and Peter Stickles	Best Film Not Playing at a Theater Near You: Choking Man; Colma: The Musical; In Between Days; The Great Happiness Space; Wristcutters: A Love Story

=== Gotham Tributes ===
- Alfonso Cuarón, Guillermo del Toro and Alejandro González Iñárritu
- Mark Cuban and Todd Wagner
- Edward Norton
- Tim Robbins
- Kate Winslet
