= Gotham Independent Film Award for Best Ensemble Cast =

Former annual US film award

- Country: United States
- Presented by: The Gotham Film & Media Institute
- First award: 2005
- Final award: 2012
- Website: awards.thegotham.org

The Gotham Independent Film Award for Best Ensemble Cast was one of the annual Gotham Independent Film Awards awarded between 2005 and 2012. The award was called Gotham Independent Film Award for Best Ensemble Performance between 2008 and 2012.

While this competitive award was retired in 2012, a non-competitive special award honoring one film's ensemble has been given at the Gotham Awards almost every year since 2014. From 2014 to 2018, it was presented as the Special Jury Award for Best Ensemble Performance, and since 2020, it has been presented under the name Ensemble Tribute.

== Winners and nominees ==
=== 2000s ===
Year	Film	Winners and nominees	Ref.
2005	The Squid and the Whale	William Baldwin, Jeff Daniels, Jesse Eisenberg, Owen Kline, Laura Linney, Anna Paquin	
2005	Brokeback Mountain	Linda Cardellini, Anna Faris, Jake Gyllenhaal, Anne Hathaway, Heath Ledger, Randy Quaid, Michelle Williams	
2005	Crash	Chris "Ludacris" Bridges, Sandra Bullock, Don Cheadle, Matt Dillon, Jennifer Esposito, William Fichtner, Brendan Fraser, Nona Gaye, Terrence Howard, Thandie Newton, Michael Peña, Ryan Phillippe, Larenz Tate	
2005	Good Night, and Good Luck	Patricia Clarkson, George Clooney, Jeff Daniels, Robert Downey Jr., Frank Langella, David Strathairn	
2005	Nine Lives	Kathy Baker, Amy Brenneman, Elpidia Carrillo, Glenn Close, Stephen Dillane, Dakota Fanning, William Fichtner, Lisa Gay Hamilton, Jason Isaacs, Joe Mantegna, Ian McShane, Molly Parker, Mary Kay Place, Sydney Tamiia Poitier, Aidan Quinn, Miguel Sandoval, Amanda Seyfried, Sissy Spacek, Robin Wright Penn	
2006	Babel	Boubker Ait El Caid, Adriana Barraza, Gael García Bernal, Cate Blanchett, Rinko Kikuchi, Brad Pitt, Said Tarchani, Kōji Yakusho	
2006	For Your Consideration	Bob Balaban, Jennifer Coolidge, Christopher Guest, John Michael Higgins, Eugene Levy, Jane Lynch, Michael McKean, Catherine O'Hara, Parker Posey, Harry Shearer, Fred Willard	
2006	Little Miss Sunshine	Alan Arkin, Abigail Breslin, Steve Carell, Toni Collette, Paul Dano, Greg Kinnear	
2006	A Prairie Home Companion	Woody Harrelson, Tommy Lee Jones, L. Q. Jones, Garrison Keillor, Kevin Kline, Lindsay Lohan, Virginia Madsen, John C. Reilly, Maya Rudolph, Tim Russell, Sue Scott, Meryl Streep, Lily Tomlin	
2006	Shortbus	Raphael Barker, Lindsay Beamish, Jay Brannan, Justin Vivian Bond, Paul Dawson, PJ DeBoy, Sook-Yin Lee, Peter Stickles	
2007	Before the Devil Knows You're Dead	Albert Finney, Rosemary Harris, Ethan Hawke, Philip Seymour Hoffman, Brían F. O'Byrne, Amy Ryan, Michael Shannon, Marisa Tomei	
2007	Talk to Me	Cedric the Entertainer, Don Cheadle, Chiwetel Ejiofor, Mike Epps, Vondie Curtis Hall, Taraji P. Henson, Martin Sheen	
2007	The Last Winter	Connie Britton, Kevin Corrigan, Zach Gilford, James LeGros, Ron Perlman	
2007	Margot at the Wedding	Jack Black, Flora Cross, Ciarán Hinds, Nicole Kidman, Jennifer Jason Leigh, Zane Pais, John Turturro	
2007	The Savages	Philip Bosco, Philip Seymour Hoffman, Laura Linney	
2008	Synecdoche, New York	Hope Davis, Philip Seymour Hoffman, Catherine Keener, Jennifer Jason Leigh, Samantha Morton, Tom Noonan, Emily Watson, Dianne Wiest, Michelle Williams	
2008	Vicky Cristina Barcelona	Javier Bardem, Penélope Cruz, Rebecca Hall, Scarlett Johansson	
2008	Ballast	Johnny McPhail, Tarra Riggs, Jim Myron Ross, Michael J. Smith Sr.	
2008	Rachel Getting Married	Tunde Adebimpe, Rosemarie DeWitt, Anisa George, Anne Hathaway, Bill Irwin, Anna Deavere Smith, Debra Winger, Mather Zickel	
2008	The Visitor	Hiam Abbass, Danai Gurira, Richard Jenkins, Haaz Sleiman	
2009	The Hurt Locker	Ralph Fiennes, Brian Geraghty, Evangeline Lilly, Anthony Mackie, David Morse, Guy Pearce, Jeremy Renner	
2009	Adventureland	Jesse Eisenberg, Bill Hader, Margarita Levieva, Ryan Reynolds, Martin Starr, Kristen Stewart, Kristen Wiig	
2009	Cold Souls	Paul Giamatti, Dina Korzun, David Strathairn, Emily Watson, Katheryn Winnick	
2009	A Serious Man	Richard Kind, Sari Lennick, Fred Melamed, Michael Stuhlbarg	
2009	Sugar	Richard Bull, Michael Gaston, Andre Holland, Ellary Porterfield, Rayniel Rufino, Algenis Perez Soto, Jaime Tirelli, Ann Whitney	

=== 2010s ===
Year	Film	Winners and nominees	Ref.
2010	Winter's Bone	Kevin Breznahan, Dale Dickey, Garret Dillahunt, John Hawkes, Jennifer Lawrence, Lauren Sweetser	
2010	The Kids Are All Right	Annette Bening, Josh Hutcherson, Julianne Moore, Mark Ruffalo, Mia Wasikowska	
2010	Life During Wartime	Shirley Henderson, Ciarán Hinds, Allison Janney, Michael Lerner, Chris Marquette, Rich Pecci, Paul Reubens, Charlotte Rampling, Ally Sheedy, Dylan Riley Snyder, Renée Taylor, Michael K. Williams	
2010	Please Give	Ann Guilbert, Rebecca Hall, Catherine Keener, Thomas Ian Nicholas, Amanda Peet, Oliver Platt, Lois Smith, Sarah Steele	
2010	Tiny Furniture	David Call, Grace Dunham, Lena Dunham, Sarah Sophie Flicker, Rachel Howe, Garland Hunter, Isen Hunter, Alex Karpovsky, Jemima Kirke, Amy Seimetz, Laurie Simmons, Merritt Wever	
2011	Beginners	Keegan Boos, Mary Page Keller, Mélanie Laurent, Kai Lennox, Ewan McGregor, Christopher Plummer, Goran Višnjić	
2011	The Descendants	Mary Birdsong, Beau Bridges, George Clooney, Robert Forster, Judy Greer, Rob Huebel, Nick Krause, Matthew Lillard, Amara Miller, Shailene Woodley	
2011	Margin Call	Penn Badgley, Simon Baker, Paul Bettany, Jeremy Irons, Aasif Mandvi, Mary McDonnell, Demi Moore, Zachary Quinto, Kevin Spacey, Stanley Tucci	
2011	Martha Marcy May Marlene	Christopher Abbott, Brady Corbet, Hugh Dancy, Maria Dizzia, Julia Garner, John Hawkes, Louisa Krause, Elizabeth Olsen, Sarah Paulson	
2011	Take Shelter	Kathy Baker, Jessica Chastain, LisaGay Hamilton, Robert Longstreet, Ray McKinnon, Katy Mixon, Michael Shannon, Tova Stewart, Shea Whigham	
2012	Your Sister's Sister	Emily Blunt, Rosemarie DeWitt, Mark Duplass	
2012	Bernie	Jack Black, Shirley MacLaine, Matthew McConaughey	
2012	Moonrise Kingdom	Bob Balaban, Jared Gilman, Kara Hayward, Frances McDormand, Bill Murray, Edward Norton, Jason Schwartzman, Tilda Swinton, Bruce Willis	
2012	Safety Not Guaranteed	Kristen Bell, Jenica Bergere, Mark Duplass, Jeff Garlin, Jake Johnson, Aubrey Plaza, Mary Lynn Rajskub, Karan Soni	
2012	Silver Linings Playbook	Bradley Cooper, Robert De Niro, Anupam Kher, Jennifer Lawrence, Chris Tucker, Jacki Weaver	

== Special non-competitive awards ==
=== 2010s ===
Year	Film	Winners and nominees	Ref.
2014	Foxcatcher	Steve Carell, Mark Ruffalo, and Channing Tatum	
2015	Spotlight	Billy Crudup, Brian d'Arcy James, Michael Keaton, Rachel McAdams, Mark Ruffalo, Liev Schreiber, John Slattery, and Stanley Tucci	
2016	Moonlight	Mahershala Ali, Naomie Harris, Alex R. Hibbert, André Holland, Jharrel Jerome, Janelle Monáe, Jaden Piner, Trevante Rhodes, and Ashton Sanders	
2017	Mudbound	Jonathan Banks, Mary J. Blige, Jason Clarke, Garrett Hedlund, Jason Mitchell, Rob Morgan, and Carey Mulligan	
2018	The Favourite	Olivia Colman, Emma Stone, and Rachel Weisz	
2019	Not given		

=== 2020s ===
Year	Film	Recipients	Ref.
2020	The Trial of the Chicago 7	Yahya Abdul-Mateen II, Sacha Baron Cohen, Caitlin FitzGerald, Joseph Gordon-Levitt, Kelvin Harrison Jr., Michael Keaton, Alice Kremelberg, Frank Langella, Eddie Redmayne, Mark Rylance, Ben Shenkman, and Jeremy Strong	
2021	The Harder They Fall	Zazie Beetz, Deon Cole, RJ Cyler, Danielle Deadwyler, Idris Elba, Edi Gathegi, Regina King, Delroy Lindo, Jonathan Majors, Lakeith Stanfield, and Damon Wayans Jr.	
2022	Fire Island	Nick Adams, Joel Kim Booster, Margaret Cho, Tomás Matos, Torian Miller, Zane Phillips, Conrad Ricamora, Matt Rogers, James Scully and Bowen Yang	
2023	Not given		
2024	The Piano Lesson	John David Washington, Samuel L. Jackson, Ray Fisher, Danielle Deadwyler, Michael Potts, Corey Hawkins and Erykah Badu	
2025	Sinners	Michael B. Jordan, Hailee Steinfeld, Miles Caton, Jack O'Connell, Wunmi Mosaku, Jayme Lawson, Omar Benson Miller, Buddy Guy, Li Jun Li, and Delroy Lindo	

== Multiple competitive awards ==
2 awards

- Philip Seymour Hoffman

== Multiple competitive nominations ==
3 nominations

- Philip Seymour Hoffman

2 nominations

- Kathy Baker
- Bob Balaban
- Jack Black
- Don Cheadle
- George Clooney
- Jeff Daniels
- Rosemarie DeWitt
- Mark Duplass
- Jesse Eisenberg
- William Fichtner
- Rebecca Hall
- LisaGay Hamilton
- Anne Hathaway
- John Hawkes
- Ciarán Hinds
- Catherine Keener
- Jennifer Lawrence
- Jennifer Jason Leigh
- Laura Linney
- Michael Shannon
- David Strathairn
- Emily Watson
- Michelle Williams

== See also ==
- Screen Actors Guild Award for Outstanding Performance by a Cast in a Motion Picture
- Satellite Award for Best Cast – Motion Picture
- Robert Altman Award
