= DeBoy =

DeBoy or Deboy is a surname. Notable people with the surname include:

- Curtis Deboy (born 1990), Australian rules football umpire
- Paul DeBoy (born 1955), American actor
- PJ DeBoy (born Paul J. DeBoy in 1971), American actor
- Steven J. DeBoy Sr. (born 1956), Democratic member of the Maryland House of Delegates
