= Always, Then, & Now =

Studio album by Jay Brannan
- Released: July 15, 2014
- Genre: Folk, Acoustic
- Label: Great Depression
- Producer: Jay Brannan, Drew Brody

Jay Brannan chronology
Rob Me Blind (2012)	Always, Then, & Now (2014)

Always, Then, & Now stylized as Always, Then + Now is the fourth studio album of independent singer songwriter Jay Brannan after his albums Goddamned in 2008, In Living Cover in 2009 and Rob Me Blind in 2012. The 12-track album on his own independent Great Depression Records was released on 15 July 2014. It was produced in collaboration with Drew Brody who first worked with Brannan on his 2009 album In Living Color.

The track "Blue-Haired Lady" was the first official single release accompanied by a video release directed by Who Ate My Teeth and strings by Skye Steele. The follow-up was "Square One" accompanied by an official video release directed by ThreadKillers. The tracks were produced by Jay Brannan & Drew Brody and arrangement and instrumentation by Scott Starrett.

== Track list ==
1. "Always, Then, & Now" (3:33)
2. "Blue-Haired Lady" (4:00)
3. "Elusive Knight" (3:28)
4. "Takeoff" (2:26)
5. "Square One" (3:32)
6. "Burn Into the Son" (3:52)
7. "No Ship" (1:26)
8. "After All This" (4:15)
9. "My Last Day on Earth" (4:04)
10. "My Love, My Love" (3:21)
11. "Uncle Auntie-Socialite" (4:23)
12. "Changed" (3:46)
