= Crabs for Christmas =

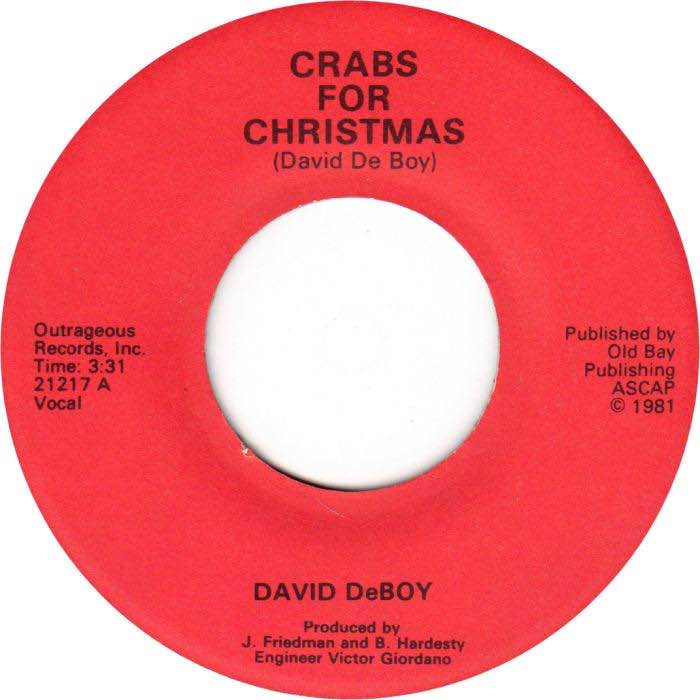

Single by David DeBoy
- Released: 1981
- Studio: Flight Three Records
- Genre: Novelty; Christmas
- Label: Outrageous Records
- Songwriter: David DeBoy

"Crabs for Christmas" is a Christmas song by American actor and playwright David DeBoy. Published in 1981 as a Baltimore-area Christmas song, it is about a person from Maryland living in Houston, asking Santa Claus for crab and a beer as a Christmas gift. While one radio station refused to air "Crabs for Christmas" due to its use of the Baltimore accent, it has become a Maryland holiday tradition.

== Background and release ==
It wasn't until 1979 or '80 when I heard this song on the radio called "Grandma Got Run Over by a Reindeer". And it wasn't this beautifully orchestrated Christmas song with Bing Crosby or Bob Hope or anything. It sounded like a bunch of drunks in a basement and they were just recording for fun. And I thought, "I can do THAT. Yeah, I can do that."

— DeBoy on his inspiration to write "Crabs for Christmas", 2023

DeBoy, the brother of fellow actor Paul, recorded "Crabs for Christmas" in 1980. After previously writing songs about non-human objects, he sought to make a Christmas song, capitalizing on increased music purchases during that period. Despite abandoning the idea, he reconsidered it after hearing "Grandma Got Run Over by a Reindeer" by Elmo and Patsy. He felt it was relatable to informally recorded humorous songs.

DeBoy made the song have a local theme to appeal to people from Baltimore, and he said he wrote it with a title-first approach, the same way he wrote plays. He founded Outrageous Records with his friend Brent Hardesty to release the song, after which he held a 10-hour taping session at Flite Three Records in Baltimore, with eight hours of recording and two of mixing. DeBoy said he recorded "Crabs for Christmas" with "friends I grabbed by the arm".

DeBoy, who was then 28 years old, released "Crabs for Christmas" in 1981 as a 7-inch single, under Outrageous Records and distributed by the Schwartz Brothers of Lanham. It first played on WFBR radio station on November 28. DeBoy spent $5,000 (equivalent to $17,293 in 2024) to produce 10,000 45 RPM singles.

"Crabs for Christmas" sold 10,000 copies by December 22, and DeBoy ordered the production of another 3,000. DeBoy said the record was made for Baltimore, saying "I don't know what I would have done if it had caught on [nationally]. I'm stretched thin now." According to DeBoy, "Crabs for Christmas" was estimated to reach 12,000 sales by the end of the 1981 Christmas season. Another 4,000 copies were sold in 2001, the song's 20th anniversary.

== Composition ==
"Crabs for Christmas" features a man from Baltimore with a stereotypical accent asking Santa Claus for crab and a beer as a Christmas gift at "a department store north of Houston".

== Reception ==
Writing for The Baltimore Sun, Lisa DeNike described "Crabs for Christmas" as "spicy and home-towney as Old Bay Seasoning and refreshing as a cold brew." While one radio station refused to air "Crabs for Christmas" due to DeBoy's use of the Baltimore accent, DeBoy responded that "most people think it's the greatest thing" and that "I don't think there's anything wrong with that accent".

== Personnel ==
Adapted from the single label and The Baltimore Sun:

- Victor Giordano – engineer
- J. Friedman – producer
- Brent Hardesty – producer, piano, drums, and synthesizer
- Nancy Krebbs – mandolin
- Chris Calligan – vocals
- Cheryl Horn – vocals
- Doug Roberts – crowd effects
- Roberts's three children – crowd effects

== Legacy ==
After the success of "Crabs for Christmas", DeBoy released "Downyocean" (Note: Also capitalized "DownyOcean" and known as "Down the Ocean") (pronounced "down the ocean") with the people with whom he recorded "Crabs for Christmas", now known as the Fool Brothers, in 1982. On the B-side of "Downyocean" was "Meetcha at the Fair", (Note: Also known as "City Fair") scheduled to be presented at the Baltimore City Fair.

Inspired by a discussion with Marty Bass on the WJZ morning show, DeBoy made an album commemorating the 20th anniversary of "Crabs for Christmas", including remakes of it and "Meetcha at the Fair", in 2000. In 2001, DeBoy joked that some believed "Crabs for Christmas" continuing to air on radio stations during Christmas "has contributed to the city's population decline". He released Crabs for Christmas - Live, a CD of thirteen Baltimore-centric tracks to commemorate the song's thirtieth anniversary; this included "Crabs for Christmas", as well as tracks such as "Biggest Star in Hampden" and "Baltimore Vowels".

DeBoy released a book, I Gave Baltimore Crabs! (for Christmas), about his musical activities. It chronicled his attempts to remake "Maryland, My Maryland", the former state anthem of Maryland that supported the Confederate States of America, and get it adopted as the new anthem. "Crabs for Christmas" remains a Maryland holiday tradition.
