= Rob Me Blind =

Studio album by Jay Brannan
- Released: March 27, 2012
- Genres: Folk, acoustic
- Labels: Great Depression, Nettwerk
- Producers: Jay Brannan, David Kahne

Jay Brannan chronology
In Living Cover (2009)	Rob Me Blind (2012)	Always, Then, & Now (2014)

Rob Me Blind is the third studio album of independent singer songwriter Jay Brannan after his albums Goddamned in 2008 and In Living Cover in 2009. The 10-track album on his own independent Great Depression Records was released on 27 March 2012 and was produced by Grammy-winning producer David Kahne who had produced albums for artists like Tony Bennett, Paul McCartney, Regina Spektor and others. With Kahne, he experimented in this new album with new arrangements and even using some percussion instruments, although in his earlier material, he had tried to stay away from such usage, saying they were too loud. The result is still acoustic and melodic but with "some additional texture to it" as he put it in an interview with Instinct magazine

The track "Greatest Hits" was the pre-release and first official single release from the forthcoming album. Brannan released the track "Beautifully" as a second official single from the album to coincide with the release of the album, accompanied by an official video release directed by Grant Carden and Dillon Mangrann-Wells. Carden was also responsible for the cinematography. The follow-up third single was the title track "Rob Me Blind" from the album again accompanied by an official music video.

== Track list ==
1. "Everywhere There's Statues" (3:26)
2. "Beautifully" (3:14)
3. "The Spanglish Song" (3:57)
4. "Rob Me Blind" (5:03)
5. "Greatest Hits" (3:50)
6. "La La La" (3:40)
7. "Denmark" (3:34)
8. "Myth of Happiness" (3:34)
9. "The State of Music" (4:21)
10. "A Love Story" (3:23)
