= Jay Brannan =

American singer-songwriter and actor

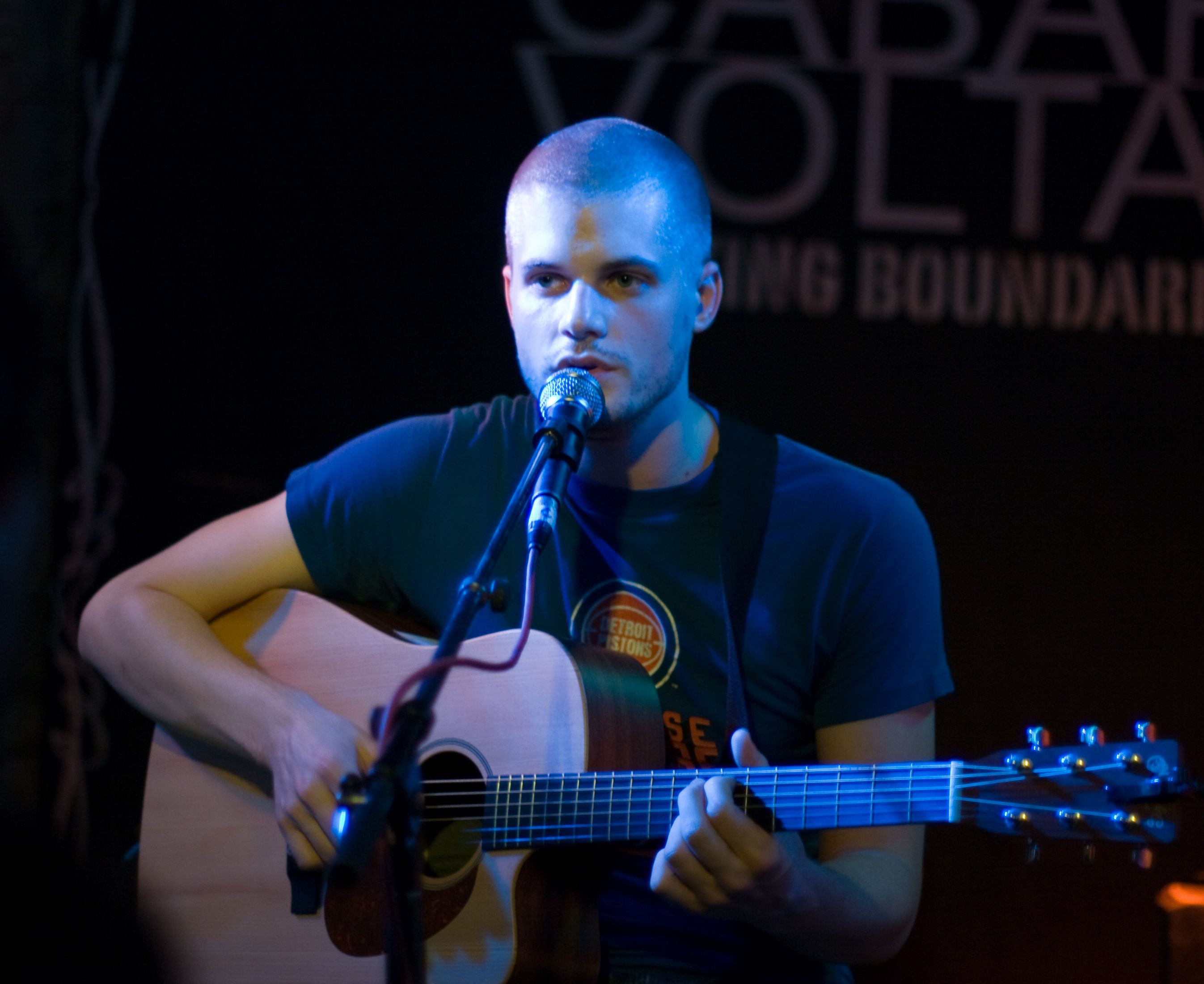
- Brannan performs in Edinburgh, Scotland, in August 2008

Background information
- Born: March 29, 1982 (age 44)
- Occupations: Singer; songwriter; actor
- Instruments: Vocals; guitar
- Years active: 2006–present
- Labels: Great Depression; Nettwerk
- Website: jaybrannan.com

Jay Brannan (born March 29, 1982) is an American singer-songwriter and actor. He was born in Texas and briefly studied in Ohio, but moved to California to become an actor. Brannan appeared in the 2006 movie Shortbus, which included one of his songs in its soundtrack, and began to build a fan base by performing on YouTube. He released an EP and acted in Holding Trevor in 2007. Since then, he has toured and released four albums.

== Early life and career ==
Brannan was born 1982 in Texas in a middle-class family and grew up as the son of a petroleum engineer and a teacher. He described his family as conservative Baptists and mentions their beliefs on homosexuality. Brannan went to college for one semester in Cincinnati, Ohio, and went to California, first to Palm Springs and later to Los Angeles, trying to become an actor. In 2002, he was shown a casting notice and, after the end of a relationship, moved to New York City and submitted an audition tape. He also worked as a proofreader of legal documents for a translation company.

Brannan was cast in 2003 for the movie Shortbus and worked as a proofreader and in other jobs to support himself. He contributed the song "Soda Shop" to the film's soundtrack, which he stated was his "first professionally recorded track". The song was also released on Team Love Records. Brannan began to record sparse music videos for YouTube, accompanying himself on the guitar, and built an international fan base without corporate sponsorship, using MySpace and Blogspot. In 2007, he appeared in the movie Holding Trevor as the promiscuous best friend of the protagonist, and released a limited-edition EP with fours songs named disasterpiece or Unmastered, adding two additional songs for a 2008 re-release.

In July 2008, Brannan released the album Goddamned through his own label, Great Depression Records, and toured ten dates, a departure from his previous practice of short tours of about four concerts. The same year, Brannan left his proofreading job and sustained himself with earnings from concerts and merchandise. His second album, In Living Cover, was released in 2009 and reached number ten on the Billboard Top Heatseekers chart for the week of July 25, 2009. Brannan promoted the album in an interview on ABC News's Now in July 2009. Always, Then, & Now, his fourth studio album, was released on July 15, 2014, on his own independent label Great Depression Records.

== Style ==
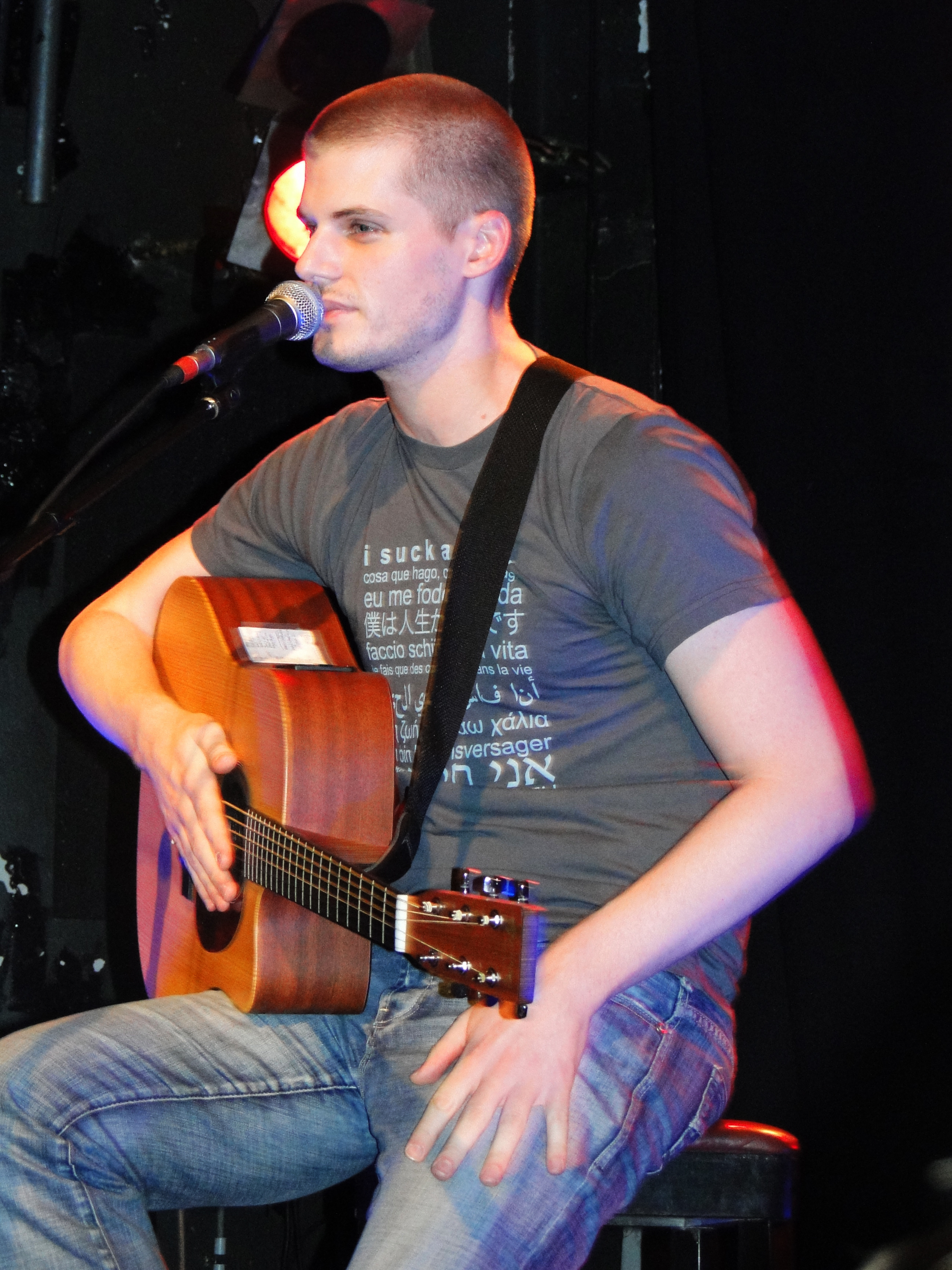
Jay Brannan in Hamburg, Germany, in 2009

Brannan is a tenor. Allmusic described his style as contemporary singer-songwriter and compared him to female artists, including Ani DiFranco, Lisa Loeb, Sinéad O'Connor, and Liz Phair. Goddamned was described as lo-fi and Brannan compared his concerts to intimate performances in his home. He has performed with Terra Naomi and both were compared in style and described as performing indie folk. The New York Times stated in 2006 that Brannan was sometimes compared to singer-songwriter Rufus Wainwright and that Brannan saw himself as echoing the angry and sad sound of female singers like Tracy Chapman and Joni Mitchell.

== Awards and nominations ==
- In 2006, he was nominated at the Gotham Awards for Best Ensemble Cast for role in 2006 film Shortbus (joint nomination with Sook-Yin Lee, Paul Dawson, Lindsay Beamish, PJ DeBoy, Raphael Barker, Peter Stickles and Justin Vivian Bond).
- In 2012, he was nominated for a Genie Award in the category "Best Achievement in Music – Original Song" for his song "My Love, My Love" from the soundtrack of 2011 film Cloudburst.

== Discography ==
=== Studio albums ===
- 2008: Goddamned
- 2009: In Living Cover
- 2012: Rob Me Blind
- 2014: Always, Then, & Now

=== Extended plays ===
- 2007: Unmastered (re-released in 2008 with additional songs)
- 2013: Around the World in 80 Jays
- 2016: New York, New York

=== Singles ===
Year	Single	Album
2007	"Body's a temple"	Unmastered EP
2008	"Housewife"	Goddamned
2008	"Can't Have It All"	Goddamned
2009	"Beautifully"	In Living Cover (also included later in Rob Me Blind)
2009	"The Freshmen"	In Living Cover
2012	"Greatest Hits" (Promotional single)	Rob Me Blind
2012	"Beautifully"	Rob Me Blind
2012	"Rob Me Blind"	Rob Me Blind
2014	"Blue-Haired Lady"	Always, Then, & Now
2014	"Square One"	Always, Then, & Now

Songs

- "Soda Shop" (track on the 2006 Shortbus soundtrack)
- "Lower My Gun" (track on the 2008 Holding Trevor soundtrack)
- "My Love, My Love" and "Takeoff" (two tracks on the 2011 Cloudburst soundtrack)

=== Videography ===
- "Body's a Temple"
- "Housewife"
- "Can't Have It All"
- "Greatest Hits"
- "Beautifully"
- "Rob Me Blind"
- "Blue-Haired Lady"
- "Square One"

== Filmography ==
=== Film ===
Year	Title	Role	Notes
2006	Shortbus	Ceth	
2007	Holding Trevor	Jake	
2012	Kiss of the Damned	Hans	
