= Peter Moore Smith =

American novelist

- Born: 1965 (age 60–61)
- Occupation: Novelist
- Spouse: Brigette Roth Smith
- Children: 1
- Relatives: Julianne Moore (sister)
- Writing career
- Genre: Fiction
- Notable works: Forgetting the Girl, Oblivion, Nebraska
- Notable awards: Pushcart Prize
- Website: petermooresmith.blogspot.com

Peter Moore Smith (born 1965) is an American writer and was the recipient of the 2000 Pushcart Prize for his short story "Oblivion, Nebraska." He has written two novels, Raveling and Los Angeles, both published by Little, Brown.

His short story Oblivion, Nebraska was adapted into a 2006 film by director Charles Haine. His short story Forgetting the Girl was selected for the Best American Mystery Stories anthology in 2000. A film adaptation was directed by Nate Taylor.

Smith is the brother of actress Julianne Moore. He currently resides with his wife, Brigette, and their son, Wolfgang, in New York City.

== "Oblivion, Nebraska" ==
"Oblivion Nebraska" was first published in the Spring 1996 issue of The Massachusetts Review. It was later selected for publication as part of the Pushcart Prize, in Pushcart Prize XXVI: Best of the Small Presses.

The short story was adapted twice, once for film and once as a stage reading. The short film premiered at the 2006 Australian International Film Festival. The film ran for 11 minutes and starred Jeremy Davidson, Sterling Beaumon, and Nicole Ansari-Cox. The story has been read as part of a live storytelling performance by WordTheatre. Kliatt described it as "a droll but ultimately bittersweet tale by Peter Moore Smith about a young boy's attempt to define his world after the loss of his mother". Harper Audio published a recording of the performance alongside other two other stories also read by WordTheatre performers.
