= Holding Trevor =

- Theatrical release poster
- Directed by: Rosser Goodman
- Written by: Brent Gorski
- Produced by: Rosser Goodman; Brent Gorski
- Starring: Brent Gorski; Jay Brannan; Melissa Searing; Eli Kranski; Christopher Wyllie
- Cinematography: Kara Stephens
- Edited by: Donna Matthewson
- Distributed by: Regent Releasing
- Release dates: June 16, 2007 (San Francisco International Lesbian and Gay Film Festival); July 4, 2008 (United States)
- Running time: 88 minutes
- Country: United States
- Language: English
- Budget: $55,000
- Box office: $16,814

Holding Trevor is a 2007 American gay romantic-drama written by and starring Brent Gorski as Trevor and produced and directed by Rosser Goodman.

== Plot ==
Young, friendly, and intelligent, Trevor Holden (Brent Gorski) is in a stalemate. Entangled in an unhealthy relationship with Darrell (Christopher Wyllie), a seductive but self-destructive heroin addict, and trapped at a low-paying job, Trevor finds scant comfort in Los Angeles' vapid party scene, where conversation rarely rises above inquiries like "So, are you an actor?" Worse still, he and his two best friends - roommate Andie (Melissa Searing) and singer Jake (Jay Brannan) - are being pulled apart by boredom and discontent. At the hospital for his boyfriend's latest overdose, Trevor finds a potential new beginning in Ephram (Eli Kranski), a medical intern with ambition, a warm demeanor and strikingly good looks. After they spend a romantic evening together, Trevor seems poised to make some changes. He begins by ending his relationship with Darrell and then strives to reconnect with Andie and Jake. But what should be a joyous event - a party celebrating a negative HIV test - results in Andie secretly discovering she is HIV positive because of a drunken hookup. Later on, Trevor gets into a fight with Darrell at the party, which is overheard by the guests and causes a rift between Trevor and Ephram. Trevor is devastated by the tragic death of Darrell after an overdose. Ephram informs Trevor of Darrell's death and seeks to comfort him in the aftermath. After being offered a job in New York City, Ephram confesses his love for Trevor and suggests he abandon his life in Los Angeles and come live with him. Andie, reeling from her frightening revelation, seeks comfort in Trevor and pleads with him to not leave. Trevor is torn between pursuing the love of his life or staying to assist a dear friend in need. Trevor remains committed to bettering his life, but realizes that some people are too precious to abandon.

== Cast ==
- Brent Gorski as Trevor Holden
- Christopher Wyllie as Darrell
- Jay Brannan as Jake
- Melissa Searing as Andie
- Eli Kranski as Ephram

== Soundtrack ==
- "Suburbia Floating" (Composed by Scott Starrett)
- "Dark Delay" (Composed by Robert Heskin)
- "Dirty Numbers" (Written by Aaron Tashjian, Performed by Swig Tooth)
- "Envelope Marked X" (Composed by Gravity Terminal)
- "Bypassed" (Composed by Gravity Terminal)
- "Stop" (Written and performed by Alex Davis)
- "Athletico" (Composed by Jeremy Sherman)
- "Spanish Rumba" (Composed by Daniel Cox)
- "Bolero del Sol" (Composed by Chuck Henry)
- "Red Queen" (Written and performed by Gabe Lopez
- "Beautiful Lies" (Written by Stuart Mathis, Holly Mathis and Deanna Dozier, performed by Deanna Dozier, recorded by Stuart Mathis)
- "Running from the Sum" (Written by Michael Frieman and performed by Check in the Dark)
- "Lower My Gun" (Written and performed by Jay Brannan)
- "Far Too Deep" (Written and performed by Gabe Lopez)
- "Rewind" (Written and performed by Aaron Tashjian)

== Critical reception ==
The film received mostly poor reviews from critics, but was internationally acclaimed. Review aggregator Rotten Tomatoes reports that 13% of professional critics gave the film a positive review, with a rating average of 3.8 out of 10. Most critics panned the film's plot. Dennis Harvey of Variety magazine called it a "vanity project" and said that the film "comes off as Joan Crawford-esque, star-flattering melodrama on an Amerindie scale", while Julia Wallace of Village Voice stated: "There's nothing to fill up the 88 minutes of the film except for the idle bitchery spewed by nearly every character."
