= Rosser Goodman =

American film producer

- Born: Rosser Goodman
- Occupations: Director, Writer, Producer
- Years active: 1999–2018

Rosser Goodman is an American film and television director, writer and producer. Goodman founded her own production company, KGB Films in the 90's upon moving to Hollywood. Goodman's company is now called Circle Content in partnership with fashion designer and costume designer Oneita Parker.

== Career ==
In the 90s in Los Angeles, Rosser helped to organize Film Fatale, which was described as an "underground lesbian screening series" in a retrospective by the Los Angeles Blade.

Rosser went on to direct and produce Holding Trevor. A darkly comedic, coming-of-age film. Regent Releasing nabbed the film at its first Los Angeles festival premiere. Regent delivered a U.S. theatrical release and bought all North American rights. Additionally, the film sold in Western Europe. Regent Entertainment eventually bought the worldwide rights. Dennis Harvey at Variety said "director Rosser Goodman delivers a polished product with solid tech values." At the Los Angeles Times, Kevin Thomas said "Director Rosser Goodman makes the crucial decisions facing Trevor suspenseful and involving -- and tinged with humor as well as pathos."

Goodman directed and produced the hilarious and heartwarming romantic comedy, Love or Whatever, released by TLA in the United States and Europe, in 2014.

The Hollywood Reporter honored Goodman as one of the "Five in Focus" film directors. Goodman won multiple audience awards for her films including the Berlin Lesbian Festival and the Freiberg Lesbian film Festival. Her original script, Mongoose8, won the Panasonic Filmmakers' Award.

Goodman's work has received distribution through Bildkraft, CFMDC, HERE! TV, Netflix, Optimal, PBS, Peccadillo Pictures, Regent Releasing, Sundance TV, TLA, Wolfe Video, Hulu, Dekkoo, and world film festivals such as Frameline, ImageOut, Feminale, MadCat, Mezipatra, Outfest, Mix Mexico, Mix Brazil, and Verzaubert to name only a few.

Goodman was selected as one of 50 Women Changing Hollywood.

In 2015, she was honored by the MSE foundation with an award for lifetime achievement. She is a member of the Alliance of Women Directors.

== Filmography ==
Year	Title	Writer	Director	Producer	Notes
1997	Top of the World	Yes	No	Yes	Short Film
1999	Wet Dress	Yes	Yes	Yes	Short Film
2000	Life's a Butch!	Yes	Yes	Yes	Short Film
2001	Breaking Up Really Sucks	No	No	Yes	Short Film
2002	Daddy-O	Yes	Yes	Yes	Documentary short
2003	Drama	Yes	Yes	Yes	Short Film
2004	Pain	Yes	Yes	Yes	Documentary short
2005	That's What I'm Talkin' 'Bout	No	Yes	Yes	Short Film
2006	Dropped	No	Yes	Yes	Documentary
2007	Holding Trevor	No	Yes	Yes	Feature Film
2012	Love or Whatever	No	Yes	Yes	Feature Film
2015	mongoose8	Yes	Yes	No	Short film
2017	Oneita Parker: Drawing with Stitches	Yes	Yes	Yes	Documentary short
2017	[in]visible	Yes	Yes	No	Short film
2018	Pea Pod	Yes	Yes	No	Short film

== See also ==
- List of female film and television directors
- List of lesbian filmmakers
- List of LGBT-related films directed by women
