= Donald E. Murphy =

American politician (born 1960)

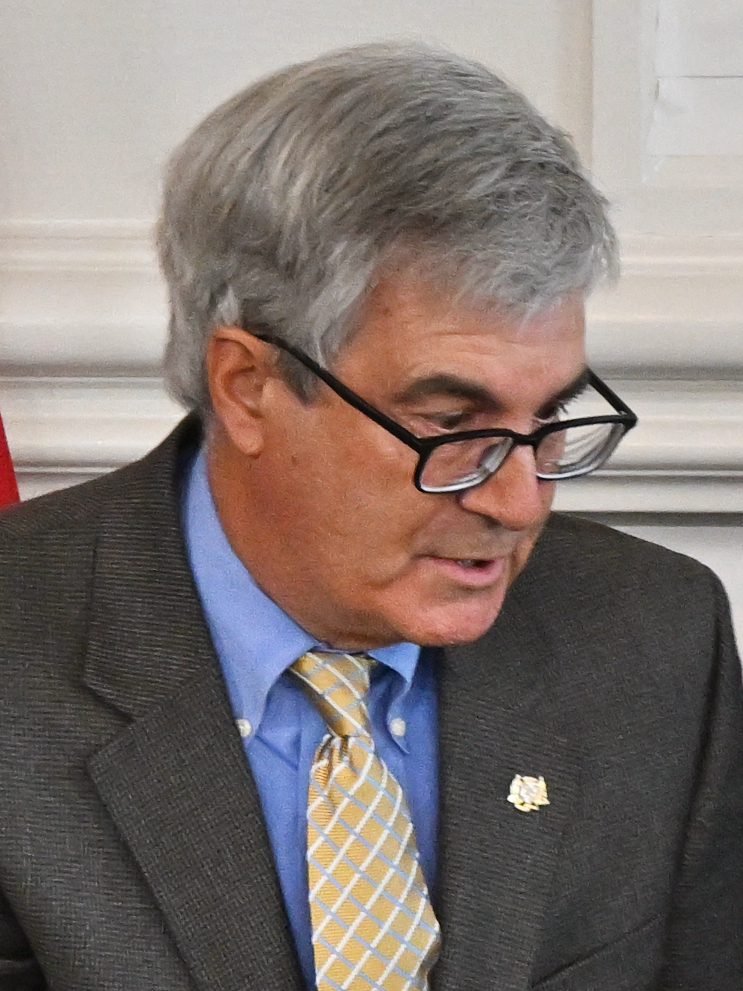
- Murphy in 2023

Member of the Maryland House of Delegates from the 12A district
- In office January 11, 1995 – January 8, 2003
- Preceded by: Kenneth H. Masters
- Succeeded by: Steven J. DeBoy Sr.

Personal details
- Born: July 8, 1960 (age 66) Baltimore, Maryland, U.S.
- Party: Republican
- Spouse: Gloria
- Children: 2
- Profession: Real estate consultant

Donald E. Murphy (born July 8, 1960) is an American politician who was a member of the Maryland House of Delegates, representing District 12A, which covered portions of Baltimore and Howard County Maryland.

== Education ==
Murphy was born in Baltimore on July 8, 1960. Murphy graduated from Andover Senior High School, afterwards attending the University of Baltimore, where he earned a Bachelor of Science degree in real estate and finance in 1983.

== Career ==
After graduating, Murphy worked as a real estate consultant. He was a co-founder of the Patapsco Valley Republican Club and a past president of the Holmehurst Community Association.

Murphy was first elected to the Maryland House of Delegates in 1994, defeating incumbent Democratic state delegate and House majority leader Kenneth Masters in the general election. He was re-elected in 1998 and decided against running for re-election to a third term after being redistricted into a majority-Black district. While a member of the Maryland House of Delegates, he was a member of the Judiciary Committee and the civil law and procedure subcommittee. He served as Deputy Minority Whip from 2002 until 2003. He also sponsored legislation to legalize medical marijuana.

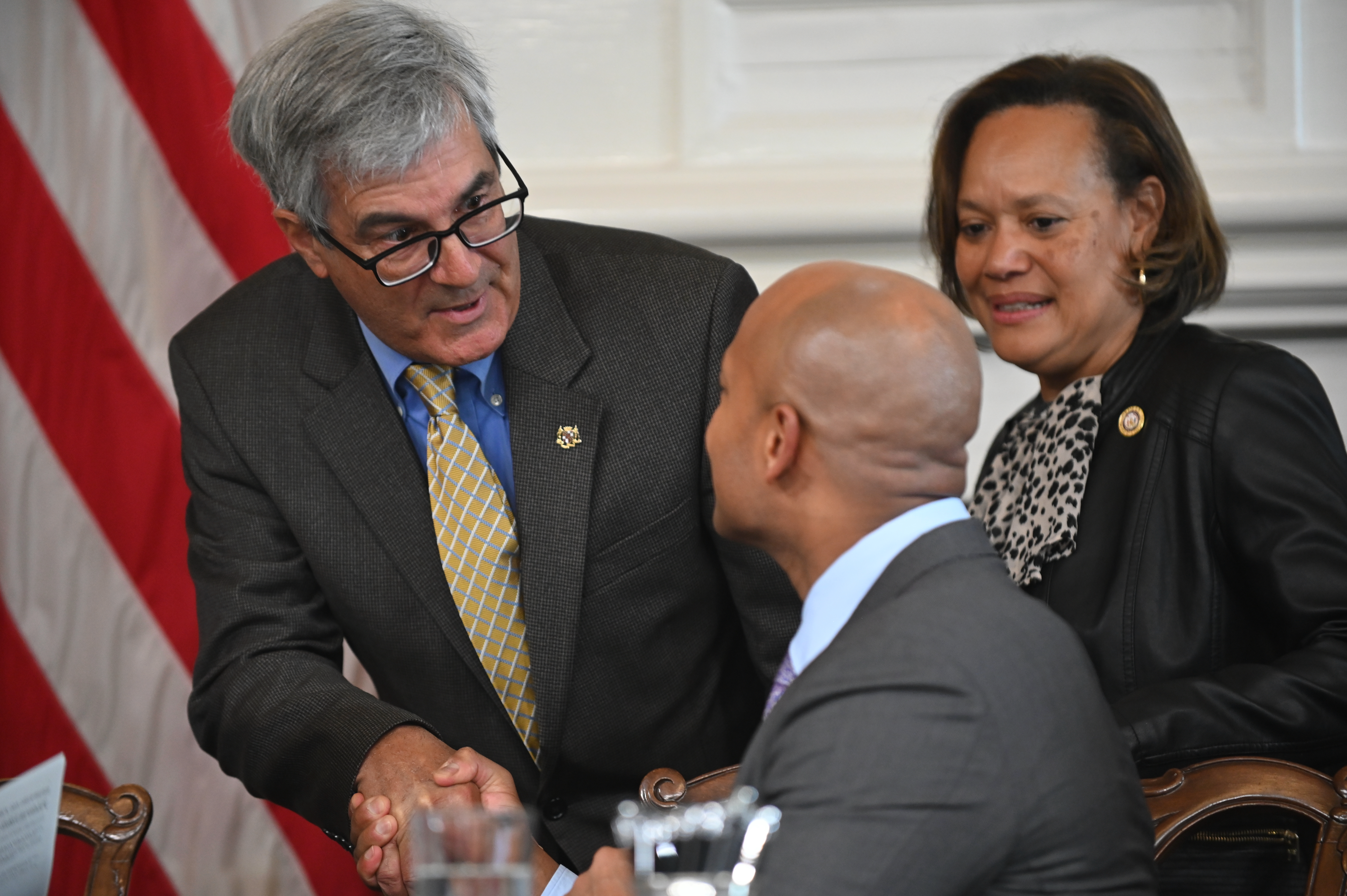
Murphy shaking hands with Governor Wes Moore, 2023

As of 2024, Murphy has been a delegate to every Republican National Convention since 2000. After leaving the legislature, Murphy served as the chair of the Baltimore County Republican Central Committee from 2002 to 2003, resigning to start a lobbying firm, Genn & Murphy, with former Democratic state delegate Gilbert J. Genn. Afterwards, Murphy worked as a Republican strategist, serving in 2010 as advisor to unsuccessful U.S. Senate candidate Eric Wargotz. As of April 2015, Murphy works as a federal policies analyst for the Marijuana Policy Project.

== Personal life ==
Murphy is married to his wife, Gloria, who was a delegate to the 2004 Republican National Convention. Together, they have a son and a daughter.

== Electoral history ==
Maryland House of Delegates District 12A election, 1994
Party	Candidate	Votes	%
Republican	Donald E. Murphy	10,340	27.1
Democratic	James E. Malone Jr.	9,712	25.4
Republican	Donald Drehoff	9,596	25.1
Democratic	Kenneth H. Masters (incumbent)	8,527	22.3

Maryland House of Delegates District 12A election, 1998
Party	Candidate	Votes	%
Democratic	James E. Malone Jr. (incumbent)	13,222	31.4
Republican	Donald E. Murphy (incumbent)	10,920	26.0
Democratic	Steven J. DeBoy Sr.	10,669	25.4
Republican	Loyd V. Smith	7,245	17.2
