= Forgetting the Girl =

- Film poster
- Directed by: Nate Taylor
- Written by: Peter Moore Smith
- Produced by: Dennis Wallestad; Brian Gonsar; Victor C. Reyes; Camiren J. Romero; Nate Taylor
- Starring: Christopher Denham; Lindsay Beamish; Elizabeth Rice; Paul Sparks; Anna Camp; Joel de la Fuente; Phyllis Somerville
- Cinematography: Mark Pugh
- Edited by: Victoria Lesiw
- Music by: Robert Miller
- Release dates: March 2, 2012 (Cinequest Film Festival); October 11, 2013 (United States)
- Running time: 85 minutes
- Country: United States
- Language: English

Forgetting the Girl is a 2012 American horror thriller film directed by Nate Taylor, adapted for the screen by Peter Moore Smith, from his short story of the same name. It wrapped principal photography in August 2009, finished post-production in January 2012. The film had its world premiere at the Cinequest film festival on March 2, 2012. The sold out screening was well received and critics declared the film as "a beautifully dark psychodrama", "an impressive directorial debut" which "delivers something truly original and startling".

== Plot ==
Kevin Wolfe is a socially awkward photographer who specializes in taking headshots for aspiring models and actresses. His unsuccessful attempts to woo the beautiful women he photographs are overseen by his makeup artist Jamie, who has an unhealthy obsession with him. One day one of his clients, Adrienne, asks him out. Kevin accepts, but is upset when she ghosts him the day after, only returning to pick up her photos and tell him that it was only a one night stand. Adrienne is later reported missing by her sister, however Kevin is unable to provide any information as they only had the single date together.

Jamie's obsession with Kevin grows after he begins dating Beth, who wants to take things slow and doesn't want to sleep with him right away. Upset, Kevin takes Jamie out on a bowling date. The two get drunk and Jamie confesses her love. The two have sex, which Kevin later tells her is a mistake. The following day Jamie comes into the studio to discover that Kevin had murdered Beth, as he needed to forget about her. Jamie agrees to dispose of the body and further reveals that she had murdered Adrienne and any other women who had expressed interest in Kevin.

After the cleanup Jamie and Kevin both agree that she should die in order to ensure that he is safe, as by dying he will be seemingly unable to remember her. After she dies Kevin thinks about the drowning death of his sister, Nicole, while the two were children - a memory that had haunted him throughout the film. He admits that he had let his sister drown and that he had enjoyed the experience so much that he continued to kill throughout adulthood.

== Cast ==
- Christopher Denham - Kevin Wolfe
- Lindsay Beamish - Jamie
- Elizabeth Rice - Beth Dalewell
- Paul Sparks - Tanner
- Anna Camp - Adrienne Gilcrest
- Phyllis Somerville - Ruby
- Joel de la Fuente - Derek
- Holley Fain - Denise Gilcrest

== Release ==
The film was distributed in North America by RAM Releasing on October 11, 2013.

== Reception ==
David DeWitt, writing for The New York Times, found the film to be “forgettable”.
