= Holley Fain =

American actress (born 1981)

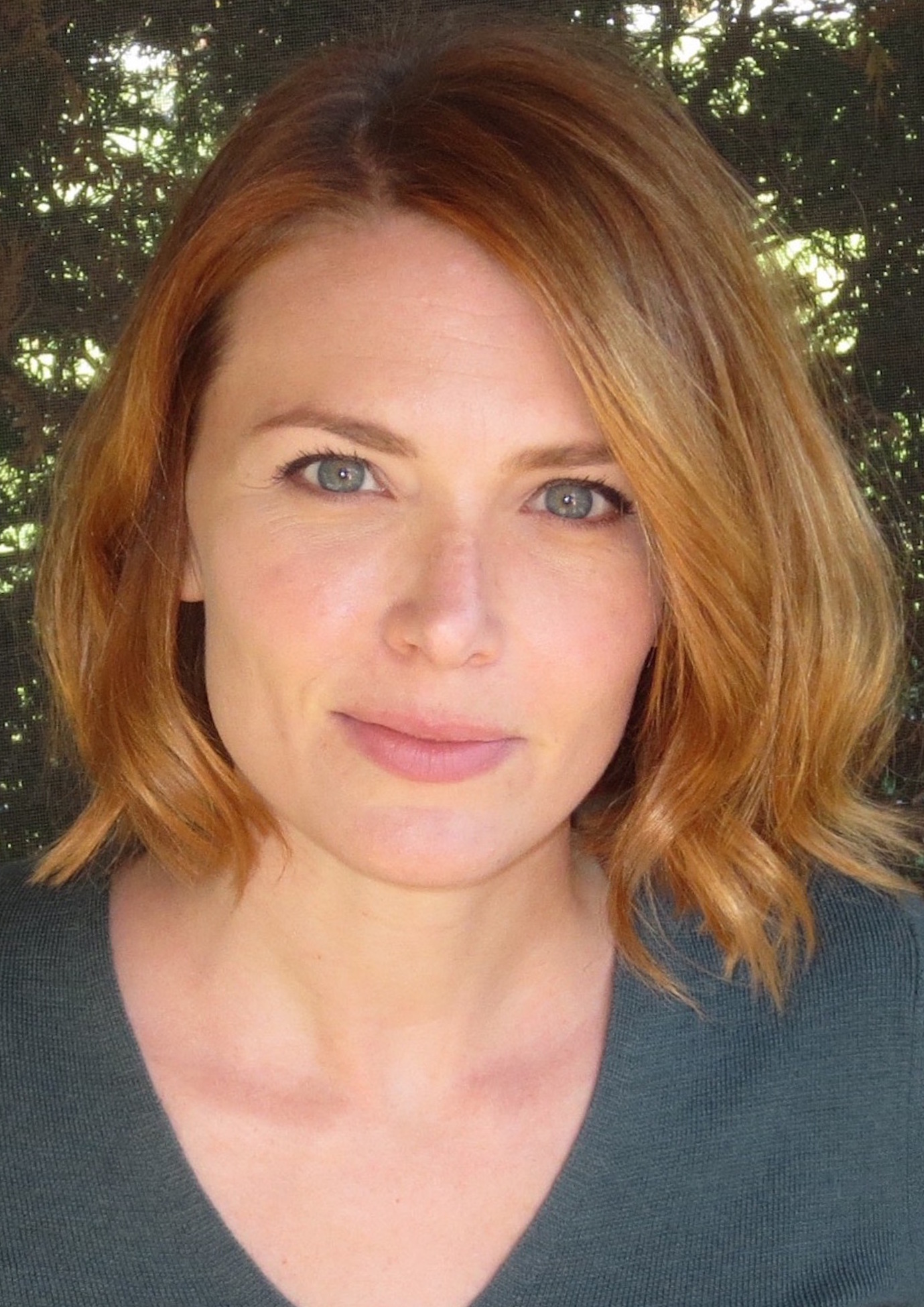
- Holley Fain in 2015
- Born: August 28, 1981 (age 45); Leawood, Kansas, U.S.
- Occupation: Actress
- Years active: 2004–present

Holley Fain (born August 28, 1981) is an American actress, known for her roles as Dr. Julia Canner on the ABC medical drama series Grey's Anatomy, and Maureen van der Bilt on The CW's teen drama Gossip Girl. She is also known for portraying Daphne Stillington and Ruth Kelly in the Broadway productions of Present Laughter and Harvey, respectively.

== Career ==
After graduating in acting from the University of Illinois at Urbana-Champaign, Fain debuted on the Broadway stage in 2010 in Roundabout Theatre Company's revival of Present Laughter. On television, she is known for her role as Maureen van der Bilt on Gossip Girl and as Dr. Julia Canner on Grey's Anatomy.

Fain has also appeared on television series such as 3 lbs, Lipstick Jungle, Law & Order: Criminal Intent, The Good Wife, Memphis Beat and The Mentalist. Her film credits include Blinders, One Night and Forgetting the Girl. In 2015, she was cast in the pilot episode of ABC's crime drama series Wicked City, portraying the role of Trish Roth.

== Filmography ==
Film and television
Year	Title	Role	Notes
2006	3 lbs	Rachel	Episode: "Bad Boys"
2007	Law & Order: Criminal Intent	Stacey	Episode: "Smile"
2007	One Night	Emily	
2009	Lipstick Jungle	Angie Wilson	Episode: "Chapter 19: Lovers' Leaps"
2009	Gossip Girl	Maureen van der Bilt	6 episodes
2010	The Good Wife	Shaina Whitmore	Episode: "Unplugged"
2010	Law & Order: Criminal Intent	Angela Caldera	Episode: "True Legacy"
2010	Memphis Beat	Miss Austin	Episode: "Suspicious Minds"
2011	The Mentalist	Francine Trent	Episode: "Bloodstream"
2011	Childrens Hospital	Intern	Episode: "Munch by Proxy"
2011–12	Grey's Anatomy	Dr. Julia Canner	5 episodes
2012	The Frontier	Joanna Hale	Unaired pilot
2012	Forgetting the Girl	Denise Gilcrest	Film
2013	Monday Mornings	Kara Bishop	Episode: "One Fine Day"
2013	Drop Dead Diva	Wendy Berg	Episode: "Back from the Dead"
2013	CSI: Crime Scene Investigation	Nadine Bradley	Episode: "Last Supper"
2013	NCIS	Audrey Daly	Episode: "Homesick"
2015	The Astronaut Wives Club	Marilyn Lovell	3 episodes
2016	Major Crimes	Claire Branson	Episode: "Tourist Trap"
2018	Elements of Matter	Lilly Kent	Film
2019, 2022	Undone	Geraldine	Recurring role
2020	Dirty John	Evelyn Crowley	Podcast, 8 episodes
2023	Fatal Attraction	Julia Tomlinson	5 episodes
2023	I Think You Should Leave with Tim Robinson	Herself	Episode: "Don't Just Say 'Relax', Actually Relax."
2025	Haunted Hotel	Amber, various voices	Episode: "How to Train Your Demon"

== Stage ==
Year	Title	Role	Notes
2004	The Glass Menagerie	Laura Wingfield	Texas Shakespeare Festival
2004	The Rivals	Julia Melville	Texas Shakespeare Festival
2004	The Merchant of Venice	Nerissa	Texas Shakespeare Festival
2005	As You Like It	Phoebe	North Carolina Shakespeare Festival
2005	Julius Caesar	Soothsayer	North Carolina Shakespeare Festival
2005	The Merry Wives of Windsor	Anne Page	New Jersey Shakespeare Festival
2006	Measure for Measure	Juliet	Pearl Theatre, New York City
2006	Frank's Home	Helen Girvin	Goodman Theatre, Chicago
2007	Frank's Home	Helen Girvin	Playwrights Horizons, Off-Broadway
2007	Present Laughter	Daphne Stillington	Huntington Theatre Company, Boston
2010	Present Laughter	Daphne Stillington	Broadway
2012	Harvey	Ruth Kelly	Broadway
2014	June Moon	Eileen Fletcher	Williamstown Theatre Festival
2019	The Ferryman	Caitlin Carney	Broadway
