= Steven J. DeBoy Sr. =

American politician

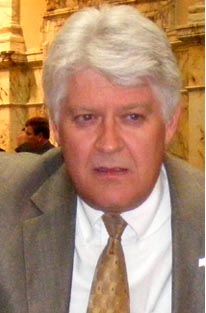
- Steven J. DeBoy Sr. In 2008

Member of the Maryland House of Delegates from the 12A district
- In office January 8, 2003 – January 14, 2015 Serving with James E. Malone Jr.
- Preceded by: Donald E. Murphy
- Succeeded by: Eric Ebersole; Terri Hill; Clarence Lam

Personal details
- Born: January 2, 1956 (age 70) Baltimore, Maryland, U.S.
- Party: Democratic
- Spouse: Jennifer A. DeBoy
- Children: 3
- Education: Catonsville Community College (AA); University of Baltimore (BA)
- Occupation: Police officer

Steven J. DeBoy Sr. (born January 2, 1956) is an American politician and retired police officer from Maryland and a member of the Democratic Party. He served in the Maryland House of Delegates, representing District 12A from 2003 to 2015. After leaving the House of Delegates, he was a Deputy Legislative Officer for Governor Larry Hogan from 2015 to 2016.

== Background ==
Deboy graduated from the Baltimore County Police Academy in 1977. He holds a bachelor's degree in political science from the University of Baltimore, and an associate degree in Criminal Justice from Catonsville Community College. He served as a Baltimore County police officer and detective for 20 years, as the senior legislative assistant, to Baltimore County Councilman S.G. Samuel Moxley, and as a special investigator for the Howard County Police Department.

== In the legislature ==
Delegate DeBoy has served on the Appropriations Committee, the Health and Human resources subcommittee, the oversight committee on personnel, the education subcommittee for the Baltimore County Delegation, and was the Vice-Chair for the Baltimore County Delegation in 2005. He is a member of the Maryland Veterans Caucus, the Task Force on the Exemption of Law Enforcement Officers' Pensions from Taxation.

=== Legislative notes ===
- voted for slots in 2005 (HB1361)
- voted for the Healthy Air Act in 2006(SB154)
- voted for the Clean Indoor Air Act of 2007 (HB359)
- voted in favor of increasing the sales tax whilst simultaneously reducing income tax rates for some income brackets – Tax Reform Act of 2007(HB2)
- voted for the Maryland Gang Prosecution Act of 2007 (HB713), subjecting gang members to up to 20 years in prison and/or a fine of up to $100,000
- voted for Jessica's Law (HB 930), eliminating parole for the most violent child sexual predators and creating a mandatory minimum sentence of 25 years in state prison, 2007
- voted for Public Safety – Statewide DNA Database System – Crimes of Violence and Burglary – Post conviction (HB 370), helping to give police officers and prosecutors greater resources to solve crimes and eliminating a backlog of 24,000 unanalyzed DNA samples, leading to 192 arrests, 2008
- voted for Vehicle Laws – Repeated Drunk and Drugged Driving Offenses – Suspension of License (HB 293), strengthening Maryland's drunk driving laws by imposing a mandatory one year license suspension for a person convicted of drunk driving more than once in five years, 2009
- voted for HB 102, creating the House Emergency Medical Services System Workgroup, leading to Maryland's budgeting of $52 million to fund three new Medevac helicopters to replace the State's aging fleet, 2009

For the past four years, Delegate DeBoy has annually voted to support classroom teachers, public schools, police and hospitals in Baltimore and Howard Counties. Since 2002, funding to schools across the State has increased 82%, resulting in Maryland being ranked top in the nation for K-12 education.

== Election results ==
- 1998 Race for Maryland House of Delegates – District 12A

Voters to choose two:

Name	Votes	Percent	Outcome
James E. Malone Jr., Dem.	13,222	31%	Won
Donald E. Murphy, Rep.	10,920	26%	Won
Steven J. DeBoy Sr., Dem.	10,669	25%	Lost
Loyd V. Smith, Rep.	7,245	17%	Lost

== Family ==
He is the son of Donald DeBoy and grandson of the late Ferdinand DeBoy (1904–1973) and Hazel Winslow DeBoy (1907–1996). He is a second cousin of actors PJ DeBoy and Paul DeBoy, both of whom (like Delegate DeBoy) hail from the Farrell-DeBoy family of Baltimore, Maryland (PJ Is the grandson of the late James J. DeBoy Sr., a brother of Ferdinand DeBoy.).
