= Locker Room (TV series) =

- Genre: sports
- Directed by: Josh Levy
- Presented by: Paul DeBoy
- Country of origin: Canada

Production
- Executive producer: Josh Levy
- Producers: Robi Levy; Paul Bellini
- Production locations: Toronto, Ontario

Original release
- Network: PrideVision
- Release: January 25, 2002 – 2005

Locker Room is a Canadian television series, which aired on PrideVision from 2002 to 2005. A magazine series about LGBT issues and topics in sports, it was billed as the world's first LGBT-themed sports series.

Hosted by Paul DeBoy, the series also featured contributions from Paul Bellini, Nina Arsenault, and Jason Ruta.
