= Nate Taylor =

American film director

- Born: Nathan Bauman Taylor; January 21, 1976 (age 50); Hanover, New Hampshire, United States
- Occupations: Film director, film editor, film producer
- Years active: 2003–present
- Notable work: Forgetting the Girl, "MMOvie"

Nate Taylor is an American filmmaker based in New York City. Taylor is son of documentary director Eric Taylor and contemporary artist Sali Taylor.

== Career ==
Nathan Bauman Taylor began his professional film career as a production assistant at the age of sixteen. Over the next six years he worked a variety of roles on-set, ranging from extra to dolly grip, until he ended up landing a job at the NYC-based commercial post-production house Crew Cuts. He remained at Crew Cuts for 12 years, where he edited numerous national television commercials for the likes of Pepsi, Verizon, GE and Saturday Night Live. In addition to a large body of commercial work, Taylor has edited a number of long form pieces, including music videos, short films, and worked on the independent feature, Kissing Jessica Stein (directed by Charlie Herman-Wurmfeld).

Showcasing the film-making talents he refined while working in post-production, Taylor started directing short works in 2003, including viral web videos, spec commercials, indie music videos, and a short film. In 2008 he directed a machinima parody entitled MMOvie. Created using the World of Warcraft game engine the short was a massive online success, garnering over 3 million hits internationally and receiving nominations for a 2008 Webby Award and a Golden Trailer Award. The project also got the notice of Austria filmmaker Daniel Moshel, who featured Taylor and his team in a documentary about the virtual world titled Login 2 Life.

In 2012 Taylor completed his first full-length feature film, Forgetting the Girl, an adaptation of a short story of the same title written by Peter Moore Smith. On March 2, it had its world premiere at the 2012 Cinequest film festival. Critics praised Taylor for showing "great skill and confidence in the direction" and delivering a film which was "twisted and brilliant" and "disturbingly beautiful". The film will be distributed in North America by Film Movement in October 2013.

== Video art ==
Taylor is also a VJ performing under the name Full Stealth. As VJ Full Stealth he performs live, improvisational video art with bands and DJs. His largest show was a nine-hour set in the House Tent at the 2007 [Ultra Music Festival] in Miami, Florida.
