= Paul DeBoy =

American actor (born 1955)

- Born: September 14, 1955 (age 70); Baltimore, Maryland, U.S.
- Education: American Academy of Dramatic Arts (AA)
- Relatives: PJ DeBoy (cousin); Steven J. DeBoy Sr. (cousin)

Paul DeBoy (born September 14, 1955) is an American actor. He is best known for appearances in A Dirty Shame as Wendell Doggett, Red Dead Redemption as Jimmy Saint, Haber as Bernhard Moritz and for episodes of Law & Order and Law & Order: Trial by Jury.

== Early life and education ==
DeBoy was born in Baltimore, Maryland. He earned an associate of arts degree from the American Academy of Dramatic Arts and attended the Royal Academy of Arts.

== Career ==
DeBoy played Harry Bright in the North American Tour of Mamma Mia!. He covered two roles in the Second Stage Theater's production of Eurydice by Sarah Ruhl. He has a long history in regional theatre, including Clean House at Cincinnati Playhouse in the Park; Heartbreak House at The Repertory Theatre of St. Louis; The Real Thing at Pioneer Theatre Company; Sight Unseen at Manhattan Theatre Club; Sylvia at Cleveland Play House; ...Young Lady From Rwanda at Kansas City Repertory Theatre; The Swan at American Stage; Cat on A Hot Tin Roof at Shea's 710 Theatre; Blithe Spirit at the Olney Theatre Center; and The Einstein Project at Theatre for The First Amendment.

== Personal life ==
DeBoy is a cousin of actor PJ DeBoy and politician Steven J. DeBoy Sr.

== Filmography ==
=== Film ===
Year	Title	Role	Notes
2004	A Dirty Shame	Wendell Doggett	

=== Television ===
Year	Title	Role	Notes
1992	Literary Visions	Actor	2 episodes
1999–2009	Law & Order	Various roles	4 episodes
2002	Locker Room	Self	12 episodes; also composer
2005	Law & Order: Trial by Jury	Steven Leone	Episode: "Pattern of Conduct"
2008	Law & Order: Criminal Intent	Elliot Falls	Episode: "Contract"
2013	The Following	Homeland Officer	Episode: "Love Hurts"
2013	Royal Pains	Eugene Sims	Episode: "Can of Worms"
2016	Law & Order: SVU	Bill Sullivan	Episode: "Imposter"
2017	The Blacklist: Redemption	Frank Phelps	Episode: "Operation Davenport"
2020	Hunters	CIA Official	Episode: "Eilu v' Eilu"
2021	The Good Fight	Bob the Fracking King	Episode: "And the Two Partners Had a Fight..."
2022	The Marvelous Mrs. Maisel	Herman	Episode: "Billy Jones and the Orgy Lamps"

=== Video games ===
Year	Title	Role
2010	Red Dead Redemption	Jimmy Saint
2010	Undead Nightmare	Jimmy Saint
