= In Living Cover =

Studio album by Jay Brannan
- Released: June 23, 2009
- Genre: Folk, acoustic
- Length: 29:17
- Label: Great Depression, Nettwerk (#30869)
- Producer: Jay Brannan, Drew Brody

Jay Brannan chronology
Goddamned (2008)	In Living Cover (2009)	Rob Me Blind (2012)

Professional ratings
Aggregate scores
Source	Rating
Metacritic	48/100
Review scores
Source	Rating
Allmusic	2.5/5 stars
PopMatters	6/10 stars

In Living Cover is the second studio album by American singer-songwriter Jay Brannan, released in the United States on June 23, 2009. The album features seven cover songs and two originals. The album reached number ten on the Billboard Top Heatseekers chart for the week of July 25, 2009. Allmusic critic Andrew Leahey gave the album a mixed rating, stating the album's "highlights spread too thinly to do much good" and PopMatters critic Jer Fairall called the album a "satisfying collection" with "a couple of bum notes".

== Track listing ==
1. "Beautifully" (Jay Brannan) - 3:14
2. "Say It's Possible" (Terra Naomi) - 3:25
3. "All I Want" (Joni Mitchell) - 4:06
4. "Blowin' in the Wind" (Bob Dylan) - 2:02
5. "The Freshmen" (The Verve Pipe) - 4:16
6. "Good Mother" (Jann Arden) - 3:10
7. "Both Hands" (Ani Difranco) - 1:27
8. "Zombie" (The Cranberries) - 3:12
9. "Drowning" (Jay Brannan) - 4:25

== Personnel ==
- Jay Brannan - singing, guitar, bass, kashaka, and piano (except "drowning")
- Greg Heffernan - cello
- Scott Starrett - piano arrangement for "Drowning"
- Drew Brody - production, mixing, and recording
- Mark Chalecki - mastering
- Pedro Fanti and Beatriz Milhomem - album artwork
- M. Clark - photography
