= Lindsay Beamish =

American actress and professor

- Occupation: Actress

Lindsay Beamish is an American actress and professor, best known for her roles as Severin in Shortbus and Jamie in Forgetting the Girl. As of 2015, she teaches at Emerson College and graduated from UC Santa Cruz.

== Early life ==
Beamish was born and raised in Los Angeles.

== Career ==
Beamish began acting early, starring in TV movies as a child during the 1980s, before finding series work on television in the 2000s, making appearances on CSI, Gilmore Girls, and Six Feet Under.

From the late 1990s to the mid 2000s, Beamish starred in Miranda July's Nest of Tens.

Her role in Shortbus was praised by David Ansen in Newsweek, who said "Beamish's conflicted dominatrix stands out for her understatement, she understands nuance and stillness." Beamish was nominated for a Gotham Award and made appearances at the Cannes International Film Festival, Toronto International Film Festival, Chicago International Film Festival, and the Bergen International Film Festival.

In 2013, Beamish starred in Nate Taylor's Forgetting the Girl, her performance praised by David DeWitt in The New York Times. While attending grad school at UC Davis, Beamish devised, directed and starred in the multi-media performance 38 1/2, and Wigs, created with and co-starring Amanda Vitiello. In 2018, she starred in the Apollinaire Theater Company's production of Roland Schimmelpfennig's Winter Solstice. In 2019, Beamish and Vanessa Peters wrote, directed and starred in the award-winning The Institute for the Opposite of Longing, which ran for multiple dates in Boston and Los Angeles.
