= Shortbus =

2006 film by John Cameron Mitchell

- Theatrical release poster
- Directed by: John Cameron Mitchell
- Written by: John Cameron Mitchell
- Produced by: Howard Gertler; John Cameron Mitchell; Tim Perell; Alexis Fish
- Starring: Sook-Yin Lee; Paul Dawson; Lindsay Beamish; PJ DeBoy; Raphael A. Barker; Peter Stickles; Jay Brannan
- Cinematography: Frank G. DeMarco
- Edited by: Brian A. Kates
- Music by: Yo La Tengo
- Production companies: Fortissimo Films; Q Television
- Distributed by: THINKFilm
- Release dates: May 20, 2006 (Cannes); October 20, 2006 (Canada)
- Running time: 101 minutes
- Country: United States
- Language: English
- Budget: $2 million
- Box office: $5.4 million

Shortbus is a 2006 American erotic comedy-drama film written and directed by John Cameron Mitchell. The plot revolves around a sexually diverse ensemble of colorful characters trying desperately to connect in an early 2000s New York City. The characters converge in a weekly Brooklyn artistic/sexual salon loosely inspired by various underground NYC gatherings that took place in the early 2000s. According to Mitchell, the film attempts to "employ sex in new cinematic ways because it's too interesting to leave to porn." Shortbus includes a variety of explicit scenes containing non-simulated sexual intercourse with visible penetration and male ejaculation.

== Plot ==
In New York City, Sofia Lin, a couples counselor/sex therapist, is married to the handsome but unambitious and slightly dim-witted Rob. She comes into contact with a couple: slightly egotistical former child star Jamie and former sex worker James, the film's other lead character. At the outset, James suggests to his boyfriend that they open up their relationship to have sex with others. During their first consultation, Sofia snaps, slaps Jamie, and then apologetically reveals her "pre-orgasmic" status. The couple suggests she attend a weekly social/artistic/sexual salon in Brooklyn called "Shortbus", which is hosted by drag artist Justin Bond. Sofia slowly opens up to new experiences; this includes a friendship with a dominatrix who goes by the name Severin. Sofia's inability to achieve orgasm begins to cause conflict with Rob, who in turn begins attending Shortbus with Sofia.

James and Jamie meet a young ex-model and aspiring singer named Ceth (pronounced "Seth") and the three begin a sexual relationship. Meanwhile, James and Jamie's life is being closely watched by their across-the-street stalker neighbor, Caleb. Caleb fears the inclusion of Ceth in James and Jamie's relationship might break them up and thus destroy his ability to live vicariously through them, so he attends Shortbus, where he confronts Ceth. Sofia begins to go daily to a spa with a sensory deprivation tank to meet with Severin, and the two begin to have intense conversations. Severin begins to help Sofia loosen up sexually; Sofia helps Severin achieve a deeper human connection than she had experienced before. One evening at Shortbus, Severin discusses with Sofia the idea of giving up sex work to pursue her dream of being an artist. The two then have an unplanned sexual experience, and once again Sofia is left unsatisfied.

Throughout the film, James is seen making a film about himself and his relationship. It turns out to be a suicide note. He attempts to take his own life and is rescued by Caleb, who calls for help, but is too embarrassed to wait with James for the help to arrive. He writes his phone number and email address on James' face while he is unconscious. When James wakes in the hospital, he calls Caleb. James goes to Caleb's home to be consoled, but does not contact Jamie or Ceth, neither of whom can understand why he would not call them or come home.

An interlocking trio of scenes shows connections between the characters' emotional problems and their sexual lives. At Caleb's house, he and James have sex, and James allows Caleb to penetrate him, something he has never allowed anyone to do before. Afterward, in a dramatic revelation, James is seen in the window of Caleb's apartment by Jamie, who realizes in that moment that James is alive and okay. Rob and Severin have a paid encounter where Rob asks to be flogged, something he could not ask Sofia to do. As this progresses, Severin loses control and Rob tries to comfort her. Sofia seems to have a dream of struggling through an overgrown, wild forested area to a gentle seashore where she tries to achieve orgasm again. On failing, she screams, and in the real world the lights go off across the city, seemingly caused by the simultaneous and collective frustration of the characters.

The film ends with a song by Justin Bond at Shortbus during the blackout. Sofia arrives and finds Rob with Severin and after acknowledging him sits down by herself. James and Jamie also arrive followed by Ceth and Caleb. Justin's song starts on a wistful note, but as it progresses it becomes more energetic and positive thanks to the arrival of the Hungry March Band. Jamie and James make out on the floor, and Ceth and Caleb start to hit it off. Rob starts kissing another patron, and Severin progresses from nervous anxiety to happy elation upon the arrival of the band. Sofia engages in a threesome with a couple (Nick and Leah) she has seen several times before and who appear to meet her prerequisite of "just beginning to experiment sexually". Sofia finally achieves an orgasm as the blackout ends and power returns to New York.

== Cast ==
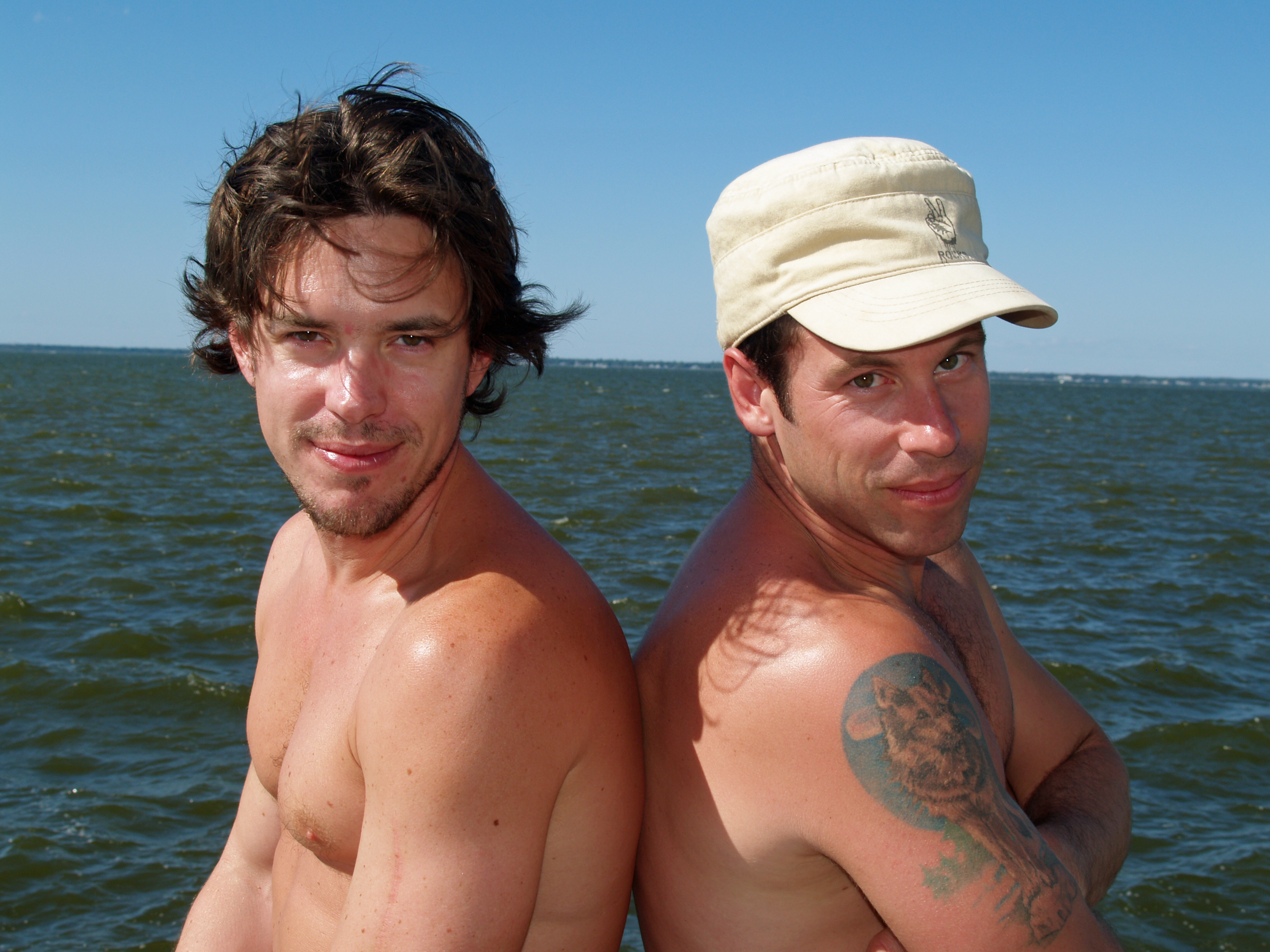
Paul Dawson and PJ DeBoy

- Sook-Yin Lee as Sofia Lin
- Paul Dawson as James
- Lindsay Beamish as Severin
- PJ DeBoy as Jamie
- Raphael A. Barker as Rob
- Peter Stickles as Caleb
- Jay Brannan as Ceth
- Alan Mandell as Mayor Tobias
- Jan Hilmer and Shanti Carson as Nick and Leah
- Justin Vivian Bond as vself / Mistress of Shortbus
- The Hungry March Band as Themselves

=== Cameo appearances ===
- Director/writer Mitchell is featured in two shots in the Sex-Not-Bombs Room: the first, kissing a dark-haired man; and the second, performing cunnilingus on a woman sitting on a couch.
- Jonathan Caouette, director of Tarnation, as the man who steals some "blondies" off a plate in the Sex-Not-Bombs Room. Mitchell met him when Caouette auditioned for Shortbus and subsequently became executive producer of Tarnation.
- Mary Beth Peil as the woman with her hand down the storm drain (Severin takes a Polaroid of her).
- Singer-songwriter Reginald Vermue (aka Gentleman Reg) has a song on the soundtrack and appears as "The Albino"
- Tristan Taormino, a sex columnist and porn film director/occasional actress, is one of the participants in the orgy sequence.
- Comedian Bradford Scobie (Doctor Donut)
- Singer-songwriter Jasper James, who also appears on the soundtrack, has a cameo as the woman on whom Mitchell is performing oral sex (on the couch next to Rob).
- Comedian/bon vivant Murray Hill (on the swing)
- Acrobat-comedians The Wau Wau Sisters (on the trapeze)
- Miss Exotic World 2004 Dirty Martini (doing the strip tease)
- Burlesque star The World-Famous *Bob* (sitting with the Mayor in the Truth-Or-Dare Room)
- Ray Rivas, like his character Shabbos goy, was known for his blood-inclusive brand of extreme performance art which he performed at DUMBA.
- Bitch, of the bands Bitch and Animal and "Bitch and the Exciting Conclusion", plays herself.
- Daniel Sea, queercore musician and former circus juggler of Cypher in the Snow and cast member of The L Word, plays themselves as Little Prince, their Radical Faerie nickname.
- JD Samson of the band Le Tigre (who actually played their first show in DUMBA) appears in the "Bitch's Bedroom" scene.
- Justin Tranter, lead singer of the band Semi Precious Weapons, is a spectator in Shortbus.

== Production ==
The audition website elicited half a million hits and 500 audition tape submissions. Forty people were called in for improv auditions and nine actors were cast, all before there was any story in mind. The film's characters and story were created collaboratively over two and a half years through improvisation workshops with the cast. Mitchell wrote the screenplay from the raw material generated by the workshops and rehearsals.

Much of the sex in the film is unsimulated. Mitchell says:

In the old days, when you couldn't show sex on film, directors like Hitchcock had metaphors for sex (trains going into tunnels, etc). When you can show more realistic sex, the sex itself can be a metaphor for other parts of the character's lives. The way people express themselves sexually can tell you a lot about who they are. Some people ask me, 'Couldn't you have told the same story without the explicitness?'. They don't ask whether I could've done Hedwig without the songs. Why not be allowed to use every paint in the paintbox?

As indicated in the DVD special features, Sook-Yin Lee and Shanti Carson each suggested they be filmed having real orgasms rather than fake them, specifically for the final scene involving Lee and the orgy sequence involving Carson. Mitchell also participated in the latter scene, performing oral sex on a woman for the first time "as a gesture of solidarity".

The panoramic cityscape interspersed through the film was completely computer-generated and designed by John Bair.

In the opening sequence in which Sook-Yin Lee and Raphael Barker are engaged in a session of unsimulated vaginal intercourse, Lee wore a female condom. "They wanted to make sure it was safe sex, and it would look weird if my husband was wearing a condom," Lee explained.

Sook-Yin Lee said she had a boyfriend at the time of filming. She revealed he was "very supportive" regarding her real sex scenes with her "dear friend" Raphael Barker.

Mitchell said one of the things he wanted to depict in the film was a growing sense of disconnect between people due to the rise of digital culture. Of one of the film's opening scenes where the character James cries immediately after masturbating alone on camera, Mitchell commented, "That, to me, is the strongest metaphor for how sad and lonely today's digital culture is."

=== Inspiration ===
The characters all converge on a weekly underground gathering or salon called Shortbus, inspired by the short yellow school buses for "challenged" students. The Shortbus salon was loosely based on a series of New York social/artistic/sexual gatherings. One was the monthly "Shortbus Sweaty Teenage Dance Party" organized by Mitchell (2002) as "DJ Dear Tic", his Radical Faerie nickname (Mitchell was influenced by annual Radical Faerie counter-cultural gatherings in Tennessee and New Orleans). Other influences include the Lusty Loft Parties that took place at a Brooklyn art collective called DUMBA (where the film's salon was actually shot), and the weekly CineSalon film gathering, both of which were organized, in part, by Stephen Kent Jusick who plays Creamy in the film. The still-running underground Rubulad party was also an inspiration.

== Release ==
The film premiered at the 2006 Cannes Film Festival, where it was received warmly with a standing ovation from audiences and strong interest from North American distributors, despite its explicit content. The film was ultimately picked up by THINKFilm, who released it in North America on October 13, 2006. The film was also released in over 25 countries, winning multiple awards at the Athens, Zurich, and Gijón film festivals. Howard Gertler and Tim Perell received an Independent Spirit Award as Producers of the Year.

=== Critical reception ===
Shortbus received mixed to positive reviews, currently holding a 68% positive score on Rotten Tomatoes based on 127 reviews with an average rating of 6.50/10. The consensus states: "The sex may be explicit, but Mitchell integrates it into the characters' lives and serves the whole story up with a generous dose of sweetness and wit." The film also has a score of 64 out of 100 on Metacritic based on 27 reviews.

Peter Travers from Rolling Stone commented "If there is such a thing as hard-core with a soft heart, this is it."

Writing for RogerEbert.com, Jim Emerson said, "the characters in Shortbus focus on sex as a way of getting through to each other, and getting in touch with themselves. It's a gleefully randy romantic roundelay, in the tradition of Max Ophuls' serially sexual French comedy La Ronde (1950). Polymorphously pornographic, sure; but it doesn't feel the slightest bit obscene. And that's a neat trick." He concluded, "And by the time Justin Bond's bullhorn baritone croons 'Everybody Gets It In the End', the thin characterizations and soapy sitcom plot contrivances melt away in a cleansing, melancholy humor, and you notice that something quite magical and moving -- and healing -- is taking place, for real, right before your eyes."

In a 2016 retrospective for the film's 10th anniversary, Hayden Manders of Nylon wrote, "Today...the movie's optimism and shamelessness feel as progressive as it does provocative. Since then, there hasn't been a movie that celebrates the body, and the joys and the ickiness of sex. What's more, it's a story about New York that's hardly told. (And New York stories are ultimately about all of us.) This one isn't glamorized or satirized. It seeks to harmonize."

=== Public reaction ===
Some have branded the film "pornographic". In response, Mitchell said, "I define -- and most people do -- pornography as devoid of artistic intent. The purpose of pornography is to arouse. I don't think anyone got [sexually aroused] watching this film", and argued that the sex in Shortbus is often purposefully "de-eroticized". He added, "We keep reminding people it's not pornographic — it's not a film that's meant to arouse. We try to de-eroticize the sex to see what kind of emotions and ideas are left over when the haze of eroticism is waved away." In addition, Mitchell said, "There is a certain provocation we had in mind with this film, but more important than that, we wanted to use sex as a metaphor for things that were, perhaps, universal, themes like connection and love and fear. We just thought the language of sex could be used the way the language of music could be used in a musical."

Due to her participation in several unsimulated sex scenes in the film, Sook-Yin Lee was nearly fired by the Canadian Broadcasting Corporation, for which she hosted the radio program Definitely Not the Opera at the time. Ultimately, she retained her job as the CBC relented in the face of support for Lee from the public, as well as from celebrities such as Gus Van Sant, Atom Egoyan, David Cronenberg, Francis Ford Coppola, Michael Stipe, Moby, Julianne Moore and Yoko Ono.

The Korea Media Rating Board banned the film from public screenings in South Korea in 2007 for its sex scenes and gay content, although it still screened at film festivals not subject to the Board's authority. Sponge ENT, the film's South Korean distributor, filed suit and in 2009, the Supreme Court of Korea ordered the ban lifted, declaring the national film censorship law unconstitutional for its ambiguity.

=== Re-release ===
In 2022, Oscilloscope Laboratories rereleased Shortbus as a 4K restoration for the film's 15th anniversary. The restoration was screened at New York's IFC Center on January 26, 2022, and was later rolled out theatrically throughout the year.

=== Home media ===
The film was released to DVD in North America on March 13, 2007. The DVD features a comprehensive documentary, "Gifted and Challenged: the Making of Shortbus" (Director/producer M. Sean Kaminsky), the vérité-style "How to Shoot Sex: A Docu-Primer", deleted scenes (including a dropped subplot about a character who is the Bush twins' personal assistant), as well as a filmmaker/cast audio commentary. The film was released on Blu-ray in Germany on October 28, 2011. On August 2, 2022, the 4K remaster of Shortbus was released on Blu-ray and DVD from Oscilloscope.

Coinciding with the 15th anniversary, the film was made available as an online rental for the first time on all VOD platforms except for Amazon Prime, who rejected the film five times with the reasoning that the "captions are out of sync” and that the film contains “offensive content." Critics noted other films that feature scenes of unsimulated sex, such as Lars von Trier's Nymphomaniac and Vincent Gallo's The Brown Bunny, have both been made available to rent on Prime's service. In response, Oscilloscope president Dan Berger stated, “There's no shortage of dicks readily available on Amazon, and apparently, there are plenty behind the scenes too. The prudishness and utter hypocrisy of refusing to carry this film — one that is the height of healthy representation, inclusiveness, and support for a community often persecuted — only further perpetuates abuse and they should be ashamed." Oscilloscope encouraged viewers to seek the film out on other VOD platforms besides Amazon Prime.

== Soundtrack ==
The soundtrack was released on Conor Oberst's record label, Team Love, on November 7, 2006. Mitchell directed the music video for Bright Eyes' "First Day of My Life" (which featured Shortbus cast members Bitch, Daniela Sea, and Ray Rivas). The soundtrack was released in Europe on V2 with the Anita O'Day song replaced by "What Matters to Me" by Tiebreaker (John LaMonica).

1. Scott Matthew – "Upside Down"
2. Azure Ray – "If You Fall"
3. Yo La Tengo – "Wizard's Sleeve"
4. Animal Collective – "Winter's Love"
5. Scott Matthew – "Surgery"
6. Lee & Leblanc (with Sook-Yin Lee) – "Beautiful"
7. Gentleman Reg – "It's Not Safe"
8. John LaMonica – "Kids"
9. Scott Matthew – "Language"
10. Jay Brannan – "Soda Shop"
11. Anita O'Day – "Is You Is or Is You Ain't My Baby"
12. The Ark – "Kolla Kolla (Nationalteatern Tribute Version)"
13. Jasper James and the Jetset – "This House"
14. The Ark – "This Piece of Poetry Is Meant to Do Harm"
15. The Hidden Cameras – "Boys of Melody"
16. Scott Matthew – "Little Bird"
17. Justin Bond and the Hungry March Band – "In the End (Long Film Version)"
18. Scott Matthew – "In the End (Acoustic)"
