= Goddamned (album) =

Studio album by Jay Brannan
- Released: July 1, 2008
- Label: Great Depression, Nettwerk (#30808)
- Producer: Will Golden

Jay Brannan chronology
Unmastered (2007)	Goddamned (2008)	In Living Cover (2009)

Goddamned is the debut studio album by American singer–songwriter Jay Brannan, released in the United States on July 1, 2008, and in the UK on August 25. The album features eleven original songs; a bonus track is included by purchase via iTunes.

== Track listing ==
1. "Can't Have It All"
2. "Half-Boyfriend"
3. "American Idol"
4. "A Death Waltz"
5. "At First Sight"
6. "Housewife"
7. "Goddamned"
8. "Home"
9. "Bowlegged & Starving"
10. "On All Fours"
11. "String-A-Long Song"
12. "Ever After Happily" (iTunes bonus track)

== Critical reception ==
Professional ratings
Review scores
Source	Rating
PopMatters	5/10 stars
Slant Magazine	1.5/5 stars

Jer Fairall of PopMatters gave the album a mixed review, stating "with likeability to spare, Brannan's music nevertheless needs to grow up a bit". Dave Hughes of Slant Magazine gave a negative review, stating "Brannan is a talented and tenacious guy, it's also impossible to recommend Goddamned".

== Personnel ==
- Jay Brannan - singing, guitar, piano and organ (for "Bowlegged & Starving")
- Oliver Kraus - cello
- Jon Flaugher - double bass
- Bitch - violin
- Michael Moore - drums and percussion
- Fil Krohnengold - piano and organ
- Will Golden, Mike Terry, Jared Nugent - engineering
- Bryan Cook - mixing
- Mark Chalecki - mastering
- Christie Little - package design
