= Paul Dawson (actor) =

American actor

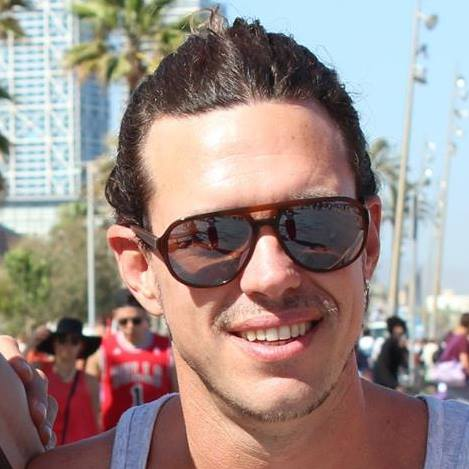
- Dawson in 2015
- Occupation: Actor
- Years active: 1998–present
- Partner: PJ DeBoy

Paul Dawson is an American actor. He is best known for his performance as suicidal former prostitute James in the 2006 comedy-drama film Shortbus, written and directed by John Cameron Mitchell.

== Career ==
=== Shortbus ===
The film Shortbus is noted for its explicit depiction of sexuality, and, though Dawson is featured in one of the film's most graphic scenes, it was his portrayal of depression that garnered the critics' attention. "Dawson's James haunts," said David Ansen of Newsweek, "the bitter taste of his despair feels real".

=== Other film credits ===
In 1999, Dawson played Tar in The Blur of Insanity, an underground comedy written and directed by John Hussar about partying and drug use in college. The following year, he played a bellboy in The Big Kahuna, which starred Kevin Spacey and Danny DeVito. Also in 2000, Dawson appeared as the Bloodied Man in Urbania, an independent drama based on the play Urban Folk Tales. Urbania premiered at the 2000 Sundance Film Festival and was seen at a number of LGBT film festivals. That same year Dawson played a hustler in The Mountain King, a short film included in the 2001 LGBT-themed anthology Boys to Men.

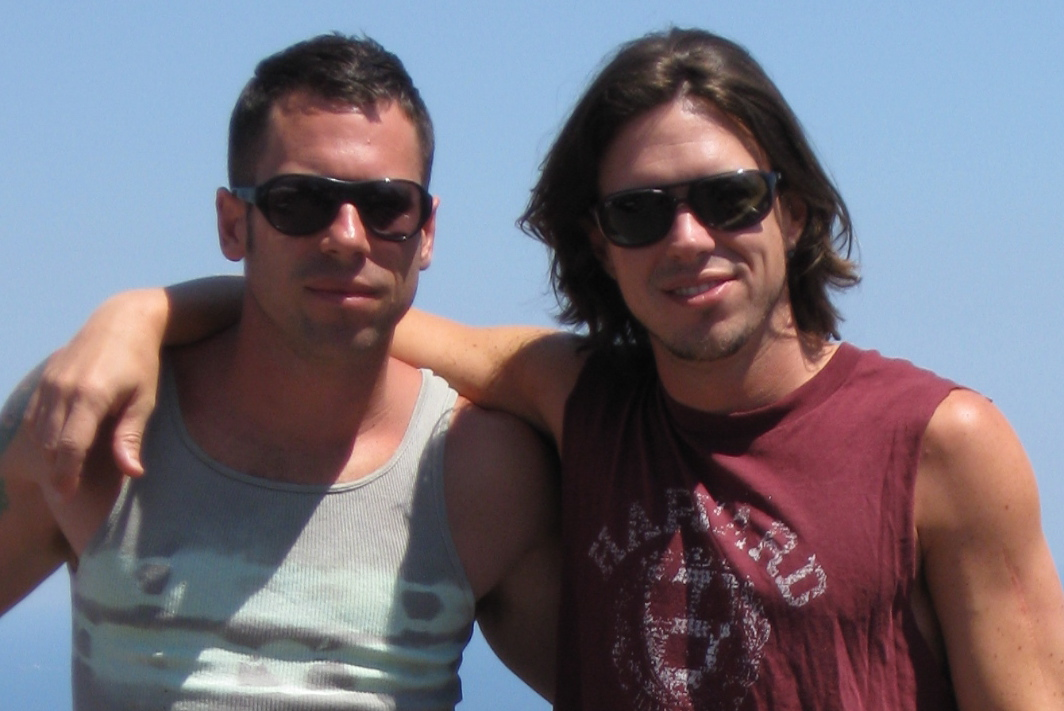
Dawson (right) with PJ DeBoy

=== Television credits ===
In 1999, Dawson appeared in the pilot episode of Strangers with Candy, "Old Habits – New Beginnings," and was also featured as "Derek Harland" in the Law & Order episode "Hate".

=== "Mattachine" ===
Dawson is the graphic designer and a disc jockey for international "Mattachine" dance parties, which he co-founded in New York City in 2008.
