= PJ DeBoy =

American actor

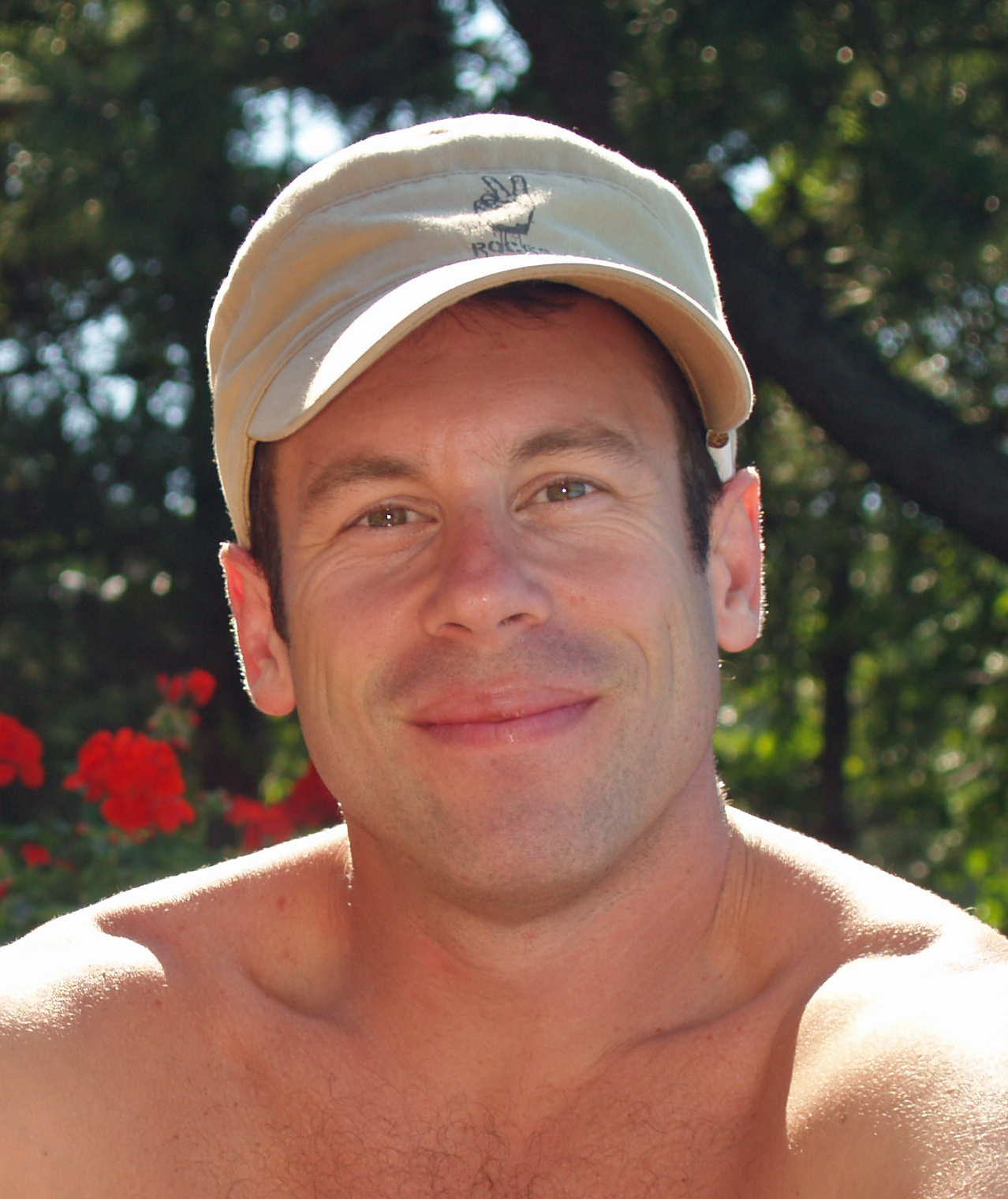
- DeBoy in August 2008
- Born: Paul J. DeBoy; June 7, 1971 (age 54); Baltimore, Maryland, U.S.
- Occupations: Actor, talk show host
- Partner: Paul Dawson

Paul J. "PJ" DeBoy (born June 7, 1971) is an American actor and talk show host.

== Early life ==
DeBoy was born in Baltimore, Maryland. He shares his name with his cousin, actor Paul DeBoy. He and Paul are cousins of Delegate Steven J. DeBoy Sr.

== Career ==
DeBoy started his career in New York, where he performed with Miss Coco Peru and Kiki and Herb. He moved to Toronto in 1998. There, he hosted the show Locker Room on PrideVision and the late-night talk show Last Call on Toronto 1, and has appeared in various feature films such as Hedwig and the Angry Inch (2001), DoUlike2watch.com (2003), and Shortbus (2006).
