= Marnie (novel) =

1961 novel by Winston Graham

- First edition UK cover
- Author: Winston Graham
- Language: English
- Genre: crime novel
- Publisher: Hodder & Stoughton
- Publication date: 1961
- Publication place: United Kingdom
- Media type: Print (hardcover)
- Pages: 286 p.

Marnie is an English crime novel, written by Winston Graham and first published in 1961. It has been adapted as a film, a stage play and an opera.

== Plot ==
Marnie is about a young woman who makes a living by embezzling her employers' funds, moving on, and changing her identity. Her criminal behaviour is described in detail, but her motives remain obscure, as she is a capable person who would have likely fared well in an honest career.

She is finally caught in the act by one of her employers, a young widower named Mark Rutland, who blackmails her into marriage. Two shocking events near the end of the story send the troubled woman to the brink of suicide, and she must eventually face the trauma from her past that is the root cause of her behaviour.

== Adaptations ==
The book was the basis for Alfred Hitchcock's suspense film Marnie (1964), in which the setting was changed from England to the United States. Details of the story were changed, as well as the ending, which was changed to have a more optimistic note. The book was also adapted into a stage play by Sean O'Connor in 2001, a radio play by John Kirkmorris in 1975 and one by Shaun McKenna in 2011. An English National Opera production of Nico Muhly’s adaptation, Marnie, with a libretto by Nicholas Wright, premiered on 18 November 2017 at the London Coliseum, with Marnie sung by Sasha Cooke. The co-production with the Metropolitan Opera had its American premiere on 19 October 2018, starring Isabel Leonard in the title role.

== Inspiration ==
In Tony Lee Moral's book Hitchcock and the Making of Marnie, Winston Graham revealed that the inspiration for Marnie came from three real-life incidents:

- His younger child's babysitter was an attractive girl who was constantly taking showers and receiving letters from her mother about the dangers of getting involved with men, and she had a strong interest in riding horses.
- A newspaper article about a woman who changed her appearance as she moved from job to job, stealing money from her employers.
- A wife with three children whose husband was away at sea slept with many sailors, became pregnant, killed the baby soon after it was born, went to trial and was acquitted by reason of temporary insanity. Soon after that, her young son started stealing things.

Although Graham never acknowledged it, inspiration almost certainly came as well from a 1960 The Twilight Zone episode called Nightmare as a Child. The main character is a woman nicknamed Markie who as a little girl witnessed her mother being murdered by a lover and, traumatised, suppressed this memory.

== Current edition ==
- Marnie (House of Stratus, 2002), ISBN 0-7551-0900-7 (hardbound reprint)
