= Rust and Bone (soundtrack) =

De rouille et d'os (Rust and Bone)

Soundtrack album by Alexandre Desplat
- Released: 15 May 2012
- Recorded: 2011–2012
- Genre: Film soundtrack
- Length: 89:22
- Label: Why Not Productions; PIAS
- Producer: Alexandre Desplat

Alexandre Desplat chronology
Reality (2012)	De rouille et d'os (Rust and Bone) (2012)	Moonrise Kingdom (2013)

Rust and Bone (French: De rouille et d'os) is the soundtrack to the 2012 film of the same name directed by Jacques Audiard. The album featured musical score composed by Alexandre Desplat and songs heard in the film, with contributions from Bon Iver, Colin Stetson, Azari, John Cooper Clarke, Django Django, Lykke Li and the B-52s amongst several others. The soundtrack was released on 15 May 2012.

== Development ==
Rust and Bone is Desplat's fourth collaboration with Audiard following Read My Lips (2001), The Beat That My Heart Skipped (2005) and A Prophet (2009). Desplat wanted the score to be more intimate than being romantic, as composing a romantic score would make the film really cheap and sentimental. He admitted on Audiard's artistic obsessions in his previous films, where the film "explore a particular social environment where there is a lot of darkness. But there's light there, too, since the characters are trying to elevate themselves and go beyond their situation. Obviously, the music is sparked by all these elements."

Desplat added that the music was further influenced by Audiard's way of editing, as the film has "very few establishing shots and a lot of extreme close-ups—it's very elliptical", hence the music had to go in another direction. He wanted to find music which would elevate and also become modest at the same time, which resulted in utilizing hymns with harmonium, cello and guitar. He did not want the music to play it too much like a score, but to recall sensations more than anything.

Desplat recalled the sequence where the main characters go by the lake, as one of his favorite moments from the film. The sequence is underlined by a gentle melody, along with the hospital sequence where he wrote a sextet for three violins and three cellos, which sounded "really, really intimate and fragile". To achieve that sound, he asked the players to play with one hair of their bow "at the edge of breaking a sound" so that it could become fragile and tender. The emotional sequence between Matthias Schoenaerts' character and his son was described as moving, where the music tries to bring the emotion without overtly melodramatic.

== Release ==
The soundtrack was released in France on 15 May 2012 which featured 28 tracks, and in the United States on 13 November. The album's international release excluded Bon Iver's "Wash." and "The Wolves (Act I and II)".

== Reception ==
Peter Bradshaw of The Guardian described it as "a conventional orchestral score by Alexandre Desplat", Peter Debruge of Variety called it as "tender" and "sparse". Lee Marshall of Screen International wrote "The soundtrack, which mixes now sombre, now more uplifting orchestral work by Alexandre Desplat with rock songs and ballads, washes over the dialogue on several occasions". Todd McCarthy of The Hollywood Reporter wrote "There is a gritty elegance to the filmmaking, while the soundtrack features a rich mix of Alexandre Desplat's original score and many song selections." Craig Skinner of HuffPost UK wrote "As the music gets louder it subtly shifts into Alexandre Desplat's beautiful and tender score for the film." A critic from the Santa Barbara Independent wrote that the film "is also blessed with smart musical textures, from Alexandre Desplat’s score to songs by Bon Iver and Goleta's own Katy Perry".

== Track listing ==
Rust and Bone (Original Motion Picture Soundtrack) track listing
No.	Title	Artist(s)	Length
1.	"Wash."	Bon Iver	4:57
2.	"Reckless (With Your Love)" (Tiga Remix)	Azari	8:03
3.	"Evidently Chickentown"	John Cooper Clarke	2:22
4.	"Love Shack"	The B-52s	5:22
5.	"I Follow Rivers" (The Magician Remix)	Lykke Li	4:41
6.	"With You"	Carte Blanche feat. Alexis Taylor	4:07
7.	"Sexy Phone Girls' Fantasies"	White & Spirit	5:23
8.	"Firewater"	Django Django	4:50
9.	"The Wolves (Act I and II)"	Bon Iver	5:21
10.	"All the Days I've Missed You (Ilaij I)"	Colin Stetson	1:16
11.	"De rouille et d'os"		2:11
12.	"Le lac"		1:52
13.	"Le train"		3:39
14.	"La plage"		2:18
15.	"Marineland"		2:00
16.	"1er combat"		2:12
17.	"L'hôpital"		3:42
18.	"Stéphanie"		4:48
19.	"Les Paris"		2:18
20.	"L'Orque"		2:02
21.	"2ème combat"		1:37
22.	"Sam"		2:01
23.	"La loi du supermarché"		2:34
24.	"Le combattant"		2:25
25.	"Stéphanie et Sam"		1:50
26.	"Naissance de l'amour"		1:42
27.	"Ali"		2:03
28.	"Undercurrent"		1:46
Total length:			89:22

== Accolades ==
Accolades for Rust and Bone (Original Motion Picture Soundtrack)
Award / Film festival	Category	Recipient(s)	Result
César Awards	Best Original Score	Alexandre Desplat	Won
London Film Critics' Circle	Technical Achievement Award	Alexandre Desplat (music)	Nominated
World Soundtrack Awards	Soundtrack Composer of the Year	Alexandre Desplat	Nominated
