= Argo (soundtrack) =

Argo (Original Motion Picture Soundtrack)

Film score by Alexandre Desplat
- Released: October 9, 2012
- Recorded: 2012
- Studios: Sony Pictures Studios, Streisand Scoring Stage
- Genres: Film score; classical
- Length: 58:37
- Label: WaterTower Music
- Producer: Alexandre Desplat

Alexandre Desplat chronology
| Moonrise Kingdom (2012) | Argo (2012) | Rise of the Guardians (2012) |

Argo (Original Motion Picture Soundtrack) is a score album composed by Alexandre Desplat to the Academy Award-winning historical drama thriller film Argo. The film was directed by Ben Affleck, from a screenplay written by Chris Terrio, which was adapted from U.S. Central Intelligence Agency operative Antonio J. Mendez's eponymous novel released in 1999, his memoir The Master of Disguise, and the Wired article by Joshuah Bearman, "The Great Escape: How the CIA Used a Fake Sci-Fi Flick to Rescue Americans from Tehran" (2007); Affleck also starred in the lead role as Mendez. The score album was released on October 9, 2012, by WaterTower Music, three days ahead of the film's release.

Desplat's score received critical acclaim and was nominated at several ceremonies, including Academy Awards, Golden Globe Awards, Grammy Awards, BAFTA Awards and Satellite Awards under the "Original Score" category, winning the latter.

== Background ==
"It's a movie which has two cycles, you know, there's the Hollywood cycle where we have to be a bit lighter, and there are all the spy Iranian settings. And I guess the challenge was to be able to keep the tension until the very end of the film and release when at last the hostages are released and on the plane. I have to navigate all that, you know, and find the tone, but Ben [Affleck] was really a great driver there."

— Alexandre Desplat, on the score for Argo.

Alexandre Desplat considered the film as three films bound into one: an Iranian story, a Hollywood story and an airport escape, as three separate films. For the first story, he used an otherworldly sound to "underscore people surrounded by danger who don't know how to cope with it", and for the Hollywood story, he used a combination of period rock music, with more humorous cues, as Mendez (Affleck) executes a fake movie cover for an "escape plan". For the airport escape sequence, he used a more symphonic sound. The first half of the film consisted of occidental music. Desplat used minimal underscore in the first 30-minutes of the film, as "There's a sense of danger that never stops, propelling both the characters and the story, which is what I tried to convey in the score". He composed the minimalist score with the use of ney, oud, kemenche, and Persian percussions.

Desplat's likeness for Middle Eastern and Egyptian Music, led him to blend indigenous instruments into the orchestral score. He also roped various musicians from Turkey and France to work on the score, as well as Persian pop singer, Sussan Deyhim, whom Desplat had admired. Deyhim provided backing vocals to the instrumental track "Scent of Death" when Mendez arrives in Iran. Desplat wrote a rhythmic motif for her, which consists of jazz scatting, but in a Persian way, and a lamenting melody. He blended her voice with the Middle Eastern and symphonic orchestras, but created a distinctive sound with Deyhim's voice being combined the sounds of oud and kemenche. Desplat provided melancholic cues for the album, which were The main theme, "The Mission" and "Missing Home", while for "Cleared Iranian Airspace", he used traditional and classical sound.

Desplat mentioned of a strange and "otherwordly sound" created during the brief moments, with the use of melodies are played by the instruments and the singers at the same time, which gives an "alien texture" as the singers play the sound in unison. He recalled "I remember in the 70s, especially, people were not listening to this kind of music, from Pakistan or India, especially in America. That was the idea—Ben has tried to immerse us with all of the visuals of the 1970s. In the same way, the music is also trying to capture this gap between the American ear and the Middle Eastern ear."

In an interview for Vanity Fair, he explained about the need for a gentle score, rather than relying heavily on suspenseful music, saying "There are plateaus and then you go up another notch and another notch and another notch until the finale. That was the main structural issue we had to discuss with Ben. When that was done, I suggested that when we hit the Iranian territory, we change the color of the music. It was a bit suspenseful but gently suspenseful, then light and gentle in the comedic moments because there is no way to be comedic with music." He felt that the film would be very "chessy and unreal" if he opted to use a melody throughout the film, like The Bridge on the River Kwai (1957), and the "beginning of the film was almost like cinema verité".

== Critical reception ==
The soundtrack was critically acclaimed. Nathan Cone of Texas Public Radio had stated the score "would be especially appealing to fans of world music, and once again illustrates the musical and dramatic range of Desplat" after the score for Zero Dark Thirty and Rise of the Guardians.

James Southall of Movie Wave wrote, "Desplat – renowned as a precise, sometimes even clinical, composer – has so successfully written music which conveys a genuine sense of chaos. You never know quite what's round the corner and are constantly compelled to find out. The dramatic drive that runs through it all is very powerful, as carefully-crafted as music by this composer always is, but with an unusual edge to it." Jonathan Broxton wrote, "no amount of beautiful patriotic orchestral music or intelligent application of electronic and vocal effects will counterbalance the wailing women and traditional instrumentation that pervades almost the entire score".

Filmtracks.com wrote, "Argo is far from revolutionary, but it intelligently tackles tired stereotypes with fresh new ideas, translating into a surprisingly smooth listening experience on album. This is the type of work that could easily garner awards consideration given its strengths and the nature of the film, and the score would deserve such recognition."

== Awards and nominations ==
Argo's score was shortlisted along with 104 other film scores for Best Original Score category at the 85th Academy Awards. These included Desplat's other musical works such as Moonrise Kingdom, Rise of the Guardians and Zero Dark Thirty, which was surpassed by Argo, to receive final nomination but lost to Mychael Danna's score for Life of Pi.

| Award | Date of ceremony | Category | Recipient(s) | Result | Ref(s) |
|---|---|---|---|---|---|
| Academy Awards | February 24, 2013 | Best Original Score | Alexandre Desplat | Nominated | |
| Alliance of Women Film Journalists | January 8, 2013 | Best Film Score | Alexandre Desplat | Nominated | |
| British Academy Film Awards | February 10, 2013 | Best Original Music | Alexandre Desplat | Nominated | |
| Chicago Film Critics Association | December 17, 2012 | Best Original Score | Alexandre Desplat | Nominated | |
| Critics' Choice Movie Awards | January 10, 2013 | Best Score | Alexandre Desplat | Nominated | |
| Golden Globe Awards | January 13, 2013 | Best Original Score – Motion Picture | Alexandre Desplat | Nominated | |
| Grammy Awards | January 26, 2014 | Best Score Soundtrack for Visual Media | Alexandre Desplat | Nominated | |
| International Film Music Critics Association | February 21, 2013 | Film Composer of the Year | Alexandre Desplat | Nominated | |
| San Diego Film Critics Society | December 11, 2012 | Best Score | Alexandre Desplat | Nominated | |
| Satellite Awards | December 16, 2012 | Best Original Score | Alexandre Desplat | Won | |
| World Soundtrack Academy | October 19, 2013 | Film Composer of the Year | Alexandre Desplat (Argo, Reality, Renoir, Rise of the Guardians, and Zero Dark Thirty) | Nominated | |

== Track listing ==
All tracks are written by Alexandre Desplat, except where noted.

| No. | Title | Length |
|---|---|---|
| 1. | "Argo" | 3:38 |
| 2. | "A Spy in Tehran" | 4:18 |
| 3. | "Scent of Death" | 3:25 |
| 4. | "The Mission" | 2:07 |
| 5. | "Hotel Messages" | 2:03 |
| 6. | "Held Up By Guards" | 5:31 |
| 7. | "The Business Card" | 2:55 |
| 8. | "Breaking Through the Gates" | 3:50 |
| 9. | "Tony Grills the Six" | 3:30 |
| 10. | "The Six Are Missing" | 3:21 |
| 11. | "Sweatshop" | 1:31 |
| 12. | "Drive to the Airport" | 3:45 |
| 13. | "Missing Home" | 3:00 |
| 14. | "Istanbul and the Blue Mosque" | 2:18 |
| 15. | "Bazaar" | 3:45 |
| 16. | "Cleared Iranian Airspace" | 6:01 |
| 17. | "Hace Tuto Guagua" (Traditional & Familion) | 3:39 |
| Total length: | | 58:37 |

For Your Consideration track list
| No. | Title | Length |
|---|---|---|
| 1. | "Argo" | 3:38 |
| 2. | "A Spy in Tehran" | 4:18 |
| 3. | "Scent of Death" | 3:25 |
| 4. | "The Mission" | 2:07 |
| 5. | "Hotel Messages" | 2:03 |
| 6. | "Held Up By Guards" | 5:31 |
| 7. | "The Business Card" | 2:55 |
| 8. | "Breaking Through the Gates" | 3:50 |
| 9. | "Tony Grills the Six" | 3:30 |
| 10. | "The Six Are Missing" | 3:21 |
| 11. | "Sweatshop" | 1:31 |
| 12. | "Drive to the Airport" | 3:45 |
| 13. | "Missing Home" | 3:00 |
| 14. | "Istanbul and the Blue Mosque" | 2:18 |
| 15. | "Bazaar" | 3:45 |
| 16. | "Cleared Iranian Airspace" | 6:01 |
| Total length: | | 54:58 |

== Tribute ==
Through one of the final scenes, an excerpt is played from the tracks My name is Tom and Parting Company, from Harry Gregson-Williams' soundtrack for the 2001 movie Spy Game (uncredited elsewhere).
