= Zero Dark Thirty (soundtrack) =

Zero Dark Thirty (Original Motion Picture Soundtrack)

Film score by Alexandre Desplat
- Released: December 25, 2012
- Recorded: 2012
- Genre: Film score
- Length: 52:40
- Label: Madison Gate
- Producer: Alexandre Desplat

Alexandre Desplat chronology
Rise of the Guardians (2012)	Zero Dark Thirty (2012)	Zulu (2013)

Zero Dark Thirty (Original Motion Picture Soundtrack) is the soundtrack to the 2012 film Zero Dark Thirty. Featuring an original score composed by Alexandre Desplat, the soundtrack was released through Madison Gate Records on December 25, 2012.

== Development ==
French composer Alexandre Desplat scored music for Zero Dark Thirty, who compared the film's music to that of Akira Kurosawa-directed Japanese action film Ran (1985) where music served as a storytelling device in the film. Likewise, the film's director Kathryn Bigelow instructed him that the music should be not felt like a contemporary score but as a storytelling device that follows the action. Following an archaic and organic structure of the film's score, he opined that the film takes him back to Middle Ages. Desplat refrained from writing music in the higher range and employed musicians from the London Symphony Orchestra—12 horns, 12 trombones, 3 tubas, 12 violas, 12 celli and 12 basses. (Note: However, Desplat in an IndieWire interview stated that he had employed 9 bassists and 16–20 horn players.) Few soloists would play electric cello, violin and duduk. Their contributions provide a "very deep and dark type of sound without being in-your-face", according to Desplat.

== Critical response ==
Tim Grierson of Screen International described it as "one of his [Desplat's] sparest and most effective recent scores, underlying the tension in key moments without overpowering the visuals". David Edelstein of Vulture wrote "Alexandre Desplat’s chord progressions are mysterious, suffused with awe." Christy Lemire of The Florida Times-Union wrote "Alexandre Desplat's score is suitably understated". Don Groves of SBS wrote "the Middle East-influenced score by Alexandre Desplat is a subtle enhancement of the visceral imagery on screen." Peter Debruge of Variety wrote that Desplat's "Middle East-inflected score" sets the mood bare minimum. Stephanie Zacharek of MTV indicated that Desplat's score is a nod to John Barry's theme "Capsule In Space" from You Only Live Twice (1967), further describing it as "it's music that attaches a cost to experience.

== Track listing ==
Zero Dark Thirty (Original Motion Picture Soundtrack) track listing
No.	Title	Length
1.	"Flight to Compound"	5:07
2.	"Drive to Embassy"	1:44
3.	"Bombings"	3:46
4.	"Ammar"	4:06
5.	"Monkeys"	2:59
6.	"Northern Territories"	3:46
7.	"Seals Take Off"	2:34
8.	"21 Days"	2:04
9.	"Preparation for Attack"	1:45
10.	"Balawi"	3:15
11.	"Dead End"	3:26
12.	"Maya on Plane"	3:59
13.	"Area 51"	1:42
14.	"Tracking Calls"	3:46
15.	"Picket Lines"	3:03
16.	"Towers"	2:02
17.	"Chopper"	1:48
18.	"Back to Base"	2:41

== Awards and nominations ==
Awards and nominations for Zero Dark Thirty (Original Motion Picture Soundtrack)
Award	Date of ceremony	Category	Recipients and nominees	Result
Alliance of Women Film Journalists	January 7, 2013	Best Film Music or Score	Alexandre Desplat	Nominated
Chicago Film Critics Association	December 17, 2012	Best Original Score	Alexandre Desplat	Nominated
Grammy Awards	January 26, 2014	Best Score Soundtrack for Visual Media	Alexandre Desplat	Nominated
World Soundtrack Awards	October 19, 2013	Soundtrack Composer of the Year	Alexandre Desplat	Nominated (Note: Also for Argo (2012), Renoir (2012), and Zero Dark Thirty (2012))
