= Donald Spoto =

American biographer and theologian (1941–2023)

- Born: June 28, 1941; New Rochelle, New York, U.S.
- Died: February 11, 2023 (aged 81); Køge, Denmark
- Education: Iona College (BA, 1963); Fordham University (MA, 1966; PhD, 1970)
- Spouse: Ole Flemming Larsen

Donald Spoto (June 28, 1941 – February 11, 2023) was an American biographer, theologian, and former Catholic monk. He was known for his biographies of people in the worlds of film and theater, and for his books on theology and spirituality.

Spoto wrote 29 books, including biographies of Alfred Hitchcock, Laurence Olivier, Teresa Wright, Tennessee Williams, Ingrid Bergman, James Dean, Elizabeth Taylor, Grace Kelly, Marlene Dietrich, Marilyn Monroe, Audrey Hepburn, and Alan Bates. The BBC/HBO television film The Girl (2012), about Tippi Hedren's experience during the filming of The Birds (1963), was based in part on Spoto's work on Hitchcock.

Spoto wrote biographical accounts of the House of Windsor from the Victorian era to Diana, Princess of Wales, and of religious figures such as Jesus, Saint Joan of Arc, and Saint Francis of Assisi; the latter was made into a television program by Faith & Values Media.

== Early life and education ==
A native of New Rochelle, New York, Spoto graduated from Iona Preparatory School in 1959 and received his BA summa cum laude from Iona College in 1963 and his MA and PhD from Fordham University in 1966 and 1970, respectively. In 2013, the Academy of Art University (San Francisco) bestowed on him an honorary doctorate in recognition of his contributions to literature and education.

== Career ==
=== Teaching ===
Spoto taught theology, Christian mysticism, and Biblical literature at Fairfield University, at the College of New Rochelle, and later film studies at the New School for Social Research from 1966 until 1986. He taught intensive Latin at the CUNY Latin/Greek Institute in the summer of 1974. From 1987 he taught at the University of Southern California. In addition, he was a visiting lecturer at the British Film Institute and the National Film Theatre in London from 1980 until 1986. In 2003, he was named permanent Guest Lecturer at the Danish Film Institute, Copenhagen.

Spoto served on the boards of directors of Human Rights Watch, Death Penalty Focus, and the San Francisco-based Children's Legal Protection Center.

=== Writing ===
In the 1970s Spoto began writing biographies of film directors, actors and playwrights. He has also written accounts of such religious figures as Jesus, St. Joan of Arc, and St. Francis of Assisi. The latter was made into a television program of the same title, Reluctant Saint: Francis of Assisi, produced for Faith & Values Media.

Spoto's Jacqueline Bouvier Kennedy Onassis: A Life was adapted into a four-hour drama which aired in 2000 on CBS. He was an executive producer of the project, along with George Stelzner of West Egg Studios.

Spoto served as script consultant for The Girl (2012), an HBO/BBC TV movie based on Spoto's books about Alfred Hitchcock. Starring Toby Jones and Sienna Miller, the film offers an account of Hitchcock's treatment of Tippi Hedren during the filming of The Birds (1963).

== Reception ==
In 1992, Publishers Weekly called his life of Laurence Olivier "a magnificent, moving biography worthy of its protean subject". Michael Coveney, reviewing the Alan Bates biography in 2007 in The Guardian, described him as "an American quasi-academic gossipmonger who has produced zestful, authoritative books..." Barry Forshaw wrote in The Times that Spoto is "one of the most perspicacious biographers, a man whose insights into his subjects are always razor-sharp."

His biography of Teresa Wright, A Girl's Got to Breathe: The Life of Teresa Wright was published in February 2016. Spoto was a close friend to Wright for more than 30 years and was given exclusive access by her family to her papers and correspondence. Publishers Weekly called the biography "an engaging and intimate portrait". Library Journal praised the book as "an affectionate tribute to a shamefully neglected talent".

== Personal life and death ==
Spoto was openly gay and lived with his husband, Ole Flemming Larsen, near Copenhagen, Denmark.

Spoto died of a brain hemorrhage in Køge on February 11, 2023, at the age of 81.

== Selected works ==
- (1976; rev. ed. 1999). The Art of Alfred Hitchcock. Doubleday Anchor.
- (1978). Stanley Kramer, Film Maker. Putnam.
- (1978). Camerado: Hollywood and the American Man. Plume.
- (1983). The Dark Side of Genius: The Life of Alfred Hitchcock. Little, Brown & Co.
- (1985). The Kindness of Strangers: The Life of Tennessee Williams. Little, Brown & Co.
- (1985). Falling in Love Again: Marlene Dietrich. Little, Brown & Co.
- (1989). Lenya: A Life. Little, Brown & Co.
- (1990). Madcap: The Life of Preston Sturges. Little, Brown & Co.
- (1992). Laurence Olivier: A Biography. HarperCollins.
- (1992). Blue Angel: The Life of Marlene Dietrich. Doubleday.
- (1993). Marilyn Monroe: The Biography. Harper Collins.
- (1995). A Passion for Life: The Biography of Elizabeth Taylor. HarperCollins.
- (1995). The Decline and Fall of the House of Windsor. Simon & Schuster.
  - Also published as Dynasty: The Turbulent Saga of the Royal Family from Victoria to Diana.
- (1996). Rebel: The Life and Legend of James Dean. HarperCollins.
- (1997). Diana: The Last Year. Random House.
- (1997). Notorious: The Life of Ingrid Bergman. HarperCollins.
- (1998). The Hidden Jesus: A New Life. St. Martin's Press.
- (2000). Jacqueline Bouvier Kennedy Onassis: A Life. St. Martin's Press.
- (2002). Reluctant Saint: The Life of Francis of Assisi. Viking Press.
- (2002). In Silence: Why We Pray. Viking Press.
- (2006). Enchantment: The Life of Audrey Hepburn. Random House/Harmony.
- (2007). Joan: The Mysterious Life of the Heretic Who Became a Saint. HarperSanFrancisco.
- (2007). Otherwise Engaged: The Life of Alan Bates. Hutchinson
- (2008). Spellbound by Beauty: Alfred Hitchcock and His Leading Ladies. Random House/Harmony and Hutchinson.
- (2009). High Society: The Life of Grace Kelly. Random House/Harmony.
- (2010). Possessed: The Life of Joan Crawford. Morrow.
- (2012). The Redgraves: A Family Epic. Crown.
- (2016). A Girl's Got To Breathe: The Life of Teresa Wright. University Press of Mississippi.
