= Marnie (opera) =

Opera by Nico Muhly

- Opera by Nico Muhly
- Librettist: Nicholas Wright
- Language: English
- Based on: Marnie by Winston Graham
- Premiere: November 18, 2017; English National Opera

Marnie is an opera by Nico Muhly to a libretto by Nicholas Wright based on the 1961 novel by Winston Graham.

== Performance history ==
The opera was commissioned by the Metropolitan Opera of New York and was first performed in a co-production of the Met and the English National Opera. The production design, which employed video projections, was by Julian Crouch and 59 Productions, the costumes, by Arianne Phillips, and the stage lighting, by Kevin Adams. The opera premiered at the English National Opera in London on November 18, 2017, and at the Met in New York on October 19, 2018, both directed by Michael Mayer. The New York performances, conducted by Robert Spano (in his Met debut), featured Isabel Leonard (Marnie), Christopher Maltman (Mark Rutland), Iestyn Davies (Terry Rutland), Anthony Dean Griffey (Mr Strutt), Denyce Graves (Marnie's Mother), Ashley Emerson (Laura Fleet), Stacey Tappan (Dawn), Marie Te Hapuku (Miss Fedder), and Ian Koziara (Derek). The seventh and last performance of Marnie in the New York season was transmitted in high-definition video as part of the Metropolitan Opera Live in HD series. It is now available for streaming at Met Opera on Demand with a subscription or rental fee, but was provided free of charge on April 30 and November 24, 2020, and on June 28, 2021.

== Roles ==
Roles, voice types, and premiere cast
Role	Voice type	Premiere cast, 18 November 2017 Conductor: Martyn Brabbins
Marnie	mezzo-soprano	Sasha Cooke
Mark Rutland	baritone	Daniel Okulitch
Terry Rutland	countertenor	James Laing
Mrs Rutland	soprano	Lesley Garrett
Lucy	soprano	Diana Montague
Mr Strutt	tenor	Alasdair Elliott
Marnie's Mother	contralto	Kathleen Wilkinson
Laura Fleet	soprano	Eleanor Dennis
Malcolm Fleet	tenor	Matthew Durkan
Dr Roman	bass	Darren Jeffery
Dawn	soprano	Alexa Mason
Miss Fedder	soprano	Susanna Tudor-Thomas
Marnie's Mother in 1940	soprano	Ella Kirkpatick
Little Boy	boy soprano	Leo Sellis / William Brady
Derek	tenor	David Newman
Shadow Marnie 1	soprano	Charlotte Beamont
Shadow Marnie 2	soprano	Katie Coventry
Shadow Marnie 3	mezzo-soprano	Emma Kerr
Shadow Marnie 4	mezzo-soprano	Katie Stevenson
Chorus (office workers, anxiety chorus, hunt riders, country club guests, funeral attendees)
