= The Girl (2012 TV film) =

2012 British television film by Julian Jarrold

- Quad poster
- Genre: Biopic drama
- Based on: Spellbound by Beauty by Donald Spoto
- Written by: Gwyneth Hughes
- Directed by: Julian Jarrold
- Starring: Toby Jones; Sienna Miller
- Theme music composer: Philip Miller
- Country of origin: United Kingdom
- Original language: English

Production
- Producer: Amanda Jenks
- Cinematography: John Pardue
- Editor: Andrew Hulme
- Running time: 91 minutes
- Production company: BBC/HBO

Original release
- Network: HBO
- Release: 20 October 2012
- Network: BBC Two
- Release: 26 December 2012

The Girl is a 2012 British television film directed by Julian Jarrold, written by Gwyneth Hughes and produced by the BBC and HBO Films. The film stars Sienna Miller as Tippi Hedren and Toby Jones as Alfred Hitchcock. It is based on Donald Spoto's 2009 book Spellbound by Beauty: Alfred Hitchcock and His Leading Ladies, which discusses the English film director Hitchcock and the women who played leading roles in his films. The Girl's title was inspired by Hitchcock's alleged nickname for Hedren.

The film depicts Hitchcock's alleged obsession with Hedren, the American model and actress he brought from relative obscurity to star in his 1963 film The Birds. Hitchcock becomes infatuated with his leading lady; when she rebuffs his advances, he subjects her to a series of traumatic experiences during the filming of The Birds. Hitchcock's obsession with Hedren continues when she stars in his next production, Marnie. Hedren grows increasingly uncomfortable with his attentions, and decides that she needs to escape the situation. However, she cannot work elsewhere because of her exclusive contract with Hitchcock; this effectively ends her Hollywood career.

The Girl made its television debut in the United States on 20 October 2012 on HBO and aired in the United Kingdom on BBC Two on 26 December. Jones and Miller were nominated for awards at the 2013 Golden Globe Awards and the British Academy Television Awards for their roles in the film, which received mixed reviews from critics.

== Plot ==
The film is a partially fictionalised account of the relationship between Alfred Hitchcock and Tippi Hedren. In 1961, Hitchcock notices Hedren in a television commercial for a diet drink. He wants to turn her into the next Grace Kelly, with whom he had worked extensively during the 1950s. Hedren passes her screen test and is groomed for the starring role in Hitchcock's latest film, The Birds; the director instructs her about her dress and appearance.

Captivated by Hedren's Nordic looks, Hitchcock becomes infatuated with her. While filming The Birds, he makes physical advances to her in the back of a limousine but she rebuffs him and escapes through the back door. In retaliation for her rejection, Hitchcock exposes Hedren to terrifying encounters with birds. A mechanical bird breaks the supposedly shatterproof glass of a telephone booth during filming, scratching Hedren's face with splintering glass. After arriving on set to shoot a scene where Hedren's character (Melanie Daniels) is trapped in an attic with aggressive birds, she discovers that Hitchcock has ordered the mechanical birds to be replaced with live ones. He demands the scene be repeated until he is satisfied that Hedren's reaction looks authentic. This takes a protracted several days of filming, leaving Hedren traumatised.

With The Birds a box-office success, Hitchcock and Hedren begin work on Marnie. However, Hedren finds the film's content (including a marital rape scene) and Hitchcock's obsession with her mentally and emotionally exhausting. The director is frustrated by what he sees as Hedren's coldness towards him. During a conversation with writer Evan Hunter, Hitchcock admits that he has erectile dysfunction and his only sexual partner is his wife (screenwriter Alma Reville). He later declares his love for Hedren; she walks away, leaving him frustrated and further rejected.

Hitchcock refuses Hedren's request for time off to attend the Photoplay Awards in New York City (where she is nominated for the Most Promising Actress award), and tells her he will require her to make herself sexually available to him on demand if her career is to continue. Hedren quits working for Hitchcock after completing Marnie, but he refuses to release her from her contract; this prevents her from working for another production company, effectively ending her Hollywood career. Two notes before the titles inform the viewer that Hitchcock and Hedren never worked together again, and The Birds and Marnie are considered his last classic films.

== Cast ==
- Toby Jones as Alfred Hitchcock
- Sienna Miller as Tippi Hedren
- Penelope Wilton as Peggy Robertson
- Imelda Staunton as Alma Reville
- Candice D'Arcy as Josephine Milton
- Carl Beukes as Jim Brown
- Conrad Kemp as Evan Hunter

== Production ==
=== Background and development ===
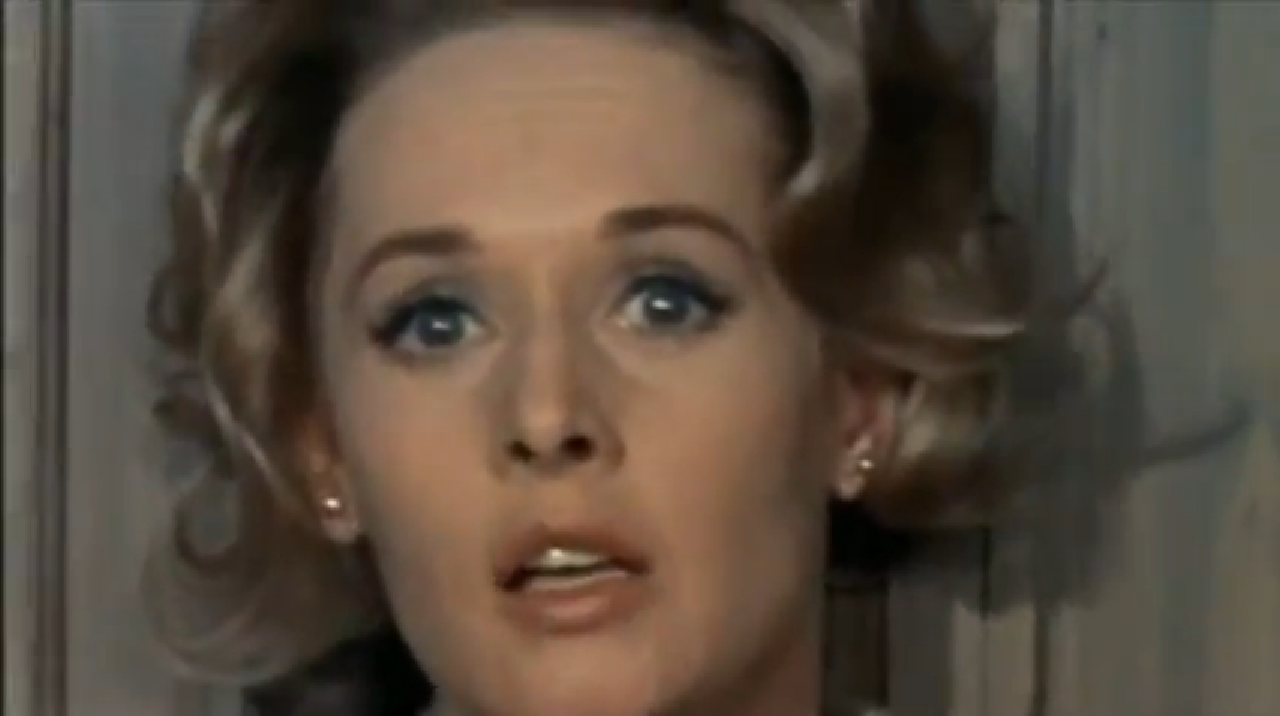
Tippi Hedren, seen here in a trailer for The Birds, was described as "absolutely thrilled" that Sienna Miller had been cast to play her.

The Girl is based on Donald Spoto's 2009 book, Spellbound by Beauty: Alfred Hitchcock and His Leading Ladies, which examines the relationships between Alfred Hitchcock and the female stars of his films. Spoto wrote that Hitchcock attempted to turn Tippi Hedren (star of The Birds and Marnie) into his perfect woman, choosing the clothes and lipstick he thought she should wear. Hedren told Spoto that Hitchcock fantasised about running off with her.

Details of a film examining Hitchcock's obsession with Hedren were reported in December 2011. The Girl, written by Gwyneth Hughes, would star Toby Jones as Hitchcock and Sienna Miller as Hedren. In a post-production BBC press release about the film in November 2012, Hughes described her enthusiasm when she was approached about the project while on holiday: "[I] got a phone call from producer Amanda Jenks. She only managed to get out the words 'Alfred Hitchcock and Tippi Hedren' before I was already shouting 'yes yes yes!' to this seductive, sinister, deeply touching story of love and obsession among Hollywood royalty". Hughes interviewed Hedren and members of Hitchcock's crew before preparing a script. She described her discussions with Hedren: "Her wisdom and insights have helped me to put her real life ordeal on to the screen. I know Tippi is absolutely thrilled, as I am, with the casting of Sienna Miller to play her". The film's title was inspired by the name Hitchcock used for Hedren after she stopped working for him.

Diana Cilliers designed the costumes, recreating what Hedren wore (including Melanie Daniels' green suit) in Hitchcock's films: "[T]here were certain items that we just copied – such as the Birds suit and the yellow Marnie bag, but otherwise we looked at clean lines, colours. Nothing too fussy".

=== Filming ===
As part of her research Miller (who was in the early stages of pregnancy) spoke to Hedren several times during filming, and the two became friends. Live birds were used to recreate the filming of the attic scene in The Birds. Miller told the Radio Times: "I did go through a bird attack for two hours. It pales in comparison to what [Hedren] was subjected to, but it was pretty horrible. There were men off-camera with boxes of birds, throwing seagulls and pigeons in my face".

Jones's role as Hitchcock required him to spend four hours each day being made up with prosthetic makeup and a fatsuit, and he did daily twenty-minute vocal exercises to imitate Hitchcock's distinctive speech. In interview with The Scotsman, Jones said that "[Hitchcock's] voice was so beautiful. There's something in the rhythm and roll of it that is connected to the way Hitchcock thinks and moves. Then there is everything he ingested – the cigar smoking and drinking that's imprinted on his voice. And everywhere he lived; you can hear cockney London, California, and a plummy received pronunciation in that voice".

=== Release ===
As part of its marketing campaign for The Girl, HBO released a 30-second trailer in August 2012. During a Television Critics Association press tour promoting the film, Hedren said: "I have to say that when I first heard Toby's [Jones] voice as Alfred Hitchcock, my body just froze". Hedren's daughter, Melanie Griffith, attended a screening; when the film ended, the audience was silent until Griffith said: "Well, now I have to go back into therapy again!" Hedren attended a London screening in October. The Girl made its US television debut on HBO and HBO Canada on 20 October. It had its UK premiere on 26 December, as part of BBC Two's Christmas programming. The film was released on DVD in the UK on 7 January 2013.

== Historical accuracy ==
Hedren gave Spoto an account of the director as a sexual predator for his 1983 book, The Dark Side of a Genius (1983). Spoto wrote that Hitchcock made "an overt sexual proposition that she could neither ignore nor answer casually". Hedren alleged in Spoto's 2009 book, Spellbound by Beauty: Alfred Hitchcock and His Leading Ladies, that Hitchcock actually asked her to "make myself sexually available and accessible to him – however and whenever and wherever he wanted". Spoto was the first person Hedren told her story to. She said that "it was embarrassing and insulting - there were a lot of reasons why I didn't want to tell the story. I didn't want it to be taken advantage of, twisted, turned and made into an even uglier situation than it was. It wasn't until years later that I told Donald the story. (...) He is absolutely true and honest in this book". She previously said, in 1973, while Hitchcock was still alive, that a major life-style difference caused a split in their relationship: "He was too possessive and too demanding. I cannot be possessed by anyone. But, then, that's my own hangup".

Hedren's account contrasted with the many interviews she gave about her time with Hitchcock, her presence at the AFI Life Achievement Award ceremony honoring him in 1979, and her presence at his funeral. When asked about it, Hedren answered: "He ruined my career, but he didn't ruin my life. That time of my life was over. I still admire the man for who he was".

Other actresses have spoken about the close attention Hitchcock paid to details of the leading ladies' characters and appearances in his films, but they said that no harassment was involved. Eva Marie Saint, who starred in 1959's North by Northwest, told The Daily Telegraph that "Hitchcock was a gentleman, he was funny, he was so attentive to me, with the character, and he cared about everything my character Eve Kendall wore. He had an eye for the specifics of the character".

Kim Novak, who worked on Hitchcock's 1958 Vertigo, disputed the film's view of the director, but also stated: "I won't dispute Tippi if that's what she saw". Novak told The Daily Telegraph: "I feel bad about all the stuff people are saying about him now, that he was a weird character. I did not find him to be weird at all. I never saw him make a pass at anybody or act strange to anybody". Louise Latham, who played Hedren's mother in Marnie, dismissed claims of Hitchcock's predatory nature in Broadcast magazine: "I find some of the allegations hard to believe ... I wasn't aware of her being hassled on the set".

Nora Brown (widow of James H. Brown, first assistant director on The Birds and Marnie, who knew Hitchcock for several years) said that her husband would not have endorsed The Girl's interpretation of events and the film's portrayal of Hitchcock would have saddened him. Gwyneth Hughes interviewed James Brown as part of her background research for the film, but he died before the film was completed. In October, Nora Brown told The Daily Telegraph that she had written to Hughes expressing her anger. Hughes has said that James H. Brown backed up Hedren's claims of sexual harassment. Tony Lee Moral, author of two books about the making of the Hitchcock films in which Hedren starred, echoed Brown's comments. Writing for Broadcast in December, Moral (who interviewed Jim Brown at length for his 2013 book, The Making of Hitchcock's The Birds) recalled a remark Brown made about Hitchcock: "Some of the things that are expressed about [Hitchcock] are highly over exaggerated. I think Hitch became upset because he thought Tippi wasn't fulfilling the star quality that he thought she had or was looking for".

In a 2016 interview with Larry King, Hedren claimed that "[the sexual advances] didn't happen until we were almost finished with Marnie", and when asked if any of such sexual advances happened during the filming of The Birds, she replied, "Never". Further on, she was asked if Hitchcock was "OK up until then" and "easy to work with", to which Hedren replied, "Yes, yes [...] It was a perfect situation".

In an interview with FT Magazine's Rosie Millard, Hedren discussed Hitchcock's attitude towards her after she decided not to work for him again: "He did ruin my career. He kept me under contract, paid me to do nothing for close on two years". Hitchcock sold her contract to Universal Studios, which dismissed her when she refused to work on one of its television shows. However, her acting career continued and she appeared in a number of film and television productions. Hedren said that while she was still under contract to Hitchcock, he turned down several film roles on her behalf, and was particularly disappointed when she heard from French director François Truffaut that he had wanted her for his film Fahrenheit 451. Truffaut's daughter Laura disputed this, telling Tony Lee Moral her mother had expressed surprise at the mention of Hedren's possible involvement in the project. Laura Truffaut was also sceptical of the story: "It is extremely unlikely in my view that my father seriously entertained this project without sharing it with my mother as he was not secretive about the other actors who were considered for casting".

== Reception ==
=== Criticism and reaction ===
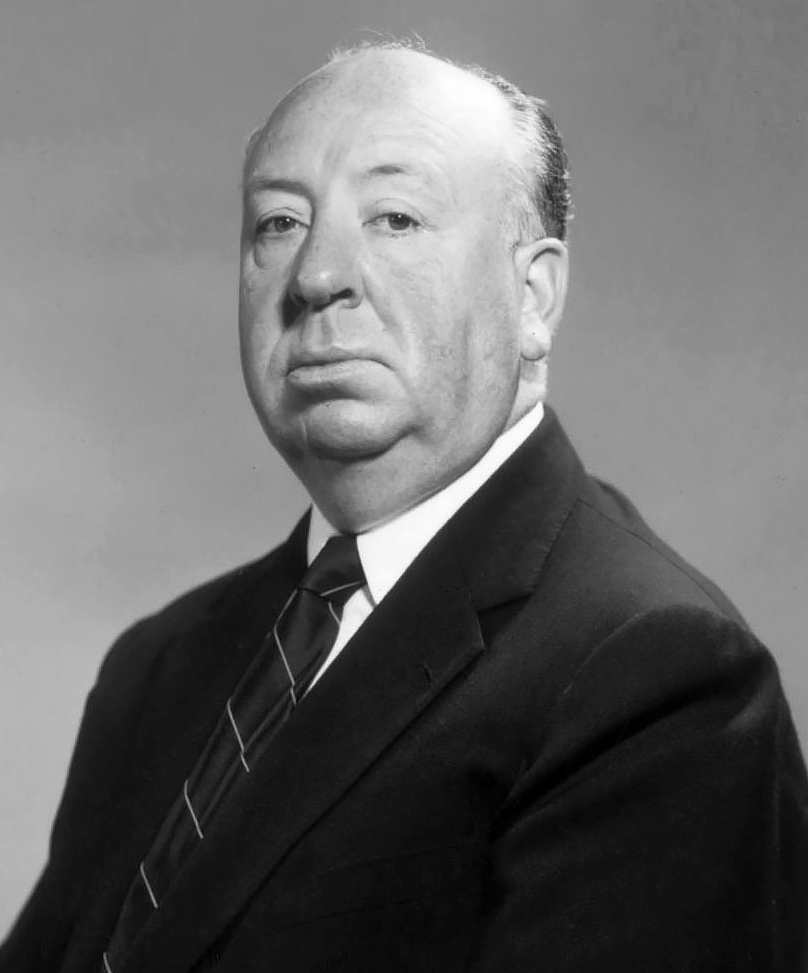
Studio publicity shot of Alfred Hitchcock, who some felt was unfairly represented in The Girl.

The film's portrayal of Hitchcock as a sexual predator was criticised. On the day of its UK television premiere, David Millward of The Daily Telegraph quoted Eva Marie Saint, Doris Day and Kim Novak, who described their work relationship with Hitchcock as a more positive one than Hedren suggested of hers. Writing for savehitchcock.com (a website established in response to the media's portrayal of Hitchcock), John Russell Taylor – author of the 1978 biography Hitch – said the film is "totally absurd".

In an interview with London's Evening Standard in January 2013, Anthony Hopkins (who played the eponymous role in the 2012 Alfred Hitchcock biopic Hitchcock) questioned The Girl's portrayal of the director and the need for a film about that period of Hitchcock's career: "I talked to Tippi Hedren one day ... and she never mentioned that ... Whatever his obsession was, she didn't want to dwell on it ... I don't think it's necessary to put all that into a movie". Speaking to The Independent later that month, Hitchcock director Sacha Gervasi said, "[The Girl] seems a rare one-note portrayal of a man who was a little more complex than that. A lot of people, who were there, do not recognise this portrayal of him as this monster". Danny Huston, who played screenwriter Whitfield Cook in Hitchcock, told WENN.com that he believed Hitchcock would not have contested Hedren's account of him: "Hitchcock was such a deliciously dark character that I don't think he would dismiss what Tippi was saying as not true".

Prior to the film's release, Hedren said in October that although she believed the film accurately portrays Hitchcock's negative behaviour towards her, the time constraints of a 90-minute film prevented telling the entire story of her career with him. She told television critic Rob Salem: "It wasn't a constant barrage of harassment. If it had been constantly the way we have had to do it in this film, I would have been long gone".

=== Reviews ===
Before the film's US television debut, Alessandra Stanley of The New York Times was critical of the film's objectives: "[T]he trouble with The Girl is that it tries to psychoanalyze Hitchcock but fails by trying to know the man too much. It's a movie about Hitchcock that ignores his best advice: 'Suspense is like a woman. The more left to the imagination, the more the excitement'". Richard Brody of The New Yorker also gave the film a negative review, writing that, instead of being a drama, the film is an unoriginal work of criticism which "points to what everyone ought already to have been talking about in the first place: not least, that it's no surprise to learn that a filmmaker whose art is devoted to pain, fear, control, and sexual obsession also experienced and inflicted them in life". On the day of its UK premiere, James Rampton of The Independent wrote that The Girl was "no mere black-and-white hatchet job on Hitch. It does not seek to portray him as an unambiguous monster; rather, it highlights the profound psychological damage that plagued the director throughout his life". The Guardian's Deborah Orr was generally positive about the film: "[T]here was only one thing wrong with The Girl. There was no Hitchcock in the director's chair to make it the utterly compelling psychological drama that it could have been".

The Telegraph's Nigel Farndale praised the film's balanced view of the director: "[E]ven though he was portrayed in this exquisite drama as a manipulative, vindictive martinet, the portrait was not unsympathetic". The Daily Mirror's Jane Simon echoed this view, praising Jones's Hitchcock and writing that the actor "managed to give [Hitchcock] touches of humanity, too. There are moments when you feel a real pang of sympathy for Hitchcock, although admittedly they don't last long". She also added: "[G]liding gracefully through it all (and with an impeccable American accent) Sienna Miller brings untouchable beauty and icy glamour, but also captures the extraordinary resilience Hedren must have had to withstand everything Hitchcock threw at her". In The Telegraph, Clive James said "[a] better choice [to play Hedren] could not have been made than Sienna Miller, who is even lovelier than Hedren was ... Toby Jones, quite believably looked stunned". John Doyle of Canada's The Globe and Mail was less impressed with the actors' performances. Of Miller (whom he described as "good but not great") he wrote that "she doesn't have the iciness that Hedren had in her youth and she struggles to convey Hedren's enormous strength of character as a woman unwilling to let Hitchcock have his way". Doyle was equally critical of Jones, describing him as someone who "seems to be imitating Hitchcock rather than inhabiting the role".

Historian Alex von Tunzelmann gave the film a mixed review in The Guardian: "The Girl is perhaps a more effective piece of film-making than Hitchcock, though it is also more questionable in its portrayal of the director [...][t]he film depicts [the attic scene] accurately, though Jones's Hitchcock appears to be more gratified by the spectacle than the real Hitch was". Simon quotes Donald Spoto's book The Dark Side of Genius (1983), in which Hedren told Spoto that "[Hitchcock] was terribly upset by all this"; screenwriter Evan Hunter said that "[h]e wanted to shoot it, but something in him didn't want to shoot it, and everybody could hear how nervous he was". Nancy deWolf Smith of The Wall Street Journal wrote that the film should not be viewed in terms of truths or untruths, but instead as "an exquisitely lurid morality play in the Hitchcock style", calling The Girl "an original masterpiece that pays tribute to Hitchcock's talent and vision".

On the review aggregator website Rotten Tomatoes, 70% of 44 critics' reviews are positive. The website's consensus reads: "The Girl may be too prosaic to properly evoke its subject, but sterling performances by Toby Jones and Sienna Miller bring to life one of cinematic history's most horrific abuses of power." On Metacritic, the film has a weighted average score of 66 out of 100 based on 21 critics, which the site labels as "generally favorable" reviews.

=== Ratings ===
According to viewing figures collected by Nielsen Media Research, The Girl's US television premiere (at 9:00 pm on Saturday, 20 October 2012) was watched by an average audience of 722,000. The first UK screening (at the same time, on 26 December) attracted an audience of 1.8 million, according to The Guardian.

== Accolades ==
Year	Award	Category	Nominee(s)	Result	Ref.
2012	Satellite Awards	Best Actress in a Miniseries or a Motion Picture Made for Television	Sienna Miller	Nominated	
2012	Women's Image Network Awards	Actress Made for Television Movie	Sienna Miller	Nominated	
2013	British Academy Television Awards	Best Single Drama	Julian Jarrold, Gwyneth Hughes, Amanda Jenks, and Leanne Klein	Nominated	
2013	British Academy Television Awards	Best Actor	Toby Jones	Nominated	
2013	British Academy Television Awards	Best Actress	Sienna Miller	Nominated	
2013	British Academy Television Awards	Best Supporting Actress	Imelda Staunton	Nominated	
2013	British Academy Television Craft Awards	Best Director – Fiction	Julian Jarrold	Nominated	
2013	British Academy Television Craft Awards	Best Writer – Drama	Gwyneth Hughes	Nominated	
2013	British Academy Television Craft Awards	Best Make Up and Hair Design	Nadine Prigge, Neill Gorton, and Clinton Aiden Smith	Nominated	
2013	British Academy Television Craft Awards	Best Production Design	Darryl Hammer	Won	
2013	Broadcasting Press Guild Awards	Best Actress	Sienna Miller	Nominated	
2013	Critics' Choice Television Awards	Best Actor in a Movie/Miniseries	Toby Jones	Nominated	
2013	Critics' Choice Television Awards	Best Supporting Actress in a Movie/Miniseries	Sienna Miller	Nominated	
2013	Critics' Choice Television Awards	Best Supporting Actress in a Movie/Miniseries	Imelda Staunton	Nominated	
2013	Golden Globe Awards	Best Miniseries or Television Film		Nominated	
2013	Golden Globe Awards	Best Actor in a Miniseries or Television Film	Toby Jones	Nominated	
2013	Golden Globe Awards	Best Actress in a Miniseries or Television Film	Sienna Miller	Nominated	
2013	Online Film & Television Association Awards	Best Motion Picture or Miniseries		Nominated	
2013	Online Film & Television Association Awards	Best Actor in a Motion Picture or Miniseries	Toby Jones	Nominated	
2013	Online Film & Television Association Awards	Best Actress in a Motion Picture or Miniseries	Sienna Miller	Nominated	
2013	Online Film & Television Association Awards	Best Supporting Actress in a Motion Picture or Miniseries	Imelda Staunton	Nominated	
2013	Online Film & Television Association Awards	Best Direction of a Motion Picture or Miniseries	Julian Jarrold	Nominated	
2013	Online Film & Television Association Awards	Best Writing of a Motion Picture or Miniseries	Gwyneth Hughes	Nominated	
2013	Online Film & Television Association Awards	Best Cinematography in a Non-Series		Nominated	
2013	Online Film & Television Association Awards	Best Costume Design in a Non-Series		Nominated	
2013	Online Film & Television Association Awards	Best Editing in a Non-Series		Nominated	
2013	Online Film & Television Association Awards	Best Makeup/Hairstyling in a Non-Series		Nominated	
2013	Online Film & Television Association Awards	Best Music in a Non-Series		Nominated	
2013	Online Film & Television Association Awards	Best Production Design in a Non-Series		Nominated	
2013	Primetime Emmy Awards	Outstanding Lead Actor in a Miniseries or a Movie	Toby Jones	Nominated	
2013	Primetime Emmy Awards	Outstanding Supporting Actress in a Miniseries or a Movie	Imelda Staunton	Nominated	
2013	Primetime Emmy Awards	Outstanding Directing for a Miniseries, Movie or a Dramatic Special	Julian Jarrold	Nominated	
2013	Primetime Creative Arts Emmy Awards	Outstanding Cinematography for a Miniseries or Movie	John Pardue	Nominated	
2013	Primetime Creative Arts Emmy Awards	Outstanding Costumes for a Miniseries, Movie or a Special	Diana Cilliers and Melissa Moritz	Nominated	
2013	Primetime Creative Arts Emmy Awards	Outstanding Music Composition for a Miniseries, Movie or a Special (Original Dramatic Score)	Philip Miller	Nominated	
2013	Royal Television Society Craft & Design Awards	Best Effects – Digital	Simon Hansen	Won	
2013	Writers' Guild of Great Britain Awards	Best Short Form TV Drama	Gwyneth Hughes	Won	
