= Marnie (film) =

1964 film by Alfred Hitchcock

- Theatrical release poster
- Directed by: Alfred Hitchcock
- Screenplay by: Jay Presson Allen
- Based on: Marnie by Winston Graham
- Produced by: Alfred Hitchcock
- Starring: Tippi Hedren; Sean Connery; Diane Baker; Martin Gabel
- Cinematography: Robert Burks
- Edited by: George Tomasini
- Music by: Bernard Herrmann
- Production company: Geoffrey Stanley Productions
- Distributed by: Universal Pictures
- Release date: July 22, 1964 (New York City)
- Running time: 130 minutes
- Country: United States
- Language: English
- Budget: $3 million
- Box office: $7 million

Marnie is a 1964 American psychological thriller film directed by Alfred Hitchcock from a screenplay by Jay Presson Allen, based on the 1961 novel by Winston Graham. The film stars Tippi Hedren and Sean Connery.

Marnie became a milestone for several reasons. It was the last time a "Hitchcock blonde" would have a central role in one of his films. It also marked the end of Hitchcock's collaborations with cinematographer Robert Burks, who died in 1968; editor George Tomasini, who died soon after Marnie's release; and composer Bernard Herrmann, who was fired during Hitchcock's next film, Torn Curtain (1966), when Hitchcock and Universal studio executives wanted a pop-and-jazz-influenced score for the film.

The film received mixed reviews upon its release, but over the years it has been given a positive reevaluation among critics.

== Plot ==
Margaret "Marnie" Edgar, posing under the identity Marion Holland, flees with nearly $10,000 that she stole from the company safe of her employer, Sidney Strutt. Strutt is the head of a tax consulting company, where Marnie had worked after charming him into hiring her without references. Mark Rutland, a wealthy widower who owns a publishing company in Philadelphia, meets with Strutt on business; he learns about the theft and recalls Marnie from a previous visit.

Marnie travels to Virginia, where she stables a horse named Forio. She then visits her invalid mother, Bernice, whom she supports financially, in Baltimore. Marnie suffers from recurring nightmares and has an intense aversion to the color red, which triggers her hysteria.

Some months later, Marnie, posing as Mary Taylor, applies for a job at Mark's company. Although recognizing her, Mark hires her, cryptically telling his co-worker who questions hiring an applicant without references that he is an "interested spectator." While working weekend overtime with Mark, Marnie has a panic attack during a thunderstorm. Mark comforts, then kisses her. As they begin dating Mark discusses his background in zoology, particularly showing a fascination with predatory behavior. During a date at a racetrack, Mark fends off a persistent man who approaches Marnie, addressing her by another name, who Marnie insists she does not know.

Soon afterwards, Marnie steals money from Mark's company and flees again. Based on Marnie's comments on horses, Mark tracks her to the stable where she keeps Forio. Under threat of disclosure, Mark blackmails Marnie into marrying him, much to the chagrin of Lil, Mark's late wife's sister, who is in love with him.

On their honeymoon cruise, Marnie resists Mark's desire for physical intimacy, revealing that she finds sex repellent. Initially respecting her wishes, Mark tries to woo her, but after a few nights, they quarrel over Marnie's aloofness; Mark persists in physical advances while she freezes without consent. The next morning, Marnie attempts to drown herself in the ship's swimming pool, but Mark saves her.

After overhearing Marnie on a phone call, Lil tips off Mark that Marnie's mother is not dead, as Marnie claimed. Mark hires a private detective to investigate. Meanwhile, Lil overhears Mark telling Marnie he has "paid off Strutt" on her behalf. Lil mischievously invites Strutt and his wife to a party at the Rutland mansion. Strutt recognizes Marnie, but Mark pressures him into doing nothing. When Marnie later admits to additional robberies, Mark works to reimburse her victims to drop charges.

Mark brings Forio to their estate, pleasing Marnie. During a fox hunt, the red riding coat worn by one of the hunters triggers another of Marnie's fits and Forio bolts, misses a jump, injures its legs, and is left lying on the ground screaming in pain. Marnie frantically runs to a nearby house, obtains a gun, and euthanizes her horse. Overcome with grief, Marnie goes home, where she takes the key to Mark's office. She goes to the office and opens the safe, but finds herself unable to take the money. Mark arrives and "urges" her to take the money, testing her new reluctance to theft, but Marnie resists.

Mark takes Marnie to Baltimore to confront her mother and uncover the truth about Marnie's past. They arrive in a thunderstorm. As it is revealed that Bernice was a prostitute, Marnie's long-suppressed memories resurface. When Marnie was a small child, Bernice's sailor client tried to calm a frightened Marnie during a thunderstorm. Seeing him touch Marnie and believing he was trying to molest her, Bernice attacked him. As the sailor fended her off, Bernice fell and injured her leg, leaving her disabled. Frightened and attempting to protect her mother, Marnie fatally struck the man in the head with a fireplace poker. The sight of streaming blood caused her aversion to the color red, the thunderstorm that night caused her fear of them, and the connection of the deadly event to sex caused her revulsion at physical intimacy. To protect Marnie, Bernice told police that Bernice killed the man and prayed Marnie would forget the event. Understanding the reason behind her behavior, Marnie asks for Mark's help. They leave holding each other closely.

== Cast ==
Mark and Marnie on their honeymoon cruise

Theatrical trailer.

- Tippi Hedren as Margaret "Marnie" Edgar
- Sean Connery as Mark Rutland
- Diane Baker as Lil Mainwaring, Mark's former sister-in-law
- Martin Gabel as Sidney Strutt, Marnie's ex-boss
- Louise Latham as Bernice Edgar, Marnie's mother
- Bob Sweeney as Mark's Cousin Bob
- Milton Selzer as man at track
- Mariette Hartley as Susan Clabon, Marnie's co-worker
- Alan Napier as Mr. Rutland, Mark's father
- Bruce Dern as the sailor from Marnie's childhood
- Henry Beckman as the first detective
- S. John Launer as Sam Ward
- Edith Evanson as Rita
- Meg Wyllie as Mrs. Turpin
- Kimberly Beck as Jessica "Jessie" Cotton, whom Bernice babysits (uncredited)
- Melody Thomas Scott as young Marnie (uncredited)

In addition, Alfred Hitchcock's cameo can be seen five minutes into the film, entering from the left of a hotel corridor after Marnie passes by.

== Production ==
=== Development and writing ===
Alfred Hitchcock began developing the film adaptation of Winston Graham's novel Marnie in 1961. He commissioned Joseph Stefano, the screenwriter of Hitchcock's recently released Psycho, to work on the script. Stefano made extensive notes and wrote a 161-page treatment. The director's first choice to play the title role, Grace Kelly, by then Princess Grace of Monaco, withdrew from the project when the citizens of Monaco objected to her appearing in a film, especially as a sexually disturbed thief. Also, when Kelly married Prince Rainier in 1956, she had not fulfilled her contract with MGM, which could have prevented her from working for another studio. As a consequence of Kelly's departure from the film, Hitchcock put it aside to work on The Birds (1963).

After completing The Birds, Hitchcock returned to the Winston Graham adaptation. Stefano dropped out of the project due to his commitments to the ABC television series The Outer Limits. Evan Hunter, who had written the screenplay for The Birds, developed Marnie with Hitchcock, and wrote several drafts. Hunter was unhappy with the rape scene in the original novel, as he felt the audience would lose sympathy for the male lead. The director, however, was enthusiastic about the scene, describing to Hunter how he intended to film it:

Hitch held up his hands the way directors do when they're framing a shot. Palms out, fingers together, thumbs extended and touching to form a perfect square. Moving his hands toward my face, like a camera coming in for a close shot, he said, "Evan, when he sticks it in her, I want that camera right on her face".

Hunter wrote a draft containing the rape scene but also wrote an additional, substitute sequence, which he pleaded with Hitchcock to use instead. Hunter was dismissed from the project on 1 May 1963. His replacement, Jay Presson Allen, later told him that "you just got bothered by the scene that was his reason for making the movie. You just wrote your ticket back to New York". Just as Hunter had been unaware of Stefano's earlier work on Marnie, Presson Allen was not informed that she was the third writer to work on the adaptation.

=== Casting ===
According to royal biographer Craig Brown, Hitchcock offered Princess Grace the title role in March 1962, and she accepted; but in Monaco, the reaction to the announcement was categorically negative. As he wrote: "Monegasques did not like the idea of their princess being filmed kissing another man. Little did they know that Hitchcock also had plans for him to rape her". The film was also being developed during a tense period of France–Monaco relations in which France threatened to revoke Monaco's special status, leaving the ruling Grimaldi dynasty anxious to preserve the country's public image. Grace's announcement that she would donate her $800,000 fee to Monaco charities did nothing to appease the critics, and she dropped out of the project in June 1962.

Following the news of Kelly's unavailability, Marilyn Monroe sought the role of Marnie. Asked about this in an interview with Variety's Army Archerd, Hitchcock replied evasively that it was "an interesting idea". In his book Hitchcock and the Making of Marnie, Tony Lee Moral revealed that a studio executive at Paramount Pictures suggested actress Lee Remick to Hitchcock for the title role. Hitchcock also considered two other actresses who were, like Hedren, under his personal contract, Vera Miles and Claire Griswold, wife of director/actor Sydney Pollack. Eva Marie Saint, star of Hitchcock's North by Northwest (1959), and Susan Hampshire unsuccessfully pursued the role as well. In the end, Hitchcock opted to use Tippi Hedren, a one-time model he had seen in a commercial for a diet drink in 1961, then cast successfully in The Birds. According to Hedren, he offered her the role of Marnie during filming of The Birds. Hedren told writer Moral that she was "amazed" that Hitchcock would offer her this "incredible role", calling it a "once-in-a-lifetime opportunity". In 2005, more than 40 years after the film's release, Hedren declared in an interview that Marnie was her favorite of the two films that she made with Hitchcock, because of the intriguing, complex, challenging character that she played.

Male lead Sean Connery had been worried that being under contract to Eon Productions for both James Bond and non-Bond films would limit his career and turned down every non-Bond film that Eon offered him. When asked what he wanted to do, Connery replied that he wanted to work with Alfred Hitchcock, which Eon arranged through their contacts. Connery also shocked many people at the time by asking to see a script, something that Connery did because he was worried about being typecast as a spy and he did not want to do a variation of North by Northwest or Notorious, spy-themed movies directed by Hitchcock starring Cary Grant. When told by Hitchcock's agent that Grant did not ask to see even one of Hitchcock's scripts Connery replied, "I'm not Cary Grant". Hitchcock and Connery got on well during filming. Connery also said that he was happy with the film "with certain reservations".

Hedren has claimed that Hitchcock made sexual overtures to her during the making of The Birds, and that while making Marnie, he "pressured her sexually all the more blatantly, crudely, and cruelly." Hedren did not yield to his advances. She asked to be released from her contract, but he refused.

=== Filming ===
In a making-of documentary for the DVD release, unit manager Hilton A. Green explains that shooting had been scheduled to begin on November 25, 1963, at Universal City Studios in California but had to be postponed because the nation was in mourning for John F. Kennedy, who had been assassinated three days before. Filming concluded on March 14, 1964.

=== Music ===
Hitchcock had noticed a strong similarity between Herrmann's score for Joy in the Morning and Marnie and believed that Herrmann was repeating himself. Herrmann's music for Marnie included excerpts in his special album for Decca Records. Lyrics were written to Herrmann's theme that were to be sung by Nat King Cole. Herrmann's later score for Truffaut's The Bride Wore Black (1968) also repeats the main theme in Marnie, although slightly altered in its harmony.

== Reception ==
Contemporary reviews were mixed. Eugene Archer of The New York Times wrote a lukewarm assessment, calling it "at once a fascinating study of a sexual relationship and the master's most disappointing film in years". Archer's main criticisms were "an inexplicably amateurish script" and the casting of "relative newcomers" Hedren and Connery in roles that "cry for the talents of Grace Kelly and Cary Grant". A review in Variety wrote that the opening was slow, but once it got going Hitchcock's story "generally keeps the action fairly fast-paced—provided audience can overlook certain puzzling aspects, such as why the lady became a thief—and gets strong performances from his two stars and other cast members". Philip K. Scheuer of the Los Angeles Times wrote: "As a story it seems naggingly improbable and, as drama, a nightmare from which the spectator constantly pulls away, struggling to wake up in a less disordered universe. No question, though, that it is at least fitfully effective". Edith Oliver of The New Yorker called the film "an idiotic and trashy movie with two terrible performances in the leading roles, and I had quite a good time watching it. There is something bracing about Hitchcock at work, even when he is at his worst". The Monthly Film Bulletin wrote that the film "opens quite brilliantly", but that "things get out of hand" after the marriage, "with both leading players floundering badly as Hitchcock piles up his demands on them". The review suggested that "the trouble seems to be that the film falls between the two stools of straight suspense (what is Marnie's secret?) and the full-dress character study that would only have been possible with a more experienced actress". The film ranked 3rd on Cahiers du Cinéma's Top 10 Films of the Year List in 1964.

Marnie's reputation would greatly improve years later. On Rotten Tomatoes it holds a 78% rating based on 45 reviews. The critical consensus reads: "A coolly constructed mystery revolving around a character who's inscrutable to a fault, Marnie finds Hitchcock luring audiences deeper into the dark". On Metacritic, the film has a weighted average score of 73 out of 100 based on 15 critics, indicating "generally favourable reviews". Dave Kehr wrote in The Chicago Reader that while the film was "universally despised on its first release, Marnie remains one of Alfred Hitchcock's greatest and darkest achievements" as "theme and technique meet on the highest level of film art". Richard Brody wrote in The New Yorker that he considered it "Hitchcock's best film". In her 2012 review of the film Emily Cleaver of The Guardian wrote: "The opening shots of Marnie are Hitchcock's ideal of visual storytelling at its purest, and the rest of the film is an underrated gem".

The film was a moderate box office success; it grossed $7 million in theatres on a budget of $3 million. In North America, it earned estimated rentals of $3,250,000. Marnie was the 22nd highest-grossing film of 1964.

In a making-of documentary on the DVD, Robin Wood, author of Hitchcock's Films Revisited, discusses the special effects of the film as having their roots in German Expressionism:

[Hitchcock] worked in German studios at first, in the silent period. Very early on when he started making films, he saw Fritz Lang's German silent films; he was enormously influenced by that, and Marnie is basically an expressionist film in many ways. Things like scarlet suffusions over the screen, back-projection and backdrops, artificial-looking thunderstorms—these are expressionist devices and one has to accept them. If one doesn't accept them then one doesn't understand and can't possibly like Hitchcock.

In the 2012 Sight & Sound poll of the greatest films ever made, Marnie received nine total votes—six (out of 846) from critics and three (out of 358) from directors. Marnie was ranked 47th in BBC's 2015 list of the 100 greatest American films.

Marnie continues to have its admirers. Actress Catherine Deneuve indicated that she would have loved to have played Marnie. Actress Naomi Watts dressed up as Hedren's Marnie (whose outfits were by Edith Head) for the March 2008 issue of Vanity Fair magazine.

Marnie has been described as a neo-noir film by some authors.

The background to Hedren's casting in the title role and some of the production challenges were explored in the 2012 made-for-television movie The Girl starring Sienna Miller as Hedren and Toby Jones as Hitchcock.

== See also ==
- List of American films of 1964
