= Rise of the Guardians (soundtrack) =

2012 film soundtrack album

Rise of the Guardians: Music From The Motion Picture

Film score by Alexandre Desplat
- Released: November 13, 2012
- Recorded: June–September 2012
- Venue: London
- Studios: Abbey Road Studios; AIR Studios (London); Studio Davout (Paris); Avatar Studios (New York)
- Genre: Film score
- Length: 67:47
- Label: Varèse Sarabande
- Producer: Alexandre Desplat

Alexandre Desplat chronology
Argo (2012)	Rise of the Guardians (2012)	Zero Dark Thirty (2012)

Rise of the Guardians: Music From The Motion Picture is the score album to the 2012 of the same name, composed by Alexandre Desplat. The film marked Desplat's maiden score for a computer-animated film as well as his DreamWorks' film, not to be scored by or have any involvement from either Hans Zimmer or his Remote Control Productions family of composers. (Note: The composers of Zimmer's Remote Control Productions company, mainly involve John Powell, Henry Jackman, Lorne Balfe, Harry Gregson-Williams or his brother Rupert Gregson-Williams. Powell and Harry, regularly scored for most of the DreamWorks projects.) The score was recorded at Abbey Road Studios and AIR Studios in London and features collaborations with London Symphony Orchestra (conducted by Desplat) and London Voices performing. In addition to Desplat's score, an original song "Still Dream" written by the film's screenwriter David Lindsay-Abaire and performed by soprano singer Renée Fleming, was featured in the film's end credits. Both Desplat's score and Fleming's original song was included in the film's score album, released by Varèse Sarabande on November 13, 2012, and received positive response praising Desplat's compositions.

== Development ==
"For me, Rise of the Guardians is actually a live action film. When you see it in 3D it actually takes you into a real world. The cinematography, the light, the way the actors play their roles... I thought I was watching a live action film; very quickly you forget its animation. Technically, of course with animation, there is more music, you need to fill the gaps. But for the most part it was very similar to a live action film."

— Desplat on the differences between scoring an animated film over live-action film.

Ramsey admired Desplat's work since Birth (2004), and wanted to work with him in his film. Desplat was then suggested by the creative head of DreamWorks Animation, Bill Damaschke after being considered for several of the projects. The music of Rise of the Guardians is "actually rather complex", where "there are clear lines you can follow, and melodies you can hum along to, but the orchestration is rather sophisticated". He referenced Mysterious Island (1961) as an example in which "the music was accessible but extremely demanding", and John Williams scores for Star Wars and Indiana Jones franchises were "sophisticated, complex, dissonant", but watched by all age groups.

Desplat called that "there is so much in this film, so many influences, and so much beauty in the way the camera moves. It's really a mix of many things", adding that the film influences from fine art, video art, literature and music. He praised Ramsey's vision, recalling that he brought a book for Gerhard Richter for referencing the film, when Desplat was set to begin film's music. Though the characters were incorporated from folklore and fairy tales, he did not influence from folk music in the period, but created new music for the characters. For Alec Baldwin, who plays Nicholas St. North (Santa Claus), Desplat felt that his vocals were one of the strong aspects for the film, which resulted him using a Russian instrument while riding a sleigh, hence he became a "Russian Santa Claus". Igor Stravinsky's "Firebird Suite" was integrated whenever North appears in the film.

"The delicacy and the subtlety of what he does, and the uniqueness of his orchestrations and arrangements I thought would be perfect for the movie. It's a big superhero epic, basically, but I was afraid that was all the music would be: another regurgitated rehash of that same old thing. What Alexandre brings is so much more unique, fine tuned and delicate. He also really embraced the fun of the movie. There are sequences in there that are almost Warner Bros cartoons. Alexandre is a really funny guy, with an impish sense of humour. He loved it, and jumped right into it."

— Ramsey on Desplat's involvement and his work in the film.

While recording the film's music, Ramsey used to whistle few themes while scoring the album, as "he grew up in a household with a lot of music" and added that Desplat asked him to play an instrument, which he agreed. He then played guitar for some of the scores, which he felt as a "huge compliment and really interesting", adding that "when I'm scoring a film, I can always tell if the director likes and understands music, because of the scenes themselves and the way they're edited. The flow and the pacing makes it easier for me to score, if the film has a musical feel to it. I just though that was interesting: there is an organic kind of feel to it that I guess a lot of comes from music."

The score was recorded in London at the AIR Studios and Abbey Road Studios, within three months beginning from June to September 2012, when the film was under post-production. The London Symphony Orchestra and London Voices performed the orchestra and choir, respectively for the film's score, with Desplat conducting. In addition to Desplat's score, an original song "Still Dream" written by David Lindsay-Abaire and performed by soprano Renée Fleming was featured in the film's end credits.

== Reception ==
Professional ratings
Review scores
Source	Rating
AllMusic	4/5 stars

James Southall of Movie Wave wrote "Desplat had worked in the fantasy genre before this score, of course – The Golden Compass (2007) was a wonderful piece of work, full of the rich depths of the wonderful source novel in a way that the film itself sadly wasn't, and it's a great shame that the composer never got the chance to complete that trilogy he had clearly planned out so carefully. Rise of the Guardians is a much lighter work than that but still a satisfying one – it has a terrific collection of themes – and it confirms the composer's credentials in this genre." Filmtracks.com wrote "Had the various phrases of "Still Dream" been condensed into an easier form and better integrated with the great potential of Jack's theme, Rise of the Guardians could have been a five-star score. But the elusiveness of these themes and that of Pitch, as well as the countering transparency of the overly-heroic Guardians identity and a very, very dry mix, leave a slight sense of dissatisfaction with the whole. One thing is certain, though: you can't question Desplat's chops in the children's genre from here forward."

The Joy of Movies wrote "Desplat's score has a childlike sense of wonder and innocence throughout. It has quite a gentle sound at times with many quick, light notes, which contrast with the occasional darker sounds of Pitch, and the quieter emotional tracks for Jack's backstory. In some ways, for better or for worse, it is a very classic sounding score for an animated film." James Christopher Monger of Allmusic wrote "the soundtrack for Dreamworks Animation's Rise of the Guardians is as spirited and surprising as it is refreshingly old-fashioned. Desplat must have tucked away some extra magic after completing the scores for the final two Harry Potter films, because his work here is steeped in Hogwarts-inspired whimsy." Reviewing the song "Still Dream", Monger called it as "a sweet and sentimental ballad performed by soprano Renée Fleming, sets the tone, suggesting a classic old-world Disney approach to the fable, but Desplat never lets things dissolve into treacle, providing a muscular main theme that, along with the main melody from "Still Dream" weaves itself throughout the film with a quaint yet confident majesty."

== Track listing ==
No.	Title	Writer(s)	Performer(s)	Length
1.	"Still Dream"	David Lindsay-Abaire	Renée Fleming	3:12
2.	"Calling The Guardians"			2:06
3.	"Alone In The World"			2:04
4.	"Fanfare Of The Elves"			0:53
5.	"Wind Take Me Home!"			1:28
6.	"Dreamsand"			2:03
7.	"Pitch On The Globe"			0:57
8.	"The Moon"			1:32
9.	"Snowballs"			1:31
10.	"Busy Workshop"			1:33
11.	"Sleigh Launch"			1:45
12.	"Nightmares Attack"			7:17
13.	"Tooth Collection"			2:22
14.	"Jamie's Bedroom"			2:31
15.	"Jack & Sandman"			4:18
16.	"Memorial"			1:21
17.	"Guardians Regroup"			0:58
18.	"Easter"			3:39
19.	"Jack Betrays"			3:20
20.	"Kids Stop Believing"			2:35
21.	"Jack's Memories"			2:24
22.	"Pitch At North Pole"			2:00
23.	"Jamie Believes"			3:01
24.	"Jack's Center"			4:52
25.	"Sandman Returns"			2:36
26.	"Dreamsand Miracles"			2:18
27.	"Oath Of The Guardians"			3:11
Total length:				67:47

== Charts ==
Chart (2012)	Peak position
UK Soundtrack Albums (OCC)	34
US Billboard 200	108
US Soundtrack Albums (Billboard)	20

== Accolades ==
Award	Date of ceremony	Category	Recipient(s)	Result	Ref.
Annie Awards	February 2, 2013	Outstanding Achievement for Music in a Feature Production	Alexandre Desplat	Nominated	
BMI Film & TV Awards	May 15, 2013	BMI Film Music Awards	Alexandre Desplat (Note: Also for Argo (2012))	Won	
International Film Music Critics Association Awards	January 11, 2013	Film Composer of the Year	Alexandre Desplat	Nominated	
International Film Music Critics Association Awards	January 11, 2013	Best Original Score for an Animated Film	Alexandre Desplat	Won	
World Soundtrack Awards	October 19, 2013	Soundtrack Composer of the Year	Alexandre Desplat (Note: Also for Argo (2012), Renoir (2012), and Zero Dark Thirty (2012))	Nominated	

== Personnel ==
Credits adapted from CD liner notes.

Production

- Music producer – Alexandre Desplat
- Programming – Romain Allender, Xavier Forcioli
- Recording – Jonathan Allen, Richard King, Andrew Dudman
- Editing – Joe E. Rand, Barbara McDermott
- Mixing – Andrew Dudman, Joel Iwataki
- Mastering – Patricia Sullivan

Technical

- Music co-ordinator – Roger Tang
- Copyist – Mark Graham
- Score engineer – Alex Firla
- Assistant engineer – Paul Pritchard, Fiona Cruickshank, Jack Sugden, John Prestage, Matt Jones, Paul Pritchard
- Soundtrack executive producer – Robert Townson
- Studio manager – Alison Burton, Colette Barber

London Symphony Orchestra

- Conductor – Alexandre Desplat
- Orchestration – Alexandre Desplat, Conrad Pope
- Additional orchestration – Bill Newlin, Clifford J. Tasner, Nan Schwartz
- Orchestra leader – Carmine Lauri
- Contractor – Marc Stevens, Sue Mallet
- Technician – Chris Cozens

London Voices

- Conductor – Terry Edwards

Instruments

- Cimbalom – Lurie Morar
- Guitar – Huw Davies
- Percussion – Paul Clarvis
- Piano – Dave Arch

Management

- Music clearance – Julie Butchko
- Music business affairs – Dan Butler, Jennifer Schiller, Liz McNicoll
- Executive in charge of music – Sunny Park
- Music consultant – Charlene Ann Huang
- Marketing – Susan Thampi
