= 70th Golden Globe Awards =

Film award ceremony in 2013

- Date: January 13, 2013
- Site: The Beverly Hilton, Beverly Hills, California, U.S.
- Hosted by: Tina Fey; Amy Poehler
- Directed by: Louis J. Horvitz

Highlights
- Best Film: Drama: Argo
- Best Film: Musical or Comedy: Les Misérables
- Best Drama Series: Homeland
- Best Musical or Comedy Series: Girls
- Best Miniseries or Television movie: Game Change

Television coverage
- Network: NBC
- Ratings: 19.7 million 6.4% (Nielsen ratings)

The 70th Golden Globe Awards honoring the best in film and television of 2012, was broadcast live from the Beverly Hilton Hotel in Beverly Hills, California on January 13, 2013, by NBC. Tina Fey and Amy Poehler co-hosted. Nominations were announced on December 13 by Jessica Alba, Megan Fox and Ed Helms. The Cecil B. DeMille Award, honoring the lifetime achievements of actors and filmmakers, was announced on November 1, 2012, with Jodie Foster being the latest recipient of that trophy. The ceremony was produced by Dick Clark Productions in association with the Hollywood Foreign Press Association.

== Winners and nominees ==
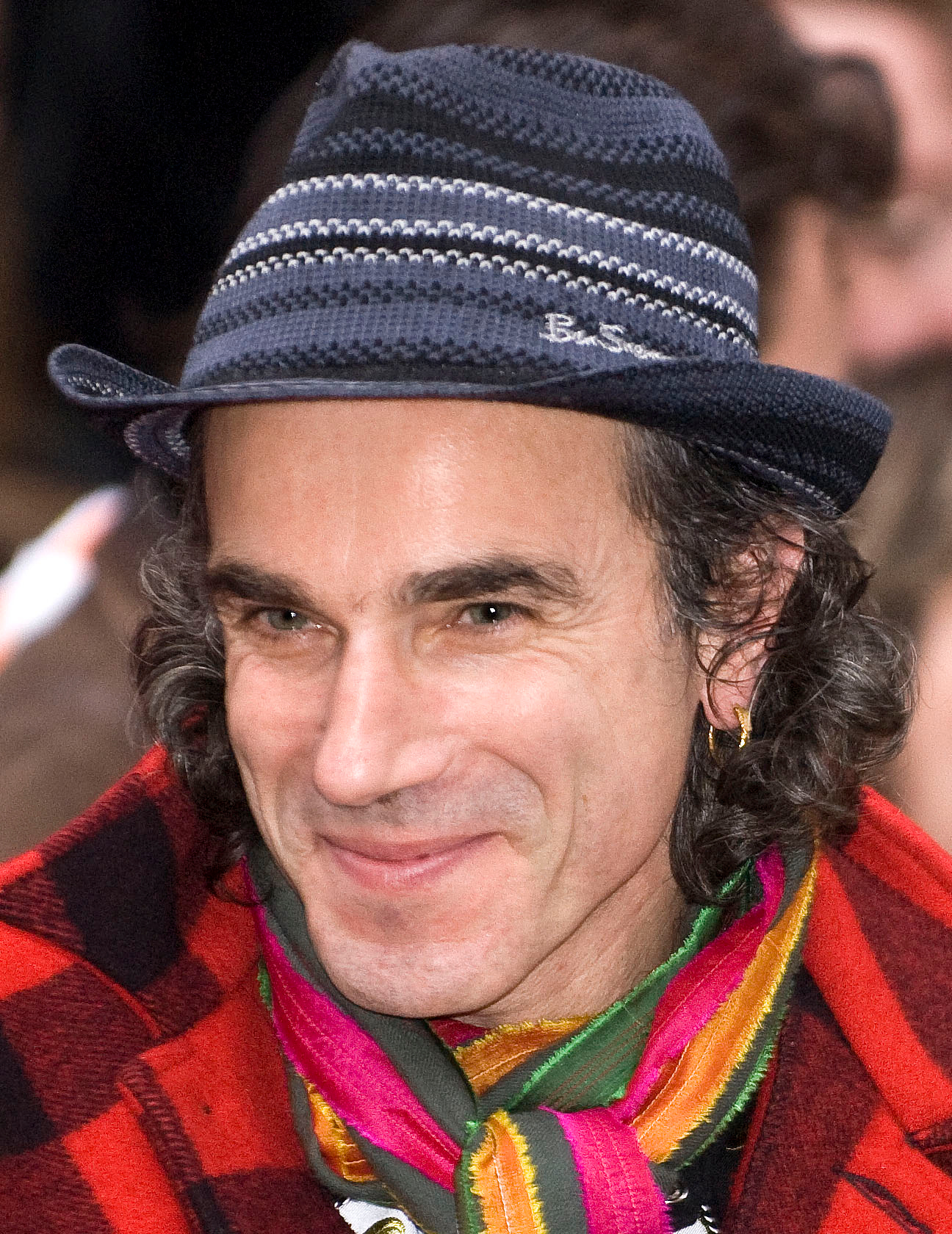
Daniel Day-Lewis, Best Actor in a Motion Picture – Drama winner

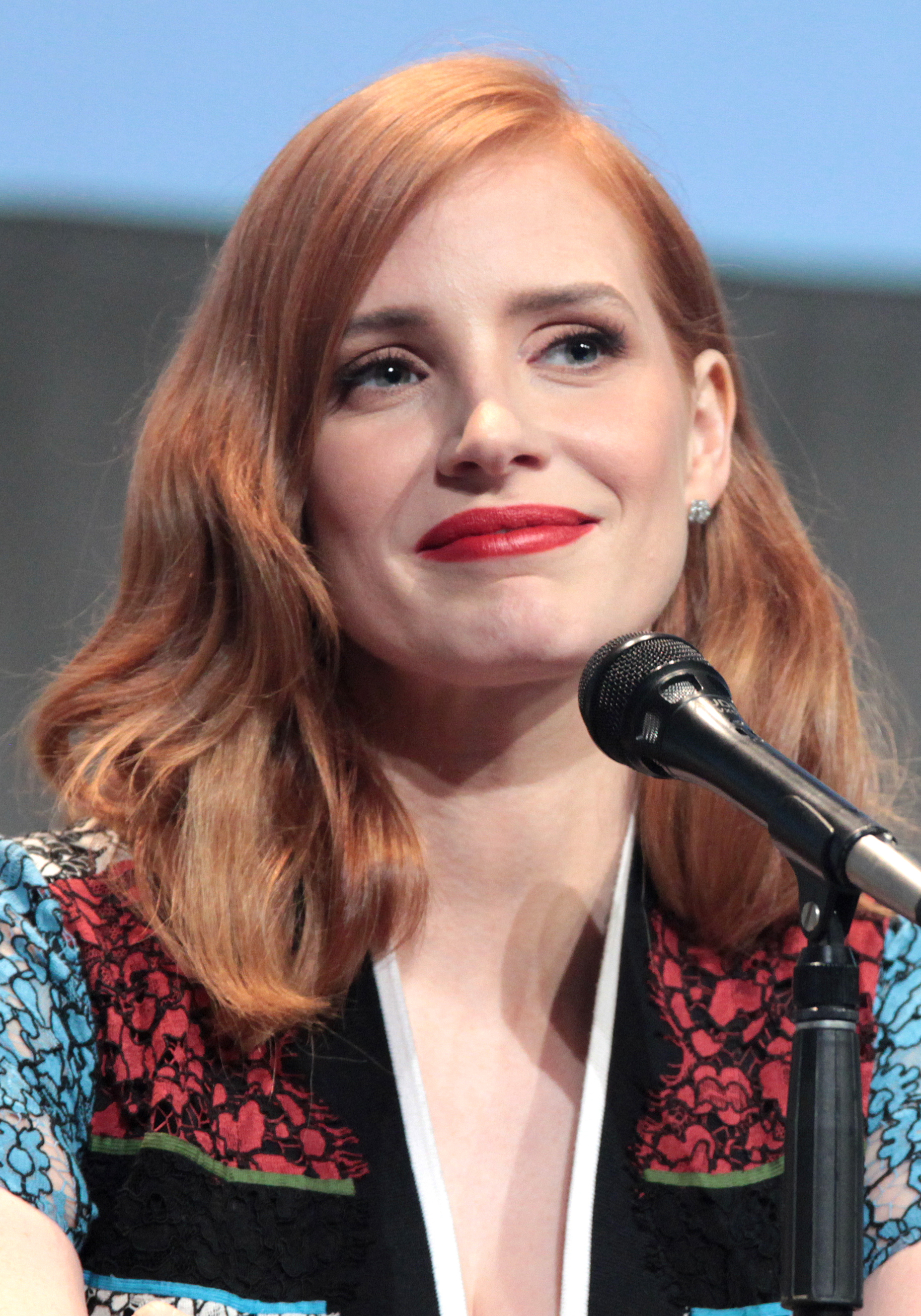
Jessica Chastain, Best Actress in a Motion Picture – Drama winner

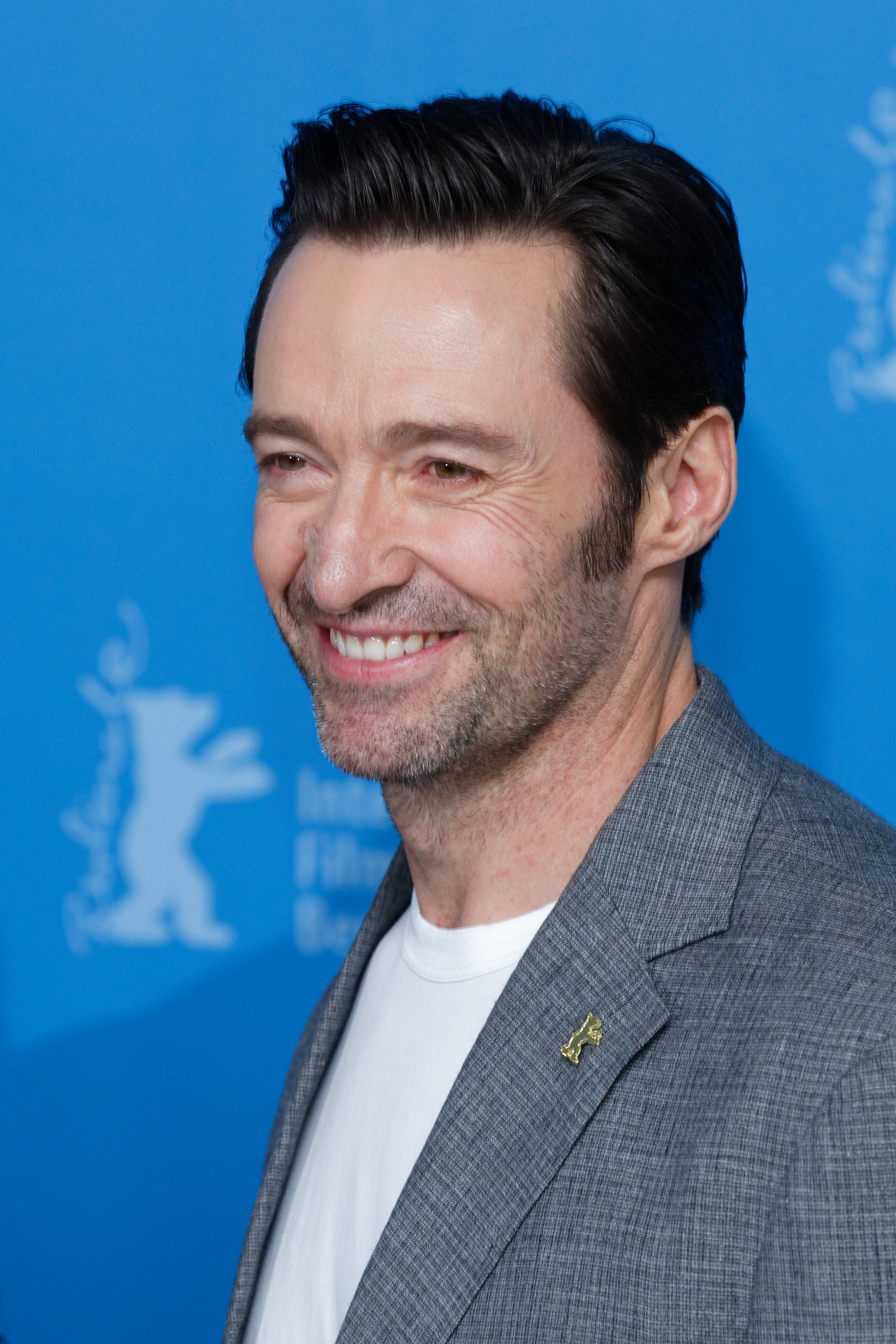
Hugh Jackman, Best Actor in a Motion Picture – Musical or Comedy winner

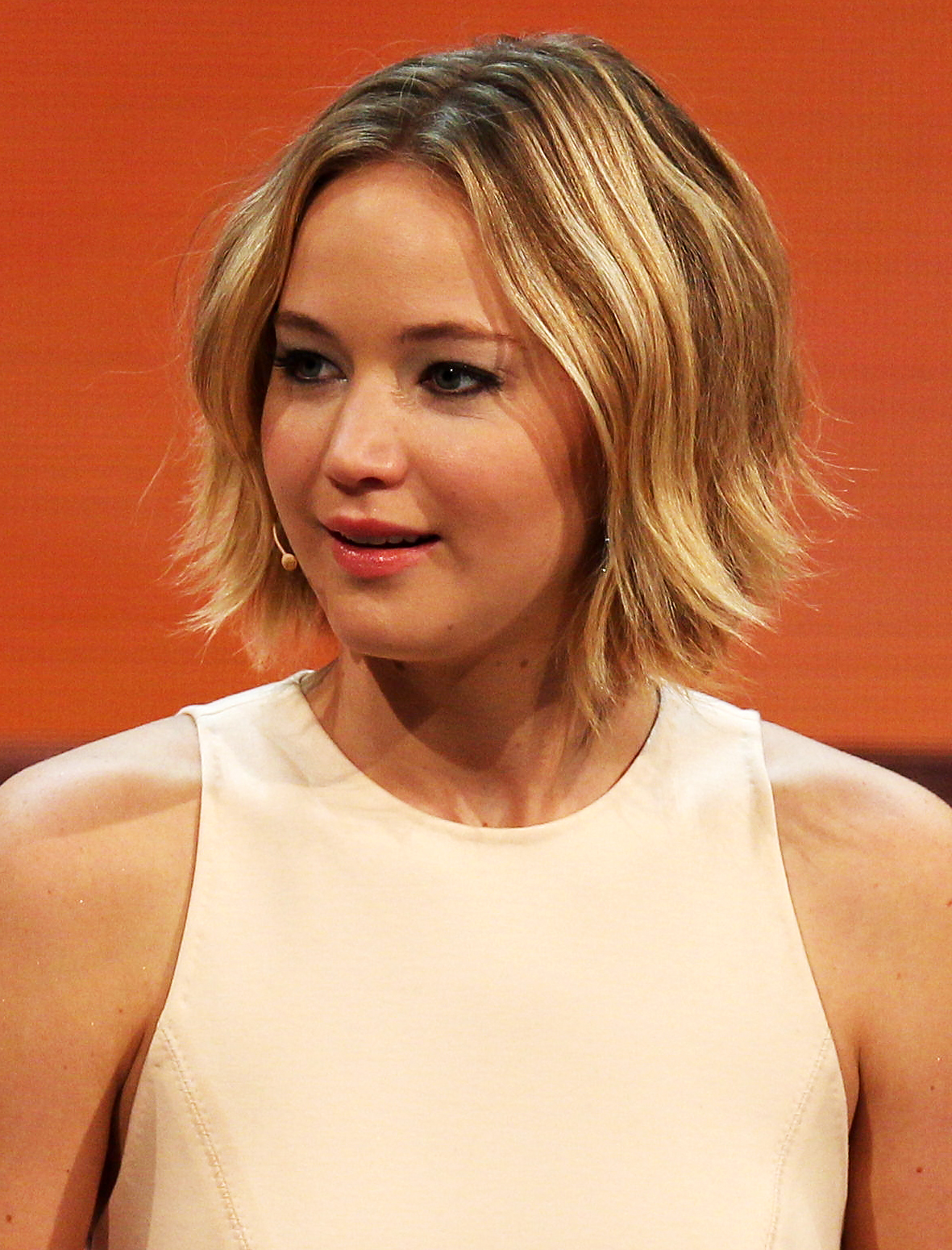
Jennifer Lawrence, Best Actress in a Motion Picture – Musical or Comedy winner

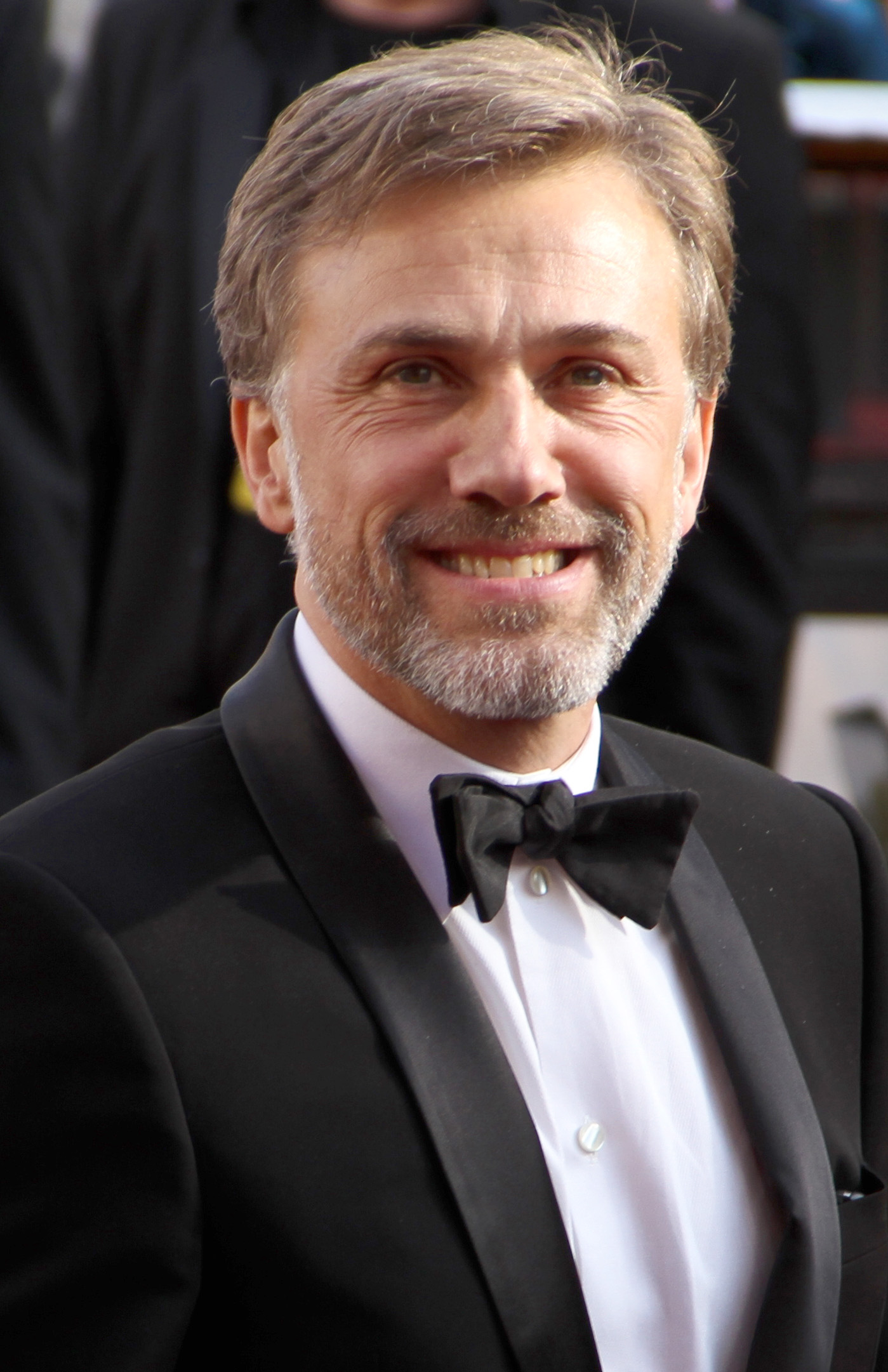
Christoph Waltz, Best Supporting Actor winner

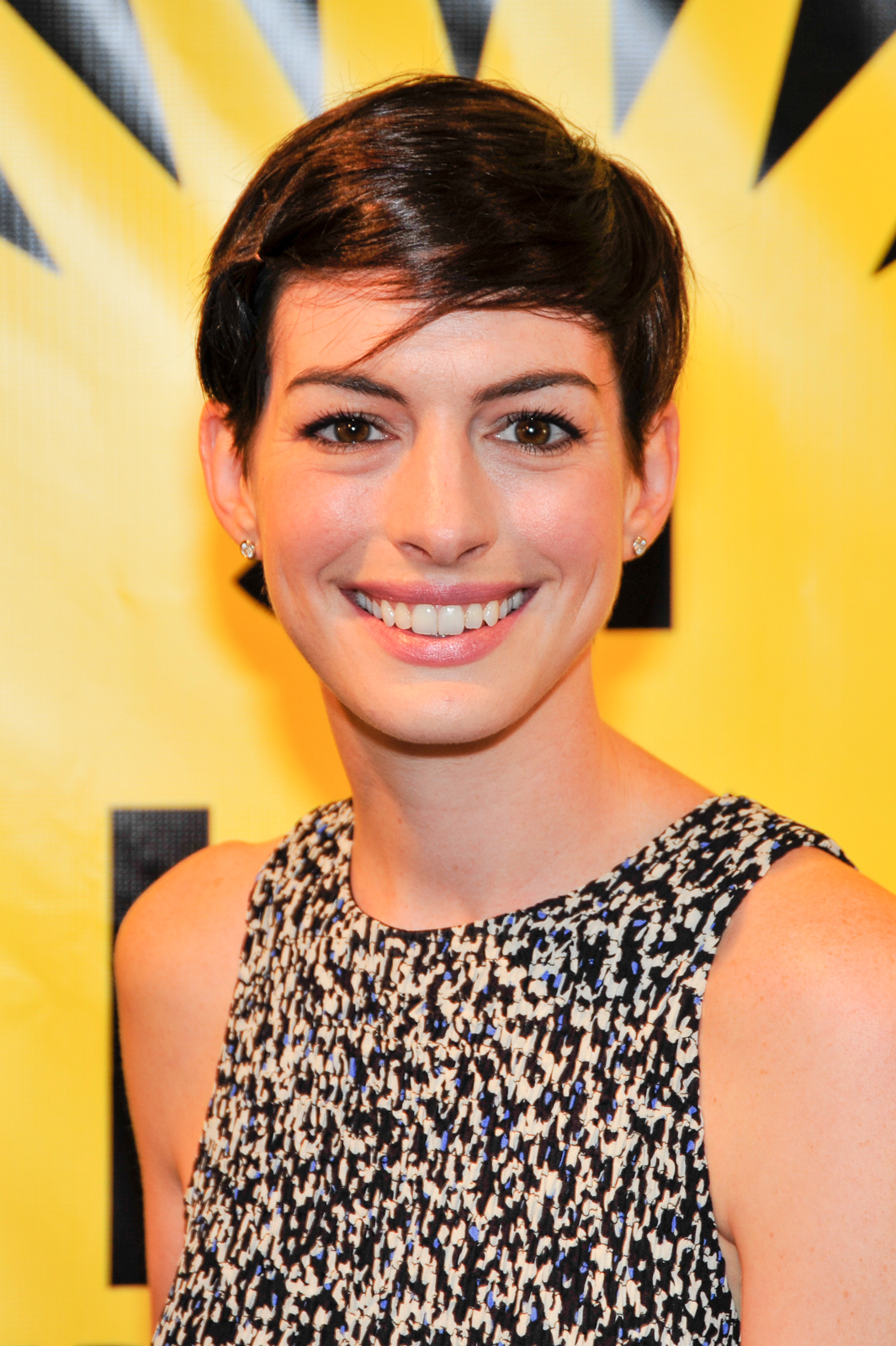
Anne Hathaway, Best Supporting Actress winner

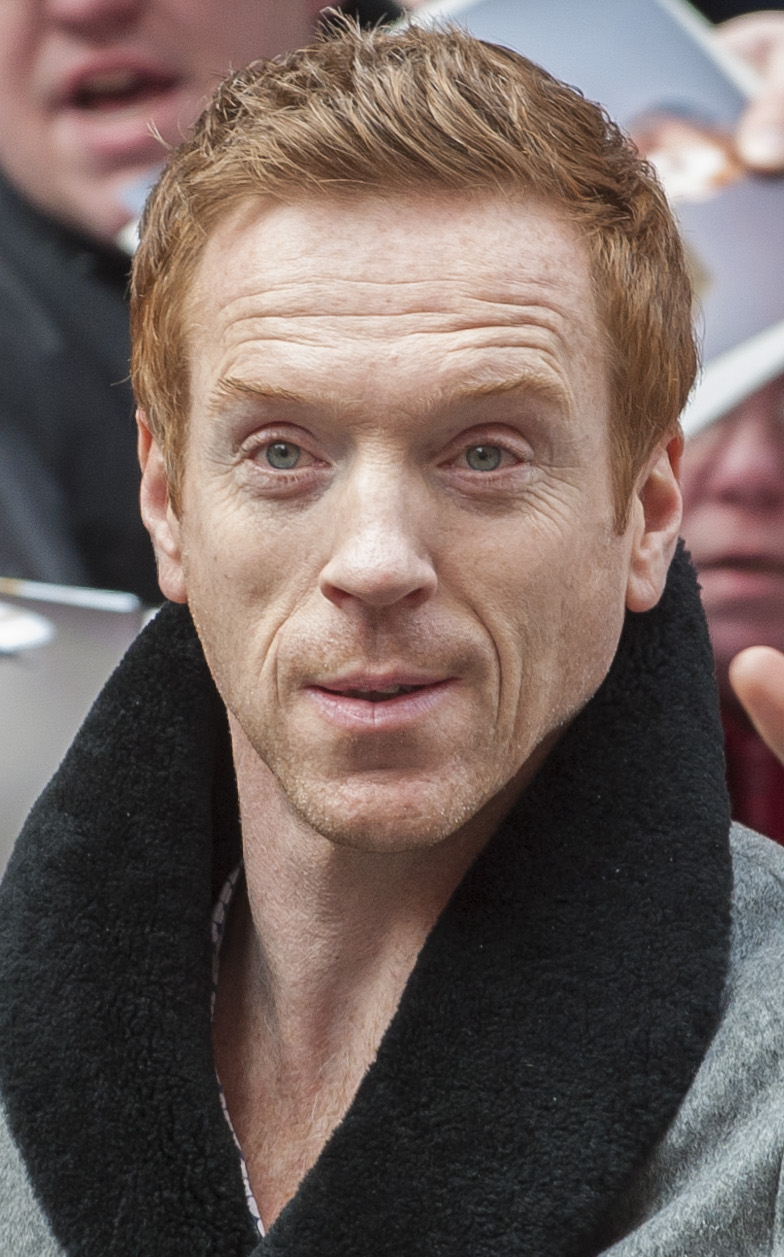
Damian Lewis, Best Actor in a Television Series – Drama winner

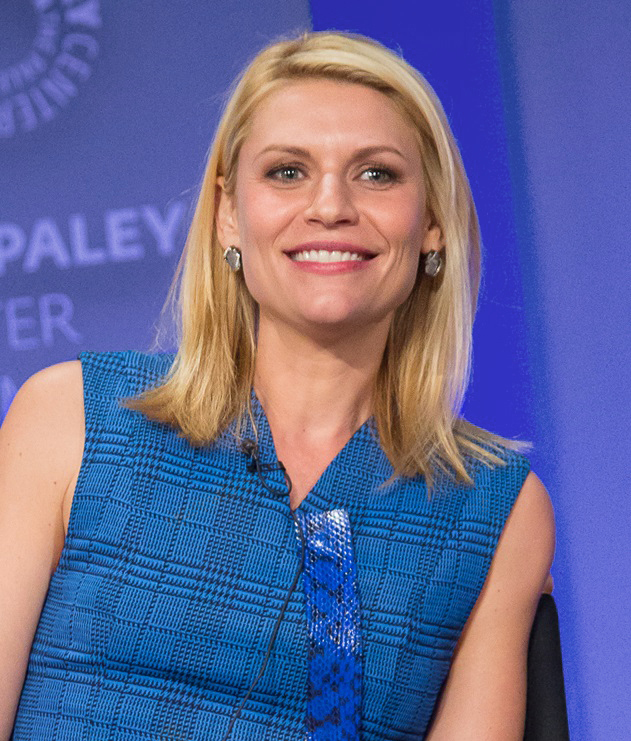
Claire Danes, Best Actress in a Television Series – Drama winner

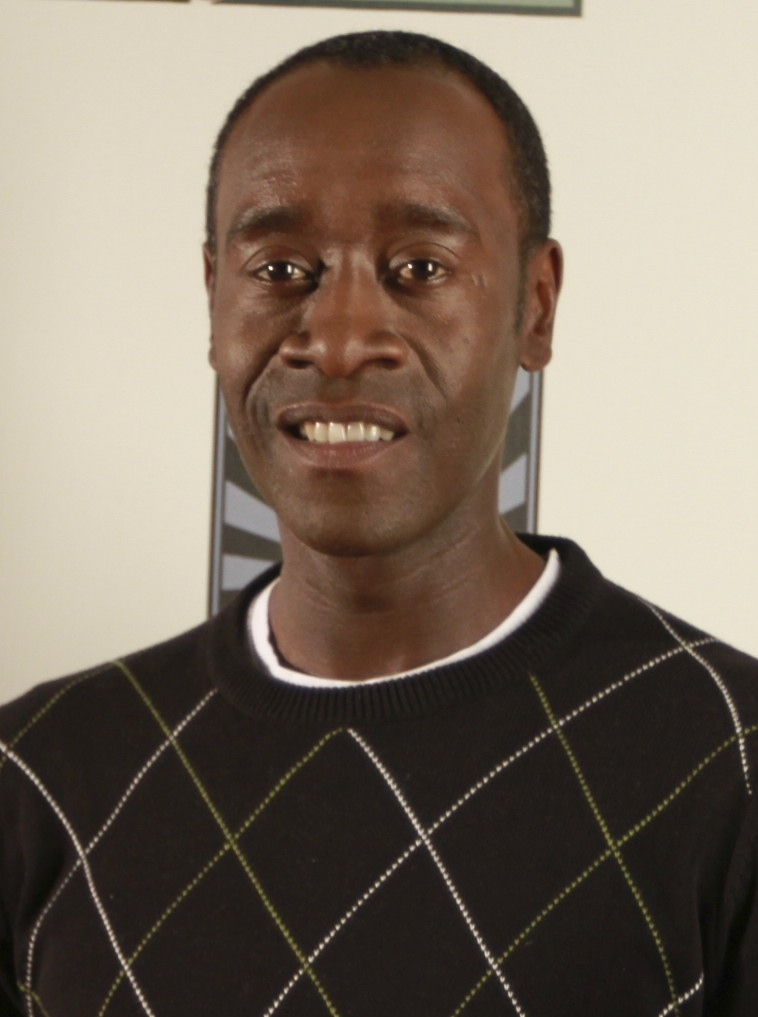
Don Cheadle, Best Actor in a Television Series – Musical or Comedy winner

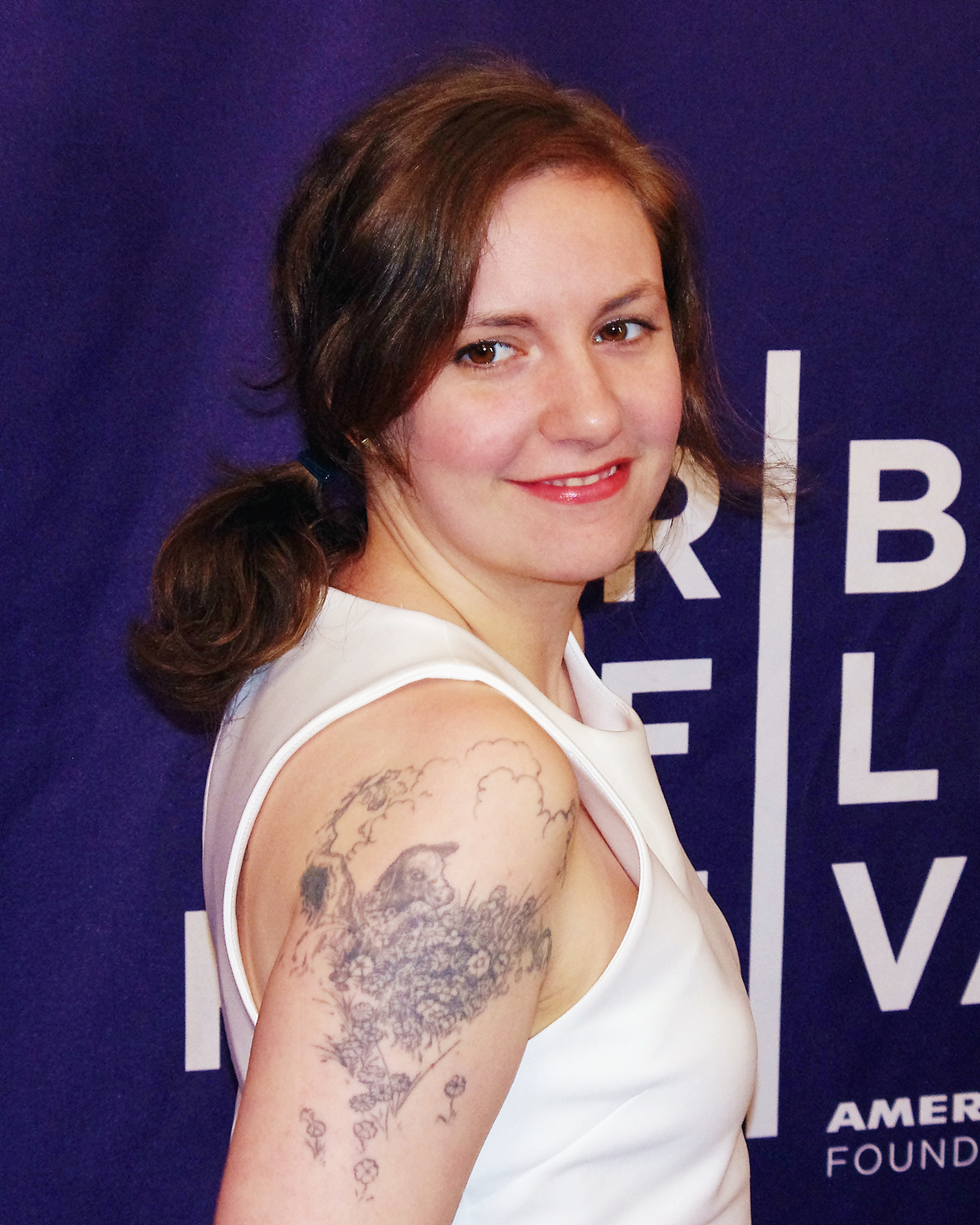
Lena Dunham, Best Actress in a Television Series – Musical or Comedy winner

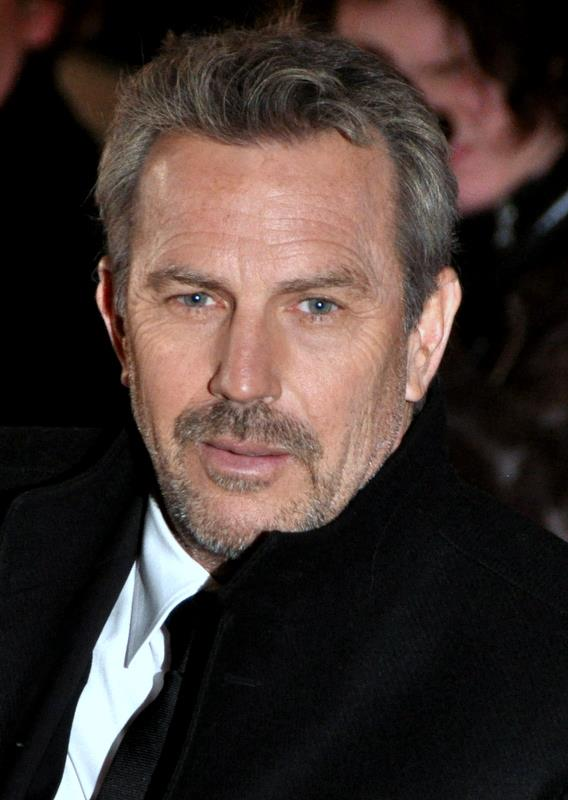
Kevin Costner, Best Actor in a Miniseries or Television Film winner

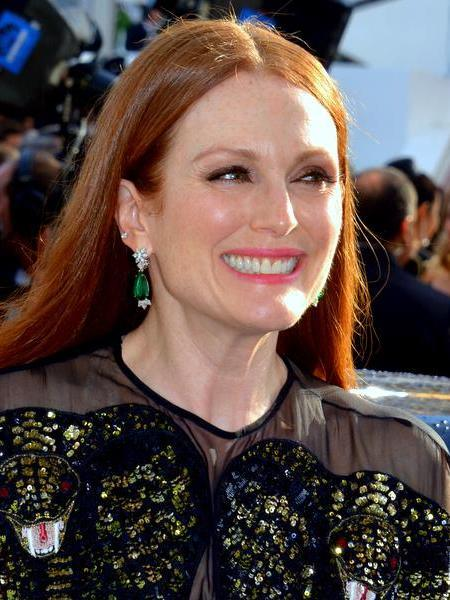
Julianne Moore, Best Actress in a Miniseries or Television Film winner

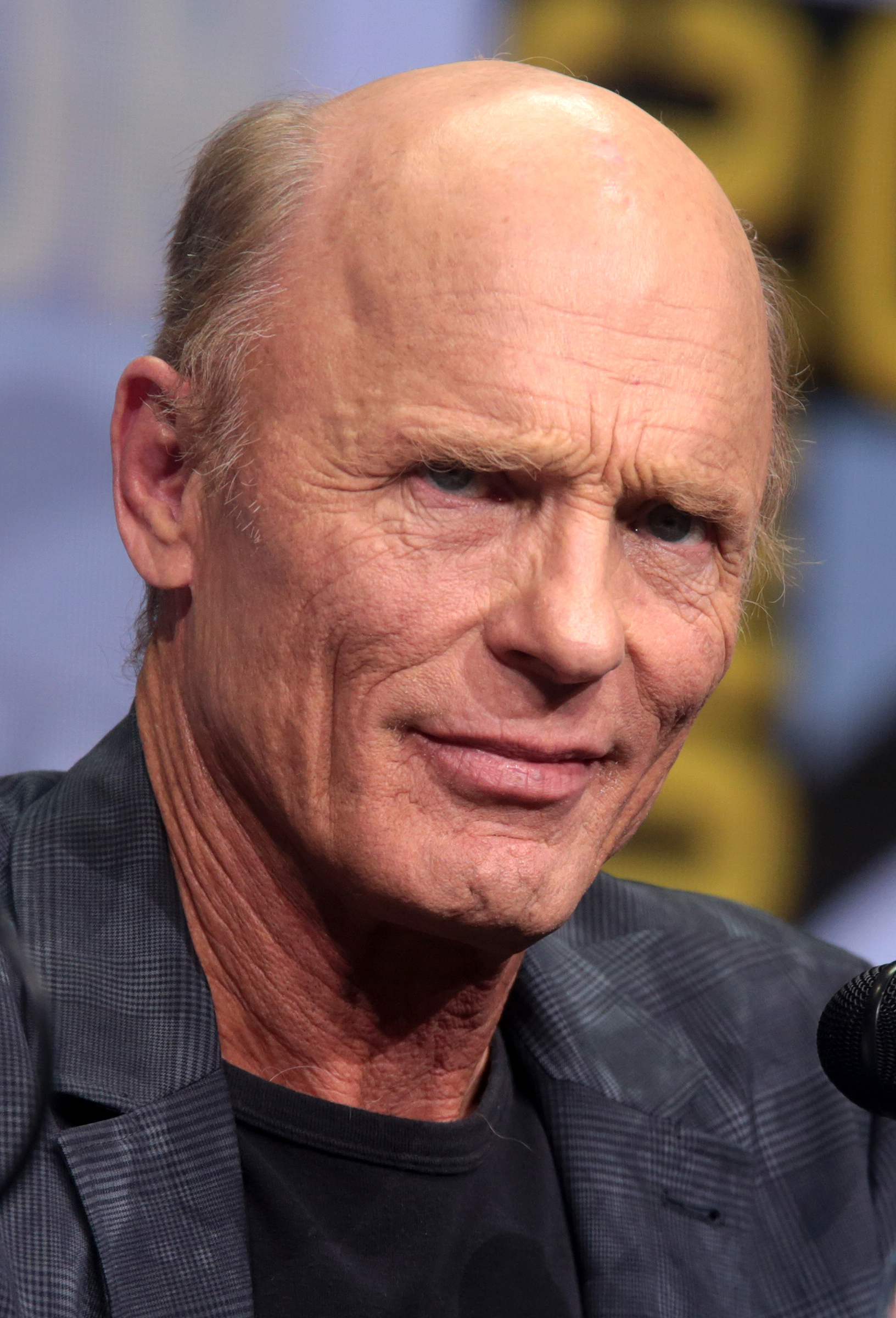
Ed Harris, Best Supporting Actor in a Series, Miniseries, or Television Film winner

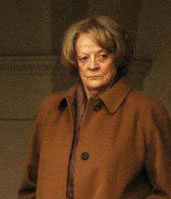
Maggie Smith, Best Supporting Actress in a Series, Miniseries, or Television Film winner

These are the nominees for the 70th Golden Globe Awards. Winners are listed at the top of each list.

=== Film ===
Best Motion Picture
| Drama | Musical or Comedy |
|---|---|
| Argo; Django Unchained; Life of Pi; Lincoln; Zero Dark Thirty | Les Misérables; The Best Exotic Marigold Hotel; Moonrise Kingdom; Salmon Fishing in the Yemen; Silver Linings Playbook |
Best Performance in a Motion Picture – Drama
| Actor | Actress |
| Daniel Day-Lewis – Lincoln as Abraham Lincoln; Richard Gere – Arbitrage as Robert Miller; John Hawkes – The Sessions as Mark O'Brien; Joaquin Phoenix – The Master as Freddie Quell; Denzel Washington – Flight as William "Whip" Whitaker, Sr. | Jessica Chastain – Zero Dark Thirty as Maya; Marion Cotillard – Rust and Bone as Stéphanie; Helen Mirren – Hitchcock as Alma Reville; Naomi Watts – The Impossible as Maria Bennett; Rachel Weisz – The Deep Blue Sea as Hester Collyer |
Best Performance in a Motion Picture – Musical or Comedy
| Actor | Actress |
| Hugh Jackman – Les Misérables as Jean Valjean; Jack Black – Bernie as Bernie Tiede; Bradley Cooper – Silver Linings Playbook as Pat Solitano; Ewan McGregor – Salmon Fishing in the Yemen as Alfred "Fred" Jones; Bill Murray – Hyde Park on Hudson as Franklin D. Roosevelt | Jennifer Lawrence – Silver Linings Playbook as Tiffany Maxwell; Emily Blunt – Salmon Fishing in the Yemen as Harriet Chetwode-Talbot; Judi Dench – The Best Exotic Marigold Hotel as Evelyn Greenslade; Maggie Smith – Quartet as Jean Horton; Meryl Streep – Hope Springs as Kay Soames |
Best Supporting Performance in a Motion Picture – Drama, Musical or Comedy
| Supporting Actor | Supporting Actress |
| Christoph Waltz – Django Unchained as Dr. King Schultz; Alan Arkin – Argo as Lester Siegel; Leonardo DiCaprio – Django Unchained as Calvin J. Candie; Philip Seymour Hoffman – The Master as Lancaster Dodd; Tommy Lee Jones – Lincoln as Thaddeus Stevens | Anne Hathaway – Les Misérables as Fantine; Amy Adams – The Master as Peggy Dodd; Sally Field – Lincoln as Mary Todd Lincoln; Helen Hunt – The Sessions as Cheryl Cohen Greene; Nicole Kidman – The Paperboy as Charlotte Bless |
| Best Director | Best Screenplay |
| Ben Affleck – Argo; Kathryn Bigelow – Zero Dark Thirty; Ang Lee – Life of Pi; Steven Spielberg – Lincoln; Quentin Tarantino – Django Unchained | Quentin Tarantino – Django Unchained; Chris Terrio – Argo; Tony Kushner – Lincoln; David O. Russell – Silver Linings Playbook; Mark Boal – Zero Dark Thirty |
| Best Original Score | Best Original Song |
| Mychael Danna – Life of Pi; Dario Marianelli – Anna Karenina; Alexandre Desplat – Argo; John Williams – Lincoln; Tom Tykwer, Johnny Klimek, and Reinhold Heil – Cloud Atlas | "Skyfall" (Adele and Paul Epworth) – Skyfall; "For You" (Keith Urban and Michael McDevitt) – Act of Valor; "Not Running Anymore" (Jon Bon Jovi) – Stand Up Guys; "Safe & Sound" (Taylor Swift, Joy Williams, John Paul White, T-Bone Burnett) – The Hunger Games; "Suddenly" (Claude-Michel Schönberg, Alain Boublil and Herbert Kretzmer) – Les Misérables |
| Best Animated Feature Film | Best Foreign Language Film |
| Brave; Frankenweenie; Hotel Transylvania; Rise of the Guardians; Wreck-It Ralph | Amour (Austria); A Royal Affair (Denmark); The Intouchables (France); Kon-Tiki (Norway); Rust and Bone (France) |

==== Films with multiple nominations ====
The following 12 films received multiple nominations:

| Nominations | Film |
|---|---|
| 7 | Lincoln |
| 5 | Argo |
| 5 | Django Unchained |
| 4 | Les Misérables |
| 4 | Silver Linings Playbook |
| 4 | Zero Dark Thirty |
| 3 | Life of Pi |
| 3 | Salmon Fishing in the Yemen |
| 3 | The Master |
| 2 | Rust and Bone |
| 2 | The Best Exotic Marigold Hotel |
| 2 | The Sessions |

=== Films with multiple wins ===
The following 3 films received multiple wins:

| Wins | Films |
|---|---|
| 3 | Les Misérables |
| 2 | Argo |
| 2 | Django Unchained |

=== Television ===
Best Series
| Drama | Musical or Comedy |
|---|---|
| Homeland (Showtime); Breaking Bad (AMC); Boardwalk Empire (HBO); Downton Abbey (PBS); The Newsroom (HBO) | Girls (HBO); The Big Bang Theory (CBS); Episodes (Showtime); Modern Family (ABC); Smash (NBC) |
Best Performance in a Television Series – Drama
| Actor | Actress |
| Damian Lewis – Homeland (Showtime) as Nicholas Brody; Steve Buscemi – Boardwalk Empire (HBO) as Nucky Thompson; Bryan Cranston – Breaking Bad (AMC) as Walter White; Jeff Daniels – The Newsroom (HBO) as Will McAvoy; Jon Hamm – Mad Men (AMC) as Don Draper | Claire Danes – Homeland (Showtime) as Carrie Mathison; Connie Britton – Nashville (ABC) as Rayna Jaymes; Glenn Close – Damages (FX) as Patty Hewes; Michelle Dockery – Downton Abbey (PBS) as Lady Mary Josephine Crawley; Julianna Margulies – The Good Wife (CBS) as Alicia Florrick |
Best Performance in a Television Series – Musical or Comedy
| Actor | Actress |
| Don Cheadle – House of Lies (Showtime) as Marty Kaan; Alec Baldwin – 30 Rock (NBC) as Jack Donaghy; Louis C.K. – Louie (FX) as Louie; Matt LeBlanc – Episodes (Showtime) as Matt LeBlanc; Jim Parsons – The Big Bang Theory (CBS) as Sheldon Cooper | Lena Dunham – Girls (HBO) as Hannah Horvath; Zooey Deschanel – New Girl (Fox) as Jessica "Jess" Day; Tina Fey – 30 Rock (NBC) as Liz Lemon; Julia Louis-Dreyfus – Veep (HBO) as Vice President Selina Meyer; Amy Poehler – Parks and Recreation (NBC) as Leslie Knope |
Best Performance in a Miniseries or Television Film
| Actor | Actress |
| Kevin Costner – Hatfields & McCoys (History) as Devil Anse Hatfield; Benedict Cumberbatch – Sherlock (PBS) as Sherlock Holmes; Woody Harrelson – Game Change (HBO) as Steve Schmidt; Toby Jones – The Girl (HBO) as Alfred Hitchcock; Clive Owen – Hemingway & Gellhorn (History) as Ernest Hemingway | Julianne Moore – Game Change (HBO) as Sarah Palin; Nicole Kidman – Hemingway & Gellhorn (HBO) as Martha Gellhorn; Jessica Lange – American Horror Story: Asylum (FX) as Sister Jude Martin / Judy Martin; Sienna Miller – The Girl (HBO) as Tippi Hedren; Sigourney Weaver – Political Animals (USA Network) as Elaine Barrish |
Best Supporting Performance in a Series, Miniseries, or Television Film
| Supporting Actor | Supporting Actress |
| Ed Harris – Game Change (HBO) as John McCain; Max Greenfield – New Girl (Fox) as Schmidt; Danny Huston – Magic City (Starz) as Ben "The Butcher" Diamond; Mandy Patinkin – Homeland (Showtime) as Saul Berenson; Eric Stonestreet – Modern Family (ABC) as Cameron Tucker | Maggie Smith – Downton Abbey (PBS) as Violet, Dowager Countess of Grantham; Hayden Panettiere – Nashville (ABC) as Juliette Barnes; Archie Panjabi – The Good Wife (CBS) as Kalinda Sharma; Sarah Paulson – Game Change (HBO) as Nicolle Wallace; Sofía Vergara – Modern Family (ABC) as Gloria Delgado-Pritchett |
Best Miniseries or Television Film
Game Change (HBO); The Girl (HBO); The Hour (BBC America); Hatfields & McCoys (History); Political Animals (USA Network)

=== Series with multiple nominations ===
The following 18 series received multiple nominations:

| Nominations | Series |
|---|---|
| 5 | Game Change |
| 4 | Homeland |
| 3 | Downton Abbey |
| 3 | The Girl |
| 3 | Modern Family |
| 2 | 30 Rock |
| 2 | The Big Bang Theory |
| 2 | Boardwalk Empire |
| 2 | Breaking Bad |
| 2 | Episodes |
| 2 | Girls |
| 2 | The Good Wife |
| 2 | Hatfields & McCoys |
| 2 | Hemingway & Gellhorn |
| 2 | Nashville |
| 2 | New Girl |
| 2 | The Newsroom |
| 2 | Political Animals |

=== Series with multiple wins ===
The following 3 series received multiple wins:

| Nominations | Series |
|---|---|
| 3 | Game Change |
| 3 | Homeland |
| 2 | Girls |

== Presenters ==
- Jessica Alba and Kiefer Sutherland with Best Actor – Miniseries or Television Film
- Aziz Ansari and Jason Bateman with Best Actress in a Television Series – Comedy or Musical
- Christian Bale introduced Silver Linings Playbook
- Kristen Bell and John Krasinski with Best Supporting Actor – Series, Miniseries or Television Film
- Halle Berry with Best Director – Motion Picture
- Josh Brolin introduced Moonrise Kingdom
- Don Cheadle and Eva Longoria with Mr. and Miss Golden Globe, Best Actress – Miniseries or Television Film and Best Miniseries or Television Film
- Bill Clinton introduced Lincoln
- George Clooney with Best Actress in a Motion Picture – Drama and Best Actor in a Motion Picture – Drama
- Sacha Baron Cohen with Best Animated Feature Film
- Bradley Cooper and Kate Hudson with Best Supporting Actor – Motion Picture
- Rosario Dawson introduced The Best Exotic Marigold Hotel
- Robert Downey Jr. with the Cecil B. DeMille Award
- Jimmy Fallon and Jay Leno with Best Television Series – Comedy or Musical
- Will Ferrell and Kristen Wiig with Best Actress in a Motion Picture – Musical or Comedy
- Nathan Fillion and Lea Michele with Best Actress in a Television Series – Drama
- Megan Fox and Jonah Hill with Best Supporting Actress – Motion Picture
- Jamie Foxx introduced Django Unchained
- Jennifer Garner with Best Actor in a Motion Picture – Musical or Comedy
- John Goodman and Tony Mendez introduced Argo
- Salma Hayek and Paul Rudd with Best Actor in a Television Series – Drama and Best Television Series – Drama
- Dustin Hoffman with Best Motion Picture – Musical or Comedy
- Jeremy Irons introduced Salmon Fishing in the Yemen
- Lucy Liu and Debra Messing with Best Actor in a Television Series – Comedy or Musical
- Jennifer Lopez and Jason Statham with Best Original Score and Best Original Song
- Robert Pattinson and Amanda Seyfried with Best Screenplay
- Dennis Quaid and Kerry Washington with Best Supporting Actress – Series, Miniseries or Television Film
- Jeremy Renner introduced Zero Dark Thirty
- Julia Roberts with Best Motion Picture – Drama
- Liev Schreiber introduced Life of Pi
- Arnold Schwarzenegger and Sylvester Stallone with Best Foreign Language Film
- Catherine Zeta-Jones introduced Les Misérables
