= Isabel Leonard =

American mezzo-soprano (born 1982)

Isabel Leonard (born February 18, 1982) is an American operatic mezzo-soprano based in New York City. She is of Argentine ancestry on her mother's side.

== Education ==
Leonard was born in New York City. For five years she sang with the Manhattan School of Music children's chorus. She attended the Joffrey Ballet School. She is a graduate of The Cathedral School of St. John the Divine and the Fiorello H. LaGuardia High School of Music & Art and Performing Arts. She earned her Bachelor of Music and Master of Music degrees at the Juilliard School, where she was a pupil of Edith Bers. She has also studied with Marilyn Horne, Brian Zeger, Warren Jones, and Margo Garrett. She is a 2005 winner of the Marilyn Horne Foundation Vocal Competition. In 2006, she received The Licia Albanese-Puccini Foundation Award. She was also chosen as a recipient of a Movado Future Legends award in 2006. In 2013, she received the Richard Tucker Music Foundation Award.

== Career ==
In New York, Leonard has performed with the Chamber Music Society of Lincoln Center and with the Juilliard Opera Center. Her first appearance with the New York Philharmonic was in a concert version of Leonard Bernstein's Candide, and she later sang the part of the Squirrel in L'enfant et les sortilèges in concert with the orchestra and Lorin Maazel. In February 2007, Leonard made her professional operatic stage debut as Stéphano in Roméo et Juliette. In September 2007, she made her Metropolitan Opera debut in the same role. Leonard made her debut with Santa Fe Opera as Cherubino in 2008. Her commercial recordings include a DVD recording for Euroarts as Dorabella in the 2009 Salzburg Festival production of Così fan tutte. On April 26, 2014, Leonard sang the role of Dorabella in a performance at the Metropolitan Opera that was transmitted worldwide as part of the Metropolitan Opera Live in HD program. In February 2011, Leonard made her Vienna State Opera debut singing Cherubino in Le nozze di Figaro, returning to the venue in January 2012 as Rosina in Il barbiere di Siviglia. 2014 to 2016 Leonard and Sharon Isbin performed a well-received series of eleven soprano/guitar-duet recitals, including at Zankel Hall (Carnegie Hall). Leonard sang the lead role in the American premiere of Marnie at the Met in New York in October 2018.

In 2023, she made her film debut in She Came to Me as Chloe, the in-demand lead of a new opera within the movie. Later that year, Leonard appeared in the movie Maestro singing with Rosa Feola in the finale of Gustav Mahler's Symphony No. 2 in C minor "Resurrection", in a reproduction of the famed 1973 performance led by Leonard Bernstein in Ely Cathedral.

== Awards ==
Leonard won two Grammy Awards for Best Opera Recording: in 2014 for Thomas Adès' The Tempest, and in 2016 for Maurice Ravel's L'enfant et les sortilèges. In 2021 she won the Grammy Award for Best Classical Compendium for From the Diary of Anne Frank & Meditations on Rilke, conducted by Michael Tilson Thomas.

Leonard has served on the Board of Trustees as an Artist Trustee at Carnegie Hall.

== Personal life ==
Her grandfather Carlos Guimard (1913–1998) was an Argentine chess grandmaster. Leonard married baritone Teddy Tahu Rhodes in December 2008; they divorced around 2013. Leonard raises their son, Teo, born 17 May 2010.

== Repertory ==
- Stéphano in Roméo et Juliette, 2007 (Met debut)
- Rosina in The Barber of Seville
- Angelina (Cinderella) in La Cenerentola
- Cherubino in Le nozze di Figaro
- Sextus in Giulio Cesare, 2011
- Miranda in The Tempest
- Dorabella in Così fan tutte
- Zerlina in Don Giovanni
- Charlotte in Werther
- Donna Elvira in Don Giovanni 2017 (Avec le Cercle d'Harmonie, Director Jeremie Rhonen Festival d'art lyrique D'Aix en Provence France July 2017)
- Blanche de la Force in Dialogues des Carmélites
- Marnie in Marnie
- Mélisande in Pelléas et Mélisande
- Songbird in Songbird (adapted from La Périchole)
- Carmen in Carmen
