= Tony Lee Moral =

Tony Lee Moral is a British documentary film maker and writer.

Moral is also the creative director of Sabana Films, a television and film production company based in the UK. He directs factual, specialist factual and entertainment programmes for television, such as; Man vs Wild, Bill Bailey's Birdwatching Bonanza, Last Man Standing, Globetrekker and Wild Thing I Love You.

His three books on Alfred Hitchcock; Alfred Hitchcock's Movie Making Masterclass The Making of Hitchcock's The Birds and Hitchcock and the making of Marnie (ISBN 978-0810856844) which investigates the behind the scenes of one of Alfred Hitchcock's most controversial films. The book also examines the critical reception of Marnie.

Moral criticised the BBC and HBO for their portrayal of Hitchcock in The Girl, a drama they co-produced in 2012. He claimed that the film showed Hitchcock "as a 'lascivious letch'", and "of 'damaging his reputation'."

== Bibliography ==
=== Fiction ===
- Ghost Maven (2016)
- Playing Mrs. Kingston (2014)

=== Non-fiction ===
- The Making of Hitchcock's The Birds (2013)
- Hitchcock and the Making of Marnie, Revised Edition (2013)
- Alfred Hitchcock's Movie Making Masterclass (2013)

== Filmography ==
- Inside Mighty Machines (2018)
- Super Senses (2018)
- Beyond Bionic (2018)
- The Cat that Changed America (2016)
- The Secret Life of Your House (2015)
- Zoo Diaries (2014)
- Supertruckers (2014)
- Vinnie Jones: Russia's Toughest (2013)
- Scottish Passport (2012)
- The Ancient Life 3D (2011)
- Globetrekker (2011)
- Time Team (2011)
- Help! My House is Infested (2011)
- Wild Britain with Ray Mears (2010)
- Bill Bailey's Birdwatching Bonanza (2010)
- Monsters Inside Me (2009)
- Last Man Standing (2009)
- Naked Science (2009)
- Man vs Wild (2008)
- Wild thing I Love You (2006)
- A Place in the Sun (2004)
- The Shape of Life (2002)
- The Animal Zone (1999)
- Postcards from the Country (1994)
- Eyewitness (1993)
