= Nicholas Wright (playwright) =

British dramatist (born 1940)

- Born: 1940 (age 85–86); Cape Town, South Africa
- Education: London Academy of Music and Dramatic Art

Nicholas Verney Wright (born 1940 in Cape Town, South Africa) is a British dramatist.

== Early life and education ==
Nicholas Wright was born in Cape Town, attended Rondebosch Boys' School and from the age of six was a child actor on radio and on the stage. He came to London in 1958 to train as an actor at the London Academy of Music and Dramatic Art (LAMDA) and subsequently worked as a floor-assistant in BBC Television and as a runner in film, notably John Schlesinger's Far From the Madding Crowd.

== Career ==
He started work at the Royal Court Theatre in 1965 as Casting Director and became, first, an assistant director there and then the first Director of the Royal Court's Theatre Upstairs, where for several years he presented an innovatory programme of new writing. From 1975 to 1977 he was joint artistic director of the Royal Court and he was subsequently a member of the Royal Court Theatre's Board.

He is former literary manager and associate director of the Royal National Theatre, and a former member of the National Theatre Board. In 2015 and 2016 he was the judge of the Yale Drama Series competition for playwrights. His publications include 99 Plays, a survey of drama from Aeschylus to the present day, and Changing Stages, co-written with Richard Eyre.

== Theatre work ==
- 1978 Treetops (Riverside Studios) (George Devine Award)
- 1979 The Gorky Brigade (Royal Court Theatre)
- 1980 One Fine Day (Riverside Studios)
- 1983 The Crimes of Vautrin (Joint Stock Theatre Company)
- 1983 The Custom of the Country (Royal Shakespeare Company)
- 1984 The Desert Air (Royal Shakespeare Company)
- 1988 Mrs. Klein (i.e. Melanie Klein) (Royal National Theatre, Lucille Lortel Theatre, NY))
- 1993 More Tales of the City (TV adaptation) (Channel 4)
- 1996 John Gabriel Borkman (adaptation) (Royal National Theatre)
- 1998 Naked (adaptation) (Almeida Theatre and Playhouse Theatre)
- 2000 Cressida (Almeida at the Albery Theatre)
- 2001 Lulu (adaptation) (Almeida Theatre)
- 2003 Vincent in Brixton (Olivier Award, best new play 2003) (Royal National Theatre, Golden Theater NY.)
- 2003 Three Sisters (adaptation) (Royal National Theatre)
- 2003 His Dark Materials, adapted from the trilogy by Philip Pullman (Royal National Theatre)
- 2003 The Little Prince (opera libretto adapted from Saint-Exupéry's novella; music by Rachel Portman) (BBC Television)
- 2006 Man on the Moon (TV opera libretto with music by Jonathan Dove) (Channel 4)
- 2006 Thérèse Raquin (adaptation) (Chichester Festival Theatre and Royal National Theatre)
- 2007 The Reporter (Royal National Theatre)
- 2008 He's Talking (Royal National Theatre)
- 2008 The Big Bonanza, Poison and The Boy with an African Heart for The No.1 Ladies' Detective Agency (TV) (BBC TV, HBO)
- 2011 Rattigan's Nijinsky (Chichester Festival Theatre)
- 2011 The Last of the Duchess adapted from the book by Caroline Blackwood. (Hampstead Theatre)
- 2012 Travelling Light (Royal National Theatre)
- 2013 A Human Being Died That Night, adapted from the book by Pumla Gobodo-Madikizela (Hampstead Theatre; Fugard Theatre, Cape Town; Market Theatre, Johannesburg)
- 2014 Regeneration, adapted from the novel by Pat Barker (Northampton Royal and Derngate Theatre and Touring Consortium Theatre Company)
- 2017 "The Slaves of Solitude", adapted from the novel by Patrick Hamilton. Hampstead Theatre.

His libretto for Marnie, an opera by Nico Muhly, based on the novel by Winston Graham, was produced by the English National Opera, London in 2017 and by the Metropolitan Opera, New York in 2018.

He is currently (2016) writing a stage version of Robert Louis Stevenson's Strange Case of Dr. Jekyll and Mr. Hyde for Gale King Productions and writing an original play about the last 24 hours in the life of Benazir Bhutto.
