= Moonrise Kingdom (score) =

Moonrise Kingdom (Original Score)
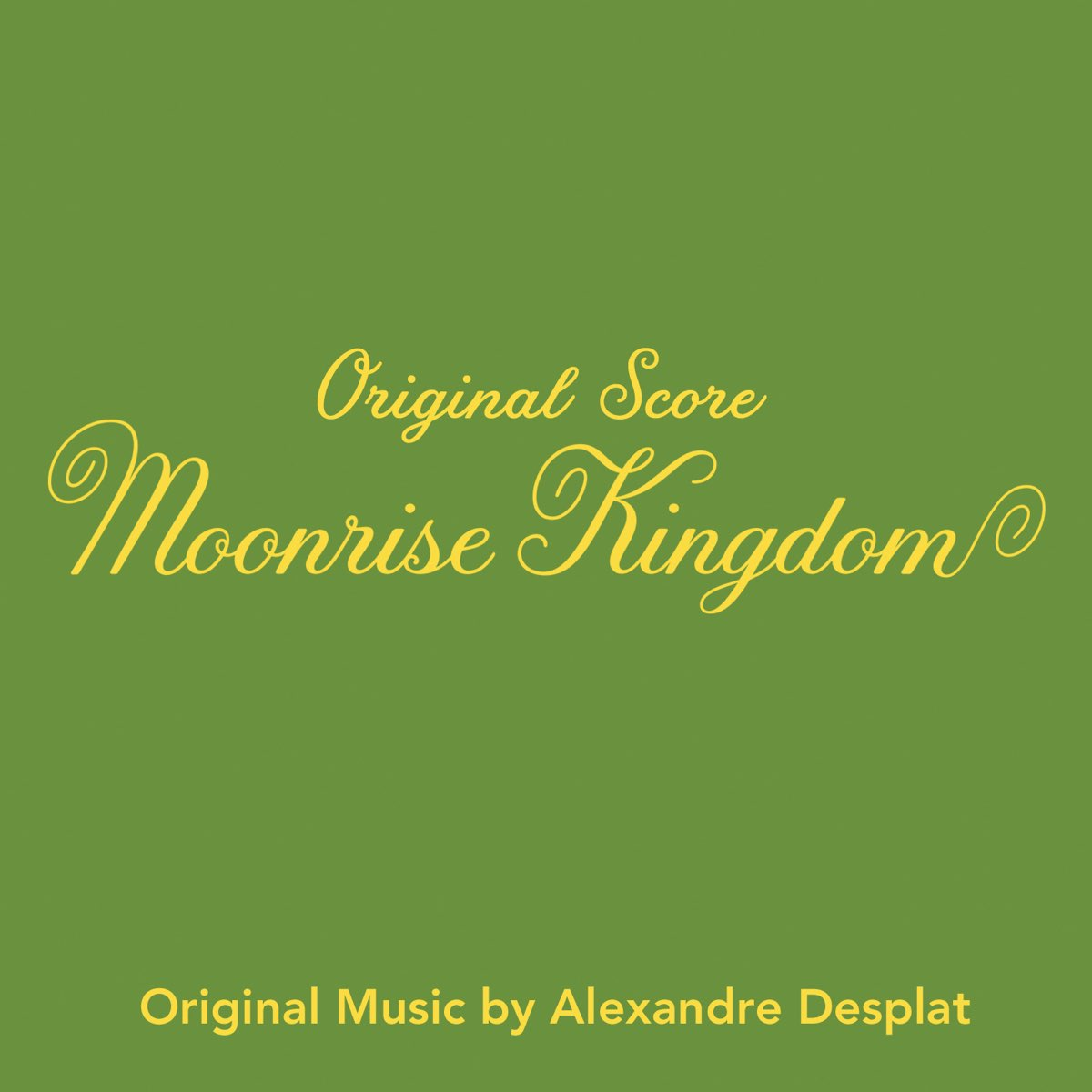

Film score by Alexandre Desplat and Mark Mothersbaugh
- Released: June 19, 2012
- Genres: Film score; classical
- Length: 18:40
- Label: ABKCO
- Producers: Dominique Lemonnier; Alexandre Desplat; Mark Mothersbaugh

Alexandre Desplat film score chronology
A Therapy (2012)	Moonrise Kingdom (2012)	Argo (2012)

Mark Mothersbaugh film score chronology
What to Expect When You're Expecting (2012)	Moonrise Kingdom (2012)	Hotel Transylvania (2012)

Moonrise Kingdom (Original Score) is the accompanying score album for the 2012 coming-of-age comedy-drama film released on June 19, 2012 through ABKCO Records. The score album featured six tracks, including five themes from the soundtrack composed by Alexandre Desplat and one theme by Mark Mothersbaugh, who scored for Anderson's early films. Irrespective of being released along with the soundtrack in May 2012, the score album was separately released, in order to be shortlisted for nominations at award ceremonies, including Academy Awards, which was rejected due to the inspiration of classical music from Benjamin Britten's compositions.

== Development ==
The film marked Alexandre Desplat's second collaboration with Wes Anderson after the stop-motion animated film Fantastic Mr. Fox (2009). Mark Mothersbaugh, who composed for Anderson's early films had worked on one of themes. Mothersbaugh contributed to the percussion instruments for the film score.

Desplat said that "Music is never inherently funny! For me, comic scores always have to have some melancholy in the background. But for Moonrise Kingdom, I was trying more to embrace the world of fantasy of those two adolescents, and capture their sense of adventure and purity." He wrote a seven-minute suite entitled "The Heroic Weather Conditions of the Universe"; describing the title Anderson had said that "it is possible we went too far with the title—we thought it might make it sound more epic". He recalled in a 2015 interview to Vulture, on the motivation of the music, as while building the instrumentation of the suite, orchestra and choir, the score "gave the sensation where we were following the path of the two children. We follow them but they have their own space [...] They connect with their childhood to the music, but they're now heading towards their freedom. There was this sensation of freedom that was the goal, giving an excitation. Like when you're 11 or 12 and you go to camp with friends in the summer, there's the expectation that there will be adventure and fun and that you'll meet new friends and maybe make a new love. That was exactly what we were trying to achieve with the music, and I think we achieved it quite well."

Desplat recorded the film score by January 2012. Since most of the film score has been recorded, the orchestra was disassembled, as he did not supervise the orchestra. Anderson had said "We can't oversee a whole orchestra. If Alexandre [Desplat] was there he would lead an orchestra all at once, but for us we could just do it one part at a time in order to try to get it right". The seven-minute score was split into five pieces, to "fit different moods of the picture" and was surprised at the film's premiere in Cannes, on how the score was edited and assembled with Britten's music, and felt moved with the use of the "Cuckoo Chorus" in climax.

== Track listing ==
All tracks are written by Alexandre Desplat, except where noted.

No.	Title	Length
1.	"The Heroic Weather-Conditions of the Universe, Part 1: A Veiled Mist"	03:16
2.	"The Heroic Weather-Conditions of the Universe, Part 2: Smoke/Fire"	02:53
3.	"The Heroic Weather-Conditions of the Universe, Part 3: The Salt Air"	01:38
4.	"Camp Ivanhoe Cadence Medley" (written by Mark Mothersbaugh; performed by Peter Jarvis and His Drum Corps)	01:36
5.	"The Heroic Weather-Conditions of the Universe, Part 4-6: Thunder, Lightning and Rain"	05:00
6.	"The Heroic Weather-Conditions of the Universe, Part 7: After The Storm"	03:55
Total length:		18:40

== Reception ==
Faded Glamour wrote "Desplat's compositions are magical, whimsical pieces that are exciting and joyous and dramatic, sometimes all at once. They complete Anderson's world beautifully." Jonathan Broxton wrote "the music for Moonrise Kingdom is certainly creative in its makeup, and mirrors the off-kilter nature of the film itself, I found myself completely unable to engage with Desplat's music on an emotional level; it's music that's just “there” – pretty, light, lively, but never really going much beyond the bare bones in terms of what it provides the listener. In many ways, it's a perfect reflection of Anderson's directorial and screenwriting sensibility: it stays detached from the audience, instead being content to present a few light-hearted vignettes that either connect with the audience, or don't. There's no middle ground." Mint's Sanjukta Sharma called the music as "scintillating", while The Hollywood Reporter's Todd McCarthy and Collider's Adam Chitwood called the score and "excellent" and "wonderfully bright". Calling it as one of the "best film scores of 2012", IndieWire stated "Desplat's score fits perfectly, despite featuring in brief". IndieWire, and Collider also called it as one of the "decade's best film score".

== Accolades ==
Moonrise Kingdom was not eligible to be nominated for Best Original Score at the 85th Academy Awards, due to the Desplat's use of Benjamin Britten's music in the score.

Award	Date of ceremony	Category	Recipient(s)	Result	Ref(s)
Broadcast Film Critics Association	January 10, 2013	Best Composer	Alexandre Desplat	Nominated	
Chicago Film Critics Association	December 17, 2012	Best Original Score	Alexandre Desplat	Nominated	
IndieWire Critics Poll	December 18, 2012	Best Original Score/Soundtrack	Alexandre Desplat	4th place	
International Cinephile Society	February 11, 2013	Best Original Score	Alexandre Desplat	Nominated	
International Film Music Critics Association	February 21, 2013	Best Original Score for a Comedy Film	Alexandre Desplat	Nominated	
San Diego Film Critics Society	December 11, 2012	Best Score	Alexandre Desplat	Nominated	
Washington DC Area Film Critics Association	December 10, 2012	Best Score	Alexandre Desplat	Nominated	
World Soundtrack Awards	October 20, 2012	Soundtrack Composer of the Year	Alexandre Desplat	Nominated	

== See also ==
- Moonrise Kingdom (soundtrack)
