= List of accolades received by The Master (2012 film) =

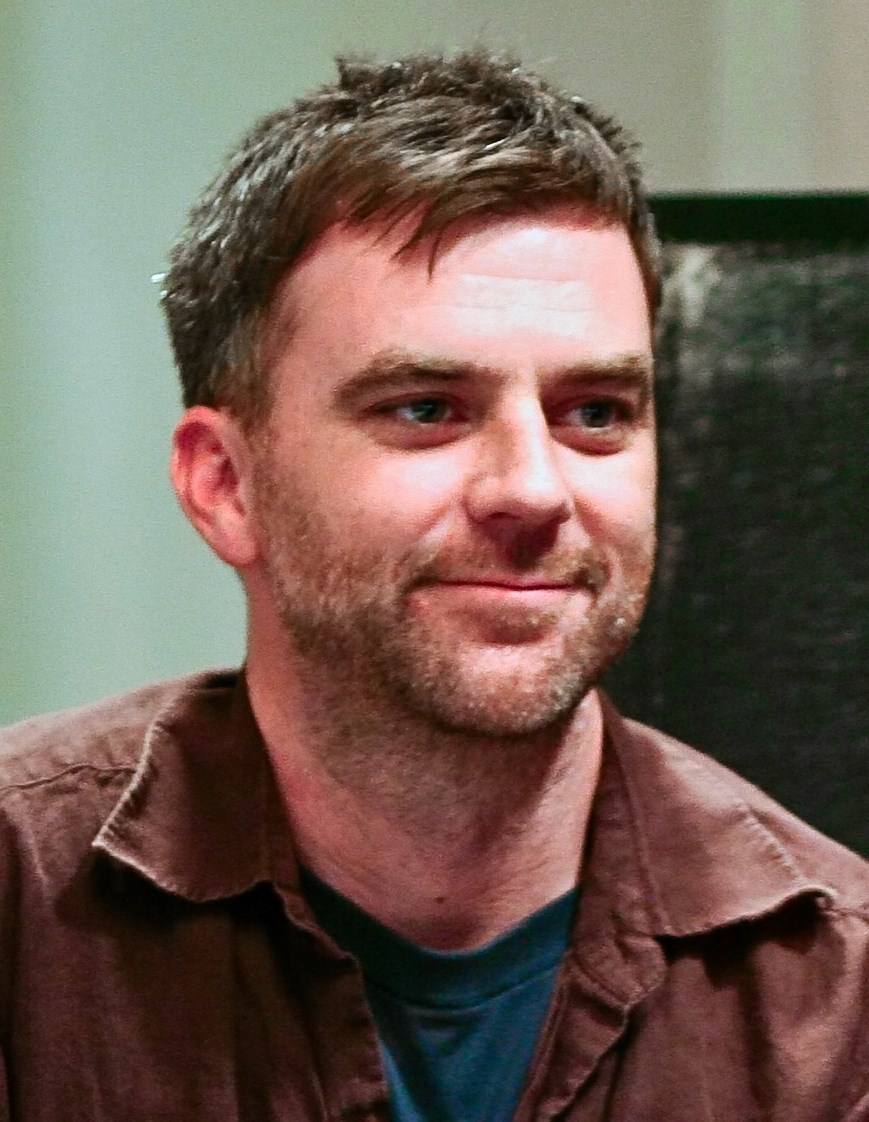
- Director, writer and producer Paul Thomas Anderson received multiple awards and nominations for his work on the film.
Accolades
Award	Wins	Nominations
AACTA International Awards	0	2
Academy Awards	0	3
Alliance of Women Film Journalists	1	4
Austin Film Critics Association	3	4
Boston Society of Film Critics	2	2
British Academy Film Awards	0	4
Chicago Film Critics Association	4	10
Chlotrudis Society for Independent Films	2	3
Critics' Choice Movie Awards	1	7
Dallas–Fort Worth Film Critics Association	2	4
Detroit Film Critics Society	0	3
Dorian Awards	0	1
Dublin Film Critics' Circle	1	3
Florida Film Critics Circle	1	1
Georgia Film Critics Association	1	5
Golden Globe Awards	0	3
Gotham Awards	0	1
Hollywood Film Awards	1	1
Houston Film Critics Society	0	6
International Cinephile Society	4	10
Irish Film & Television Awards	0	1
London Film Critics' Circle	2	7
Los Angeles Film Critics Association	7	7
National Society of Film Critics	6	7
New York Film Critics Online	1	1
Online Film Critics Society	1	8
San Diego Film Critics Society	2	9
San Francisco Film Critics Circle	2	2
Satellite Awards	0	7
Screen Actors Guild Awards	0	1
Society of Camera Operators	0	1
St. Louis Film Critics Association	1	4
Toronto Film Critics Association	6	6
Turkish Film Critics Association	0	1
Vancouver Film Critics Circle	3	4
Venice International Film Festival	3	3
Washington D.C. Area Film Critics Association	2	7
World Soundtrack Awards	0	1
Writers Guild of America Awards	0	1

Totals (Note: Certain award groups do not simply award one winner. They acknowledge several different recipients, have runners-up, and have third place. Since this is a specific recognition and is different from losing an award, runner-up mentions are considered wins in this award tally. For simplification and to avoid errors, each award in this list has been presumed to have had a prior nomination.)
- Wins: 59
- Nominations: 155

The Master is a 2012 American psychological drama film written and directed by Paul Thomas Anderson and starring Joaquin Phoenix, Philip Seymour Hoffman, and Amy Adams.

The film premiered at the Venice Film Festival on September 1, 2012, where it won the FIPRESCI Award for Best Film. In addition, Anderson won the Silver Lion for Best Director and both Phoenix and Hoffman won the Volpi Cup for Best Actor at the festival. The Master was released in theaters in the United States on September 14, 2012, to critical acclaim; its performances (particularly those from the three leads), screenplay, direction, plausibility, and realistic portrayal of post-World War II Americans were praised.

Considered one of Anderson's finest works and one of the best films of the 2010s, it received several award nominations. For their performances, the three leads Phoenix, Hoffman and Adams all received awards from multiple critics groups as well as nominations at the Academy Awards, British Academy Film Awards, and Golden Globe Awards. Hoffman was additionally nominated at the Screen Actors Guild Awards. For his direction and writing, Anderson also won multiple critics awards and received nominations for best original screenplay at the British Academy Film Awards and Writers Guild of America Awards.

== Accolades ==
Award / Association / Film festival	Date of ceremony	Category	Recipient(s)	Result	Ref(s)
AACTA International Awards	January 26, 2013	Best Actor – International	Joaquin Phoenix	Nominated	
AACTA International Awards	January 26, 2013	Best Screenplay – International	Paul Thomas Anderson	Nominated	
Academy Awards	February 24, 2013	Best Actor	Joaquin Phoenix	Nominated	
Academy Awards	February 24, 2013	Best Supporting Actor	Philip Seymour Hoffman	Nominated	
Academy Awards	February 24, 2013	Best Supporting Actress	Amy Adams	Nominated	
Alliance of Women Film Journalists	January 7, 2013	Best Actor	Joaquin Phoenix	Nominated	
Alliance of Women Film Journalists	January 7, 2013	Best Supporting Actor	Philip Seymour Hoffman	Won	
Alliance of Women Film Journalists	January 7, 2013	Best Supporting Actress	Amy Adams	Nominated	
Alliance of Women Film Journalists	January 7, 2013	Best Cinematography	Mihai Mălaimare Jr.	Nominated	
Austin Film Critics Association	December 18, 2012	Top Ten Films	The Master	8th place	
Austin Film Critics Association	December 18, 2012	Best Director	Paul Thomas Anderson	Won	
Austin Film Critics Association	December 18, 2012	Best Actor	Joaquin Phoenix	Won	
Austin Film Critics Association	December 18, 2012	Best Cinematography	Mihai Mălaimare Jr.	Won	
Boston Society of Film Critics	December 9, 2012	Best Director	Paul Thomas Anderson	Runner-up	
Boston Society of Film Critics	December 9, 2012	Best Cinematography	Mihai Mălaimare Jr.	Won	
British Academy Film Awards	February 10, 2013	Best Actor in a Leading Role	Joaquin Phoenix	Nominated	
British Academy Film Awards	February 10, 2013	Best Actor in a Supporting Role	Philip Seymour Hoffman	Nominated	
British Academy Film Awards	February 10, 2013	Best Actress in a Supporting Role	Amy Adams	Nominated	
British Academy Film Awards	February 10, 2013	Best Original Screenplay	Paul Thomas Anderson	Nominated	
Chicago Film Critics Association	December 17, 2012	Best Film	The Master	Nominated	
Chicago Film Critics Association	December 17, 2012	Best Director	Paul Thomas Anderson	Nominated	
Chicago Film Critics Association	December 17, 2012	Best Actor	Joaquin Phoenix	Nominated	
Chicago Film Critics Association	December 17, 2012	Best Supporting Actor	Philip Seymour Hoffman	Won	
Chicago Film Critics Association	December 17, 2012	Best Supporting Actress	Amy Adams	Won	
Chicago Film Critics Association	December 17, 2012	Best Original Screenplay	Paul Thomas Anderson	Nominated	
Chicago Film Critics Association	December 17, 2012	Best Cinematography	Mihai Mălaimare Jr.	Won	
Chicago Film Critics Association	December 17, 2012	Best Original Score	Jonny Greenwood	Won	
Chicago Film Critics Association	December 17, 2012	Best Art Direction	The Master	Nominated	
Chicago Film Critics Association	December 17, 2012	Best Editing	Leslie Jones and Peter McNulty	Nominated	
Chlotrudis Society for Independent Films	March 17, 2013	Best Supporting Actor	Philip Seymour Hoffman	Nominated	
Chlotrudis Society for Independent Films	March 17, 2013	Best Supporting Actress	Amy Adams	Won	
Chlotrudis Society for Independent Films	March 17, 2013	Best Cinematography	Mihai Mălaimare Jr.	Won	
Critics' Choice Movie Awards	January 10, 2013	Best Picture	The Master	Nominated	
Critics' Choice Movie Awards	January 10, 2013	Best Actor	Joaquin Phoenix	Nominated	
Critics' Choice Movie Awards	January 10, 2013	Best Supporting Actor	Philip Seymour Hoffman	Won	
Critics' Choice Movie Awards	January 10, 2013	Best Supporting Actress	Amy Adams	Nominated	
Critics' Choice Movie Awards	January 10, 2013	Best Original Screenplay	Paul Thomas Anderson	Nominated	
Critics' Choice Movie Awards	January 10, 2013	Best Cinematography	Mihai Mălaimare Jr.	Nominated	
Critics' Choice Movie Awards	January 10, 2013	Best Score	Jonny Greenwood	Nominated	
Dallas–Fort Worth Film Critics Association	December 18, 2012	Best Film	The Master	9th place	
Dallas–Fort Worth Film Critics Association	December 18, 2012	Best Actor	Joaquin Phoenix	Runner-up	
Dallas–Fort Worth Film Critics Association	December 18, 2012	Best Supporting Actor	Philip Seymour Hoffman	Runner-up	
Dallas–Fort Worth Film Critics Association	December 18, 2012	Best Supporting Actress	Amy Adams	3rd place	
Detroit Film Critics Society	December 14, 2012	Best Actor	Joaquin Phoenix	Nominated	
Detroit Film Critics Society	December 14, 2012	Best Supporting Actor	Philip Seymour Hoffman	Nominated	
Detroit Film Critics Society	December 14, 2012	Best Supporting Actress	Amy Adams	Nominated	
Dorian Awards	February 17, 2013	Film Performance of the Year – Actor	Joaquin Phoenix	Nominated	
Dublin Film Critics' Circle	December 2012	Best Film	The Master	4th place	
Dublin Film Critics' Circle	December 2012	Best Director	Paul Thomas Anderson	4th place	
Dublin Film Critics' Circle	December 2012	Best Actor	Joaquin Phoenix	Won	
Florida Film Critics Circle	December 18, 2012	Best Supporting Actor	Philip Seymour Hoffman	Won	
Georgia Film Critics Association	January 2013	Best Picture	The Master	Nominated	
Georgia Film Critics Association	January 2013	Best Actor	Joaquin Phoenix	Nominated	
Georgia Film Critics Association	January 2013	Best Supporting Actor	Philip Seymour Hoffman	Won	
Georgia Film Critics Association	January 2013	Best Supporting Actress	Amy Adams	Nominated	
Georgia Film Critics Association	January 2013	Best Original Score	Jonny Greenwood	Nominated	
Golden Globe Awards	January 13, 2013	Best Actor – Motion Picture Drama	Joaquin Phoenix	Nominated	
Golden Globe Awards	January 13, 2013	Best Supporting Actor – Motion Picture	Philip Seymour Hoffman	Nominated	
Golden Globe Awards	January 13, 2013	Best Supporting Actress – Motion Picture	Amy Adams	Nominated	
Gotham Awards	November 26, 2012	Best Feature	Paul Thomas Anderson, Megan Ellison, Daniel Lupi, and JoAnne Sellar	Nominated	
Hollywood Film Awards	October 22, 2012	Supporting Actress of the Year	Amy Adams	Won	
Houston Film Critics Society	January 5, 2013	Best Picture	The Master	Nominated	
Houston Film Critics Society	January 5, 2013	Best Actor	Joaquin Phoenix	Nominated	
Houston Film Critics Society	January 5, 2013	Best Supporting Actor	Philip Seymour Hoffman	Nominated	
Houston Film Critics Society	January 5, 2013	Best Supporting Actress	Amy Adams	Nominated	
Houston Film Critics Society	January 5, 2013	Best Cinematography	The Master	Nominated	
Houston Film Critics Society	January 5, 2013	Best Original Score	The Master	Nominated	
International Cinephile Society	February 11, 2013	Best Picture	The Master	5th place	
International Cinephile Society	February 11, 2013	Best Director	Paul Thomas Anderson	Nominated	
International Cinephile Society	February 11, 2013	Best Actor	Joaquin Phoenix	Nominated	
International Cinephile Society	February 11, 2013	Best Supporting Actor	Philip Seymour Hoffman	Won	
International Cinephile Society	February 11, 2013	Best Supporting Actress	Amy Adams	Won	
International Cinephile Society	February 11, 2013	Best Original Screenplay	Paul Thomas Anderson	Nominated	
International Cinephile Society	February 11, 2013	Best Original Score	Jonny Greenwood	Runner-up	
International Cinephile Society	February 11, 2013	Best Cinematography	Mihai Mălaimare Jr.	Runner-up	
International Cinephile Society	February 11, 2013	Best Editing	Leslie Jones and Peter McNulty	Nominated	
International Cinephile Society	February 11, 2013	Best Production Design	David Crank and Jack Fisk	Nominated	
Irish Film & Television Awards	February 9, 2013	Best International Actor	Joaquin Phoenix	Nominated	
London Film Critics' Circle	January 20, 2013	Film of the Year	The Master	Nominated	
London Film Critics' Circle	January 20, 2013	Director of the Year	Paul Thomas Anderson	Nominated	
London Film Critics' Circle	January 20, 2013	Actor of the Year	Joaquin Phoenix	Won	
London Film Critics' Circle	January 20, 2013	Supporting Actor of the Year	Philip Seymour Hoffman	Won	
London Film Critics' Circle	January 20, 2013	Supporting Actress of the Year	Amy Adams	Nominated	
London Film Critics' Circle	January 20, 2013	Screenwriter of the Year	Paul Thomas Anderson	Nominated	
London Film Critics' Circle	January 20, 2013	Technical Achievement	David Crank and Jack Fisk	Nominated	
Los Angeles Film Critics Association	December 9, 2012	Best Film	The Master	Runner-up	
Los Angeles Film Critics Association	December 9, 2012	Best Director	Paul Thomas Anderson	Won	
Los Angeles Film Critics Association	December 9, 2012	Best Actor	Joaquin Phoenix	Won	
Los Angeles Film Critics Association	December 9, 2012	Best Supporting Actress	Amy Adams	Won	
Los Angeles Film Critics Association	December 9, 2012	Best Music	Jonny Greenwood	Runner-up	
Los Angeles Film Critics Association	December 9, 2012	Best Cinematography	Mihai Mălaimare Jr.	Runner-up	
Los Angeles Film Critics Association	December 9, 2012	Best Production Design	David Crank and Jack Fisk	Won	
National Society of Film Critics	January 5, 2013	Best Film	The Master	Runner-up	
National Society of Film Critics	January 5, 2013	Best Director	Paul Thomas Anderson	Runner-up	
National Society of Film Critics	January 5, 2013	Best Actor	Joaquin Phoenix	Runner-up	
National Society of Film Critics	January 5, 2013	Best Supporting Actor	Philip Seymour Hoffman	3rd place	
National Society of Film Critics	January 5, 2013	Best Supporting Actress	Amy Adams	Won	
National Society of Film Critics	January 5, 2013	Best Screenplay	Paul Thomas Anderson	Runner-up	
National Society of Film Critics	January 5, 2013	Best Cinematography	Mihai Mălaimare Jr.	Won	
New York Film Critics Online	December 9, 2012	Top Films of the Year	The Master	Won	
Online Film Critics Society	December 31, 2012	Best Picture	The Master	Nominated	
Online Film Critics Society	December 31, 2012	Best Director	Paul Thomas Anderson	Won	
Online Film Critics Society	December 31, 2012	Best Actor	Joaquin Phoenix	Nominated	
Online Film Critics Society	December 31, 2012	Best Supporting Actor	Philip Seymour Hoffman	Won	
Online Film Critics Society	December 31, 2012	Best Supporting Actress	Amy Adams	Nominated	
Online Film Critics Society	December 31, 2012	Best Original Screenplay	Paul Thomas Anderson	Nominated	
Online Film Critics Society	December 31, 2012	Best Editing	Leslie Jones and Peter McNulty	Nominated	
Online Film Critics Society	December 31, 2012	Best Cinematography	Mihai Mălaimare Jr.	Nominated	
San Diego Film Critics Society	December 11, 2012	Best Film	The Master	Nominated	
San Diego Film Critics Society	December 11, 2012	Best Director	Paul Thomas Anderson	Nominated	
San Diego Film Critics Society	December 11, 2012	Best Actor	Joaquin Phoenix	Nominated	
San Diego Film Critics Society	December 11, 2012	Best Supporting Actor	Philip Seymour Hoffman	Nominated	
San Diego Film Critics Society	December 11, 2012	Best Supporting Actress	Amy Adams	Nominated	
San Diego Film Critics Society	December 11, 2012	Best Original Screenplay	Paul Thomas Anderson	Won	
San Diego Film Critics Society	December 11, 2012	Best Score	Jonny Greenwood	Won	
San Diego Film Critics Society	December 11, 2012	Best Cinematography	Mihai Mălaimare Jr.	Nominated	
San Diego Film Critics Society	December 11, 2012	Best Editing	Leslie Jones and Peter McNulty	Nominated	
San Francisco Film Critics Circle	December 16, 2012	Best Picture	The Master	Won	
San Francisco Film Critics Circle	December 16, 2012	Best Actor	Joaquin Phoenix	Won	
Satellite Awards	December 16, 2012	Best Actor	Joaquin Phoenix	Nominated	
Satellite Awards	December 16, 2012	Best Supporting Actor	Philip Seymour Hoffman	Nominated	
Satellite Awards	December 16, 2012	Best Supporting Actress	Amy Adams	Nominated	
Satellite Awards	December 16, 2012	Best Original Screenplay	Paul Thomas Anderson	Nominated	
Satellite Awards	December 16, 2012	Best Original Score	Jonny Greenwood	Nominated	
Satellite Awards	December 16, 2012	Best Cinematography	Mihai Mălaimare Jr.	Nominated	
Satellite Awards	December 16, 2012	Best Art Direction and Production Design	David Crank and Jack Fisk	Nominated	
Screen Actors Guild Awards	January 27, 2013	Outstanding Performance by a Male Actor in a Supporting Role	Philip Seymour Hoffman	Nominated	
Society of Camera Operators	March 9, 2013	Camera Operator of the Year – Film	Colin Anderson	Nominated	
St. Louis Film Critics Association	December 11, 2012	Best Actor	Joaquin Phoenix	Nominated	
St. Louis Film Critics Association	December 11, 2012	Best Supporting Actress	Amy Adams	Nominated	
St. Louis Film Critics Association	December 11, 2012	Best Cinematography	Mihai Mălaimare Jr.	Nominated	
St. Louis Film Critics Association	December 11, 2012	Best Scene	The Master	Won	
Toronto Film Critics Association	January 8, 2013	Best Film	The Master	Won	
Toronto Film Critics Association	January 8, 2013	Best Director	Paul Thomas Anderson	Won	
Toronto Film Critics Association	January 8, 2013	Best Actor	Joaquin Phoenix	Runner-up	
Toronto Film Critics Association	January 8, 2013	Best Supporting Actor	Philip Seymour Hoffman	Won	
Toronto Film Critics Association	January 8, 2013	Best Supporting Actress	Amy Adams	Runner-up	
Toronto Film Critics Association	January 8, 2013	Best Screenplay	Paul Thomas Anderson	Won	
Turkish Film Critics Association	January 21, 2013	Best Foreign Film	The Master	3rd place	
Vancouver Film Critics Circle	January 7, 2013	Best Film	The Master	Nominated	
Vancouver Film Critics Circle	January 7, 2013	Best Actor	Joaquin Phoenix	Won	
Vancouver Film Critics Circle	January 7, 2013	Best Supporting Actor	Philip Seymour Hoffman	Won	
Vancouver Film Critics Circle	January 7, 2013	Best Supporting Actress	Amy Adams	Won	
Venice International Film Festival	September 8, 2012	FIPRESCI Award	The Master	Won	
Venice International Film Festival	September 8, 2012	Silver Lion for Best Director	Paul Thomas Anderson	Won	
Venice International Film Festival	September 8, 2012	Volpi Cup for Best Actor	Philip Seymour Hoffman and Joaquin Phoenix	Won	
Washington D.C. Area Film Critics Association	December 10, 2012	Best Director	Paul Thomas Anderson	Nominated	
Washington D.C. Area Film Critics Association	December 10, 2012	Best Actor	Joaquin Phoenix	Nominated	
Washington D.C. Area Film Critics Association	December 10, 2012	Best Supporting Actor	Philip Seymour Hoffman	Won	
Washington D.C. Area Film Critics Association	December 10, 2012	Best Supporting Actress	Amy Adams	Nominated	
Washington D.C. Area Film Critics Association	December 10, 2012	Best Original Screenplay	Paul Thomas Anderson	Nominated	
Washington D.C. Area Film Critics Association	December 10, 2012	Best Score	Jonny Greenwood	Won	
Washington D.C. Area Film Critics Association	December 10, 2012	Best Cinematography	Mihai Mălaimare Jr.	Nominated	
World Soundtrack Awards	October 19, 2013	Best Original Score of the Year	Jonny Greenwood	Nominated	
Writers Guild of America Awards	February 17, 2013	Best Original Screenplay	Paul Thomas Anderson	Nominated	
