= List of accolades received by Moonrise Kingdom =

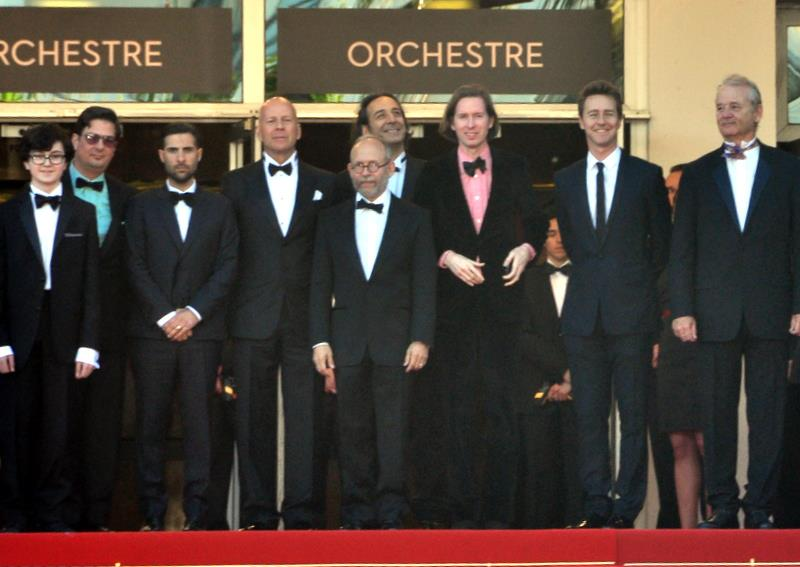
Accolades
Award	Won	Nominated
Academy Awards	0	1
American Cinema Editors	0	1
American Film Institute	1	1
Austin Film Critics Association	0	1
Bodil Awards	0	1
Boston Society of Film Critics	1	1
BAFTA Awards	0	1
Broadcast Film Critics Association	0	5
Cannes Film Festival	1	1
Chicago Film Critics Association	1	4
Costume Designers Guild	0	1
Dallas-Fort Worth Film Critics Association	0	2
Empire Awards	0	1
Golden Globe Awards	0	1
Gotham Awards	1	2
Guldbagge Awards	0	1
Independent Spirit Awards	0	5
Los Angeles Film Critics Association	0	1
MTV Movie Awards	0	1
Online Film Critics Society	1	4
Producers Guild of America	0	1
Writers Guild of America Awards	0	1
San Diego Film Critics Society	0	3
Satellite Awards	0	2
Washington DC Area Film Critics Association	0	6
World Soundtrack Awards	0	1
Young Artist Awards	0	2
- Total number of awards and nominations
Totals	6	52
- References

Moonrise Kingdom is a 2012 American coming-of-age film directed by Wes Anderson, written by Anderson and Roman Coppola, and described as an "eccentric, pubescent love story". It features newcomers Jared Gilman and Kara Hayward in the main roles and an ensemble cast. The film premiered at the 2012 Cannes Film Festival.

Moonrise Kingdom received critical acclaim; review aggregation website Rotten Tomatoes gives the film a rating of 93% based on reviews from 239 critics, with an average score of 8.2/10. The consensus states, "Warm, whimsical, and poignant, the immaculately framed and beautifully acted Moonrise Kingdom presents writer/director Wes Anderson at his idiosyncratic best". Review aggregation website Metacritic gives the film a weighted average score of 84 (out of 100), based on 43 reviews, indicating "universal acclaim". Moonrise Kingdom was also listed on many critics' top 10 lists of the year.

At Cannes, the film was in competition for the Palme d'Or, although the only award it won there was the unofficial "Palme de Whiskers" in recognition of the cat, "Tabitha". The film was nominated for the Academy Award for Best Original Screenplay, and the Golden Globe for Best Musical or Comedy. The film was later included in the BBC's 100 Greatest Films of the 21st Century.

== Accolades ==
Award	Date of ceremony	Category	Recipient(s)	Result	Ref(s)
Academy Awards	February 24, 2013	Best Original Screenplay	Wes Anderson and Roman Coppola	Nominated	
American Cinema Editors	February 16, 2013	Best Edited Feature Film - Comedy or Musical	Andrew Weisblum	Nominated	
American Film Institute	December 2012	Top Ten Films of the Year	Jeremy Dawson, Scott Rudin, Steven Rales, Wes Anderson	Won	
Austin Film Critics Association	December 18, 2012	Best Film	Moonrise Kingdom	Nominated	
Bodil Awards	March 16, 2013	Best American Film	Moonrise Kingdom	Nominated	
Boston Society of Film Critics	December 9, 2012	Best Use of Music in a Film	Moonrise Kingdom	Won	
BAFTA Awards	February 10, 2013	Best Original Screenplay	Wes Anderson, Roman Coppola	Nominated	
Broadcast Film Critics Association	January 10, 2013	Best Film	Moonrise Kingdom	Nominated	
Broadcast Film Critics Association	January 10, 2013	Best Young Performer	Kara Hayward	Nominated	
Broadcast Film Critics Association	January 10, 2013	Best Cast	Moonrise Kingdom cast	Nominated	
Broadcast Film Critics Association	January 10, 2013	Best Original Screenplay	Wes Anderson, Roman Coppola	Nominated	
Broadcast Film Critics Association	January 10, 2013	Best Composer	Alexandre Desplat	Nominated	
Cannes Film Festival	May 16 – 27, 2012	Palme de Whiskers	"Tabitha"	Won	
Chicago Film Critics Association	December 17, 2012	Best Original Screenplay	Wes Anderson and Roman Coppola	Nominated	
Chicago Film Critics Association	December 17, 2012	Best Original Score	Alexandre Desplat	Nominated	
Chicago Film Critics Association	December 17, 2012	Best Art Direction	Moonrise Kingdom	Won	
Chicago Film Critics Association	December 17, 2012	Most Promising Performer	Kara Hayward	Nominated	
Costume Designers Guild	February 19, 2013	Excellence in Period Film	Kasia Walicka-Maimone	Nominated	
Dallas–Fort Worth Film Critics Association	December 18, 2012	Best Picture	Moonrise Kingdom	6th place	
Dallas–Fort Worth Film Critics Association	December 18, 2012	Best Director	Wes Anderson	5th place	
Empire Awards	March 24, 2013	Best Comedy	Moonrise Kingdom	Nominated	
Golden Globe Awards	January 13, 2013	Best Motion Picture – Musical or Comedy	Moonrise Kingdom	Nominated	
Gotham Awards	November 26, 2012	Best Ensemble Performance	Moonrise Kingdom cast	Nominated	
Gotham Awards	November 26, 2012	Best Feature	Moonrise Kingdom	Won	
Guldbagge Awards	January 21, 2013	Best Foreign Film	Moonrise Kingdom	Nominated	
Independent Spirit Awards	February 23, 2013	Best Cinematography	Robert Yeoman	Nominated	
Independent Spirit Awards	February 23, 2013	Best Director	Wes Anderson	Nominated	
Independent Spirit Awards	February 23, 2013	Best Feature	Moonrise Kingdom	Nominated	
Independent Spirit Awards	February 23, 2013	Best Screenplay	Wes Anderson, Roman Coppola	Nominated	
Independent Spirit Awards	February 23, 2013	Best Supporting Male	Bruce Willis	Nominated	
Los Angeles Film Critics Association	December 9, 2012	Best Production Design	Adam Stockhausen	Runner-up	
MTV Movie Awards	April 14, 2013	Best Kiss	Kara Hayward and Jared Gilman	Nominated	
Online Film Critics Society	2013	Best Director	Wes Anderson	Nominated	
Online Film Critics Society	2013	Best Picture	Moonrise Kingdom	Nominated	
Online Film Critics Society	2013	Best Original Screenplay	Wes Anderson, Roman Coppola	Won	
Online Film Critics Society	2013	Best Cinematography	Robert D. Yeoman	Nominated	
Producers Guild of America	January 26, 2013	Best Picture	Scott Rudin, Wes Anderson, Jeremy Dawson and Steven Rales	Nominated	
Writers Guild of America	February 17, 2013	Best Original Screenplay	Wes Anderson and Roman Coppola	Nominated	
San Diego Film Critics Society	December 11, 2012	Best Original Screenplay	Wes Anderson, Roman Coppola	Nominated	
San Diego Film Critics Society	December 11, 2012	Best Production Design	Adam Stockhausen	Nominated	
San Diego Film Critics Society	December 11, 2012	Best Score	Alexandre Desplat	Nominated	
Satellite Awards	December 16, 2012	Best Original Screenplay	Wes Anderson, Roman Coppola	Nominated	
Satellite Awards	December 16, 2012	Best Film	Moonrise Kingdom	Nominated	
Washington DC Area Film Critics Association	December 10, 2012	Best Ensemble	Moonrise Kingdom	Nominated	
Washington DC Area Film Critics Association	December 10, 2012	Best Original Screenplay	Wes Anderson, Roman Coppola	Nominated	
Washington DC Area Film Critics Association	December 10, 2012	Best Art Direction	Moonrise Kingdom	Nominated	
Washington DC Area Film Critics Association	December 10, 2012	Best Score	Alexandre Desplat	Nominated	
Washington DC Area Film Critics Association	December 10, 2012	Best Youth Performance	Jared Gilman	Nominated	
Washington DC Area Film Critics Association	December 10, 2012	Best Youth Performance	Kara Hayward	Nominated	
World Soundtrack Awards	October 20, 2012	Soundtrack Composer of the Year	Alexandre Desplat	Nominated	
Young Artist Awards	May 5, 2013	Best Performance in a Feature Film - Leading Young Actor	Jared Gilman	Nominated	
Young Artist Awards	May 5, 2013	Best Performance in a Feature Film - Leading Young Actress	Kara Hayward	Nominated	
