= Chicago Film Critics Association Awards 2012 =

Annual US film awards ceremony

25th Chicago Film Critics Association
- Date: December 17, 2012
- Site: Chicago, Illinois, U.S.

Highlights
- Best Film: Zero Dark Thirty
- Most awards: Zero Dark Thirty (5)
- Most nominations: The Master (10)

The 25th Chicago Film Critics Association Awards, honoring the best in film for 2012, were announced on December 17, 2012.

== Winners and nominees ==
The winners and nominees for the 25th Chicago Film Critics Association Awards are as follows:

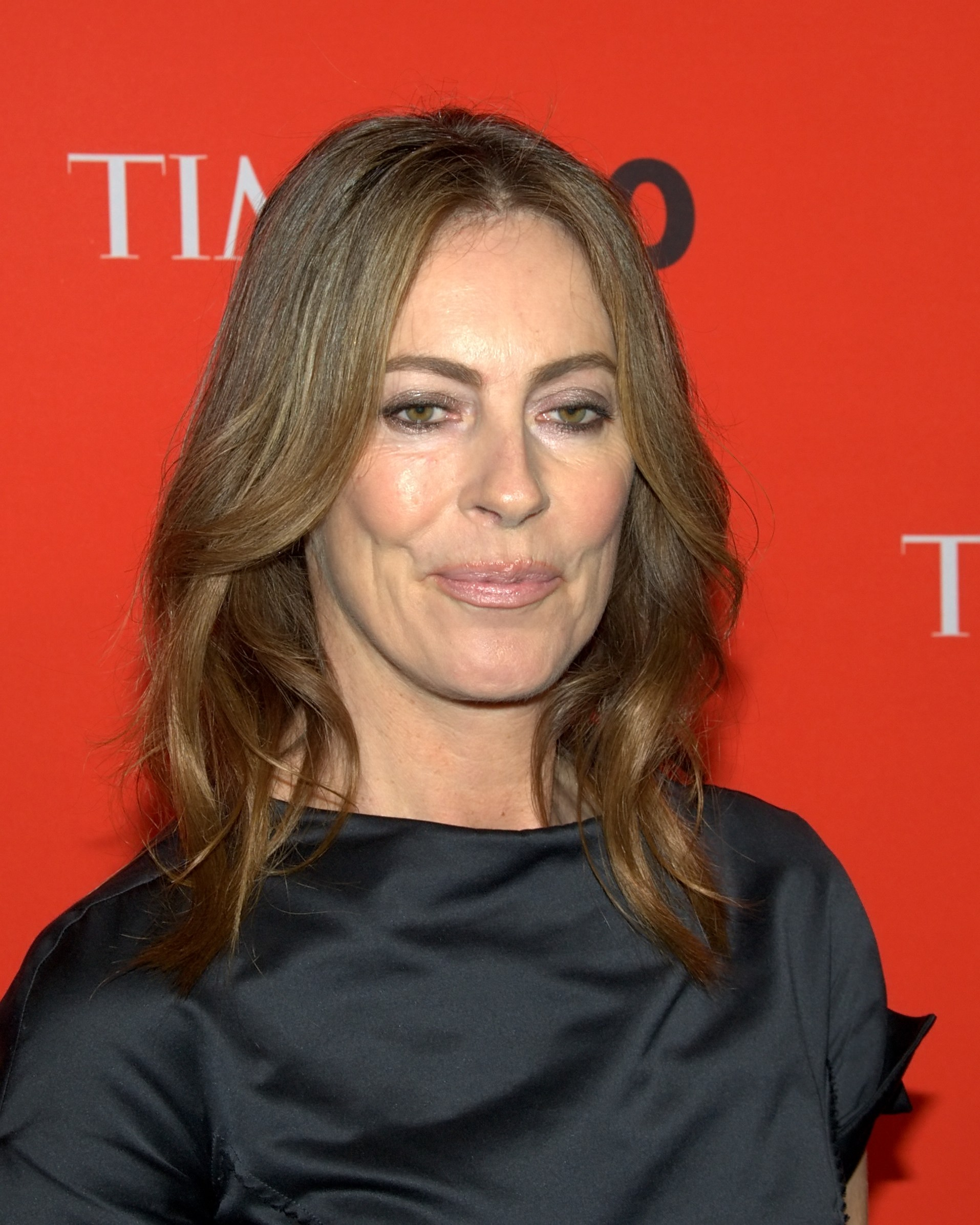
Kathryn Bigelow, Best Director winner

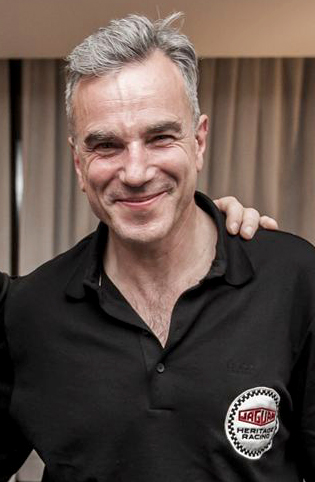
Daniel Day-Lewis, Best Actor winner

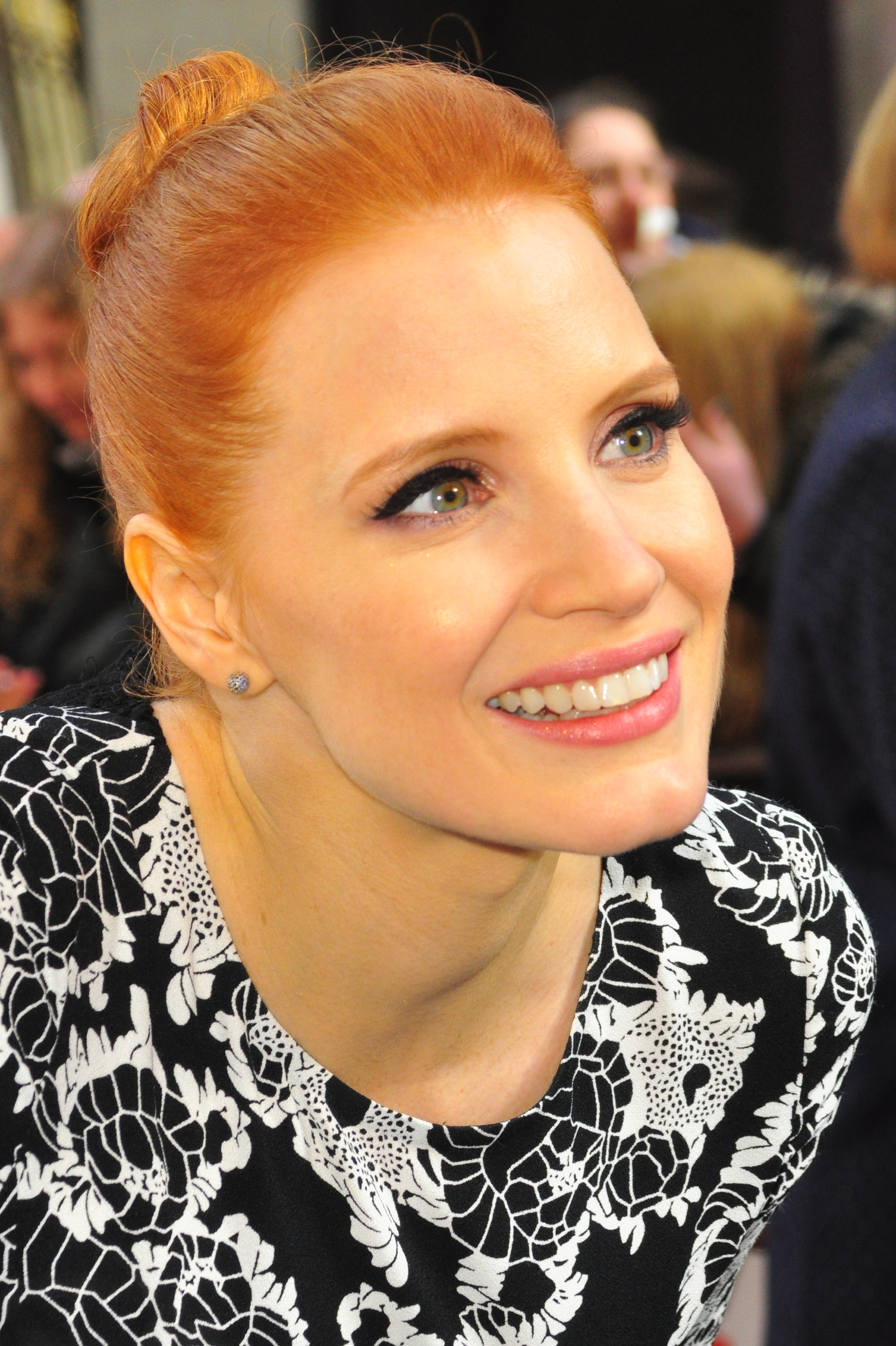
Jessica Chastain, Best Actress winner

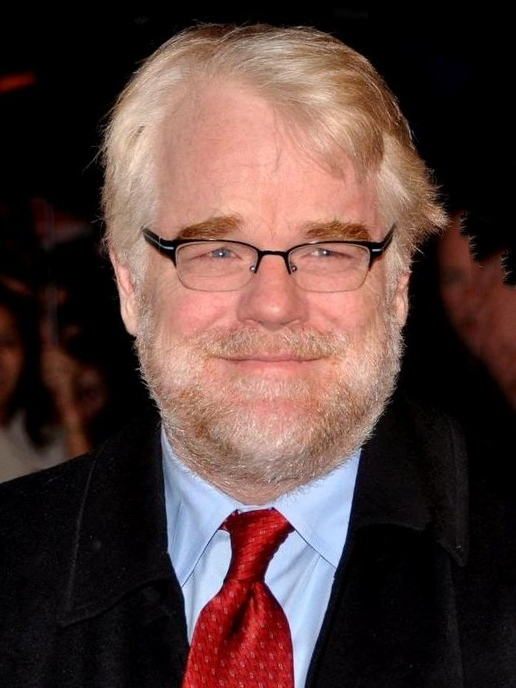
Philip Seymour Hoffman, Best Supporting Actor winner

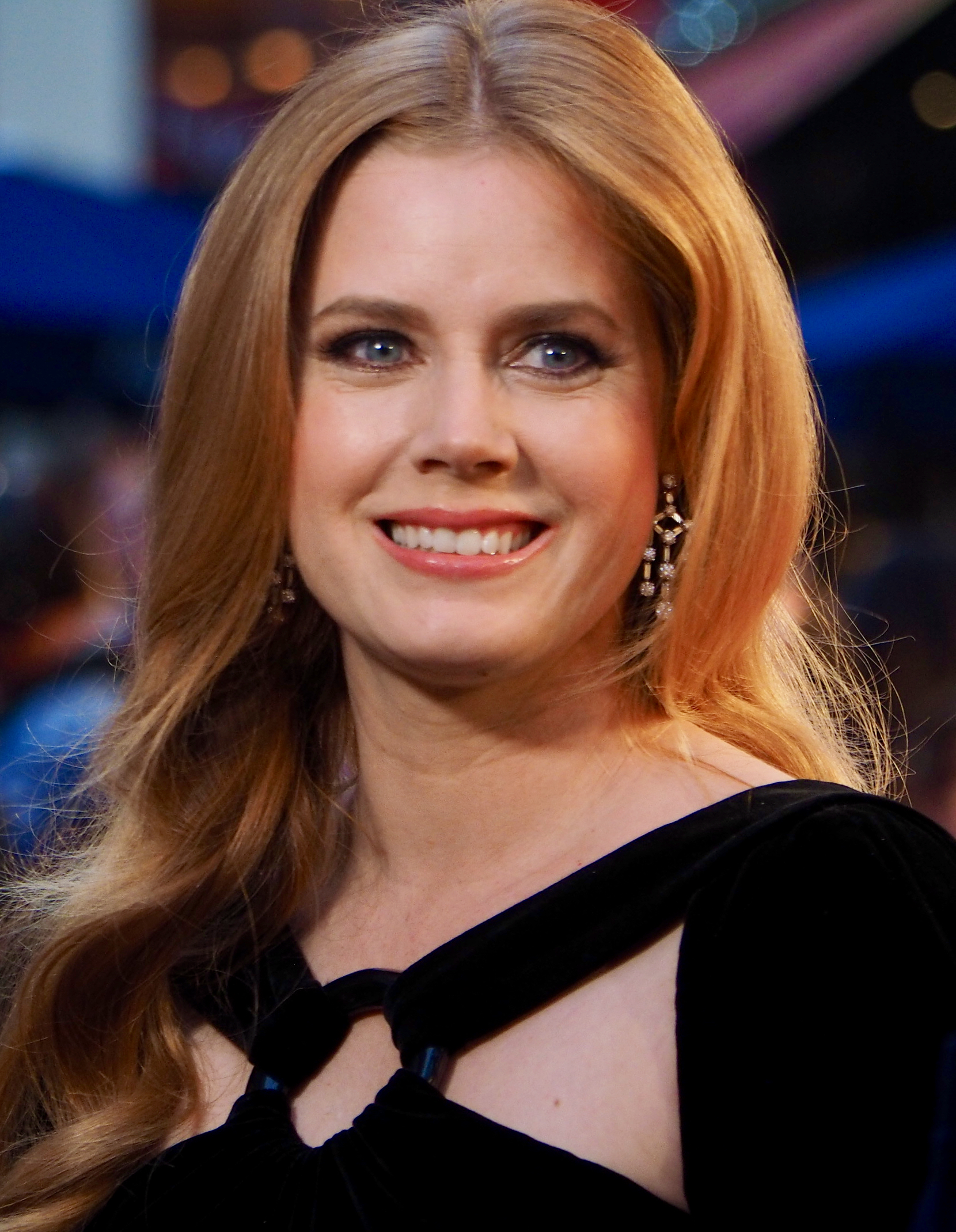
Amy Adams, Best Supporting Actress winner

=== Awards ===
Best Film	Best Director
Zero Dark Thirty – Kathryn Bigelow, Mark Boal, and Megan Ellison: Argo – Ben Affleck, George Clooney, and Grant Heslov; Beasts of the Southern Wild – Dan Janvey, Josh Penn, and Michael Gottwald; Lincoln – Steven Spielberg and Kathleen Kennedy; The Master – JoAnne Sellar, Daniel Lupi, Paul Thomas Anderson, and Megan Ellison	Kathryn Bigelow – Zero Dark Thirty: Ben Affleck – Argo; Paul Thomas Anderson – The Master; Steven Spielberg – Lincoln; Benh Zeitlin – Beasts of the Southern Wild
Best Actor	Best Actress
Daniel Day-Lewis – Lincoln as Abraham Lincoln: John Hawkes – The Sessions as Mark O'Brien; Denis Lavant – Holy Motors as Mr. Oscar / Various Characters; Joaquin Phoenix – The Master as Freddie Quell; Denzel Washington – Flight as William "Whip" Whitaker, Sr.	Jessica Chastain – Zero Dark Thirty as Maya: Helen Hunt – The Sessions as Cheryl Cohen-Greene; Jennifer Lawrence – Silver Linings Playbook as Tiffany Maxwell; Emmanuelle Riva – Amour as Anne Laurent; Quvenzhané Wallis – Beasts of the Southern Wild as Hushpuppy; Naomi Watts – The Impossible as Maria Bennett
Best Supporting Actor	Best Supporting Actress
Philip Seymour Hoffman – The Master as Lancaster Dodd: Jason Clarke – Zero Dark Thirty as Dan; Leonardo DiCaprio – Django Unchained as "Monsieur" Calvin J. Candie; Dwight Henry – Beasts of the Southern Wild as Wink; Tommy Lee Jones – Lincoln as Thaddeus Stevens	Amy Adams – The Master as Peggy Dodd: Emily Blunt – Looper as Sara; Judi Dench – Skyfall as M; Sally Field – Lincoln as Mary Todd Lincoln; Anne Hathaway – Les Misérables as Fantine
Best Original Screenplay	Best Adapted Screenplay
Zero Dark Thirty – Mark Boal: Django Unchained – Quentin Tarantino; Looper – Rian Johnson; The Master – Paul Thomas Anderson; Moonrise Kingdom – Wes Anderson and Roman Coppola	Lincoln – Tony Kushner based in part of the book Team of Rivals: The Political Genius of Abraham Lincoln by Doris Kearns Goodwin: Argo – Chris Terrio based on a selection from The Master of Disguise by Antonio J. Mendez and the Wired magazine article The Great Escape by Joshuah Bearman; Beasts of the Southern Wild – Lucy Alibar and Benh Zeitlin based on the play; The Perks of Being a Wallflower – Stephen Chbosky based on his novel; Silver Linings Playbook – David O. Russell based on the novel by Matthew Quick
Best Animated Film	Best Foreign Language Film
ParaNorman – Sam Fell and Chris Butler: Brave – Mark Andrews and Brenda Chapman; Frankenweenie – Tim Burton; The Secret World of Arrietty – Hiromasa Yonebayashi; Wreck-It Ralph – Rich Moore	Amour (Austria) in French – Directed by Michael Haneke: Holy Motors (France) in French – Directed by Leos Carax; The Intouchables (France) in French – Directed by Éric Toledano and Olivier Nakache; Once Upon a Time in Anatolia (Turkey) in Turkish – Directed by Nuri Bilge Ceylan; Rust and Bone (France) in French – Directed by Jacques Audiard
Best Documentary Film	Best Original Score
The Invisible War – Kirby Dick: The Central Park Five – Ken Burns, Sarah Burns, and David McMahon; The Queen of Versailles – Lauren Greenfield; Searching for Sugar Man – Malik Bendjelloul; West of Memphis – Amy J. Berg	The Master – Jonny Greenwood: Argo – Alexandre Desplat; Beasts of the Southern Wild – Dan Romer and Benh Zeitlin; Moonrise Kingdom – Alexandre Desplat; Zero Dark Thirty – Alexandre Desplat
Best Production Design	Best Editing
Moonrise Kingdom – Production Design: Adam Stockhausen; Set Decoration: Kris Moran: Anna Karenina – Production Design: Sarah Greenwood; Set Decoration: Katie Spencer; Les Misérables – Production Design: Eve Stewart; Set Decoration: Anna Lynch-Robinson; Lincoln – Production Design: Rick Carter; Set Decoration: Jim Erickson; The Master – Production Design: David Crank and Jack Fisk; Set Decoration: Amy Wells	Zero Dark Thirty – William Goldenberg and Dylan Tichenor: Argo – William Goldenberg; Cloud Atlas – Alexander Berner and Claus Wehlisch; The Master – Leslie Jones and Peter McNulty; Skyfall – Stuart Baird
Best Cinematography	
The Master – Mihai Mălaimare Jr.: Life of Pi – Claudio Miranda; Lincoln – Janusz Kamiński; Skyfall – Roger Deakins; Zero Dark Thirty – Greig Fraser
Most Promising Filmmaker	Most Promising Performer
Benh Zeitlin – Beasts of the Southern Wild: Stephen Chbosky – The Perks of Being a Wallflower; Drew Goddard – The Cabin in the Woods; Nicholas Jarecki – Arbitrage; Colin Trevorrow – Safety Not Guaranteed	Quvenzhané Wallis – Beasts of the Southern Wild: Samantha Barks – Les Misérables; Kara Hayward – Moonrise Kingdom; Dwight Henry – Beasts of the Southern Wild; Tom Holland – The Impossible

== Awards breakdown ==
The following films received multiple nominations:

Nominations	Film
10	The Master
8	Beasts of the Southern Wild
8	Lincoln
8	Zero Dark Thirty
5	Argo
4	Moonrise Kingdom
3	Les Miserables
3	Skyfall
2	Amour
2	Django Unchained
2	Holy Motors
2	The Impossible
2	Looper
2	The Perks of Being a Wallflower
2	Silver Linings Playbook

The following films received multiple wins:

Wins	Film
5	Zero Dark Thirty
4	The Master
2	Beasts of the Southern Wild
2	Lincoln
