= The Cabin in the Woods =

2011 film by Drew Goddard

- Theatrical release poster
- Directed by: Drew Goddard
- Written by: Joss Whedon; Drew Goddard
- Produced by: Joss Whedon
- Starring: Kristen Connolly; Chris Hemsworth; Anna Hutchison; Fran Kranz; Jesse Williams; Richard Jenkins; Bradley Whitford
- Cinematography: Peter Deming
- Edited by: Lisa Lassek
- Music by: David Julyan
- Production companies: Metro-Goldwyn-Mayer; Mutant Enemy Productions
- Distributed by: Lionsgate
- Release dates: December 11, 2011 (Butt-Numb-A-Thon); April 13, 2012 (United States)
- Running time: 95 minutes
- Countries: United States; Canada
- Language: English
- Budget: $30 million
- Box office: $69.9 million

The Cabin in the Woods is a 2011 American-Canadian science fiction comedy horror film directed by Drew Goddard in his directorial debut, produced by Joss Whedon, and written by Whedon and Goddard. It stars Kristen Connolly, Chris Hemsworth, Anna Hutchison, Fran Kranz, Jesse Williams, Richard Jenkins, and Bradley Whitford. The plot follows a group of college students who retreat to a remote cabin in the woods where they fall victim to a variety of monsters while technicians manipulate events from an underground facility for a global purpose.

Goddard and Whedon, who previously worked together on Buffy the Vampire Slayer and Angel, wrote the screenplay in three days, describing it as an attempt to "revitalize" the slasher film genre and as a critical satire on torture porn. The special effects, monster costumes, special makeup, and prosthetic makeup for the film were done by AFX Studio. Filming took place in Vancouver, British Columbia, from March to May 2009 on an estimated budget of $30 million.

The film was originally slated for release on October 23, 2009, which was later delayed to February 5, 2010, by Metro-Goldwyn-Mayer (MGM) and United Artists (UA), but was indefinitely shelved due to financial difficulties. In 2011, Lionsgate Films picked up the distribution rights. The film premiered in December 2011 at the Butt-Numb-A-Thon film festival in Austin, Texas and was released in the United States on April 13, 2012, to critical and commercial success. It grossed $66.5 million worldwide, and received generally positive reviews from critics, who praised its screenplay, tone, and performances.

== Plot ==
In an underground laboratory, engineers Gary Sitterson and Steve Hadley discuss preparations for a mysterious ritual. The Stockholm operation recently failed, leaving only their facility and one in Japan to undertake the process, with the latter holding a perfect record. Camera feeds reveal multiple locations around the world in ruins.

American college students Dana Polk, Jules Louden, Curt Vaughan, Holden McCrea, and Marty Mikalski are spending their weekend at Curt's cousin's cabin in the woods. From the lab, Sitterson and Hadley remotely control the cabin and manipulate the students' behavior with mind-altering drugs. They lure the group into the cabin's cellar which contains an assortment of bizarre objects. Dana finds the diary of Patience Buckner, a cabin resident abused by her sadistic family. Dana recites incantations from the diary and inadvertently awakens the whole Buckner family as zombies.

Marty, who is resistant to the facility's drugs due to his marijuana use, grows paranoid, but his concerns are dismissed by the other students. Hadley releases pheromones to induce Curt and Jules to have sex outside. The Buckners attack them, killing Jules while Curt flees. Marty discovers concealed surveillance equipment in his room before being stabbed and dragged off by a zombie. The lab workers learn that the site in Japan has also failed, meaning that the American site is "humanity's last hope".

Curt, Holden, and Dana attempt to escape in their RV, but Sitterson triggers a tunnel collapse to block them. Curt attempts to jump a ravine on his motorcycle to seek help on the other side, but crashes into a force field and falls to his death. Dana then realizes that Marty was right and their experience is staged and controlled. Holden is killed by a zombie while driving the RV, causing it to crash into the lake. Dana manages to escape and swim to the lake's dock, but a zombie corners and brutally attacks her.

The lab employees celebrate the success of the rite, believing that Dana is the last survivor. However, Marty comes to her rescue, having previously survived the ambush. He takes her to a hidden elevator, and they descend into the lab and discover an extensive collection of monsters in cages. Dana correlates them with the objects in the cellar and realizes that the objects determine which monsters are released. Cornered by security personnel, the pair release all the monsters, which wreak havoc and slaughter the staff. Hadley is killed by a merman and Dana accidentally stabs Sitterson.

Dana and Marty discover an ancient temple where the facility's director confronts them. She explains that annual human sacrifice rituals are held worldwide to appease the Ancient Ones, a group of cruel subterranean deities. Each region has its ritual, and the American ritual involves the sacrifice of five archetypes: the whore (Jules), the athlete (Curt), the scholar (Holden), the fool (Marty), and the virgin (Dana). The order is arbitrary as long as the whore dies first and the virgin dies last or survives.

The director urges Dana to kill Marty and complete the ritual, but as Dana considers it, a werewolf suddenly mauls her. Marty shoots the werewolf and scares it off, but the director attacks him. Patience Buckner arrives and kills the director before Marty kicks them into the pit below. Deciding that humanity is not worth saving, Dana and Marty apologize to each other and share a joint as the temple floor collapses. A giant hand bursts out of the ground, destroying the facility and the cabin in the process, bringing about the end of the world.

== Cast ==
- Kristen Connolly as Dana Polk, a college student designated as "The Virgin"
- Chris Hemsworth as Curt Vaughan, a sociology major designated as "The Athlete"
- Anna Hutchison as Jules Louden, a pre-medical college student and Curt's girlfriend, designated as "The Whore"
- Fran Kranz as Marty Mikalski, a stoner college student designated as "The Fool"
- Jesse Williams as Holden McCrea, Curt's football teammate, designated as "The Scholar"
- Richard Jenkins as Gary Sitterson, one of the Facility's technicians
- Bradley Whitford as Steve Hadley, one of the Facility's technicians
- Brian White as Daniel Truman, the Facility's control room security officer
- Amy Acker as Wendy Lin, one of the Facility's technicians
- Sigourney Weaver as The Director, the unnamed leader of the Facility
- Tim de Zarn as Mordecai, a gas station owner who works for the Facility (designated as "The Harbinger")
- Tom Lenk as Ronald the Intern, the Facility's intern
- Dan Payne as Mathew Buckner
- Jodelle Ferland as Patience Buckner
- Dan Shea as Father Buckner

== Production ==
=== Filming ===
Principal photography began on March 9, 2009, in Vancouver, and concluded in May 2009. Joss Whedon co-wrote the script with Cloverfield screenwriter Drew Goddard, who also directed the film, marking his directorial debut. Goddard previously worked with Whedon on Buffy the Vampire Slayer and Angel as a writer.

Whedon described the film as an attempt to revitalize the horror genre. He called it a "loving hate letter" to the genre, continuing:

... it's a serious critique of what we love and what we don't about horror movies. I love being scared. I love that mixture of thrill, of horror, that objectification/identification thing of wanting definitely for the people to be all right but at the same time hoping they'll go somewhere dark and face something awful. The things that I don't like are kids acting like idiots, the devolution of the horror movie into torture porn and into a long series of sadistic comeuppances. Drew and I both felt that the pendulum had swung a little too far in that direction.

Concerning the sheer number of creatures to be designed and made for the film, AFX Studio's David LeRoy Anderson estimated that "close to a thousand" people were turned into one of around 60 different monster types. The task necessitated renting a much larger facility to use as a workspace, as a crew of around 60 people were recruited. The producers told them to commence work on December 15, 2008, ahead of the official January 1, 2009, start date. They only completed the work by the March 9, 2009, production date because, as Anderson stated "We had nearly seventy people at peak, but in effect we had a hundred and forty people, because everybody had at least two jobs...it was crazy, but people had an incredible time...none of us are ever going to forget it, and we're never all going to be in the same room again."

The underground complex, elevators, and the control room were all sets, but for several wide shots, the British Columbia Institute of Technology's Aerospace building was used. Production designer Martin Whist referred to Stanley Kubrick and commented: "It's very high-tech industrial, and it's a brand new building, never been shot in before...I wanted [the elevators] to be without any controls...to almost feel like a glamorized freight elevator...The lobby I wanted to look slightly utilitarian, contemporary and institutional...sharp and almost characterless."

=== Downloadable content ===
A tie-in of the film with the video game Left 4 Dead 2 had been planned, with the game seeing downloadable content based on the movie's settings. However, due to MGM's financial problems, the game content was cancelled, but Valve allowed the studio to use monsters from Left 4 Dead 2 to populate the monster cells at the end of the film.

== Release ==
The Cabin in the Woods was slated for wide release on February 5, 2010 (before that, it was slated for release on October 23, 2009), and then delayed until January 14, 2011, so the film could be converted to 3D. However, on June 17, 2010, MGM announced that the film would be delayed indefinitely due to ongoing financial difficulties at the studio.

On March 16, 2011, the Los Angeles Times reported the following: "New (MGM) chief executives Gary Barber and Roger Birnbaum are seeking to sell both Red Dawn and the horror film The Cabin in the Woods, the last two pictures produced under a previous regime, as they try to reshape the 87-year-old company." A distribution sale to Lionsgate was announced on April 28, 2011, with some industry news outlets reporting plans for a Halloween 2011 release. On July 20, 2011, Lionsgate announced that they had acquired the distribution rights to the film and set a release date of April 13, 2012. Goddard described the deal as "a dream", stating "there's no question that Lionsgate is the right home for Cabin...you look at all the films that inspired Cabin – most of them were released by Lionsgate in the first place!" In an interview with Creative Screenwriting, Goddard focused on the advantages of the delayed release, saying, "Lionsgate came along and they were the best possible home for that movie. Had the bankruptcy not happened, we wouldn't have been in the right fit with the right people. Yes, it took two years longer than we wish it would've taken, but Lionsgate didn't make us change a frame and believed in what we were trying to do. If I had complained too much when MGM went bankrupt, we could have hurt ourselves. We just held firm that we believed in the movie and that we would find the right home and time, and it did. It's hard, but you have to be very patient in Hollywood."

A surprise early screening of the film was held at the Butt-Numb-A-Thon in December 2011, attracting highly positive reactions. The film later screened on March 9, 2012, at the South by Southwest film festival, also in Austin.

=== Home media ===
The Cabin in the Woods was released on DVD and Blu-ray in North America on September 18, 2012. Both the DVD and Blu-ray feature an audio commentary by Goddard and Whedon, several featurettes, a documentary about the making of the film, and a Q&A session at the 2012 WonderCon convention.

== Reception ==
=== Box office ===
The Cabin in the Woods grossed $42.1 million in the United States and Canada, and $24.4 million in other territories, for a worldwide total of $66.5 million, against a production budget of $30 million.

The film opened in North America on April 13, 2012, opening with $5.5 million and went on to gross $14.7 million in its opening weekend at 2,811 theaters, finishing third at the box office. The Cabin in the Woods closed in theaters on July 12, 2012, with $42.0 million. In total earnings, its highest-grossing countries after North America were the United Kingdom ($8.5 million), France ($2.4 million), and Russia ($2.3 million).

=== Critical response ===
The review aggregator website Rotten Tomatoes gave the film a rating of 92%, based on 290 reviews, with an average rating of 7.9/10. The site's critical consensus reads, "The Cabin in the Woods is an astonishing meta-feat, capable of being funny, strange, and scary—frequently all at the same time." On Metacritic, the film achieved an average score of 72 out of 100, based on 40 critics, indicating "generally favorable reviews". Audiences polled by CinemaScore gave the film an average grade of "C" on an A+ to F scale.

Roger Ebert of the Chicago Sun-Times gave the film three out of four stars, saying that "The Cabin in the Woods has been constructed almost as a puzzle for horror fans to solve. Which conventions are being toyed with? Which authors and films are being referred to? Is the film itself an act of criticism?" Peter Travers of Rolling Stone gave the film 3.5 out of 4 stars, calling it "fiendishly funny". Travers praised Kristen Connolly and Fran Kranz for their performances, and wrote, "By turning splatter formula on its empty head, Cabin shows you can unleash a fire-breathing horror film without leaving your brain or your heart on the killing floor."

Cinema Blend's Editor in Chief, Katey Rich, gave the film 4.5 out of 5 stars and wrote:

"Even when the story sticks firmly in standard horror territory, this particular group of attractive kids is especially fun to spend time with... You'll have to see it, and you really have to see it if you love horror, hate horror, or have any interest in seeing how the genre can function as a playground for something completely fresh. Richard Jenkins and Bradley Whitford are involved, though in roles that are more fun to discover as you go along-- they do get a lot of the best jokes, though, and their scenes show a lot of Goddard's skill in handling the rhythm of a scene."

Jenkins and Whitford were also admired by The A.V. Club ("Whitford and Jenkins clearly delight in the verbose script") and by Wired, whose reviewer (granting 9 of 10 stars) called Cabin "a smart sendup of horror movies and mythology...with a peculiar relish that testifies to the moviemakers' love of genre film... a smart, sarcastic and deliriously fun journey into the belly of the horror beast." He cited the "witty banter, creative twists" and "clippy, quippy dialog that lifted Firefly and Buffy the Vampire Slayer to cult status."

Ann Hornaday of The Washington Post, giving the movie 3 of 4 stars, wrote:

"A fiendishly clever brand of meta-level genius propels The Cabin in the Woods, a pulpy, deceivingly insightful send-up of horror movies that elicits just as many knowing chuckles as horrified gasps. [It] comes not only to praise the slasher-, zombie- and gore-fests of yore but to critique them, elaborating on their grammatical elements and archetypal figures even while searching for ways to put them to novel use. The danger in such a loftily ironic approach is that everything in the film appears with ready-made quotation marks around it... But by then, the audience will have picked up on the infectiously goofy vibe of an enterprise that, from its first sprightly moments, clearly has no intention of taking itself too seriously."

Eric Goldman, writing for IGN, called the movie "an incredibly clever and fun take on classic horror movie tropes." SF Gate said, "The cliches come at an onslaught pace" in "a wonderfully conceived story that gives a bigger than life and fascinating explanation for why so many horror movie cliches exist in the first place... By the time the ride is over, director Drew Goddard and co-writers Goddard and Joss Whedon will change course three or four times, nodding and winking but never losing momentum." Of the screenplay by Goddard and Whedon, a CNN reviewer praised "these horror hipsters' acidic, postmodern designs on one of the movie industry's hoariest, least respected staples... the dialogue is always a notch or three smarter and snappier than you'd expect."

Keith Phipps of The A.V. Club addressed "...the difficult challenge of putting across a satirical film with a serious body count. Cabin touches on everything from the Evil Dead and Friday the 13th to the mechanized mutilations of the Saw series while digging deeper into the Lovecraftian roots of horror in an attempt to reveal what makes the genre work... It's an exercise in metafiction that, while providing grisly fun, never distances viewers. And it's entertaining, while asking the same question of viewers and characters alike: Why come to a place you knew all along was going to be so dark and dangerous?"

In a more mixed review, Lisa Schwarzbaum of Entertainment Weekly, calling herself "a wised-up viewer", gave the film a "B−" grade and said, "The movie's biggest surprise may be that the story we think we know from modern scary cinema—that horror is a fun, cosmic game, not much else—here turns out to be pretty much the whole enchilada." She nevertheless praised the talents of Whitford and Jenkins: "These two experienced actors provide the film's adult-level entertainment."

Betsy Sharkey of the Los Angeles Times believed that the film "is an inside joke" and also said, "The laughs [in the film] come easily, the screams not so much." David Rooney of The Hollywood Reporter remarked, "It's just too bad the movie is never much more than a hollow exercise in self-reflexive cleverness that's not nearly as ingenious as it seems to think."

A. O. Scott of The New York Times said, "Novelty and genre traditionalism often fight to a draw. Too much overt cleverness has a way of spoiling dumb, reliable thrills. And despite the evident ingenuity and strenuous labor that went into it, The Cabin in the Woods does not quite work." Scott added:

"Some of the pleasure of the first (and best) part of The Cabin in the Woods comes from trying to see just over the narrative horizon and figure out what these incompatible sets of clichés have to do with each other. Two distinct kinds of movie are being yoked, by violence, together, and the performers inhabit their familiar roles with unusual wit."

=== Accolades ===
Award	Date of ceremony	Category	Nominee(s)	Result
Bram Stoker Award	June 2013	Best Screenplay	Joss Whedon and Drew Goddard	Won
British Fantasy Award	November 3, 2013	Best Screenplay	Joss Whedon; Drew Goddard	Won
Central Ohio Film Critics Association	January 3, 2013	Best Original Screenplay	Drew Goddard; Joss Whedon	Runner-up
Central Ohio Film Critics Association	January 3, 2013	Best Picture		5th place
Chicago Film Critics Association	December 17, 2012	Most Promising Filmmaker	Drew Goddard	Nominated
Detroit Film Critics Society	December 14, 2012	Best Screenplay	Drew Goddard; Joss Whedon	Nominated
Empire Awards	March 24, 2013	Best Horror		Nominated
Fangoria Chainsaw Award	June 13, 2013	Best Screenplay	Drew Goddard; Joss Whedon	Won
Fangoria Chainsaw Award	June 13, 2013	Best Supporting Actor	Fran Kranz	Won
Fangoria Chainsaw Award	June 13, 2013	Best Wide-Release Film		Won
Fangoria Chainsaw Award	June 13, 2013	Best Makeup/Creature FX	David LeRoy Anderson	Won
Golden Trailer Awards	May 31, 2012	Best Horror TV Spot		Won
Golden Trailer Awards	May 31, 2012	Best Standee for Feature Film		Nominated
Hugo Award	September 1, 2013	Best Dramatic Presentation – Long Form	Drew Goddard; Joss Whedon	Nominated
Kansas City Film Critics Circle	December 16, 2012	Best Science Fiction, Fantasy or Horror Film		Won
Motion Picture Sound Editors	February 17, 2013	Best Sound Editing – Music in a Feature Film	Clint Bennett (supervising music editor); Tony Lewis (music editor); Julie Pearce (music editor)	Nominated
Online Film Critics Society	December 24, 2012	Best Original Screenplay	Joss Whedon; Drew Goddard	Nominated
Phoenix Film Critics Society	December 18, 2012	Overlooked Film of the Year		Nominated
San Diego Film Critics Society	December 11, 2012	Best Original Screenplay	Drew Goddard; Joss Whedon	Nominated
Saturn Awards	June 26, 2013	Best Horror or Thriller Film		Won
Saturn Awards	June 26, 2013	Best Writing	Drew Goddard; Joss Whedon	Nominated
Toronto Film Critics Association	December 18, 2012	Best First Feature	Drew Goddard	Nominated

== Lawsuit ==
On April 13, 2015, author Peter Gallagher filed a copyright infringement lawsuit in California federal court against Joss Whedon and Drew Goddard, the creators of the film. Gallagher claimed that due to the similarities between the film and his 2006 novel The Little White Trip: A Night in the Pines, Whedon and Goddard had used his work without permission. The lawsuit demanded $10 million in damages. Whedon and Goddard were named as defendants, along with the production company Mutant Enemy and distributor Lionsgate. The case was dismissed five months later.
