= Holy Motors =

2012 French surrealist fantasy drama film by Leos Carax

- French theatrical release poster
- Directed by: Leos Carax
- Written by: Leos Carax
- Produced by: Martine Marignac; Maurice Tinchant; Albert Prévost
- Starring: Denis Lavant; Édith Scob; Eva Mendes; Kylie Minogue; Elise Lhomeau; Michel Piccoli; Jeanne Disson
- Cinematography: Caroline Champetier; Yves Cape
- Edited by: Nelly Quettier
- Production companies: Pierre Grise Productions; Théo Films; Arte France Cinéma; Pandora Film; WDR/Arte; Soficinéma 8; Wild Bunch
- Distributed by: Les Films du Losange (France); Arsenal Filmverleih (Germany)
- Release dates: 23 May 2012 (Cannes Film Festival); 4 July 2012 (France); 30 August 2012 (Germany)
- Running time: 116 minutes
- Countries: France; Germany
- Languages: French; English
- Budget: $4 million
- Box office: $4.2 million

Holy Motors is a 2012 French surrealist fantasy drama film written and directed by Leos Carax and starring Denis Lavant and Édith Scob. Lavant plays Mr. Oscar, a man who appears to have a job as an actor, as he is seen dressing up in different costumes and performing various roles in several locations around Paris over the course of a day, though no cameras or audiences are ever seen around him. The film competed for the Palme d'Or at the 2012 Cannes Film Festival.

== Plot ==
A man wakes up and finds a secret door in his hotel room. He opens it and wanders into a movie theater full of sleeping patrons. A naked child and several dogs wander the aisles.

Meanwhile, in Paris, a rich man waves goodbye to his family and gets into a white limousine. His driver, Céline, calls him Mr. Oscar and tells him he has nine appointments that day. He reads a file, uncovers a mirror, and begins to brush a grey wig. Over the course of the day, he:

- plays an old woman beggar on the Pont Alexandre III.
- dons a motion capture suit and enters an empty sound stage, where he performs action sequences while being directed by an unseen man. A woman in a motion capture suit enters, and the pair perform movements that are used to create a sex scene between animated snakelike creatures.
- plays the role of Monsieur Merde, (Note: A character first shown in the segment "Merde" in the film Tokyo! (2008)) an eccentric and violent red-haired man who lives in the sewers and kidnaps a beautiful model called Kay M. from a photo shoot in a cemetery.
- plays a father who picks up his daughter from a party in an old red car. They argue when the daughter reveals she spent the party hiding in the bathroom instead of socializing.
- (as an interlude) plays R. L. Burnside's "Let My Baby Ride" on the accordion in a church with an ever-growing group of musicians.
- plays a gangster assigned to murder a man who looks identical to him. After he has stabbed the man in the neck and carved scars into the man's face that match his own, the victim suddenly stabs Oscar in the neck. Oscar manages to limp his way back to the limousine, seemingly severely injured. While Oscar is removing his makeup, a man with a port-wine stain on his face reveals his presence in the limo. The man asks Oscar if he still enjoys his work, since he has looked "tired" recently. Oscar admits it is harder now that he cannot see the cameras, but says he continues for "the beauty of the act".
- yells at Céline to stop, runs from the limo wearing a red balaclava covered with barbed wire, and shoots a banker who looks just like he did in the morning when he left for his first appointment. He is gunned down by the banker's bodyguards and Céline rushes to him. As she leads him away, she apologizes and says there has been a mix-up.
- plays the elderly "Mr. Vogan", who enters a hotel and gets into bed in one of the rooms. Vogan's niece Léa enters, they talk about their lives, and he dies. While Léa cries, Oscar gets out of bed and excuses himself to go to another appointment. He asks Léa her real name, and she says it is Élise and that she also has another appointment.
- (in what does not seem to be one of his appointments) is almost hit by another white limousine, whose female passenger he recognizes. Still in pajamas, Oscar asks if they can talk, and they go to the abandoned La Samaritaine building, where Jean (the woman) says they have 20 minutes to catch up on the past 20 years before her "partner" arrives and she will play the last night of an air hostess named Eva Grace. As they ascend to the roof of the building, she sings a wistful song that indicates she and Oscar "once had a child". Oscar leaves her and, avoiding the male partner on the staircase, returns to his limo. When he sees that Eva and the partner have jumped to their deaths from the top of the building, he lets out an anguished cry and runs past them and directly back into the limo as he does so.
- plays a man whose wife and children are chimpanzees.

Alone, Céline drives to the Holy Motors garage, which is filled with other limousines. She parks, places a teal mask on her face, (Note: Edith Scob, who plays Céline, wore a similar mask in her best-known role in Eyes Without a Face. Source: Barber, Lynden. Holy Motors: Cheat sheet. SBS. 8 Aug 2012.) and leaves. The moment she is gone, the limousines begin to talk to one another, expressing fear that they are outdated and unwanted.

== Cast ==
- Denis Lavant as Mr. Oscar / The Banker / The Beggar / The Motion Capture Actor / Monsieur Merde / The Father / The Accordionist / The Killer / The Killed / The Dying / The Man at Home
- Édith Scob as Céline
- Eva Mendes as Kay M.
- Kylie Minogue as Eva Grace (Jean)
- Élise L'Homeau as Léa (Élise)
- Jeanne Disson as Angèle
- Michel Piccoli as The Man with a Birthmark
- Leos Carax as The Sleeper

== Production ==
=== Development ===
Before the production of Holy Motors, Carax had tried to fund a big English-language film for five years. Financiers were reluctant to invest, so Carax, whose previous feature film was Pola X in 1999, decided to make a smaller French-language film first, with the aim of regaining prominence in international cinema. Taking inspiration from the omnibus Tokyo!, for which he had made a commissioned short film (Merde, which featured the original appearance of the character Monsieur Merde), he wrote a cheap film intended for his regular collaborator Denis Lavant. Carax was able to sway potential investors concerned with the film's budget by switching to digital photography, a process of which he strongly disapproves.

The spark for the film came from Carax's observation that stretch limousines were being increasingly used for weddings. He was interested in their bulkiness, saying: "They're outdated, like the old futurist toys of the past. I think they mark the end of an era, the era of large, visible machines." From that grew an idea for a film about the increasing digitalisation of society, a science-fiction scenario where organisms and visible machines share a common superfluity. The opening scene was inspired by the E. T. A. Hoffmann novella Don Juan, about a man who discovers a secret door in his bedroom that leads to an opera house.

Holy Motors was produced through Pierre Grise Productions for a budget of €3.9 million, which included money from the CNC, Île-de-France region, Arte France Cinéma, Canal+, and Ciné+. It was a 20% German co-production through the company Pandora, and received €350,000 from the Franco-German co-production support committee.

=== Casting ===
Of the lead role, Carax said: "If Denis had said no, I would have offered the part to Lon Chaney or to Chaplin. Or to Peter Lorre or Michel Simon, all of whom are dead."

Édith Scob had previously worked with Carax on Les Amants du Pont-Neuf, but was then almost entirely cut out, so Carax felt he owed her a larger role. He also thought Holy Motors was indebted to Georges Franju's Eyes Without a Face, in which Scob starred, and decided to give an explicit nod to the film by casting her.

The character Kay M. came from a canceled project that was supposed to star Lavant and Kate Moss and follow the Merde character from Tokyo! in the United States. Eva Mendes was offered the role after she and Carax met at a film festival and agreed to make a film together.

Carax discovered Kylie Minogue after Claire Denis suggested her for a canceled project.

Michel Piccoli's role was originally intended for Carax himself, but he decided it would be misleading to cast a filmmaker. When Piccoli was cast, the idea was to make him unrecognizable and credit him under a pseudonym, but news of his casting reached the media, so that plan was dropped.

=== Filming and post-production ===
Principal photography took place in Paris. Filming started in September 2011 and ended in November.

The music in the film includes Minogue performing the song "Who Were We?" by Carax and Neil Hannon, as well as Dmitri Shostakovich's String Quartet No. 15 and the track "Sinking of Bingou-Maru" from Godzilla. There are also songs by Sparks, Manset, KONGOS, and R. L. Burnside.

== Release ==
The film premiered on 23 May 2012 in competition at the 65th Cannes Film Festival, after which Variety reported that the screening was met with "whooping and hollering" and "a storm of critical excitement on Twitter". It was released in France on 4 July 2012 through Les Films du Losange.

Holy Motors is dedicated to the Russian actress Yekaterina Golubeva, a longtime girlfriend and muse of Leos Carax. She died in 2011 of an undisclosed cause after suffering from depression for several years.

== Reception ==
=== Critical reception ===
On review aggregator website Rotten Tomatoes, the film has an approval rating of 92% based on 196 reviews, with an average rating of 8.2/10; the website's critical consensus reads: "Mesmerizingly strange and willfully perverse, Holy Motors offers an unforgettable visual feast alongside a spellbinding—albeit unapologetically challenging—narrative." On Metacritic, the film has a weighted average score of 84/100 based on 34 reviews, indicating "universal acclaim".

Peter Bradshaw of The Guardian rated the film five out of five and wrote: "Holy Motors is weird and wonderful, rich and strange—barking mad, in fact. It is wayward, kaleidoscopic, black comic and bizarre; there is in it a batsqueak of genius, dishevelment and derangement; it is captivating and compelling. ... [T]his is what we have all come to Cannes for: for something different, experimental, a tilting at windmills, a great big pole-vault over the barrier of normality by someone who feels that the possibilities of cinema have not been exhausted by conventional realist drama." He later named it one of the year's 10 best films. Robbie Collin of The Daily Telegraph gave the film five stars, writing: "It is a film about the stuff of cinema itself, and is perhaps the strongest contender for the Palme d'Or yet." On his "Views From The Edge" blog, Spencer Hawken wrote: "Holy Motors is a mind-boggling movie, with oodles of character; it's funny, emotional, and surprising. It has images that will stay in your head, most notably the accordion interlude, which comes completely out of nowhere, and really takes things up a gear." William Goss of Film.com wrote: "In terms of pure cinematic sensation, Holy Motors stands as one of the most delightfully enigmatic movies that I've seen in quite some time." Manohla Dargis of The New York Times called Holy Motors one of 2012's 10 best films.

The film placed fourth on Sight and Sound's critics' poll of the best films of 2012, third on The Village Voice's annual poll of film critics, and first on both Film Comment's and Indiewire's year-end film critics' polls. Cahiers du cinéma also named Holy Motors the best film of the year. In 2016, it was chosen as the 16th-greatest film of the 21st century by a worldwide group of critics polled by the BBC. Swedish filmmaker Ruben Östlund named it one of his top ten films in the 2022 Sight and Sound poll. In 2025, it ranked 293rd in the "Readers' Choice" edition of The New York Times's list of "The 100 Best Movies of the 21st Century".

=== Best lists ===
Holy Motors was on numerous critics' and publications' lists of the best films of 2012.

- 1st – Les Inrockuptibles
- 1st – Matt Singer, IndieWire
- 1st – David Ehrlich, IndieWire
- 1st – Richard Brody, The New Yorker
- 1st – Eric Kohn, IndieWire
- 1st – Film Comment
- 1st – Cahiers du Cinéma
- 2nd – Miriam Bale, Fandor
- 2nd – Jonathan Marlow, Fandor
- 2nd – Kevin B. Lee, Fandor
- 2nd – Andrew O'Hehir, Salon
- 2nd – Karina Longworth, The Village Voice
- 2nd – Slant
- 3rd – Nick Schager, Slant
- 3rd – Bilge Ebiri, They live by night
- 3rd – Cinema Scope
- 4th – Manohla Dargis, The New York Times
- 4th – Little White Lies
- 4th – The A.V. Club
- 4th – Scott Tobias, The A.V. Club
- 5th – Ty Burr, The Boston Globe
- 5th – Peter Bradshaw, The Guardian
- 5th – Noel Murray, The A.V. Club
- 6th – Allison Willmore, The A.V. Club
- 7th – Sean Burns, Philadelphia Weekly
- 7th – Ben Sachs, The Chicago Reader
- 8th – Wesley Morris, The Boston Globe
- Top 8 (unranked) – Anthony Lane, The New Yorker
- 9th – The L Magazine
- 9th – Glenn Kenny, Some Came Running
- 10th – Fernando F. Croce, Slant
- 10th – Matt Prigge, Philadelphia Weekly
- 10th – Keith Phipps, The A.V. Club
- Top 10 (unranked) – David Edelstein, New York
- 12th – Sam Adams, The A.V. Club
- 13th – Empire
- Top 15 (unranked) – Dana Stevens, Slate
- Top 16 (unranked) – Dennis Cooper
- 20th – The Huffington Post
- Top 20 (unranked) – Michael Phillips, The Chicago Tribune
- Top 25 (narrative films, unranked);– Dennis Harvey, The San Francisco Bay Guardian

It was also featured on many critics' and publications' lists of the best films of the 2010s:

- 2nd – Cahiers du Cinéma
- 3rd – Rolling Stone
- 4th – Film Comment
- 5th – Jonathan Rosenbaum as submitted to Caimán Cuadernos de Cine
- 6th – IndieWire
- 9th – Glenn Kenny, Some Came Running
- 10th – Cinema Scope
- 11th – Matt Singer, ScreenCrush
- 13th – Hyperallergic
- 14th – The A.V. Club
- 16th – Ty Burr, The Boston Globe
- Top 27 (unranked);– Richard Brody, The New Yorker
- 43rd – Time Out (New York)
- 59th – Paste
- Top 70 (between 26-70, unranked) – RogerEbert.com
- 90th – Film School Rejects

== Accolades ==
Award	Date of ceremony	Category	Nominee(s)	Result
Austin Film Critics Association	18 December 2012	Best Foreign Language Film	Leos Carax	Won
Austin Film Critics Association	18 December 2012	Best Film		Nominated
Bodil Awards	16 March 2013	Best Non-American Film	Leos Carax	Nominated
Boston Society of Film Critics	9 December 2012	Best Actor	Denis Lavant	2nd place
Boston Society of Film Critics	9 December 2012	Best Foreign Language Film		2nd place
Cannes Film Festival	16–27 May 2012	Prize of the Youth	Leos Carax	Won
Cannes Film Festival	16–27 May 2012	Palme d'Or	Leos Carax	Nominated
Chicago Film Critics Association	17 December 2012	Best Actor	Denis Lavant	Nominated
Chicago Film Critics Association	17 December 2012	Best Foreign Language Film		Nominated
Chicago International Film Festival	19 October 2012	Gold Hugo for Best International Feature	Leos Carax	Won
Chicago International Film Festival	19 October 2012	Silver Hugo for Best Actor	Denis Lavant	Won
Chicago International Film Festival	19 October 2012	Silver Hugo for Best Cinematography	Yves Cape, Caroline Champetier	Won
César Awards	22 February 2013	Best Actor	Denis Lavant	Nominated
César Awards	22 February 2013	Best Cinematography	Caroline Champetier	Nominated
César Awards	22 February 2013	Best Director	Leos Carax	Nominated
César Awards	22 February 2013	Best Editing	Nelly Quettier	Nominated
César Awards	22 February 2013	Best Film	Maurice Tinchant (producer); Martine Marignac (producer); Leos Carax (director)	Nominated
César Awards	22 February 2013	Best Original Screenplay	Leos Carax	Nominated
César Awards	22 February 2013	Best Production Design	Florian Sanson	Nominated
César Awards	22 February 2013	Best Sound	Erwan Kerzanet; Josefina Rodríguez; Emmanuel Croset	Nominated
César Awards	22 February 2013	Best Supporting Actress	Édith Scob	Nominated
Dallas-Fort Worth Film Critics Association	18 December 2012	Best Foreign Language Film		Nominated
Fotogramas de Plata		Best Foreign Film	Leos Carax	Won
Gopos Awards	25 March 2013	Best European Film	Leos Carax	Won
London Film Critics' Circle	20 January 2013	Foreign Language Film of the Year		Nominated
London Film Critics' Circle	20 January 2013	Technical Achievement	Bernard Floch (makeup)	Nominated
Los Angeles Film Critics Association	9 December 2012	Best Foreign Language Film	Leos Carax	Won
Los Angeles Film Critics Association	9 December 2012	Best Actor	Denis Lavant	2nd place
National Society of Film Critics	5 January 2013	Best Actor	Denis Lavant	2nd place
New York Film Critics Circle	3 December 2012	Best Foreign Language Film		2nd place
Online Film Critics Society	24 December 2012	Best Film Not in the English Language		Won
Online Film Critics Society	24 December 2012	Best Actor	Denis Lavant	Nominated
Online Film Critics Society	24 December 2012	Best Director	Leos Carax	Nominated
Online Film Critics Society	24 December 2012	Best Picture		Nominated
Robert Awards		Best Non-American Film	Leos Carax	Nominated
San Diego Film Critics Society	11 December 2012	Best Foreign Language Film		Nominated
Sitges Film Festival	4–14 October 2012	Best Director	Leos Carax	Won
Sitges Film Festival	4–14 October 2012	Best Film	Leos Carax	Won
Sitges Film Festival	4–14 October 2012	Premi José Luis Guarner	Leos Carax	Won
Toronto Film Critics Association	26 February 2013	Best Actor	Denis Lavant	Won
Toronto Film Critics Association	26 February 2013	Best Director	Leos Carax	Nominated
Toronto Film Critics Association	26 February 2013	Best Foreign Language Film		Nominated
Vancouver Film Critics Circle	7 January 2013	Best Foreign Language Film		Won

== See also ==
- List of films featuring fictional films
