= London Film Critics Circle Awards 2012 =

British film awards ceremony

33rd London Film Critics Circle Awards

20 January 2013

Film of the Year:
Amour

British Film of the Year:
Berberian Sound Studio

The 33rd London Film Critics' Circle Awards, honouring the best in film for 2012, were announced by the London Film Critics' Circle on 20 January 2013.

== Winners and nominees ==
=== Film of the Year ===
Amour

- Argo
- Beasts of the Southern Wild
- Life of Pi
- The Master

=== British Film of the Year ===
Berberian Sound Studio

- The Imposter
- Les Misérables
- Sightseers
- Skyfall

=== Foreign Language Film of the Year ===
Rust and Bone • France/China

- Amour • Austria/France/Germany
- Holy Motors • France/Germany
- Once Upon a Time in Anatolia • Turkey/Bosnia and Herzegovina
- Tabu • Portugal

=== Documentary of the Year ===
The Imposter

- London: The Modern Babylon
- Nostalgia for the Light
- The Queen of Versailles
- Searching for Sugar Man

=== Director of the Year ===
Ang Lee - Life of Pi

- Paul Thomas Anderson - The Master
- Kathryn Bigelow - Zero Dark Thirty
- Nuri Bilge Ceylan - Once Upon a Time in Anatolia
- Michael Haneke - Amour

=== Screenwriter of the Year ===
Michael Haneke - Amour

- Chris Terrio - Argo
- Quentin Tarantino - Django Unchained
- Paul Thomas Anderson - The Master
- Mark Boal - Zero Dark Thirty

=== Breakthrough British Filmmaker ===
Alice Lowe and Steve Oram - Sightseers

- Ben Drew - Ill Manors
- Sally El Hosaini - My Brother the Devil
- Dexter Fletcher - Wild Bill
- Bart Layton - The Imposter

=== Actor of the Year ===
Joaquin Phoenix - The Master

- Daniel Day-Lewis - Lincoln
- Hugh Jackman - Les Misérables
- Mads Mikkelsen - The Hunt
- Jean-Louis Trintignant - Amour

.......................................................................

=== Actress of the Year ===
Emmanuelle Riva - Amour

- Jessica Chastain - Zero Dark Thirty
- Marion Cotillard - Rust and Bone
- Helen Hunt - The Sessions
- Jennifer Lawrence - Silver Linings Playbook

=== Supporting Actor of the Year ===
Philip Seymour Hoffman - The Master

- Alan Arkin - Argo
- Javier Bardem - Skyfall
- Michael Fassbender - Prometheus
- Tommy Lee Jones - Lincoln

=== Supporting Actress of the Year ===
Anne Hathaway - Les Misérables

- Amy Adams - The Master
- Judi Dench - Skyfall
- Sally Field - Lincoln
- Isabelle Huppert - Amour

=== British Actor of the Year ===
Toby Jones - Berberian Sound Studio

- Daniel Craig - Skyfall
- Charlie Creed-Miles - Wild Bill
- Daniel Day-Lewis - Lincoln
- Steve Oram - Sightseers

=== British Actress of the Year ===
Andrea Riseborough - Shadow Dancer

- Emily Blunt - Looper and Your Sister's Sister
- Judi Dench - The Best Exotic Marigold Hotel and Skyfall
- Alice Lowe - Sightseers
- Helen Mirren - Hitchcock

=== Young British Performer of the Year ===
Tom Holland - The Impossible

- Samantha Barks - Les Misérables
- Jack Reynor - What Richard Did

=== Technical Achievement ===
Life of Pi - Bill Westenhofer, visual effects

- Anna Karenina - Jacqueline Durran, costumes
- Argo - William Goldenberg, film editing
- Beasts of the Southern Wild - Ben Richardson, cinematography
- Berberian Sound Studio - Joakim Sundström and Stevie Haywood, sound design
- Holy Motors - Bernard Floch, make-up
- Life of Pi - Claudio Miranda, cinematography
- The Master - Jack Fisk and David Crank, production design
- My Brother the Devil - David Raedeker, cinematography
- Rust and Bone - Alexandre Desplat, music

=== Dilys Powell Award ===
- Helena Bonham Carter
