= Peter McNulty (film editor) =

American film editor

- Occupation: Film editor

Peter McNulty is a film editor. McNulty was co-nominated (with Leslie Jones) for the Chicago Film Critics Association Awards 2012, the San Diego Film Critics Society Awards 2012 and the Online Film Critics Society Awards 2012 for Best Editing for his work on The Master.

== Filmography ==
Year(s)	Title	Notes
2009	The Last House on the Left	
2010	My Soul to Take	
2011	Scream 4	
2012	The Master	Nominated–Chicago Film Critics Association Award for Best Editing; Nominated–Online Film Critics Society Award for Best Editing; Nominated–San Diego Film Critics Society Award for Best Editing
2013	42	
2014	RoboCop	
2015	Legend	
2017	Megan Leavey	
2018	Hotel Mumbai	Pending — AACTA Award for Best Editing
2020	Bad Boys for Life	
2020	Words on Bathroom Walls	
2022	Call Jane	

2023

“Americana”
