= Boston Society of Film Critics Awards 2012 =

Filmmaking event

33rd BSFC Awards

December 9, 2012

Best Film:
Zero Dark Thirty

The 33rd Boston Society of Film Critics Awards, honoring the best in filmmaking in 2012, were given on December 9, 2012.

== Winners ==
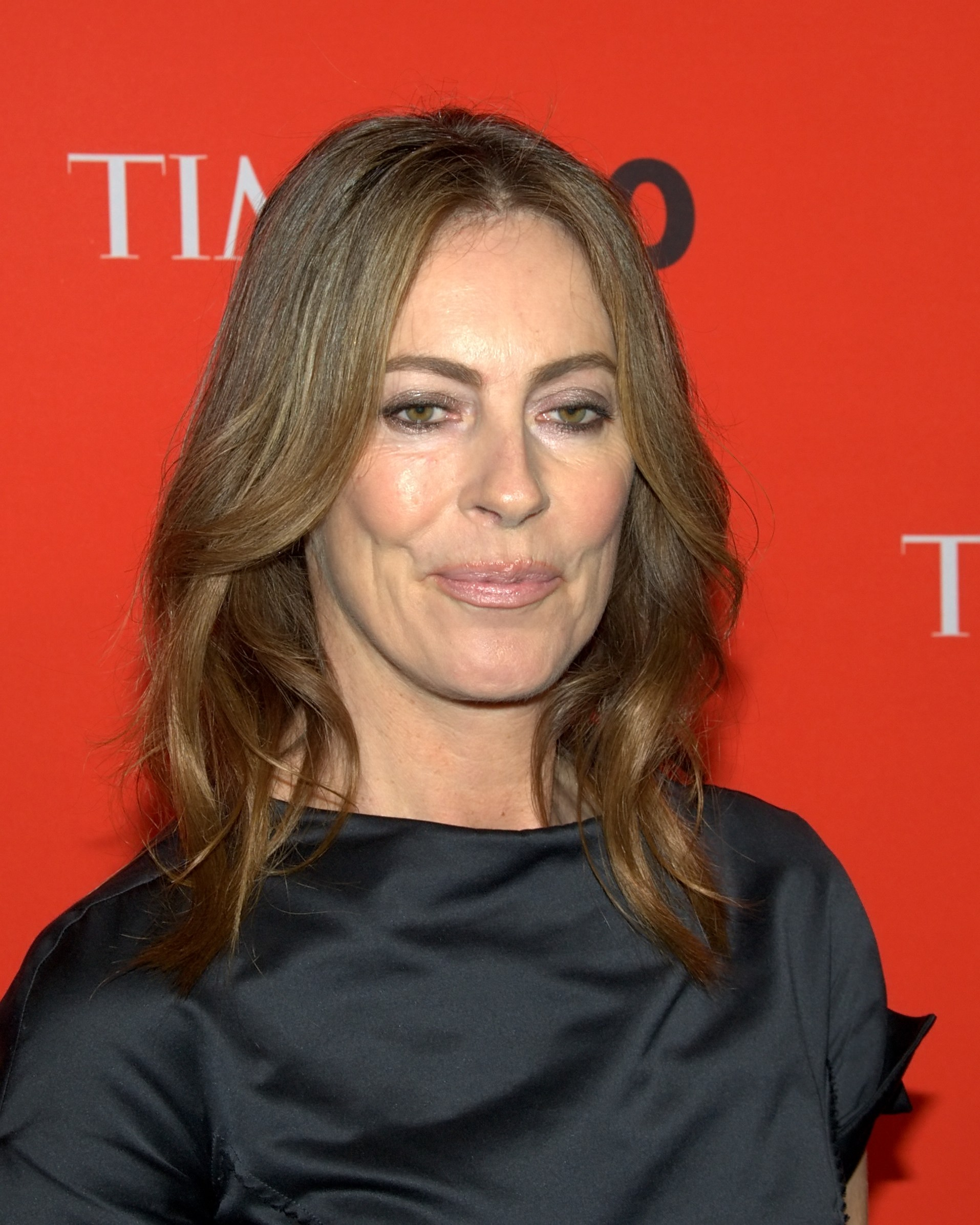
Kathryn Bigelow, Best Director winner

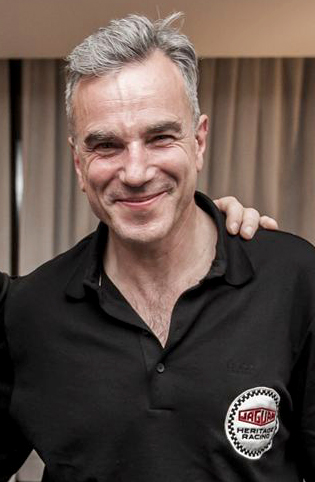
Daniel Day-Lewis, Best Actor winner

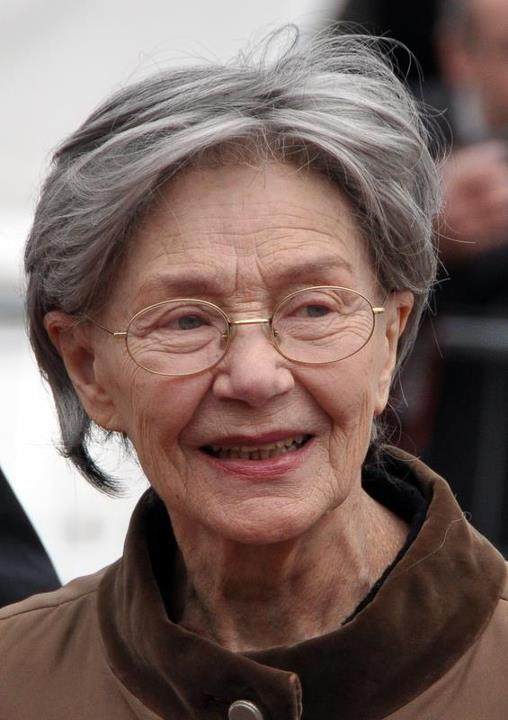
Emmanuelle Riva, Best Actress winner

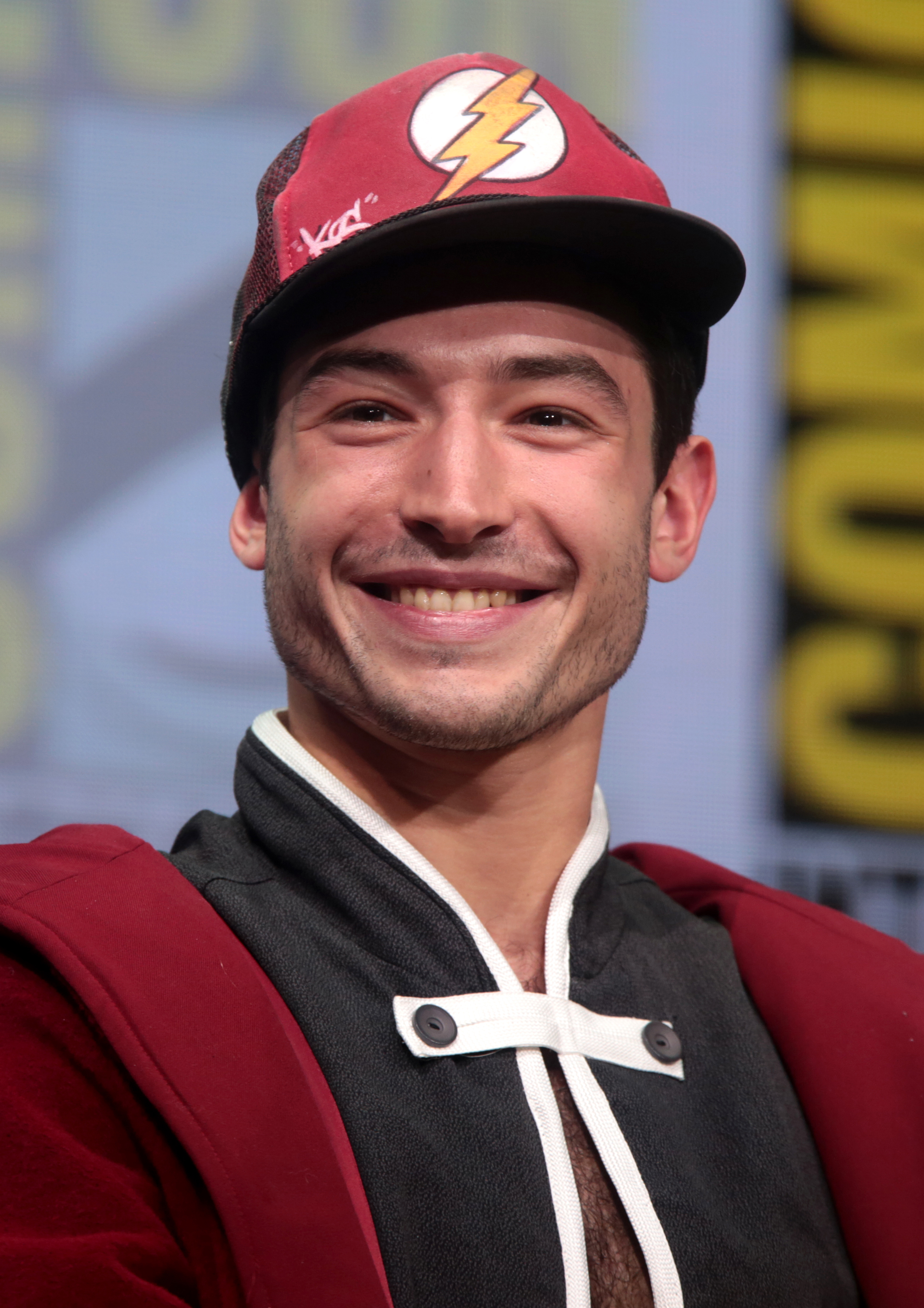
Ezra Miller, Best Supporting Actor winner

Sally Field, Best Supporting Actress winner

- Best Film:
  - Zero Dark Thirty
  - Runner-up: Amour and Moonrise Kingdom
- Best Actor:
  - Daniel Day-Lewis – Lincoln
  - Runner-up: Denis Lavant – Holy Motors
- Best Actress:
  - Emmanuelle Riva – Amour
  - Runner-up: Deanie Ip – A Simple Life (Tao jie)
- Best Supporting Actor:
  - Ezra Miller – The Perks of Being a Wallflower
  - Runner-up: Christoph Waltz – Django Unchained
- Best Supporting Actress:
  - Sally Field – Lincoln
  - Runner-up: Emma Watson – The Perks of Being a Wallflower
- Best Director:
  - Kathryn Bigelow – Zero Dark Thirty
  - Runner-up: Paul Thomas Anderson – The Master
- Best Screenplay:
  - Tony Kushner – Lincoln
  - Runner-up: Wes Anderson and Roman Coppola – Moonrise Kingdom
- Best Cinematography:
  - Mihai Mălaimare Jr. – The Master
  - Runner-up: Robert Yeoman – Moonrise Kingdom and Claudio Miranda – Life of Pi
- Best Documentary:
  - How to Survive a Plague
  - Runner-up: The Queen of Versailles
- Best Foreign-Language Film:
  - Amour • Austria/France/Germany
  - Runner-up: Holy Motors • France/Germany
- Best Animated Film:
  - Frankenweenie
  - Runner-up: ParaNorman
- Best Editing:
  - William Goldenberg and Dylan Tichenor – Zero Dark Thirty
  - Runner-up: William Goldenberg – Argo
- Best New Filmmaker:
  - David France – How to Survive a Plague
  - Runner-up: Benh Zeitlin – Beasts of the Southern Wild
- Best Ensemble Cast:
  - Seven Psychopaths
  - Runner-up: Moonrise Kingdom
- Best Use of Music in a Film:
  - Moonrise Kingdom
  - Runner-up: Django Unchained
