= Toronto Film Critics Association Awards 2012 =

Annual Canadian film awards ceremony

16th Toronto Film Critics Association Awards
- Date: December 18, 2012, Gala February 26, 2013
- Site: Round Room at The Carlu

The 16th Toronto Film Critics Association Awards, honoring the best in film for 2012, were given on December 18, 2012.

Through a naming rights sponsorship with Rogers the Best Canadian Film Award prize money was raised to C$100,000 from $15,000 in 2010 and $10,000 prior to that, while the two runners-up took $5,000 each. It is now the largest film prize in Canada.

== Winners ==
- Best Actor:
  - Denis Lavant – Holy Motors

Runners-Up: Daniel Day-Lewis – Lincoln and Joaquin Phoenix – The Master

- Best Actress:
  - Rachel Weisz – The Deep Blue Sea

Runners-Up: Jessica Chastain – Zero Dark Thirty and Emmanuelle Riva – Amour

- Best Animated Film:
  - ParaNorman

Runners-Up: Brave and Frankenweenie

- Best Director:
  - Paul Thomas Anderson – The Master

Runners-Up: Kathryn Bigelow – Zero Dark Thirty and Leos Carax – Holy Motors

- Best Documentary Film:
  - Stories We Tell

Runners-Up: The Queen of Versailles and Searching for Sugar Man

- Best Film:
  - The Master

Runners-Up: Amour and Zero Dark Thirty

- Best First Feature (tie):
  - Beasts of the Southern Wild
  - Beyond the Black Rainbow

Runner-Up: The Cabin in the Woods

- Best Foreign Language Film:
  - Amour • Austria/France/Germany

Runners-Up: Holy Motors • France/Germany and Tabu • Portugal

- Best Screenplay:
  - The Master – Paul Thomas Anderson

Runners-Up: Lincoln – Tony Kushner and Zero Dark Thirty – Mark Boal

- Best Supporting Actor:
  - Philip Seymour Hoffman – The Master

Runners-Up: Javier Bardem – Skyfall and Tommy Lee Jones – Lincoln

- Best Supporting Actress:
  - Gina Gershon – Killer Joe

Runners-Up: Amy Adams – The Master, Ann Dowd – Compliance and Anne Hathaway – Les Misérables

- Rogers Canadian Film Award:
  - Sarah Polley - Stories We Tell.

Runners-Up: Denis Côté - Bestiaire, Michael Dowse -Goon
