= William Goldenberg =

American film editor (born 1959)

- Born: November 2, 1959 (age 66); United States
- Occupation: Film editor

William Goldenberg (born November 2, 1959) is an American film editor and director. He has more than twenty film and television credits since 1992. He won the Academy Award for Best Film Editing for the film Argo (2012), and has been nominated for The Insider (1999), Seabiscuit (2003), Zero Dark Thirty (2012) and The Imitation Game (2014). He has also received nominations for nine other editing-related awards.

Goldenberg has had extended, notable collaborations with directors Michael Mann and Ben Affleck.

Goldenberg has been elected to membership in the American Cinema Editors. He made his directorial debut with Unstoppable (2024).

== Filmography ==
Editor

Year	Title	Director	Notes
1993	Alive	Frank Marshall	
1994	The Puppet Masters	Stuart Orme	
1995	Heat	Michael Mann	
1995	Body Language	Tom Berenger	TV movie
1995	Citizen X	Chris Gerolmo	
1996	The Long Kiss Goodnight	Renny Harlin	
1998	Pleasantville	Gary Ross	
1999	The Insider	Michael Mann	
2000	Coyote Ugly	David McNally	
2001	Ali	Michael Mann	
2003	Kangaroo Jack	David McNally	
2003	Seabiscuit	Gary Ross	
2004	National Treasure	Jon Turteltaub	
2005	Domino	Tony Scott	
2006	Miami Vice	Michael Mann	
2007	National Treasure: Book of Secrets	Jon Turteltaub	
2007	Gone Baby Gone	Ben Affleck	
2009	Confessions of a Shopaholic	P.J. Hogan	
2010	The Sorcerer's Apprentice	Jon Turteltaub	
2011	Transformers: Dark of the Moon	Michael Bay	
2012	Argo	Ben Affleck	
2012	Zero Dark Thirty	Kathryn Bigelow	
2014	Transformers: Age of Extinction	Michael Bay	
2014	The Imitation Game	Morten Tyldum	
2014	Unbroken	Angelina Jolie	
2015	Concussion	Peter Landesman	
2016	Live by Night	Ben Affleck	
2017	Detroit	Kathryn Bigelow	
2018	22 July	Paul Greengrass	
2019	6 Underground	Michael Bay	
2020	News of the World	Paul Greengrass	
2022	The Outfit	Graham Moore	
2023	Air	Ben Affleck	
2023	Transformers: Rise of the Beasts	Steven Caple Jr.	
2025	The Lost Bus	Paul Greengrass	Also co-producer
2026	The Uprising	Paul Greengrass	Post-production

Director

Year	Title	Notes
2024	Unstoppable	Directorial debut

Other credits

Year	Title	Notes
2024	The Greatest Love Story Never Told	Special thanks

== Awards and nominations ==
Year	Title	Award/Nomination
1995	Citizen X	Nominated—Emmy Award for Outstanding Editing for a Miniseries or a Special - Single Camera Production
1998	Pleasantville	Nominated—Satellite Award for Best Editing
1999	The Insider	Nominated—Academy Award for Best Film Editing; Nominated—ACE Eddie for Best Edited Feature Film – Dramatic; Nominated—Satellite Award for Best Editing
2003	Seabiscuit	Nominated—Academy Award for Best Film Editing; Nominated—ACE Eddie for Best Edited Feature Film – Dramatic; Nominated—Satellite Award for Best Editing
2006	Miami Vice	Nominated—Satellite Award for Best Editing
2012	Argo	Academy Award for Best Film Editing; ACE Eddie for Best Edited Feature Film – Dramatic; BAFTA Award for Best Editing; San Diego Film Critics Society Award for Best Editing; San Francisco Film Critics Circle Award for Best Film Editing; Nominated—Boston Society of Film Critics Awards for Best Editing; Nominated—Broadcast Film Critics Association Award for Best Editing; Nominated—Chicago Film Critics Association Awards for Best Editing; Nominated—Los Angeles Film Critics Association Award for Best Editing
2012	Zero Dark Thirty	Boston Society of Film Critics Awards for Best Editing; Broadcast Film Critics Association Award for Best Editing; Chicago Film Critics Association Awards for Best Editing; Los Angeles Film Critics Association Award for Best Editing; Nominated—Academy Award for Best Film Editing; Nominated—BAFTA Award for Best Editing; Nominated—Critics' Choice Award for Best Editing; Nominated—Satellite Award for Best Editing
2014	The Imitation Game	Nominated—Academy Award for Best Film Editing; Nominated—ACE Eddie for Best Edited Feature Film – Dramatic; Nominated—BAFTA Award for Best Editing; Nominated—Satellite Award for Best Editing
2014	Unbroken	Nominated—Saturn Award for Best Editing

== See also ==
- List of film director and editor collaborations
