= Austin Film Critics Association Awards 2012 =

Annual US film awards ceremony

8th AFCA Awards

Best Film:
Zero Dark Thirty

The 8th Austin Film Critics Association Awards, honoring the best in filmmaking for 2012, were announced on December 18, 2012.

== Top 10 Films ==
1. Zero Dark Thirty
2. Argo
3. Moonrise Kingdom
4. Django Unchained
5. Cloud Atlas
6. Holy Motors
7. Beasts of the Southern Wild
8. The Master
9. Silver Linings Playbook
10. Looper

== Winners ==
- Best Film:
  - Zero Dark Thirty
- Best Director:
  - Paul Thomas Anderson – The Master
- Best Actor:
  - Joaquin Phoenix – The Master
- Best Actress:
  - Jennifer Lawrence – Silver Linings Playbook
- Best Supporting Actor:
  - Christoph Waltz – Django Unchained
- Best Supporting Actress:
  - Anne Hathaway – Les Misérables
- Best Original Screenplay:
  - Looper – Rian Johnson
- Best Adapted Screenplay:
  - Argo – Chris Terrio
- Best Cinematography:
  - The Master – Mihai Mălaimare Jr.
- Best Original Score:
  - Cloud Atlas – Reinhold Heil, Johnny Klimek, and Tom Tykwer
- Best Foreign Language Film:
  - Holy Motors • France
- Best Documentary:
  - The Imposter
- Best Animated Feature:
  - Wreck-It Ralph
- Best First Film:
  - Benh Zeitlin – Beasts of the Southern Wild
- Breakthrough Artist Award:
  - Quvenzhané Wallis – Beasts of the Southern Wild
- Austin Film Award:
  - Bernie – Richard Linklater
- Special Honorary Award:
  - Matthew McConaughey for his exceptional work in four films this year – Bernie, Killer Joe, Magic Mike, and The Paperboy
