= 2012 Los Angeles Film Critics Association Awards =

Annual US film awards ceremony

38th LAFCA Awards
- Date: December 9, 2012

Highlights
- Best Picture: Amour

The 38th Los Angeles Film Critics Association Awards, given by the Los Angeles Film Critics Association (LAFCA), honored the best in film for 2012.

== Winners ==
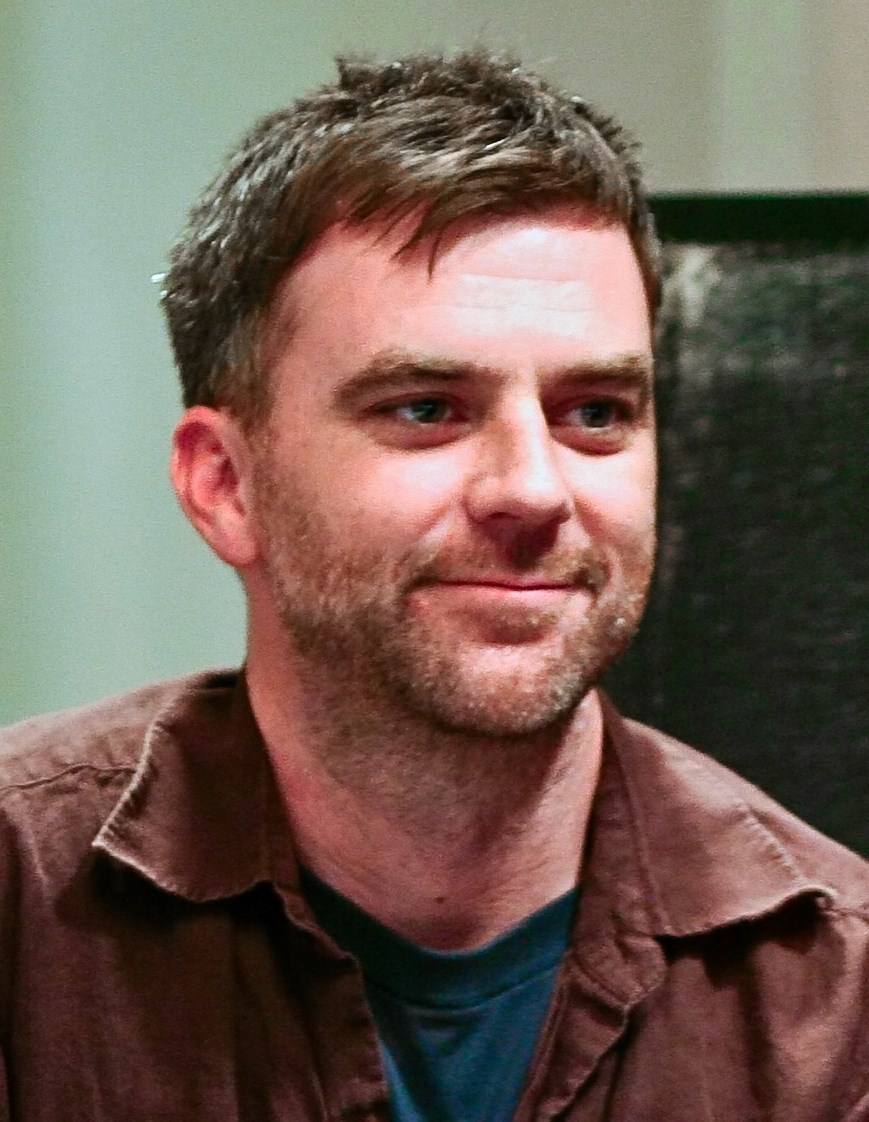
Paul Thomas Anderson, Best Director winner

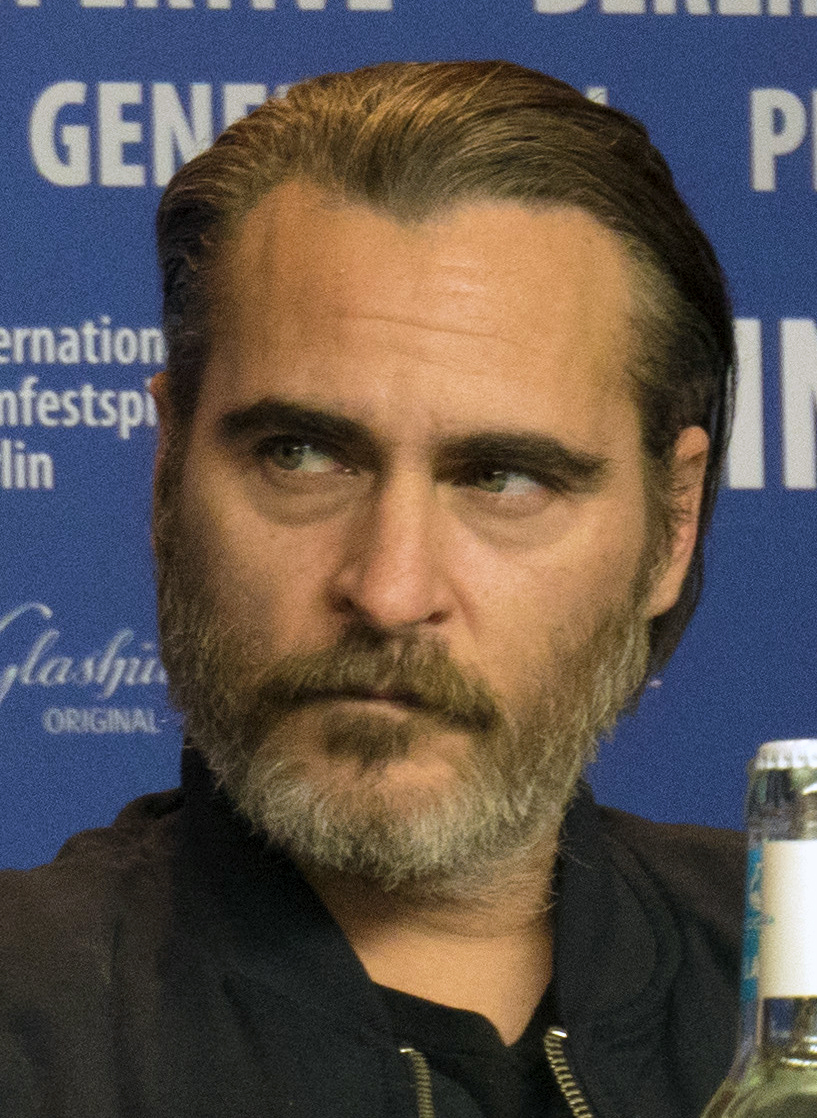
Joaquin Phoenix, Best Actor winner

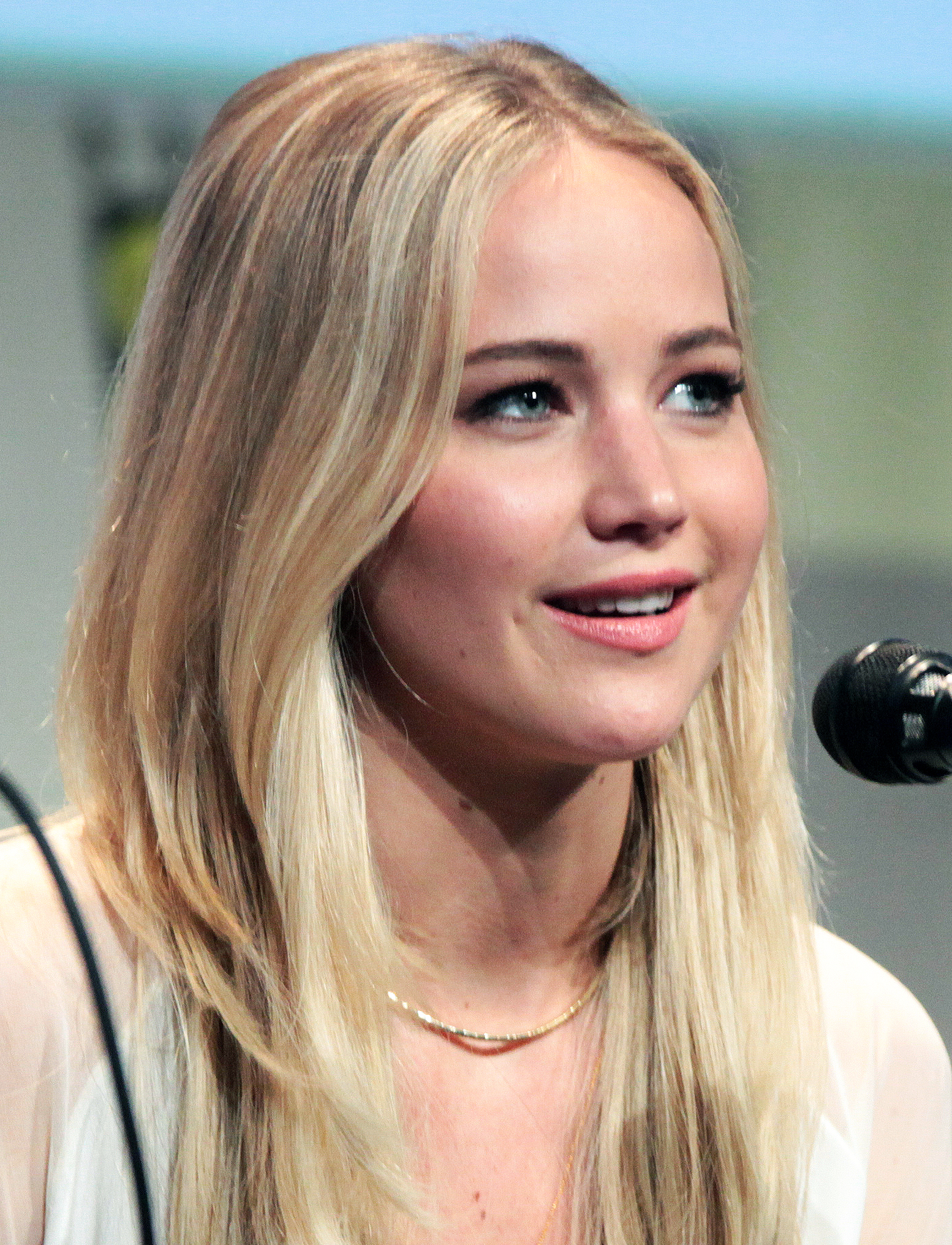
Jennifer Lawrence, Best Actress co-winner

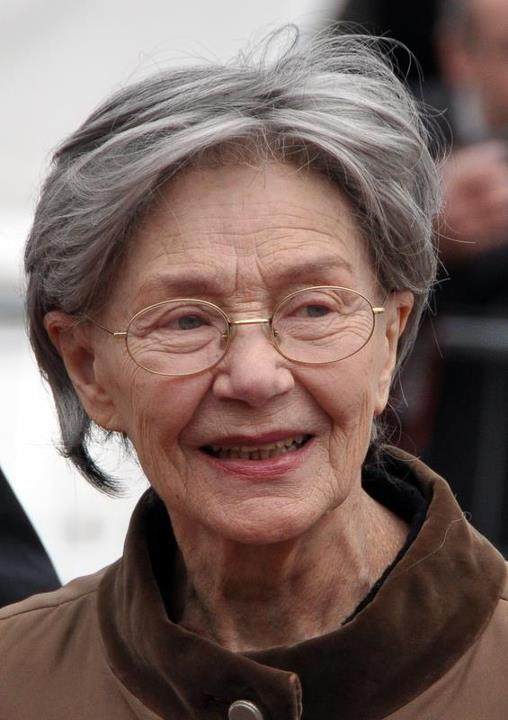
Emmanuelle Riva, Best Actress co-winner

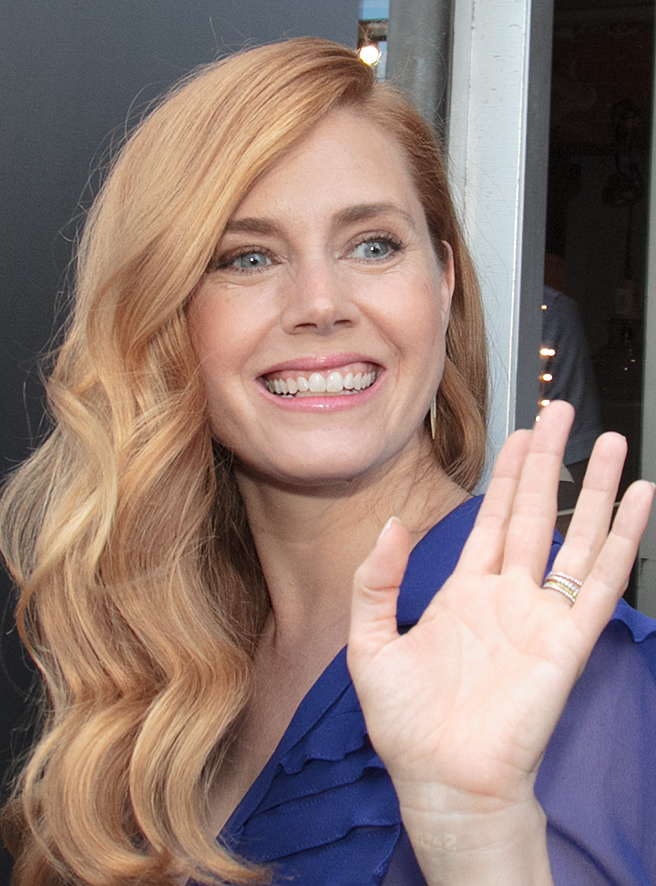
Amy Adams, Best Supporting Actress winner

- Best Picture:
  - Amour
  - Runner-up: The Master
- Best Director:
  - Paul Thomas Anderson – The Master
  - Runner-up: Kathryn Bigelow – Zero Dark Thirty
- Best Actor:
  - Joaquin Phoenix – The Master
  - Runner-up: Denis Lavant – Holy Motors
- Best Actress (TIE):
  - Jennifer Lawrence – Silver Linings Playbook
  - Emmanuelle Riva – Amour
- Best Supporting Actor:
  - Dwight Henry – Beasts of the Southern Wild
  - Runner-up: Christoph Waltz – Django Unchained
- Best Supporting Actress:
  - Amy Adams – The Master
  - Runner-up: Anne Hathaway – The Dark Knight Rises and Les Misérables
- Best Screenplay:
  - Chris Terrio – Argo
  - Runner-up: David O. Russell – Silver Linings Playbook
- Best Cinematography:
  - Roger Deakins – Skyfall
  - Runner-up: Mihai Mălaimare Jr. – The Master
- Best Editing:
  - Dylan Tichenor and William Goldenberg – Zero Dark Thirty
  - Runner-up: William Goldenberg – Argo
- Best Production Design:
  - David Crank and Jack Fisk – The Master
  - Runner-up: Adam Stockhausen – Moonrise Kingdom
- Best Music Score:
  - Dan Romer and Benh Zeitlin – Beasts of the Southern Wild
  - Runner-up: Jonny Greenwood – The Master
- Best Foreign Language Film:
  - Holy Motors • France/Germany
  - Runner-up: Footnote (Hearat Shulayim) • Israel
- Best Documentary/Non-Fiction Film:
  - The Gatekeepers
  - Runner-up: Searching for Sugar Man
- Best Animation:
  - Frankenweenie
  - Runner-up: It's Such a Beautiful Day
- New Generation Award:
  - Benh Zeitlin – Beasts of the Southern Wild
- Career Achievement Award:
  - Frederick Wiseman
- The Douglas Edwards Experimental/Independent Film/Video Award:
  - Lucien Castaing-Taylor and Véréna Paravel – Leviathan
