= Amour (2012 film) =

2012 film by Michael Haneke

- French theatrical release poster
- Directed by: Michael Haneke
- Written by: Michael Haneke
- Produced by: Margaret Ménégoz; Stefan Arndt; Veit Heiduschka; Michael Katz
- Starring: Jean-Louis Trintignant; Emmanuelle Riva; Isabelle Huppert
- Cinematography: Darius Khondji
- Edited by: Monika Willi; Nadine Muse
- Production companies: Les Films du Losange; X Filme Creative Pool; Wega Film; France 3 Cinéma; Canal+
- Distributed by: Les Films du Losange (France); X Verleih AG (through Warner Bros.) (Germany); Filmladen (Austria)
- Release dates: 20 May 2012 (Cannes); 20 September 2012 (Germany); 24 October 2012 (France)
- Running time: 127 minutes
- Countries: France; Austria; Germany
- Language: French
- Budget: $8.9–9.7 million
- Box office: $36.8 million

Amour (pronounced [a.muʁ]; lit. 'Love') is a 2012 romantic drama film written and directed by Michael Haneke, starring Jean-Louis Trintignant, Emmanuelle Riva and Isabelle Huppert. The narrative focuses on an elderly couple, Anne and Georges, who are retired music teachers with a daughter who lives abroad. One morning during breakfast, Anne has a stroke, and the ensuing complications reshape their lives. The film is an international co-production among the French, German, and Austrian companies Les Films du Losange, X Filme Creative Pool, and Wega Film.

Amour premiered at the 2012 Cannes Film Festival, where it won the Palme d'Or, making Haneke the second filmmaker to win for consecutive films. The film garnered widespread critical acclaim for its direction, screenplay, and performances by Trintignant and Riva. It is widely regarded by critics as one of the greatest films of the 21st century. Amour won the Academy Award for Best Foreign Language Film for Austria, and four nominations—including Best Picture, Best Director, and Best Actress—at the 85th Academy Awards, among numerous other accolades.

== Plot ==
After residents of a Paris apartment building complain of a smell coming from one of the apartments, the emergency services break down its door to find an elderly woman's corpse in the bedroom, adorned with cut flowers.

Several months before the opening scene, Anne and her husband Georges, both retired piano teachers in their eighties, attend a performance by one of Anne's former pupils, Alexandre. They return home to find that someone has unsuccessfully tried to break into their apartment. The next morning, while they are eating breakfast, Anne silently has a stroke. She sits in a catatonic state, not responding to Georges. She comes around as Georges is about to get help, but has no idea the stroke occurred. Georges is unable to persuade her to get medical attention until Anne finds she is unable to pour herself a drink.

Anne undergoes surgery on a blocked carotid artery, but the surgery goes wrong, leaving her paralyzed on her right side and reliant on a wheelchair. She makes Georges promise not to send her back to the hospital or to a nursing home. Georges becomes Anne's dutiful, though slightly irritated, caretaker. One day, Anne, seemingly having attempted to commit suicide by falling from a window, tells Georges she doesn't want to go on living. Alexandre, her former pupil whose performance they attended, stops by and Anne gets dressed up and carries on a lively conversation during the visit, giving Georges hope that her condition was temporary. But she soon has a second stroke that leaves her demented and incapable of coherent speech. Georges continues to look after Anne.

Georges begins employing a nurse three days a week. Their daughter, Eva, wants her mother to go into care, but Georges says he will not break the promise he made to Anne. He employs a second nurse, but fires her after he discovers she is mistreating Anne. One day, Georges sits next to Anne's bedside and tells her a story of his childhood, which calms her. As Anne closes her eyes, he quietly picks up a pillow and smothers her to death.

Georges returns home with bundles of flowers in his hands, which he proceeds to wash and cut. He picks out a dress from Anne's wardrobe and writes a long letter. He tapes the bedroom door shut and catches a pigeon that has flown in through the window. In the letter, Georges explains that he has released the pigeon. Georges imagines that Anne is washing dishes in the kitchen and, speechless, he gazes at her as she cleans up and prepares to leave the house. Anne calls for Georges to bring a coat, and he complies, following her out of the door.

The film concludes with a continuation of the opening scene, with Eva seated in the living room after wandering around the now-empty home.

== Cast ==
- Jean-Louis Trintignant as Georges Laurent
- Emmanuelle Riva as Anne Laurent
- Isabelle Huppert as Eva Laurent
- Alexandre Tharaud as Alexandre
- William Shimell as Geoff

Background characters appeared in the film: Rita Blanco as a concierge and Ramón Agirre as a concierge's husband; Carole Franck and Dinara Droukarova as nurses; Laurent Capelluto and Jean-Michel Monroc as police officers; Suzanne Schmidt as one of the couple's neighbors; and Walid Afkir and Damien Jouillerot as paramedics.

== Production ==
The film was produced for €7,290,000 through France's Les Films du Losange, Germany's X Filme Creative Pool and Austria's Wega Film. It received co-production support from France 3 Cinéma and €404,000 in support from the Île-de-France region. Further funding was granted by the Medienboard Berlin-Brandenburg in Germany and National Center of Cinematography and the moving image in France. Principal photography took place from 7 February to 1 April 2011.

After 14 years, Jean-Louis Trintignant came back on screen for Haneke. Haneke had sent Trintignant the script, which had been written specifically for him. Trintignant said that he chooses which films he works in on the basis of the director, and said of Haneke that "he has the most complete mastery of the cinematic discipline, from technical aspects like sound and photography to the way he handles actors".

The film is based on a situation that happened in Haneke's family. The issue that interested him the most was how to manage the suffering of someone you love.

Haneke called the collaboration with Jean-Louis Trintignant and the subject of the film the motivation to make the film. The starting point for Haneke's reflections was the suicide of his 90-year-old aunt, who had raised him. According to Haneke, she had heavy rheumatism and lived her last years alone in her apartment because she did not want to be placed in a nursing home. She had even asked Haneke for euthanasia. According to Haneke, the main theme of his script is not old age and death, but "the question of how to deal with the suffering of a loved one".

Haneke dealt with the matter since 1992. The work on the script was interrupted by a writer's block. Haneke normally wrote out the script exactly before the writing process. This time the end of the story was not clear to him. He began writing in the hope that this would occur to him at work, but this did not happen. "I have tormented myself terribly with the script and I was left with the impression that I have not succeeded in getting the hang of this topic", he said. At the same time the director realized that the Swiss-Canadian Léa Pool with La dernière fugue (2010) had created a similar story, about an old man who is taken care of by his wife. Therefore, he left the project in favor of another. He worked only sporadically on it, until his writer's block loosened and he could finish the script quickly. Haneke wrote it specifically for Trintignant, having already written the scripts for The Piano Teacher (2001) and Caché (2005) specifically for Isabelle Huppert and Daniel Auteuil. Haneke prefers this way of working, because in this way one "writes specifically something that fits to the advantages of each actor and helps to particularly work them out".

== Release ==
Artificial Eye acquired the distribution rights for the United Kingdom and by Sony Pictures Classics in the United States. It has been released on DVD, Blu-ray, and Digital mediums.

== Reception ==
Amour met with widespread acclaim from critics. Review aggregation website Rotten Tomatoes gives the film a score of 93% based on 223 reviews, with an average rating of 8.7/10. The website's critical consensus reads: "With towering performances and an unflinching script from Michael Haneke, Amour represents an honest, heartwrenching depiction of deep love and responsibility." Metacritic gives the film a weighted average rating of 95 out of 100, based on reviews from 44 critics, indicating "universal acclaim".

Writing for The Guardian after the Cannes screening, Peter Bradshaw said "this is film-making at the highest pitch of intelligence and insight", naming it the best film of 2012. Jamie Graham of Total Film gave Amour 5 stars out of 5, stating "far from being a cold, scientific study from a filmmaker frequently accused of placing a pane of glass between his work and his viewers, this sensitive film emerges heartfelt and humane." Dave Calhoun of Time Out London also gave the film 5 out of 5 stars, stating "Amour is devastatingly original and unflinching in the way it examines the effect of love on death, and vice versa". Calling Amour the best film of 2012, critic A. O. Scott of The New York Times said that "months after its debut at Cannes this film already feels permanent." Writing in The Times, critic Manohla Dargis hailed the film as "a masterpiece about life, death and everything in between." The newspaper flagged the film as a critics' pick. The Wall Street Journal's film critic Joe Morgenstern wrote of Amour: "Mr. Haneke's film, exquisitely photographed by Darius Khondji, has won all sorts of prizes all over the world, and no wonder; the performances alone set it off as a welcoming masterpiece." The Chicago Sun-Times gave the film four stars out of four. In 2024, Looper ranked it eighth on its list of the "50 Best PG-13 Movies of All Time", writing that the film "shatters your heart while reminding one of the kind of love that makes it possible to not lose all hope in the middle of life's miseries. This is one film that's as certain to impress on an emotional level as a technical one."

Among the few negative reviews, Calum Marsh of the Slant Magazine gave the film 2 out of 4 stars and indicated that the film "isn't the work of a newly moral or humanistic filmmaker, but another ruse by the same unscrupulous showman whose funny games have been beguiling us for years", adding that "Haneke's gaze, trained from an unbridgeable remove, carries no inflection of empathy; his style is too frigid, his investment too remote, for the world of these characters to open up before us, for their pain to ever feel like something more than functional."

=== Box office ===
The film earned $6,739,492 in the U.S. It grossed $36,784,044 worldwide on an $8.9 million budget.

=== Accolades ===
Amour received five nominations at the 85th Academy Awards: Best Picture, Best Actress in a Leading Role (Riva), Best Original Screenplay (Haneke) and Best Director (Haneke). At 85, Riva is the oldest nominee for Best Actress in a Leading Role. It won the Academy Award for Best Foreign Language Film.

At the 25th European Film Awards, Amour was nominated in six categories, winning in four, including Best Film and Best Director. At the 47th National Society of Film Critics Awards it won Best Film, Best Director and Best Actress. At the 66th British Academy Film Awards, it was nominated in four categories, winning for Best Leading Actress and Best Film Not in the English Language. Riva became the oldest person to win a BAFTA. At the 38th César Awards, it was nominated in ten categories, winning in five, including Best Film, Best Director, Best Actor and Best Actress.

List of Accolades
Award / Film Festival	Category	Recipient(s)	Result
85th Academy Awards	Best Picture	Margaret Ménégoz, Stefan Arndt, Veit Heiduschka and Michael Katz	Nominated
85th Academy Awards	Best Director	Michael Haneke	Nominated
85th Academy Awards	Best Actress	Emmanuelle Riva	Nominated
85th Academy Awards	Best Original Screenplay	Michael Haneke	Nominated
85th Academy Awards	Best Foreign Language Film	Austria	Won
2nd AACTA International Awards	Best International Actress	Emmanuelle Riva	Nominated
7th Alliance of Women Film Journalists Award	Top 10 Films	Amour	Won
7th Alliance of Women Film Journalists Award	Best Non-English-Language Film	Amour	Won
7th Alliance of Women Film Journalists Award	Best Actress	Emmanuelle Riva	Nominated
7th Alliance of Women Film Journalists Award	Best Original Screenplay	Michael Haneke	Nominated
7th Alliance of Women Film Journalists Award	Actress Defying Age and Ageism	Emmanuelle Riva	Nominated
34th Bavarian Film Awards	Best Director	Michael Haneke	Won
66th Bodil Awards	Best Non-American Film	Amour	Won
33rd Boston Society of Film Critics Award	Best Foreign Film	Amour	Won
33rd Boston Society of Film Critics Award	Best Actress	Emmanuelle Riva	Won
66th British Academy Film Awards	Best Leading Actress	Emmanuelle Riva	Won
66th British Academy Film Awards	Best Director	Michael Haneke	Nominated
66th British Academy Film Awards	Best Original Screenplay	Michael Haneke	Nominated
66th British Academy Film Awards	Best Film Not in the English Language	Amour	Won
2012 British Film Institute	Top 10 Films	Amour	Won
15th British Independent Film Awards	Best International Independent Film	Amour	Nominated
65th Cannes Film Festival	Palme d'Or	Michael Haneke	Won
38th César Awards	Best Film	Amour	Won
38th César Awards	Best Director	Michael Haneke	Won
38th César Awards	Best Actor	Jean-Louis Trintignant	Won
38th César Awards	Best Actress	Emmanuelle Riva	Won
38th César Awards	Best Supporting Actress	Isabelle Huppert	Nominated
38th César Awards	Best Original Screenplay	Michael Haneke	Won
38th César Awards	Best Production Design	Jean-Vincent Puzos	Nominated
38th César Awards	Best Cinematography	Darius Khondji	Nominated
38th César Awards	Best Editing	Monika Willi	Nominated
38th César Awards	Best Sound	Guillaume Sciama, Nadine Muse, Jean-Pierre Laforce	Nominated
23rd Chicago Film Critics Awards	Best Actress	Emmanuelle Riva	Nominated
23rd Chicago Film Critics Awards	Best Foreign-Language Film	Amour	Won
18th Critics' Choice Awards	Best Actress	Emmanuelle Riva	Nominated
18th Critics' Choice Awards	Best Foreign Language Film	Amour	Won
19th Dallas-Fort Worth Film Critics Awards	Best Actress	Emmanuelle Riva	Nominated
19th Dallas-Fort Worth Film Critics Awards	Best Foreign Language Film	Amour	Won
33rd Durban International Film Festival	Best Feature Film Award	Michael Haneke	Won
25th European Film Awards	European Film	Amour	Won
25th European Film Awards	European Director	Michael Haneke	Won
25th European Film Awards	European Actor	Jean-Louis Trintignant	Won
25th European Film Awards	European Actress	Emmanuelle Riva	Won
25th European Film Awards	European Screenwriter	Michael Haneke	Nominated
25th European Film Awards	Carlo di Palma European Cinematographer Award	Darius Khondji	Nominated
65th FIPRESCI Awards	Grand Prix	Amour	Won
6th Gaudí Awards	Best European Film	Amour	Won
70th Golden Globe Awards	Best Foreign Language Film	Amour	Won
60th Golden Reel Awards	Best Sound Editing - Sound Effects, Foley, Dialogue and ADR in a Foreign Feature Film	Amour	Nominated
48th Guldbagge Awards	Best Foreign Film	Amour	Won
28th Goya Awards	Best European Film	Amour	Won
6th Houston Film Critics Awards	Best Foreign Language Film	Amour	Nominated
6th Houston Film Critics Awards	Best Actress	Emmanuelle Riva	Nominated
28th Independent Spirit Awards	Best International Film	Michael Haneke	Won
10th Irish Film & Television Awards	Best International Film	Amour	Nominated
10th Irish Film & Television Awards	Best International Actress	Emmanuelle Riva	Nominated
33rd London Film Critics Circle Awards	Film of the Year	Amour	Won
33rd London Film Critics Circle Awards	Foreign Language Film of the Year	Amour	Nominated
33rd London Film Critics Circle Awards	Actor of the Year	Jean-Louis Trintignant	Nominated
33rd London Film Critics Circle Awards	Actress of the Year	Emmanuelle Riva	Won
33rd London Film Critics Circle Awards	Supporting Actress of the Year	Isabelle Huppert	Nominated
33rd London Film Critics Circle Awards	Director of the Year	Michael Haneke	Nominated
33rd London Film Critics Circle Awards	Screenwriter of the Year	Michael Haneke	Won
38th Los Angeles Film Critics Awards	Best Film	Amour	Won
38th Los Angeles Film Critics Awards	Best Actress	Emmanuelle Riva	Won
18th Lumière Awards	Best Film	Amour	Won
18th Lumière Awards	Best Actress	Emmanuelle Riva	Won
18th Lumière Awards	Best Actor	Jean-Louis Trintignant	Won
18th Lumière Awards	Best Director	Michael Haneke	Nominated
84th National Board of Review	Best Foreign Language Film	Amour	Won
47th National Society of Film Critics Awards	Best Film	Amour	Won
47th National Society of Film Critics Awards	Best Director	Michael Haneke	Won
47th National Society of Film Critics Awards	Best Actress	Emmanuelle Riva	Won
78th New York Film Critics Circle Awards	Best Foreign Language Film	Amour	Won
78th New York Film Critics Circle Awards	Best Actress	Emmanuelle Riva	Nominated
12th New York Film Critics Online Awards	Best Foreign Film	Amour	Won
12th New York Film Critics Online Awards	Best Actress	Emmanuelle Riva	Won
16th Online Film Critics Society Awards	Best Film Not in the English Language	Amour	Nominated
16th Online Film Critics Society Awards	Best Actress	Emmanuelle Riva	Nominated
15th Polish Academy Awards	Best European Film	Amour	Won
69th Prix Louis Delluc	Best Film	Amour	Nominated
17th San Diego Film Critics Society Awards	Best Foreign Language Film	Amour	Nominated
14th San Francisco Film Critics Awards	Best Foreign Film	Amour	Won
14th San Francisco Film Critics Awards	Best Actress	Emmanuelle Riva	Won
17th Satellite Awards	Best Foreign Language Film	Amour	Nominated
17th Satellite Awards	Best Actress	Emmanuelle Riva	Nominated
2012 The Globe and Mail Review	Best Film	Amour	Won
2012 The Village Voice Poll	Best Film	Amour	Won
2012 The Village Voice Poll	Best Actress	Emmanuelle Riva	Nominated
2012 The Village Voice Poll	Best Actor	Jean-Louis Trintignant	Nominated
16th Toronto Film Critics Association Awards	Best Foreign Language Film	Amour	Won
16th Toronto Film Critics Association Awards	Best Picture	Amour	Nominated
16th Toronto Film Critics Association Awards	Best Actress	Emmanuelle Riva	Nominated
13th Vancouver Film Critics Circle	Best Film	Amour	Nominated
11th WDCAFCA Awards	Best Foreign Language Film	Amour	Won
11th WDCAFCA Awards	Best Actress	Emmanuelle Riva	Nominated

== Legacy ==
Both Sight & Sound film magazine and Peter Bradshaw of The Guardian named Amour the third-best film of 2012.

In 2016, Amour was named the 42nd-best film of the 21st century in a poll of 177 film critics from around the world. It was 69th on BBC's 2018 list of the 100 greatest foreign-language films as voted by 209 film critics from 43 countries.

In 2025, it ranked 75th on The New York Times's list of "The 100 Best Movies of the 21st Century" and was among the films voted for the "Readers' Choice" edition of the list, finishing 246th. Filmmakers Pedro Almodóvar and Erik Messerschmidt, actresses Vicky Krieps, Lesley Manville, Julianne Moore and June Squibb, and composer Carter Burwell all listed the film as among their favorites of the 21st century.

== See also ==
- Isabelle Huppert on screen and stage
- List of submissions to the 85th Academy Awards for Best Foreign Language Film
- List of Austrian submissions for the Academy Award for Best Foreign Language Film
