= Leslie Jones (film editor) =

American film editor

- Born: California, U.S.
- Occupation: Film editor
- Parent: Robert C. Jones
- Relatives: Harmon Jones (grandfather)

Leslie Jones is an American film editor. She is known for her work on The Thin Red Line (1998), earning an Academy Award nomination for Best Film Editing, as well as her collaborations with director Paul Thomas Anderson on his films Punch-Drunk Love (2002), The Master (2012) and Inherent Vice (2014).

== Biography ==
Jones is the daughter of film editor Robert C. Jones and the granddaughter of editor Harmon Jones, each of whom has been nominated for an Academy Award for editing. Jones was the assistant editor for her father on two films, See No Evil, Hear No Evil and The Babe. She has several editing credits for independent films and documentaries, and was the associate editor on Grumpier Old Men. Her first editing credit on a major studio film was for Murder at 1600, which she co-edited with Billy Weber. Jones, Weber and Saar Klein were widely recognized for the film The Thin Red Line. They were nominated for an Academy Award, an American Cinema Editors Eddie Award and a Satellite Award. Jones has also collaborated with Paul Thomas Anderson on several films. She was nominated for an Eddie Award.

== Filmography ==
Editor
Year	Film	Director	Notes
1997	Murder at 1600	Dwight H. Little	
1998	The Thin Red Line	Terrence Malick	
2000	Woman on Top	Fina Torres	
2001	CQ	Roman Coppola	
2002	Punch-Drunk Love	Paul Thomas Anderson	First collaboration with Paul Thomas Anderson
2004	Starsky & Hutch	Todd Phillips	First collaboration with Todd Phillips
2006	School for Scoundrels	Todd Phillips	Second collaboration with Todd Phillips
2009	Cirque du Freak: The Vampire's Assistant	Paul Weitz	First collaboration with Paul Weitz
2010	Little Fockers	Paul Weitz	Second collaboration with Paul Weitz
2012	The Words	Brian Klugman; Lee Sternthal	
2012	The Master	Paul Thomas Anderson	Second collaboration with Paul Thomas Anderson
2013	In Secret	Charlie Stratton	
2014	Inherent Vice	Paul Thomas Anderson	Third collaboration with Paul Thomas Anderson
2016	20th Century Women	Mike Mills	
2016	Rules Don't Apply	Warren Beatty	
2021	Come from Away	Christopher Ashley	
2022	Dog	Channing Tatum; Reid Carolin	
2023	Fool's Paradise	Charlie Day	
2024	The Piano Lesson	Malcolm Washington	

Editorial department
Year	Film	Director	Role	Notes
1987	Munchies	Tina Hirsch	Second assistant editor	
1987	Weeds	John D. Hancock	Assistant film editor	
1987	Nightflyers	Robert Collector	Apprentice editor	
1989	See No Evil, Hear No Evil	Arthur Hiller	Assistant editor	First collaboration with Arthur Hiller
1990	Ghost Dad	Sidney Poitier	Assistant editor	
1992	The Babe	Arthur Hiller	First assistant editor	Second collaboration with Arthur Hiller
1992	The Bodyguard	Mick Jackson	Assistant editor	
1993	Rookie of the Year	Daniel Stern	First assistant editor	
1994	Little Giants	Duwayne Dunham	First assistant film editor	
1995	Virtuosity	Brett Leonard	Assistant editor	
1995	Grumpier Old Men	Howard Deutch	Associate film editor	
2024	Upgraded	Carlson Young	Additional editor	

Documentaries

Editor
Year	Film	Director
1995	Wild Bill: Hollywood Maverick	Todd Robinson

Shorts

Editor
Year	Film	Director
1992	Angel Fire	Todd Robinson
1992	Ballad of Tina Juarez	Juan Uribe

Thanks
Year	Film	Director	Role
2012	Bored Games	Jonathan Fischer	Additional acknowledgments

TV series

Editor
Year	Title	Notes
2020	Tales from the Loop	1 episode

TV shorts

Editor
Year	Film	Director
2019	The Summer People	Todd Louiso
