= Mihai Mălaimare Jr. =

Romanian cinematographer (born 1975)

- Born: 1975 (age 50–51); Bucharest, Socialist Republic of Romania
- Education: Caragiale National University of Theatre and Film
- Occupation: Cinematographer
- Father: Mihai Mălaimare

Mihai Mălaimare Jr. (Romanian pronunciation: [miˈhaj məlajˈmare]; born 1975) is a Romanian cinematographer.

== Background ==
Born in Bucharest, he is the son of the Romanian actor and former politician Mihai Mălaimare.

He studied at the Caragiale National University of Theatre and Film in Bucharest.

In 2023, he became a member of the American Society of Cinematographers.

== Filmography ==
=== Short film ===
Year	Title	Director	Notes
2003	18:36	Ionuț Giurgiuca	
2005	A Lineman's Cabin	Constantin Popescu	
2009	Sunset	Oana Marian	
2011	Take This Lollipop	Jason Zada	
2020	Two for Dinner	Eleanor Coppola	Segment of Love Is Love Is Love

=== Feature film ===
Year	Title	Director	Ref.
2004	Lotus	Ioan Cărmăzan	
2006	Păcală se întoarce	Geo Saizescu	
2007	Youth Without Youth	Francis Ford Coppola	
2009	Tetro	Francis Ford Coppola	
2011	Twixt	Francis Ford Coppola	
2012	The Master	Paul Thomas Anderson	
2012	The Time Being	Nenad Cicin-Sain	
2012	Little Red Wagon	David Anspaugh	
2013	+1	Dennis Iliadis	
2014	A Walk Among the Tombstones	Scott Frank	
2016	Distant Vision	Francis Ford Coppola	
2016	Nina	Cynthia Mort	
2017	Sleepless	Baran bo Odar	
2017	November Criminals	Sacha Gervasi	
2018	Delirium	Dennis Iliadis	
2018	The Hate U Give	George Tillman Jr.	
2019	Jojo Rabbit	Taika Waititi	
2021	The Harder They Fall	Jeymes Samuel	
2024	Megalopolis	Francis Ford Coppola	

Documentary film

Year	Title	Director	Ref.
2015	Hitchcock/Truffaut	Kent Jones	

=== Television ===
Year	Title	Director	Notes
2012	The Super Dimensional Quantum Learning's; Problems and Solutions Gametime Spectacular!!	Jon M. Gibson	Episodes "Slo-Mo" and "Anti-Gravity"
2015	Pariah	Rob McElhenney	TV movie
2020	For Life	George Tillman Jr.	Episode "Pilot"
2022	Winning Time: The Rise of the Lakers Dynasty	Damian Marcano; Payman Benz	4 episodes

== Awards and nominations ==
Year	Title	Award/Nomination
2007	Youth Without Youth	Nominated- Independent Spirit Award for Best Cinematography
2012	The Master	Boston Society of Film Critics Award for Best Cinematography; National Society of Film Critics Award for Best Cinematography; Chicago Film Critics Association Award for Best Cinematography; Nominated- Critics’ Choice Movie Award for Best Cinematography; Nominated- Los Angeles Film Critics Award for Best Cinematography; Nominated- Online Film Critics Society Award for Best Cinematography; Nominated- Satellite Award for Best Cinematography; Nominated- Washington D.C. Film Critics Award for Best Cinematography
2019	Jojo Rabbit	Hollywood Film Award for Cinematography
