= Matthew McConaughey filmography =

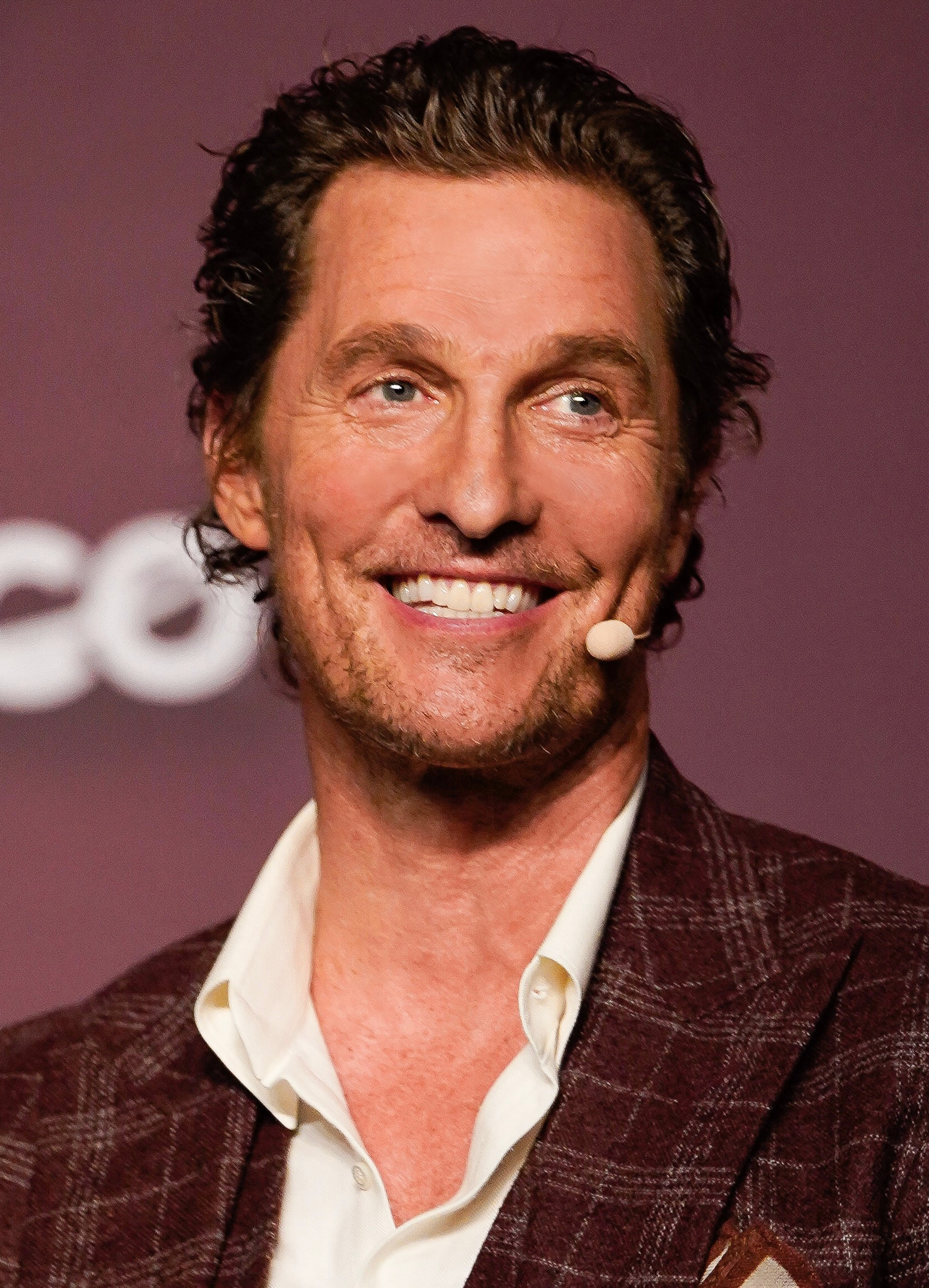
McConaughey in 2019

Matthew McConaughey is an American actor who made his breakthrough by starring in the Richard Linklater-directed coming of age comedy Dazed and Confused in 1993. His first lead role was in the 1996 film adaptation of the John Grisham novel A Time to Kill. The following year, McConaughey played the lawyer Roger Sherman Baldwin opposite Morgan Freeman and Anthony Hopkins in the Steven Spielberg-directed historical drama Amistad, and also starred opposite Jodie Foster in the Robert Zemeckis-directed science fiction drama Contact. In 1998, he appeared in the Linklater-directed comedy-drama The Newton Boys. During the 2000s, McConaughey was typecast as a romantic comedy lead in the films The Wedding Planner (2001), How to Lose a Guy in 10 Days (2003), Failure to Launch (2006), and Ghosts of Girlfriends Past (2009).

In the early 2010s, McConaughey became better known for his dramatic roles. This reinvention was cited in the media as the "McConaissance" and started when he played Mickey Haller in the adaptation of the Michael Connelly novel of the same name The Lincoln Lawyer, and reunited with Linklater on the black comedy Bernie (both 2011). In the same year he played the title role in the Southern Gothic crime film Killer Joe, for which he received the Saturn Award for Best Actor. The following year he starred in the coming-of-age drama Mud (2012), and also played a supporting role in the Steven Soderbergh-directed comedy drama Magic Mike (2012).

McConaughey's next role was as Ron Woodroof in the 2013 biographical drama Dallas Buyers Club. His performance garnered him the Academy Award for Best Actor, the Golden Globe Award for Best Actor (Drama), and the Screen Actors Guild Award for Outstanding Performance by a Male Actor in a Leading Role. He also appeared in the Martin Scorsese-directed The Wolf of Wall Street in 2013. In 2014, McConaughey played detective Rust Cohle in the television crime drama series True Detective and starred in the Christopher Nolan-directed science fiction film Interstellar. The former earned McConaughey a nomination for the Primetime Emmy Award for Outstanding Lead Actor in a Drama Series and the Critics' Choice Television Award for Best Actor in a Drama Series.

In 2015, McConaughey starred alongside Ken Watanabe and Naomi Watts in the Gus Van Sant-directed film The Sea of Trees. A year later, he starred in the Gary Ross-directed historical war film, Free State of Jones, in which he appeared as Newton Knight, a Mississippi farmer. He was nominated for a Women Film Critics Circle for Best Actor. In the same year, he also starred in the Stephen Gaghan-directed crime adventure Gold, and won the Hollywood Ensemble Award at the 20th Hollywood Film Awards and a Saturn Award nomination for Best Actor. In 2019, McConaughey co-starred with Anne Hathaway in the neo-noir Thriller Serenity directed by Steven Knight, this film earned him a nomination for Worst Actor at the 40th Golden Raspberry Awards.

== Film ==
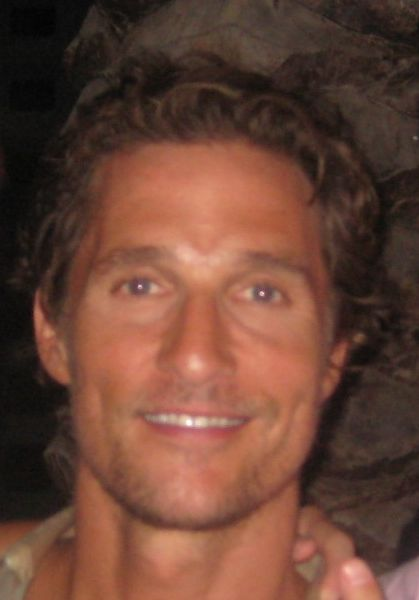
McConaughey, 2008

Year	Title	Role(s)	Notes	Ref(s)
1992	Chicano Chariots	—N/a	Short film; Director only	
1993	My Boyfriend's Back	Guy #2		
1993	Dazed and Confused	David Wooderson		
1994	Angels in the Outfield	Ben Williams		
1995	The Return of the Texas Chainsaw Massacre	Vilmer Slaughter	Also known as Texas Chainsaw Massacre: The Next Generation	
1995	Boys on the Side	Officer Abe Lincoln		
1995	Glory Daze	Rental Truck Guy		
1995	Scorpion Spring	El Rojo		
1996	Lone Star	Buddy Deeds		
1996	A Time to Kill	Jake Brigance		
1996	Larger than Life	Tip Tucker		
1997	Contact	Palmer Joss		
1997	Amistad	Roger Sherman Baldwin		
1998	The Newton Boys	Willis Newton		
1998	Making Sandwiches	Bud Hoagie	Short film; Also producer	
1998	The Rebel	—N/a	Short film; Producer, writer, and director only	
1999	EDtv	Ed Pekurny		
2000	U-571	Lt. Andrew Tyler		
2001	The Wedding Planner	Steve Edison		
2001	Frailty	Fenton/Adam Meiks		
2002	Thirteen Conversations About One Thing	Troy		
2002	Reign of Fire	Denton Van Zan		
2003	How to Lose a Guy in 10 Days	Benjamin Barry		
2003	Tiptoes	Steven		
2005	Sahara	Dirk Pitt	Also executive producer	
2005	Magnificent Desolation: Walking on the Moon 3D	Al Bean	Documentary; Voice role	
2005	Two for the Money	Brandon Lang		
2006	Failure to Launch	Tripp		
2006	We Are Marshall	Jack Lengyel		
2008	Fool's Gold	Ben "Finn" Finnegan		
2008	Tropic Thunder	Rick Peck		
2008	Surfer, Dude	Steve Addington	Also producer	
2009	Ghosts of Girlfriends Past	Connor Mead		
2011	The Lincoln Lawyer	Mickey Haller		
2011	Bernie	Danny Buck Davidson		
2011	Killer Joe	"Killer" Joe Cooper		
2012	Mud	Mud		
2012	Magic Mike	Dallas		
2012	The Paperboy	Ward Jansen		
2013	Dallas Buyers Club	Ron Woodroof	Academy Award for Best Actor	
2013	The Wolf of Wall Street	Mark Hanna		
2014	Interstellar	Cooper		
2015	The Sea of Trees	Arthur Brennan		
2016	Free State of Jones	Newton Knight		
2016	Kubo and the Two Strings	Beetle	Voice role	
2016	Sing	Buster Moon	Voice role	
2016	Gold	Kenny Wells	Also producer	
2017	The Dark Tower	Walter Padick		
2018	White Boy Rick	Richard Wershe Sr.		
2019	Serenity	Baker Dill		
2019	The Beach Bum	Moondog		
2019	Between Two Ferns: The Movie	Himself	Cameo	
2019	The Gentlemen	Mickey Pearson	Also co-producer	
2021	Sing 2	Buster Moon	Voice role	
2022	Deep in the Heart: A Texas Wildlife Story	Narrator	Documentary	
2024	Deadpool & Wolverine	Cowboypool	Voice cameo	
2024	Sing: Thriller	Buster Moon	Voice role; short film	
2025	The Rivals of Amziah King	Amziah King		
2025	The Lost Bus	Kevin McKay		
TBA	Positano			

== Television ==
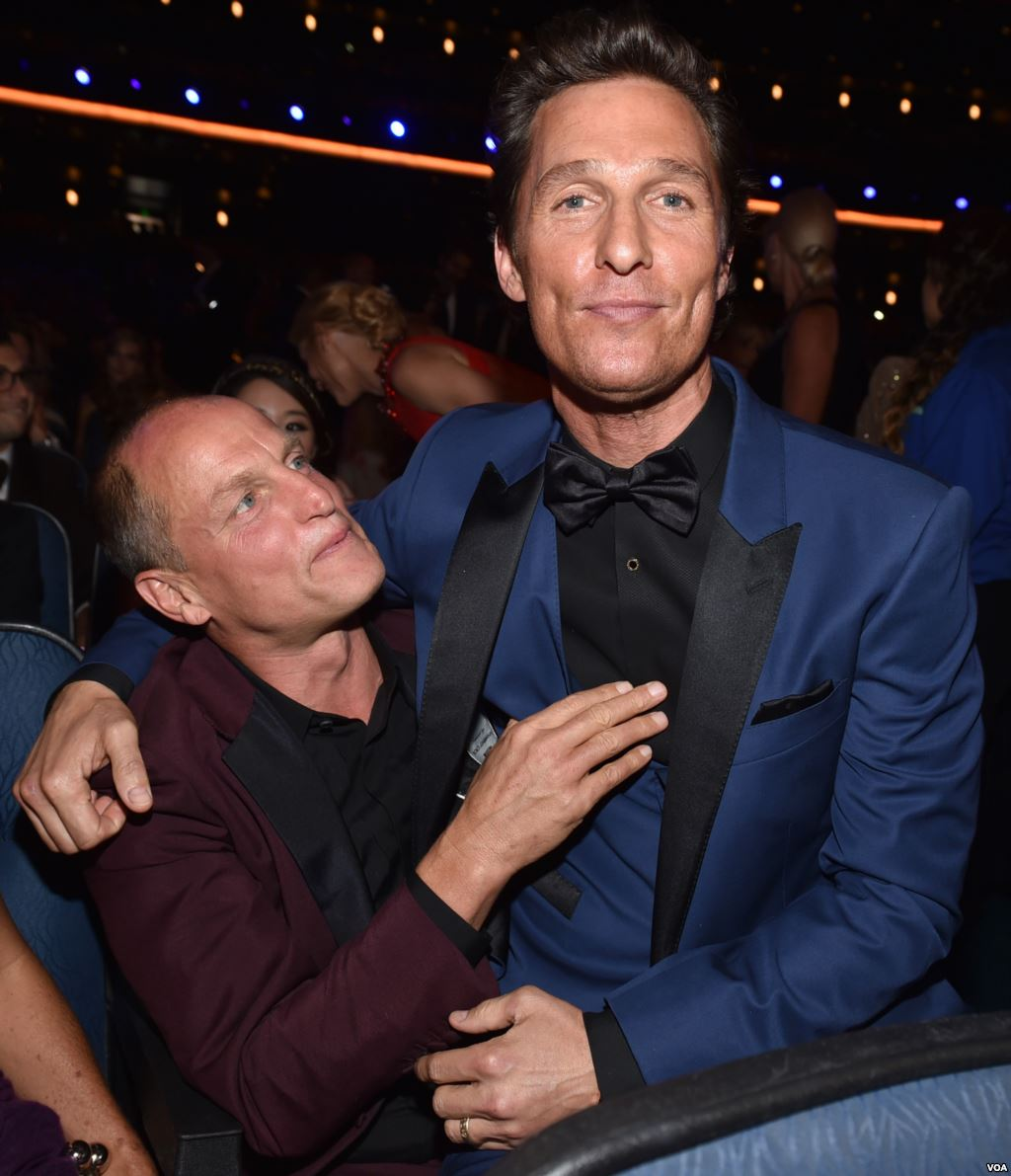
McConaughey (right) with True Detective co-star Woody Harrelson (left) at the 66th Primetime Emmy Awards in 2014

Year	Title	Role	Notes	Ref.
1992	Unsolved Mysteries	Larry Dickens	Episode: #5.12	
1999	King of the Hill	Rad Thibodeaux	Voice role; episode: "The Wedding of Bobby Hill"	
2000	Sex and the City	Himself	Episode: "Escape from New York"	
2003	Freedom: A History of US	Charles Fenno Hoffman / Alexander H. Stephens / Captain W. W. Wood / Andrew Johnson / John Swinton / Mark Twain	Voice role; 6 episodes	
2003–2015	Saturday Night Live	Himself (host)	2 episodes	
2010–2012	Eastbound & Down	Roy McDaniel	3 episodes	
2014	True Detective	Rustin "Rust" Cohle	Season 1; also executive producer	
2023	Agent Elvis	Elvis Presley	Voice role; also executive producer	
2026	Brothers	Himself	Main role; also executive producer	

== Music videos ==
Year	Title	Artist	Role	Ref.
1992	"Walkaway Joe"	Trisha Yearwood ft. Don Henley	Walkaway Joe	
1994	"Life in Vain"	Daniel Johnston	Man with shovel	
1996	"Key West Intermezzo (I Saw You First)"	John Mellencamp	Male lead	
2012	"Synthesizers"	Butch Walker and The Black Widows	David Wooderson	
2024	"Nine Ball"	Zach Bryan	Male lead	

== Video games ==
Year	Title	Role	Notes	Ref.
2027	Exodus	C.C. Orlev	Voice	

== See also ==
- List of awards and nominations received by Matthew McConaughey
