= List of awards and nominations received by Matthew McConaughey =

Matthew McConaughey awards and nominations
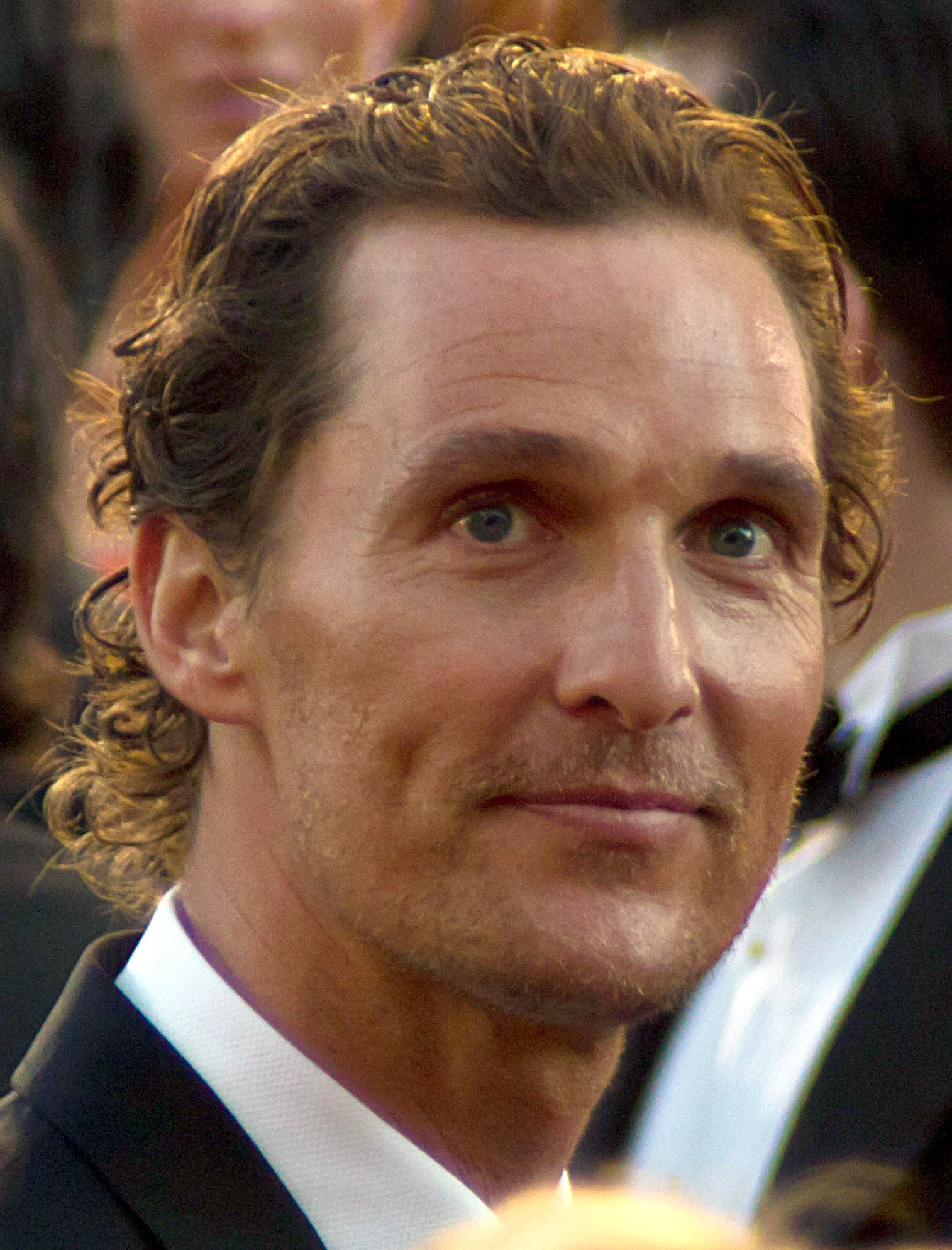
- McConaughey at the 83rd Academy Awards in 2011
Awards and nominations (Note: Certain award groups do not simply award one winner, as they may recognize several recipients and have runners-up. Since this is a specific recognition and is different from losing an award, runner-up mentions are considered wins in the awards tally.) (Note: Awards in certain categories do not have prior nominations and only winners are announced by the jury. For simplification and to avoid errors, each award in this list has been presumed to have had a prior nomination.) (Note: Organizations without a Wikipedia page are not included in list of accolades.)
Award	Wins	Nominations
Totals
AACTA Awards	0	1
Academy Awards	1	1
Alliance of Women Film Journalists	1	1
American Cinematheque Award	1	1
Austin Film Critics Association	1	1
Blockbuster Entertainment Awards	0	2
Boston Society of Film Critics	1	1
Chicago Film Critics Association	0	2
Crime Thriller Awards	1	1
Critics' Choice Movie Awards	1	3
Critics' Choice Television Awards	1	1
Dallas–Fort Worth Film Critics Association	1	1
Detroit Film Critics Society	1	4
Dorian Awards	1	2
Dublin Film Critics' Circle	0	2
Fangoria Chainsaw Awards	1	1
Film Independent Spirit Awards	3	4
Florida Film Critics Circle	1	1
Goldene Kamera	1	1
Golden Globe Awards	1	2
Georgia Film Critics Association	0	2
Gotham Independent Film Awards	1	2
Hollywood Film Awards	2	2
Houston Film Critics Society	0	3
Irish Film & Television Academy	0	1
MTV Movie Awards	1	4
National Society of Film Critics	1	1
New Orleans Film Society	1	1
New York Film Critics Circle	1	1
Online Film Critics Society	0	1
Palm Springs International Film Festival	1	1
People's Choice Awards	1	1
Primetime Emmy Awards	0	2
Producers Guild of America Award	0	1
Rome Film Festival	1	1
Russian National Movie Awards	1	2
San Diego Film Critics Society	0	2
San Francisco Film Critics Circle	0	1
Sant Jordi Awards	1	1
Satellite Awards	1	1
Saturn Awards	1	3
Screen Actors Guild Awards	1	3
St. Louis Gateway Film Critics Association	1	1
TCA Awards	1	1
Teen Choice Awards	0	5
Toronto Film Critics Association	1	1
Vancouver Film Critics Circle	0	1
Village Voice Film Poll	1	5
Washington D.C. Area Film Critics Association	0	1
Women Film Critics Circle	0	1
Wins	37
Runner-up	3
Nominations	86

Matthew McConaughey is an American actor and producer who rose to prominence with his role in the 1993 ensemble comedy film Dazed and Confused. The film was well received by critics. Since then, McConaughey has received various awards and nominations, including an Academy Award, a Golden Globe, a Screen Actors Guild Award, two Critics' Choice Awards, an MTV Movie Award and a People’s Choice Award. He has also been nominated for five Teen Choice Awards and two Emmys.

Three years after his role in Dazed and Confused, in 1996, McConaughey played the lead role of a lawyer in the movie A Time to Kill, for which he won the MTV Movie Award for Best Breakthrough Performance. His next appearances—in the science fiction drama Contact (1997), alongside Jodie Foster, and the war film U-571 (2000)—garnered him two Blockbuster Entertainment Award nominations. In the early 2000s, he starred in multiple romantic comedies, including The Wedding Planner (2001) and How to Lose a Guy in 10 Days (2003), for which he received four Teen Choice Award nominations. He received two more nominations and the People's Choice Award for Favorite Male Action Star for his role in the 2005 action-comedy film Sahara.

McConaughey received the National Society of Film Critics Award for Best Supporting Actor for his role in Bernie (2011) and Magic Mike (2012) and was also awarded the Critics' Choice Movie Award in the same category for the latter. He played the role of a hit man in the black comedy crime film Killer Joe (2011) for which he was awarded the Saturn Award for Best Actor. In the same year, McConaughey starred in Mud (2012), which earned him the Independent Spirit Robert Altman Award. The following year, McConaughey played lead role of Ron Woodroof, a real life AIDS patient in the 1980s, in the biopic drama Dallas Buyers Club to critical acclaim. He won the Academy Award, Critics' Choice Movie Award, Golden Globe and a Screen Actors Guild Award for his role in the film. In 2014, he starred in the epic sci-fi Interstellar for which he received a Saturn Award for Best Actor nomination. In November of the same year, he was inducted to the Hollywood Walk of Fame. McConaughey co-produced and acted in the crime anthology television series True Detective, which earned him Lead Actor nominations for a Screen Actors Guild Award, Critics' Choice Television Award and a Golden Globe. He also received two Primetime Emmy nominations, one for his role as an actor and other for his role as an executive producer as well as a Producers Guild of America Award nomination. For his roles in the war film Free State of Jones and Gold (both 2016), he was nominated for the Women Film Critics Circle Award for Best Actor and the Saturn Award for Best Actor, respectively.

== Awards and nominations ==
Organizations	Year	Category/award	Work	Result	Ref.
AACTA International Awards	2014	Best Actor	Dallas Buyers Club	Nominated	
Academy Awards	2014	Best Actor	Dallas Buyers Club	Won	
EDA Awards	2013	Best Actor	Dallas Buyers Club	Won	
Austin Film Critics Association	2012	Special Honorary Award	Bernie, Killer Joe, Magic Mike, The Paperboy	Won	
Blockbuster Entertainment Awards	1998	Favorite Actor – Drama	Contact	Nominated	
Blockbuster Entertainment Awards	2001	Favorite Actor – Action	U-571	Nominated	
Boston Society of Film Critics	2013	Best Cast	The Wolf of Wall Street	Runner-up	
Chicago Film Critics Association	1997	Most Promising Actor	A Time to Kill	Nominated	
Chicago Film Critics Association	2013	Best Actor	Dallas Buyers Club	Nominated	
Crime Thriller Awards	2014	The Best Actor Dagger	True Detective	Won	
Critics' Choice Movie Awards	2013	Best Supporting Actor	Magic Mike	Nominated	
Critics' Choice Movie Awards	2014	Best Actor	Dallas Buyers Club	Won	
Critics' Choice Movie Awards	2014	Best Acting Ensemble	The Wolf of Wall Street	Nominated	
Critics' Choice Television Awards	2014	Best Actor in a Drama Series	True Detective	Won	
Dallas–Fort Worth Film Critics Association	2013	Best Actor	Dallas Buyers Club	Won	
Detroit Film Critics Society	2012	Best Supporting Actor	Magic Mike	Nominated	
Detroit Film Critics Society	2013	Best Supporting Actor	Mud	Nominated	
Detroit Film Critics Society	2013	Best Actor	Dallas Buyers Club	Won	
Detroit Film Critics Society	2013	Best Ensemble	The Wolf of Wall Street	Nominated	
Dorian Awards	2014	Film Performance of the Year – Actor	Dallas Buyers Club	Won	
Dorian Awards	2015	TV Performance of the Year - Actor	True Detective	Nominated	
Dublin Film Critics' Circle	2012	Best Actor	Killer Joe	5th place (Note: Tied with Michael Fassbender for the movie Shame)	
Dublin Film Critics' Circle	2013	Best Actor	Mud	6th place	
Fangoria Chainsaw Awards	2015	Best TV Actor	True Detective	Won	
Film Independent Spirit Awards	2013	Best Supporting Male	Magic Mike	Won	
Film Independent Spirit Awards	2013	Best Male Lead	Killer Joe	Nominated	
Film Independent Spirit Awards	2014	Best Male Lead	Dallas Buyers Club	Won	
Film Independent Spirit Awards	2014	Robert Altman Award	Mud	Won	
Florida Film Critics Circle	2003	Best Cast	Thirteen Conversations About One Thing	Won	
Goldene Kamera Awards	2013	Best International Actor	Dallas Buyers Club	Won	
Golden Globe Awards	2014	Best Actor – Motion Picture Drama	Dallas Buyers Club	Won	
Golden Globe Awards	2015	Best Actor – Miniseries or Television Film	True Detective	Nominated	
Golden Raspberry Awards	2019	Worst Actor	Serenity	Nominated	
Georgia Film Critics Association	2013	Best Actor	Dallas Buyers Club	Nominated	
Georgia Film Critics Association	2013	Best Ensemble	The Wolf of Wall Street	Nominated	
Gotham Awards	2012	Best Ensemble Cast	Bernie	Nominated	
Gotham Awards	2013	Best Actor	Dallas Buyers Club	Won	
Hollywood Film Awards	2013	Best Actor	Dallas Buyers Club	Won	
Hollywood Film Awards	2016	Ensemble of the Year	Gold	Won	
Houston Film Critics Society	2013 (Note: The 6th Houston Film Critics Society Awards (awarding movies made in 2012) were handed out in a ceremony that took place on January 5, 2013.)	Best Supporting Actor	Magic Mike	Nominated	
Houston Film Critics Society	2013 (Note: The 7th Houston Film Critics Society Awards (awarding movies made in 2013) were handed out in a ceremony that took place on December 8, 2013.)	Best Supporting Actor	Mud	Nominated	
Houston Film Critics Society	2013	Best Actor	Dallas Buyers Club	Nominated	
Irish Film & Television Academy	2014	Best International Actor	Dallas Buyers Club	Nominated	
MTV Movie Awards	1997	Best Breakthrough Performance	A Time to Kill	Won	
MTV Movie Awards	2014	Best On-Screen Transformation	Dallas Buyers Club	Nominated	
MTV Movie Awards	2014	Best Male Performance	Dallas Buyers Club	Nominated	
MTV Movie Awards	2014	Best On-Screen Duo (shared with Jared Leto)	Dallas Buyers Club	Nominated	
National Society of Film Critics	2013	Best Supporting Actor	Bernie, Magic Mike	Won	
New York Film Critics Circle	2013	Best Supporting Actor	Bernie, Magic Mike	Won	
Online Film Critics Society	2013	Best Supporting Actor	Mud	Nominated	
Palm Springs International Film Festival	2014	Desert Palm Achievement Award	Dallas Buyers Club	Won	
People's Choice Awards	2006	Favorite Male Action Star	Sahara	Won	
Primetime Emmy Awards	2014	Outstanding Lead Actor in a Drama Series	True Detective	Nominated	
Primetime Emmy Awards	2014	Outstanding Drama Series (Note: As executive producer)	True Detective	Nominated	
Primetime Emmy Awards	2024	Outstanding Limited or Anthology Series	True Detective	Nominated	
Producers Guild of America Award	2015	Best Episodic Drama	True Detective	Nominated	
Rome Film Festival	2013	Best Actor	Dallas Buyers Club	Won	
Russian National Movie Awards	2015	Foreign Actor of the Year	Dallas Buyers Club, Interstellar, The Wolf of Wall Street, True Detective	Won	
Russian National Movie Awards	2015	Foreign Hero of the Year	Interstellar	Nominated	
San Diego Film Critics Society	2012	Best Supporting Actor	Killer Joe	Nominated	
San Diego Film Critics Society	2013	Best Actor	Dallas Buyers Club	Nominated	
San Francisco Film Critics Circle	2013	Best Actor	Dallas Buyers Club	Nominated	
Sant Jordi Awards	2014	Best Foreign Actor	Mud	Won	
Satellite Awards	2014	Best Actor – Motion Picture	Dallas Buyers Club	Won	
Saturn Awards	2013	Best Actor	Killer Joe	Won	
Saturn Awards	2015	Best Actor	Interstellar	Nominated	
Saturn Awards	2017	Best Actor	Gold	Nominated	
Screen Actors Guild Awards	2014	Outstanding Performance by a Male Actor in a Leading Role	Dallas Buyers Club	Won	
Screen Actors Guild Awards	2014	Outstanding Performance by a Cast in a Motion Picture	Dallas Buyers Club	Nominated	
Screen Actors Guild Awards	2015	Outstanding Performance by a Male Actor in a Drama Series	True Detective	Nominated	
St. Louis Gateway Film Critics Association	2013	Best Actor	Dallas Buyers Club	Runner-up	
TCA Awards	2014	Individual Achievement in Drama	True Detective	Won	
Teen Choice Awards	2001	Choice Movie Chemistry (shared with Jennifer Lopez)	The Wedding Planner	Nominated	
Teen Choice Awards	2003	Choice Movie Liplock (shared with Kate Hudson)	How to Lose a Guy in 10 Days	Nominated	
Teen Choice Awards	2003	Choice Movie Liar	How to Lose a Guy in 10 Days	Nominated	
Teen Choice Awards	2005	Choice Movie Liplock (shared with Penélope Cruz)	Sahara	Nominated	
Teen Choice Awards	2005	Choice Movie Actor: Action/Thriller	Sahara	Nominated	
Toronto Film Critics Association	2013	Best Actor	Dallas Buyers Club	Runner-up	
Vancouver Film Critics Circle	2014	Best Actor	Dallas Buyers Club	Nominated	
Village Voice Film Poll	2012	Best Supporting Actor	Bernie	9th place	
Village Voice Film Poll	2012	Best Supporting Actor	Killer Joe	5th place	
Village Voice Film Poll	2012	Best Supporting Actor	Magic Mike	Won	
Village Voice Film Poll	2012	Best Actor	Killer Joe	7th place	
Village Voice Film Poll	2013	Best Actor	Dallas Buyers Club	8th place	
Washington D.C. Area Film Critics Association	2013	Best Actor	Dallas Buyers Club	Nominated	
Women Film Critics Circle	2016	Best Actor	Free State of Jones	Nominated	

== Other honors ==
Year	Award	Ref.
2006	Texas Film Hall of Fame	
2014	American Cinematheque Award	
2014	Texas Exes Distinguished Alumni Award	
2015	New Orleans Film Society Celluloid Hero Award	
