= John B. Connally Unit =

Prison in Texas, US

- Location in Texas
- Location: 899 FM 632 Kenedy, Texas postal address 78119; 28°46′30″N 97°50′04″W
- Security class: G1-G5, Administrative Segregation
- Capacity: 2,232
- Opened: July 1995
- Managed by: TDCJ Correctional Institutions Division
- Warden: Phonso Rayford
- Website: www.tdcj.state.tx.us/unit_directory../cy.html

The John B. Connally Unit is a maximum-security prison for males located in unincorporated Karnes County, Texas, United States. It is located on Farm to Market Road 632, just east of U.S. Highway 181 2 miles (3.2 km) south of the city of Kenedy, and southeast of San Antonio. The prison, with about 813 acres (329 ha) of space, is operated by the Correctional Institutions Division of the Texas Department of Criminal Justice, administered as within Region IV. The unit is named for former governor and United States treasury secretary John B. Connally, Jr.

== History ==
The prison opened in July 1995. On December 13, 2000, the prison became infamous after seven inmates staged an elaborate breakout that was successful; this group later became known as the Texas Seven. During the subsequent crime spree, the seven fugitives killed a police officer in Irving. Six of the inmates were later recaptured in January 2001, while the seventh committed suicide before being captured; the six who were recaptured were sentenced to death.

== Notable inmates ==
- The Texas Seven, who escaped in December 2000, and caused the death of Irving police officer Aubrey Hawkins during a robbery. One of them committed suicide while on the run; the others were recaptured, tried, and convicted of the Hawkins murder, all being sentenced to death. As of December 2018, the two surviving members of the seven are incarcerated in the Allan B. Polunsky Unit.
  - Joseph C. Garcia (executed December 4, 2018)
  - Randy Ethan Halprin
  - Larry James Harper (committed suicide while on the run)
  - Patrick Henry Murphy, Jr.
  - Donald Keith Newbury (executed February 2, 2015)
  - George Rivas (ringleader, executed February 29, 2012)
  - Michael Anthony Rodriguez (declined appeals beyond mandatory, executed August 14, 2008)
- Carlton Dotson, former Baylor Bears basketball player who pleaded guilty to the murder of Patrick Dennehy, his teammate
- Bernie Tiede, mortician and convicted murderer who was the subject of the 2011 film Bernie
- Raymond Ayala, Houston, Texas rapper better known as “Lil Bing”, convicted murder and rapper
- Dennis Wayne Hope, best known for two daring prison escapes in Texas, subsequent supermarket robberies while on the run, and later spending 27 years in solitary confinement
- Earl David Worden, first amendment auditor who was convicted of sexual assault of a child in 2022.
- Taymor Travon McIntyre, better known by his stage name "Tay-K", convicted murderer and rapper
- Francisco Oropeza, perpetrator of the 2023 Cleveland, Texas shooting.
