= Critics' Choice Movie Award for Best Actor in a Comedy =

Award given by the Broadcast Film Critics Association

- Awarded for: Best Performance by an Actor in a Leading Role in a Comedy
- Location: Los Angeles, California
- Presented by: Broadcast Film Critics Association
- First award: Bradley Cooper for Silver Linings Playbook (2012)
- Final award: Christian Bale for Vice (2018)
- Website: www.criticschoice.com

The Critics' Choice Movie Award for Best Actor in a Comedy was one of the awards given to people working in the motion picture industry by the Broadcast Film Critics Association (BFCA) at their annual Critics' Choice Movie Awards. The award was discontinued after 2018.

== Winners and nominees ==
=== 2010s ===
Year	Actor	Character	Film	Ref.
2012	Bradley Cooper	Patrizio "Pat" Solitano Jr.	Silver Linings Playbook	
2012	Jack Black	Bernie Tiede	Bernie	
2012	Paul Rudd	Pete	This Is 40	
2012	Channing Tatum	Greg Jenko / Brad McQuaid	21 Jump Street	
2012	Mark Wahlberg	John Bennett	Ted	
2013	Leonardo DiCaprio	Jordan Belfort	The Wolf of Wall Street	
2013	Christian Bale	Irving Rosenfeld	American Hustle	
2013	James Gandolfini	Albert	Enough Said	
2013	Simon Pegg	Gary King	The World's End	
2013	Sam Rockwell	Owen	The Way, Way Back	
2014	Michael Keaton	Riggan Thomson	Birdman	
2014	Jon Favreau	Carl Casper	Chef	
2014	Ralph Fiennes	Monsieur Gustave H.	The Grand Budapest Hotel	
2014	Bill Murray	Vincent MacKenna	St. Vincent	
2014	Chris Rock	Andre Allen	Top Five	
2014	Channing Tatum	Greg Jenko	22 Jump Street	
2015	Christian Bale	Michael Burry	The Big Short	
2015	Steve Carell	Mark Baum	The Big Short	
2015	Robert De Niro	Ben Whitaker	The Intern	
2015	Bill Hader	Dr. Aaron Conners	Trainwreck	
2015	Jason Statham	Rick Ford	Spy	
2016	Ryan Reynolds	Wade Wilson / Deadpool	Deadpool	
2016	Ryan Gosling	Holland March	The Nice Guys	
2016	Hugh Grant	St. Clair Bayfield	Florence Foster Jenkins	
2016	Dwayne Johnson	Robbie Wheirdicht / Bob Stone	Central Intelligence	
2016	Viggo Mortensen	Ben Cash	Captain Fantastic	
2017	James Franco	Tommy Wiseau	The Disaster Artist	
2017	Steve Carell	Bobby Riggs	Battle of the Sexes	
2017	Chris Hemsworth	Thor Odinson	Thor: Ragnarok	
2017	Kumail Nanjiani	Kumail Nanjiani	The Big Sick	
2017	Adam Sandler	Danny Meyerowitz	The Meyerowitz Stories	
2018	Christian Bale	Dick Cheney	Vice	
2018	Jason Bateman	Max Davis	Game Night	
2018	Viggo Mortensen	Frank "Tony Lip" Vallelonga	Green Book	
2018	John C. Reilly	Oliver Hardy	Stan & Ollie	
2018	Ryan Reynolds	Wade Wilson / Deadpool	Deadpool 2	
2018	Lakeith Stanfield	Cassius "Cash" Green	Sorry to Bother You	

== Superlatives ==
=== Multiple wins ===
Wins	Actor
2	Christian Bale

=== Multiple nominations ===
Nominations	Actor
3	Christian Bale
2	Steve Carell
2	Viggo Mortensen
2	Ryan Reynolds
2	Channing Tatum
