= Fast Mail (Milwaukee Road train) =

Overview
- Service type: intercity mail and express, and coach service
- Status: discontinued
- Locale: Midwestern United States
- First service: March 13, 1884
- Last service: May 1, 1971
- Former operator: Milwaukee Road

Route
- Termini: Minneapolis, Minnesota; Chicago, Illinois
- Train numbers: 55 and 57 northbound 56 and 58 southbound

Technical
- Track gauge: 4 ft 8 1/2 in (1,435 mm)

The Fast Mail was a train service operated by the Chicago, Milwaukee, St. Paul and Pacific Railroad (the "Milwaukee Road") on an overnight schedule between Chicago, Illinois, and Minneapolis, Minnesota. The southbound trains (to Chicago) were Milwaukee Road train Nos. 56 and 58, and the northbound trains (to Minneapolis) were train Nos. 55 and 57. In its early years, this train service helped earn the Milwaukee Road's line the nickname "The Fast Mail Line." In 1924, the Fast Mail was the target of the largest train robbery in U.S. history. The Fast Mail was discontinued with train 56's arrival in Chicago on May 1, 1971.

== History and operation ==
The service, developed as part of a nationwide "fast-mail" system, was inaugurated on March 13, 1884, with a special run departing northward from Chicago at 3:04 a.m. (four minutes late owing to a late arrival in Chicago by the connecting fast mail train from New York), arriving in Minneapolis at 3:50 p.m. the same day. For the first run, the train carried dignitaries from the Railway Mail Service, the Milwaukee Road and a few express agencies. Two trains served the route for its first decade. In 1899, the Post Office Department put forth a plan to reduce the travel time across the country, so the Milwaukee added two more trains, reducing travel time for mail between New York and Washington states from 122 hours to 95 hours.

Through its history, late departures from Chicago were not entirely unknown as the connecting trains were occasionally late and Milwaukee Road held its train for the connection. Likewise, if the Milwaukee Road's trains were late arriving in St. Paul, the connecting Great Northern Railway trains would also leave late to keep the connection. But the timetable was designed such that a passenger departing Chicago in the evening could arrive in St. Paul the next morning with mail waiting for him that was added to the Fast Mail after the passenger left Chicago. All other Milwaukee Road trains were required to clear the line ahead of the Fast Mail's arrival so it could keep its high speed schedule.

The four trains were operated primarily for the haulage of mail and express freight. In addition to sorting mail en route for the stations it served, the Fast Mail carried through mail bags bound for destinations further west; these were transferred at St. Paul to other connecting trains. For most of the train's history, only the southbound run carried paying passengers. In 1901, the train played a part in Charles Cecil Fitzmorris's record-setting journey around the world; the train on which he was carried was allowed to exceed the timetable speed to arrive in Chicago one hour early.

In 1906, passenger service on train 58 was discontinued to comply with a demand from the Post Office Department for faster train speeds; the passenger services from that train were moved to a new train (number 16) serving stations between Minneapolis and La Crosse. A coach was added to train 56 in 1915 with scheduled stops in West Salem, Bangor, and Sparta. Train lengths averaged between 15 and 24 cars daily, and would often grow to 32 cars per train as needed.

The Fast Mail was discontinued with the advent of Amtrak, and the final run of train 56 arrived in Chicago on May 1, 1971.

== Incidents ==
One of the mail cars attached to the train in 1911 caught fire near Pewaukee, destroying about 50 bags of mail and newspapers. The cause of the fire was not known.

On June 12, 1924, the Fast Mail was stopped and robbed by the Newton Gang at Rondout, Illinois, in what has been called the biggest train robbery in U.S. history. About $3 million in cash and bonds was stolen, between $75,000 and $100,000 of which was never recovered. One of the alleged perpetrators was found shot in his Tulsa, Oklahoma, home in 1949. The robbery was depicted in the 1998 film based on the story of the perpetrators, "The Newton Boys."

On August 12, 1927, the train was derailed and wrecked when it hit an open switch near Sturtevant. Two trainmen died in the incident in which it was determined that another railroad employee had misaligned the switch.

In 1938, five men were convicted for their involvement in a string of robberies on board the train while it was operating. Four of the men were Milwaukee Road employees, primarily brakemen, the fifth was a Railway Express Agency employee. Although they were suspected of being involved in many robberies, the conviction covered only one. The judge in the case offered some leniency based on the perpetrators' otherwise clean records.
