= 2012 National Society of Film Critics Awards =

Annual US film awards ceremony

The 47th National Society of Film Critics Awards, given on 5 January 2013, honored the best in film for 2012.

47th NSFC Awards

January 5, 2013

Best Film:
Amour

== Winners ==
Film titles are listed in order of placings:

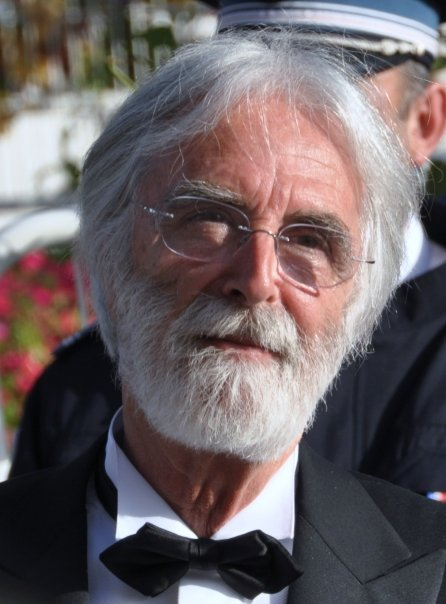
Michael Haneke, Best Director winner

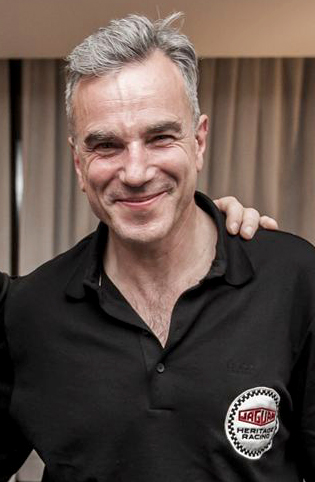
Daniel Day-Lewis, Best Actor winner

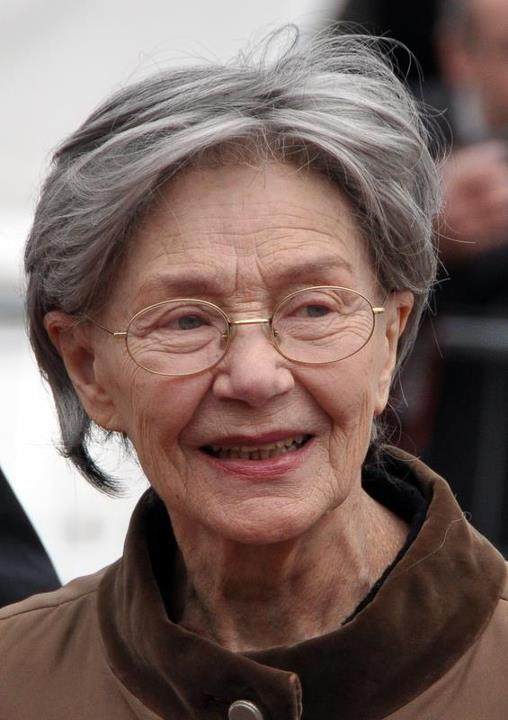
Emmanuelle Riva, Best Actress winner

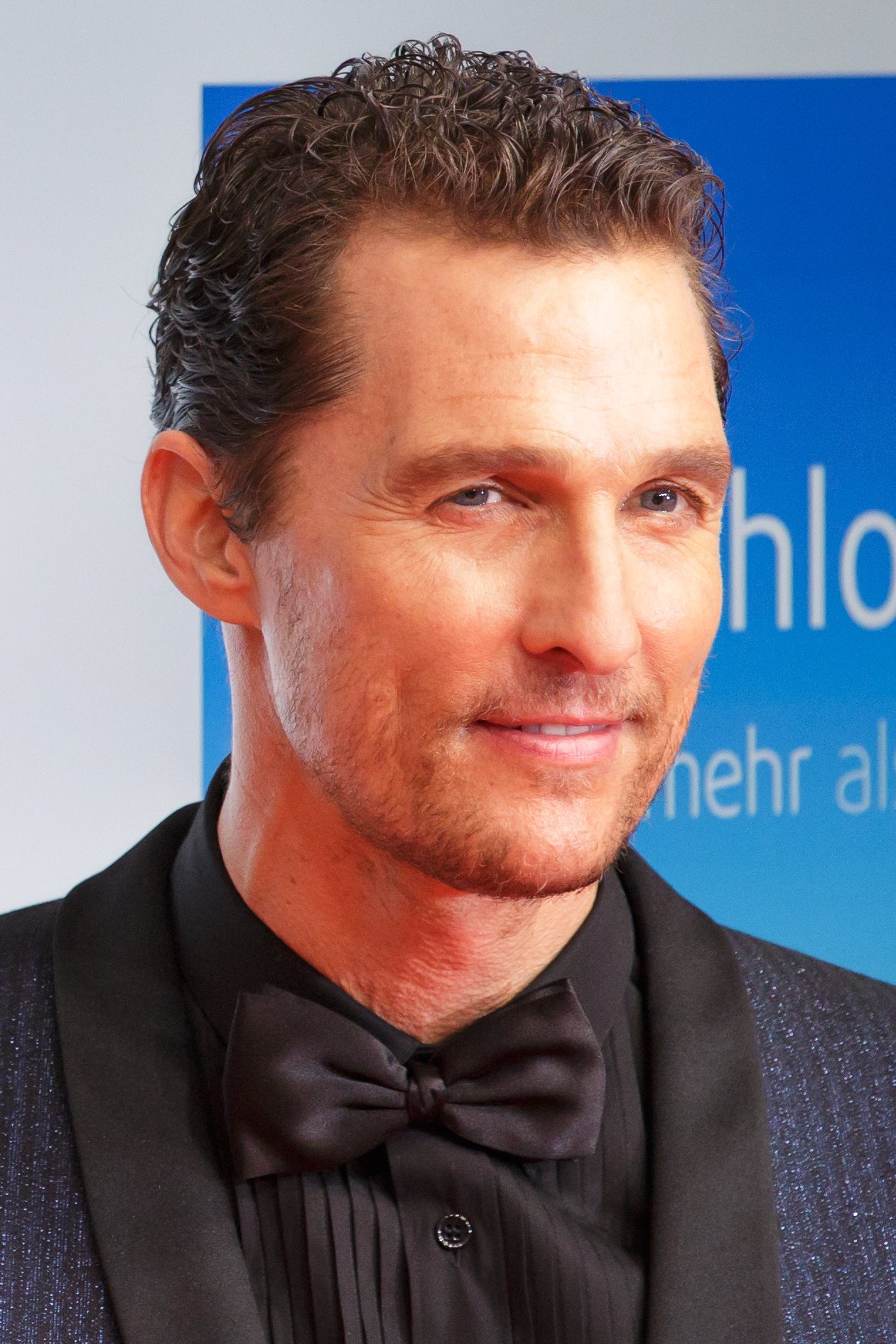
Matthew McConaughey, Best Supporting Actor winner

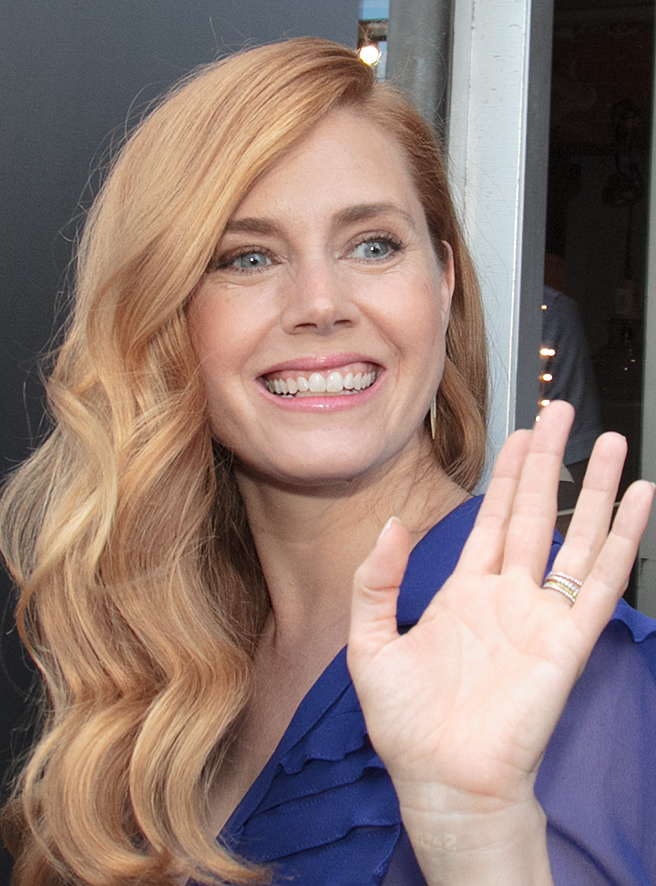
Amy Adams, Best Supporting Actress winner

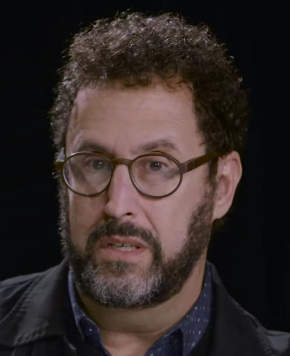
Tony Kushner, Best Screenplay winner

=== Best Picture ===
1. Amour
2. The Master
3. Zero Dark Thirty

=== Best Director ===
1. Michael Haneke – Amour
2. Kathryn Bigelow – Zero Dark Thirty
2. Paul Thomas Anderson – The Master

=== Best Actor ===
1. Daniel Day-Lewis – Lincoln
2. Denis Lavant – Holy Motors
2. Joaquin Phoenix – The Master

=== Best Actress ===
1. Emmanuelle Riva – Amour
2. Jennifer Lawrence – Silver Linings Playbook
3. Jessica Chastain – Zero Dark Thirty

=== Best Supporting Actor ===
1. Matthew McConaughey – Bernie and Magic Mike
2. Tommy Lee Jones – Lincoln
3. Philip Seymour Hoffman – The Master

=== Best Supporting Actress ===
1. Amy Adams – The Master
2. Sally Field – Lincoln
3. Anne Hathaway – Les Misérables

=== Best Screenplay ===
1. Tony Kushner – Lincoln
2. Paul Thomas Anderson – The Master
3. David O. Russell – Silver Linings Playbook

=== Best Cinematography ===
1. Mihai Mălaimare Jr. – The Master
2. Roger Deakins – Skyfall
3. Greig Fraser – Zero Dark Thirty

=== Best Non-Fiction Film ===
1. The Gatekeepers
2. This Is Not a Film
3. Searching for Sugar Man

=== Best Experimental Film ===
This Is Not a Film

=== Film Heritage Awards ===
1. Laurence Kardish, senior film curator at the Museum of Modern Art, for his extraordinary 44 years of service, including this year's Weimar Cinema retrospective.
2. Milestone Film and Video for its ongoing "Project Shirley".
