= 2012 New York Film Critics Circle Awards =

78th New York Film Critics Circle Awards

78th NYFCC Awards

January 7, 2013

Best Picture:
Zero Dark Thirty

The 78th New York Film Critics Circle Awards, honoring the best in film for 2012, were announced on 3 December 2012 and presented on 7 January 2013.

== Winners ==
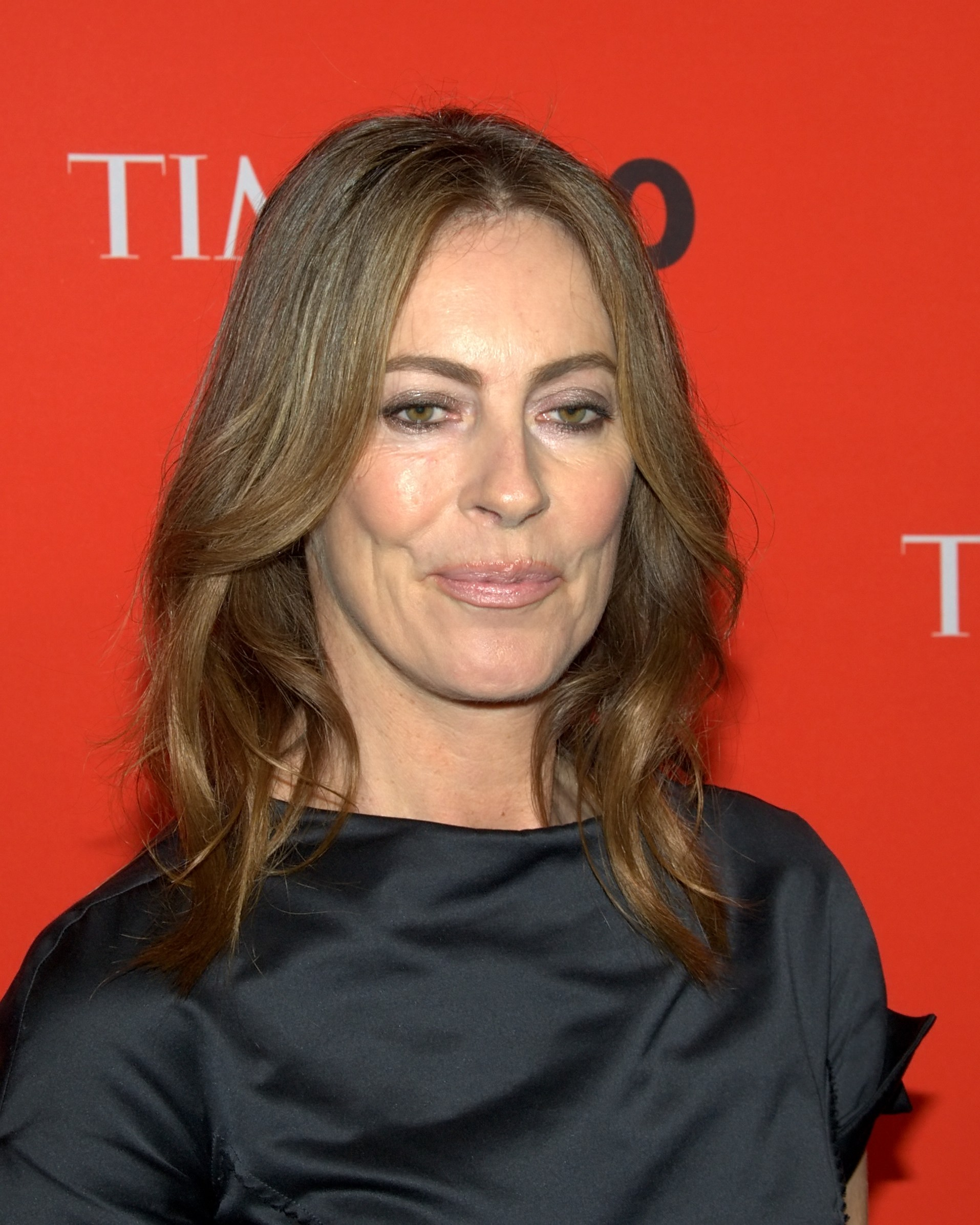
Kathryn Bigelow, Best Director winner

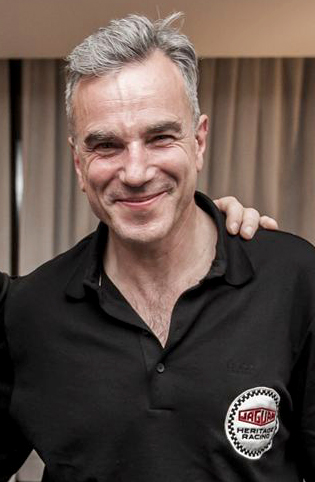
Daniel Day-Lewis, Best Actor winner

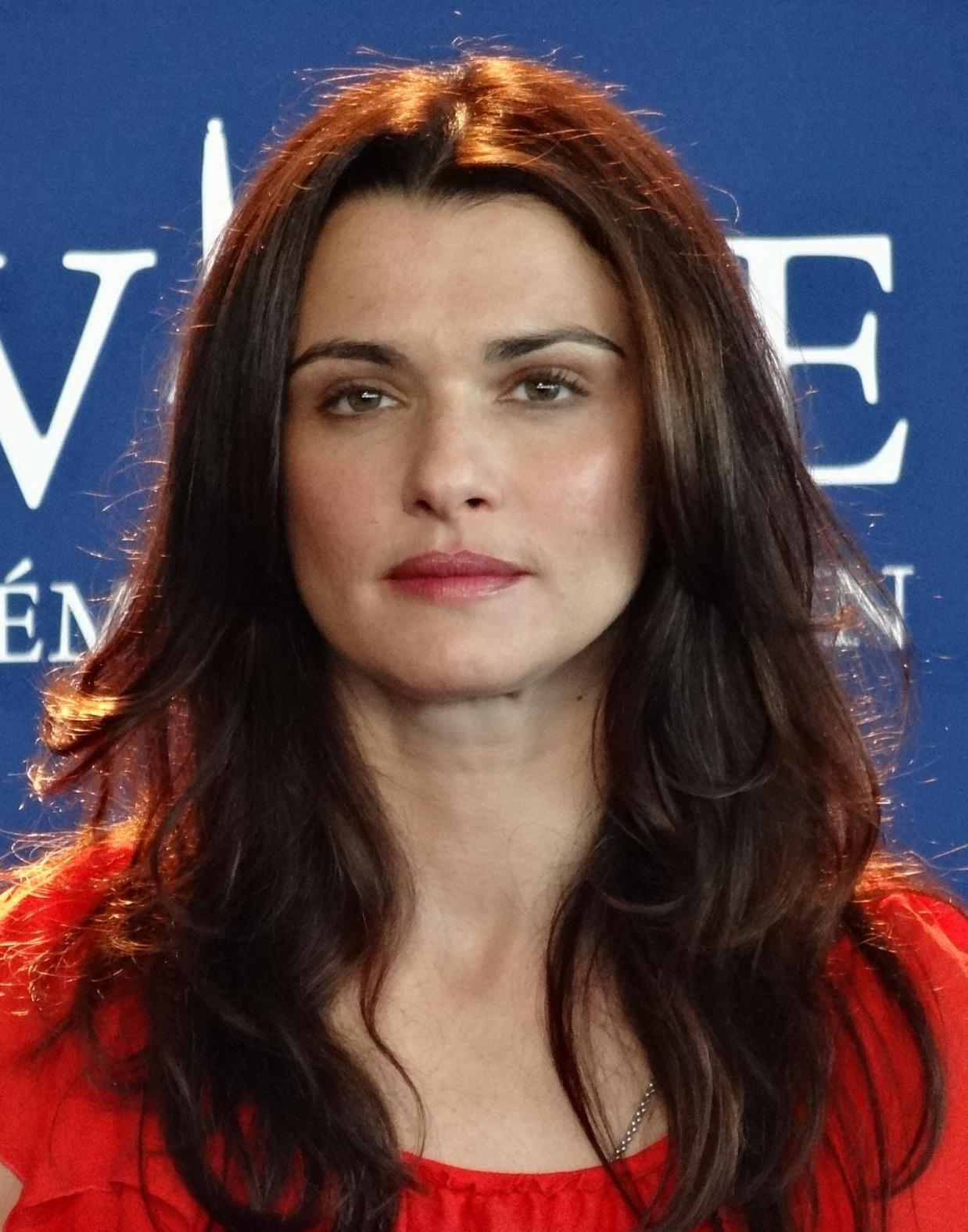
Rachel Weisz, Best Actress winner

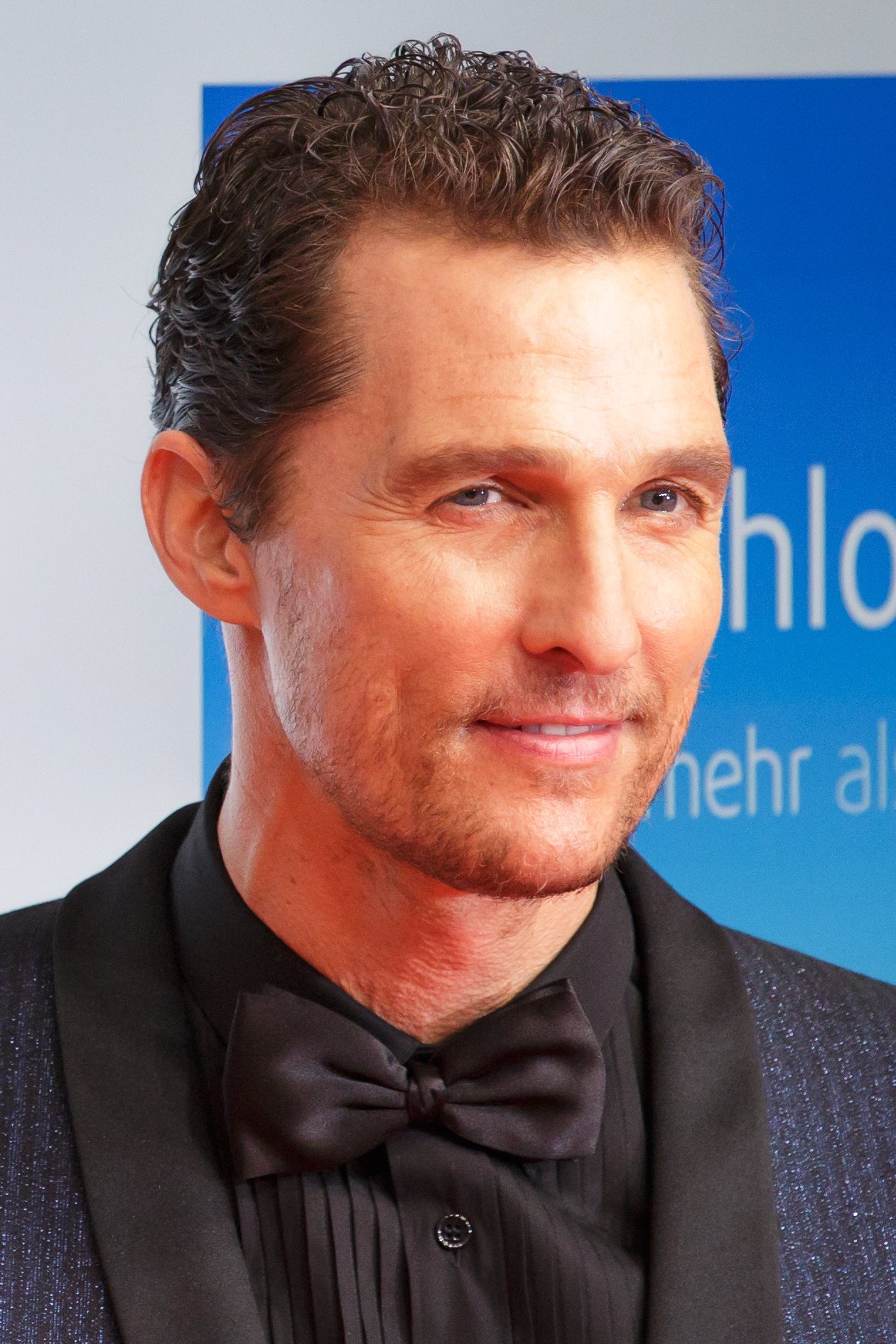
Matthew McConaughey, Best Supporting Actor winner

Sally Field, Best Supporting Actress winner

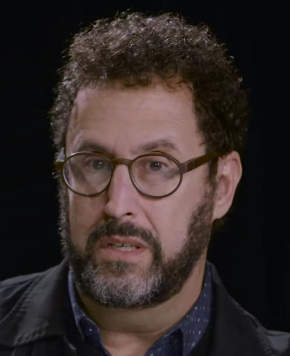
Tony Kushner, Best Screenplay winner

- Best Film:
  - Zero Dark Thirty
  - Runners-up: Argo and The Master
- Best Director:
  - Kathryn Bigelow – Zero Dark Thirty
  - Runners-up: Ben Affleck – Argo and Paul Thomas Anderson – The Master
- Best Actor:
  - Daniel Day-Lewis – Lincoln
  - Runners-up: Jack Black – Bernie, Denis Lavant – Holy Motors, and Joaquin Phoenix – The Master
- Best Actress:
  - Rachel Weisz – The Deep Blue Sea
  - Runners-up: Jessica Chastain – Zero Dark Thirty, Jennifer Lawrence – The Hunger Games and Silver Linings Playbook, and Emmanuelle Riva – Amour
- Best Supporting Actor:
  - Matthew McConaughey – Bernie and Magic Mike
  - Runners-up: Tommy Lee Jones – Lincoln and Christoph Waltz – Django Unchained
- Best Supporting Actress:
  - Sally Field – Lincoln
  - Runner-up: Anne Hathaway – The Dark Knight Rises and Les Misérables
- Best Screenplay:
  - Tony Kushner – Lincoln
  - Runners-up: Wes Anderson and Roman Coppola – Moonrise Kingdom and Mark Boal – Zero Dark Thirty
- Best Animated Film:
  - Frankenweenie
  - Runners-up: Brave and ParaNorman
- Best Cinematography:
  - Greig Fraser – Zero Dark Thirty
  - Runner-up: Mihai Mălaimare Jr. – The Master
- Best Foreign Language Film:
  - Amour • Austria / France / Germany
  - Runners-up: Holy Motors • France / Germany and Once Upon a Time in Anatolia (Bir Zamanlar Anadolu'da) • Bosnia and Herzegovina / Turkey
- Best Non-Fiction Film:
  - The Central Park Five
  - Runners-up: The Gatekeepers and This Is Not a Film
- Best First Film:
  - David France – How to Survive a Plague
  - Runner-up: Benh Zeitlin – Beasts of the Southern Wild
