= Robert Ladd =

Robert Ladd may refer to:

- Robert Ladd (linguist) (born 1947), linguist and academic
- Robert Charles Ladd (1957–2015), American serial killer
- Robert Ladd (born 1959), American police officer in Compton, see Timothy M. Brennan and Robert Ladd
- Robert Ladd (naval architect), designer of the Swedish sailboat Nimbus 42
