= Bernie Tiede =

American mortician (born 1958)

- Born: Bernhardt Tiede; August 2, 1958 (age 68); Tyler, Texas, U.S.
- Occupation: Assistant funeral director
- Parent(s): Bernhardt Tiede and Lela Mae Jester
- Status: Incarcerated at the John B. Connally Unit
- Conviction: First-degree murder
- Penalty: 99 years to life

Bernhardt Tiede II (/ˈtiːd/; born August 2, 1958) is an American mortician who was convicted of the November 19, 1996 murder of his companion, wealthy 81-year-old widow Marjorie "Marge" Nugent, in Carthage, Texas. He was 38 at the time of the murder.

These events are the subject of the critically acclaimed film Bernie (2011), a dark comedy directed by Richard Linklater and starring Jack Black as Tiede. The film attracted attention to Tiede's case, and new evidence was discovered. He was temporarily released on bail in 2014, pending a resentencing hearing. Despite the new evidence, Tiede was sentenced to 99 years to life.

His case is also featured on the Season 3, Episode 7, titled "Millionairess Mortician", from the show Deadly Sins.

== Family and early life ==
Bernie Tiede is the son of Bernhardt Tiede, a native of Olegnow, Volyn Oblast, Ukraine. Of German descent, Tiede had immigrated in 1926 as a child with his family to the United States. The elder Tiede had served as a professor of music and choral director at Our Lady of the Lake College in San Antonio, Texas (1946–1948), at Southern Methodist University (SMU) in Dallas (1948–1957), at Kilgore College in Kilgore (1957–1968), and then McMurry College in Abilene, where he served as director of the McMurry Chanters until his death. In addition to his work as a university professor, the elder Tiede also served as church music director and as a vocal performer. Bernie Tiede's mother was his father's first wife, Lela Mae Jester (1933–1960). They married in 1957, and Bernie was born the next year in Tyler. Jester was killed in an automobile accident when Bernie was two years old. Tiede’s father, who was driving the car in which Jester died, never forgave himself, and started drinking frequently.

His father died in Abilene when Tiede was fifteen. Tiede graduated from Cooper High School in 1976. He became a mortician, working in Carthage as assistant director of the Hawthorn Funeral Home. He was very popular in the town.

== Marjorie Nugent ==
Tiede met the wealthy widow, Marjorie Nugent, in March 1990 at her husband's funeral, which Tiede had helped arrange as assistant director at Hawthorn Funeral Home. The two eventually became inseparable companions, although she was more than 40 years his senior. In 1991, Nugent altered her will, and disinherited her only child, Rod Nugent, leaving her entire $10 million estate to Tiede. By 1993, Bernie left his job to work for Nugent full time as her business manager and travel companion.

In November 1996, Tiede killed Nugent by shooting her in the back four times with a .22 caliber rifle. He placed her body in a freezer used to store food at her Carthage home. According to the Amarillo Globe-News, Nugent's estranged son, Rod, an Amarillo pathologist, had grown concerned about not being able to reach his mother. After traveling to Panola County nine months following her death, Rod declared Nugent a missing person. He and his daughter entered his mother's house, where they found her body in the freezer.

Tiede was taken in for questioning, and he admitted to Nugent's murder to police in August 1997. He said that after the murder, he had prepared the body, and placed it in a freezer. After this, Tiede acknowledged using Nugent's money for civic activities, gifts to academic and civic groups, and to friends. She had given him power of attorney over her funds. A jury convicted Tiede of first-degree murder, and sentenced him to 50 years in prison. When he appealed his sentence, the appellate courts ruled that there was sufficient evidence for the jury to have found premeditation, a condition of the charge.

After the film Bernie (2011) was released, attorney Jodi Cole became interested in Tiede's case and met with him, filing a post-conviction writ of habeas corpus, in which Tiede alleged that his constitutional rights were violated in the first trial because of newly discovered evidence. He further alleged in the writ that the 81-year-old Nugent was controlling and emotionally abusive toward him, and that he had murdered her in a dissociative state resulting from years of sexual abuse as a child by an uncle. The Texas Criminal Courts of Appeal approved the writ. According to Rod, Tiede had alienated Nugent from her family, friends, and business associates of her late husband. He told the Globe-News: “It appears this Bernie Tiede kind of systematically estranged my mother from all these people one at a time ... At some point, they became angry with my mother.”

When interviewed, Panola County District Attorney Danny Buck Davidson said that the town of Carthage was “split up” in regards to their opinion of Tiede. Davidson recounted to the Longview News-Journal, “People remember [Tiede] as being real nice and doing nice things, and they'd like my office to go real easy on him. And then, there's a group that wants no mercy.”

At the resentencing trial, Tiede was sentenced to life in prison. Rod filed a wrongful death lawsuit against Tiede, claiming he had embezzled more than $3 million from his mother.

== Imprisonment and release ==
Shortly after entering the Texas Department of Criminal Justice in 1999, Tiede was attacked by fellow inmates. During his imprisonment, he was described by a prison official as “a model-prisoner”. He taught health classes and participated in the prison's choir. Until May 2014, he was serving a life sentence.

In May 2014, Davidson and a visiting Judge Diane DeVasto of Tyler allowed Tiede to be released from prison that month on $10,000 bail, after his attorney, Jodi Cole, had learned that Tiede had been sexually abused as a child for multiple years by an uncle. Cole theorized that Tiede shot Nugent while in a brief dissociative episode brought on by her abusive treatment of him, a theory backed by forensic psychiatrist Richard Pesikoff.

Mr. Tiede’s ability to repress and compartmentalize the abusive events from childhood and adolescence was ultimately overwhelmed by the repeated and extensive psychological abuse he suffered from Mrs. Nugent. The end result, his loss of control over his emotions and behavior, is evidenced in his final actions toward Mrs. Nugent.

— Richard Pesikoff

It has also been suggested that Tiede's handwritten confession (a major factor in the murder being considered first-degree) was strongly influenced by the prosecution's threats of leaking private videotapes of Tiede. When presented with the new evidence, Davidson agreed that, had he known this information in the original trial, he would have sought a lighter sentence.

Nugent's family learned about Tiede's release through media reports. Her granddaughter expressed shock that the release was granted, and claimed that Richard Linklater's 2011 film Bernie had influenced the legal system. The Nugent family created a website to honor Nugent's memory, posting photos of her and articles relating to her murder.

Between the time of his release in 2014 and his resentencing hearing in April 2016, Tiede resided in Austin, Texas, at the garage apartment of filmmaker Richard Linklater, who had offered to assist him; this was a condition of his release.

== Resentencing hearing ==
The resentencing trial began on April 6, 2016. Tiede was represented by Mike DeGeurin. Lisa Tanner, Assistant Attorney General of Texas, was the lead counsel for The State of Texas. During the resentencing trial, Marjorie's granddaughter, Shanna Nugent, spoke directly to Bernie, and stated, “You are nothing to me”. Shanna and her father, Rod Nugent, both asserted that Marjorie was a kind woman on good terms with her family (in contrast to the portrayal in the film), whom Tiede conned in order to spend her fortune without her knowledge.

Other witnesses' testimonies differed. For instance, Gregg County Commissioner Darryl Primo testified that in a conversation he had with Marjorie between 1991 and 1996, she spoke favorably of Bernie's spending, as she proclaimed, “I’ll spend every dime [of my money] before I leave it to my family”. Merrell Rhodes, the victim's sister, recalled of Marjorie, “I was always afraid of her... I never forgot that she was my sister... I always loved her as a sister, actually, even when she did ugly things, and she did”. Merrel's son, Joe Rhodes, attested to the movie's accurate portrayal of his aunt. He noted several acts of his aunt's abusive behavior toward him in The New York Times article titled “How my Aunt Marge ended up in the deep Freeze”.

On April 22, 2016, the jury of ten women and two men issued a new sentence of 99 years to life for Tiede. After three weeks of testimony, they had deliberated for just over four hours.

== Appeal and incarceration status ==
A week after his resentencing, his lawyers filed an appeal to the court's decision. In June 2016, the 1997 theft charge against Tiede was dropped. In August 2017, a Texas appeals court upheld the 99-year prison sentence.

Tiede was the subject of the 48 Hours episode titled “The Mortician, the Murder, the Movie”, which discussed his crime, as well as his brief re-entry to society and subsequent resentencing.

Tiede resided in the Telford Unit of the Texas Department of Criminal Justice for at least 15 years. As of 2021, Tiede was incarcerated at the John B. Connally Unit of the Texas Department of Criminal Justice in Kenedy, Texas, for several years. He currently resides at the Estelle Unit. He is not eligible for parole until August 3, 2029, which is the day after his 71st birthday. Tiede is currently the lead plaintiff in a lawsuit against the Texas Department of Criminal Justice regarding the lack of air conditioning in its prisons, which the suit estimates kills 14 inmates every year.
