= Newton Gang =

Outlaw gang of the early 20th century

The Newton Gang (ca. 1919 through 1924) was an outlaw gang of the early 20th century, who engaged in train robbery and bank robbery. From 1919 through 1924, the gang robbed dozens of banks, claiming a total of 75 banks and six trains. According to Willis Newton, the brothers "took in more money than the Dalton Gang, Butch Cassidy's Wild Bunch, and the James-Younger Gang combined." According to their own claims, they never killed anyone although reportedly "they did on occasion shoot, pistol whip, and beat their victims".

A 1924 train robbery near Rondout, Illinois, was their most famous crime. In 1975, they participated in a documentary film, and then a more in-depth oral history project. This second round of fame led to a feature film being produced by a major Hollywood studio, after the death of the last surviving brother.

== Formation and outlaw career ==
The Newton brothers came of age in Uvalde County, Texas. In their youth, the boys stole watermelons, cotton bales, clothing, and firearms.

Willis Newton (born in 1889) robbed his first bank at age 25. After more robberies, Willis wrote his brothers and asked them to join him for some work, including two $20 bills in the letter. The gang, including all four Newton brothers and Brent Glasscock, went on to rob a series of trains and banks in 10 states and Canada.

In 1924, the gang committed the biggest rail heist in American history by robbing a mail train near Rondout, Illinois. The gang netted $3 million in cash, jewelry, and negotiable securities, but brother Doc was wounded by one of the gang, which prevented their successful escape. The robbery was planned in part with a corrupt postal inspector.

After the April 6, 1934, murder of Constable Cal Campbell by Clyde Barrow and Henry Methvin in Commerce, Oklahoma, Joe and Willis Newton allowed the Barrow Gang to hide out in a house they owned in Tulsa. The famous fan letter to Henry Ford purportedly from Clyde Barrow was mailed from Tulsa on April 10, 1934; it may have been written at the Newton house. Joe Newton's personal opinion of Bonnie and Clyde was quite low, calling them "two crazy kids that started out stealing cars."

In 1934, both Willis and Joe were sentenced to nearly 10-year sentences in Oklahoma for a bank robbery they claim they did not commit. Doc Newton was again arrested for bank robbery in 1968, in Rowena, Texas. Willis Newton was implicated in another bank robbery in 1973, in the town of Brackettville, Texas, but the evidence was insufficient to arrest him.

== In media ==
Dock's 1968 arrest for bank robbery at age 77 made national news and was later the subject of an article in LIFE on April 19, 1968.

David Middleton and Claude I. Stanush edited the oral history book The Newton Boys; Portrait of an Outlaw Gang, with the participation of Willis and Joe Newton. Extensive audio interviews recorded in 1976 formed the basis of the text. The pair had produced a short documentary film the previous year and wanted to expand on the project.

In November 1980, 79-year-old Joe Newton appeared on The Tonight Show and was interviewed by Johnny Carson.

The 1998 film The Newton Boys, starring Matthew McConaughey, Skeet Ulrich, Ethan Hawke, Vincent D'Onofrio, and Dwight Yoakam was based on the gang.
