= New Orleans Film Society =

US nonprofit organization

The New Orleans Film Society (NOFS) is a nonprofit arts organization located in New Orleans, Louisiana. The organization presents and exhibits year-round film programming and events in addition to the annual New Orleans Film Festival.

The New Orleans Film Society was founded in 1989. The film festival has grown into a major showcase of local, regional, national, and international films. In addition to the annual Festival each autumn, the NOFS hosts special events throughout the year: the French Film Festival, Moonlight Movies, Film-o-Rama, the New Orleans International Children's Film Festival, and other events designed to benefit local film audiences, artists, and professionals. The NOFS also partners with local organizations to present monthly film series—at the Contemporary Arts Center, Chalmette Movies, the New Orleans Museum of Art, and Ashé Cultural Arts Center. Throughout the year, the NOFS reaches approximately 20,000 people through its programming.
