= Matthew McConaughey =

American actor (born 1969)

- McConaughey at the 2025 Toronto International Film Festival
- Born: Matthew David McConaughey; November 4, 1969 (age 57); Uvalde, Texas, U.S.
- Education: University of Texas at Austin (BS)
- Occupation: Actor
- Years active: 1991–present
- Works: Full list
- Spouse: Camila Alves (m. 2012)
- Children: 3
- Awards: Full list

Matthew David McConaughey (/məˈkɒnəheɪ/ mə-KON-ə-hay; born November 4, 1969) is an American actor. He achieved his breakthrough with a supporting performance in the coming-of-age comedy Dazed and Confused (1993). After a number of supporting roles, McConaughey's first success as a leading man came in the legal drama A Time to Kill (1996). His career progressed with lead roles in the science fiction film Contact (1997), the historical drama Amistad (1997), and the war film U-571 (2000).

In the 2000s, McConaughey became known for starring in romantic comedies, including The Wedding Planner (2001), How to Lose a Guy in 10 Days (2003), Failure to Launch (2006), Fool's Gold (2008), and Ghosts of Girlfriends Past (2009), establishing him as a sex symbol. In 2011, after a two-year hiatus from film acting, McConaughey began to appear in more dramatic roles, beginning with the legal drama The Lincoln Lawyer. In 2012, he gained wider praise for his roles as a stripper in Magic Mike and a fugitive in Mud.

McConaughey's portrayal of Ron Woodroof, a cowboy diagnosed with AIDS, in the biopic Dallas Buyers Club (2013) earned him widespread critical acclaim and numerous accolades, including the Academy Award for Best Actor. He followed it with a supporting role in The Wolf of Wall Street (2013), and a starring role as Rust Cohle in the first season of HBO's crime anthology series True Detective (2014), for which he was nominated for the Primetime Emmy Award for Outstanding Lead Actor in a Drama Series. His subsequent film roles include starring in Interstellar (2014) and The Gentlemen (2019), as well as voice work in Kubo and the Two Strings (2016), Sing (2016), and Sing 2 (2021).

== Early life and education ==
Matthew David McConaughey was born on November 4, 1969, in Uvalde, Texas. He has Irish heritage, particularly from the County Cavan/County Monaghan area. His mother, Mary Kathleen (née McCabe), a published author and a former kindergarten teacher, was from Trenton, New Jersey. His father, James Donald McConaughey, also had Irish roots. He was born in Mississippi in 1929 and raised in Louisiana where he ran an oil pipe supply business; he played for the Kentucky Wildcats and the Houston Cougars college football teams. Jim was selected by the Green Bay Packers of the National Football League (NFL) in the 27th round of the 1953 NFL draft. He was released before the season began and never played an official league game in the NFL. McConaughey's parents married each other three times, having divorced each other twice. He has two older brothers, Michael and Patrick (who was adopted). Michael, nicknamed "Rooster", is a millionaire who starred in the CNBC docu-series West Texas Investors Club. The family were Methodists. He is a relative of Confederate brigadier general Dandridge McRae.

McConaughey moved to Longview, Texas in 1980 and later attended Longview High School. In 1988, he went to Australia thinking he would be attending a high school in Sydney. Instead he lived in Warnervale, New South Wales for a year while he went to Gorokan High School (he was a Rotary Youth Exchange student) and worked as an assistant for an attorney and as a bank teller for ANZ. During this time in Australia and for the next 10 years he seriously considered becoming a monk. A friend of his who was a monk told McConaughey that he was not here to be a monk, that he was meant to be "a communicator" and "a storyteller".

McConaughey attended the University of Texas at Austin (UT-Austin), where he joined the Delta Tau Delta fraternity. He began in the fall of 1989 and graduated in the spring of 1993 with a Bachelor of Science in Radio-Television-Film. His original plan changed as he had wanted to attend Southern Methodist University until one of his brothers told him that private-school tuition would have been a burden on the family's finances. He had planned to attend law school after graduation from college but discovered he did not have any interest in becoming a lawyer.

== Career ==
=== Early 1990s–2000: Career beginnings ===
In the early 1990s, McConaughey began working in television commercials. In 1992, he was cast as the boyfriend in the music video for "Walkaway Joe", a song by Trisha Yearwood featuring Don Henley. Also that year, he acted in an episode of Unsolved Mysteries.

Bob Balaban's My Boyfriend's Back premiered on August 6, 1993, where McConaughey made his first big screen appearance as ''Guy 2''. On September 24, Richard Linklater's Dazed and Confused premiered. McConaughey played Wooderson in a large ensemble cast of actors who would later become stars. He was not originally cast in the film, as the role of Wooderson was originally small and meant to be cast locally for budget purposes. At the time of casting, he was a film student at the University of Texas in Austin and went out with his girlfriend to the Hyatt hotel bar. He approached casting director Don Phillips. Phillips recalls, "The bartender says to him, 'See that guy down there? That's Don Phillips. He cast Sean Penn in Fast Times.' And Matthew goes, 'I'm gonna go down and talk to this guy.'" Phillips also recalls that Linklater didn't like McConaughey at first "because he was too handsome". During production, another character named Pickford was meant to be a larger role. Due to the behavior of the actor playing Pickford with other cast members, his screen time was cut in favor of McConaughey's character, Wooderson. Linklater recalled "There was another actor who was kind of the opposite [of McConaughey]. He wasn't really getting along with everybody. I could tell the actors weren't responding to him." Much of the Wooderson role was improvised or written on the spot. Dazed and Confused was released on September 24, 1993, in 183 theaters, grossing $918,127 on its opening weekend. It went on to make $7.9 million in North America. The film received positive reviews from critics. The film generally gets favorable reviews. On review aggregator Rotten Tomatoes, it has a 92% approval rating. The website's critical consensus reads: "Featuring an excellent ensemble cast, a precise feel for the 1970s, and a killer soundtrack, Dazed and Confused is a funny, affectionate, and clear-eyed look at high school life." In her review for The Austin Chronicle, Marjorie Baumgarten gave particular praise to Matthew McConaughey's performance: "He is a character we're all too familiar with in the movies, but McConaughey nails this guy without a hint of condescension or whimsy, claiming this character for all time as his own".

In 1994, McConaughey acted in Angels in the Outfield, The Return of the Texas Chainsaw Massacre, and Daniel Johnston's music video "Life in Vain". McConaughey acted in Herbert Ross' Boys on the Side, which premiered on February 3, 1995. That year he also acted in a crime thriller, Brian Cox's Scorpion Spring. John Sayles' Lone Star (1996) is a neo-Western mystery film set in a small town in South Texas. McConaughey is in an ensemble cast that features Chris Cooper, Kris Kristofferson, and Elizabeth Peña. McConaughey played the lawyer Jake Brigance in Joel Schumacher's A Time to Kill which premiered July 24. The film is based on the John Grisham courtroom crime novel of the same name. In an ensemble piece McConaughey, Sandra Bullock, Samuel L. Jackson, and Kevin Spacey share the top billing. On Rotten Tomatoes the film has an approval rating of 67%. The critics' consensus reads: "Overlong and superficial, A Time to Kill nonetheless succeeds on the strength of its skillful craftsmanship and top-notch performances". In the U.S. it reached number one during its first two weeks and grossed over $108 million domestically, and an additional $43,500,000 was made internationally. At the MTV Movie Awards, McConaughey won Best Breakthrough Performance. Larger Than Life is a road comedy film starring Bill Murray and directed by Howard Franklin; McConaughey played a supporting role. Also that year he acted in Glory Daze. McConaughey starred in the science fiction film Contact (1997), directed by Robert Zemeckis, an adaptation of Carl Sagan's 1985 novel of the same name; Sagan and his wife Ann Druyan wrote the story outline for the film. In the film Jodie Foster portrays the film's protagonist. Also that year, McConaughey starred as then-lawyer Roger Sherman Baldwin in Steven Spielberg's Amistad.

The Newton Boys, co-written and directed by Richard Linklater, was released in 1998. It is based on the true story of the Newton Gang, a family of bank robbers from Uvalde, Texas. In 1999, McConaughey acted in EDtv. Directed by Ron Howard, it was an adaptation of the Quebecois film Louis 19, King of the Airwaves (Louis 19, le roi des ondes) (1994), The film was a box office bomb, grossing only $35.2 million from an $80 million production budget. In 2000, he starred in U-571, a submarine film directed by Jonathan Mostow.

=== 2001–2011: Romantic comedies and professional expansion ===
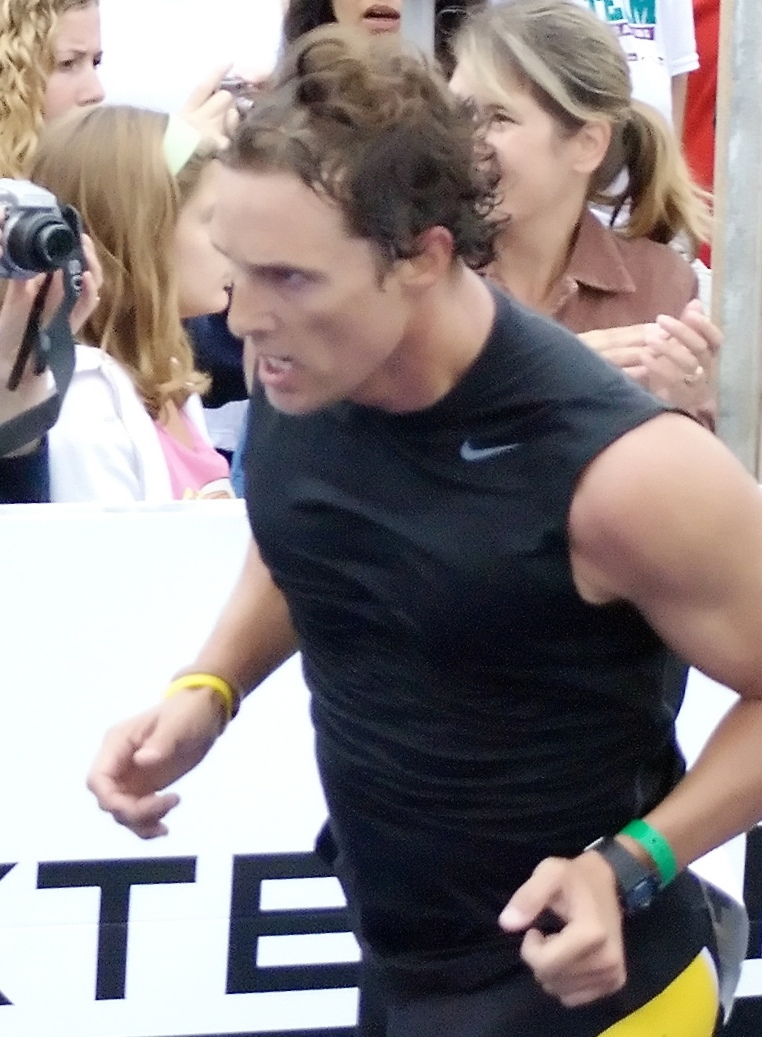
McConaughey in 2008, participating in the Nautica Malibu Triathlon

By the early 2000s, he was being cast in romantic comedies including The Wedding Planner and How to Lose a Guy in 10 Days; both were successful at the box office. These and others, such as Fool's Gold (2008), and Ghosts of Girlfriends Past (2009), established him as a sex symbol.

He appeared as a firefighter in a low-budget film, Tiptoes with Kate Beckinsale, in Two for the Money as a protégé to a gambling mogul, Al Pacino, and in Frailty with Bill Paxton who was also the director. McConaughey acted in the 2005 feature film Sahara; Steve Zahn and Penélope Cruz co-starred. Prior to the release of the film, he promoted it by sailing down the Amazon River and trekking to Mali. That same year, McConaughey was named People magazine's "Sexiest Man Alive" for 2005. In 2006 he co-starred with Sarah Jessica Parker in the romantic comedy Failure to Launch and as Marshall head football coach Jack Lengyel in We Are Marshall. McConaughey also provided voice work in an ad campaign for the Peace Corps in late 2006. He replaced Owen Wilson in Ben Stiller's Tropic Thunder after Wilson's suicide attempt. In 2008 McConaughey became the new spokesman for the national radio campaign, "Beef: It's What's for Dinner", replacing Sam Elliott.

McConaughey recognized that his "lifestyle, living on the beach, running with my shirt off, doing romantic comedies" had caused him to be typecast for certain roles, and he sought dramatic work with other themes. This shift in his choice of roles has been known as the "McConaissance" between 2011 and 2014. He said:

I got to feeling like, for a few years, I was doing something that I liked to do with romantic and action comedies. But believe me, I noticed there were other things that were not coming in. And if they were coming in, it was in an independent form with a much smaller paycheck, and nobody really wanting to get behind them ... But I knew I could say no to the things I'd been doing. In saying no to those things, I knew work was going to dry up for awhile ... Year and a half, still nothing. At two years, all of a sudden, in my opinion, I became a new good idea for some good directors.

=== 2011–2014: Established actor ===
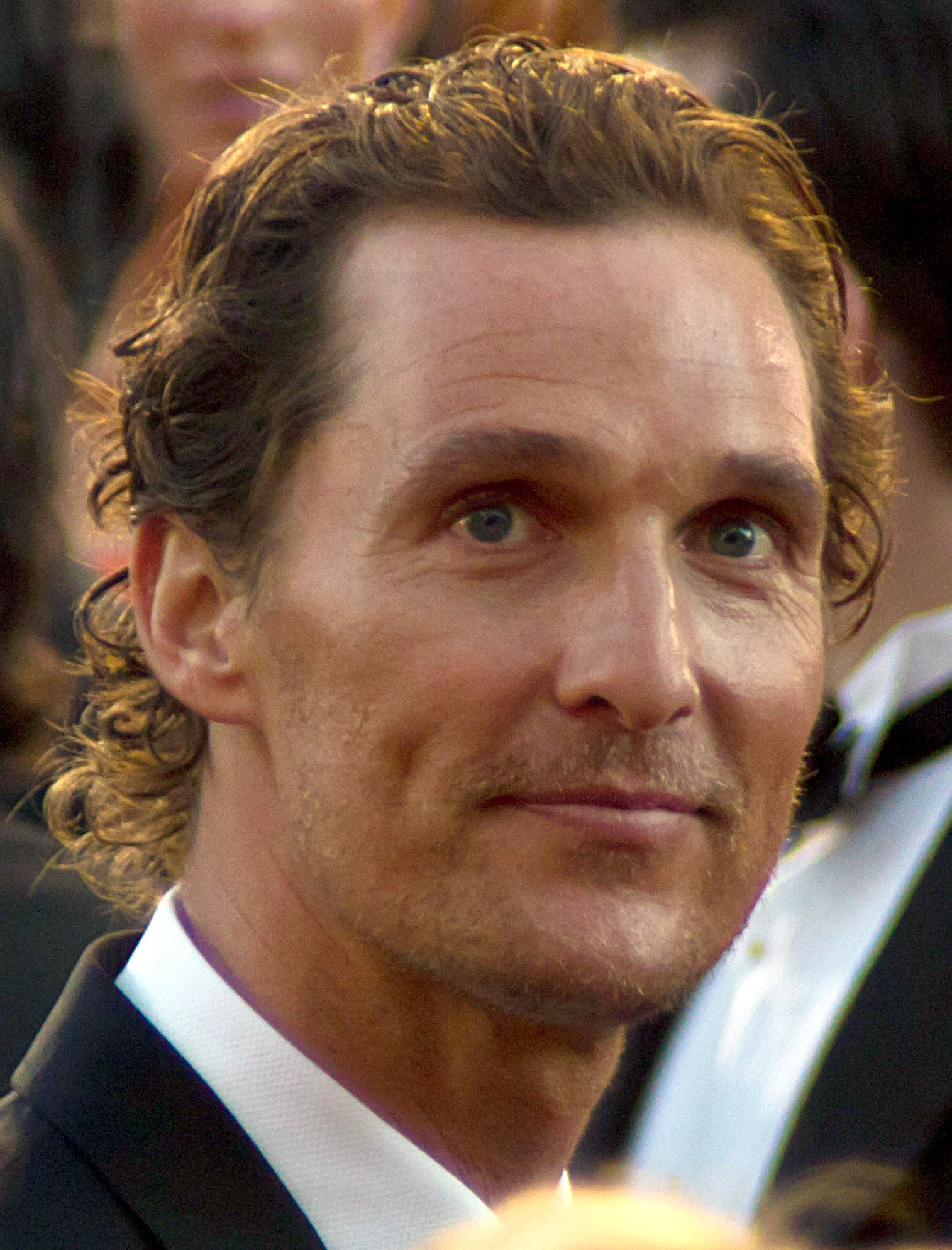
McConaughey at the 83rd Academy Awards in 2011

In 2012, McConaughey starred alongside Channing Tatum in Magic Mike, based on Tatum's early life; it was directed by Steven Soderbergh. Also in 2012 came Mud, which gained him praise for his role as a fugitive. He returned to his East Texas roots, working again with director Richard Linklater on Bernie, playing district attorney Danny Buck Davidson. In June 2012, McConaughey was invited to join the Academy of Motion Picture Arts and Sciences.

In 2013 he portrayed Ron Woodroof in the biographical drama Dallas Buyers Club. The role of a rodeo rider who discovers he has AIDS and struggles to get treatment required him to lose nearly 50 lb (22 kg). The film earned McConaughey numerous accolades, including the Screen Actors Guild Award for Outstanding Performance by a Male Actor in a Leading Role, the Golden Globe Award for Best Actor – Drama, and the Academy Award for Best Actor. His co-star Jared Leto won the Academy Award for Best Supporting Actor for his role as Rayon, making Dallas Buyers Club the first film since Mystic River (2003) to win both awards. He was featured in Martin Scorsese's The Wolf of Wall Street as Mark Hanna, an early boss of Jordan Belfort. During this time, McConaughey recorded a public service announcement in Austin, Texas for the LBJ Presidential Library.

In April 2014, Time magazine included McConaughey in its annual Time 100 as one of the "Most Influential People in the World". In August 2014, the Lincoln Motor Company signed a multi-year collaboration with McConaughey for an ad campaign. The commercials, directed by Nicolas Winding Refn (Drive), featured McConaughey as a storyteller driving a Lincoln's MKC crossover. Shortly after the commercials debuted in September 2014, they were parodied by Ellen DeGeneres, Conan O'Brien, Jim Carrey, South Park, and Saturday Night Live. Overall sales for Lincoln increased by 25 percent one month after the ads debuted. The series of commercials starring McConaughey continued for several more years; during this period he also endorsed the MKZ sedan, MKX and Nautilus crossovers and Aviator SUV.

In 2014, McConaughey received a star on the Hollywood Walk of Fame; it is located on 6931 Hollywood Boulevard. Also in the same year, he shared star billing with Woody Harrelson in HBO's crime drama anthology series True Detective. For his role as Rust Cohle, he won the Critics' Choice Television Award for Best Actor in a Drama Series. He was also nominated for the Primetime Emmy Award for Outstanding Lead Actor in a Drama Series, which he lost to Bryan Cranston and the Golden Globe Award for Best Actor – Miniseries or Television Film. With his first Oscar win and the critical acclaim received for True Detective, "McConaughey seems to be tapping into something essential, remaining himself while stretching, getting older while staying the same age." Critic Rachel Syme dubbed his recognition and performances while taking on more complex, dramatic roles as "The McConaissance". The same year, McConaughey received critical acclaim for playing Cooper, a widowed father and astronaut in Christopher Nolan's epic science fiction film Interstellar (2014).

=== 2015–2019: Career fluctuations ===
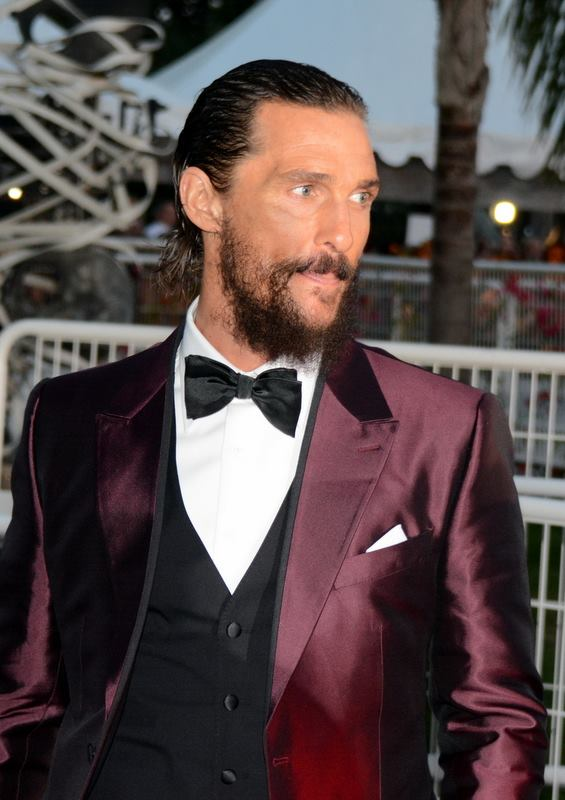
McConaughey at the 2015 Cannes Film Festival

After finishing Gus Van Sant's 2015 film The Sea of Trees with Ken Watanabe, in 2016, McConaughey starred in two films, Free State of Jones and Gold, and voiced leading characters in two animated films, Kubo and the Two Strings and Sing. In 2016, McConaughey was hired as creative director and celebrity spokesman for Wild Turkey's latest campaign, to bring in more women and more international customers.

McConaughey starred as Walter Padick in the 2017 Stephen King adaptation The Dark Tower, which received negative reactions from most critics. In 2018, he starred in the true life gangster drama White Boy Rick, which gained mixed reviews. In 2019, he headlined the erotic thriller Serenity, that also starred Diane Lane and Anne Hathaway. The film was panned by both critics and audiences after its release on January 25. McConaughey next had the starring role in Harmony Korine's The Beach Bum, a comedy also featuring Zac Efron and Jonah Hill. The film was released on March 29, 2019. In late 2019 McConaughey appeared in the Guy Ritchie film The Gentlemen, playing fictional cannabis baron Mickey Pearson.

=== 2020–present: Limited work ===
In 2020 McConaughey published a memoir, Greenlights. On February 6, 2023, it was announced that he voiced an animated version of Elvis Presley on the Netflix animated series Agent Elvis, released on March 17, 2023. McConaughey returned to feature acting in 2025, starring in the crime film The Rivals of Amziah King, which premiered at the South by Southwest festival in March to critical acclaim. He is also starring in Paul Greengrass' survival thriller The Lost Bus as a bus driver navigating the 2018 Camp Fire; the film was released on Apple TV+ in October 2025. That same year, McConaughey was granted voice and likeness trademarks with the United States Patent and Trademark Office. His lawyer, Kevin Yorn, stated that the goal was to "protect someone's stealing somebody's voice" with the misuse of artificial intelligence.

== Personal life ==
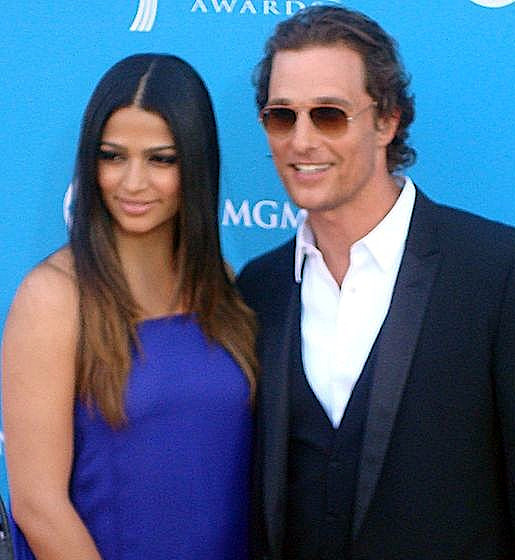
McConaughey and his wife, Camila Alves, in 2010

McConaughey met Camila Alves in 2006. He and Alves became engaged on December 25, 2011, and were married in a private Catholic ceremony on June 9, 2012, in Austin, where they reside. Together, they have three children. Reflecting on having kids, in 2026, he said: "When you have children, that’s the literal form of becoming immortal. They live on, and how much of you can they carry forward." A Christian, McConaughey often speaks publicly about his faith. He attends a non-denominational church. He has stated that he has privately received personal criticism and judgment for his beliefs from some members of Hollywood:

I have had – and I won't throw any people under the bus – but I have had moments where I was on stage receiving an award in front of my peers in Hollywood, and there were people in the crowd that I have prayed with before dinners many times, and when I thanked God, I saw some of those people go to clap, but then notice that, "bad thing on my resume" and then sit back on their hands.

In 2019, he became a minority owner of Austin FC, a team in Major League Soccer which began play in 2021, with McConaughey as the team's "minister of culture". McConaughey has been a longtime fan of the Washington Commanders football team.

In 2023, McConaughey stated that he and longtime friend and True Detective co-star/co-executive producer Woody Harrelson could be half-brothers. His mother claimed to have been intimate with Harrelson's father, Charles Harrelson, around the time of McConaughey's conception. In September 2023, Madame Tussauds New York unveiled a new wax figure of Matthew McConaughey, inspired by his 2021 appearance on The Tonight Show. The event, featured during McConaughey's visit to The View, promoted his children's book, Just Because. In September 2025, he published another book, Poems & Prayers. McConaughey and his wife became the godparents of Princess Cruises ship Star Princess in the christening ceremony in Fort Lauderdale, Florida on November 7, 2025.

== Politics ==
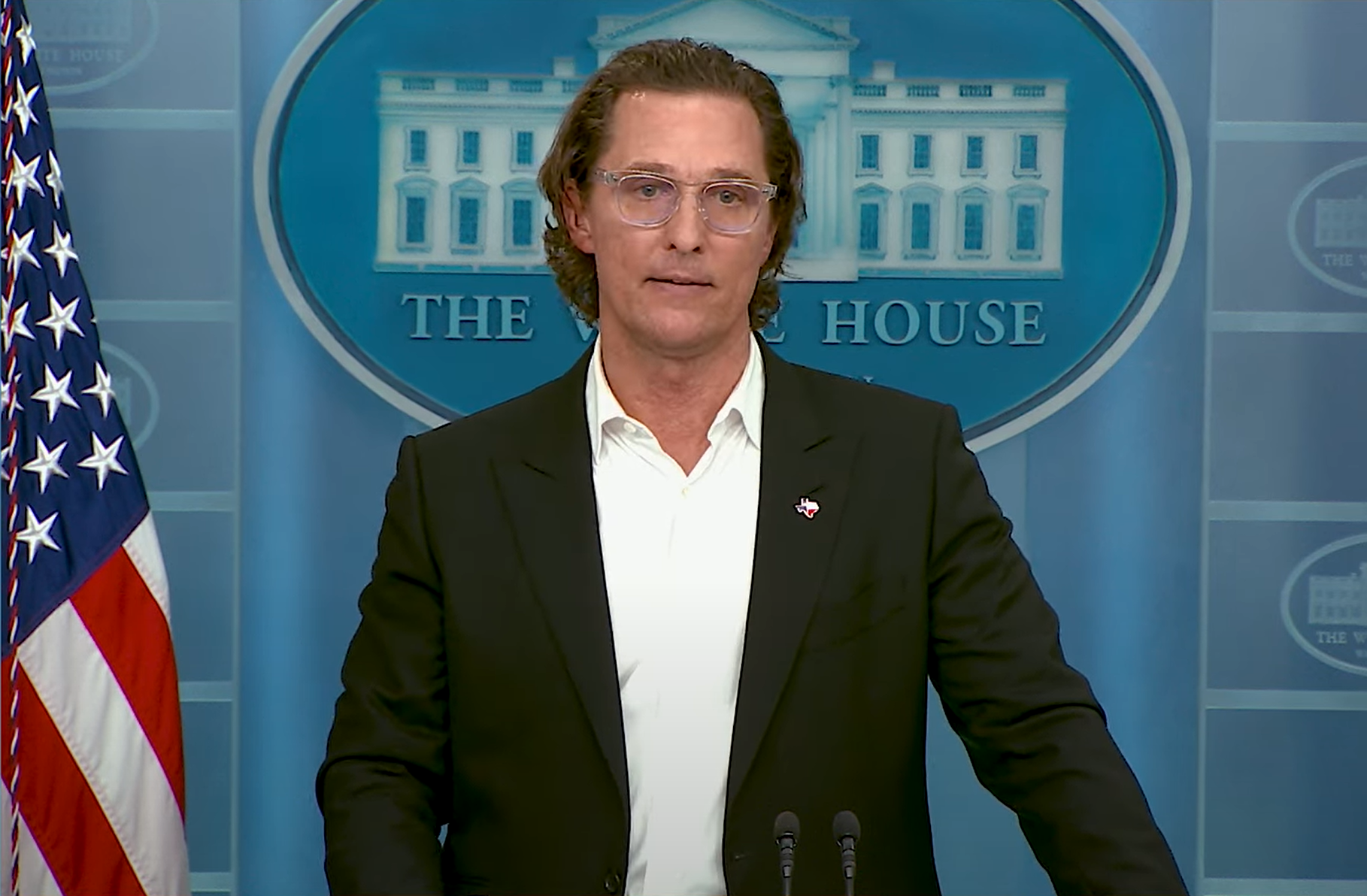
McConaughey speaking at the White House in the aftermath of the Uvalde school shooting in 2022

In a November 2020 appearance on The Late Show with Stephen Colbert, McConaughey denied he was interested in running for governor. The Texas Tribune reported on McConaughey's lack of involvement in politics, saying that he had not voted in a primary race since "at least" 2012 and had never donated to a political campaign at the state or federal level up through 2021. He had voted in the 2018 Texas elections and the 2020 United States elections.

In March 2021, McConaughey confirmed that he was considering running in the 2022 Texas gubernatorial election. In an October 2021 Twitter Spaces interview with NPR, McConaughey was asked if he was going to run for governor of Texas. He replied, "I am not – until I am." When asked questions about political issues, such as voting rights and abortion, McConaughey opted to remain "purposely vague", and he did not disclose his political party. Just over two weeks before the Texas primary candidate filing deadline, McConaughey released a video on his official Twitter profile stating that he would not be competing for the office.

External videos
- White House daily briefing with McConaughey and Press Secretary Karine Jean-Pierre, June 7, 2022, C-SPAN

In June 2022, McConaughey joined the White House press briefing and advocated for "commonsense gun laws" during a 20-minute speech, in which he spoke about the Uvalde school shooting, which occurred in his hometown of Uvalde. He said, "We need responsible gun ownership. We need background checks. We need to raise the minimum age to purchase an AR-15 rifle to 21. We need a waiting period for those rifles. We need red flag laws and consequences for those who abuse them." CNN described the speech as "impassioned and at-times emotional". In July 2024, McConaughey spoke at the annual National Governors Association meeting. He reiterated his interest in running for political office and said he has been "on a learning tour".

== Philanthropy ==
McConaughey started the "just keep livin foundation", which is "dedicated to helping teenage kids lead active lives and make healthy choices to become great men and women". On February 25, 2016, McConaughey received the Creative Conscience award from unite4:humanity for his work with his foundation. In 2019, McConaughey officially became a professor of practice for the Department of Radio-Television-Film at the Moody College of Communication at his alma mater, UT-Austin; he had served as a visiting instructor since 2015. The first two sessions were about the filming of the movie Free State of Jones.

== Books written ==
- McConaughey, Matthew (October 20, 2020). Greenlights (First hardcover ed.). New York: Crown. ISBN 978-0593139134. OCLC 1202271282.
- McConaughey, Matthew (September 12, 2023). Just Because (Children's picture book). New York: Viking Children's Books. ISBN 978-0593622032. OCLC 1394096990.
- McConaughey, Matthew (September 16, 2025). Poems & Prayers (First hardcover ed.). New York: Crown. ISBN 978-1984862105. OCLC 1523890581.
