= Scorpion Spring =

- Directed by: Brian Cox
- Written by: Brian Cox
- Produced by: Anant Singh
- Starring: Esai Morales; Rubén Blades; Alfred Molina; Matthew McConaughey
- Cinematography: Nancy Schreiber
- Edited by: Steve Nevius
- Music by: Lalo Schifrin
- Release date: October 20, 1995 (Hamptons)
- Running time: 90 minutes
- Country: United States
- Language: English

Scorpion Spring is a 1995 American crime thriller film written and directed by Brian Cox and starring Esai Morales, Rubén Blades, Alfred Molina and Matthew McConaughey.

== Cast ==
- Alfred Molina as Denis Brabant
- Patrick McGaw as Zac Cross
- Esai Morales as Astor
- Angel Aviles as Nadia
- Rubén Blades as Border Patrolman Sam Zaragosa
- Kevin Tighe as California County Sheriff Rawley Gill
- Richard Edson as Len Wells
- Matthew McConaughey as El Rojo
- Connie Sawyer as Diner Waitress
- Miguel Sandoval as Mexican Judicial
- Tony Genaro as Arturo
