= Brian Cox (director) =

American writer and director

- Born: Virginia
- Occupations: producer, Writer, director
- Years active: 1990–present

Brian Cox is an American writer, director and producer of various independent films and television. He is perhaps best known for the films Scorpion Spring, Keepin' It Real and the live-action adaption of El Muerto: The Aztec Zombie, the latter of which won the Best Feature Film Award at the first annual Whittier Film Festival. One of his first credited roles in film was as a script consultant for the 1990 thriller film Behind Bedroom Doors II.

== Filmography ==
=== Film ===
Year	Film	Notes
1990	Terminal Bliss	producer
1993	The Obit Writer	Short film, runtime: 25 min.
1996	Scorpion Spring	
2001	Keepin' It Real	Nominated for Best Screenplay at the DVD Exclusive Awards
2007	El Muerto	Awarded Best Feature Film at the Whittier Film Festival
2014	Kite	screenwriter
2016	Shepherds and Butchers	screenwriter

=== Television ===
Year	Program	Notes
2002	Studio Bob	
