= The Newton Boys =

1998 American crime film by Richard Linklater

- Theatrical release poster
- Directed by: Richard Linklater
- Screenplay by: Richard Linklater; Claude Stanush; Clark Lee Walker
- Based on: The Newton Boys by Claude Stanush
- Produced by: Anne Walker-McBay
- Starring: Matthew McConaughey; Ethan Hawke; Skeet Ulrich; Vincent D'Onofrio; Dwight Yoakam; Julianna Margulies
- Cinematography: Peter James
- Edited by: Sandra Adair
- Music by: Edward D. Barnes
- Production company: Detour Filmproduction
- Distributed by: 20th Century Fox
- Release date: March 27, 1998
- Running time: 122 minutes
- Country: United States
- Language: English
- Budget: $27 million
- Box office: $10,452,012

The Newton Boys is a 1998 American crime film directed by Richard Linklater, who co-wrote the screenplay with Claude Stanush and Clark Lee Walker. It is based on Stanush's 1994 book of the same name, which tells the true story of the Newton Gang, a family of bank and train robbers from Uvalde, Texas. The film stars Matthew McConaughey, who was born in Uvalde, Skeet Ulrich, Ethan Hawke, Vincent D'Onofrio, and Dwight Yoakam.

It was filmed throughout Texas including the towns of Bertram, Austin, Bartlett, New Braunfels, and San Antonio. The film was a box office disappointment and received a mixed reception from critics, some noting that the film falls short of Linklater's other work.

== Plot ==
A miscarriage of justice lands Willis Newton languished in prison, he encountered a harsh reality: money held the key to societal status within the unforgiving confines. Determined to climb the social ladder, he joined forces with Slim and Glasscock, two fellow inmates, to pull off a daring bank robbery in broad daylight. Their audacious plan failed, and Slim was captured during their hasty escape on horseback. Willis and Glasscock, however, escaped and found a bank director willing to purchase their stolen war bonds. This lucrative encounter provided them with vital information about countless other banks, paving the way for their lucrative criminal careers.

Willis and Glasscock embarked on a series of nocturnal bank robberies, using cars as their mode of escape. Glasscock proved to be a master of nitroglycerin, effectively utilizing the explosive to blast open safes. Willis, driven by a sense of injustice, convinced his brothers to support their criminal enterprise, arguing that bankers were the true crooks and that robbing them was merely a case of little thieves stealing from big thieves. He further rationalized their actions by emphasizing that all banks were insured, and that the insurance companies would ultimately benefit from their robberies by increasing their sales.

The Newton gang's prolific bank robbing spree continued unabated, and some bankers proved to be dishonest in exaggerating their losses. This prompted insurance companies to pressure banks into investing in enhanced safes, impervious to nitroglycerin. Faced with this setback, the Newtons shifted their operations to Toronto, where they targeted a cash transport vehicle in broad daylight.

Despite meticulously planning their Toronto heist, unforeseen events disrupted their execution, resulting in a narrow escape for the gang members. Undeterred, Willis resolved to abandon his criminal ways and become a legitimate businessman. However, his investment in an oil well turned sour and drained his finances, leaving him devastated. In his despair, he questioned his faith, convinced that God had thwarted his attempts to go straight.

Desperate for redemption, Willis was easily drawn into another criminal venture: the robbery of a night-time train. (Note: The train robbery depicted was that of the Milwaukee Road's Fast Mail on June 12, 1924.) Glasscock, once an expert with nitroglycerin, proved less proficient with a gun. In a moment of panic, he mistook Willis' brother, Dock Newton, for a guard and accidentally shot him. Willis, driven by loyalty, sought medical attention for his wounded brother, inadvertently exposing their identities.

In the end, all the Newton brothers are finally arrested and sentenced for their crimes. The once-notorious gang, driven by a misguided sense of justice and a thirst for financial security, met their bitter end within the confines of a prison.

== Cast ==
- Matthew McConaughey as Willis Newton
- Skeet Ulrich as Joe Newton
- Ethan Hawke as Jess Newton
- Vincent D'Onofrio as Wylie "Dock" Newton
- Dwight Yoakam as Brentwood "Brent Glass" Glasscock
- Chloe Webb as Avis Glasscock
- Gail Cronauer as Ma Newton
- Julianna Margulies as Louise Brown
- Anne Stedman as Madeline
- Lew Temple as The Waiter
- Charles Gunning as "Slim"
- Ken Farmer as Ranger Frank Hamer
- David Jensen as William Fahy
- Bo Hopkins as FBI Agent K.P. Aldrich
- Luke Askew as Chief Shoemaker

== Reception ==
The film received mixed reviews from critics, with a 65% rating on Rotten Tomatoes based on 40 reviews. The site's consensus states: "The Newton Boys uses a sharp cast and absorbing period detail to help make up for the frustrations of a story puzzlingly short on dramatic tension." Metacritic gave the film a score of 57 based on 20 reviews, indicating "mixed or average reviews". Audiences polled by CinemaScore gave the film an average grade of "B−" on an A+ to F scale.

Roger Ebert gave the film two stars, writing "It's not an enormous cast, and yet somehow the Newtons are hard to tell apart--not in appearance, but in personality...the film as a whole seems drained of thrust and energy--especially compared to (Richard Linklater's) earlier films."
