= Bernie (2011 film) =

- Theatrical release poster
- Directed by: Richard Linklater
- Screenplay by: Richard Linklater; Skip Hollandsworth
- Based on: "Midnight in the Garden of East Texas" by Skip Hollandsworth
- Produced by: Liz Glotzer; Richard Linklater; David McFadzean; Dete Meserve; Judd Payne; Celine Rattray; Martin Shafer; Ginger Sledge; Matt Williams
- Starring: Jack Black; Shirley MacLaine; Matthew McConaughey
- Cinematography: Dick Pope
- Edited by: Sandra Adair
- Music by: Graham Reynolds
- Production companies: Castle Rock Entertainment (absent); Mandalay Vision; Wind Dancer Films; Detour Filmproduction; Collins House Productions; Horsethief Pictures
- Distributed by: Millennium Entertainment
- Release dates: June 16, 2011 (LAFF); April 27, 2012 (United States)
- Running time: 99 minutes
- Country: United States
- Language: English
- Budget: $6 million
- Box office: $10.1 million

Bernie is a 2011 American biographical black comedy film directed by Richard Linklater, and written by Linklater and Skip Hollandsworth. The film stars Jack Black, Shirley MacLaine and Matthew McConaughey. Filmed entirely in mockumentary and true crime elements, the film is based on Hollandsworth's January 1998 article, "Midnight in the Garden of East Texas", published in Texas Monthly magazine and covering the 1996 murder of 81-year-old millionaire Marjorie Nugent (MacLaine) in Carthage, Texas, by her 39-year-old companion, Bernhardt "Bernie" Tiede (Black).

The film received critical acclaim for its direction, accuracy in relation to the facts, "Town Gossips" mockumentary format, and particular praise for Jack Black's performance. The film led to a renewed public interest in the case, which briefly led to Tiede’s release from prison before he was ultimately resentenced.

== Plot ==
In small-town Carthage, Texas, local assistant mortician Bernie Tiede is a beloved member of the community, known for his charismatic demeanor, extreme charity, and heavy community involvement. Hired as a mortician at the Leggett Funeral Home by its director Don, Tiede quickly takes to the role thanks to his salesmanship, use of flair in funerals, and propensity to dote on elderly widows during and after the funeral arrangements. The latter point makes some residents believe that Tiede is attracted to elderly women, while others - including hard-broiled and arrogant district attorney Danny Buck Davidson - believe him to be gay instead.

In March 1990, Tiede arranges the funeral of a local oilman and banker, where he meets his wealthy widow, Marjorie Nugent. Nugent has an extremely poor reputation, being incredibly irritable and sadistic towards everyone, including her family, while lashing out at the rest of the world and accusing them of abandoning her. When Tiede begins doting on Nugent, she takes a liking to him and rediscovers her zest for life. Tiede, in his late 30s, and the elderly Nugent quickly become inseparable, frequently traveling the world and lunching together.

Over time, Nugent's demands for affection from Tiede increase significantly, and she becomes emotionally abusive. She makes him the sole inheritor of her will as well as her financial manager, and by 1993, Tiede has been extorted into quitting his mortician job to become Nugent's full-time assistant. Tiede soon becomes unable to manage his personal life, as Nugent constantly demands his attention away, yells at him even when he does everything correctly, and becomes increasingly hostile towards everyone else. At one point, she tries to get him to shoot a nine-banded armadillo that she believes is digging up her yard with her .22 caliber rifle, and yells at him when he fails to do so.

On November 19, 1996, after Nugent refuses to attend a community production of The Music Man that Tiede is directing and starring in, Tiede impulsively shoots her in the back with the rifle four times, killing her. Praying for guidance, he buries her corpse in a large freezer chest, hoping to stall until her body can be found without any connection to him. Over the next nine months, Tiede makes numerous excuses for her absence towards her associates. As her wealth manager, meanwhile, his habitual charity gets even worse; he spends $600,000 of Nugent's money on local businesses and elaborate gifts. This causes the town to adore him further, but Nugent's long-suffering family stockbroker Lloyd Hornbuckle has his suspicions aroused when he discovers that Nugent, via Tiede, has neglected to give previously agreed-upon payments to her estranged family.

While Tiede is out of the house, Hornbuckle, the sheriff, and Nugent's granddaughter Molly seize the opportunity for an authorized police search of Nugent's house. Nugent's body is found in the freezer by a deputy. Tiede is arrested and immediately confesses to the crime, while citing Nugent's controlling nature as a mitigating circumstance. Davidson is put on the case and charges Tiede with first-degree murder despite his claim that it was not premeditated. Despite Tiede's confession, many citizens of Carthage rally to his defense, even claiming Nugent deserved to die. Realizing he will be unable to procure an unbiased jury, Davidson successfully requests a change of venue to San Augustine. At the same time, all of the things that Tiede bought are confiscated, closing many local businesses and crippling Carthage's economy.

During the trial, Davidson accuses Tiede of intending to use Nugent's wealth for hedonistic purposes, while Tiede's defense attorney Scrappy Holmes tries to turn the blame on Molly for cutting ties with Nugent for years. Tiede is found guilty and given a life sentence. The town remains appalled, and Tiede continues to get regular visitors who still believe him to be a good man. Closing text reveals that Nugent was buried next to her husband, while Tiede continues his active social life in prison.

== Cast ==
- Jack Black as Bernie Tiede
- Shirley MacLaine as Marjorie "Margie" Nugent
- Matthew McConaughey as Danny Buck Davidson
- Brady Coleman as Scrappy Holmes
- Richard Robichaux as Lloyd Hornbuckle
- Rick Dial as Don Leggett
- Brandon Smith as Sheriff Huckabee
- Larry Jack Dotson as the Rev. Woodard
- Merrilee McCommas as Molly Freeman
- Mathew Greer as Carl Lawrence
- Gabriel Luna as Kevin Schneider (uncredited)

Additionally, the various unnamed townspeople in the film are portrayed by: Marjorie Dome, Tim Cariker, Fern Luker, Jack Payne, Sonny Davis, Chris Humphrey, Ann Reeves, Kay Epperson, Ira Bounds, James Baker, Kay McConaughey, Kristi Youngblood, Kenny Brevard, Margaret Bowman, Mollie Fuller, Tanja Givens, Glenda Jone, Travis Blevins, Sylvia Forman, Martha Long, Jo Perkins, Reba Tarjick, Dale Dudley, James Wilson, Teresa Edwards, Billy Vaticalos, Rob Anthony, Tommy Kendrick, Pam McDonald, Kathy Gollmitzer, and Cozette McNeely.

== Production ==
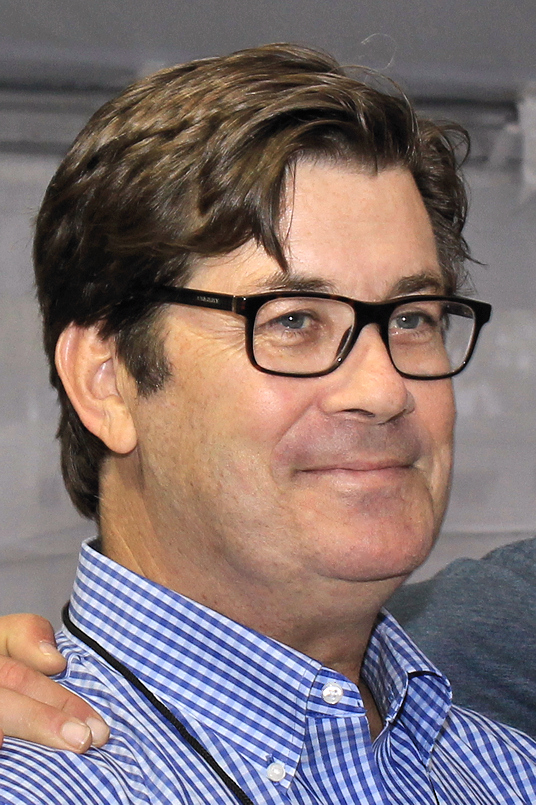
Author Skip Hollandsworth in 2016.

The film was based on an article in Texas Monthly magazine by Skip Hollandsworth, who co-wrote the screenplay with Linklater. Principal photography took 22 days, during September–October 2010, in Bastrop, Smithville, Georgetown, Lockhart, Carthage, and Austin, Texas.

The film mixes documentary conventions with fictional elements. There are talking-head interviews with Carthage townspeople; some of the talking heads are actors, while some are townspeople playing themselves.

Linklater said the screenplay that he co-wrote with Skip Hollandsworth was a boring read, and that "the gossip element almost kept the film from being made, because it reads boring. I said, 'But they’ll be funny characters. I could just imagine the accents.'”

The film is dedicated in memory of Rick Dial, who portrayed funeral home director Don Leggett in the film.

== Release ==
The film's world premiere was as the opening-night film of the 2011 Los Angeles Film Festival. Millennium Entertainment released the film on April 27, 2012.

== Reception ==
=== Critical response ===
On Rotten Tomatoes, the film has an 88% rating, based on 166 reviews, with an average rating of 7.40/10. The site's critical consensus reads, "Richard Linklater's Bernie is a gently told and unexpectedly amusing true-crime comedy that benefits from an impressive performance by Jack Black". On Metacritic, the film has a 75 out of 100, based on 35 critics, indicating "generally favorable" reviews.

Roger Ebert of the Chicago Sun-Times enjoyed the film, giving it 3.5 out of 4. He praised Black's performance as well as Linklater's direction, saying "His genius was to see Jack Black as Bernie Tiede."

Critic Jonathan Rosenbaum called the film a masterpiece, describing it as a companion piece to Linklater's 1998 film The Newton Boys, and saying the writing is:

so good that the humor can’t be reduced to simple satire; a whole community winds up speaking through the film, and it has a lot to say. In fact, it’s hard to think of many other celebrations of small-town American life that are quite as rich, as warm, and as complexly layered, at least within recent years.

He put it on his Top 10 of the 2010–2019 decade.

In a positive review in Slate, Dana Stevens lauded the performances of the three leads, saying that both Black and McConaughey are at their best when working with Linklater. But she reserved her highest praise for "the good people of Carthage, who, sitting on porches or the hoods of their cars, recount the strange story of Bernie Tiede and Marjorie Nugent".

Marc Savlov of The Austin Chronicle said:

If I hadn't already read Skip Hollandsworth's Texas Monthly article recounting the tragicomic tale of Carthage's assistant funeral director Bernie Tiede, I'd swear this film adaptation was based on one of Joe R. Lansdale's East Texas gothics. As ever, truth proves itself stranger than fiction and the human heart (which is stranger and more inscrutable than anything). And Jack Black redeems himself (for Gulliver's Travels, among other things) with a subtly quirky performance that's one of his personal best.

Gregory Ellwood of HitFix said the film is "not as funny as Linklater wants it to be...". But he praised Black's performance: "Black is simply great... making you believe someone like Bernie could really exist and while accenting his funny characteristics also portraying him as three-dimensional character."

Eric Kohn of indieWIRE called it "an oddly endearing love letter to Southern eccentricities". He found the film hard to categorize, saying: "Bernie is a shape-shifting genre vehicle set apart from anything else in Linklater’s career. There’s a loose sensibility to this mockumentary—mysterious comedy? comedic mystery? It’s tough to categorize as anything beyond an enjoyable experience."

Mary Pols, writing in Time, gave the film an unfavorable review: "You would be hard pressed to find a film that feels more true to a reporter’s experience of an event. This isn’t necessarily a good thing, at least not cinematically... The movie translation is playful and cunning but never escapes the reportorial trap; observation after the fact rarely matches the energy of experience... The big problem with playing this same note over and over again is that while the pairing of an 81-year-old harridan and the 39-year-old effeminate mensch, whether off on a cruise together or dining at the local taqueria, may sound funny, it’s mostly just sad."

Owen Gleiberman of Entertainment Weekly ranked the film as one of the top ten films of 2012, calling it a "deviously droll light-comic tabloid docudrama".

=== Local response ===
The film divided citizens of Carthage. In the film, Linklater includes interviews with several Carthage residents about their feelings on the events. Some citizens hoped the film will stimulate an increase in tourism, while others voiced anger that a comedy film was derived from the events surrounding the murder of an 81-year-old woman.

"You can't make a dark comedy out of a murder", says Panola County District Attorney Danny Buck Davidson (portrayed in the film by McConaughey). "This movie is not historically-accurate", adds Davidson, who says that Nugent's story is missing. "The movie does not tell her side of the story."

"If it was fiction it might be funny, but this was a real person in a real town and no, I don't think it's funny at all", says Carthage resident Toni Clements, who knew both Tiede and Nugent.

Owners of the Hawthorn Funeral Home in Carthage, where Tiede met Nugent, refused to allow the film to use the name of the funeral home. “We felt we did not want the Hawthorn Funeral Home name or family name thought of in a dark comedy... You always know locally these are real people and families so there is a sting.”

"I've now seen the movie Bernie twice and, except for a few insignificant details ... it tells the story pretty much the way it happened", Joe Rhodes, Nugent's nephew, wrote in The New York Times Magazine shortly before the film's general release. Rod, Nugent's only child, did not return his calls. His lawyer sent Rhodes a letter strongly suggesting the possibility of legal action for his remarks. Rhodes said, "I guarantee he [Rod] won't like it".

=== Accolades ===
Bernie earned nominations for Best Feature and Best Ensemble Performance at the 2012 Gotham Awards. At the 2013 Independent Spirit Awards, the film was nominated for Best Feature and Black was nominated for Best Male Lead.

The National Board of Review included Bernie in their Top 10 Independent Films. The Broadcast Film Critics Association nominated Bernie for Best Comedy, Black for Best Actor in a Comedy, and MacLaine for Best Actress in a Comedy.

A reader survey by the Los Angeles Times ranked it as the "most under-appreciated" film of 2012, from a shortlist of seven films selected by the newspaper.

Bernie won Rotten Tomatoes' 14th annual Golden Tomato award for the best reviewed comedy released in 2012.

Jack Black's performance as Tiede earned him a Golden Globe nomination for Best Actor in a Musical or Comedy.

Matthew McConaughey's portrayal of Danny Buck Davidson received several nominations and won for Best Supporting Actor from the New York Film Critics Circle and from the National Society of Film Critics.

=== Influence ===
Having seen the film, Austin-based attorney Jodi Cole met with director, Richard Linklater, for further information about the case. After meeting with Tiede at the prison, she began work on a habeas corpus petition in his case, raising issues not addressed in his previous direct appeal. Tiede was released from his life sentence in May 2014 on $10,000 bail, with the condition that he live with Linklater in Austin, Texas.

Nugent's granddaughter expressed shock that the release was granted, suggesting that it was due to the film's portrayal of Tiede.

On January 2, 2015, an Austin, Texas news channel reported that the district attorney agreed to release Tiede and was not ruling out a future prosecution. Panola County prosecutor Danny Buck Davidson said that he had met members of Marjorie Nugent's family. He believed the film led to successful efforts to have Tiede paroled early from a life sentence. Out on bond, Tiede was due back in court March 2015.

Davidson eventually agreed that Tiede was wrongly sentenced for first-degree murder when he deserved a lesser sentence. On April 22, 2016, after a resentencing hearing in Henderson, Texas, a jury deliberated for four-and-a-half hours. They sentenced Tiede to serve a prison term of 99 years to life.

== Footnote ==
1. The "Castle Rock Entertainment" logo and in-credit text does not appear in this film's opening.
