= Beasts of the Southern Wild (soundtrack) =

Beasts of the Southern Wild (Music from the Motion Picture)

Soundtrack album by Dan Romer and Benh Zeitlin
- Released: June 26, 2012
- Studio: Electric Comoland (Lafayette, Louisiana); Drawing Number One (Los Angeles, California)
- Genre: Film score
- Length: 36:11
- Label: 33 1/3rd

Beasts of the Southern Wild (Music from the Motion Picture) is the soundtrack to the 2012 film Beasts of the Southern Wild directed by Benh Zeitlin, who co-composed the film score with Dan Romer. Released on June 26, 2012 through 33 1/3rd Records, the score met with critical acclaim and received several accolades.

== Development ==
Beasts of the Southern Wild marked Romer's feature film scoring debut, as was Zeitlin's. Both Romer and Zeitlin worked at the short film Glory at Sea (2008) and shared a good rapport. According to Zeitlin, he thought of writing music even before scripting the film, as comparing to integrating the film's music within the completed script, he found writing the story from a musical place made it very easier and could integrate themes, melodies and chord progressions within the screenplay. The score was written in Hushpuppy's (Quvenzhané Wallis) point of view where the voice-over eventually takes the quality of the lyrics in a song, and they eventually took that direction to explore Hushpuppy's internal world. The music is played when Hushpuppy analyses herself and when she is unstable, Romer and Zeitlin refrained from the use of music as "she is not in a space to contemplate and analyze the world."

Initially, Romer and Zeitlin wanted to score the film in a way of traditional Cajun music, but as the character's thoughts did not really come from Louisiana culture and the score should showcase her mystical side of her personality. The Cajun music is played live with the musicians playing onscreen and as Hushpuppy thought about it, the actual score re-voices the song into her type of music. Zeitlin gave him the song "The Balfa Waltz" ("Off the Wall/Valse de Balfa") where the song goes at one chord and traverses into the second for a moment. When the Cajun song is played, the orchestra appears and re-harmonizes in the way she hears things. He wanted the score to have a grandeur but should be also liked by children, hence the film's music had been influenced by modern pop owing to Wallis' taste of music and eventually wrote a song that Hushpuppy dances in the end credits. Zeitlin and Romer listened to Kate Bush's "Hounds of Love" and "This Woman's Work" during the production, where the strings and melodic themes eventually served as the basis of that song. Other influences of the musical score were Michael Nyman and Damon Albarn's score for Ravenous (1999), Caleb Sampson's score for Fast, Cheap & Out of Control (1997) and works from Carter Burwell and John Williams.

The orchestra consisted of folk instruments, banjo, fiddle, accordion, guitar, strings, horns, piano and percussion sounds—created from the sounds of table and chair which provided a rickety and swinging sound—as a part of the large musical texture accompanying the score. However, the celeste and bell piano were used as the sounds representing Hushpuppy as these being most foreign to other instrumentation and textures in the film. The celeste served as the voice for her cosmic philosophies, which was reminiscent of The Nutcracker. Romer textured French jazz chords for her mother's character, and used traditional themes that represent the Bathtub as well as apocalyptic set of chords.

== Reception ==
Sean Wilson of MFiles listed the soundtrack of Beasts of the Southern Wild in their best score of the year, writing that "Romer and Zeitlin's music never cheapens the experience or reduces it to rank sentimentality, enhancing the film without ever stooping to tired convention." IndieWire ranked it in both its year-end and decade-end lists of best film soundtracks which summarised it as "it's hard to deny that Dan Romer and Benh Zeitlin's rich and ecstatic score did much of the heavy lifting for that movie". Adam Chitwood of Collider also ranked it in the decade-end lists of best film scores, admitting that "it remains a triumphant piece of music that's emblematic of how just the right score can elevate the entire scope of your film."

== Track listing ==
Beasts of the Southern Wild (Music from the Motion Picture) track listing
No.	Title	Artist(s)	Length
1.	"Particles of the Universe"	Heartbeats	1:35
2.	"The Bathtub"	Lost Bayou Ramblers	3:37
3.	"Momma's Song"		1:11
4.	"I Think I Broke Something"		1:33
5.	"The Smallest Place"		1:40
6.	"Les Veuves de la Coulee"	Leroy "Happy Fats" Leblanc	2:38
7.	"End of the World"		1:36
8.	"Until the Water Goes Down"		1:39
9.	"Mother Nature"		1:51
10.	"The Survivors"		1:56
11.	"Particles of the Universe"	Elysian Fields	0:56
12.	"Strong Animals"		1:51
13.	"La Danse de Mardi Gras"	The Balfa Brothers	2:21
14.	"The Thing That Made You"		2:24
15.	"The Confrontation"		1:50
16.	"Death Bed"		1:01
17.	"Once There Was a Hushpuppy"		6:32
Total length:			36:11

== Accolades ==
Accolades for Beasts of the Southern Wild (Music from the Motion Picture)
Award	Date of ceremony	Category	Recipients and nominees	Outcome
7th Alliance of Women Film Journalists Award	January 7, 2013	Best Film Music Or Score	Dan Romer & Benh Zeitlin	Won
13th Black Reel Awards	February 7, 2013	Outstanding Score	Dan Romer & Behn Zeitilin	Won
23rd Chicago Film Critics Awards	December 17, 2012	Best Original Score	Dan Romer & Benh Zeitlin	Nominated
6th Houston Film Critics Awards	January 5, 2013	Best Original Score	Dan Romer & Benh Zeitlin	Nominated
9th International Film Music Critics Awards	February 21, 2013	Breakout Composer of the Year	Dan Romer & Benh Zeitlin	Nominated
38th Los Angeles Film Critics Awards	December 9, 2012	Best Music Score	Dan Romer & Benh Zeitlin	Won
17th San Diego Film Critics Society Awards	December 11, 2012	Best Score	Dan Romer & Benh Zeitlin	Nominated
17th Satellite Awards	December 16, 2012	Best Score	Dan Romer & Benh Zeitlin	Nominated
10th St. Louis Gateway Film Critics Awards	December 17, 2012	Best Score	Dan Romer & Benh Zeitlin	Nominated
10th St. Louis Gateway Film Critics Awards	December 17, 2012	Best Scene	Beasts of the Southern Wild	Nominated
11th Washington D.C. Area Film Critics Association Awards	December 10, 2012	Best Score	Dan Romer & Benh Zeitlin	Nominated
