= The Tank (theater) =

Theater company in Manhattan, New York

- The Tank's logo

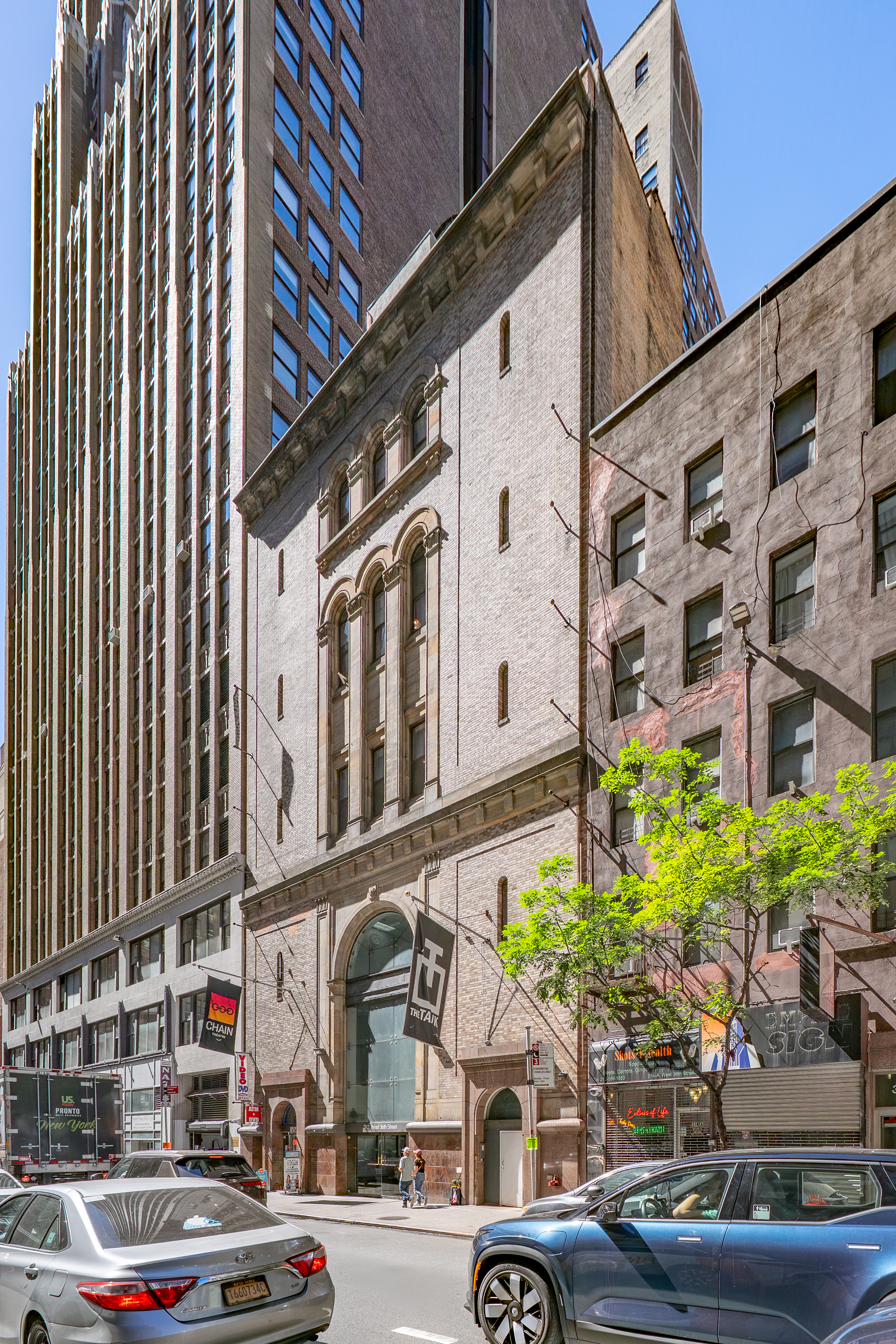
- (2026)
- Interactive map of The Tank
- Address: 312 West 36th Street, Manhattan, New York
- Coordinates: 40.753530°N 73.993261°W
- Type: Off-off-Broadway
- Events: Dance, theater, music, film, comedy

Construction
- Opened: May 2003

Website
- thetanknyc.org

The Tank is a nonprofit off-off-Broadway performance venue and producer in Manhattan, New York. The organization was founded in May 2003 by a group of young artists and has since moved several times, residing on 36th Street as of 2017. The Tank presents art across several disciplines (comedy, dance, theater, music, film), produced at no fee for use of the venue to the presenting artists.

The Tank houses two performance spaces (a 56-seat black box and a 98-seat proscenium) and five rehearsal studios. Beyond presenting work at its resident home in Manhattan, the theater has also produced shows performed elsewhere throughout New York City, collectively presenting over 1,000 performances each year. Between 2016 and 2018, five of the theater's shows were nominated for a total of six Drama Desk Awards and in 2020, the theater itself received an Obie Award for its work supporting emerging artists.

== History ==
The Tank was founded in May 2003 in Manhattan, New York, by eight artists, all recent college graduates in their mid-20s. Its founders, mostly graduates of Yale University, Oberlin College, and Harvard University, included playwright Amy Herzog, playwright and director Alex Timbers, Justin Krebs, Rachel Levy, Mike Rosenthal, and Randy Bell, who collectively expressed the goal of offering young artists across disciplines the space to create work in the center of New York City.

The organization was first housed on 42nd Street between Ninth and Tenth Avenues. It leased the space on a month-to-month basis from a landlord who intended to sell the building in which the theater was housed. Presenting "an obscure but growing lineup of indie bands, underground films, and performances ranging from comedy to puppetry", within 10 months, the company had repaid their startup loans. The theater derived its name from the architecture of its first space: three large windows overlooking 42nd Street led to someone calling the space "the Fishtank"; later the "Fish" was dropped in favor of the shortened "the Tank". On opening night The Tank hosted a show and put out a Craigslist post looking for electronic musicians, one of those was chiptune musician Bit Shifter. Soon after, The Tank would become a staple for the New York chiptune scene similar to how CBGB was for punk rock and new wave bands.

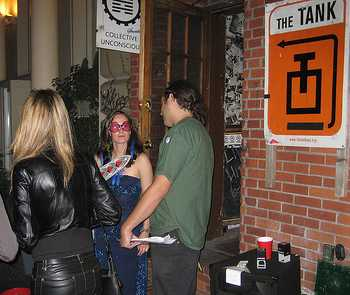
The Tank's Church Street space in 2008

By 2006, the company had moved twice and by 2007, it had won an unsolicited grant of $10,000 from the Carnegie Corporation of New York and was receiving money from the Lower Manhattan Cultural Council. The Tank's third location, into which it moved in 2006, was on Church Street in the Tribeca neighborhood, where the organization shared space with Collective:Unconscious as late as 2008. The Tank, along with 8bitpeoples, would host the 2006 Blip Festival, a chiptune festival with musical performances, workshops, and screenings of movies. However Blip Festival would change venues after. By 2010, the Tank had returned to Manhattan's midtown Theater District, occupying the Davenport Theatre on 45th Street between Eighth and Ninth Avenues.

The Tank had moved to the Playroom Theater on 46th Street by 2013, where it resided until 2017. That year, the company signed a ten-year, $18,000/month lease on and moved to a two-stage venue on 36th Street, the former home of Abingdon Theatre Company, with one 56-seat black box theater and one 98-seat proscenium theater. The Chain Theater, Workshop Theater, and the Barrow Group also resided in the same building as the Tank at the time of its arrival. The Tank's move coincided with the relocations of several other New York City theaters in mid-2017, including the Flea Theater and the Chocolate Factory.

In 2020, during the COVID-19 pandemic, the Tank laid off most of its staff and suspended programming beginning March 13, canceling over 273 performances for an estimated loss of at least $50,000. The theater went into arrears on its rent for two months before beginning to repay its landlord. While the space was closed, the theater launched a digital arts livestream called CyberTank. By July 2021, the theater was again presenting live in-person programming as well as site-specific and outdoor works. The opened a rehearsal space, The Attic, on the sixth floor of its 36th Street building in 2022.

As of 2025, The Tank's artistic directors are Meghan Finn and Johnny G. Lloyd, and its managing producer is Molly FitzMaurice.

== Operations ==
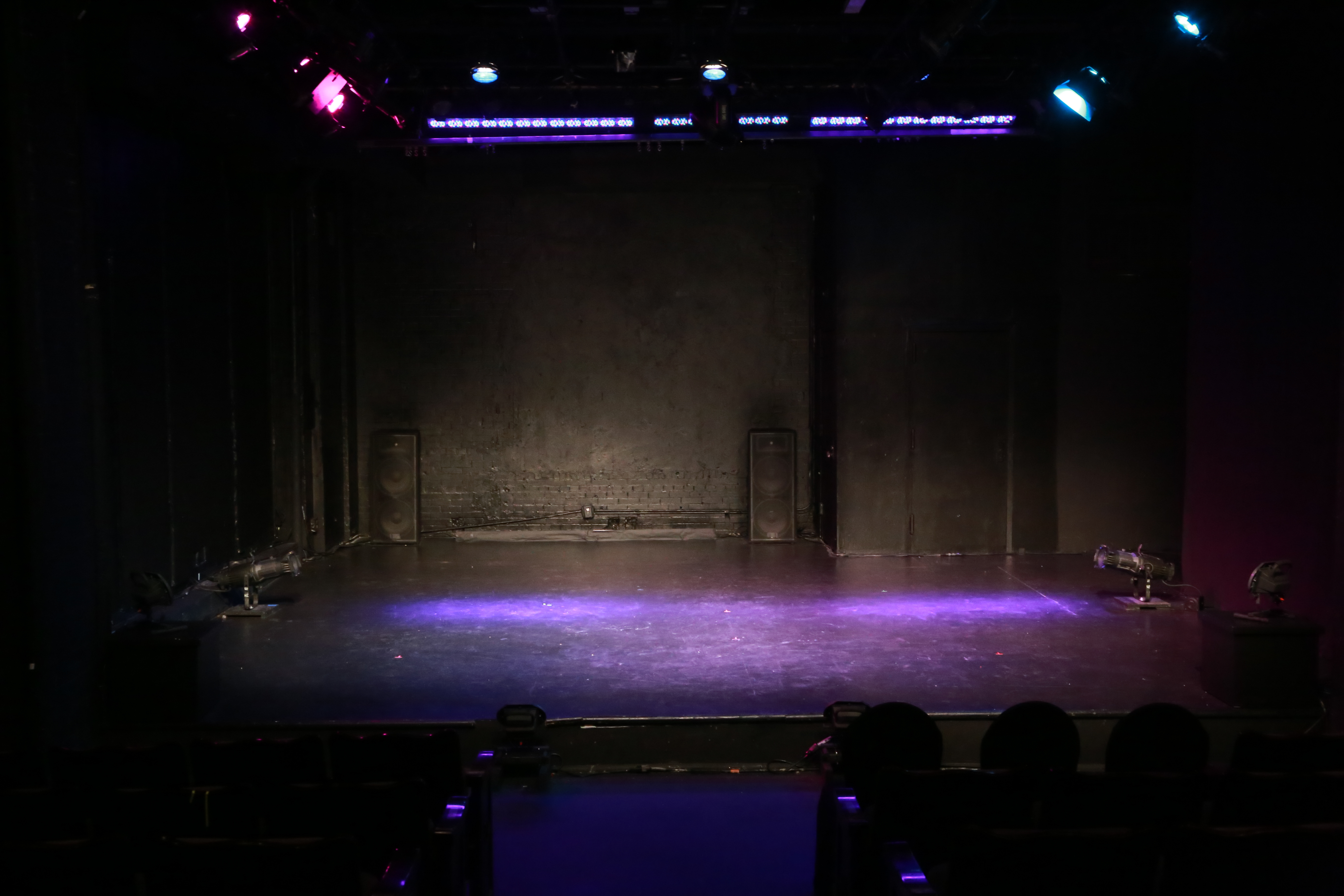
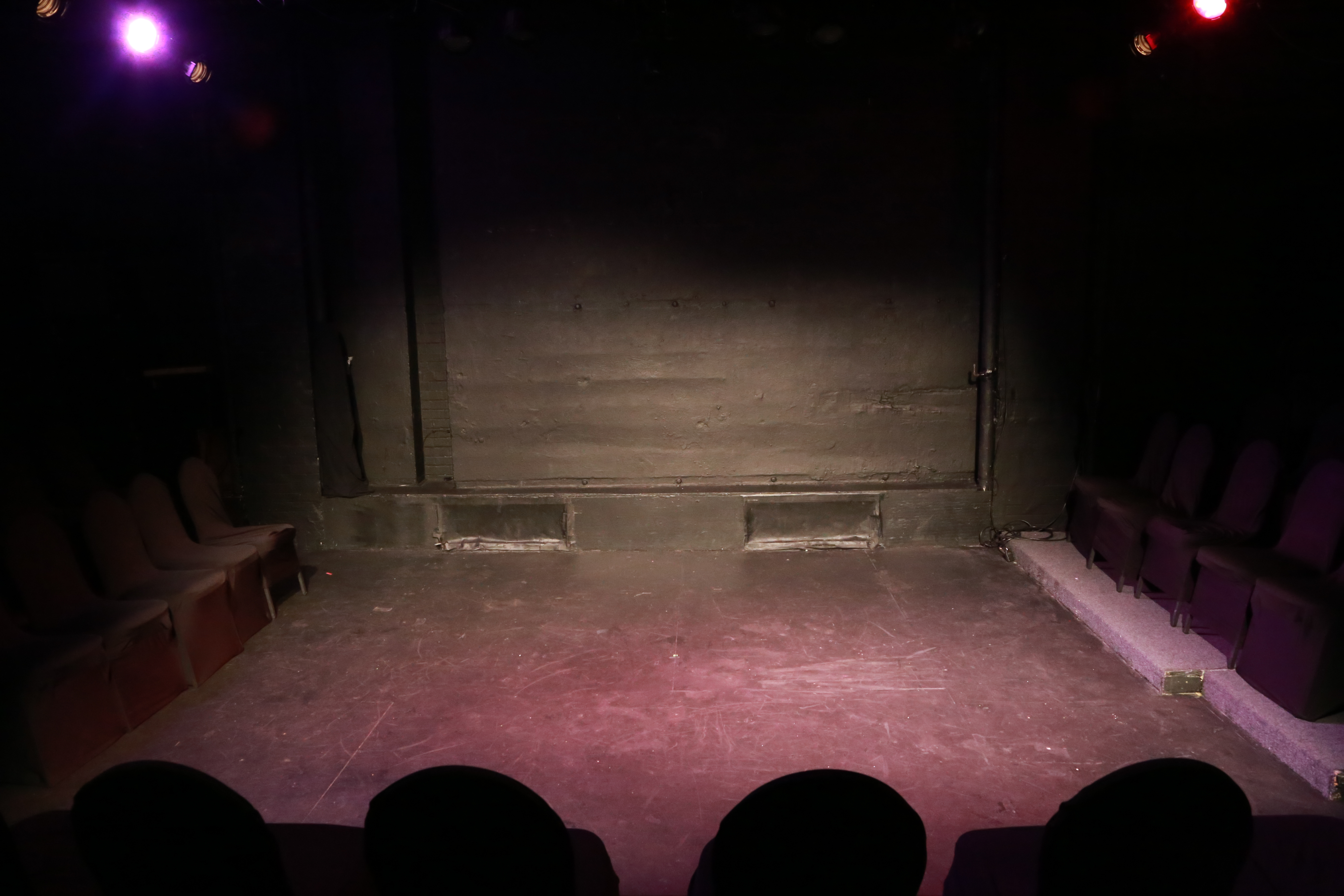
The Tank's 98-seat proscenium stage (left) and 56-seat blackbox (right)

Categorized as an off-off-Broadway venue, the Tank presents more than 1,000 performances each year across several disciplines, including dance, music, theater, comedy, and film. Artists do not pay to use the venue and are paid a portion of the ticket sales, a practice made sustainable by surplus value generated by better-selling shows. The Tank also provides free rehearsal space at its five Attic rehearsal studios for productions. As a nonprofit producer, the organization relies heavily on volunteers. Most days, the Tank runs multiple shows in a single night. The theater reported serving over 36,000 patrons, working with 2,500 artists, and operating on an $815,000 budget annually in 2020.

In addition to presenting shows at its 36th Street location, artists have also produced pieces with the Tank at other venues in New York City, such as the 3LD Art and Technology Center in Lower Manhattan and Standard ToyKraft in Williamsburg, Brooklyn. The theater runs several festivals each summer, including LimeFest, (Note: LimeFest was formerly called LadyFest.) PrideFest, TrashFest, and DarkFest, the latter of which requires performers to create shows using no stage lighting.

== Reception ==
The Village Voice listed the Tank in its Best of NYC poll in 2004, describing the theater as the city's "Best Broadway theater turned hipster hangout". In 2020, Time Out New York described the Tank as "one of NYC's premiere incubators of emerging talent".

A Very Merry Unauthorized Children's Scientology Pageant, which premiered at the Tank in 2003, received an Obie Award special citation in 2004. In 2007, Lucy Alibar's Juicy and Delicious, which would later be adapted into the film Beasts of the Southern Wild, had its world premiere at the Tank. Alibar's screenplay would go on to be nominated for the Academy Award for Best Adapted Screenplay. The Tank has received six Drama Desk Award nominations. Two shows, ADA/AVA and YOUARENOWHERE, were nominated in 2016, and another two, the ephemera trilogy and The Paper Hat Game, were nominated in 2017, all in the category of Unique Theatrical Experience. In 2018, Sinking Ship Productions' A Hunger Artist received two nominations: Outstanding Solo Performance and Outstanding Puppet Design. The Tank received an Obie Award in 2020 for its work supporting emerging artists.
