= List of accolades received by Beasts of the Southern Wild =

Beasts of the Southern Wild is a 2012 American fantasy drama film directed by Benh Zeitlin, written by Zeitlin and Lucy Alibar, and produced by Dan Janvey, Josh Penn and Michael Gottwald from Alibar's one-act play Juicy and Delicious. The film won the Caméra d'Or award at the 2012 Cannes Film Festival after competing in the Un Certain Regard section. It also won the Grand Jury Prize: Dramatic at the 2012 Sundance Film Festival, where it premiered, and the Grand Jury Prize at the 2012 Deauville American Film Festival. The film went on to earn the Los Angeles Film Festival's Audience Award for Best Narrative Feature and the Seattle International Film Festival's Golden Space Needle Award for Best Director. In October, it was announced that the film had won the Sutherland Trophy for Most Innovative Debut. On January 10, 2013, the film was nominated for four Oscars, in the categories of Best Picture, Best Director (Benh Zeitlin), Lead Actress (Quvenzhané Wallis), and Adapted Screenplay (Lucy Alibar & Benh Zeitlin).

List of awards and nominations
Award	Date of ceremony	Category	Recipients and nominees	Outcome
85th Academy Awards	February 24, 2013	Best Picture	Dan Janvey, Josh Penn and Michael Gottwald	Nominated
85th Academy Awards	February 24, 2013	Best Director	Benh Zeitlin	Nominated
85th Academy Awards	February 24, 2013	Best Actress	Quvenzhané Wallis	Nominated
85th Academy Awards	February 24, 2013	Best Adapted Screenplay	Lucy Alibar and Benh Zeitlin	Nominated
13th AFI Awards	December 10, 2012	Top 10 Films	Beasts of the Southern Wild	Won
10th African-American Film Critics Awards	February 8, 2012	Top 10 Films	Beasts of the Southern Wild	Won
10th African-American Film Critics Awards	February 8, 2012	Best Breakout Performance	Quvenzhané Wallis	Won
2012 Ray Bradbury Award for Outstanding Dramatic Presentation	May 18, 2013	Screenwriting	Benh Zeitlin (director), Benh Zeitlin and Lucy Abilar (writers)	Won
7th Alliance of Women Film Journalists Award	January 7, 2013	Top 10 Films	Beasts of the Southern Wild	Won
7th Alliance of Women Film Journalists Award	January 7, 2013	Best Breakthrough Performance	Quvenzhané Wallis	Won
7th Alliance of Women Film Journalists Award	January 7, 2013	Best Woman Screenwriter	Lucy Alibar	Won
7th Alliance of Women Film Journalists Award	January 7, 2013	Best Film Music Or Score	Dan Romer & Benh Zeitlin	Won
8th Austin Film Critics Awards	December 18, 2012	Top 10 Films	Beasts of the Southern Wild	Won
8th Austin Film Critics Awards	December 18, 2012	Best First Film	Benh Zeitlin	Won
8th Austin Film Critics Awards	December 18, 2012	Best Breakthrough Artist	Quvenzhané Wallis	Won
6th Australian Film Critics Awards	February 23, 2013	Best International Film (English Language)	Beasts of the Southern Wild	Nominated
59th Belgian Film Critics Association Award	January 5, 2013	Grand Prix	Beasts of the Southern Wild	Won
13th Black Reel Awards	February 7, 2013	Outstanding Motion Picture	Beasts of the Southern Wild	Won
13th Black Reel Awards	February 7, 2013	Outstanding Actress	Quvenzhané Wallis	Won
13th Black Reel Awards	February 7, 2013	Outstanding Breakthrough Performance	Quvenzhané Wallis	Won
13th Black Reel Awards	February 7, 2013	Outstanding Score	Dan Romer & Behn Zeitilin	Won
13th Black Reel Awards	February 7, 2013	Outstanding Supporting Actor	Dwight Henry	Nominated
Bodil Awards	February 1, 2014	Best US Feature	Benh Zeitlin	Won
66th British Academy Film Awards	February 10, 2013	Best Adapted Screenplay	Lucy Alibar & Benh Zeitlin	Nominated
2012 British Film Institute	December 1, 2012	Top 10 Films	Beasts of the Southern Wild	Won
56th British Film Institute Award	October 20, 2012	Sutherland Award	Benh Zeitlin	Won
65th Cannes Film Festival	May 16, 2012	Caméra d'Or	Benh Zeitlin	Won
65th Cannes Film Festival	May 16, 2012	FIPRESCI Prize	Benh Zeitlin	Won
65th Cannes Film Festival	May 16, 2012	Prix Regards Jeune	Benh Zeitlin	Won
65th Cannes Film Festival	May 16, 2012	Prize of the Ecumenical Jury	Benh Zeitlin	Won
23rd Chicago Film Critics Awards	December 17, 2012	Most Promising Performer		Won
23rd Chicago Film Critics Awards	December 17, 2012	Most Promising Filmmaker	Benh Zeitlin	Won
23rd Chicago Film Critics Awards	December 17, 2012	Best Picture	Beasts of the Southern Wild	Nominated
23rd Chicago Film Critics Awards	December 17, 2012	Best Director	Benh Zeitlin	Nominated
23rd Chicago Film Critics Awards	December 17, 2012	Best Actress	Quvenzhané Wallis	Nominated
23rd Chicago Film Critics Awards	December 17, 2012	Best Supporting Actor	Dwight Henry	Nominated
23rd Chicago Film Critics Awards	December 17, 2012	Best Adapted Screenplay	Lucy Alibar & Benh Zeitlin	Nominated
23rd Chicago Film Critics Awards	December 17, 2012	Best Original Score	Dan Romer & Benh Zeitlin	Nominated
15th Costume Designers Guild Awards	February 19, 2013	Excellence in Contemporary Film	Stephani Lewis	Nominated
18th Critics' Choice Awards	January 10, 2013	Best Picture	Beasts of the Southern Wild	Nominated
18th Critics' Choice Awards	January 10, 2013	Best Actress	Quvenzhané Wallis	Nominated
18th Critics' Choice Awards	January 10, 2013	Best Young Actor/Actress	Quvenzhané Wallis	Won
19th Dallas-Fort Worth Film Critics Awards	December 18, 2012	Best Picture	Beasts of the Southern Wild	Nominated
19th Dallas-Fort Worth Film Critics Awards	December 18, 2012	Best Actress	Quvenzhané Wallis	Nominated
19th Dallas-Fort Worth Film Critics Awards	December 18, 2012	Best Low-Budget/Cutting-Edge Independent Film	Beasts of the Southern Wild	Won
38th Deauville American Film Festival	September 8, 2012	Best Film	Beasts of the Southern Wild	Won
38th Deauville American Film Festival	September 8, 2012	The Most Promising Newcomer Award	Benh Zeitlin	Won
6th Detroit Film Critics Society Awards	December 14, 2012	Best Breakthrough Performance	Benh Zeitlin	Nominated
2013 Dorian Awards	January 16, 2013	Film of the Year	Beasts of the Southern Wild	Nominated
33rd Durban International Film Festival Awards	July 19–29, 2012	Best Director	Benh Zeitlin	Won
40th Evening Standard British Film Awards	February 15, 2013	London Film Museum Award for Technical Achievement	Ben Richardson	Nominated
11th Expresión en Corto International Film Festival	July 24–28, 2012	Best International First Feature	Benh Zeitlin	Won
28th Film Independent's Spirit Awards	February 23, 2013	Best Cinematography	Ben Richardson	Won
28th Film Independent's Spirit Awards	February 23, 2013	Best Film	Beasts of the Southern Wild	Nominated
28th Film Independent's Spirit Awards	February 23, 2013	Best Director	Benh Zeitlin	Nominated
28th Film Independent's Spirit Awards	February 23, 2013	Best Female Lead Actress	Quvenzhané Wallis	Nominated
17th Florida Film Critics Circle Awards	December 18, 2012	Pauline Kael Breakout Award	Quvenzhané Wallis	Won
39th Ghent International Film Festival	October 9–20, 2012	Youth Jury Award	Benh Zeitlin	Won
60th Golden Reel Awards	February 17, 2013	Best Sound Editing - Dialogue and ADR in a Feature Film	Beasts of the Southern Wild	Nominated
22nd Gotham Awards	November 26, 2012	Breakthrough Actor/Actress	Quvenzhané Wallis	Nominated
22nd Gotham Awards	November 26, 2012	Breakthrough Director	Benh Zeitlin	Won
22nd Gotham Awards	November 26, 2012	Audience Award	Beasts of the Southern Wild	Nominated
16th Hollywood Film Festival	October 21, 2012	New Hollywood Award	Quvenzhané Wallis	Won
6th Houston Film Critics Awards	January 5, 2013	Best Picture	Beasts of the Southern Wild	Nominated
6th Houston Film Critics Awards	January 5, 2013	Best Actress	Quvenzhané Wallis	Nominated
6th Houston Film Critics Awards	January 5, 2013	Best Original Score	Dan Romer & Benh Zeitlin	Nominated
38th Humanitas Prize	September 14, 2012	Sundance Feature Film Category	Benh Zeitlin and Lucy Alibar	Won
20th International Film Festival of the Art of Cinematography Plus Camerimage	Nov 24 – December 1, 2012	Best Cinematography	Ben Richardson	Nominated
9th International Film Music Critics Awards	February 21, 2013	Breakout Composer of the Year	Dan Romer & Benh Zeitlin	Nominated
38th Los Angeles Film Critics Awards	December 9, 2012	Best Supporting Actor	Dwight Henry	Won
38th Los Angeles Film Critics Awards	December 9, 2012	Best Music Score	Dan Romer & Benh Zeitlin	Won
38th Los Angeles Film Festival	June 14–24, 2012	Best Narrative Feature	Beasts of the Southern Wild	Won
33rd London Film Critics Circle Awards	January 20, 2013	Film of the Year	Beasts of the Southern Wild	Nominated
33rd London Film Critics Circle Awards	January 20, 2013	Technical Achievement	Ben Richardson	Nominated
44th NAACP Image Awards	February 1, 2013	Outstanding Motion Picture	Beasts of the Southern Wild	Nominated
44th NAACP Image Awards	February 1, 2013	Outstanding Independent Motion Picture	Beasts of the Southern Wild	Won
44th NAACP Image Awards	February 1, 2013	Outstanding Actress in a Motion Picture	Quvenzhané Wallis	Nominated
44th NAACP Image Awards	February 1, 2013	Outstanding Supporting Actor in a Motion Picture	Dwight Henry	Nominated
17th Nantucket Film Festival	Junio 23, 2012	Best New Voices in Screenwriting	Lucy Alibar & Benh Zeitlin	Won
84th National Board Of Review Awards	January 10, 2013	Best Directorial Debut	Benh Zeitlin	Won
84th National Board Of Review Awards	January 10, 2013	Breakthrough Actress	Quvenzhané Wallis	Won
78th New York Film Critics Circle Awards	December 3, 2012	Best First Film	Beasts of the Southern Wild	Nominated
12th New York Film Critics Online Awards	December 9, 2012	Top 10 Films	Beasts of the Southern Wild	Won
12th New York Film Critics Online Awards	December 9, 2012	Best Debut Director	Benh Zeitlin	Won
12th New York Film Critics Online Awards	December 9, 2012	Best Breakthrough Performer	Quvenzhané Wallis	Won
16th Online Film Critics Society Awards	January 7, 2012	Best Actress	Quvenzhané Wallis	Nominated
16th Online Film Critics Society Awards	January 7, 2012	Best Supporting Actor	Dwight Henry	Nominated
16th Online Film Critics Society Awards	January 7, 2012	Best Adapted Screenplay	Lucy Alibar & Benh Zeitlin	Nominated
24th Producers Guild of America Awards	January 26, 2013	Best Production in a Theatrical Picture	Michael Gottwald, Dan Janvey & Josh Penn	Nominated
9th Reykjavík International Film Festival	Sep 27 – October 7, 2012	Best Film	Beasts of the Southern Wild	Won
17th San Diego Film Critics Society Awards	December 11, 2012	Best Cinematography	Ben Richardson	Nominated
17th San Diego Film Critics Society Awards	December 11, 2012	Best Score	Dan Romer & Benh Zeitlin	Nominated
28th Santa Barbara International Film Festival Awards	January 29, 2013	Virtuoso Award	Quvenzhané Wallis	Won
17th Satellite Awards	December 16, 2012	Humanitarian Award	Benh Zeitlin	Won
17th Satellite Awards	December 16, 2012	Newcomer Award	Quvenzhané Wallis	Won
17th Satellite Awards	December 16, 2012	Best Picture	Beasts of the Southern Wild	Nominated
17th Satellite Awards	December 16, 2012	Best Cinematography	Ben Richardson	Nominated
17th Satellite Awards	December 16, 2012	Best Score	Dan Romer & Benh Zeitlin	Nominated
39th Saturn Awards	June 2013	Best Performance by a Younger Actor/Actress	Quvenzhané Wallis	Nominated
28th Seattle International Film Festival	June 15–21, 2012	Best Director	Benh Zeitlin	Won
1st Smithsonian's American Ingenuity Awards	November 28, 2012	Visual Arts	Benh Zeitlin	Won
10th St. Louis Gateway Film Critics Awards	December 17, 2012	Best Director	Benh Zeitlin	Nominated
10th St. Louis Gateway Film Critics Awards	December 17, 2012	Best Actress	Quvenzhané Wallis	Nominated
10th St. Louis Gateway Film Critics Awards	December 17, 2012	Best Adapted Screenplay	Lucy Alibar & Benh Zeitlin	Nominated
10th St. Louis Gateway Film Critics Awards	December 17, 2012	Best Cinematography	Ben Richardson	Nominated
10th St. Louis Gateway Film Critics Awards	December 17, 2012	Best Score	Dan Romer & Benh Zeitlin	Nominated
10th St. Louis Gateway Film Critics Awards	December 17, 2012	Best Scene	Beasts of the Southern Wild	Nominated
28th Sundance Film Festival	January 19–29, 2012	Dramatic Grand Jury Prize	Beasts of the Southern Wild	Won
28th Sundance Film Festival	January 19–29, 2012	Dramatic Excellence in Cinematography	Ben Richardson	Won
59th Sydney Film Festival	June 6–17, 2012	Official Competition	Beasts of the Southern Wild	Nominated
2012 The Atlantic Review	December 17, 2012	Top 10 Films	Beasts of the Southern Wild	Won
2012 The Atlantic Review	December 17, 2012	Big Things Come in Small Packages Award	Beasts of the Southern Wild	Won
2012 The Globe and Mail Review	December 14, 2012	Top 10 Films	Beasts of the Southern Wild	Won
2012 The Village Voice Poll	December 19, 2012	Best First Feature	Beasts of the Southern Wild	Won
2012 The Village Voice Poll	December 19, 2012	Best Actress	Quvenzhané Wallis	Won
2012 The Village Voice Poll	December 19, 2012	Best Breakthrough Performance	Quvenzhané Wallis	Won
16th Toronto Film Critics Association Awards	January 8, 2013	Best First Feature	Beasts of the Southern Wild	Won
25th USC Scripter Awards	February 9, 2013	Best Screenwriters	Lucy Alibar & Benh Zeitlin	Nominated
11th WDCAFCA Awards	December 10, 2012	Best Youth Performance	Quvenzhané Wallis	Won
11th WDCAFCA Awards	December 10, 2012	Best Score	Dan Romer & Benh Zeitlin	Nominated
9th Women Film Critics Circle Awards	January 1, 2013	Best Youth Performance	Quvenzhané Wallis	Won
34th Young Artist Awards	May 5, 2013	Best Performance in a Feature Film - Leading Young Actress	Quvenzhané Wallis	Won
