= List of accolades received by Silver Linings Playbook =

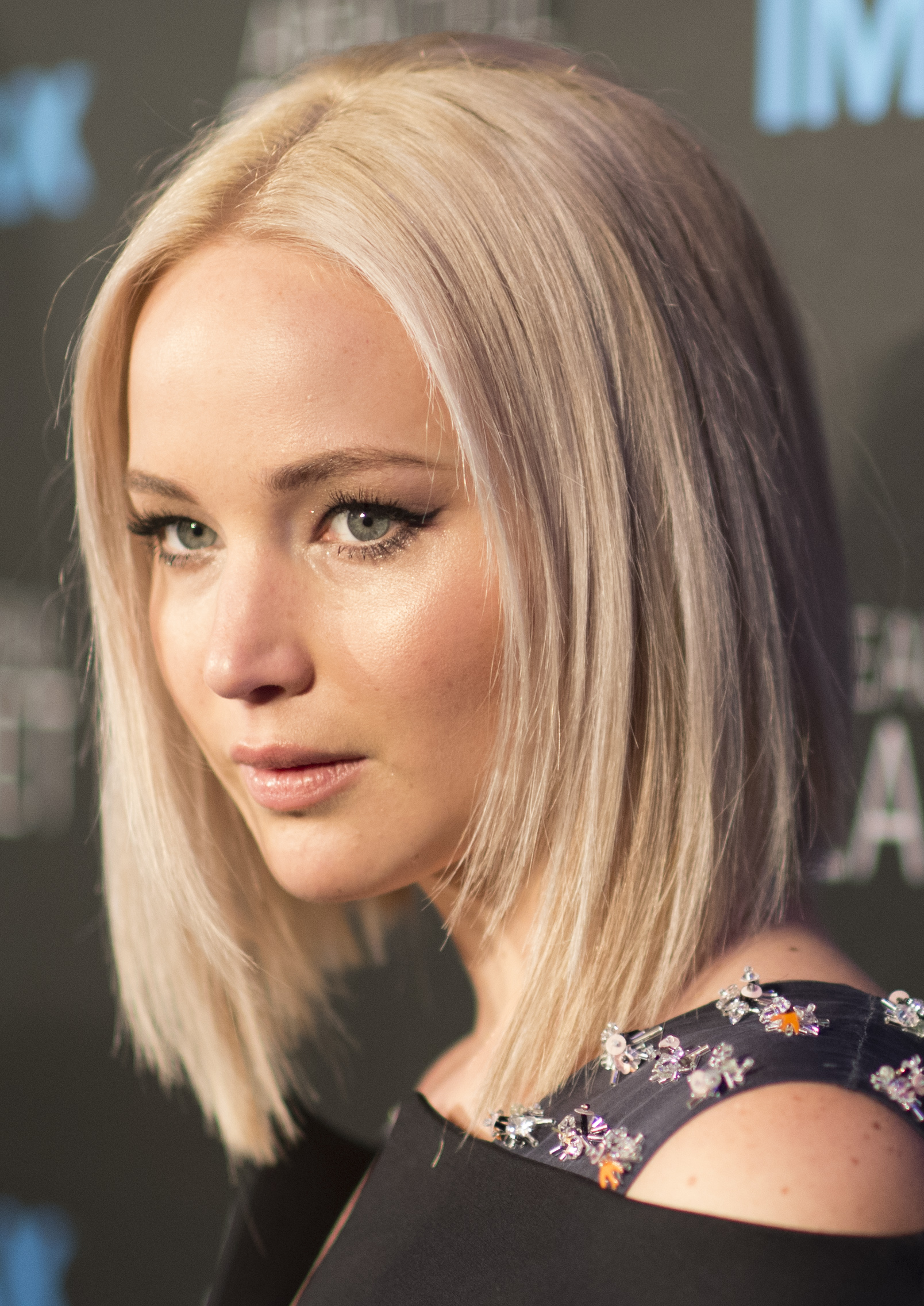
- Jennifer Lawrence received several accolades for her performance in the film.
Accolades
Award	Won	Nominated
AACTA Awards	5	7
Academy Awards	1	8
American Film Institute	1	1
Austin Film Festival	1	1
British Academy Film Awards	1	3
Critics' Choice Movie Awards	4	10
Detroit Film Critics Society Awards	5	7
Golden Globe Awards	1	3
Gotham Awards	0	1
Grammy Awards	0	1
Hamptons International Film Festival	1	1
Hollywood Film Festival	3	3
Houston Film Critics Society	1	1
Independent Spirit Awards	4	5
International Film Music Critics Association	1	2
Los Angeles Film Critics Association	1	1
MTV Movie Awards	3	5
National Board of Review	2	2
National Society of Film Critics	2	2
Producers Guild of America	0	1
San Diego Film Critics Society	0	6
Satellite Awards	5	7
Santa Barbara International Film Festival	1	1
Screen Actors Guild Awards	1	4
St. Louis Film Critics Association	1	3
Toronto International Film Festival	1	1
Washington D.C. Area Film Critics Association	1	3
- Total number of awards and nominations (Note: Certain award groups do not simply award one winner. They recognize several different recipients and have runners-up. Since this is a specific recognition and is different from losing an award, runner-up mentions are considered wins in this award tally.)
Totals	47	91
- References

Silver Linings Playbook is a 2012 American romantic comedy-drama film directed by David O. Russell. An adaptation of the novel of same name by Matthew Quick, the film stars Bradley Cooper and Jennifer Lawrence, with Robert De Niro, Jacki Weaver, Chris Tucker, Anupam Kher, John Ortiz and Julia Stiles in supporting roles. The film tells the story of, Patrizio "Pat" Solitano Jr. (Cooper), a man with bipolar disorder who finds companionship in a young widow, Tiffany Maxwell (Lawrence).

Silver Linings Playbook premiered at the 2012 Toronto International Film Festival on September 8, 2012, where Russell won the People's Choice Award. The film initially received a limited release in the United States on November 16, 2012. The Weinstein Company later gave the film a wider release at over 700 theaters on December 25. Silver Linings Playbook earned a worldwide total of over $236 million on a production budget of $21 million. Rotten Tomatoes, a review aggregator, surveyed 228 reviews and judged 92 percent to be positive.

Silver Linings Playbook received awards and nominations in a variety of categories with particular praise for its direction, screenplay, and the performances of Cooper, Lawrence, De Niro and Weaver. As of 2013, it has received a total of 47 awards from 91 nominations. At the 85th Academy Awards, the film received eight nominations, and won Best Actress (Lawrence). At the same ceremony, it became the first film in 31 years to be nominated in all four acting categories. At the 66th British Academy Film Awards, Russell won the Best Adapted Screenplay award. The film was nominated for four awards at the 70th Golden Globe Awards, going on to win one—Best Actress in a Comedy or Musical. Among other honors, Silver Linings Playbook was named Best Film at the AACTA Awards, Detroit Film Critics Society, Film Independent Spirit Awards, and Satellite Awards. It also received a Grammy Award for Best Song Written for Visual Media nomination for the song "Silver Lining (Crazy 'Bout You)".

== Accolades ==
Award	Date of ceremony	Category	Recipient(s)	Result	Ref(s)
AACTA Awards	January 26, 2013	Best International Film	Bruce Cohen, Donna Gigliotti and Jonathan Gordon	Won	
AACTA Awards	January 26, 2013	Best International Direction	David O. Russell	Won	
AACTA Awards	January 26, 2013	Best International Screenplay	David O. Russell	Nominated	
AACTA Awards	January 26, 2013	Best International Actor	Bradley Cooper	Nominated	
AACTA Awards	January 26, 2013	Best International Actress	Jennifer Lawrence	Won	
AACTA Awards	January 26, 2013	Best International Supporting Actor	Robert De Niro	Won	
AACTA Awards	January 26, 2013	Best International Supporting Actress	Jacki Weaver	Won	
Academy Awards	February 24, 2013	Best Picture	Bruce Cohen, Donna Gigliotti and Jonathan Gordon	Nominated	
Academy Awards	February 24, 2013	Best Director	David O. Russell	Nominated	
Academy Awards	February 24, 2013	Best Actor	Bradley Cooper	Nominated	
Academy Awards	February 24, 2013	Best Actress	Jennifer Lawrence	Won	
Academy Awards	February 24, 2013	Best Supporting Actor	Robert De Niro	Nominated	
Academy Awards	February 24, 2013	Best Supporting Actress	Jacki Weaver	Nominated	
Academy Awards	February 24, 2013	Best Adapted Screenplay	David O. Russell	Nominated	
Academy Awards	February 24, 2013	Best Film Editing	Jay Cassidy and Crispin Struthers	Nominated	
American Film Institute	January 11, 2013	AFI Movies of the Year	Silver Linings Playbook	Won	
Austin Film Festival	October 18–25, 2012	Audience Award – Marquee Feature	David O. Russell	Won	
British Academy Film Awards	February 10, 2013	Best Actor	Bradley Cooper	Nominated	
British Academy Film Awards	February 10, 2013	Best Actress	Jennifer Lawrence	Nominated	
British Academy Film Awards	February 10, 2013	Best Adapted Screenplay	David O. Russell	Won	
Critics' Choice Movie Awards	January 10, 2013	Best Picture	Silver Linings Playbook	Nominated	
Critics' Choice Movie Awards	January 10, 2013	Best Comedy	Silver Linings Playbook	Won	
Critics' Choice Movie Awards	January 10, 2013	Best Director	David O. Russell	Nominated	
Critics' Choice Movie Awards	January 10, 2013	Best Actor	Bradley Cooper	Nominated	
Critics' Choice Movie Awards	January 10, 2013	Best Actor in a Comedy	Bradley Cooper	Won	
Critics' Choice Movie Awards	January 10, 2013	Best Actress	Jennifer Lawrence	Nominated	
Critics' Choice Movie Awards	January 10, 2013	Best Actress in a Comedy	Jennifer Lawrence	Won	
Critics' Choice Movie Awards	January 10, 2013	Best Supporting Actor	Robert De Niro	Nominated	
Critics' Choice Movie Awards	January 10, 2013	Best Acting Ensemble	Silver Linings Playbook	Won	
Critics' Choice Movie Awards	January 10, 2013	Best Adapted Screenplay	David O. Russell	Nominated	
Detroit Film Critics Society	December 14, 2012	Best Film	Silver Linings Playbook	Won	
Detroit Film Critics Society	December 14, 2012	Best Director	David O. Russell	Won	
Detroit Film Critics Society	December 14, 2012	Best Actor	Bradley Cooper	Nominated	
Detroit Film Critics Society	December 14, 2012	Best Actress	Jennifer Lawrence	Won	
Detroit Film Critics Society	December 14, 2012	Best Supporting Actor	Robert De Niro	Won	
Detroit Film Critics Society	December 14, 2012	Best Ensemble	Silver Linings Playbook	Nominated	
Detroit Film Critics Society	December 14, 2012	Best Screenplay	David O. Russell	Won	
Golden Globe Awards	January 13, 2013	Best Motion Picture – Musical or Comedy	Silver Linings Playbook	Nominated	
Golden Globe Awards	January 13, 2013	Best Actor – Motion Picture Musical or Comedy	Bradley Cooper	Nominated	
Golden Globe Awards	January 13, 2013	Best Actress – Motion Picture Musical or Comedy	Jennifer Lawrence	Won	
Golden Globe Awards	January 13, 2013	Best Screenplay	David O. Russell	Nominated	
Gotham Awards	November 26, 2012	Best Ensemble Performance	Silver Linings Playbook	Nominated	
Grammy Awards	January 26, 2014	Best Song Written for Visual Media	Jessie J and Diane Warren (for "Silver Lining (Crazy 'Bout You)")	Nominated	
Hamptons International Film Festival	October 7, 2012	Audience Award – Best Narrative Feature	David O. Russell	Won	
Hollywood Film Festival	October 22, 2012	Director of the Year	David O. Russell	Won	
Hollywood Film Festival	October 22, 2012	Actor of the Year	Bradley Cooper	Won	
Hollywood Film Festival	October 22, 2012	Supporting Actor of the Year	Robert De Niro	Won	
Houston Film Critics Society	January 5, 2013	Best Actress	Jennifer Lawrence	Won	
Independent Spirit Awards	February 23, 2013	Best Film	David O. Russell	Won	
Independent Spirit Awards	February 23, 2013	Best Director	David O. Russell	Won	
Independent Spirit Awards	February 23, 2013	Best Male Lead	Bradley Cooper	Nominated	
Independent Spirit Awards	February 23, 2013	Best Female Lead	Jennifer Lawrence	Won	
Independent Spirit Awards	February 23, 2013	Best Screenplay	David O. Russell	Won	
International Film Music Critics Association	February 21, 2013	Film Composer of the Year	Danny Elfman (also for Dark Shadows, Frankenweenie, Men in Black 3, Hitchcock and Promised Land)	Won	
International Film Music Critics Association	February 21, 2013	Best Original Score for a Comedy Film	Danny Elfman	Nominated	
Los Angeles Film Critics Association	December 9, 2012	Best Actress	Jennifer Lawrence	Won	
MTV Movie Awards	April 14, 2013	Movie of the Year	Silver Linings Playbook	Nominated	
MTV Movie Awards	April 14, 2013	Best Male Performance	Bradley Cooper	Won	
MTV Movie Awards	April 14, 2013	Best Female Performance	Jennifer Lawrence	Won	
MTV Movie Awards	April 14, 2013	Best Kiss	Bradley Cooper and Jennifer Lawrence	Won	
MTV Movie Awards	April 14, 2013	Best Musical Moment	Bradley Cooper and Jennifer Lawrence	Nominated	
National Board of Review	December 5, 2012	Best Actor	Bradley Cooper	Won	
National Board of Review	December 5, 2012	Best Adapted Screenplay	David O. Russell	Won	
National Society of Film Critics	January 5, 2013	Best Actress	Jennifer Lawrence	Runner-up	
National Society of Film Critics	January 5, 2013	Best Screenplay	David O. Russell	3rd Place	
Producers Guild of America	January 26, 2013	Best Theatrical Motion Picture	Bruce Cohen, Donna Gigliotti and Jonathan Gordon	Nominated	
San Diego Film Critics Society	December 11, 2012	Best Film	Silver Linings Playbook	Nominated	
San Diego Film Critics Society	December 11, 2012	Best Director	David O. Russell	Nominated	
San Diego Film Critics Society	December 11, 2012	Best Actor	Bradley Cooper	Nominated	
San Diego Film Critics Society	December 11, 2012	Best Actress	Jennifer Lawrence	Nominated	
San Diego Film Critics Society	December 11, 2012	Best Performance by an Ensemble	Silver Linings Playbook	Nominated	
San Diego Film Critics Society	December 11, 2012	Best Adapted Screenplay	David O. Russell	Nominated	
Satellite Awards	December 16, 2012	Best Film	Silver Linings Playbook	Won	
Satellite Awards	December 16, 2012	Best Director	David O. Russell	Won	
Satellite Awards	December 16, 2012	Best Actor – Motion Picture	Bradley Cooper	Won	
Satellite Awards	December 16, 2012	Best Actress – Motion Picture	Jennifer Lawrence	Won	
Satellite Awards	December 16, 2012	Best Supporting Actor – Motion Picture	Robert De Niro	Nominated	
Satellite Awards	December 16, 2012	Best Adapted Screenplay	David O. Russell	Nominated	
Satellite Awards	December 16, 2012	Best Editing	Jay Cassidy and Crispin Struthers	Won	
Santa Barbara International Film Festival	January 24 – February 3, 2013	Outstanding Performer of the Year	Jennifer Lawrence	Won	
Screen Actors Guild Awards	January 27, 2013	Outstanding Performance by a Male Actor in a Leading Role	Bradley Cooper	Nominated	
Screen Actors Guild Awards	January 27, 2013	Outstanding Performance by a Female Actor in a Leading Role	Jennifer Lawrence	Won	
Screen Actors Guild Awards	January 27, 2013	Outstanding Performance by a Male Actor in a Supporting Role	Robert De Niro	Nominated	
Screen Actors Guild Awards	January 27, 2013	Best Performance by a Cast in a Motion Picture	Silver Linings Playbook	Nominated	
St. Louis Film Critics Association	December 17, 2012	Best Actor	Bradley Cooper	Nominated	
St. Louis Film Critics Association	December 17, 2012	Best Actress	Jennifer Lawrence	Runner-up	
St. Louis Film Critics Association	December 17, 2012	Best Adapted Screenplay	David O. Russell	Nominated	
Toronto International Film Festival	September 6–16, 2012	People's Choice Award	David O. Russell	Won	
Washington D.C. Area Film Critics Association	December 10, 2012	Best Film	Silver Linings Playbook	Nominated	
Washington D.C. Area Film Critics Association	December 10, 2012	Best Actress	Jennifer Lawrence	Nominated	
Washington D.C. Area Film Critics Association	December 10, 2012	Best Adapted Screenplay	David O. Russell	Won	

== See also ==
- 2012 in film
