= Georgia Film Critics Association =

Association in Georgia, USA

- Formation: 2011
- Purpose: Film critics
- Location: Georgia, United States
- Members: 50+
- Website: www.georgiafilmcritics.org

The Georgia Film Critics Association (GAFCA) is an organization of professional film critics from the U.S. state of Georgia. Inclusion is open to film critics throughout the entire state of Georgia, although the majority of members are concentrated in the Metro Atlanta area. GAFCA members represent the reviewing press through online, radio, television, or print media.

== Overview ==
The Georgia Film Critics Association was founded in 2011, and is the first film critic group in the state of Georgia. As of 2023, GAFCA comprises 48 members. Awards are given annually in 17 categories. A special award, the Oglethorpe Award for Excellence in Georgia Cinema, is bestowed upon a film or short film that was produced in Georgia. The Oglethorpe Award is credited to the winning film's director and writer.

Each January, GAFCA votes on their end-of-year awards for films released in the previous calendar year. Nomination ballots are typically due on the first Saturday in January, with nominations announced the following Monday and winners announced that Friday.

In 2022, GAFCA released the runners-up alongside winners for the first time in their history.

=== Award categories ===
- Best Actor
- Best Actress
- Best Adapted Screenplay
- Best Animated Film
- Best Cinematography
- Best Director
- Best Documentary
- Best Ensemble
- Best International Film (formerly Foreign Film or Foreign Language Film)
- Best Original Score
- Best Original Screenplay
- Best Original Song
- Best Picture
- Best Production Design (formerly Art Direction)
- Best Supporting Actor
- Best Supporting Actress
- Breakthrough Award
- Oglethorpe Award for Excellence in Georgia Cinema

== Awards history ==
=== Top categories winners history ===
Year	Best Film	Best Director	Best Actor	Best Actress	Best Supporting Actor	Best Supporting Actress
2011 - 1st	The Tree of Life	Terrence Malick; The Tree of Life	Brad Pitt; Moneyball	Juliette Binoche; Certified Copy	Brad Pitt; The Tree of Life	Jessica Chastain; The Tree of Life
2012 - 2nd	Silver Linings Playbook	Kathryn Bigelow; Zero Dark Thirty	Daniel Day-Lewis; Lincoln	Jennifer Lawrence; Silver Linings Playbook	Philip Seymour Hoffman; The Master	Judi Dench; Skyfall
2013 - 3rd	Her	Alfonso Cuarón; Gravity	Chiwetel Ejiofor; 12 Years a Slave	Cate Blanchett; Blue Jasmine	Michael Fassbender; 12 Years a Slave	Lupita Nyong'o; 12 Years a Slave
2014 - 4th	Boyhood	Richard Linklater; Boyhood	Jake Gyllenhaal; Nightcrawler	Marion Cotillard; Two Days, One Night	J. K. Simmons; Whiplash	Tilda Swinton; Snowpiercer
2015 - 5th	Mad Max: Fury Road	George Miller; Mad Max: Fury Road	Leonardo DiCaprio; The Revenant	Brie Larson; Room	Sylvester Stallone; Creed	Alicia Vikander; Ex Machina
2016 - 6th	Moonlight	Damien Chazelle; La La Land	Casey Affleck; Manchester by the Sea	Natalie Portman; Jackie	Mahershala Ali; Moonlight	Viola Davis; Fences
2017 - 7th	Lady Bird	Greta Gerwig; Lady Bird	Daniel Kaluuya; Get Out	Saoirse Ronan; Lady Bird	Willem Dafoe; The Florida Project	Laurie Metcalf; Lady Bird
2018 - 8th	A Star Is Born	Alfonso Cuarón; Roma	Ethan Hawke; First Reformed	Toni Collette; Hereditary	Sam Elliott; A Star Is Born	Emma Stone; The Favourite
2019 - 9th	Parasite	Bong Joon-ho; Parasite	Adam Driver; Marriage Story	Lupita Nyong'o; Us	Joe Pesci; The Irishman	Florence Pugh; Little Women
2020 - 10th	Nomadland	Chloé Zhao; Nomadland	Riz Ahmed; Sound of Metal	Carey Mulligan; Promising Young Woman	Paul Raci; Sound of Metal	Youn Yuh-jung; Minari
2021 - 11th	Licorice Pizza	Jane Campion; The Power of the Dog	Nicolas Cage; Pig	Alana Haim; Licorice Pizza	Bradley Cooper; Licorice Pizza	Ariana DeBose; West Side Story
2022 - 12th	Everything Everywhere All at Once	Daniels; Everything Everywhere All at Once	Colin Farrell; The Banshees of Inisherin	Michelle Yeoh; Everything Everywhere All at Once	Ke Huy Quan; Everything Everywhere All at Once	Stephanie Hsu; Everything Everywhere All at Once
2023 - 13th	Oppenheimer	Christopher Nolan; Oppenheimer	Cillian Murphy; Oppenheimer	Lily Gladstone; Killers of the Flower Moon	Robert Downey Jr. Oppenheimer	Da'Vine Joy Randolph; The Holdovers
2024 - 14th	Anora	Denis Villeneuve; Dune: Part Two	Colman Domingo; Sing Sing	Mikey Madison; Anora	Kieran Culkin; A Real Pain	Danielle Deadwyler; The Piano Lesson
2025 - 15th	One Battle After Another	Paul Thomas Anderson; One Battle After Another	Timothée Chalamet; Marty Supreme	Jessie Buckley; Hamnet	Benicio del Toro; One Battle After Another	Amy Madigan; Weapons

=== Breakthrough Award winner history ===
The Breakthrough Award is credited to an individual only and not to a film. Danielle Deadwyler and Stephanie Hsu tied for the Breakthrough Award in 2022, marking the first tie in Georgia Film Critics history in any category.

Year	Winner	Role
2011 - 1st	Jessica Chastain	Performer
2012 - 2nd	Benh Zeitlin	Director, writer, composer
2013 - 3rd	Brie Larson	Performer
2014 - 4th	David Oyelowo	Performer
2015 - 5th	Alicia Vikander	Performer
2016 - 6th	Mahershala Ali	Performer
2017 - 7th	Jordan Peele	Director, writer
2018 - 8th	Elsie Fisher	Performer
2019 - 9th	Florence Pugh	Performer
2020 - 10th	Emerald Fennell	Director, writer
2021 - 11th	Alana Haim	Performer
2022 - 12th	Danielle Deadwyler; Stephanie Hsu	Performer; Performer
2023 - 13th	Dominic Sessa	Performer
2024 - 14th	RaMell Ross	Director, writer
2025 - 15th	Miles Caton	Performer, songwriter

=== Multiple award winners ===
==== Films with multiple awards ====
- 8 awards:
  - Oppenheimer (2023): Best Film, Best Director, Best Actor, Best Supporting Actor, Best Adapted Screenplay, Best Cinematography, Best Original Score, Best Ensemble
- 6 awards:
  - Everything Everywhere All at Once (2022): Best Film, Best Director, Best Actress, Best Supporting Actor, Best Supporting Actress, Best Original Screenplay
  - The Tree of Life (2011): Best Film, Best Director, Best Supporting Actor, Best Supporting Actress, Best Cinematography, Best Art Direction
- 5 awards:
  - La La Land (2016): Best Director, Best Original Screenplay, Best Production Design, Best Original Score, Best Original Song
  - Licorice Pizza (2021): Best Picture, Best Actress, Best Supporting Actor, Best Original Screenplay, Best Ensemble
  - Moonlight (2016): Best Film, Best Supporting Actor, Best Adapted Screenplay, Best Cinematography, Best Ensemble
  - One Battle After Another (2025): Best Film, Best Director, Best Supporting Actor, Best Adapted Screenplay, Best Ensemble
- 4 awards:
  - Lady Bird (2017): Best Film, Best Director, Best Actress, Best Supporting Actress
  - Mad Max: Fury Road (2015): Best Film, Best Director, Best Cinematography, Best Production Design
  - Nomadland (2020): Best Film, Best Director, Best Adapted Screenplay, Best Cinematography
  - Parasite (2019): Best Film, Best Director, Best Original Screenplay, Best Foreign Language Film
  - Silver Linings Playbook (2012): Best Film, Best Actress, Best Adapted Screenplay, Best Ensemble
  - Sinners (2025): Best Original Screenplay, Best Cinematography, Best Original Score, Best Original Song
- 3 awards:
  - 1917 (2019): Best Cinematography, Best Production Design, Best Original Score
  - Anora (2024): Best Picture, Best Actress, Best Original Screenplay
  - Dune (2021): Best Cinematography, Best Production Design, Best Original Score
  - The Favourite (2018): Best Supporting Actress, Best Production Design, Best Ensemble
  - Gravity (2013): Best Director, Best Cinematography, Best Production Design
  - Her (2013): Best Film, Best Original Screenplay, Best Original Score
  - Roma (2018): Best Director, Best Cinematography, Best Foreign Language Film
  - Skyfall (2012): Best Supporting Actress, Best Cinematography, Best Original Song
  - A Star Is Born (2018): Best Film, Best Supporting Actor, Best Original Song
  - 12 Years a Slave (2013): Best Actor, Best Supporting Actor, Best Supporting Actress
- 2 awards:
  - Barbie (2023): Best Production Design, Best Original Song
  - Beasts of the Southern Wild (2012): Best Production Design, Best Original Score
  - Boyhood (2014): Best Film, Best Director
  - Certified Copy (2011): Best Actress, Best Foreign Film
  - Challengers (2024): Best Original Score, Best Original Song
  - Coco (2017): Best Original Song, Best Animated Film
  - Dune: Part Two (2024): Best Director, Best Cinematography
  - Dunkirk (2017): Best Cinematography, Best Original Score
  - Flow (2024): Best International Film, Best Animated Film
  - Get Out (2017): Best Actor, Best Original Screenplay
  - Glass Onion: A Knives Out Mystery (2022): Best Adapted Screenplay, Best Ensemble
  - The Grand Budapest Hotel (2014): Best Production Design, Best Ensemble
  - The Holdovers (2023): Best Supporting Actress, Best Original Screenplay
  - Inside Out (2015): Best Original Screenplay, Best Animated Film
  - The Irishman (2019): Best Supporting Actor, Best Adapted Screenplay
  - Little Women (2019): Best Supporting Actress, Best Ensemble
  - Moneyball (2011): Best Actor, Best Adapted Screenplay
  - Nightcrawler (2014): Best Actor, Best Original Screenplay
  - The Power of the Dog (2021): Best Director, Best Adapted Screenplay
  - Promising Young Woman (2020): Best Actress, Best Original Screenplay
  - One Night in Miami (2020): Best Original Song, Best Ensemble
  - Selma (2014): Best Original Song, Oglethorpe Award for Excellence in Georgia Cinema
  - Soul (2020): Best Original Score, Best Animated Film
  - Sound of Metal (2020): Best Actor, Best Supporting Actor
  - Top Gun: Maverick (2022): Best Cinematography, Best Original Song
  - Weapons (2025): Best Supporting Actress, Oglethorpe Award for Excellence in Georgia Cinema

==== People with multiple awards ====
- 3 awards:
  - Paul Thomas Anderson - Best Original Screenplay: Licorice Pizza (2021); Best Director: One Battle After Another (2025); Best Adapted Screenplay: One Battle After Another (2025)
  - Alfonso Cuarón - Best Director: Gravity (2013), Roma (2018); Best Cinematography: Roma (2018)
  - Ludwig Göransson - Best Original Score: Oppenheimer (2023), Sinners (2025); Best Original Song: Sinners (2025)
  - Justin Hurwitz - Best Score: La La Land (2016), First Man (2018); Best Original Song: La La Land (2016)
  - Emmanuel Lubezki - Best Cinematography: The Tree of Life (2011), Gravity (2013), Birdman (2014)
  - Trent Reznor - Best Original Score: Soul (2020), Challengers (2024); Best Original Song: Challengers (2024)
  - Atticus Ross - Best Original Score: Soul (2021), Challengers (2024); Best Original Song: Challengers (2024)
  - Hans Zimmer - Best Original Score: Interstellar (2014), Dunkirk (2017), Dune (2021)
- 2 awards:
  - Mahershala Ali - Best Supporting Actor: Moonlight (2016); Breakthrough Award (2016)
  - Bong Joon-ho - Best Director, Best Original Screenplay: Parasite (2019)
  - Jane Campion - Best Director, Best Adapted Screenplay: The Power of the Dog (2021)
  - Jessica Chastain - Best Supporting Actress: The Tree of Life (2011); Breakthrough Award (2011)
  - Damien Chazelle - Best Director, Best Original Screenplay: La La Land (2016)
  - Ryan Coogler - Oglethorpe Award for Excellence in Georgia Cinema: Black Panther (2018); Best Original Screenplay: Sinners (2025)
  - Daniels - Best Director, Best Original Screenplay: Everything Everywhere All at Once (2022)
  - Danielle Deadwyler - Breakthrough Award (2022); Best Supporting Actress: The Piano Lesson (2024)
  - Roger Deakins - Best Cinematography: Skyfall (2012), 1917 (2019)
  - Emerald Fennell - Best Original Screenplay: Promising Young Woman (2020); Breakthrough Award (2020)
  - Greig Fraser - Best Cinematography: Dune (2021), Dune: Part Two (2024)
  - Dennis Gassner - Best Production Design: Blade Runner 2049 (2017), 1917 (2019)
  - Alana Haim - Best Actress: Licorice Pizza (2021); Breakthrough Award (2021)
  - Lady Gaga - Best Original Song: A Star is Born (2018), Top Gun: Maverick (2022)
  - Brie Larson - Breakthrough Award (2013); Best Actress: Room (2015)
  - Adam McKay - Best Adapted Screenplay: The Big Short (2015); Oglethorpe Award: Ant-Man (2015)
  - Christopher Nolan - Best Director: Oppenheimer (2023); Best Adapted Screenplay: Oppenheimer (2023)
  - Lupita Nyong'o - Best Supporting Actress: 12 Years a Slave (2013); Best Actress: Us (2019)
  - Brad Pitt - Best Actor: Moneyball (2011); Best Supporting Actor: The Tree of Life (2011)
  - Florence Pugh - Best Supporting Actress: Little Women (2019); Breakthrough Award (2019)
  - Stephanie Hsu - Best Supporting Actress: Everything Everywhere All at Once (2022); Breakthrough Award (2022)
  - Alicia Vikander - Best Supporting Actress: Ex Machina (2015); Breakthrough Award (2015)
  - Steve Zaillian - Best Adapted Screenplay: Moneyball (2011), The Irishman (2019),
  - Benh Zeitlin - Best Original Score: Beasts of the Southern Wild (2012); Breakthrough Award (2012)
  - Chloé Zhao - Best Director, Best Adapted Screenplay: Nomadland (2020)
