= Quvenzhané Wallis =

American actress (born 2003)

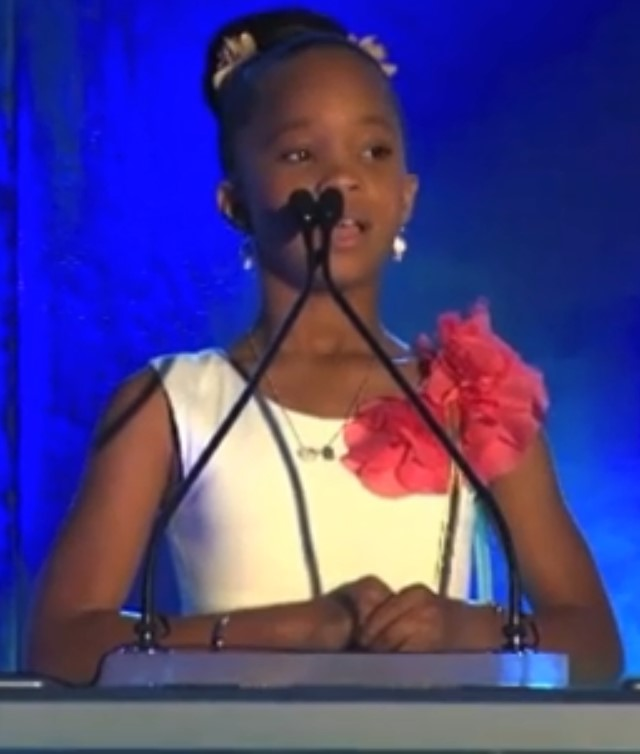
- Wallis at the 6th Annual Essence Black Women in Hollywood in 2013
- Born: August 28, 2003 (age 23); Houma, Louisiana, U.S.
- Occupations: Actress; author
- Years active: 2012–present

Quvenzhané Wallis (/kwəˈvɛnʒəneɪ/ kwə-VEN-zhə-nay; born August 28, 2003) is an American actress and author. She made her acting debut in the drama film Beasts of the Southern Wild (2012), which she was nominated for the Academy Award for Best Actress, making her the youngest nominee in the category and the first born in the 21st century. (Note: While she remains the only person born in the 21st century to be nominated for an acting Oscar, Wallis holds the additional distinction of being the youngest living Oscar nominee by present age, as of 2026.) Subsequent credits included Steve McQueen's 12 Years a Slave (2013) and the 2014 remake of the musical Annie, in which her portrayal of the title character was nominated for the Golden Globe Award for Best Actress, as well as a voice role in the animated film Trolls (2016).

Offscreen, Wallis has published four children's books, Shai & Emmie Star in Break an Egg! (2017), A Night Out with Mama (2017), Shai & Emmie Star in Dancy Pants! (2018), and Shai & Emmie Star in To the Rescue! (2018).

== Early life ==
Wallis was born on August 28, 2003, in Houma, Louisiana. Her parents are Qulyndreia Wallis (née Jackson), a teacher, and Venjie Wallis Sr., a truck driver. She has one sister, Qunyquekya, and two brothers, Vejon and Venjie Jr. Her name "Quvenzhané" combines the first syllables of her parents' first names in "Quven", and an alteration of the Swahili word jini meaning "sprite" or "fairy".

== Career ==
At age five, Wallis's parents lied about her age to audition for Beasts of the Southern Wild (2012), which had a minimum tryout age of six. She was chosen out of 4,000 to play Hushpuppy, an indomitable child prodigy and survivalist who lives with her dying father in the backwoods bayou squalor of Louisiana. Director Benh Zeitlin told The Daily Beast that when he auditioned Wallis, he immediately realized he had discovered what he was looking for, and changed the Beasts of the Southern Wild script to accommodate her strong-willed personality. Her reading prowess, loud screaming voice, and ability to burp on command impressed the director and won her the part. Zeitlin stated that "it was just the feeling behind her eyes".

The film premiered at Sundance Film Festival in January 2012, to positive reviews, winning the Grand Jury Prize. In May 2012, Wallis flew to France for the premiere of the film at the 2012 Cannes Film Festival. Wallis's performance drew widespread acclaim and Zeitlin won the Caméra d'Or, the festival's award for best first feature film. On January 10, 2013, at age nine, Wallis was nominated for an Academy Award for Best Actress in a Leading Role. Wallis, who was six when she filmed Beasts of the Southern Wild, is the youngest nominee for Best Actress and the third-youngest nominee in any category. Wallis is the first African-American child actor and the first person born in the 21st century to be nominated for an Academy Award.

Wallis had a role in the film 12 Years a Slave (2013), and collaborated with the Sundance Film Festival on a short film called Boneshaker. In 2014, she played the title character in Annie, the first African American to do so. For this, she was nominated for the Golden Globe Award for Best Actress in a Motion Picture – Musical or Comedy, but the film received mixed reviews by critics. In May 2014, Wallis became the first child celebrity to be named the face of a luxury brand when she was signed by Armani Junior, Giorgio Armani's fashion line for children and teens.

Wallis appeared in Beyoncé's 2016 music video for "All Night". In October 2017, she released two children's books: the friendship-centric Shai & Emmie Star in Break an Egg! and A Night Out With Mama, which is about her night at the Oscars with her mother. She published two more books, Shai & Emmie Star in To the Rescue! and Shai & Emmie Star in Dancy Pants!, in 2018.

She became a member of the Actors Branch of the Academy of Motion Picture Arts and Sciences in 2018.

== Filmography ==
=== Film ===
Year	Title	Role	Notes
2012	Beasts of the Southern Wild	Hushpuppy	
2013	12 Years a Slave	Margaret Northup	
2014	Annie	Annie Bennett	
2014	The Prophet	Almitra (voice)	
2015	Fathers and Daughters	Lucy	
2016	Lemonade	Herself	
2016	Trolls	Harper (voice)	
2024	Breathe	Zora	

=== Television ===
Year	Title	Role	Notes
2019	Black-ish	Kyra	Recurring role (season 5)
2021–2023	Swagger	Crystal	Main role
2022	American Horror Stories	Bianca	Episode: "Bloody Mary"

== Awards and nominations ==
Award	Year	Category	Work	Result	Ref.
Academy Awards	2013	Best Actress	Beasts of the Southern Wild	Nominated	
Alliance of Women Film Journalists	2013	Best Breakthrough Performance	Beasts of the Southern Wild	Won	
Austin Film Critics Association	2012	Breakthrough Artist Award	Beasts of the Southern Wild	Won	
Awards Circuit Community	2012	Best Actress in a Leading Role	Beasts of the Southern Wild	Nominated	
Black Reel Awards	2013	Best Actress	Beasts of the Southern Wild	Won	
Black Reel Awards	2013	Best Breakthrough Performance	Beasts of the Southern Wild	Won	
Central Ohio Film Critics Association	2013	Best Actress	Beasts of the Southern Wild	Nominated	
Central Ohio Film Critics Association	2013	Breakthrough Film Artist (acting)	Beasts of the Southern Wild	Runner-up	
Chicago Film Critics Association	2012	Best Actress	Beasts of the Southern Wild	Nominated	
Chicago Film Critics Association	2012	Most Promising Performer	Beasts of the Southern Wild	Won	
Chlotrudis Awards	2013	Best Actress	Beasts of the Southern Wild	Nominated	
Critics' Choice Movie Awards	2013	Best Actress	Beasts of the Southern Wild	Nominated	
Critics' Choice Movie Awards	2013	Best Young Actor/Actress	Beasts of the Southern Wild	Won	
Dallas–Fort Worth Film Critics Association	2012	Best Actress	Beasts of the Southern Wild	5th place	
Denver Film Critics Society	2013	Best Actress	Beasts of the Southern Wild	Nominated	
Florida Film Critics Circle	2012	Pauline Kael Breakout Award	Beasts of the Southern Wild	Won	
Georgia Film Critics Association	2013	Best Actress	Beasts of the Southern Wild	Nominated	
Georgia Film Critics Association	2013	Breakthrough Award	Beasts of the Southern Wild	Nominated	
Gold Derby Film Awards	2013	Best Lead Actress	Beasts of the Southern Wild	Nominated	
Gold Derby Film Awards	2013	Best Breakthrough Performer	Beasts of the Southern Wild	Won	
Gotham Independent Film Awards	2012	Breakthrough Actor	Beasts of the Southern Wild	Nominated	
Hollywood Film Awards	2012	New Hollywood Award	Beasts of the Southern Wild	Won	
Houston Film Critics Society	2013	Best Actress	Beasts of the Southern Wild	Nominated	
Independent Spirit Awards	2013	Best Female Lead	Beasts of the Southern Wild	Nominated	
IndieWire Critics Poll	2012	Best Lead Performance	Beasts of the Southern Wild	8th place	
International Online Cinema Awards	2013	Best Actress	Beasts of the Southern Wild	Nominated	
NAACP Image Awards	2013	Outstanding Actress in a Motion Picture	Beasts of the Southern Wild	Nominated	
National Board of Review	2012	Best Breakthrough Actress	Beasts of the Southern Wild	Won	
New York Film Critics Online	2012	Best Breakthrough Performer	Beasts of the Southern Wild	Won	
North Carolina Film Critics Association	2013	Best Actress	Beasts of the Southern Wild	Nominated	
Online Film Critics Society	2013	Best Actress	Beasts of the Southern Wild	Nominated	
Online Film and Television Association	2013	Best Actress	Beasts of the Southern Wild	Nominated	
Online Film and Television Association	2013	Best Youth Performance	Beasts of the Southern Wild	Nominated	
Online Film and Television Association	2013	Breakout Performance (female)	Beasts of the Southern Wild	Won	
Phoenix Film Critics Society	2012	Best Actress	Beasts of the Southern Wild	Nominated	
Phoenix Film Critics Society	2012	Best Female Youth Performance	Beasts of the Southern Wild	Won	
Phoenix Film Critics Society	2012	Breakout Performance (on screen)	Beasts of the Southern Wild	Won	
Satellite Awards	2012	Outstanding New Talent	Beasts of the Southern Wild	Won	
St. Louis Gateway Film Critics Association	2012	Best Actress	Beasts of the Southern Wild	Nominated	
Utah Film Critics Association	2012	Best Actress	Beasts of the Southern Wild	Nominated	
Village Voice Film Poll	2012	Best Actress	Beasts of the Southern Wild	5th place	
Village Voice Film Poll	2012	Breakthrough Artist Award	Beasts of the Southern Wild	Won	
Washington D.C. Area Film Critics Association	2012	Best Youth Performance	Beasts of the Southern Wild	Won	
Women Film Critics Circle	2012	Best Young Actress	Beasts of the Southern Wild	Won	
Phoenix Film Critics Society	2013	Best Acting Ensemble	12 Years a Slave	Nominated	
Black Reel Awards	2015	Outstanding Actress, Motion Picture	Annie	Nominated	
Critics' Choice Movie Awards	2015	Best Young Actor/Actress	Annie	Nominated	
Golden Globe Awards	2015	Best Actress – Motion Picture, Comedy or Musical	Annie	Nominated	
NAACP Image Awards	2015	Outstanding Actress in a Motion Picture	Annie	Nominated	
Women Film Critics Circle	2014	Best Young Actress	Annie	Nominated	
Black Reel Awards	2016	Outstanding Voice Performance	The Prophet	Nominated	

== See also ==
- List of oldest and youngest Academy Award winners and nominees – Youngest nominees for Best Actress in a Leading Role
- List of actors with Academy Award nominations
- List of accolades received by Beasts of the Southern Wild
