= San Diego Film Critics Society Awards 2012 =

Annual US film awards ceremony

17th SDFCS Awards

December 11, 2012

Best Film:
Argo

Best Director:
Ben Affleck
Argo

The 17th San Diego Film Critics Society Awards were announced on December 11, 2012.

== Winners and nominees ==
=== Best Actor ===
Daniel Day-Lewis – Lincoln

- Bradley Cooper – Silver Linings Playbook
- John Hawkes – The Sessions
- Hugh Jackman – Les Misérables
- Joaquin Phoenix – The Master

=== Best Actress ===
Michelle Williams – Take This Waltz

- Jessica Chastain – Zero Dark Thirty
- Helen Hunt – The Sessions
- Jennifer Lawrence – Silver Linings Playbook
- Naomi Watts – The Impossible

=== Best Animated Film ===
ParaNorman

- Brave
- Frankenweenie
- Rise of the Guardians
- Wreck-It Ralph

=== Best Cinematography ===
Life of Pi – Claudio Miranda

- Beasts of the Southern Wild – Ben Richardson
- Django Unchained – Robert Richardson
- The Master – Mihai Mălaimare Jr.
- Les Misérables – Danny Cohen

=== Best Director ===
Ben Affleck – Argo

- Paul Thomas Anderson – The Master
- Kathryn Bigelow – Zero Dark Thirty
- Ang Lee – Life of Pi
- David O. Russell – Silver Linings Playbook

=== Best Documentary ===
The Invisible War

- Bully
- Jiro Dreams of Sushi
- The Queen of Versailles
- Samsara

=== Best Editing ===
Argo – William Goldenberg

- Killing Them Softly – Brian A. Kates and John Paul Horstmann
- Life of Pi – Tim Squyres
- The Master – Leslie Jones and Peter McNulty
- Zero Dark Thirty – William Goldenberg and Dylan Tichenor

=== Best Ensemble Performance ===
The Perks of Being a Wallflower

- Argo
- Django Unchained
- Les Misérables
- Seven Psychopaths

=== Best Film ===
Argo

- Django Unchained
- The Master
- Silver Linings Playbook
- Zero Dark Thirty

=== Best Foreign Language Film ===
The Kid with a Bike (Le gamin au vélo) • Belgium / France / Italy

- Amour • Austria / France / Germany
- Headhunters (Hodejegerne) • Norway
- Holy Motors • France / Germany
- The Intouchables (Intouchables) • France

=== Best Production Design ===
Cloud Atlas – Hugh Bateup and Uli Hanisch

- Anna Karenina – Sarah Greenwood
- Argo – Sharon Seymour
- Les Misérables – Eve Stewart
- Moonrise Kingdom – Adam Stockhausen

=== Best Score ===
The Master – Jonny Greenwood

- Argo – Alexandre Desplat
- Beasts of the Southern Wild – Benh Zeitlin and Dan Romer
- Life of Pi – Mychael Danna
- Moonrise Kingdom – Alexandre Desplat

=== Best Original Screenplay ===
The Master – Paul Thomas Anderson

- The Cabin in the Woods – Joss Whedon and Drew Goddard
- Django Unchained – Quentin Tarantino
- Moonrise Kingdom – Wes Anderson and Roman Coppola
- Take This Waltz – Sarah Polley

=== Best Adapted Screenplay ===
Argo – Chris Terrio

- Life of Pi – David Magee
- Lincoln – Tony Kushner
- The Perks of Being a Wallflower – Stephen Chbosky
- Silver Linings Playbook – David O. Russell

=== Best Supporting Actor ===
Christoph Waltz – Django Unchained

- Alan Arkin – Argo
- Philip Seymour Hoffman – The Master
- Matthew McConaughey – Killer Joe
- Christopher Walken – Seven Psychopaths

=== Best Supporting Actress ===
Emma Watson – The Perks of Being a Wallflower

- Amy Adams – The Master
- Samantha Barks – Les Misérables
- Anne Hathaway – Les Misérables
- Rebel Wilson – Pitch Perfect
