= Washington D.C. Area Film Critics Association Awards 2012 =

Annual US film awards ceremony

11th WAFCA Awards
- Date: December 10, 2012

Highlights
- Best Film: Zero Dark Thirty
- Best Director: Kathryn Bigelow for Zero Dark Thirty
- Best Actor: Daniel Day-Lewis
- Best Actress: Jessica Chastain

The 11th Washington D.C. Area Film Critics Association Awards were held on December 10, 2012.

== Winners and nominees ==
Best Film

- Zero Dark Thirty

- Argo
- Les Misérables
- Lincoln
- Silver Linings Playbook

Best Director

- Kathryn Bigelow – Zero Dark Thirty

- Ben Affleck – Argo
- Paul Thomas Anderson – The Master
- Tom Hooper – Les Misérables
- Steven Spielberg – Lincoln

Best Actor

- Daniel Day-Lewis – Lincoln

- John Hawkes – The Sessions
- Hugh Jackman – Les Misérables
- Joaquin Phoenix – The Master
- Denzel Washington – Flight

Best Actress

- Jessica Chastain – Zero Dark Thirty

- Marion Cotillard – Rust and Bone
- Jennifer Lawrence – Silver Linings Playbook
- Helen Mirren – Hitchcock
- Emmanuelle Riva – Amour

Best Supporting Actor

- Philip Seymour Hoffman – The Master

- Alan Arkin – Argo
- Javier Bardem – Skyfall
- Leonardo DiCaprio – Django Unchained
- Tommy Lee Jones – Lincoln

Best Supporting Actress

- Anne Hathaway – Les Misérables

- Amy Adams – The Master
- Samantha Barks – Les Misérables
- Sally Field – Lincoln
- Helen Hunt – The Sessions

Best Adapted Screenplay

- Silver Linings Playbook – David O. Russell

- Argo – Chris Terrio
- Life of Pi – David Magee
- Lincoln – Tony Kushner
- The Perks of Being a Wallflower – Stephen Chbosky

Best Original Screenplay

- Looper – Rian Johnson

- Django Unchained – Quentin Tarantino
- The Master – Paul Thomas Anderson
- Moonrise Kingdom – Wes Anderson and Roman Coppola
- Zero Dark Thirty – Mark Boal

Best Ensemble

- Les Misérables

- Argo
- Lincoln
- Moonrise Kingdom
- Zero Dark Thirty

Best Animated Film

- ParaNorman

- Brave
- Frankenweenie
- Rise of the Guardians
- Wreck-It Ralph

Best Documentary Film

- Bully

- The Imposter
- The Invisible War
- The Queen of Versailles
- Searching for Sugar Man

Best Foreign Language Film

- Amour • Austria

- The Intouchables • France
- I Wish • Japan
- A Royal Affair • Hungary
- Rust and Bone • Belgium

Best Art Direction

- Cloud Atlas

- Anna Karenina
- Les Misérables
- Lincoln
- Moonrise Kingdom

Best Cinematography

- Life of Pi

- Les Misérables
- The Master
- Skyfall
- Zero Dark Thirty

Best Score

- The Master – Jonny Greenwood

- Beasts of the Southern Wild – Dan Romer and Benh Zeitlin
- The Hobbit: An Unexpected Journey – Howard Shore
- Lincoln – John Williams
- Moonrise Kingdom – Alexandre Desplat

Best Youth Performance

- Quvenzhané Wallis – Beasts of the Southern Wild

- Jared Gilman – Moonrise Kingdom
- Kara Hayward – Moonrise Kingdom
- Tom Holland – The Impossible
- Logan Lerman – The Perks of Being a Wallflower
