= Lucy Alibar =

American screenwriter and playwright

- Born: Lucy Harrison; 1983 (age 42–43); Florida, U.S.
- Occupations: Screenwriter, playwright

Lucy Alibar (born Lucy Harrison, 1983) is an American screenwriter and playwright best known for co-writing the 2012 film Beasts of the Southern Wild with Benh Zeitlin.

== Early life ==
Lucy Alibar was raised near Monticello, Florida; her parents are Baya M. Harrison III, a criminal defense attorney, and Barbara Harrison, an artist who taught painting classes in prisons. She went to high school in Tallahassee, Florida, where her mother worked, and began spending time reading in public libraries "until the library closed every day". It was there that she discovered experimental theatre and aspired to become a playwright. She won a writing competition at the age of fourteen run by Young Playwrights Inc. When she turned eighteen, she legally changed her surname from Harrison to Alibar, a portmanteau of her mother and grandmother's first names (Barbara and Alice), since "they both worked so hard and cultivated so much of their own happiness [and] I wanted to have that like an amulet."

== Career ==
Alibar attended New York University in Manhattan, where she studied under the Tisch School of the Arts' experimental theatre program. After graduating from NYU, she continued to live on New York's Lower East Side, working multiple jobs as a sandwich maker, bartender and waitress while writing plays in her free time. Around 2010 she wrote Juicy and Delicious, a play based on her own experiences in dealing with her father's declining health. In the play, a young boy named Hushpuppy faces the illness and death of his father, which paralleled her reaction to her father's cerebrovascular disease and coronary artery bypass surgery. She showed the completed script to her longtime friend, filmmaker Benh Zeitlin, who suggested that they adapt the play into a film. For the film, Hushpuppy is a girl. Alibar and Zeitlin began to develop a screenplay, which was chosen by the Sundance Institute to be developed with support from other filmmakers at the institute's Screenwriting Lab. After the script was completed, Alibar moved to Louisiana to assist in the production of the film, titled Beasts of the Southern Wild, which was being directed by Zeitlin. It was selected for screening at the 2012 Cannes Film Festival; in order to afford the travel fares to attend the festival in France, she raised money through the crowdfunding website Indiegogo. The film was released in June 2012 and Alibar and Zeitlin's script received numerous awards and nominations, including a Humanitas Prize and an Academy Award nomination for Best Adapted Screenplay, while Alibar won the award for Woman of the Year at NYU's Fusion Film Festival.

After the release of Beasts of the Southern Wild, Alibar wrote a film adaptation of The Secret Garden to be directed by Guillermo del Toro and adapted one of her plays, Christmas and Jubilee Behold the Meteor Shower, into a screenplay for the production company Escape Artists. The resulting film titled Troop Zero debuted at the Sundance Film Festival in 2019. In late 2013 she also sold a novel, The Prophet of Grady County, to Scribner.

In 2019, Alibar joined other WGA writers in firing their agents as part of the WGA's stand against the ATA and the practice of packaging. Lucy wrote the screenplay for Where the Crawdads Sing.

== Personal life ==
Lucy married producer Pavun Shetty on August 29, 2022 in Florence.
