= Silver Linings Playbook =

2012 film by David O. Russell

- Theatrical release poster
- Directed by: David O. Russell
- Screenplay by: David O. Russell
- Based on: The Silver Linings Playbook by Matthew Quick
- Produced by: Donna Gigliotti; Bruce Cohen; Jonathan Gordon
- Starring: Bradley Cooper; Jennifer Lawrence; Robert De Niro; Jacki Weaver; Anupam Kher; Chris Tucker
- Cinematography: Masanobu Takayanagi
- Edited by: Jay Cassidy; Crispin Struthers
- Music by: Danny Elfman
- Distributed by: The Weinstein Company
- Release dates: September 8, 2012 (TIFF); November 16, 2012 (United States)
- Running time: 122 minutes
- Country: United States
- Language: English
- Budget: $21 million
- Box office: $236.4 million

Silver Linings Playbook is a 2012 American romantic drama film written and directed by David O. Russell. The film is based on Matthew Quick's 2008 novel The Silver Linings Playbook. It stars Bradley Cooper and Jennifer Lawrence, with Robert De Niro, Jacki Weaver, Anupam Kher, and Chris Tucker in supporting roles.

The film is set in Lansdowne, Pennsylvania. Cooper plays Patrizio "Pat" Solitano Jr., a man with bipolar disorder who is released from a psychiatric hospital and moves in with his parents (De Niro and Weaver). Pat is determined to restore the love of his estranged wife. He meets a young widow, Tiffany Maxwell (Lawrence), who offers to help him if he enters a dance competition with her. The two become closer as they train, and Pat, his father, and Tiffany examine their relationships with each other as they cope with their situations.

Silver Linings Playbook premiered at the 2012 Toronto International Film Festival on September 8, 2012, and was released in the United States by The Weinstein Company on November 16, 2012. The film opened to critical acclaim, with praise for Russell's direction and screenplay, and the performances of Cooper and Lawrence. It grossed $236.4 million worldwide. A recipient of several accolades, it received eight nominations at the 85th Academy Awards, including Best Picture, Best Director, Best Adapted Screenplay, Best Actor, Best Supporting Actor and Supporting Actress and with Lawrence winning the Academy Award for Best Actress.

== Plot ==
After 8 months' treatment in a psychiatric hospital in Baltimore for bipolar disorder, Patrizio "Pat" Solitano Jr. is released into the care of his parents, Patrizio Sr. and Dolores, at his childhood home in Upper Darby Township, Pennsylvania. His primary focus is to reconcile with his ex-wife, Nikki. She has moved away and obtained a restraining order against him after he found her in the shower with another man and badly beat him.

Pat's therapist, Cliff Patel, tries to convince him to keep taking his medication because a repeat of his violent outbursts might send him back to the hospital in Baltimore. Pat tells him that he has a new outlook on life: He attempts to see the good, or silver lining, in all that he experiences. Meanwhile, Pat experiences a series of anxiety attacks, sometimes triggered by hearing "My Cherie Amour" by Stevie Wonder, other times he imagines hearing the song during an anxiety attack.

Pat attends dinner at his best friend Ronnie's house, where Ronnie's sister-in-law, Tiffany Maxwell, a widow with an unnamed disorder, is also a guest. They connect, talking about different psychiatric medications they have taken to manage their mental illnesses. She tries to offer him casual sex, but Pat is focused on getting Nikki back. Trying to get closer to him, Tiffany offers to deliver a letter to Nikki if, in return, he partners with her in an upcoming dance competition. Convinced that helping Tiffany will show Nikki he has changed and has developed sensitivity to others, Pat agrees. Pat and Tiffany start practicing over the following weeks.

Hoping to open a restaurant, Patrizio Sr. has resorted to illegal bookmaking. Having bet most of his money on a Philadelphia Eagles game, Patrizio asks Pat to attend for good luck, irrationally believing Pat's attention to the game affects its outcome. Pat points out this is OCD ideation but appeases his father. Pat asks Tiffany for time off from practice to attend the game. She gives him a typed reply from Nikki, which cautiously hints they may be able to reconcile. Before entering the stadium, Pat and his brother Jake get into a fight with racist fans and are arrested. The Eagles lose the game, and Patrizio Sr. is furious.

When Patrizio Sr. claims that the Eagles lost because of Tiffany's newfound involvement in Pat's life, Tiffany refutes his allegations by pointing out that Philadelphia sports teams had done better whenever she and Pat were together. Convinced, Patrizio makes a parlay with his friend Randy: If the Eagles win their week 16 game against the Dallas Cowboys and Tiffany and Pat score five out of ten in their dance competition, he will win back double the money he lost on the first bet.

Pat is reluctant, but Tiffany, Dolores, and Patrizio conspire to persuade him to dance in the competition, telling him Nikki will be there. Noticing that the letter from Nikki includes the phrase "If it's me reading the signs...", frequently used by Tiffany, he realizes that Tiffany fabricated the letter. Tiffany, Pat, and their friends and family arrive at the competition on the night of the football game. Tiffany despairs when she sees Nikki in the audience, invited by Ronnie and his wife Veronica. They want Nikki to lift her restraining order on Pat, giving them the chance to reconcile. Tiffany starts to drink heavily at the bar.

Pat finds Tiffany moments before their turn and drags her onto the dance floor. They begin their routine as the Eagles defeat the Cowboys. After their set, Tiffany and Pat receive an average score of exactly 5.0 points amid cheers from friends and family and confused looks from the crowd. Pat approaches Nikki and whispers into her ear. Seeing this, Tiffany runs off. Pat Sr. tells his son that unlike Nikki, Tiffany really loves him, and he should not let her go, as it would haunt him for the rest of his life. Pat catches Tiffany and hands her a letter in which he admits to knowing she forged the letter earlier. He confesses that he loved her from the moment they became acquainted, but that it took him a long time to realize and accept it. They share a kiss. Patrizio opens a restaurant with the money he has won, and Pat and Tiffany begin a relationship, no longer wearing their wedding rings.

== Cast ==
- Bradley Cooper as Patrizio "Pat" Solitano Jr., a former teacher and recent divorcee
- Jennifer Lawrence as Tiffany Maxwell, a young widow
- Robert De Niro as Patrizio "Pat" Solitano Sr., Pat and Jake's father
- Jacki Weaver as Dolores Solitano, Pat and Jake's mother
- Anupam Kher as Cliff Patel, Pat's doctor and friend
- Chris Tucker as Danny McDaniels, a good friend of Pat's and fellow patient from the psychiatric hospital
- Julia Stiles as Veronica Maxwell, Tiffany's sister
- Shea Whigham as Jake Solitano, Pat's brother
- John Ortiz as Ronnie, Veronica's husband, Pat's best friend, and Tiffany's brother-in-law
- Brea Bee as Nikki Solitano, Pat's unfaithful ex-wife
- Cheryl Williams as Tiffany and Veronica's mother
- Patrick McDade as Tiffany and Veronica's father
- Dash Mihok as Officer Keogh
- Matthew Russell as Ricky D'Angelo
- Paul Herman as Randy
- Patsy Meck as Nancy, the principal of the school where Pat and Nikki worked
- Phillip Chorba as Jordie, Tiffany Maxwell's ex-boyfriend

== Production ==
=== Development ===
Renee Witt, an executive at The Weinstein Company, convinced Harvey Weinstein to option the book by Matthew Quick on which the film is based, doing so before it was published. Sydney Pollack began developing for David O. Russell to direct. Pollack told Russell that the film adaptation would be tricky because of the story's mixture of troubling emotion, humor, and romance. Russell estimates that he rewrote the script twenty times over five years. Russell was drawn to the story because of the family relationships and the connection he felt to his own son, who has bipolar disorder and OCD.

The film was shot in 33 days. A darker, more extreme version of the dance sequence was filmed, and scenes with De Niro's character were shot in multiple versions, with the character harsher or warmer, as Russell worked with editor Jay Cassidy to set the balance they wanted.

The locations are Upper Darby, Ridley Park and Lansdowne communities just outside Philadelphia, Pennsylvania. Although not mentioned by name in the film, Ridley Park is credited at the end, and a police officer can be seen wearing the initials "RPPD" on his collar.

The film takes place during the second half of the 2008 NFL football season, which saw the Philadelphia Eagles advance to the NFC Championship Game. Several games are mentioned, including the Eagles' victories over Seattle and San Francisco, their losses to two of their NFC East rivals Washington Redskins and the New York Giants (which was the game Pat was attending when the fight broke out), and their victory over Dallas in the regular season's final game.

=== Casting ===
Russell initially intended to make the film with Vince Vaughn and Zooey Deschanel, but instead went on to make The Fighter. Mark Wahlberg was set to work with Russell for the fourth time, but had to drop out after delays in production created a scheduling conflict.

Russell had originally planned to work with Bradley Cooper on an adaptation of Pride and Prejudice and Zombies, having been impressed with Cooper's performance in Wedding Crashers (2005), citing his "good bad-guy energy" and unpredictability as justification for casting. Cooper told Russell that "he had been heavier and angrier and more fearful" at the time of that performance and had drawn on those feelings for it. Russell was excited that Cooper would bring those qualities to Pat Solitano.

Anne Hathaway was cast as Tiffany Maxwell, but due to scheduling conflicts with The Dark Knight Rises and creative differences with Russell, she dropped out. Other actresses who were considered for the part included Elizabeth Banks, Kirsten Dunst, Angelina Jolie, Blake Lively, Rooney Mara, Rachel McAdams, Andrea Riseborough and Olivia Wilde.

Initially, Russell did not believe that Jennifer Lawrence's age was suitable for the role. He thought that Lawrence (21 at the time of filming) was too young to play opposite Cooper (37), but her audition changed his mind, admitting that the "expressiveness in her eyes and in her face" was "ageless". Russell compares Lawrence to the character Tiffany, describing her as confident but one of the least neurotic people he knows, with the confidence and glimpses of vulnerability needed to play Tiffany. Tiffany went through several iterations. She was initially meant to be goth. Lawrence dyed her hair black and did test shoots in heavy goth makeup, but Weinstein disapproved. The final version of her character remained messed-up yet confident, with small goth touches such as the dark hair and a cross. Specifically for the role, Lawrence was asked by Russell to put on weight and to speak in a lower register.

According to Entertainment Weekly, Lawrence said she did not have a handle on Tiffany at first, which was what excited her about the role. "She was just a character I one-hundred percent did not understand at all... She's like, 'I'm messed up, I'm not like everybody else, I've got issues. Take it or leave it because I like myself.'"

Lawrence and Cooper had no previous dance experience. In less than a month, Mandy Moore, a choreographer for So You Think You Can Dance, taught them the dance sequences. Moore describes Cooper as having "some real natural dancing ability". Lawrence said of the climactic ballroom dance, "None of that was improvised, absolutely not. I'm a terrible dancer, so I would never have been able to do any of that. When it finally came together, that scene really was just as fun as it feels."

== Music ==
The musical score was composed by Danny Elfman. Silver Linings Playbook: Original Motion Picture Soundtrack is the soundtrack to the film released by Sony Music Entertainment on November 16, 2012 featuring songs heard in the film. Elfman's score for the film was also released simultaneously with the song album.

== Release ==
Silver Linings Playbook premiered at the 2012 Toronto International Film Festival on September 8, 2012, where it won the People's Choice Award. It opened at the 2012 Mumbai Film Festival on October 18, 2012, and received a limited release in the United States on November 16, 2012, opening wider later that week.

The Weinstein Company initially planned an unusually wide release for Silver Linings Playbook, going nationwide on an estimated 2,000 screens. They were encouraged by positive reviews and hoping to capitalize on Thanksgiving to do more business. Instead, they took a more slow-burn approach, opening in fewer theaters, expanding gradually, in a strategy to build up word-of-mouth support. Continuing the slow release, the film expanded to 700 theaters on December 25.

=== Home media ===
Silver Linings Playbook was released on DVD and Blu-ray on April 30, 2013, by Anchor Bay Entertainment.

== Reception ==
=== Box office ===
Silver Linings Playbook earned $443,003 in its opening weekend from 16 locations, facing strong competition from films including Skyfall and Lincoln. Expanding to 367 locations in its second week, the film moved to ninth place with $4.4 million. By December 30, it was showing at 745 theaters and had earned $27.3 million. On January 18, 2013, it earned $12.7 million when it expanded to 2,523 theaters, which boosted its total to $56.7 million. In its second weekend of playing in over 2500 theaters, its sales declined by 12.2%. Gitesh Pandya stated that it was well on its way to reaching the $100 million mark and could go much higher if it remained durable over the weeks.

Ray Subers forecast that the film would earn $100 million, predicting that the film would start slow but keep going through December and gain a wide audience, bringing in fans of Cooper and Lawrence from their work on big franchise films, The Hangover and The Hunger Games, respectively. The film surpassed the $100 million mark in North America on February 19, 2013.

=== Critical response ===
Silver Linings Playbook premiered at the 2012 Toronto International Film Festival and was critically acclaimed. The film has an approval rating of 92% on Rotten Tomatoes based on 260 reviews, with an average rating of 8.2/10. The website's critical consensus reads, "Silver Linings Playbook walks a tricky thematic tightrope, but David O. Russell's sensitive direction and sharp work from a talented cast gives it true balance." On Metacritic, which assigns a weighted mean rating out of 100 reviews from mainstream critics, the film holds an average score of 81, based on reviews from 45 critics, indicating "universal acclaim". Audiences surveyed by CinemaScore gave the film an average grade of "A−" on an A+ to F scale.

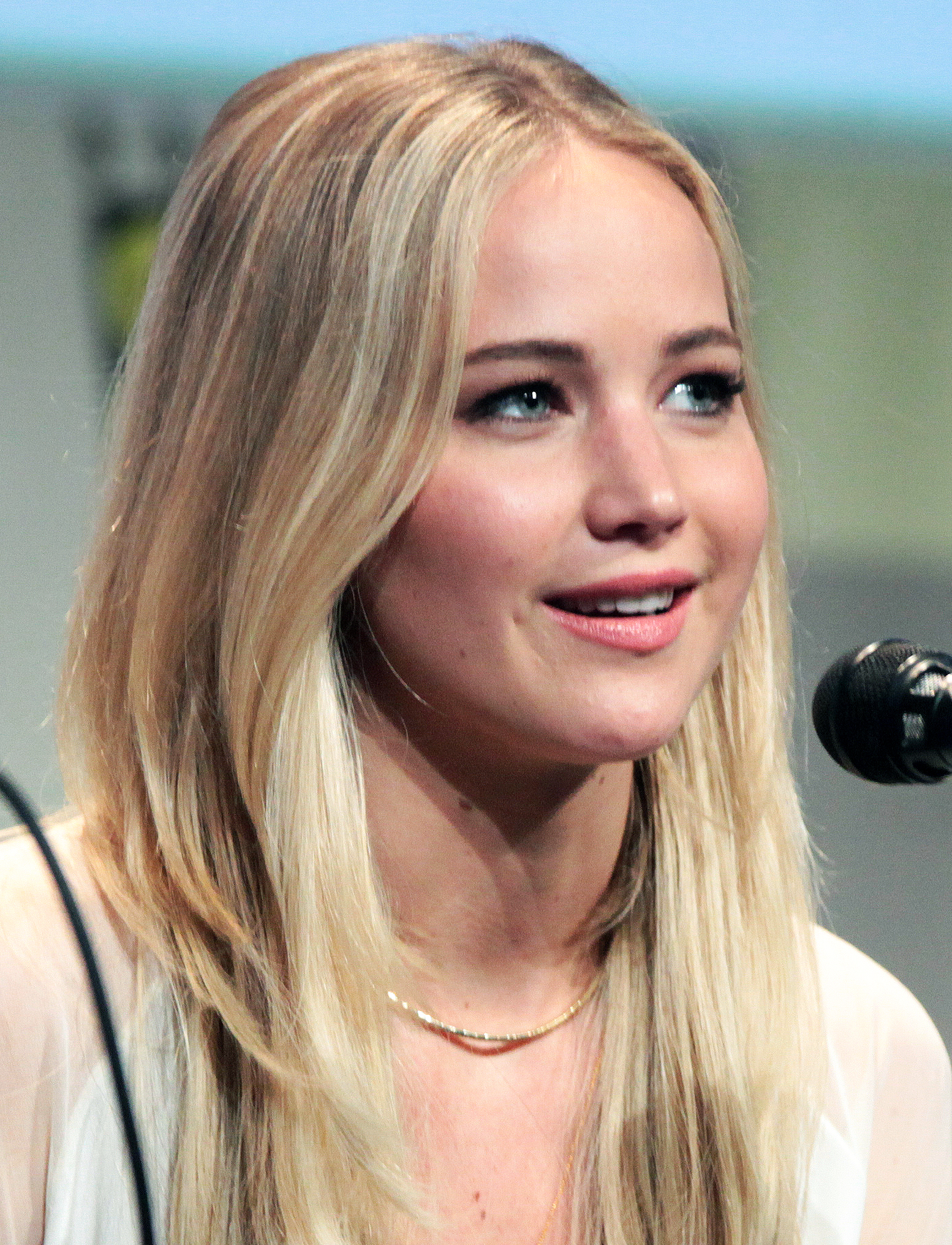
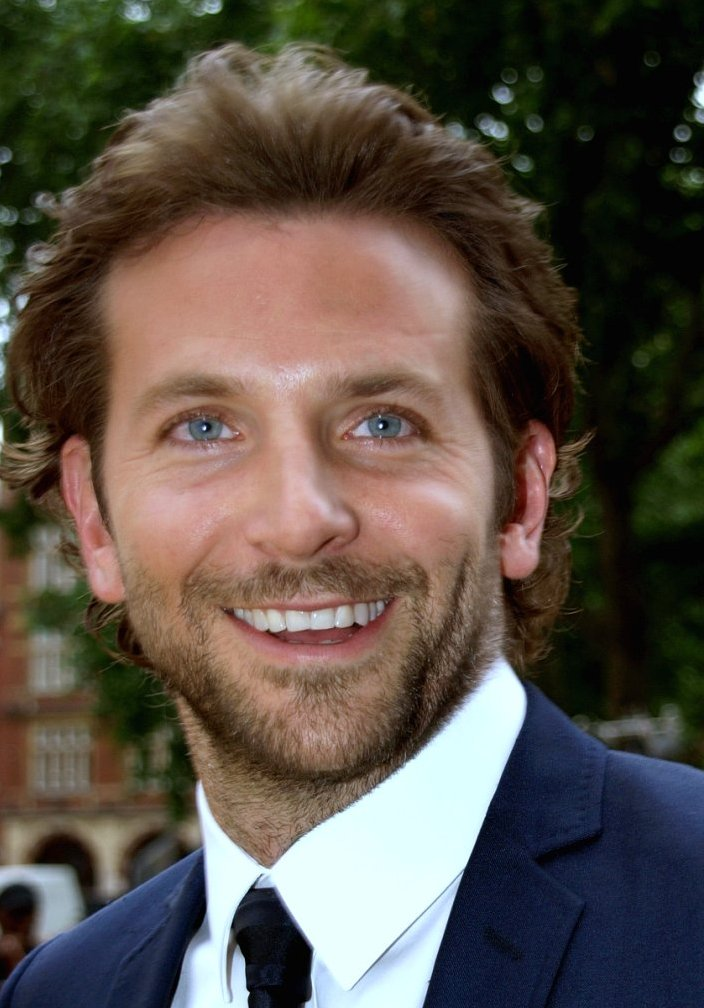
Lawrence and Cooper received widespread critical acclaim for their performances and both were Oscar nominated, with Lawrence winning making her the second-youngest Best Actress winner.

Cooper and Lawrence were lauded for their performances. Kevin Jagernauth of The Playlist praised the film as "an enormously entertaining, crowd-pleasing winner" and noted that the performances from the two leads were "carefully developed, and perfectly pitched", deserving of awards. David Rooney of The Hollywood Reporter said that "the chemistry between Cooper and Lawrence makes them a delight to watch" and that their performances anchor the ensemble cast who also give great performances even in small roles. Rooney also complimented the "invigorating messiness" and "nervous energy" of the choreography. Richard Corliss of Time magazine also applauded the performances of the leads, particularly Lawrence, stating that her performance is "the reason to stay" to watch the whole film, and praising her maturity.

Russell's direction and screenplay were also widely acclaimed, with Justin Chang of Variety writing: "Never one to shy away from unlikely sources of comedy, David O. Russell tackles mental illness, marital failure and the curative powers of football and dance with bracingly sharp and satisfying results." Eric Kohn of Indiewire gave the film an "A−" grade, praising Russell's direction and the performances of Cooper and Lawrence, stating that "both as solo screenwriter and director, Russell assembles a small, bubbly cast for an unexpectedly charming romcom that frequently dances — at one point, quite literally — between cynicism and bittersweetness with largely winning results." Ann Hornaday of The Washington Post remarked on Russell's skill, noting how "in any other hands, the adaptation of Matthew Quick's novel would be the stuff of banal rom-com fluff or, perhaps worse, self-consciously quirky indie cliches."

Roger Ebert gave the film 3.5 out of four stars, saying that the film was "so good, it could almost be a terrific old classic" and described Russell's screenplay as "ingenious" for the way the major concerns of both the father and son pivot on the final bet. Kenneth Turan called the film "a complete success" and the actors' performances "superb," including Chris Tucker in an "irresistible" supporting turn. Steven Rea of The Philadelphia Inquirer called the film "a transcendent endeavor, from its exhilaratingly smart screenplay... to the unexpected and moving turns of its two leads." Ricardo Baca of The Denver Post praised how the film managed to maintain "the awkward laughs, giddy anxiousness and warm butterflies from the trailer" for its entire length. Peter Travers of Rolling Stone called it "one of the year's best films. It's crazy good."

Negative reviews of the film came from The New Yorker, whose critic David Denby called it "a miscalculation from beginning to end" and found Cooper's character "tiresome", while Richard Brody found Linings perhaps to "be the year's most artificial film" and "the plot [...] utterly ridiculous." In a rare step outside the magazine's typical practices, Brody revisited the film and wrote a supplementary review, once again condemning it as having "no characters but sets of switches, each of which has a binary set of options and all of which have to line up for things to come out right." Brody wrote, "I'm finding it hard not to make fun of the film's highly constructed and narrow-bore array of givens, of plot points and their resolutions." Both critics found Lawrence's Oscar-winning performance "unconvincing". Denby wrote, "we don't believe [Tiffany] for a second when she says that, in her grief, she 'had sex with everyone in my office'. Lawrence is tough and proud, and always plays strong, and the remark doesn't track with anything we see onscreen." Brody finds Lawrence "a poised and graceful actress" who "has none of the wildness that her character needs—and that lack of wildness is part of the reason for the film's success."

Robbie Collin of The Daily Telegraph wrote that there's a "tiring fruitlessness to the mayhem", describing the lead character as a "rambling headcase", though noting Lawrence as the film's "only 'silver lining'". The Globe and Mail's chief film critic, Liam Lacey, gave 3 out of four stars, but wrote "you can easily see Silver Linings Playbook as a better-acted version of any number of Sundance-style films about quirky outsiders who find a common bond."

The NFL was critical of the gambling in the film and declined to broadcast an interview with Bradley Cooper and Chris Tucker during Thanksgiving.

In 2025, it was one of the films voted for the "Readers' Choice" edition of The New York Times' list of "The 100 Best Movies of the 21st Century," finishing at number 199.

=== Accolades ===
At the 85th Academy Awards, Silver Linings Playbook received eight nominations, including Best Picture, Best Director for Russell, Best Actor for Cooper, Best Actress for Lawrence, Best Supporting Actor for De Niro and Best Supporting Actress for Weaver, Best Adapted Screenplay and Best Film Editing, with Lawrence winning the film's only Academy Award, becoming the second-youngest winner in the Best Actress category, behind only Marlee Matlin in Children of a Lesser God (1986). It became the first film since Reds (1981) to be Oscar-nominated for the four acting categories and the first since Million Dollar Baby (2004) to be nominated for the Big Five Oscars, In 2021, Writers Guild of America West (WGAW) and Writers Guild of America, East (WGAE) included its screenplay in WGA's "101 Greatest Screenplays of the 21st Century (*so far)".

=== Top ten lists ===
- Cinemablend listed the film at number 8 on its list of the year's 10 best.
- Critic Catherine Shoard of The Guardian listed the film at number 4 on her list of the year's 10 best.

== Musical adaptation ==
It was announced on October 5, 2021 that the movie will be developed into a stage musical for Broadway.
