= Beasts of the Southern Wild =

2012 film by Benh Zeitlin

- Theatrical release poster
- Directed by: Benh Zeitlin
- Screenplay by: Lucy Alibar; Benh Zeitlin
- Based on: Juicy and Delicious by Lucy Alibar
- Produced by: Dan Janvey; Josh Penn; Michael Gottwald
- Starring: Quvenzhané Wallis; Dwight Henry
- Cinematography: Ben Richardson
- Edited by: Crockett Doob; Affonso Gonçalves
- Music by: Dan Romer; Benh Zeitlin
- Production companies: Cinereach; Court 13; Journeyman Pictures
- Distributed by: Fox Searchlight Pictures
- Release dates: January 20, 2012 (Sundance); June 27, 2012 (US)
- Running time: 93 minutes
- Country: United States
- Language: English
- Budget: $1.8 million
- Box office: $23.3 million

Beasts of the Southern Wild is a 2012 American magical realism film directed, co-written, and co-scored by Benh Zeitlin. It was adapted by Zeitlin and Lucy Alibar from Alibar's one-act play Juicy and Delicious. The film stars Quvenzhané Wallis and Dwight Henry. After playing at film festivals, its limited theatrical release began in New York and Los Angeles on June 27, 2012, before expanding to additional markets.

Beasts of the Southern Wild was met with commercial success and acclaim from critics, with praise going to the cinematography and Wallis's performance. The film was nominated for four Academy Awards in 2013: Best Picture, Best Director, Best Adapted Screenplay, and Best Actress (Wallis). At age 9, Wallis became the youngest Best Actress nominee in history.

== Plot ==
Six-year-old Hushpuppy and her ailing, hot-tempered father Wink live in a small community on an island in the Louisiana bayou called the "Bathtub". Although it lies beyond the levee system that helps protect the land to the north from rising sea levels, Wink thinks it is the most beautiful place in the world and looks down on the way people live on the other side of the levee.

In a rustic community schoolhouse, Miss Bathsheba teaches the children of the Bathtub about prehistoric creatures she calls aurochs (portrayed as giant horned boar-like creatures in the film, unlike the true aurochs, a species of wild cattle) that terrorized cavemen and ate their children. She says the cavemen did not bemoan their fate, however, and the students should remember this lesson and learn how to survive, since the fabric of the universe will soon come "unraveled", causing the ice caps to melt and the Bathtub to end up underwater.

At home, Hushpuppy finds Wink has gone missing, so she fends for herself. When he returns, he is wearing a hospital gown and bracelet. They argue, and he tells Hushpuppy to leave him alone. She returns to her house, which is a separate building from the one in which Wink resides, and finds her food burning on the stove. She turns up the heat, which sets her house on fire and draws Wink's attention. A chase ensues between the two, and she ends up getting slapped by Wink. When she retaliates by punching him in the chest, he collapses. At the same moment, there is a rumble of thunder. Hushpuppy thinks she has thrown off the balance of the universe by striking her father and runs to get help. Miss Bathsheba gives her some herbal medicine, but when Hushpuppy gets back home Wink is nowhere to be found.

Meanwhile, Hushpuppy imagines that the ice calving releases some aurochs that have been frozen in polar ice into the ocean. Throughout the rest of the film, they are seen to reach land, break out of the ice that encases them, and make their way toward the Bathtub.

As the weather worsens and Hushpuppy watches many residents of the Bathtub fleeing the impending flood, she sees Wink staggering along the side of the road. He finds some friends and encourages them to ride out the storm before taking Hushpuppy home to do the same. The Bathtub floods overnight, and the next day Wink and Hushpuppy tour the devastation and reconnect with the handful of their neighbors who have also stayed behind.

The remaining Bathtub residents build floating homes and make plans to rebuild their community. Some of them think the flooding is only temporary, but Miss Bathsheba thinks it is permanent and says the amount of time before they will have to move is limited. As time passes, it seems likely that she is right, so Wink hatches a plan to drain the water away by blowing a hole in the levee with an alligator gar carcass stuffed with explosives. The water recedes, but then authorities arrive to enforce a mandatory evacuation of the Bathtub. They remove the remaining residents to an emergency shelter and Wink undergoes an operation for his ailment against his wishes. It has come too late to restore his health, however, and he tries to send Hushpuppy to be raised by someone else, but she refuses to go. At the first opportunity, the evacuees escape back to their homes.

While Wink lies dying, Hushpuppy and a few of her friends attempt to swim to a flashing light across the water that she feels might lead her to her absent mother. They are picked up by a boat that takes them to a floating bar known as the Elysian Fields. Hushpuppy thinks that the cook is her mother, though the woman doesn't recognize her. The cook says Hushpuppy can stay with her if she wants, but Hushpuppy says she needs to go home.

Hushpuppy gets back to the Bathtub just as the aurochs are also arriving. Her friends run away, but she calmly stands her ground and confronts the aurochs. She convinces them to leave and goes to be with Wink. They say their last goodbyes, and she and the remaining residents of the Bathtub give him the funeral he asked for.

== Cast ==
- Quvenzhané Wallis as Hushpuppy
- Dwight Henry as Wink, Hushpuppy's father
- Henry D. Coleman as Peter T, a resident of the Bathtub
- Levy Easterly as Jean Battiste, a resident of the Bathtub
- Pamela Harper as Little Jo, a resident of the Bathtub
- Jovan Hathaway as The cook, Hushpuppy's mother
- Lowell Landes as Walrus, a resident of the Bathtub
- Jimmy Lee Moore as Sgt. Major, the owner of a boat
- Gina Montana as Miss Bathsheba, Hushpuppy's teacher
- Jonshel Alexander as Joy Strong, a friend of Hushpuppy
- Amber Henry as LZA, a friend of Hushpuppy
- Kaliana Brower as T-Lou, a friend of Hushpuppy
- Nicholas Clark as Boy with bell ("Sticks")
- Philip Lawrence as Dr. Maloney
- Marilyn Barbarin as Cabaret singer (uncredited)

== Setting and location ==
The film's fictional setting, "Isle de Charles Doucet", known to its residents as the Bathtub, was inspired by several isolated and independent fishing communities threatened by erosion, hurricanes, and rising sea levels in Louisiana's Terrebonne Parish, most notably the rapidly eroding Isle de Jean Charles. It was filmed in Montegut, a town in Terrebonne Parish.

== Production ==
The film was shot on 16mm film, and director Benh Zeitlin created the production with a small professional crew and dozens of local residents in and around Montegut, Louisiana. The filmmakers call themselves "Court 13", which is the first credit at the end of the film.

At her audition, Quvenzhané Wallis (who was five years old, though the casting call had been for girls between six and nine) impressed the filmmakers with her reading ability, tremendous scream, and ability to burp on command, all of which are used in the film. After refusing Zeitlin's direction to throw a water bottle at another actor because she believed that it wasn't right to do so, the filmmakers were further convinced and the director said, "I realised this is Hushpuppy, that's what this whole movie is about: this moral girl who believes in right and wrong so strongly."

Dwight Henry, who plays Wink, was not looking for an acting job and had no acting experience. As he explained in an interview with the San Diego Reader:

Before I was cast in the part I owned a bakery called Henry's Bakery and Deli right across the street from the casting agency where Court 13 had their studio. They used to come over and have lunch or breakfast in the morning. After a few months we kinda developed a relationship. They used to put these fliers in the bakery with a phone number to call if you were interested in appearing in one of their movies.

He read for the part during a slow hour and was chosen, but at the time he was in the middle of moving to a larger building (which would become the Buttermilk Drop Bakery and Café, in the Tremé neighborhood of New Orleans) and the filmmakers had trouble finding him to let him know. When they did, he explained that he could not leave his new business, but they were determined to have him and he eventually agreed to take the role. Henry later concluded, "I was in Hurricane Katrina in neck-high water. I have an inside understanding for what this movie is about. I brought a passion to the part that an outside actor who had never seen a storm or been in a flood or faced losing everything couldn't have. … I was two years old when Hurricane Betsy hit New Orleans and my parents had to put me on the roof of the house. An outsider couldn't have brought the passion to the role that I did."

== Reception ==
On Rotten Tomatoes, the film has an approval rating of 87% based on 208 reviews, with an average rating of 8.30/10. The website's critical consensus reads: "Beasts of the Southern Wild is a fantastical, emotionally powerful journey and a strong case of filmmaking that values imagination over money." On Metacritic, the film has a weighted average score of 86 out of 100 based on 45 critics, indicating "universal acclaim".

The film was designated a 2012 "Critics' Pick" by the reviewers of The New York Times. Author and critic A. O. Scott, writing for Times, calls Beasts a

blast of sheer, improbable joy, a boisterous, thrilling action movie with a protagonist who can hold her own... Hushpuppy, the 6-year-old heroine of 'Beasts of the Southern Wild,' has a smile to charm fish out of the water and a scowl so fierce it can stop monsters in their tracks. The movie, a passionate and unruly explosion of Americana, directed by Benh Zeitlin, winks at skepticism, laughs at sober analysis and stares down criticism.

Scott subsequently named Beasts of the Southern Wild the third-best film of 2012. Roger Ebert of the Chicago Sun-Times called the film a "remarkable creation... Sometimes miraculous films come into being, made by people you've never heard of, starring unknown faces, blindsiding you with creative genius. "Beasts of the Southern Wild" is one of the year's best films."

Michael Phillips of the Chicago Tribune said that Beasts was "the most divisive film of 2012," opining that "The filmmaker comes from a perspective of great empathy and considerable skill. But he's a pile driver as a dramatist. The film's screw-tightening methods are so overbearing, the story, the characters, the little girl's plight have to struggle to breathe or develop anything like an inner life." Author and activist bell hooks wrote a negative review of the film, saying "the vibrancy in this film is generated by a crude pornography of violence" and calling Hushpuppy "a miniature version of the 'strong black female matriarch,' racist and sexist representations have depicted from slavery on into the present day."

The performance of newcomer Quvenzhané Wallis was met with critical acclaim. Amy Biancolli of the San Francisco Chronicle says,

Regarding Wallis' performance as Hushpuppy: it isn't one. It's a fact. Onscreen she simply is, a being as elemental, incontestable and strong as the advancing aurochs. She was 6 when the film was shot, yet the ferociousness of her presence – the anger and wisdom inside her – suggest someone older or ageless.

Peter Travers of Rolling Stone describes Wallis as "flat-out amazement." He adds that "there's no way you won't be captivated by Wallis, chosen ahead of 3,500 candidates to play the tiny folk hero who narrates the story. Her performance in this deceptively small film is a towering achievement." Ebert wrote in his review that Hushpuppy is "played by a force of nature named Quvenzhané Wallis... She is so uniquely and particularly herself that I wonder if the movie would have been possible without her." Scott said: "Played by Quvenzhané Wallis, an untrained sprite who holds the camera's attention with a charismatic poise that might make grown-up movie stars weep in envy, Hushpuppy is an American original, a rambunctious blend of individualism and fellow feeling." On January 10, 2013, Wallis was nominated for the Academy Award for Best Actress. At 9 years old, she is the youngest ever nominee in that category.

In an interview with People magazine, President Barack Obama described the film as "spectacular." The film's acclaim resulted in its Centerpiece screening at the 2012 Traverse City Film Festival. Sight & Sound film magazine listed the film at #5 on its list of best films of 2012.

== Accolades ==
The film won the Caméra d'Or award at the 2012 Cannes Film Festival after competing in the Un Certain Regard section. It also won the Grand Jury Prize: Dramatic at the 2012 Sundance Film Festival (where it premiered) and the Grand Jury Prize at the 2012 Deauville American Film Festival. The film went on to earn the Los Angeles Film Festival's Audience Award for Best Narrative Feature and the Seattle International Film Festival's Golden Space Needle Award for Best Director. In October, it was announced that the film had won the Sutherland Trophy for Most Innovative Debut. On January 10, 2013, the film was nominated for four Oscars, in the categories of Best Picture, Best Director (Benh Zeitlin), Best Actress (Quvenzhané Wallis), and Best Adapted Screenplay (Lucy Alibar & Benh Zeitlin). The script won the 2012 Ray Bradbury Award for Outstanding Dramatic Presentation from the Science Fiction and Fantasy Writers of America.

== See also ==
- List of black films of the 2010s
- List of directorial debuts
- Beasts of the Southern Wild (soundtrack)
