= Benh Zeitlin =

American filmmaker (born 1982)

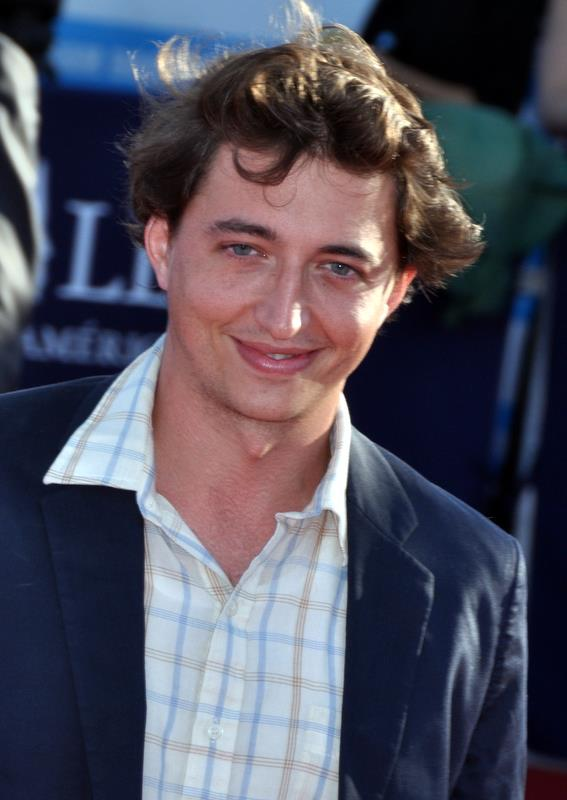
- Zeitlin at the Deauville American Film Festival, September 2012
- Born: Benjamin Harold Zeitlin; October 14, 1982 (age 44); New York City, New York, U.S.
- Occupation: Filmmaker
- Notable work: Beasts of the Southern Wild

Benjamin Harold Zeitlin (/ˈbɛn ˈzaɪtlɪn/; born October 14, 1982) is an American filmmaker, best known for directing and co-writing the 2012 film Beasts of the Southern Wild, for which he received two Academy Award nominations.

== Early life ==
Zeitlin was born in Manhattan and raised in Sunnyside, Queens, New York, and in suburban Hastings-on-Hudson, NY. He is a graduate of Hastings High School and Wesleyan University. He was born to writers and folklorists Mary Amanda Dargan and Steven Joel Zeitlin, who founded the NYC non-profit cultural organization City Lore. His father, who is Jewish, spent most of his childhood in Brazil; his mother comes from a rural, Protestant background in Darlington, South Carolina. His younger sister is screenwriter and artist Eliza Zeitlin.

== Career ==
In 2004, Zeitlin co-founded the Court 13 independent collection of filmmakers, named after a neglected Wesleyan University squash court that he and his friends had once commandeered as a filming location. His younger sister Eliza Zeitlin and he moved to New Orleans while he was making his first short film, Glory at Sea, in 2008.

In 2012, Zeitlin's first feature, Beasts of the Southern Wild, adapted from a play entitled Juicy and Delicious by Lucy Alibar, won the Caméra d'Or award at the Cannes Film Festival, the Grand Jury Prize: Dramatic at the Sundance Film Festival, and the Grand Jury Prize at the 2012 Deauville American Film Festival. The film went on to earn the Los Angeles Film Festival's Audience Award for Best Narrative Feature and the Seattle International Film Festival's Golden Space Needle Award for Best Director. Zeitlin was also given a Humanitarian Award for his work on the film at the Satellite Awards 2012. Notably, Zeitlin both directed Beasts of the Southern Wild and co-composed the score.

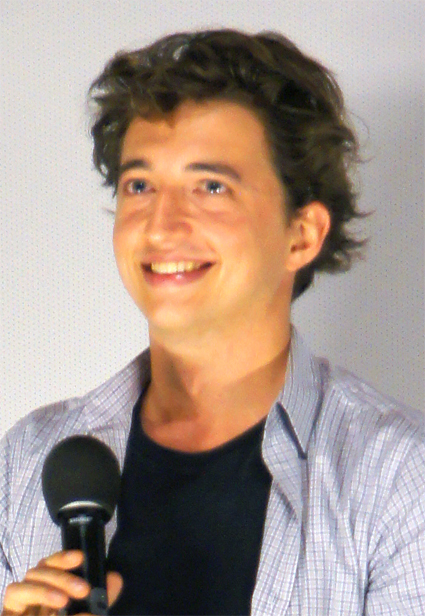
Zeitlin at the Fantasy Film Festival in Berlin, August 26, 2012

For his directorial work and screenplay in Beasts of the Southern Wild, Zeitlin collected several additional awards and nominations. At the Gotham Independent Film Awards in 2012, he won the Breakthrough Director Award. At the same awards ceremony, Zeitlin received the inaugural Bingham Ray Award, which honors the independent filmmaker who died in 2012. Zeitlin also won a Humanitas Prize (as co-writer/director; shared with Alibar as co-writer), amongst other awards.

In 2019, it was revealed that Zeitlin was directing his next feature Wendy in Montserrat, an island south of Antigua. Inspired by Peter Pan, Zeitlin described the film as "a friendship-love story-adventure of her and a joyous, reckless, pleasure-mongering young boy as they swirl in and out of youth and as the ecosystem around them spirals toward destruction."

Zeitlin's next film, Hold On to Your Angels, is scheduled to begin filming in February 2027. The film is a romance set in southern Louisiana, and will star Paul Mescal and Jessie Buckley.

== See also ==
- List of accolades received by Beasts of the Southern Wild
- List of oldest and youngest Academy Award winners and nominees#Youngest nominees
