= BAFTA Award for Best Actress in a Leading Role =

British film industry award

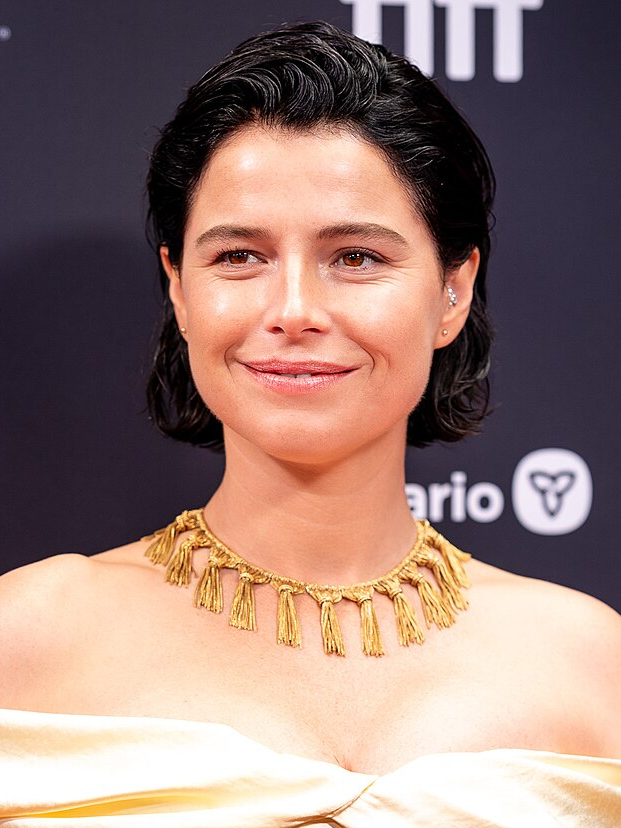
- The 2025 recipient: Jessie Buckley
- Awarded for: Best Performance by an Actress in a Leading Role
- Country: United Kingdom
- Presented by: British Academy of Film and Television Arts
- Currently held by: Jessie Buckley for Hamnet (2025)
- Website: http://www.bafta.org/

Best Actress in a Leading Role is a British Academy Film Award presented annually by the British Academy of Film and Television Arts (BAFTA) to recognise an actress who has delivered an outstanding leading performance in a film.

In the following lists, the titles and names in bold with a gold background are the winners and recipients respectively; those not in bold are the nominees. The years given are those in which the films under consideration were released, not the year of the ceremony, which always takes place the following year.

== History ==
- From 1952 to 1967, there were two Best Actress awards presented, Best British Actress and Best Foreign Actress.
- From 1968 onwards, the two awards merged into one award, which from 1968 to 1984 was known as Best Actress.
- From 1985 to present, the award has been known by its current name of Best Actress in a Leading Role.

== Winners and nominees ==
indicates the winner

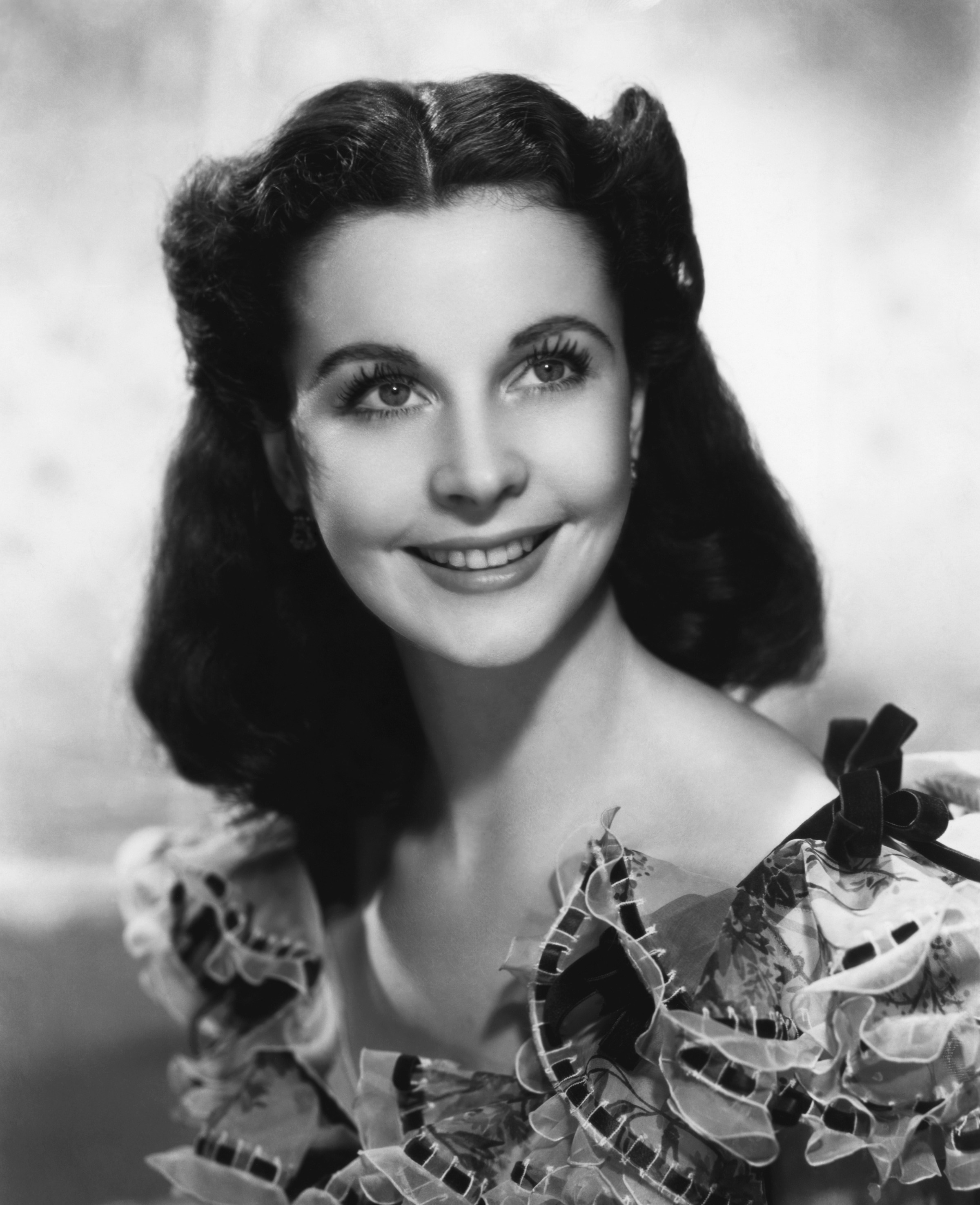
Vivien Leigh was the inaugural winner, for A Streetcar Named Desire (1952).

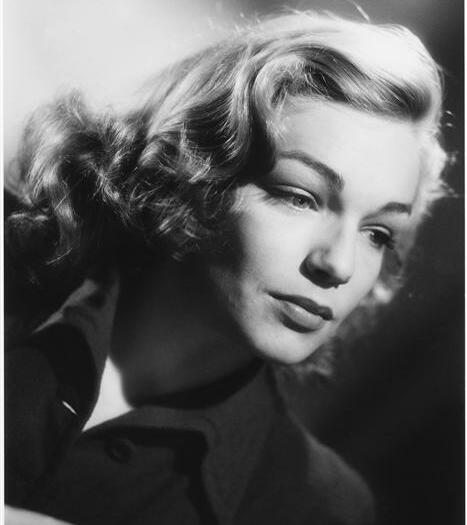
Simone Signoret won thrice, for Golden Helmet (1952), The Witches of Salem (1957), and Room at the Top (1958).

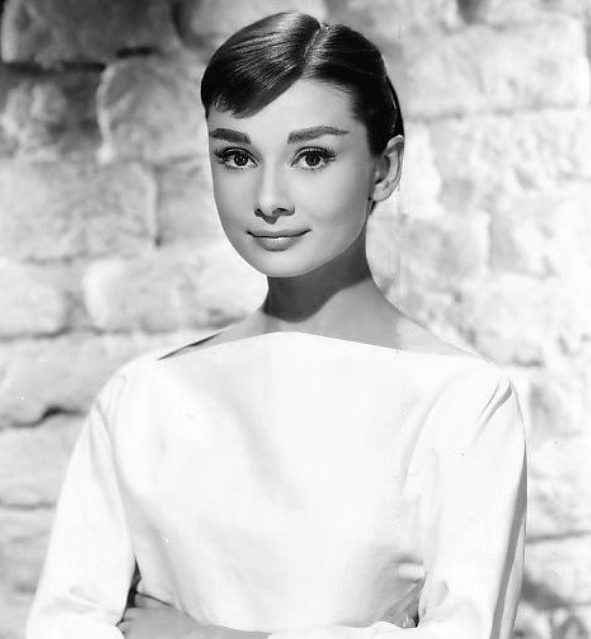
Audrey Hepburn won thrice, for Roman Holiday (1953), The Nun's Story (1959), and Charade (1963).

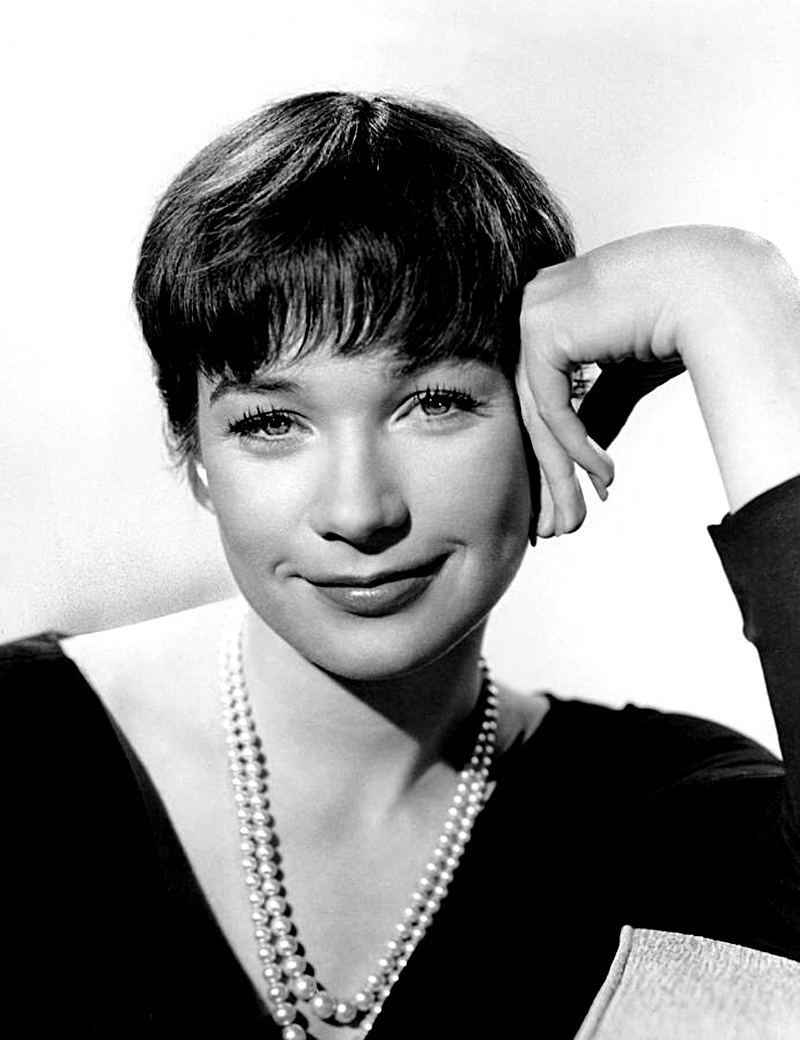
Shirley MacLaine won twice, for Ask Any Girl (1959) and The Apartment (1960).

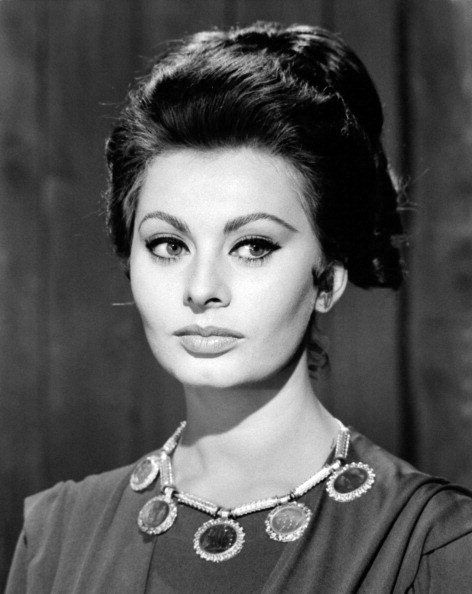
Sophia Loren won for Two Women (1961)

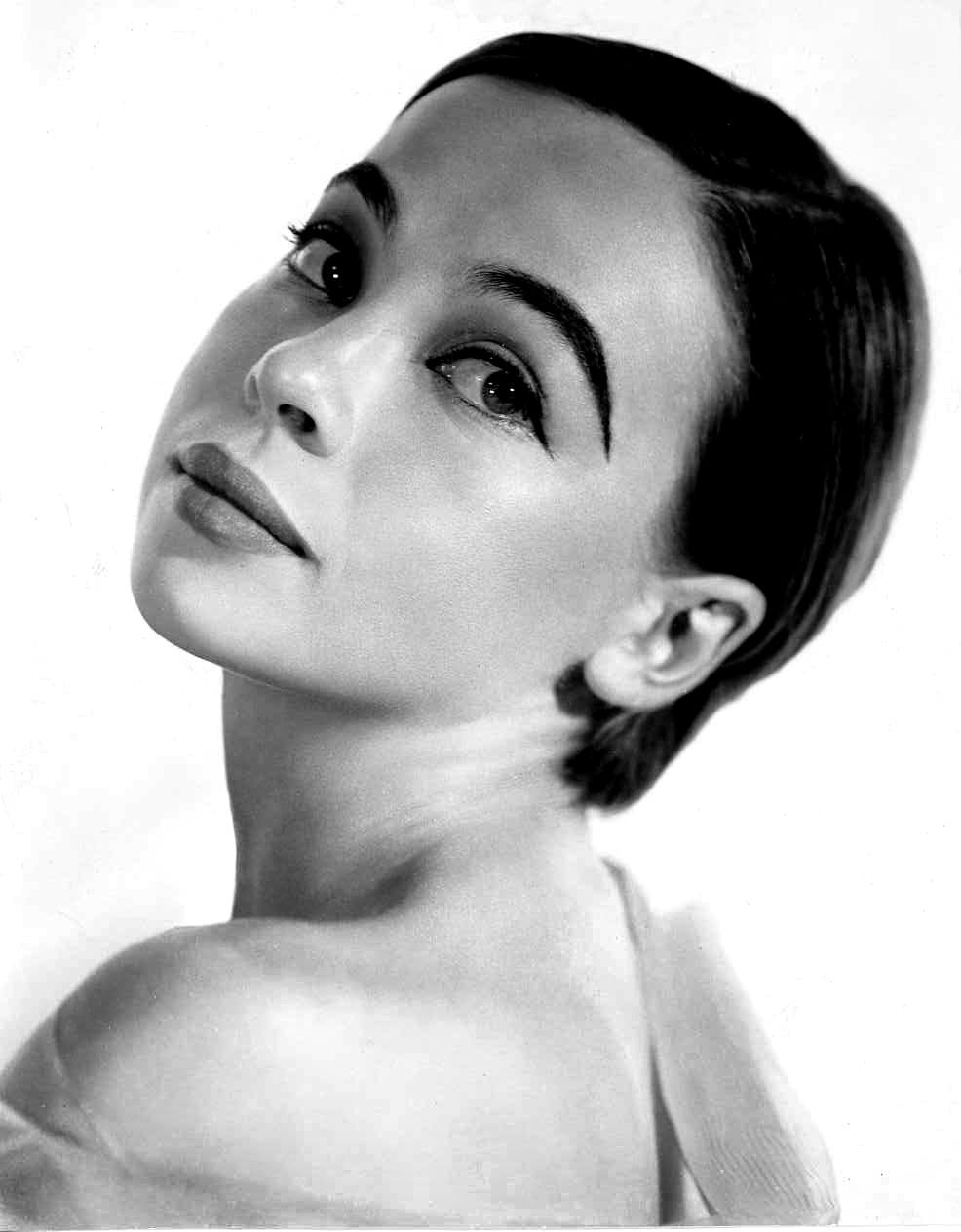
Leslie Caron won twice, for Lili (1953) and The L-Shaped Room (1962).

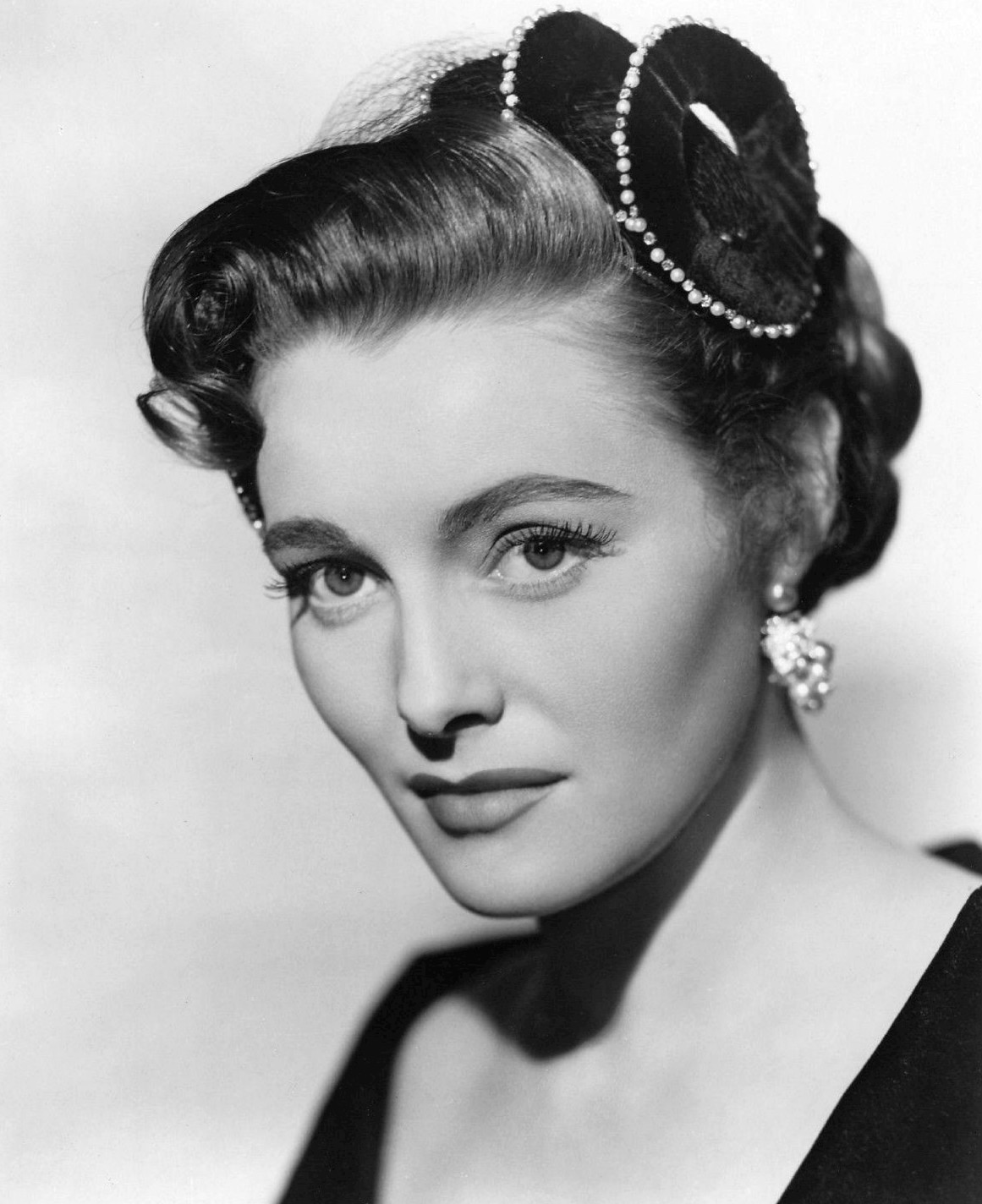
Patricia Neal won twice, for Hud (1963) and In Harms Way (1965)

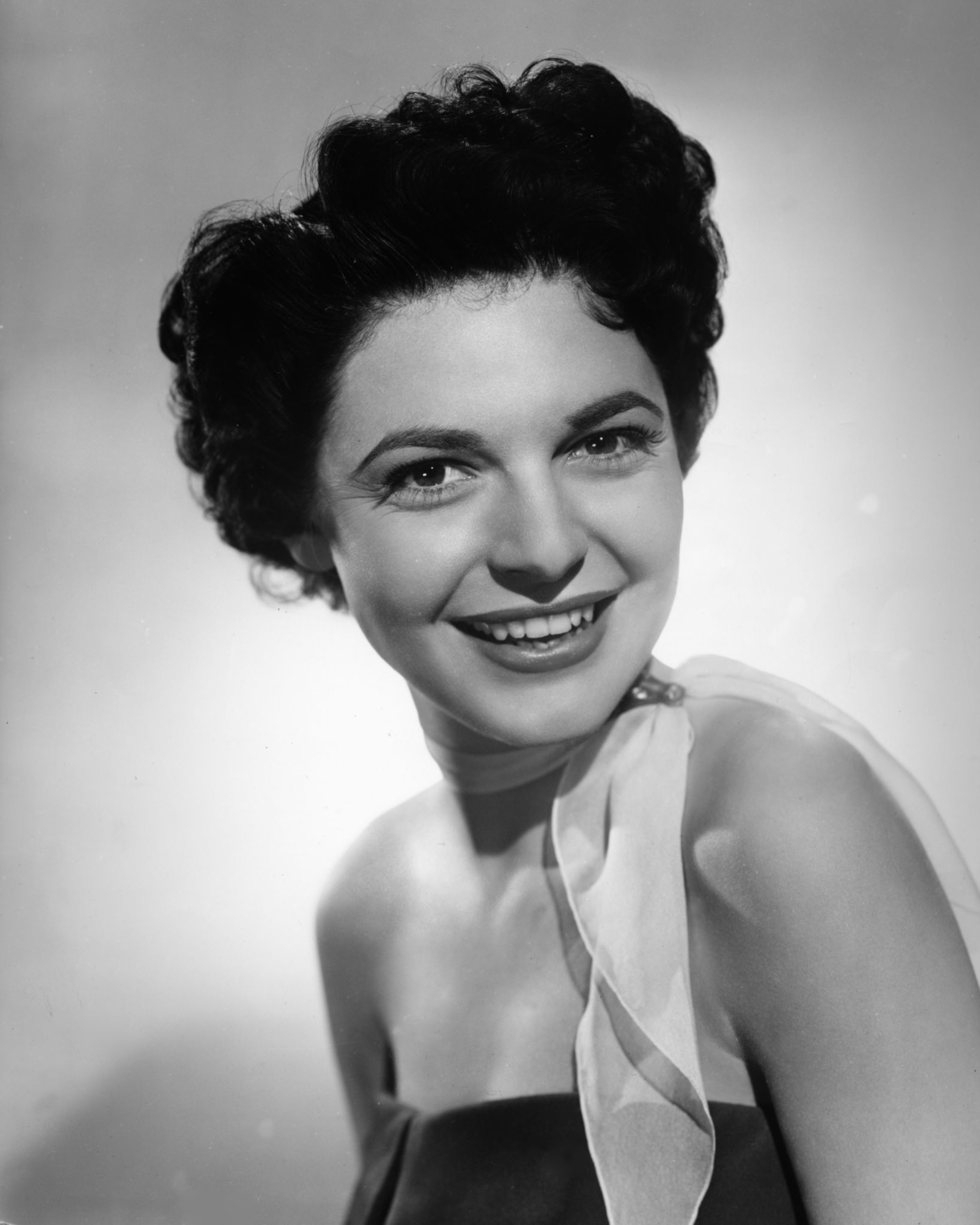
Anne Bancroft won thrice, for The Miracle Worker (1962), The Pumpkin Eater (1964), and 84 Charing Cross Road (1987).

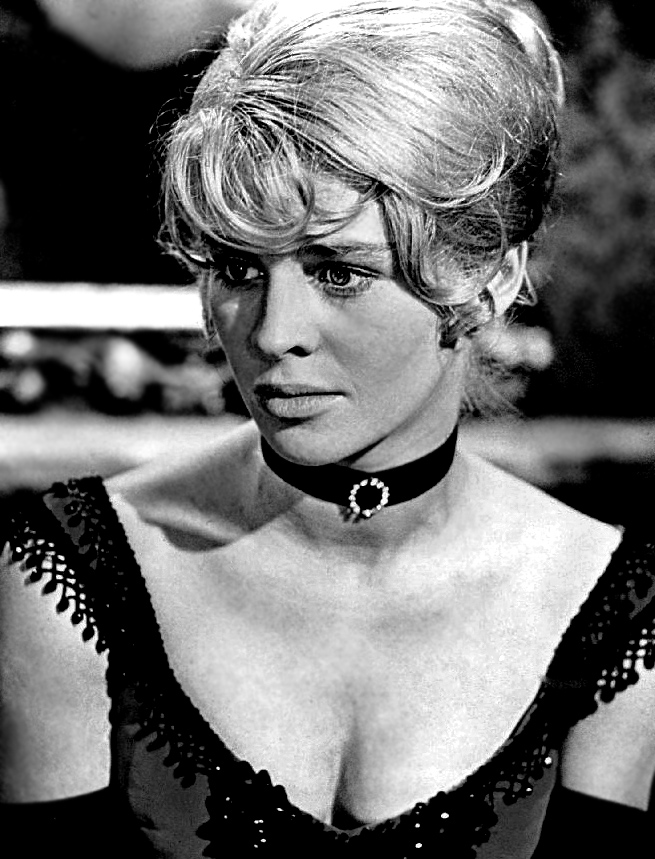
Julie Christie won for Darling (1965).

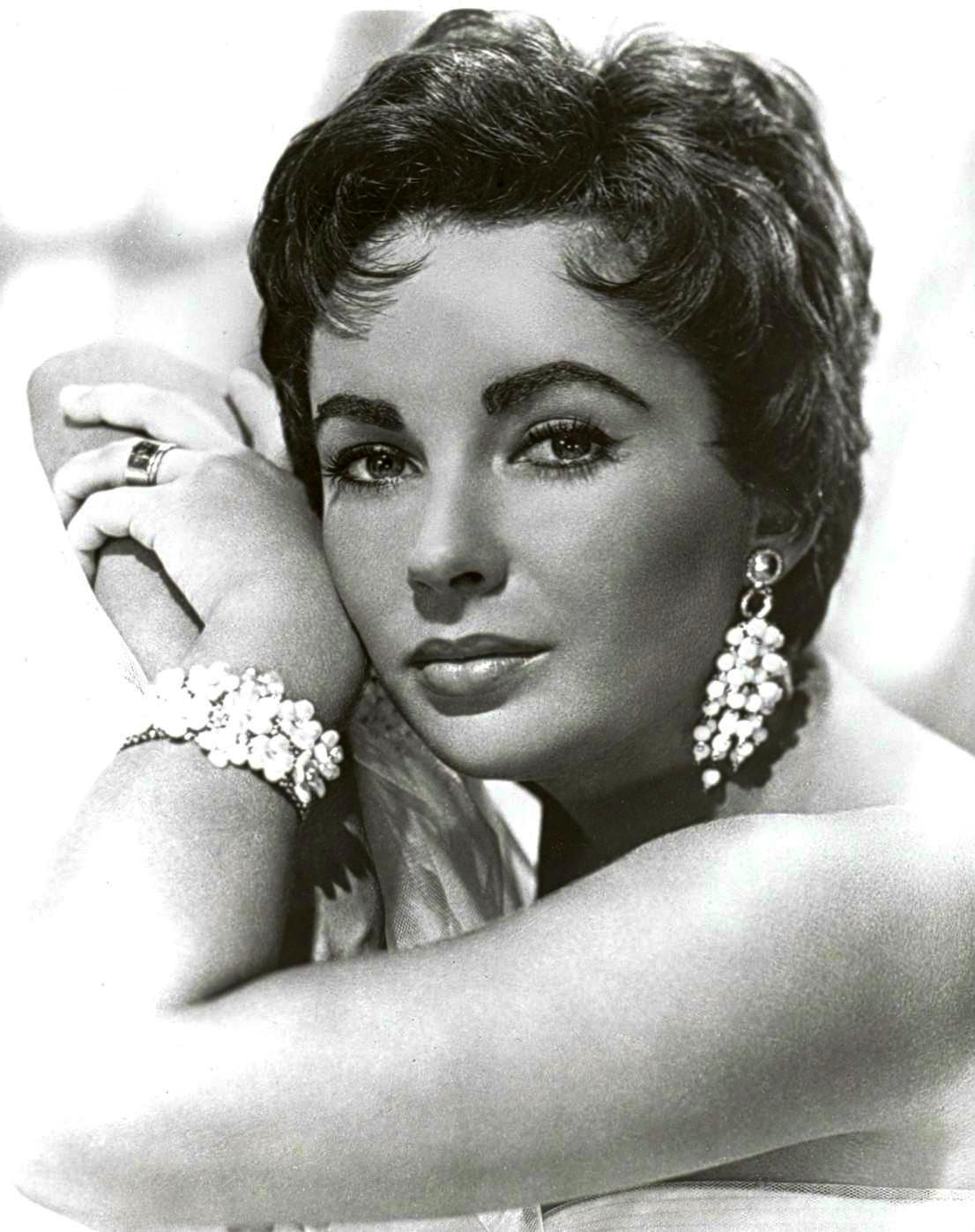
Elizabeth Taylor won for Who's Afraid of Virginia Woolf? (1966).

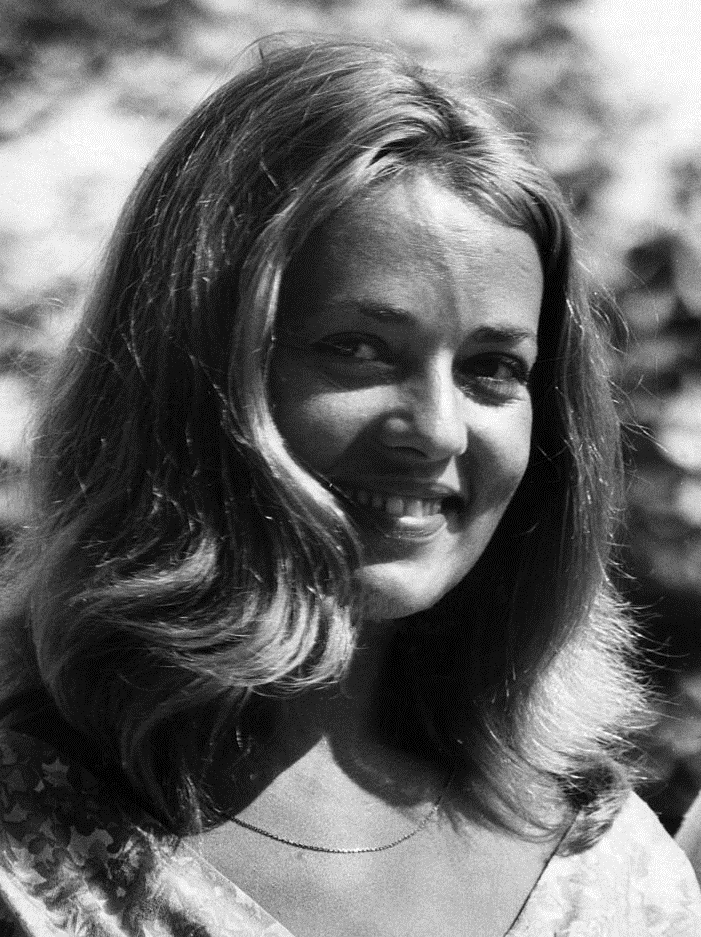
Jeanne Moreau won for Viva Maria! (1966)

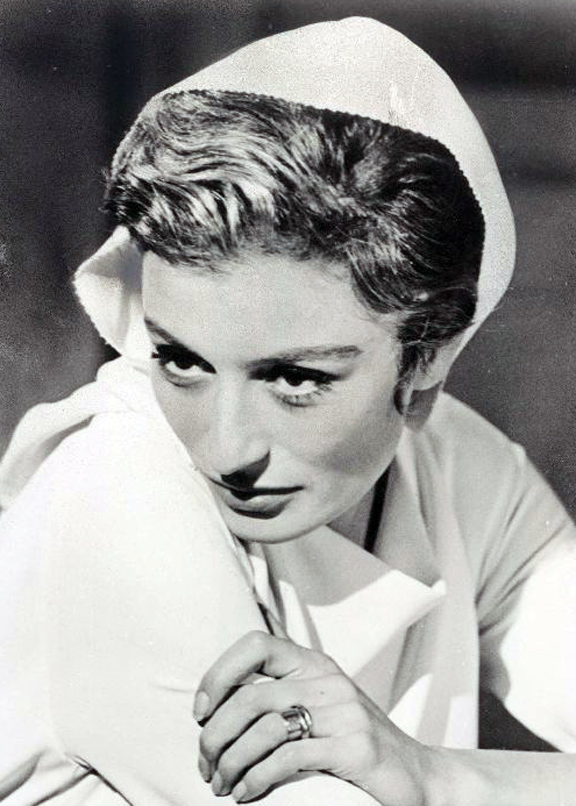
Anouk Aimee won for A Man and a Woman (1967)

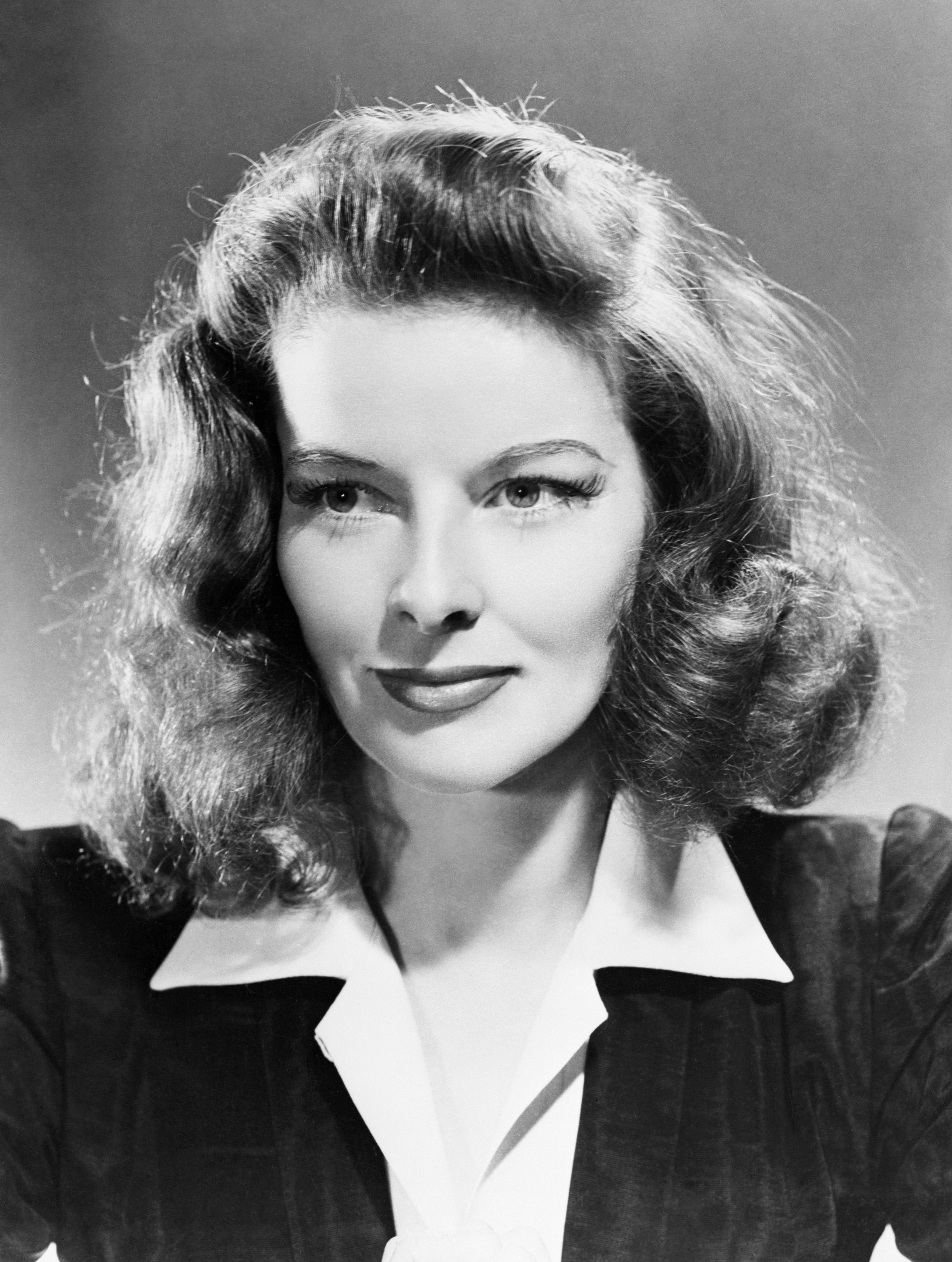
Katharine Hepburn won twice, for Guess Who's Coming to Dinner / The Lion in Winter (1968) and On Golden Pond (1981).

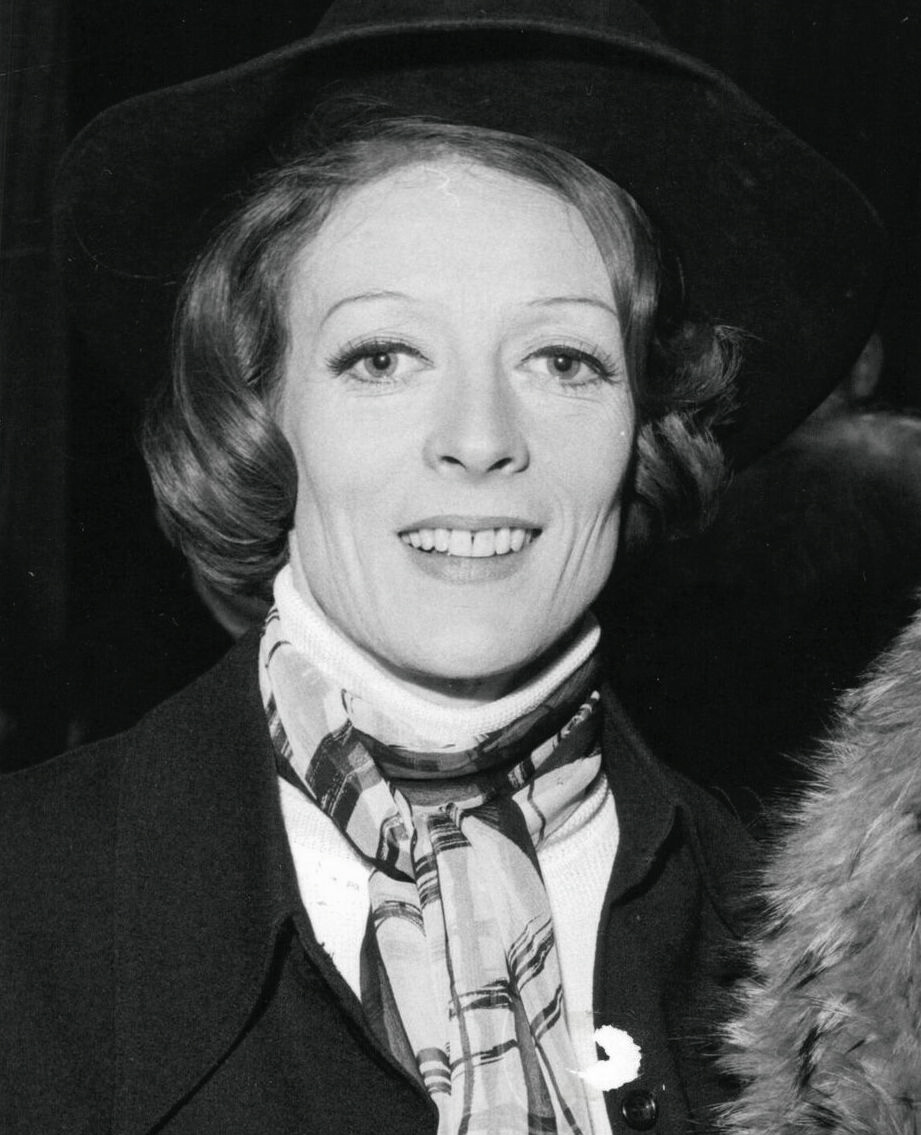
Maggie Smith won four times in 1969, 1984, 1985, and 1987.

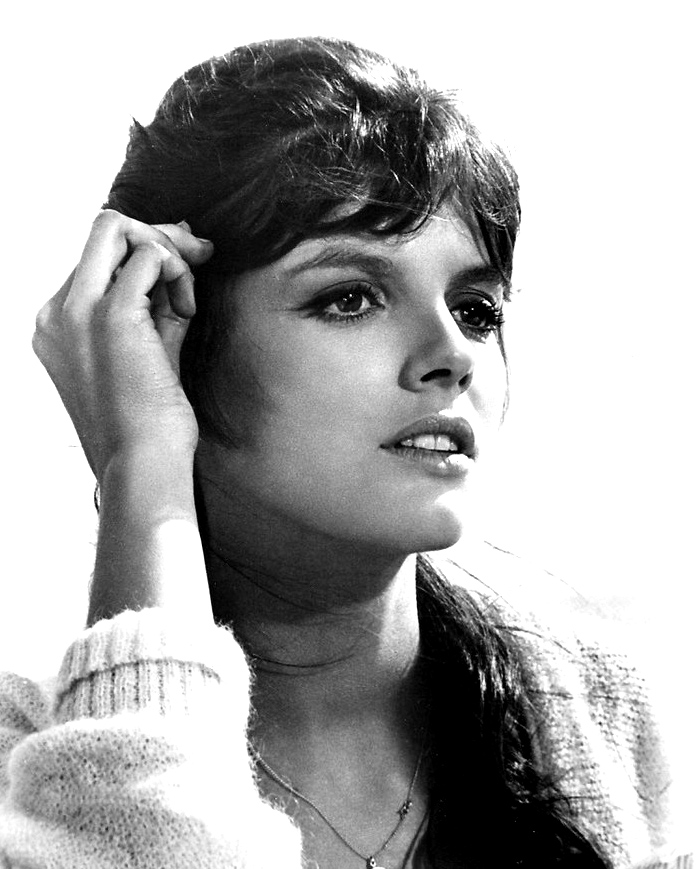
Katharine Ross won for Butch Cassidy and the Sundance Kid / Tell Them Willie Boy Is Here (1970).

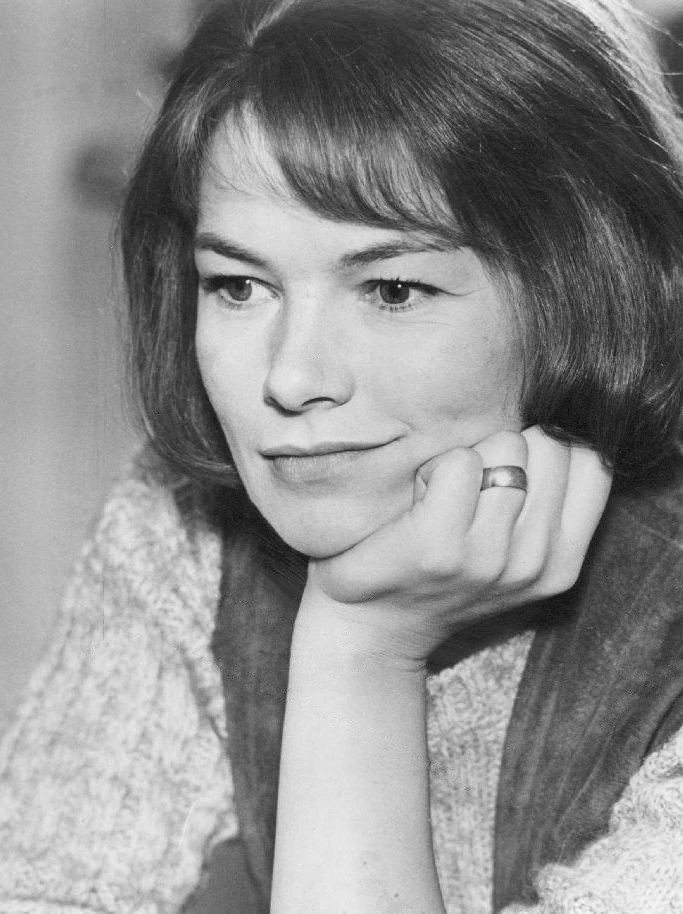
Glenda Jackson won for Sunday Bloody Sunday (1971).

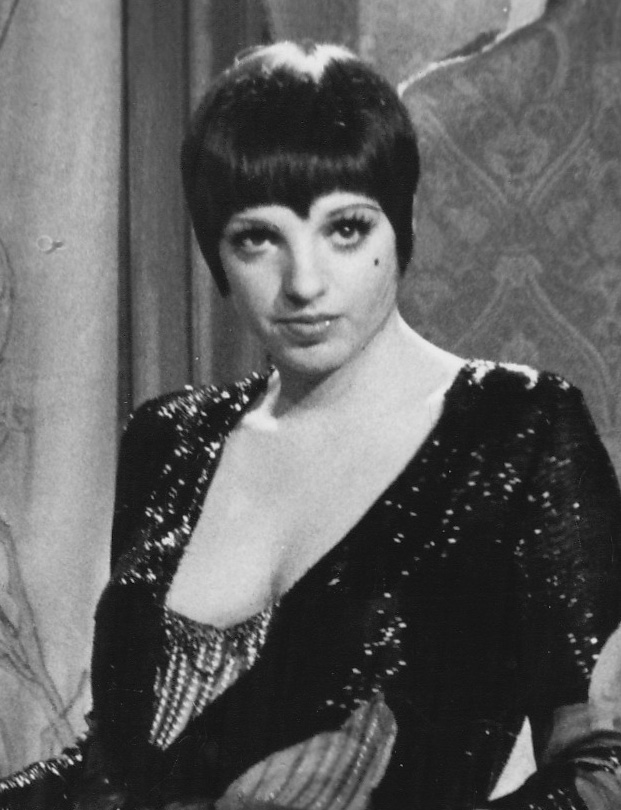
Liza Minnelli won for Cabaret (1972).

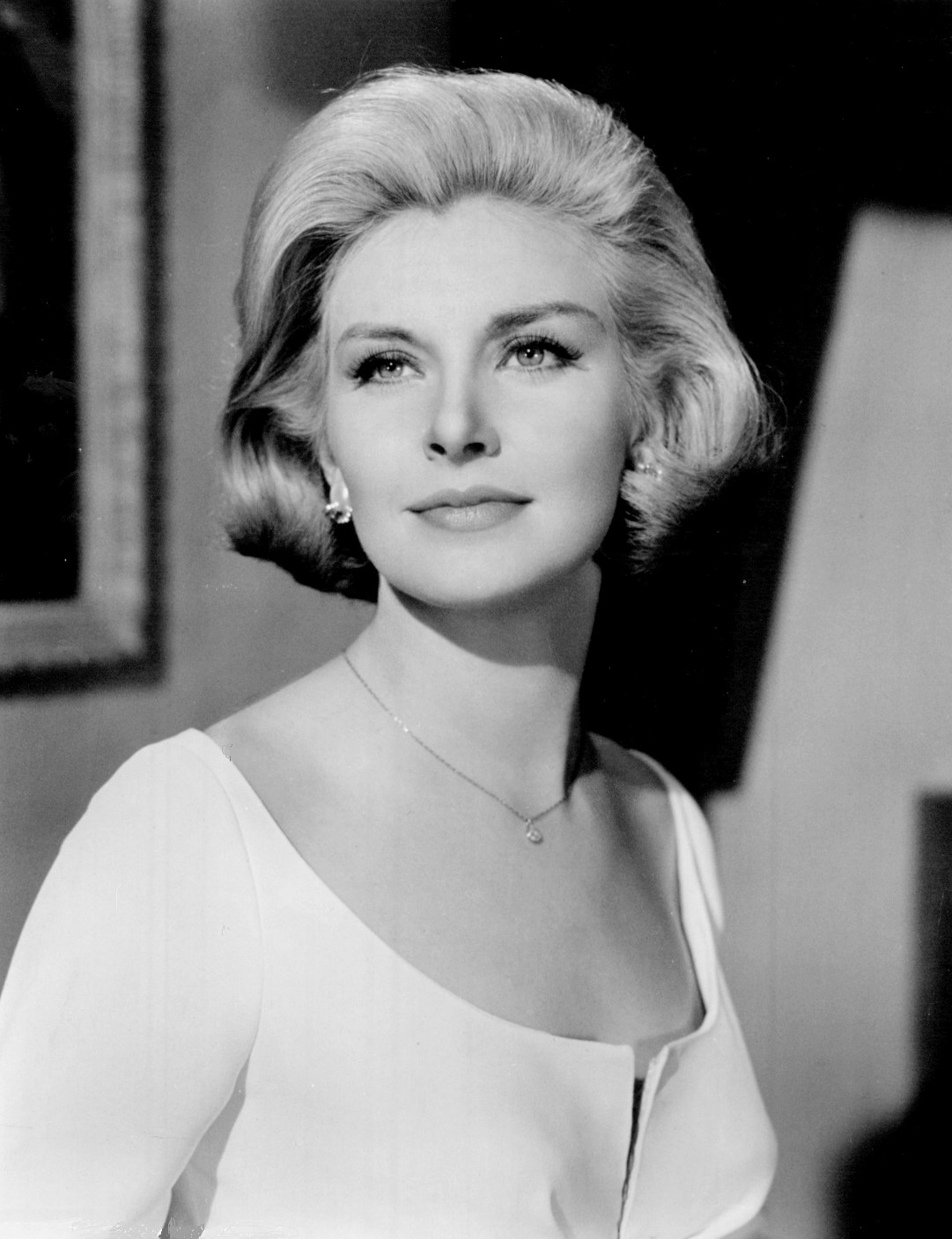
Joanne Woodward won for Summer Wishes, Winter Dreams (1973).

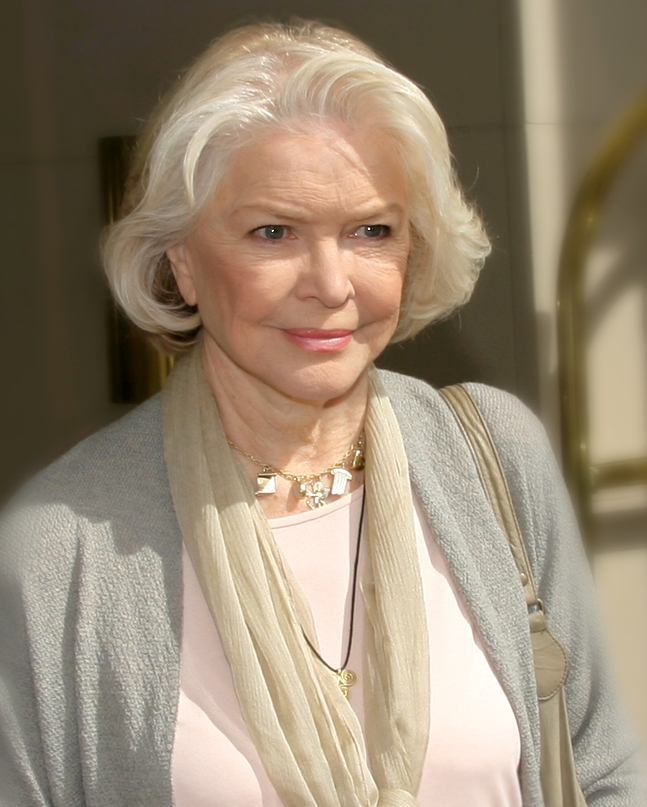
Ellen Burstyn won for Alice Doesn't Live Here Anymore (1974).

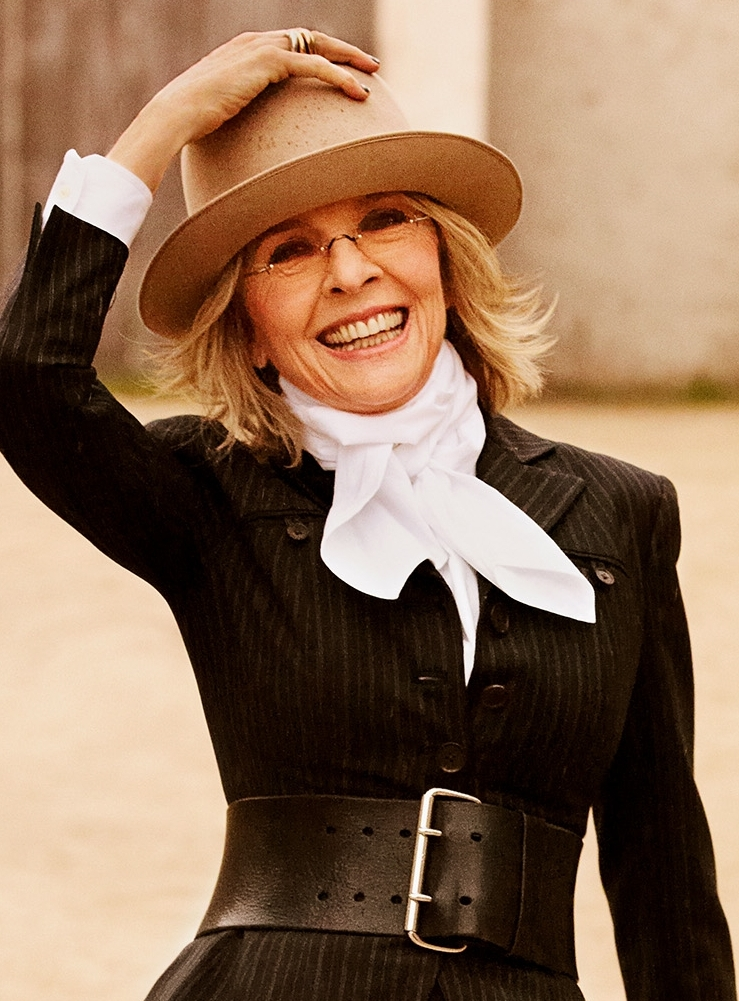
Diane Keaton won for Annie Hall (1977).

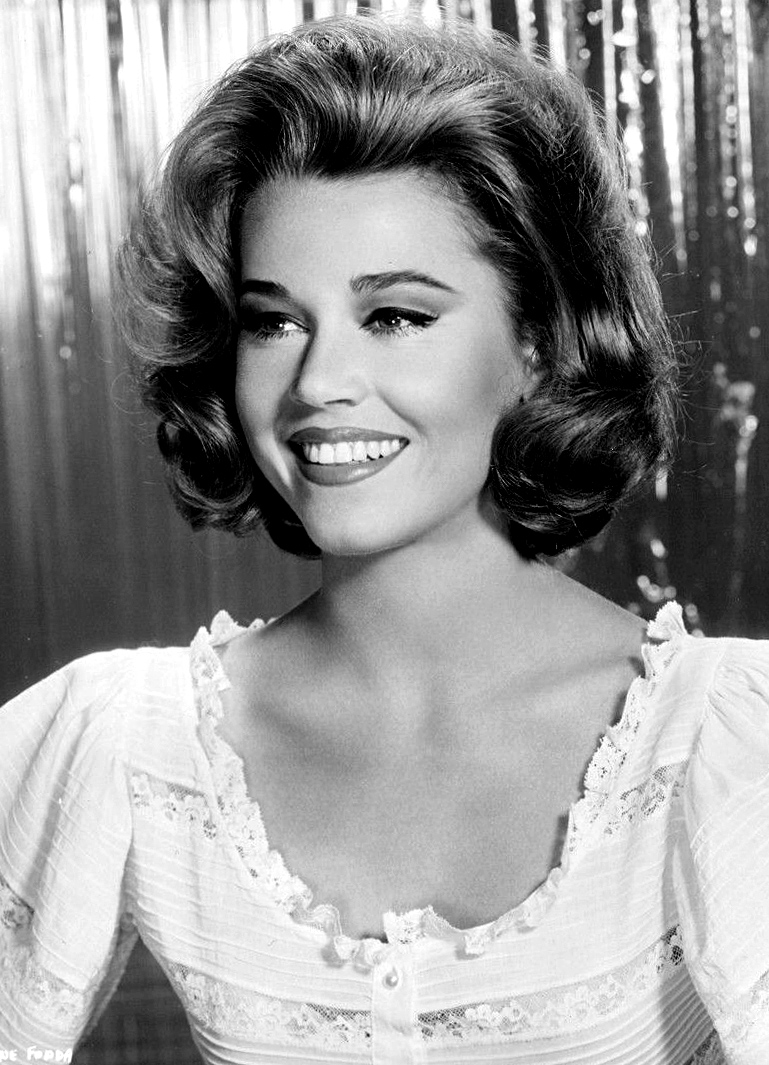
Jane Fonda won twice, for Julia (1977) and The China Syndrome (1978).

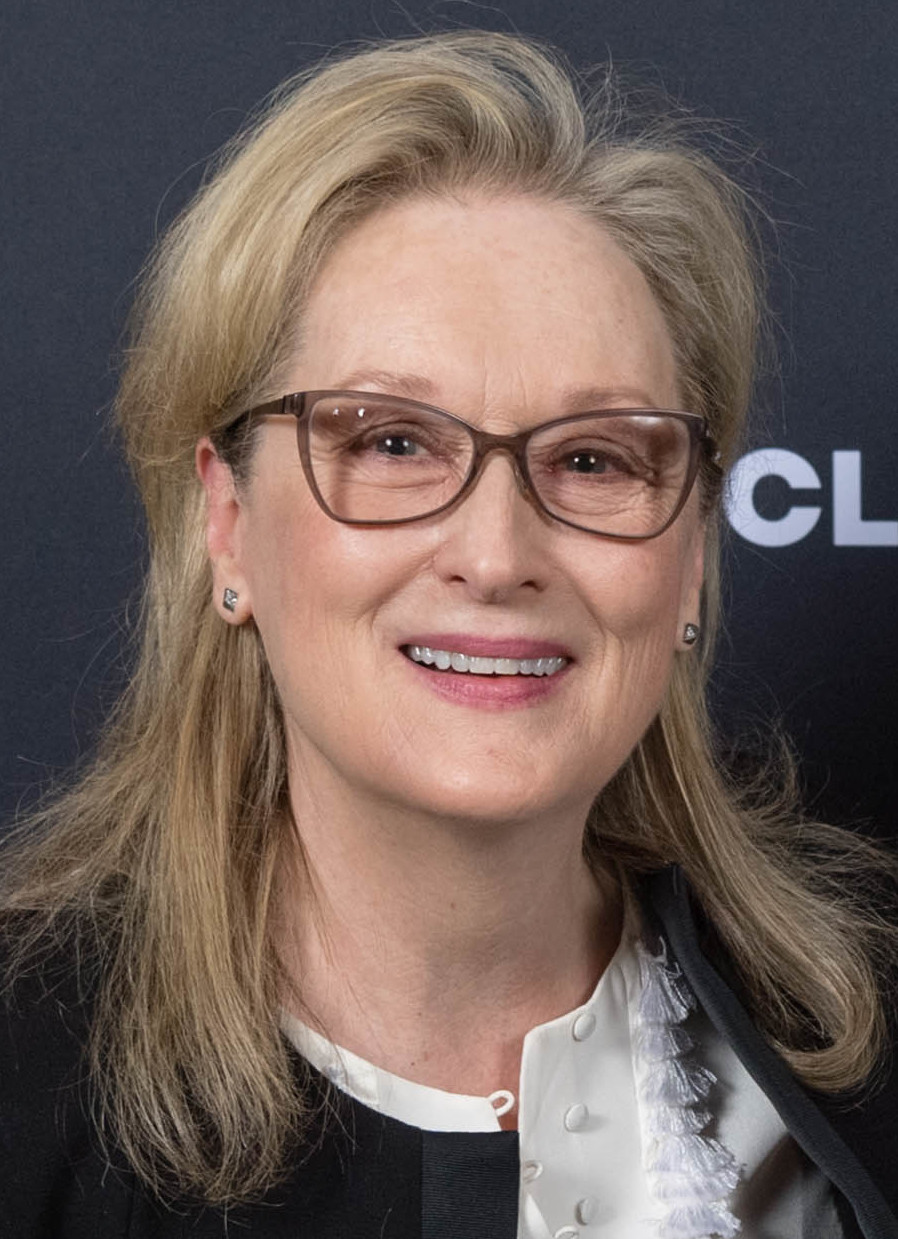
Meryl Streep twice for The French Lieutenant's Woman (1981) and The Iron Lady (2011).

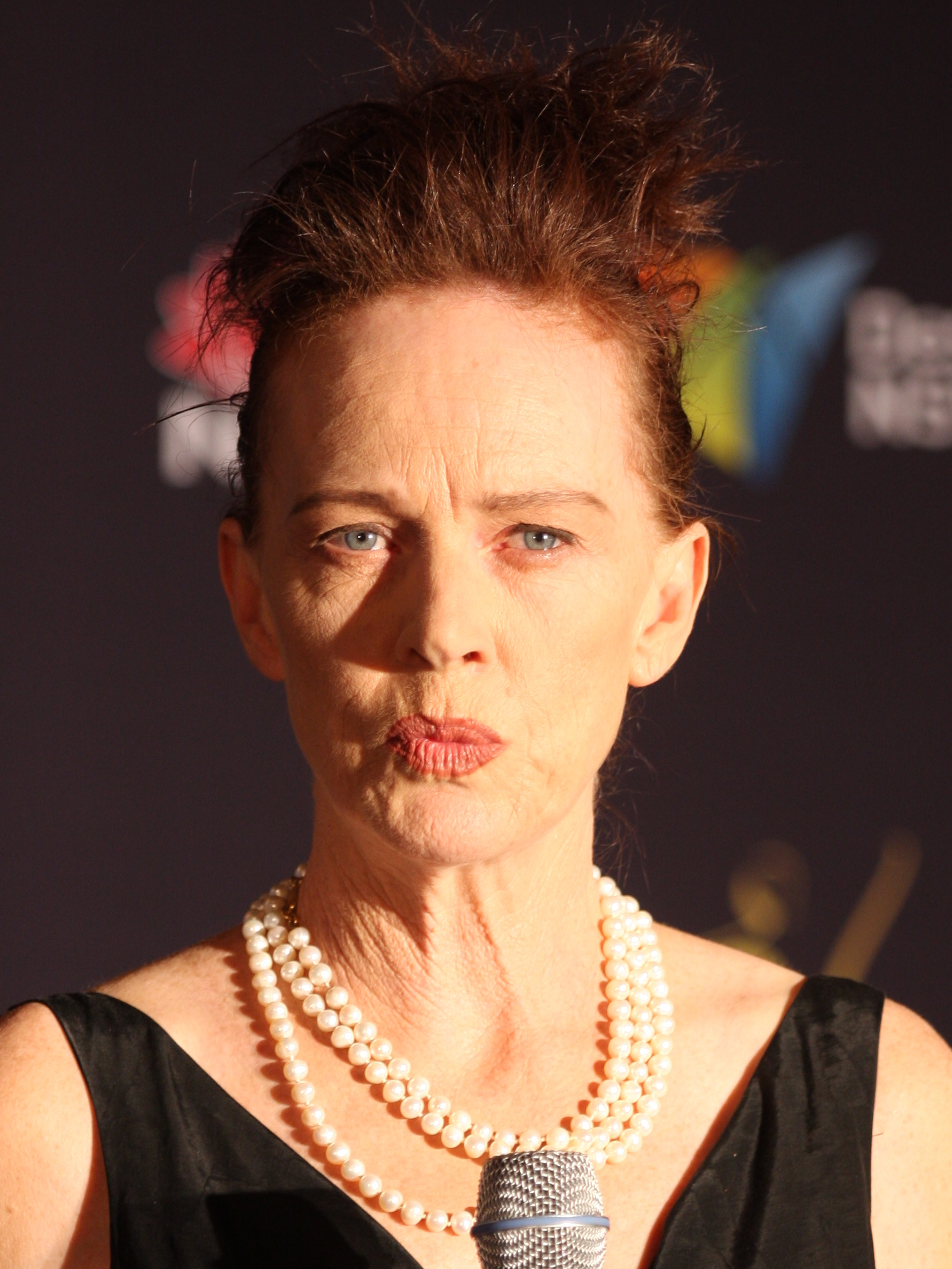
Judy Davis won for My Brilliant Career (1980)

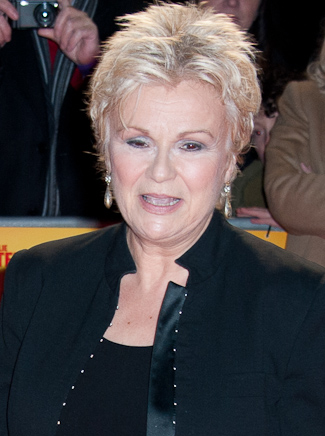
Julie Walters won for Educating Rita (1983).

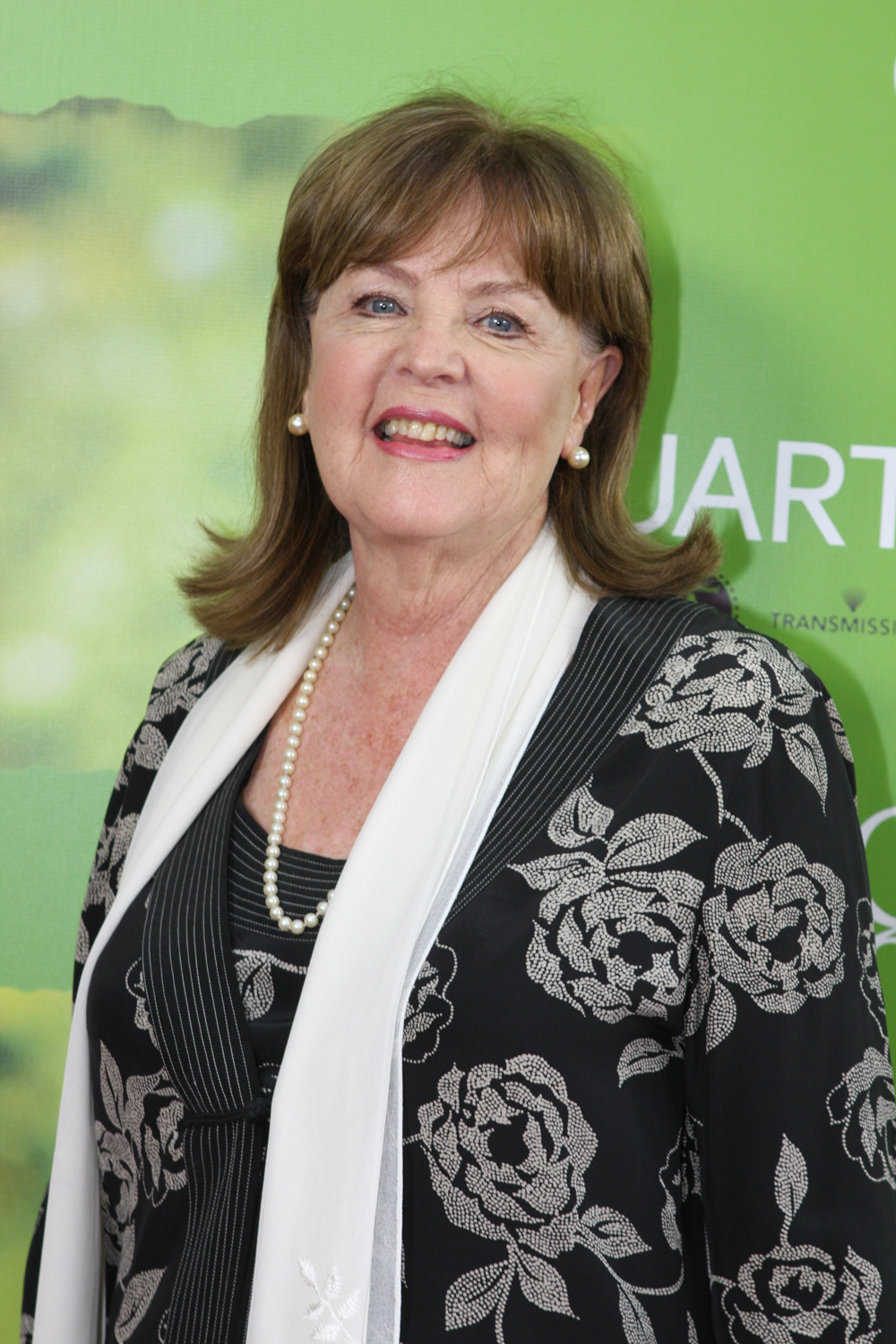
Pauline Collins won for Shirley Valentine (1989)

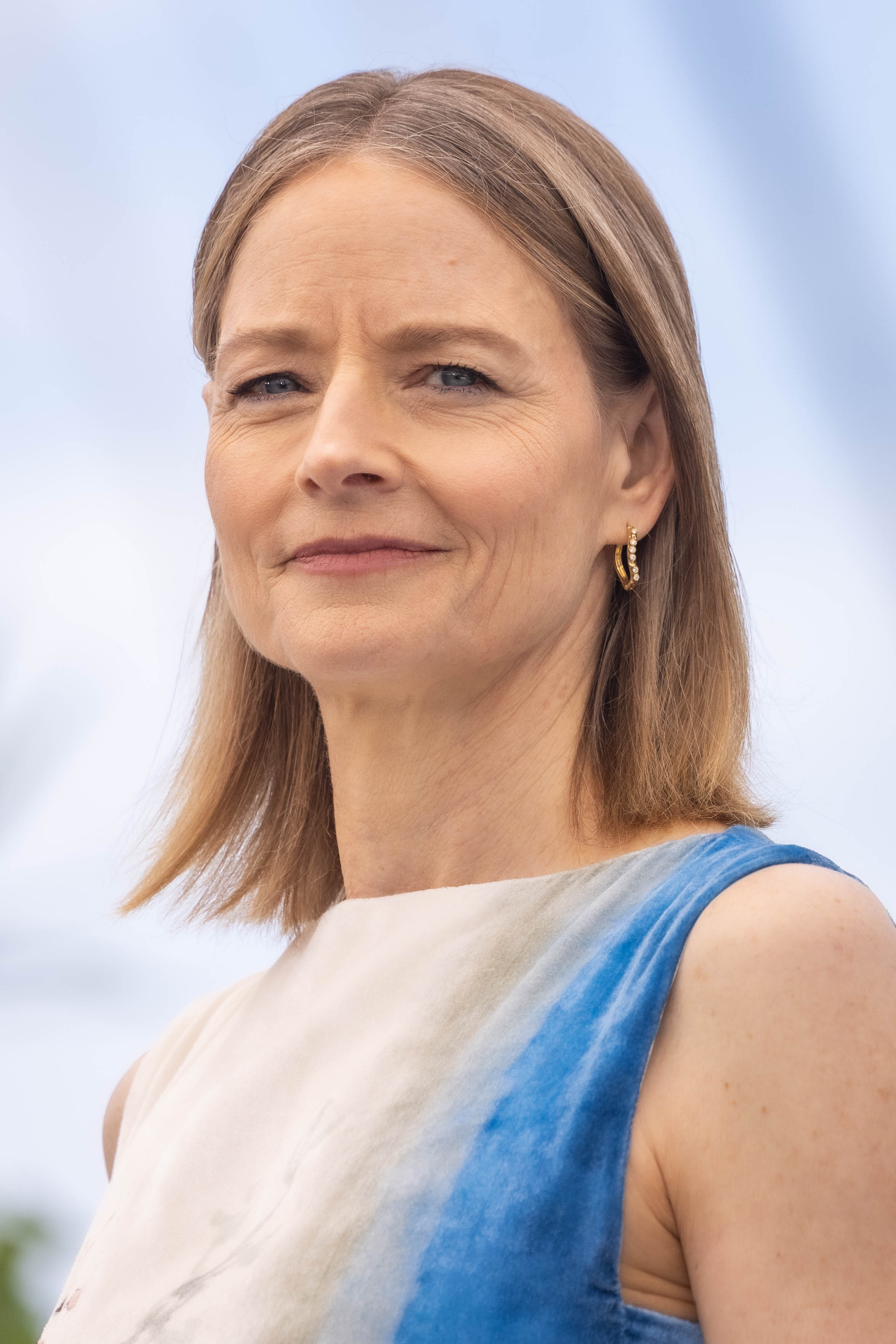
Jodie Foster won for The Silence of the Lambs (1991).

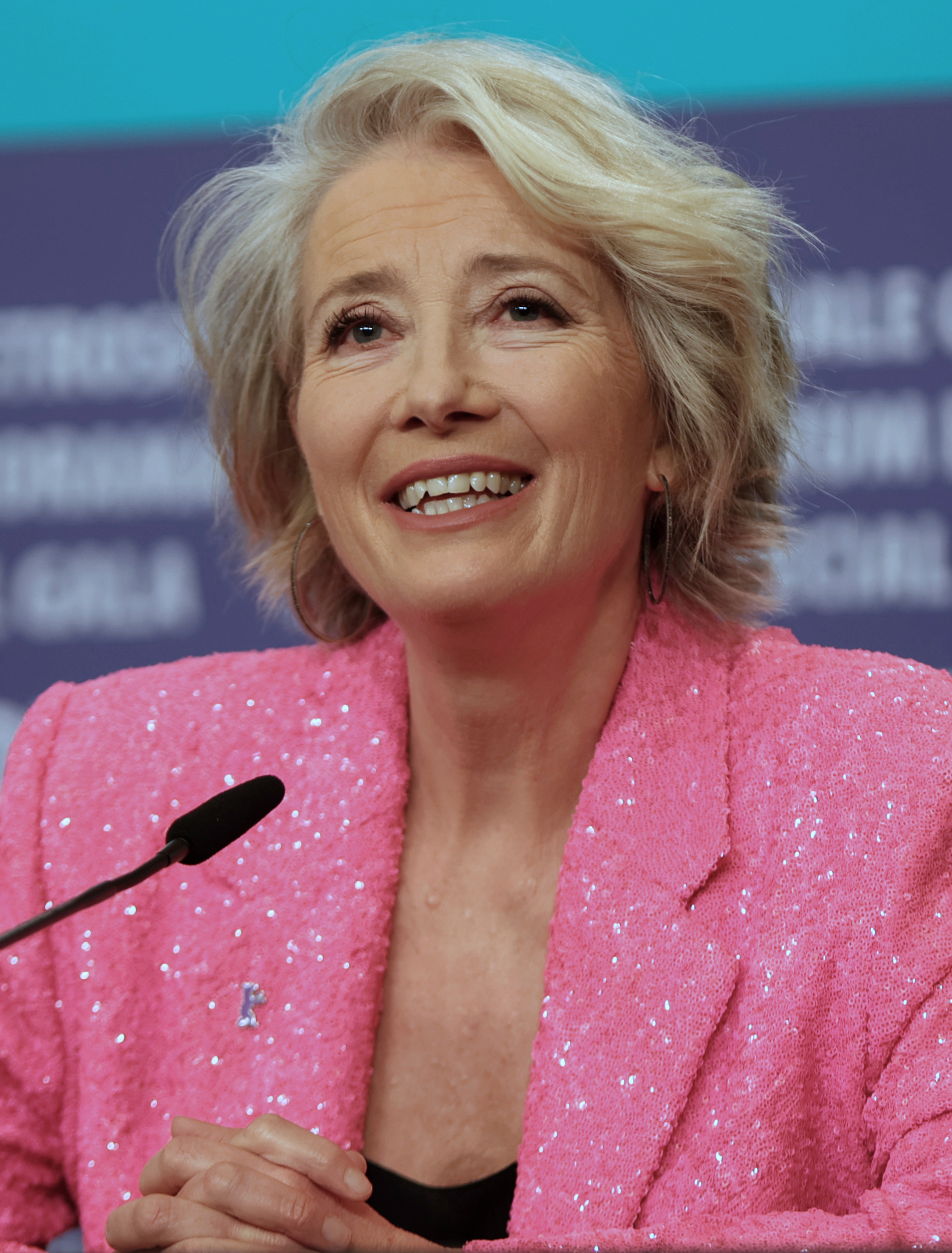
Emma Thompson won twice, for Howards End (1992) and Sense and Sensibility (1995).

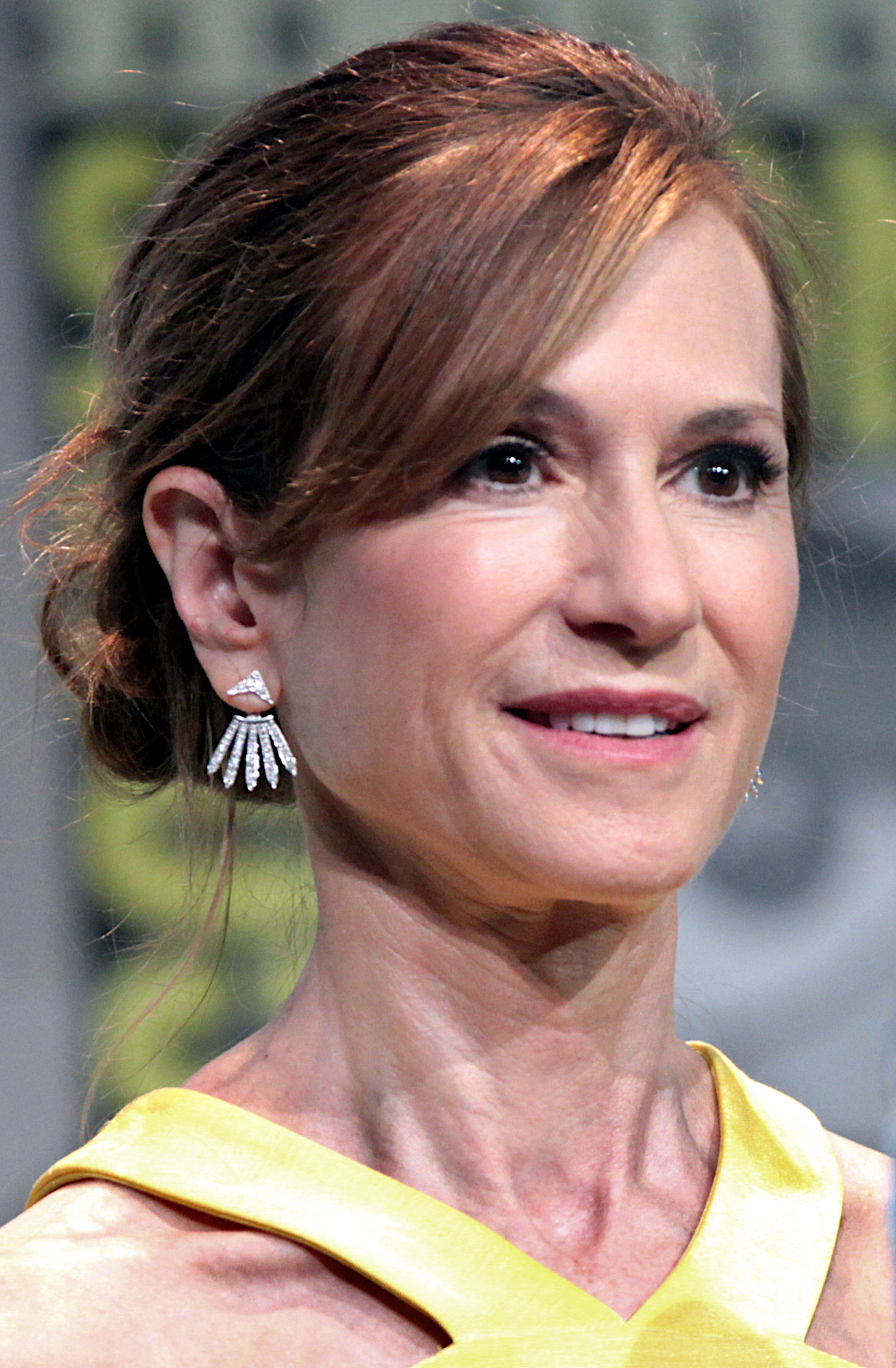
Holly Hunter won for The Piano (1993).

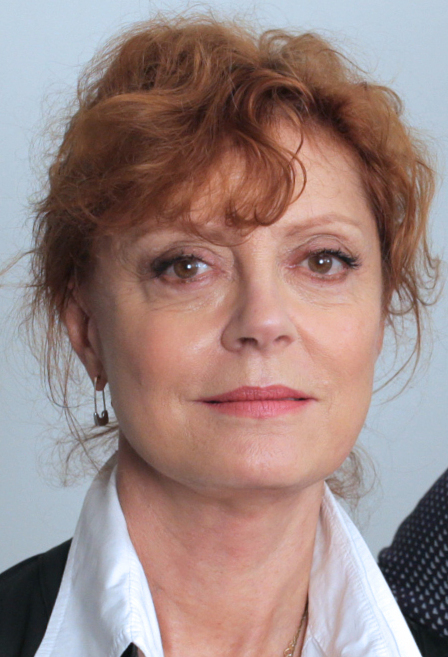
Susan Sarandon won for The Client (1994).

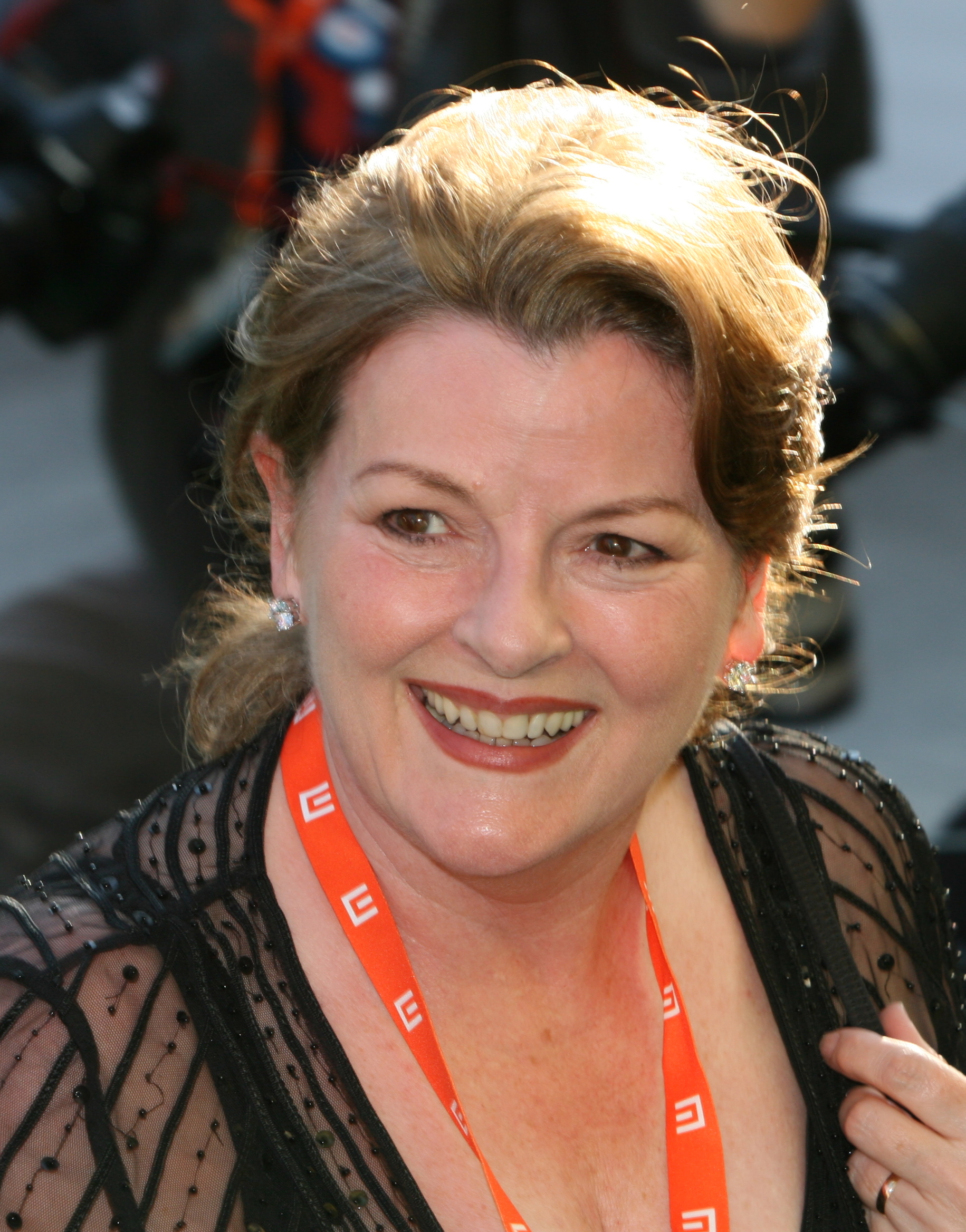
Brenda Blethyn won for Secrets & Lies (1996).

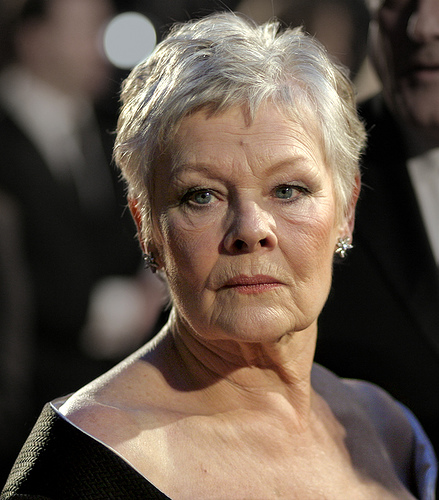
Judi Dench won twice, for Mrs Brown (1997) and Iris (2001).

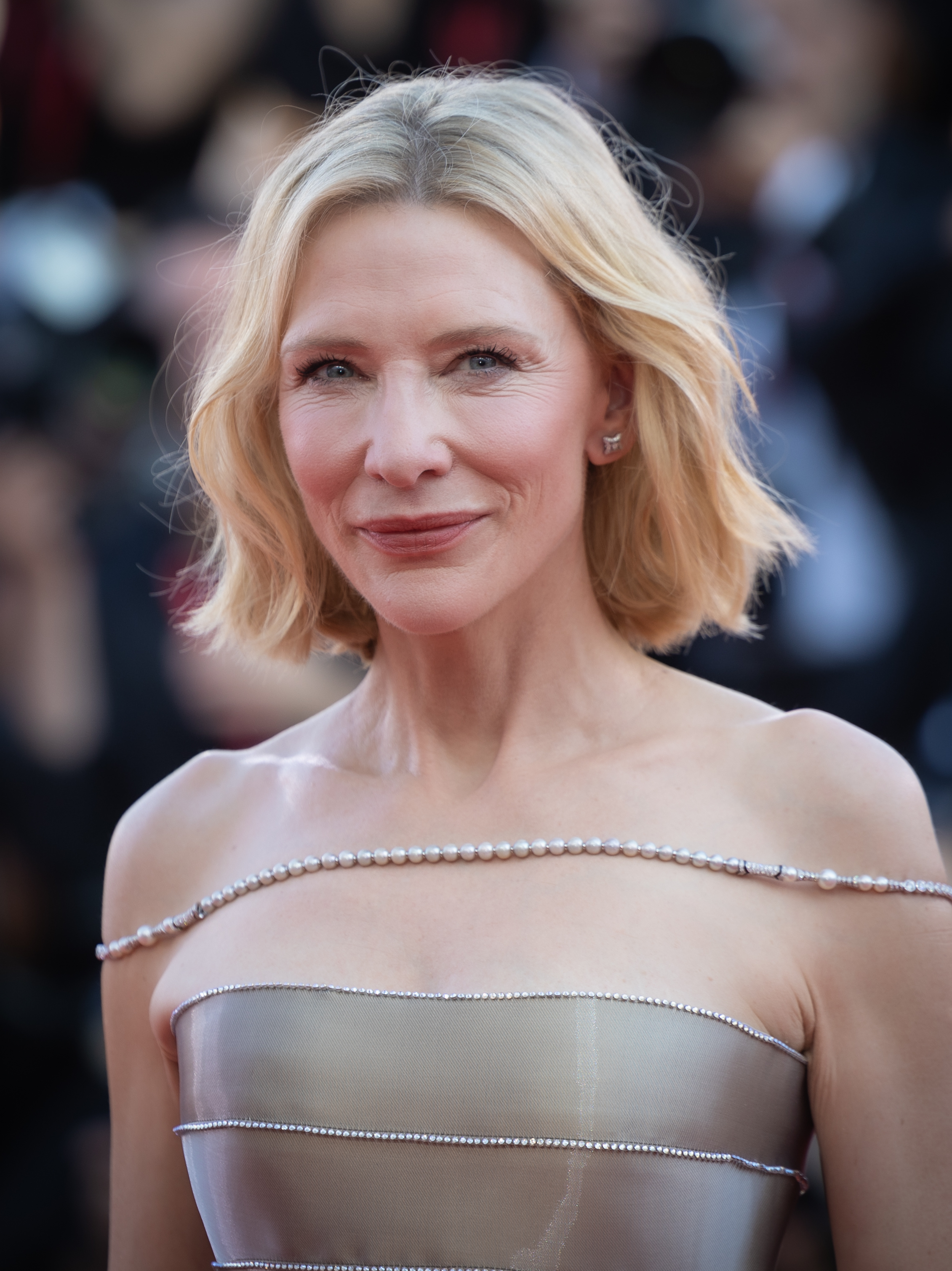
Cate Blanchett won thrice, for Elizabeth (1998), Blue Jasmine (2013), and Tár (2022).

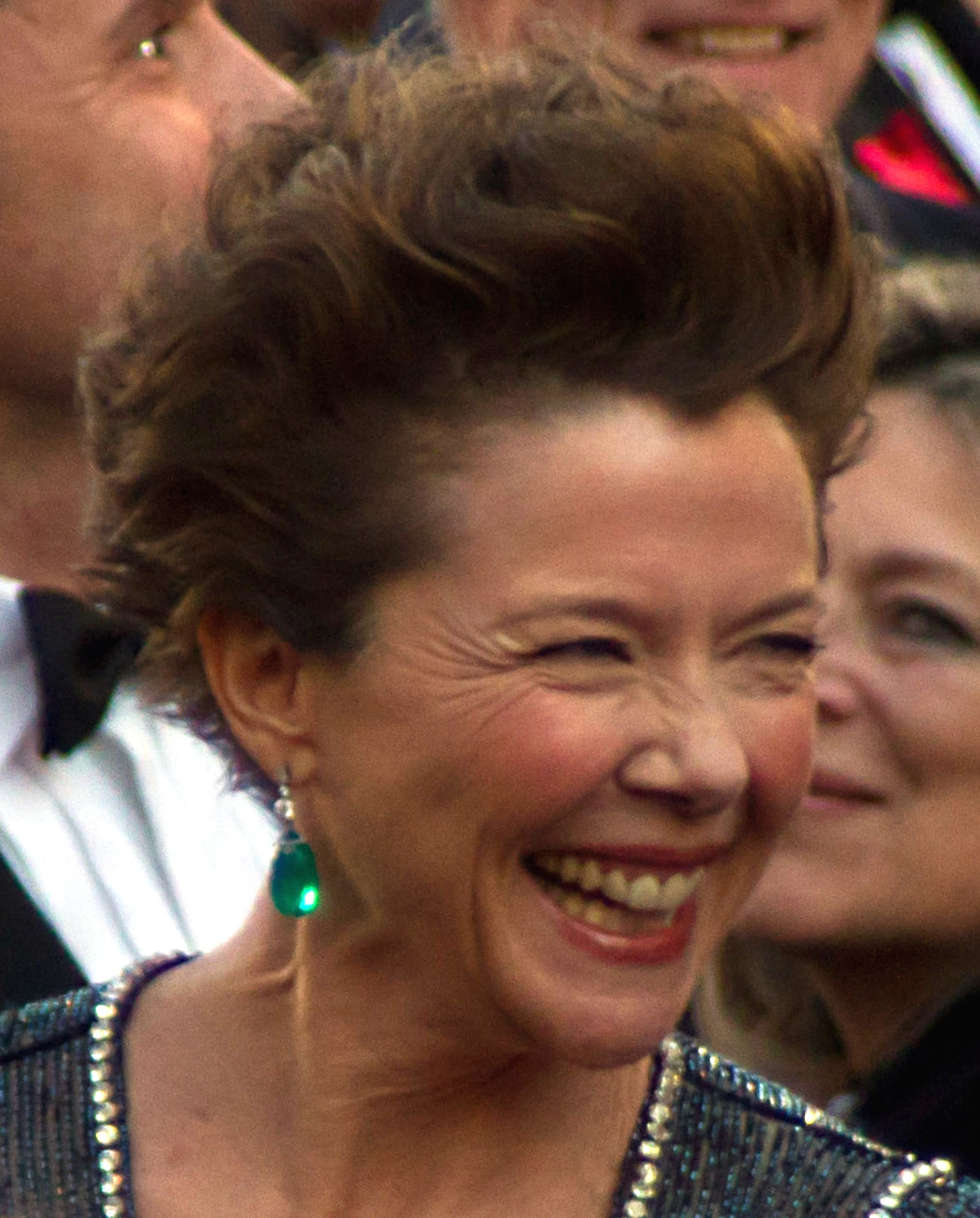
Annette Bening won for American Beauty (1999).

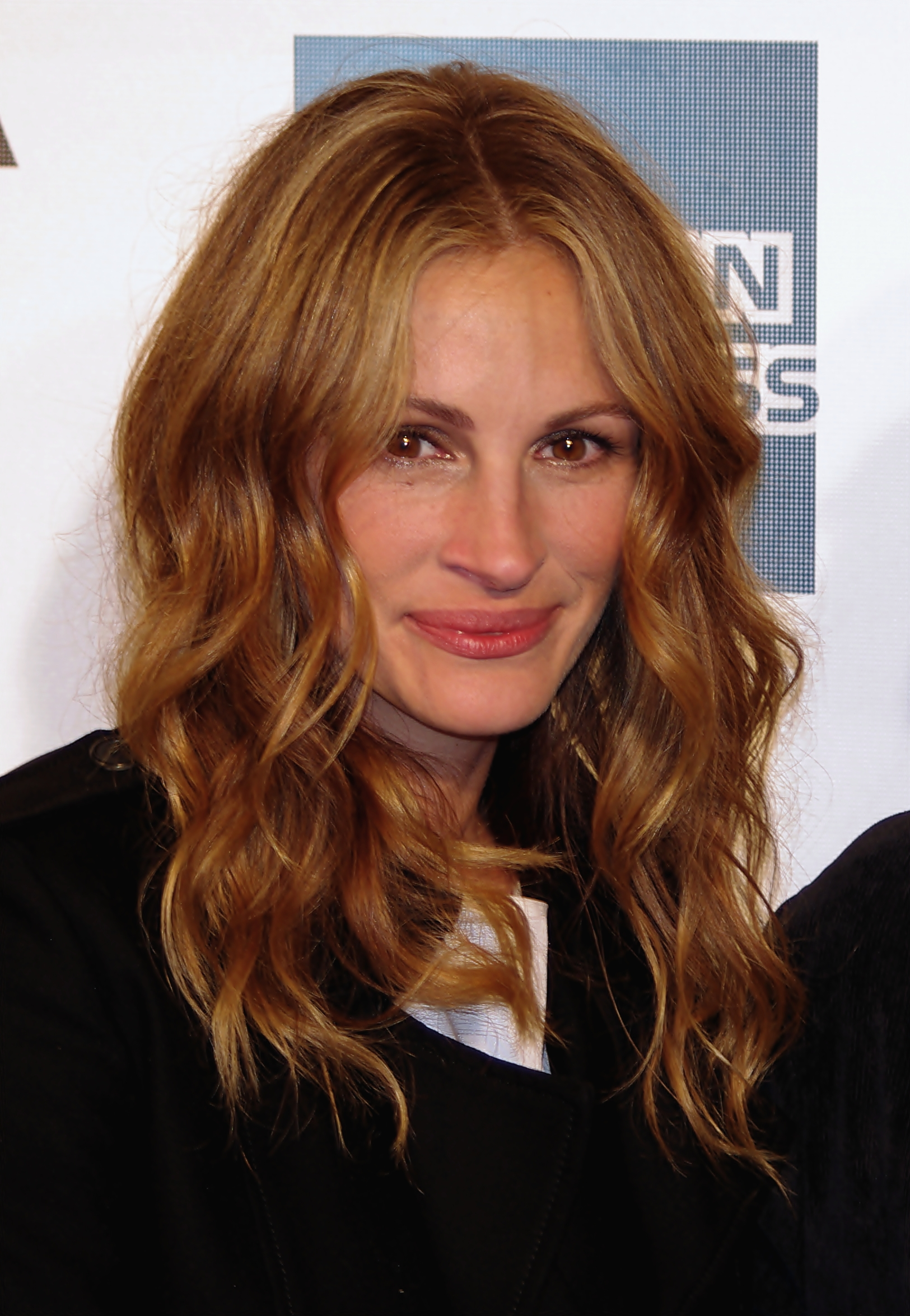
Julia Roberts won for Erin Brockovich (2000).

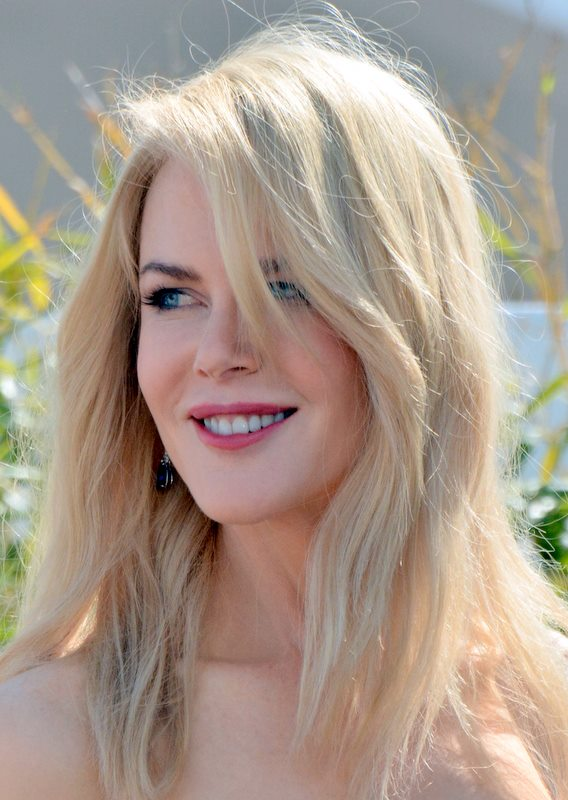
Nicole Kidman won for The Hours (2002).

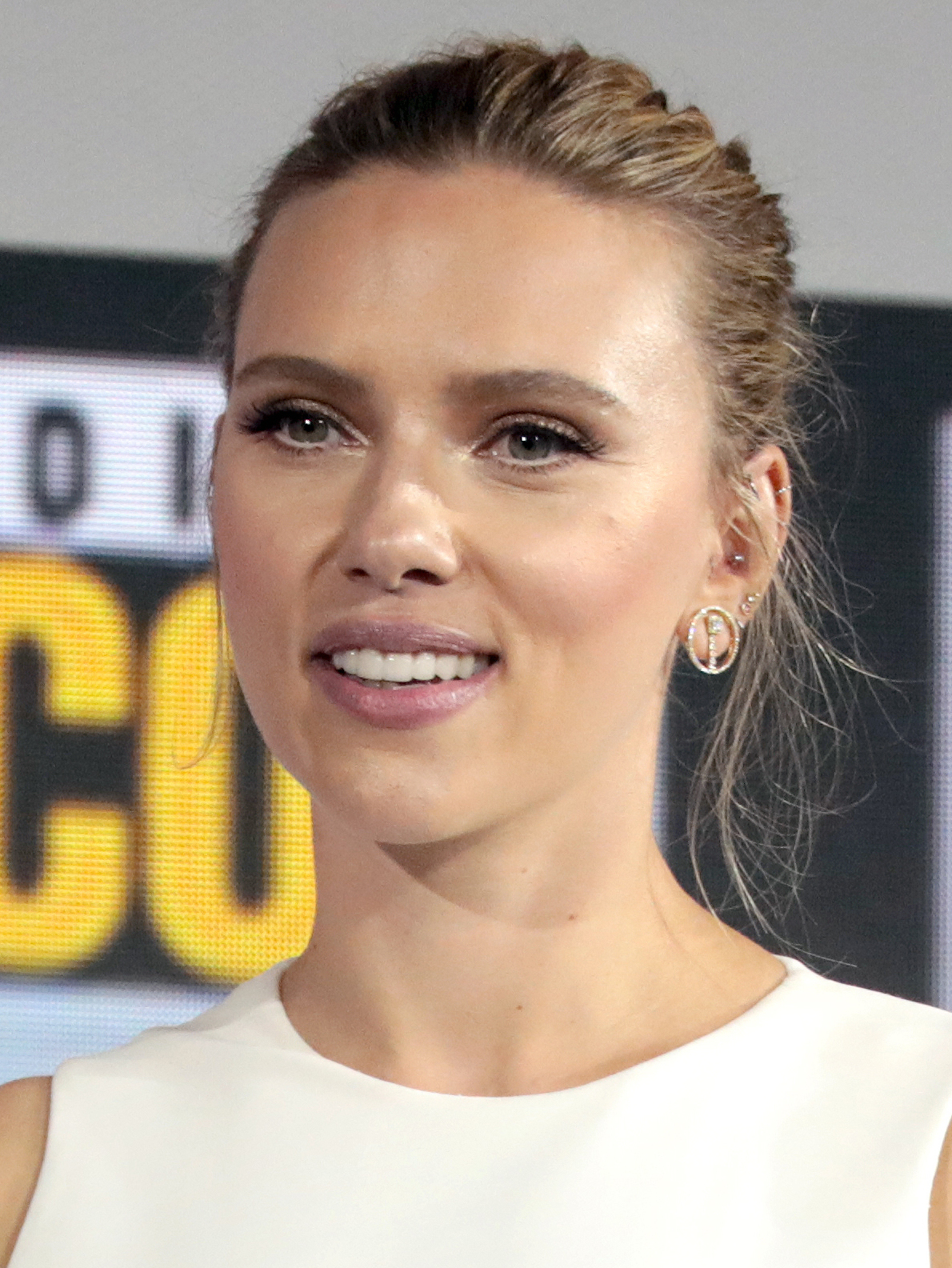
Scarlett Johansson won for Lost in Translation (2003).

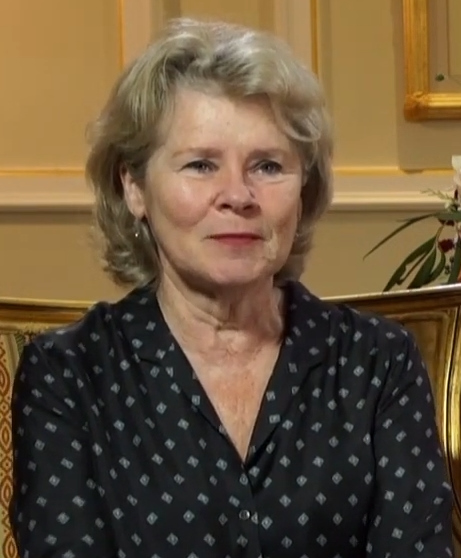
Imelda Staunton won for Vera Drake (2004)

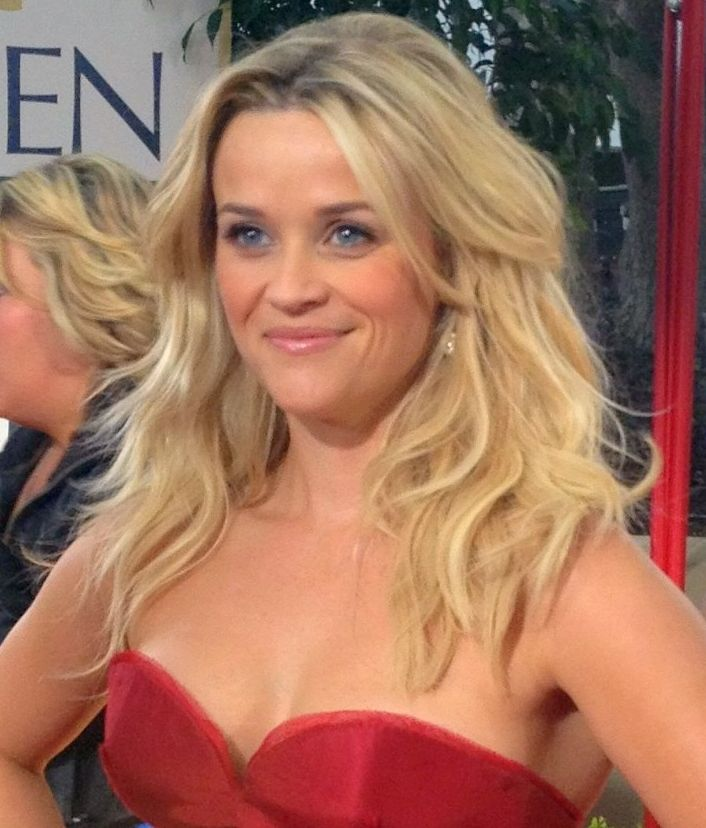
Reese Witherspoon won for Walk the Line (2005).

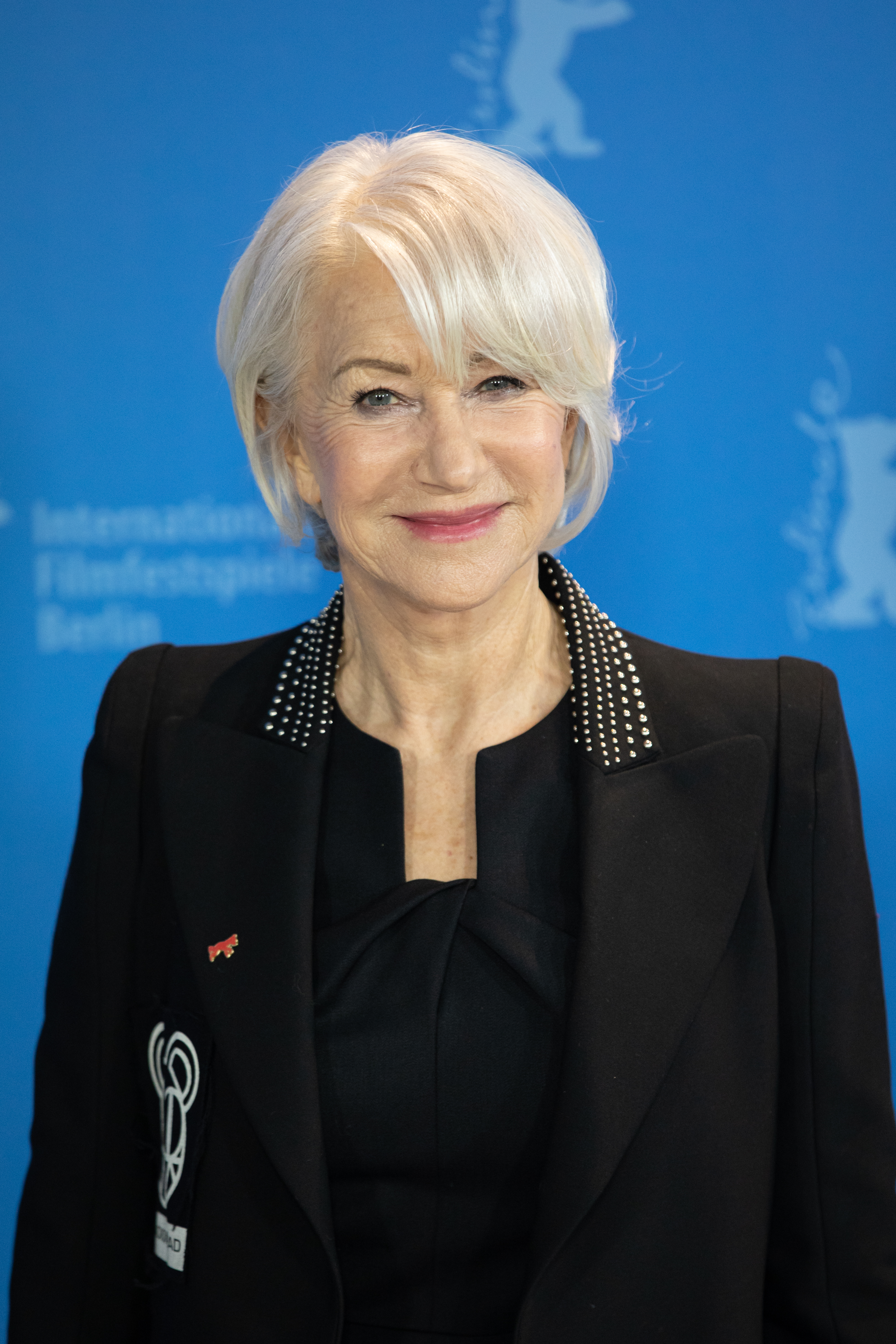
Helen Mirren won for The Queen (2006).

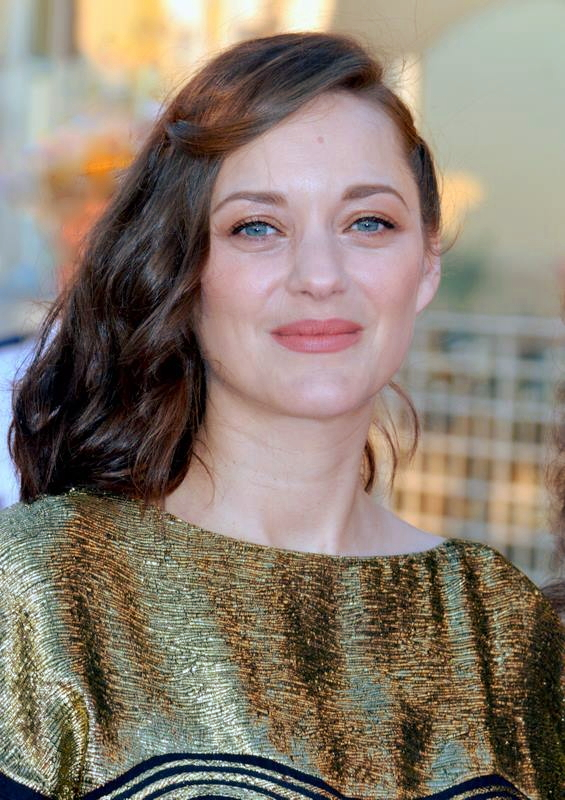
Marion Cotillard won for La Vie en Rose (2007).

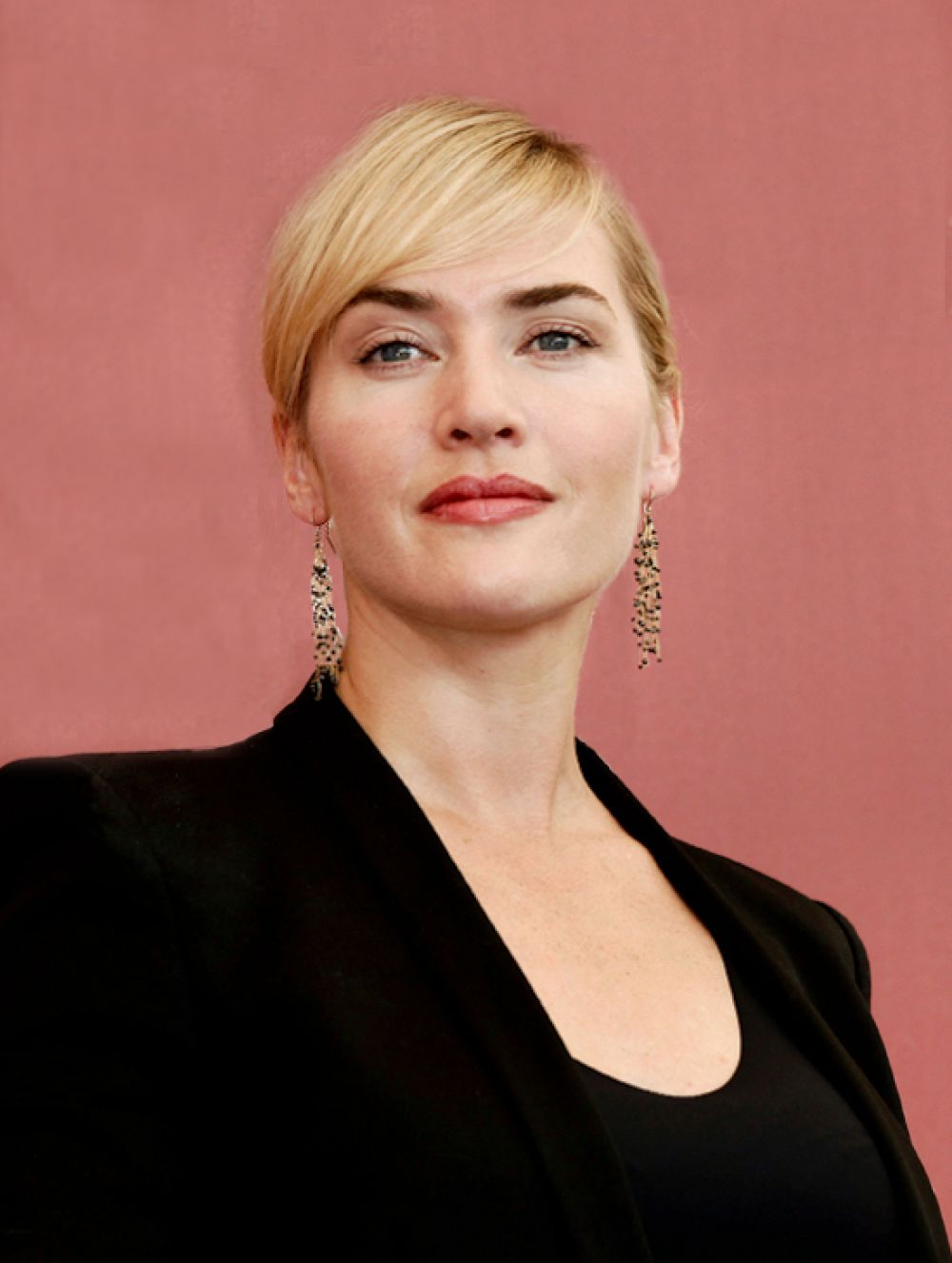
Kate Winslet won for The Reader (2008).

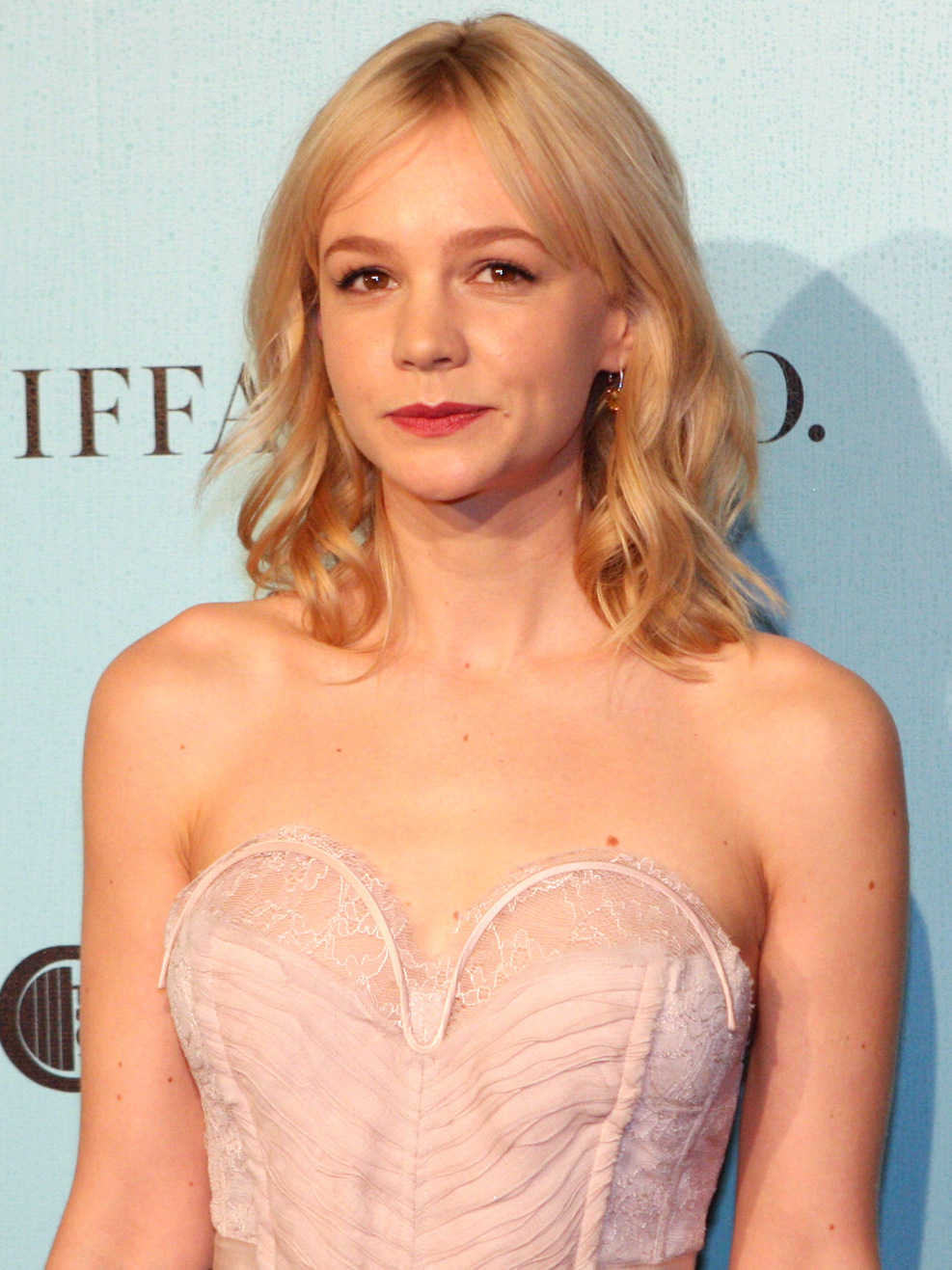
Carey Mulligan won for An Education (2009).

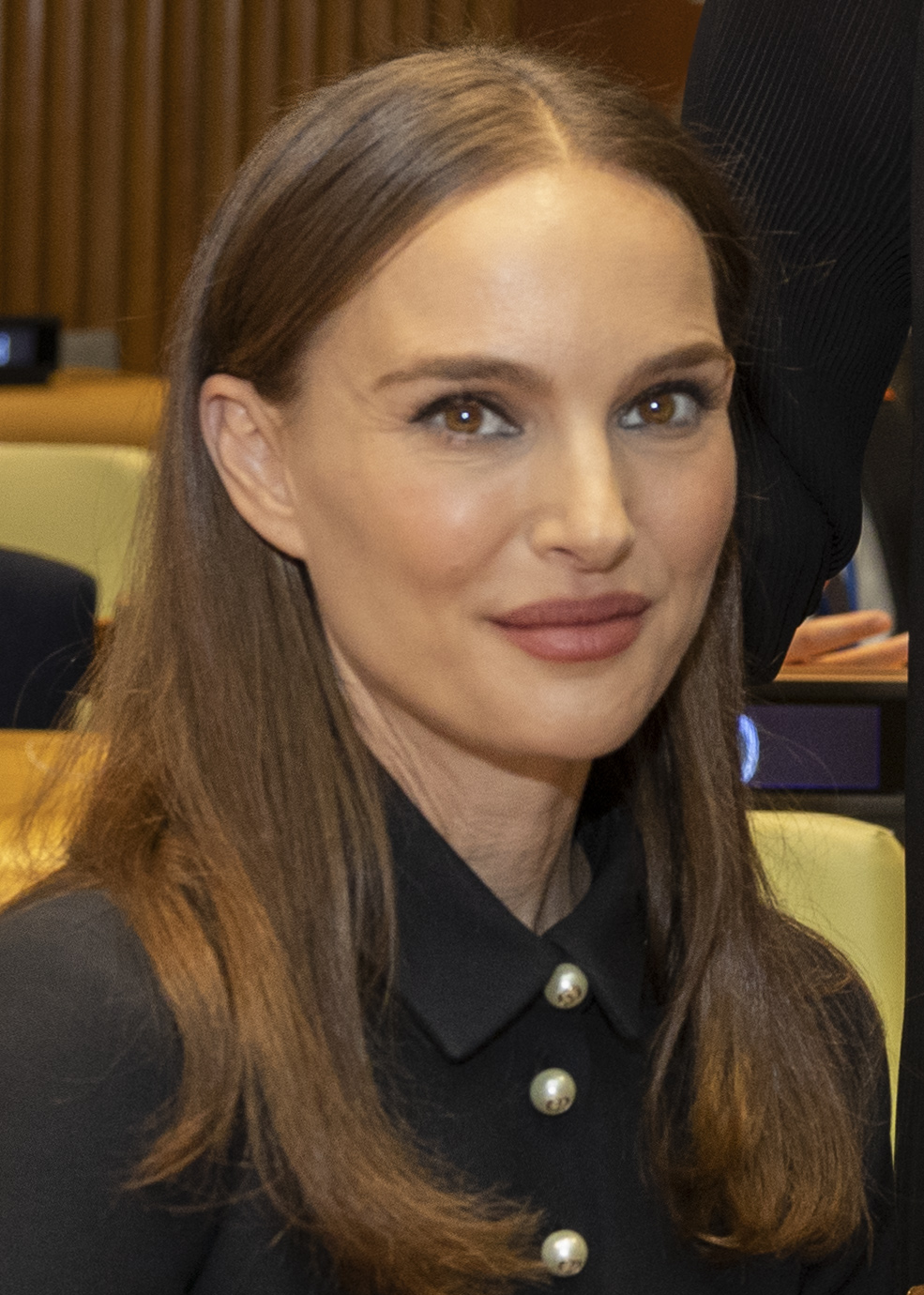
Natalie Portman won for Black Swan (2010).

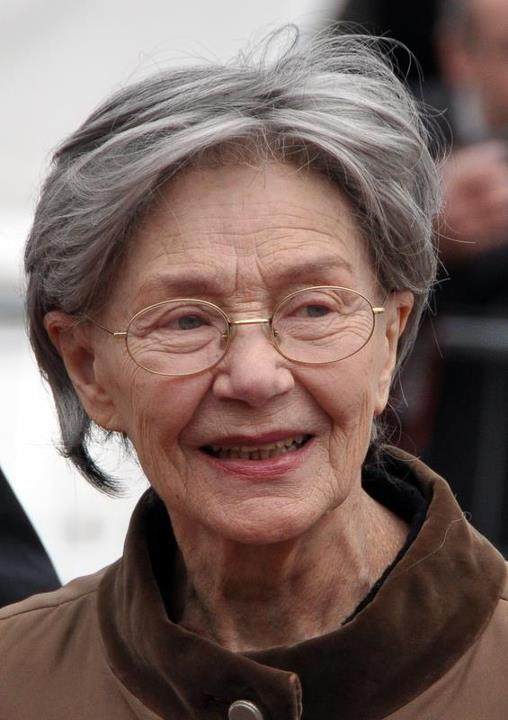
Emmanuelle Riva won at age 85 for Amour (2012)

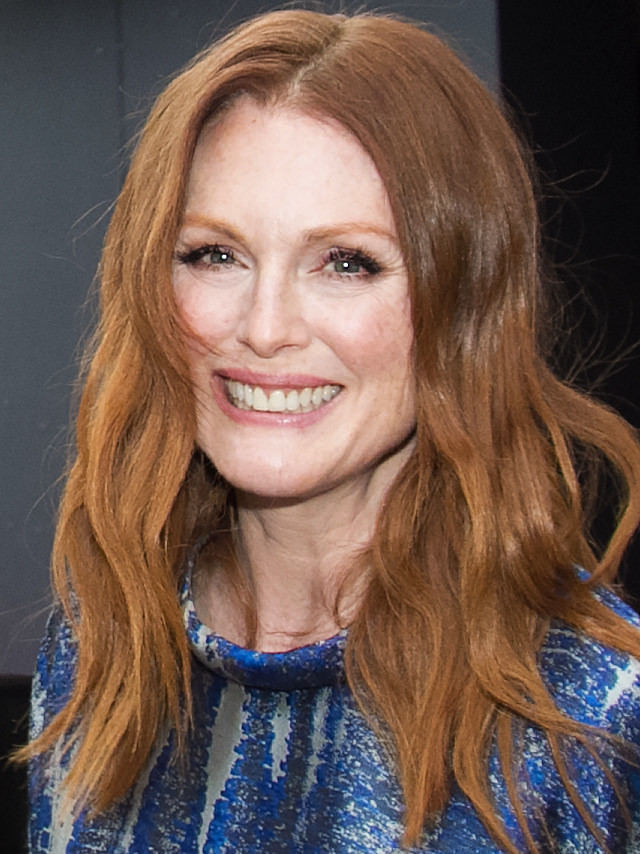
Julianne Moore won for Still Alice (2014).

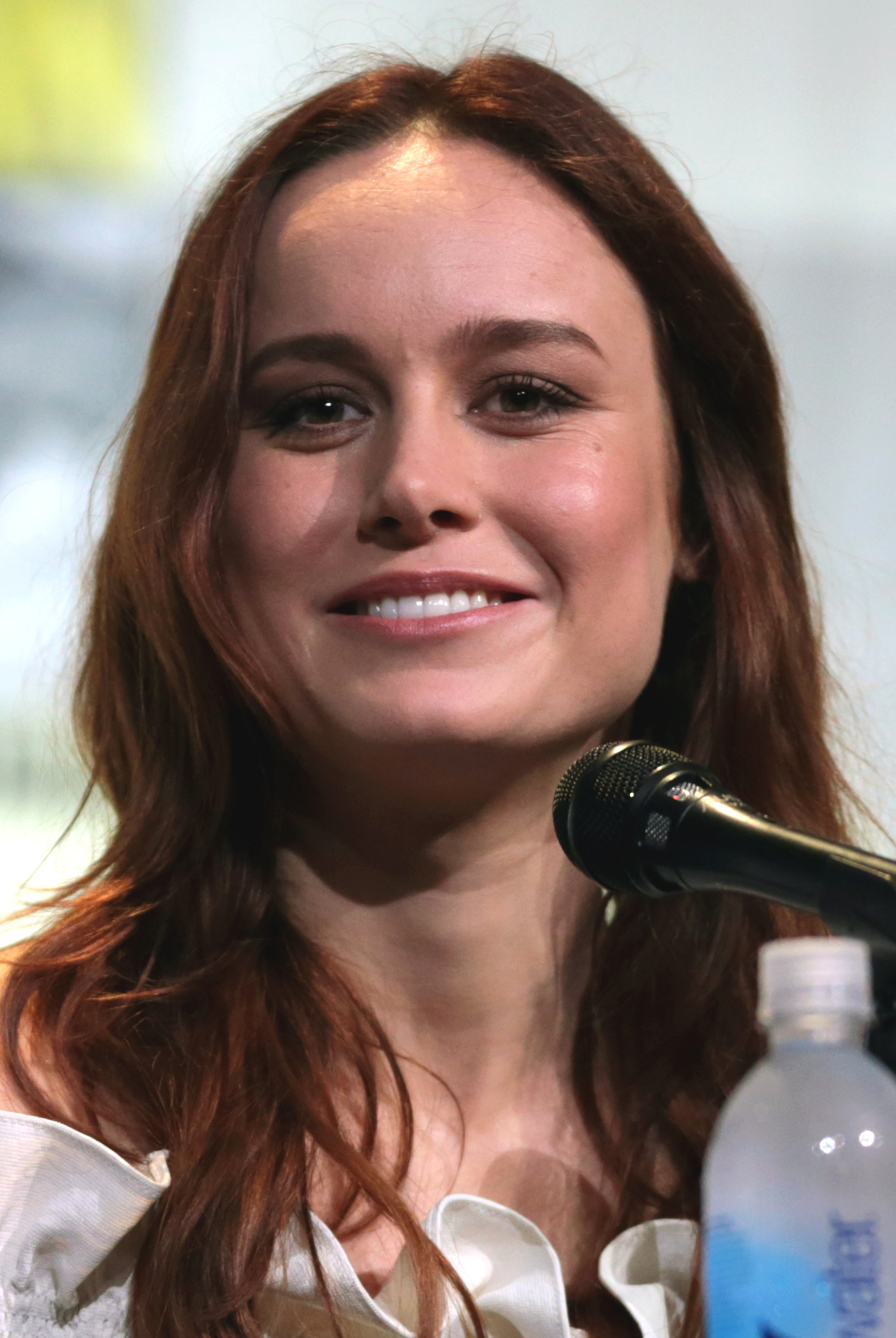
Brie Larson won for Room (2015).

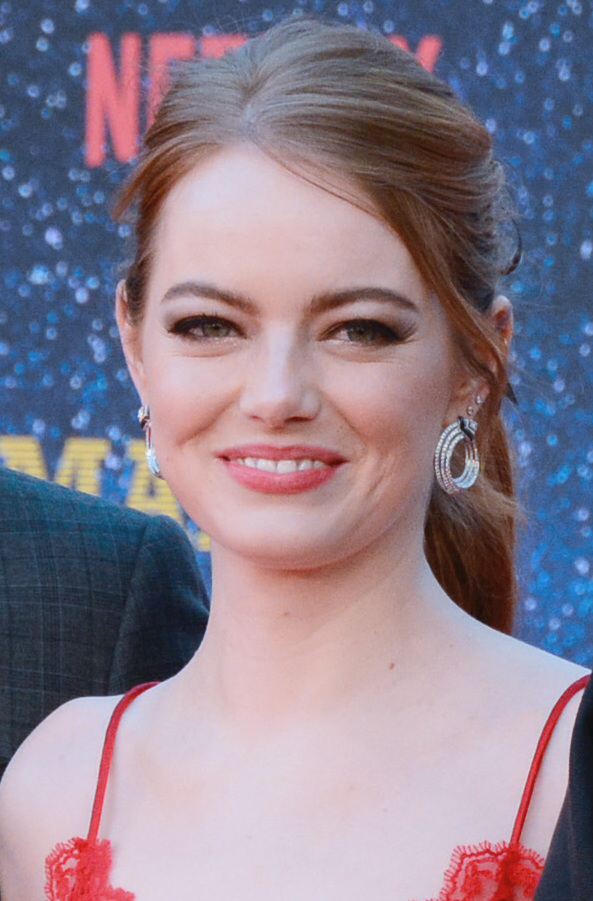
Emma Stone won twice, for La La Land (2016) and Poor Things (2023).

Frances McDormand won twice, for Three Billboards Outside Ebbing, Missouri (2017) and Nomadland (2020).

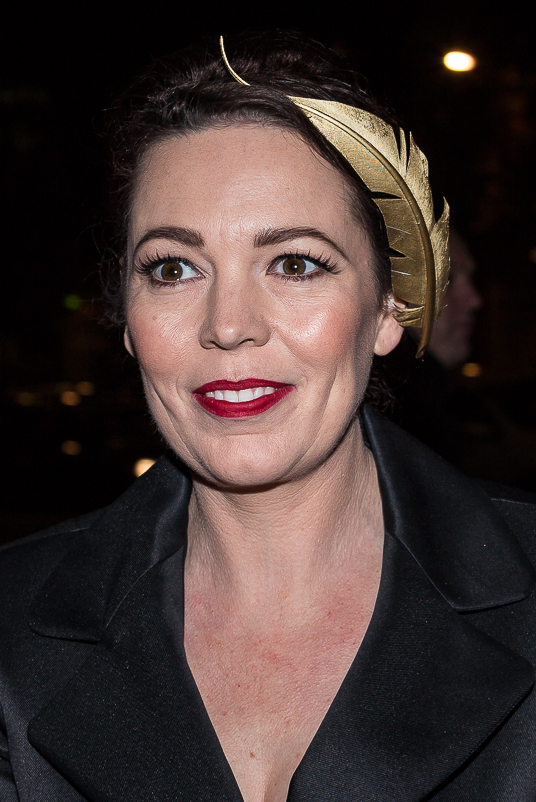
Olivia Colman won for The Favourite (2018).

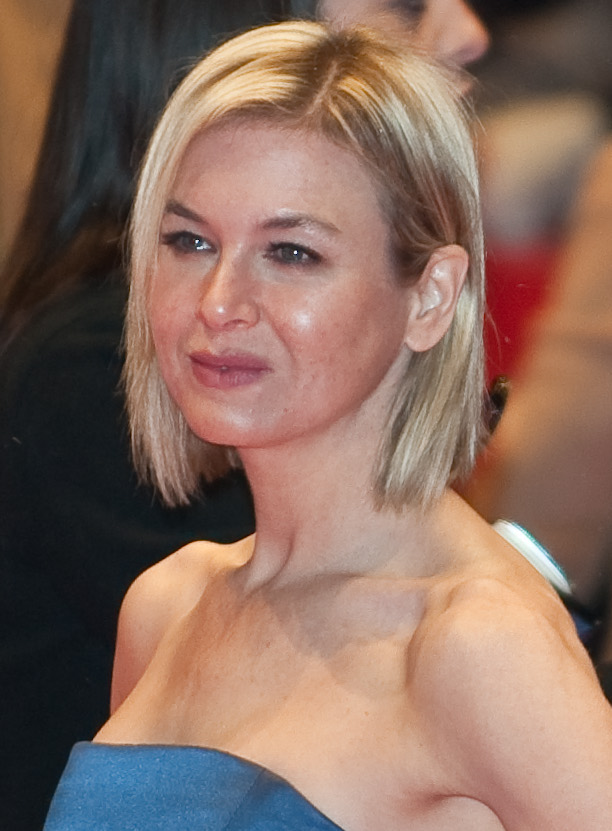
Renée Zellweger won for Judy (2019).

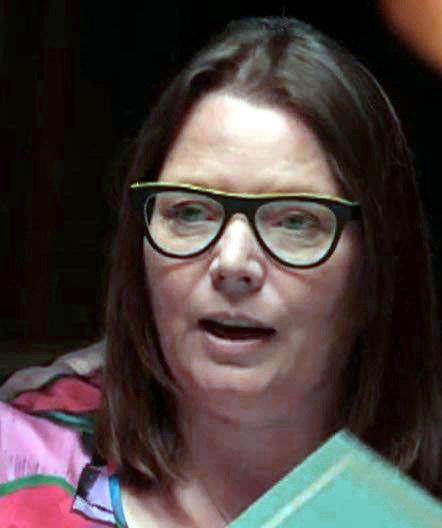
Joanna Scanlan won for After Love (2021).

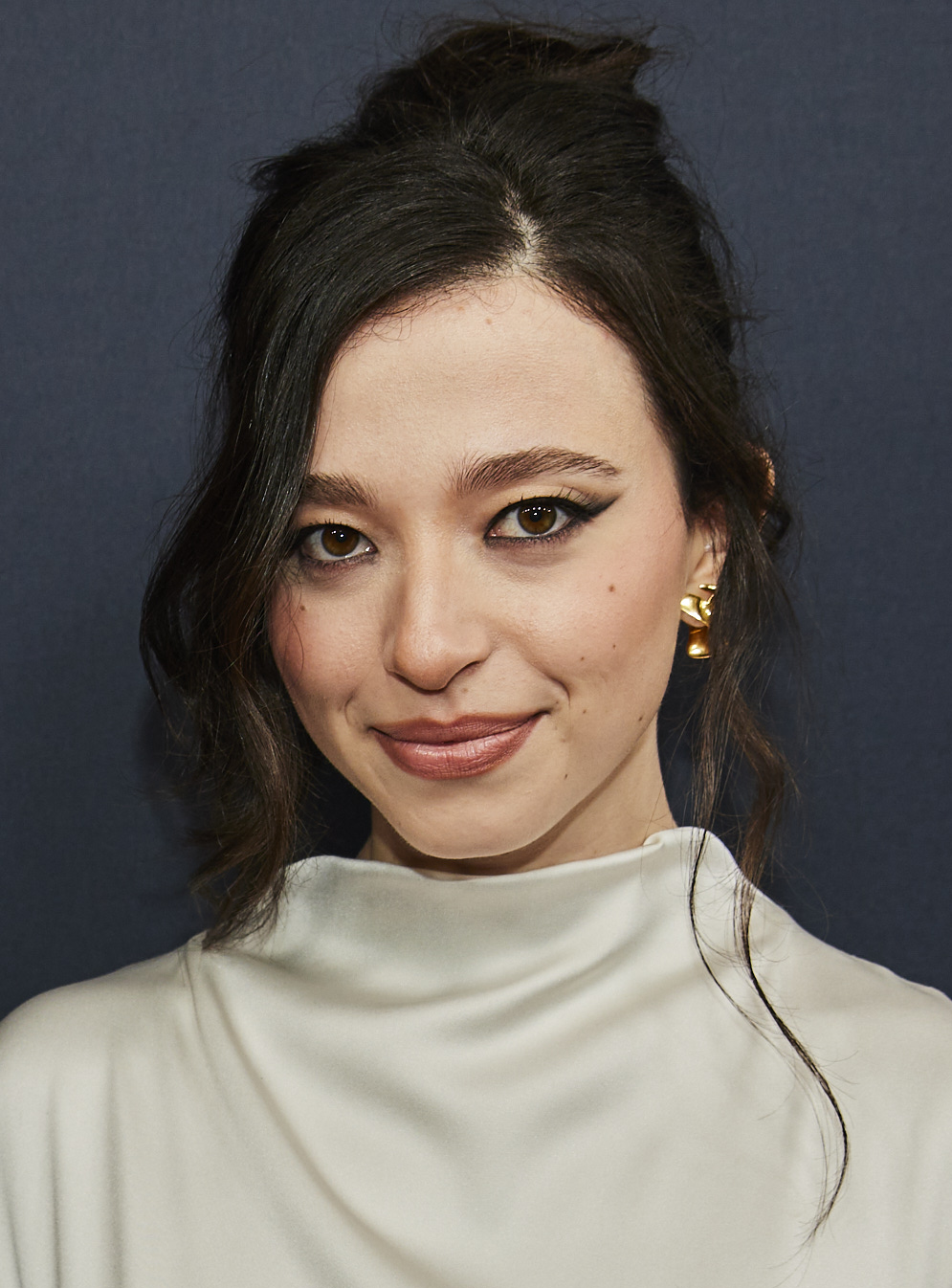
Mikey Madison won for Anora (2024)

=== 1950s ===
Year	Actor	Film	Role(s)	Ref.
**1952** (6th)	Best British Actress			
**1952** (6th)	**Vivien Leigh** †	**A Streetcar Named Desire**	**Blanche DuBois**	
**1952** (6th)	Phyllis Calvert	Mandy	Christine Garland	
**1952** (6th)	Celia Johnson	I Believe in You	Matty Matheson	
**1952** (6th)	Ann Todd	The Sound Barrier	Susan Garthwaite	
**1952** (6th)	Best Foreign Actress			
**1952** (6th)	**Simone Signoret**	**Golden Helmet**	**Marie**	
**1952** (6th)	Edwige Feuillère	Olivia	Julie	
**1952** (6th)	Katharine Hepburn	Pat and Mike	Patricia "Pat" Pemberton	
**1952** (6th)	Judy Holliday	The Marrying Kind	Florence Keefer	
**1952** (6th)	Nicole Stéphane	The Strange Ones	Elisabeth	
**1953** (7th)	Best British Actress			
**1953** (7th)	**Audrey Hepburn** †	**Roman Holiday**	**Princess Ann**	
**1953** (7th)	Celia Johnson	The Captain's Paradise	Maud	
**1953** (7th)	Best Foreign Actress			
**1953** (7th)	**Leslie Caron**	**Lili**	**Lili Daurier**	
**1953** (7th)	Shirley Booth †	Come Back, Little Sheba	Lola Delaney	
**1953** (7th)	Marie Powers	The Medium	Flora	
**1953** (7th)	Maria Schell	The Heart of the Matter	Helen Rolt	
**1954** (8th)	Best British Actress			
**1954** (8th)	**Yvonne Mitchell**	**The Divided Heart**	**Sonja**	
**1954** (8th)	Brenda de Banzie	Hobson's Choice	Maggie Hobson	
**1954** (8th)	Audrey Hepburn	Sabrina	Sabrina Fairchild	
**1954** (8th)	Margaret Leighton	Carrington V.C.	Valerie Carrington	
**1954** (8th)	Noelle Middleton	Carrington V.C.	Alison L. Graham	
**1954** (8th)	Best Foreign Actress			
**1954** (8th)	**Cornell Borchers**	**The Divided Heart**	**Inga Hartl**	
**1954** (8th)	Shirley Booth	About Mrs. Leslie	Vivien Leslie	
**1954** (8th)	Judy Holliday	Phffft	Nina Tracey	
**1954** (8th)	Grace Kelly	Dial M for Murder	Margot Wendice	
**1954** (8th)	Gina Lollobrigida	Bread, Love and Dreams	Maria de Ritis	
**1955** (9th)	Best British Actress			
**1955** (9th)	**Katie Johnson**	**The Ladykillers**	**Louisa Wilberforce**	
**1955** (9th)	Margaret Johnston	Touch and Go	Helen Fletcher	
**1955** (9th)	Deborah Kerr	The End of the Affair	Sarah Miles	
**1955** (9th)	Margaret Lockwood	Cast a Dark Shadow	Freda Jeffries	
**1955** (9th)	Best Foreign Actress			
**1955** (9th)	**Betsy Blair**	**Marty**	**Clara Snyder**	
**1955** (9th)	Dorothy Dandridge	Carmen Jones	Carmen Jones	
**1955** (9th)	Judy Garland	A Star Is Born	Esther Blodgett	
**1955** (9th)	Julie Harris	I Am a Camera	Sally Bowles	
**1955** (9th)	Katharine Hepburn	Summertime	Jane Hudson	
**1955** (9th)	Grace Kelly †	The Country Girl	Georgie Elgin	
**1955** (9th)	Giulietta Masina	The Road	Gelsomina	
**1955** (9th)	Marilyn Monroe	The Seven Year Itch	The Girl	
**1956** (10th)	Best British Actress			
**1956** (10th)	**Virginia McKenna**	**A Town Like Alice**	**Jean Paget**	
**1956** (10th)	Dorothy Alison	Reach for the Sky	Nurse Brace	
**1956** (10th)	Audrey Hepburn	War and Peace	Natasha Rostova	
**1956** (10th)	Best Foreign Actress			
**1956** (10th)	**Anna Magnani** †	**The Rose Tattoo**	**Serafina Delle Rose**	
**1956** (10th)	Carroll Baker	Baby Doll	Baby Doll Meighan	
**1956** (10th)	Eva Dahlbeck	Smiles of a Summer Night	Desiree Armfeldt	
**1956** (10th)	Ava Gardner	Bhowani Junction	Victoria Jones	
**1956** (10th)	Susan Hayward	I'll Cry Tomorrow	Lillian Roth	
**1956** (10th)	Shirley MacLaine	The Trouble with Harry	Jennifer Rogers	
**1956** (10th)	Kim Novak	Picnic	Marjorie Owens	
**1956** (10th)	Marisa Pavan	The Rose Tattoo	Rose Delle Rose	
**1956** (10th)	Maria Schell	Gervaise	Gervaise Macquart Coupeau	
**1956** (10th)	Jean Simmons	Guys and Dolls	Sister Sarah Brown	
**1957** (11th)	Best British Actress			
**1957** (11th)	**Heather Sears**	**The Story of Esther Costello**	**Esther Costello**	
**1957** (11th)	Deborah Kerr	Tea and Sympathy	Laura Reynolds	
**1957** (11th)	Sylvia Syms	Woman in a Dressing Gown	Georgie Harlow	
**1957** (11th)	Best Foreign Actress			
**1957** (11th)	**Simone Signoret**	**The Witches of Salem**	**Elizabeth Proctor**	
**1957** (11th)	Augusta Dabney	That Night!	Maggie Bowden	
**1957** (11th)	Katharine Hepburn	The Rainmaker	Lizzie Curry	
**1957** (11th)	Marilyn Monroe	The Prince and the Showgirl	Elsie Marina	
**1957** (11th)	Lilli Palmer	Is Anna Anderson Anastasia?	Anna Anderson	
**1957** (11th)	Eva Marie Saint	A Hatful of Rain	Celia Pope	
**1957** (11th)	Joanne Woodward †	The Three Faces of Eve	Eve White	
**1958** (12th)	Best British Actress			
**1958** (12th)	**Irene Worth**	**Orders to Kill**	**Léonie**	
**1958** (12th)	Hermione Baddeley	Room at the Top	Elspeth	
**1958** (12th)	Karuna Banerjee	Aparajito	Sarbajaya Roy	
**1958** (12th)	Virginia McKenna	Carve Her Name with Pride	Violette Szabo	
**1958** (12th)	Best Foreign Actress			
**1958** (12th)	**Simone Signoret** †	**Room at the Top**	**Alice Aisgill**	
**1958** (12th)	Ingrid Bergman	The Inn of the Sixth Happiness	Gladys Aylward	
**1958** (12th)	Anna Magnani	Wild Is the Wind	Gioia	
**1958** (12th)	Giulietta Masina	Nights of Cabiria	Cabiria Ceccarelli	
**1958** (12th)	Tatiana Samoilova	The Cranes Are Flying	Veronika	
**1958** (12th)	Elizabeth Taylor	Cat on a Hot Tin Roof	Maggie Pollitt	
**1958** (12th)	Joanne Woodward	No Down Payment	Leola Boone	
**1959** (13th)	Best British Actress			
**1959** (13th)	**Audrey Hepburn**	**The Nun's Story**	**Sister Luke (Gabrielle van der Mal)**	
**1959** (13th)	Peggy Ashcroft	The Nun's Story	Mother Mathilde	
**1959** (13th)	Wendy Hiller	Separate Tables	Pat Cooper	
**1959** (13th)	Yvonne Mitchell	Sapphire	Mildred	
**1959** (13th)	Sylvia Syms	No Trees in the Street	Hetty	
**1959** (13th)	Kay Walsh	The Horse's Mouth	Miss. Coker	
**1959** (13th)	Best Foreign Actress			
**1959** (13th)	**Shirley MacLaine**	**Ask Any Girl**	**Meg Wheeler**	
**1959** (13th)	Ava Gardner	On the Beach	Moira Davidson	
**1959** (13th)	Susan Hayward †	I Want to Live!	Barbara Graham	
**1959** (13th)	Ellie Lambeti	A Matter of Dignity	Chloe Pella	
**1959** (13th)	Rosalind Russell	Auntie Mame	Mame Dennis	

=== 1960s ===
Year	Actor	Film	Role(s)	Ref.
**1960** (14th)	Best British Actress			
**1960** (14th)	**Rachel Roberts**	**Saturday Night and Sunday Morning**	**Brenda**	
**1960** (14th)	Wendy Hiller	Sons and Lovers	Gertrude Morel	
**1960** (14th)	Hayley Mills	Pollyanna	Pollyanna	
**1960** (14th)	Best Foreign Actress			
**1960** (14th)	**Shirley MacLaine**	**The Apartment**	**Fran Kubelik**	
**1960** (14th)	Pier Angeli	The Angry Silence	Anna Curtis	
**1960** (14th)	Melina Mercouri	Never on Sunday	Illya	
**1960** (14th)	Emmanuelle Riva	Hiroshima, My Love	Elle	
**1960** (14th)	Jean Simmons	Elmer Gantry	Sharon Falconer	
**1960** (14th)	Monica Vitti	The Adventure	Claudia	
**1961** (15th)	Best British Actress			
**1961** (15th)	**Dora Bryan**	**A Taste of Honey**	**Helen**	
**1961** (15th)	Deborah Kerr	The Sundowners	Ida Carmody	
**1961** (15th)	Hayley Mills	Whistle Down the Wind	Kathy Bostock	
**1961** (15th)	Best Foreign Actress			
**1961** (15th)	**Sophia Loren** †	**Two Women**	**Cesira**	
**1961** (15th)	Annie Girardot	Rocco and His Brothers	Nadia	
**1961** (15th)	Piper Laurie	The Hustler	Sarah Packard	
**1961** (15th)	Claudia McNeil	A Raisin in the Sun	Lena Younger	
**1961** (15th)	Jean Seberg	Breathless	Patricia Franchini	
**1962** (16th)	Best British Actress			
**1962** (16th)	**Leslie Caron**	**The L-Shaped Room**	**Jane Fosset**	
**1962** (16th)	Virginia Maskell	The Wild and the Willing	Virginia Chown	
**1962** (16th)	Janet Munro	Life for Ruth	Pat Harris	
**1962** (16th)	Best Foreign Actress			
**1962** (16th)	**Anne Bancroft** †	**The Miracle Worker**	**Annie Sullivan**	
**1962** (16th)	Anouk Aimée	Lola	Lola	
**1962** (16th)	Harriet Andersson	Through a Glass Darkly	Karin	
**1962** (16th)	Melina Mercouri	Phaedra	Phaedra	
**1962** (16th)	Jeanne Moreau	Jules and Jim	Catherine	
**1962** (16th)	Geraldine Page	Sweet Bird of Youth	Alexandra del Lago	
**1962** (16th)	Natalie Wood	Splendor in the Grass	Deanie Loomis	
**1963** (17th)	Best British Actress			
**1963** (17th)	**Rachel Roberts**	**This Sporting Life**	**Margaret Hammond**	
**1963** (17th)	Julie Christie	Billy Liar	Liz	
**1963** (17th)	Edith Evans	Tom Jones	Miss Western	
**1963** (17th)	Sarah Miles	The Servant	Vera	
**1963** (17th)	Barbara Windsor	Sparrows Can't Sing	Maggie Gooding	
**1963** (17th)	Best Foreign Actress			
**1963** (17th)	**Patricia Neal** †	**Hud**	**Alma Brown**	
**1963** (17th)	Joan Crawford	What Ever Happened to Baby Jane?	Blanche Hudson	
**1963** (17th)	Bette Davis	What Ever Happened to Baby Jane?	Baby Jane Hudson	
**1963** (17th)	Lee Remick	Days of Wine and Roses	Kirsten Arnesen Clay	
**1963** (17th)	Daniela Rocca	Divorce Italian Style	Rosalia Cefalù	
**1964** (18th)	Best British Actress			
**1964** (18th)	**Audrey Hepburn**	**Charade**	**Regina Lampert**	
**1964** (18th)	Edith Evans	The Chalk Garden	Mrs. St. Maugham	
**1964** (18th)	Deborah Kerr	The Chalk Garden	Mrs. Madrigal	
**1964** (18th)	Rita Tushingham	Girl with Green Eyes	Kate Brady	
**1964** (18th)	Best Foreign Actress			
**1964** (18th)	**Anne Bancroft**	**The Pumpkin Eater**	**Jo Armitage**	
**1964** (18th)	Ava Gardner	The Night of the Iguana	Maxine Faulk	
**1964** (18th)	Shirley MacLaine ^{[A]}	Irma la Douce	Irma la Douce	
**1964** (18th)	Shirley MacLaine ^{[A]}	What a Way to Go!	Louisa Foster	
**1964** (18th)	Kim Stanley	Séance on a Wet Afternoon	Myra Savage	
**1965** (19th)	Best British Actress			
**1965** (19th)	**Julie Christie** †	**Darling**	**Diana Scott**	
**1965** (19th)	Julie Andrews ^{[A]}	The Americanization of Emily	Emily Barham	
**1965** (19th)	Julie Andrews ^{[A]}	The Sound of Music	Maria von Trapp	
**1965** (19th)	Maggie Smith	Young Cassidy	Nora	
**1965** (19th)	Rita Tushingham	The Knack ...and How to Get It	Nancy Jones	
**1965** (19th)	Best Foreign Actress			
**1965** (19th)	**Patricia Neal**	**In Harm's Way**	**Maggie Haines**	
**1965** (19th)	Jane Fonda	Cat Ballou	Catherine Ballou	
**1965** (19th)	Lila Kedrova	Zorba the Greek	Madame Hortense	
**1965** (19th)	Simone Signoret	Ship of Fools	La Condesa	
**1966** (20th)	Best British Actress			
**1966** (20th)	**Elizabeth Taylor** †	**Who's Afraid of Virginia Woolf?**	**Martha**	
**1966** (20th)	Julie Christie ^{[A]}	Doctor Zhivago	Lara Antipova	
**1966** (20th)	Julie Christie ^{[A]}	Fahrenheit 451	Linda Montag / Clarisse	
**1966** (20th)	Lynn Redgrave	Georgy Girl	Georgina "Georgy" Parkin	
**1966** (20th)	Vanessa Redgrave	Morgan – A Suitable Case for Treatment	Leonie Delt	
**1966** (20th)	Best Foreign Actress			
**1966** (20th)	**Jeanne Moreau**	**Viva Maria!**	**Maria I**	
**1966** (20th)	Brigitte Bardot	Viva Maria!	Maria II	
**1966** (20th)	Joan Hackett	The Group	Dottie Renfrew	
**1966** (20th)	Simone Signoret	The Sleeping Car Murders	Éliane Darrès	
**1967** (21st)	Best British Actress			
**1967** (21st)	**Edith Evans**	**The Whisperers**	**Mrs. Ross**	
**1967** (21st)	Barbara Jefford	Ulysses	Molly Bloom	
**1967** (21st)	Elizabeth Taylor	The Taming of the Shrew	Katharina	
**1967** (21st)	Best Foreign Actress			
**1967** (21st)	**Anouk Aimée**	**A Man and a Woman**	**Anne Gauthier**	
**1967** (21st)	Bibi Andersson ^{[A]}	My Sister, My Love	Charlotte	
**1967** (21st)	Bibi Andersson ^{[A]}	Persona	Alma	
**1967** (21st)	Jane Fonda	Barefoot in the Park	Corie Bratter	
**1967** (21st)	Simone Signoret	The Deadly Affair	Elsa Fennan	
**1968** (22nd)	Best Actress			
**1968** (22nd)	**Katharine Hepburn ^{[A]}** ††	**Guess Who's Coming to Dinner**	**Christina Drayton**	
**1968** (22nd)	**Katharine Hepburn ^{[A]}** ††	**The Lion in Winter**	**Eleanor of Aquitaine**	
**1968** (22nd)	Anne Bancroft	The Graduate	Mrs. Robinson	
**1968** (22nd)	Catherine Deneuve	Beauty of the Day	Séverine Serizy	
**1968** (22nd)	Joanne Woodward	Rachel, Rachel	Rachel Cameron	
**1969** (23rd)	**Maggie Smith** †	**The Prime of Miss Jean Brodie**	**Jean Brodie**	
**1969** (23rd)	Mia Farrow ^{[A]}	John and Mary	Mary	
**1969** (23rd)	Mia Farrow ^{[A]}	Rosemary's Baby	Rosemary Woodhouse	
**1969** (23rd)	Mia Farrow ^{[A]}	Secret Ceremony	Cenci	
**1969** (23rd)	Glenda Jackson †	Women in Love	Gudrun Brangwen	
**1969** (23rd)	Barbra Streisand † ^{[A]}	Funny Girl	Fanny Brice	
**1969** (23rd)	Barbra Streisand † ^{[A]}	Hello Dolly!	Dolly Gallagher Levi	

=== 1970s ===
Year	Actor	Film	Role(s)	Ref.
**1970** (24th)	**Katharine Ross ^{[A]}**	**Butch Cassidy and the Sundance Kid**	**Etta Place**	
**1970** (24th)	**Katharine Ross ^{[A]}**	**Tell Them Willie Boy Is Here**	**Lola**	
**1970** (24th)	Jane Fonda	They Shoot Horses, Don't They?	Gloria Beatty	
**1970** (24th)	Goldie Hawn ^{[A]}	Cactus Flower	Toni Simmons	
**1970** (24th)	Goldie Hawn ^{[A]}	There's a Girl in My Soup	Marion	
**1970** (24th)	Sarah Miles	Ryan's Daughter	Rosy Ryan	
**1971** (25th)	**Glenda Jackson**	**Sunday Bloody Sunday**	**Alex Greville**	
**1971** (25th)	Lynn Carlin	Taking Off	Lynn Tyne	
**1971** (25th)	Julie Christie	The Go-Between	Marian	
**1971** (25th)	Jane Fonda †	Klute	Bree Daniels	
**1971** (25th)	Nanette Newman	The Raging Moon	Jill Matthews	
**1972** (26th)	**Liza Minnelli** †	**Cabaret**	**Sally Bowles**	
**1972** (26th)	Stéphane Audran	The Butcher	Hélène	
**1972** (26th)	Anne Bancroft	Young Winston	Lady Randolph Churchill	
**1972** (26th)	Dorothy Tutin	Savage Messiah	Sophie Brzeska	
**1973** (27th)	**Stéphane Audran ^{[A]}**	**The Discreet Charm of the Bourgeoisie**	**Alice Sénéchal**	
**1973** (27th)	**Stéphane Audran ^{[A]}**	**Just Before Nightfall**	**Hélène Masson**	
**1973** (27th)	Julie Christie	Don't Look Now	Laura Baxter	
**1973** (27th)	Glenda Jackson †	A Touch of Class	Vicki Allessio	
**1973** (27th)	Diana Ross	Lady Sings the Blues	Billie Holiday	
**1974** (28th)	**Joanne Woodward**	**Summer Wishes, Winter Dreams**	**Rita Walden**	
**1974** (28th)	Faye Dunaway	Chinatown	Evelyn Mulwray	
**1974** (28th)	Barbra Streisand	The Way We Were	Katie Morosky	
**1974** (28th)	Cicely Tyson	The Autobiography of Miss Jane Pittman	Jane Pittmann	
**1975** (29th)	**Ellen Burstyn** †	**Alice Doesn't Live Here Anymore**	**Alice Hyatt**	
**1975** (29th)	Anne Bancroft	The Prisoner of Second Avenue	Edna Edison	
**1975** (29th)	Valerie Perrine	Lenny	Honey Harlow	
**1975** (29th)	Liv Ullmann	Scenes from a Marriage	Marianne	
**1976** (30th)	**Louise Fletcher** †	**One Flew Over the Cuckoo's Nest**	**Nurse Ratched**	
**1976** (30th)	Lauren Bacall	The Shootist	Bond Rogers	
**1976** (30th)	Rita Moreno	The Ritz	Googie Gomez	
**1976** (30th)	Liv Ullmann	Face to Face	Jenny Isaksson	
**1977** (31st)	**Diane Keaton** †	**Annie Hall**	**Annie Hall**	
**1977** (31st)	Faye Dunaway †	Network	Diana Christensen	
**1977** (31st)	Shelley Duvall	3 Women	Millie Lammoreaux	
**1977** (31st)	Lily Tomlin	The Late Show	Margo Sperling	
**1978** (32nd)	**Jane Fonda**	**Julia**	**Lillian Hellman**	
**1978** (32nd)	Anne Bancroft	The Turning Point	Emma Jacklin	
**1978** (32nd)	Jill Clayburgh	An Unmarried Woman	Erica Benton	
**1978** (32nd)	Marsha Mason	The Goodbye Girl	Paula McFadden	
**1979** (33rd)	**Jane Fonda**	**The China Syndrome**	**Kimberly Wells**	
**1979** (33rd)	Diane Keaton	Manhattan	Mary Wilkie	
**1979** (33rd)	Maggie Smith	California Suite	Diana Barrie	
**1979** (33rd)	Meryl Streep	The Deer Hunter	Linda	

=== 1980s ===
Year	Actor	Film	Role(s)	Ref.
**1980** (34th)	**Judy Davis**	**My Brilliant Career**	**Sybylla Melvyn**	
**1980** (34th)	Shirley MacLaine	Being There	Eve Rand	
**1980** (34th)	Bette Midler	The Rose	Mary Rose Foster	
**1980** (34th)	Meryl Streep	Kramer vs. Kramer	Joanna Kramer	
**1981** (35th)	**Meryl Streep**	**The French Lieutenant's Woman**	**Sara Woodruff and Anna**	
**1981** (35th)	Mary Tyler Moore	Ordinary People	Beth Jarrett	
**1981** (35th)	Maggie Smith	Quartet	Lois Heidler	
**1981** (35th)	Sissy Spacek †	Coal Miner's Daughter	Loretta Lynn	
**1982** (36th)	**Katharine Hepburn** †	**On Golden Pond**	**Ethel Thayer**	
**1982** (36th)	Diane Keaton	Reds	Louise Bryant	
**1982** (36th)	Jennifer Kendal	36 Chowringhee Lane	Violet Stoneham	
**1982** (36th)	Sissy Spacek	Missing	Beth Horman	
**1983** (37th)	**Julie Walters**	**Educating Rita**	**Susan "Rita" White**	
**1983** (37th)	Jessica Lange	Tootsie	Julie Nichols	
**1983** (37th)	Phyllis Logan	Another Time, Another Place	Janie	
**1983** (37th)	Meryl Streep †	Sophie's Choice	Zofia "Sophie" Zawistowski	
**1984** (38th)	**Maggie Smith**	**A Private Function**	**Joyce Chilvers**	
**1984** (38th)	Shirley MacLaine †	Terms of Endearment	Aurora Greenway	
**1984** (38th)	Helen Mirren	Cal	Marcella	
**1984** (38th)	Meryl Streep	Silkwood	Karen Silkwood	
**1985** (39th)	**Peggy Ashcroft**	**A Passage to India**	**Mrs. Moore**	
**1985** (39th)	Mia Farrow	The Purple Rose of Cairo	Cecilia	
**1985** (39th)	Kelly McGillis	Witness	Rachel Lapp	
**1985** (39th)	Alexandra Pigg	Letter to Brezhnev	Elaine	
**1986** (40th)	**Maggie Smith**	**A Room with a View**	**Charlotte Bartlett**	
**1986** (40th)	Mia Farrow	Hannah and Her Sisters	Hannah	
**1986** (40th)	Meryl Streep	Out of Africa	Karen Blixen	
**1986** (40th)	Cathy Tyson	Mona Lisa	Simone	
**1987** (41st)	**Anne Bancroft**	**84 Charing Cross Road**	**Helene Hanff**	
**1987** (41st)	Emily Lloyd	Wish You Were Here	Lynda Mansell	
**1987** (41st)	Sarah Miles	Hope and Glory	Grace Rowan	
**1987** (41st)	Julie Walters	Personal Services	Christine Painter	
**1988** (42nd)	**Maggie Smith**	**The Lonely Passion of Judith Hearne**	**Judith Hearne**	
**1988** (42nd)	Stéphane Audran	Babette's Feast	Babette Hersant	
**1988** (42nd)	Cher †	Moonstruck	Loretta Castorini	
**1988** (42nd)	Jamie Lee Curtis	A Fish Called Wanda	Wanda Gershwitz	
**1989** (43rd)	**Pauline Collins**	**Shirley Valentine**	**Shirley Valentine**	
**1989** (43rd)	Glenn Close	Dangerous Liaisons	Marquise de Merteuil	
**1989** (43rd)	Jodie Foster †	The Accused	Sarah Tobias	
**1989** (43rd)	Melanie Griffith	Working Girl	Tess McGill	

=== 1990s ===
Year	Actor	Film	Role(s)	Ref.
**1990** (44th)	**Jessica Tandy** †	**Driving Miss Daisy**	**Daisy Werthan**	
**1990** (44th)	Shirley MacLaine	Postcards from the Edge	Doris Mann	
**1990** (44th)	Michelle Pfeiffer	The Fabulous Baker Boys	Susie Diamond	
**1990** (44th)	Julia Roberts	Pretty Woman	Vivian Ward	
**1991** (45th)	**Jodie Foster** †	**The Silence of the Lambs**	**Clarice Starling**	
**1991** (45th)	Geena Davis	Thelma & Louise	Thelma Dickinson	
**1991** (45th)	Susan Sarandon	Thelma & Louise	Louise Sawyer	
**1991** (45th)	Juliet Stevenson	Truly, Madly, Deeply	Nina	
**1992** (46th)	**Emma Thompson** †	**Howards End**	**Margaret Schlegel**	
**1992** (46th)	Judy Davis	Husbands and Wives	Sally Simmons	
**1992** (46th)	Tara Morice	Strictly Ballroom	Fran	
**1992** (46th)	Jessica Tandy	Fried Green Tomatoes	Ninny Threadgoode	
**1993** (47th)	**Holly Hunter** †	**The Piano**	**Ada McGrath**	
**1993** (47th)	Miranda Richardson	Tom & Viv	Vivienne Haigh-Wood Eliot	
**1993** (47th)	Emma Thompson	The Remains of the Day	Sarah Kenton	
**1993** (47th)	Debra Winger	Shadowlands	Joy Davidman Gresham	
**1994** (48th)	**Susan Sarandon**	**The Client**	**Regina "Reggie" Love**	
**1994** (48th)	Linda Fiorentino	The Last Seduction	Bridget Gregory	
**1994** (48th)	Irène Jacob	Three Colours: Red	Valentine Dussaut	
**1994** (48th)	Uma Thurman	Pulp Fiction	Mia Wallace	
**1995** (49th)	**Emma Thompson**	**Sense and Sensibility**	**Elinor Dashwood**	
**1995** (49th)	Nicole Kidman	To Die For	Suzanne Stone-Maretto	
**1995** (49th)	Helen Mirren	The Madness of King George	Queen Charlotte	
**1995** (49th)	Elisabeth Shue	Leaving Las Vegas	Sera	
**1996** (50th)	**Brenda Blethyn**	**Secrets & Lies**	**Cynthia Purley**	
**1996** (50th)	Frances McDormand †	Fargo	Marge Gunderson	
**1996** (50th)	Kristin Scott Thomas	The English Patient	Katharine Clifton	
**1996** (50th)	Emily Watson	Breaking the Waves	Bess McNeill	
**1997** (51st)	**Judi Dench**	**Mrs Brown**	**Queen Victoria**	
**1997** (51st)	Kim Basinger	L.A. Confidential	Lynn Bracken	
**1997** (51st)	Helena Bonham Carter	The Wings of the Dove	Kate Croy	
**1997** (51st)	Kathy Burke	Nil by Mouth	Valerie	
**1998** (52nd)	**Cate Blanchett**	**Elizabeth**	**Queen Elizabeth I**	
**1998** (52nd)	Jane Horrocks	Little Voice	Laurie Hoff / Little Voice "LV"	
**1998** (52nd)	Gwyneth Paltrow †	Shakespeare in Love	Viola de Lesseps	
**1998** (52nd)	Emily Watson	Hilary and Jackie	Jacqueline du Pré	
**1999** (53rd)	**Annette Bening**	**American Beauty**	**Carolyn Burnham**	
**1999** (53rd)	Linda Bassett	East Is East	Ella Khan	
**1999** (53rd)	Julianne Moore	The End of the Affair	Sarah Miles	
**1999** (53rd)	Emily Watson	Angela's Ashes	Angela Sheehan McCourt	

=== 2000s ===
Year	Actor	Film	Role(s)	Ref.
**2000** (54th)	**Julia Roberts** †	**Erin Brockovich**	**Erin Brockovich**	
**2000** (54th)	Juliette Binoche	Chocolat	Vivianne Rocher	
**2000** (54th)	Kate Hudson	Almost Famous	Penny Lane	
**2000** (54th)	Hilary Swank †	Boys Don't Cry	Brandon Teena	
**2000** (54th)	Michelle Yeoh	Crouching Tiger, Hidden Dragon	Yu Shu Lien	
**2001** (55th)	**Judi Dench**	**Iris**	**Iris Murdoch**	
**2001** (55th)	Nicole Kidman	The Others	Grace Stewart	
**2001** (55th)	Sissy Spacek	In the Bedroom	Ruth Fowler	
**2001** (55th)	Audrey Tautou	Amélie	Amélie Poulain	
**2001** (55th)	Renée Zellweger	Bridget Jones's Diary	Bridget Jones	
**2002** (56th)	**Nicole Kidman** †	**The Hours**	**Virginia Woolf**	
**2002** (56th)	Halle Berry †	Monster's Ball	Leticia Musgrove	
**2002** (56th)	Salma Hayek	Frida	Frida Kahlo	
**2002** (56th)	Meryl Streep	The Hours	Clarissa Vaughan	
**2002** (56th)	Renée Zellweger	Chicago	Roxie Hart	
**2003** (57th)	**Scarlett Johansson**	**Lost in Translation**	**Charlotte**	
**2003** (57th)	Scarlett Johansson	Girl with a Pearl Earring	Griet	
**2003** (57th)	Anne Reid	The Mother	May	
**2003** (57th)	Uma Thurman	Kill Bill: Volume 1	Beatrix Kiddo	
**2003** (57th)	Naomi Watts	21 Grams	Cristina Peck	
**2004** (58th)	**Imelda Staunton**	**Vera Drake**	**Vera Drake**	
**2004** (58th)	Charlize Theron †	Monster	Aileen Wuornos	
**2004** (58th)	Kate Winslet	Eternal Sunshine of the Spotless Mind	Clementine Kruczynski	
**2004** (58th)	Kate Winslet	Finding Neverland	Sylvia Llewelyn Davies	
**2004** (58th)	Zhang Ziyi	House of Flying Daggers	Mei	
**2005** (59th)	**Reese Witherspoon** †	**Walk the Line**	**June Carter Cash**	
**2005** (59th)	Judi Dench	Mrs Henderson Presents	Laura Henderson	
**2005** (59th)	Charlize Theron	North Country	Josey Aimes	
**2005** (59th)	Rachel Weisz	The Constant Gardener	Tessa Abbott-Quayle	
**2005** (59th)	Zhang Ziyi	Memoirs of a Geisha	Chiyo Sakamoto / Sayuri Nitta	
**2006** (60th)	**Helen Mirren** †	**The Queen**	**Queen Elizabeth II**	
**2006** (60th)	Penélope Cruz	Volver	Raimunda	
**2006** (60th)	Judi Dench	Notes on a Scandal	Barbara Covett	
**2006** (60th)	Meryl Streep	The Devil Wears Prada	Miranda Priestly	
**2006** (60th)	Kate Winslet	Little Children	Sarah Pierce	
**2007** (61st)	**Marion Cotillard** †	**La Vie en Rose**	**Édith Piaf**	
**2007** (61st)	Cate Blanchett	Elizabeth: The Golden Age	Queen Elizabeth I	
**2007** (61st)	Julie Christie	Away from Her	Fiona Anderson	
**2007** (61st)	Keira Knightley	Atonement	Cecilia Tallis	
**2007** (61st)	Elliot Page ^{[B]}	Juno	Juno MacGuff	
**2008** (62nd)	**Kate Winslet** †	**The Reader**	**Hanna Schmitz**	
**2008** (62nd)	Angelina Jolie	Changeling	Christine Collins	
**2008** (62nd)	Kristin Scott Thomas	I've Loved You So Long	Juliette Fontaine	
**2008** (62nd)	Meryl Streep	Doubt	Sister Aloysius Beauvier	
**2008** (62nd)	Kate Winslet	Revolutionary Road	April Wheeler	
**2009** (63rd)	**Carey Mulligan**	**An Education**	**Jenny Mellor**	
**2009** (63rd)	Saoirse Ronan	The Lovely Bones	Susie Salmon	
**2009** (63rd)	Gabourey Sidibe	Precious	Claireece "Precious" Jones	
**2009** (63rd)	Meryl Streep	Julie & Julia	Julia Child	
**2009** (63rd)	Audrey Tautou	Coco Before Chanel	Coco Chanel	

=== 2010s ===
Year	Actor	Film	Role(s)	Ref.
**2010** (64th)	**Natalie Portman** †	**Black Swan**	**Nina Sayers**	
**2010** (64th)	Annette Bening	The Kids Are All Right	Dr. Nicole "Nic" Allgood	
**2010** (64th)	Julianne Moore	The Kids Are All Right	Jules Allgood	
**2010** (64th)	Noomi Rapace	The Girl with the Dragon Tattoo	Lisbeth Salander	
**2010** (64th)	Hailee Steinfeld	True Grit	Mattie Ross	
**2011** (65th)	**Meryl Streep** †	**The Iron Lady**	**Margaret Thatcher**	
**2011** (65th)	Bérénice Bejo	The Artist	Peppy Miller	
**2011** (65th)	Viola Davis	The Help	Aibleen Clark	
**2011** (65th)	Tilda Swinton	We Need to Talk About Kevin	Eva Khatchadourian	
**2011** (65th)	Michelle Williams	My Week with Marilyn	Marilyn Monroe	
**2012** (66th)	**Emmanuelle Riva ^{[C]}**	**Amour**	**Anne Laurent**	
**2012** (66th)	Jessica Chastain	Zero Dark Thirty	Maya Harris	
**2012** (66th)	Marion Cotillard ^{[C]}	Rust and Bone	Stéphanie	
**2012** (66th)	Jennifer Lawrence †	Silver Linings Playbook	Tiffany Maxwell	
**2012** (66th)	Helen Mirren	Hitchcock	Alma Reville Hitchcock	
**2013** (67th)	**Cate Blanchett** †	**Blue Jasmine**	**Jeanette "Jasmine" Francis**	
**2013** (67th)	Amy Adams	American Hustle	Sydney Prosser / Lady Edith Greensly	
**2013** (67th)	Sandra Bullock	Gravity	Dr. Ryan Stone	
**2013** (67th)	Judi Dench	Philomena	Philomena Lee	
**2013** (67th)	Emma Thompson	Saving Mr. Banks	P. L. Travers	
**2014** (68th)	**Julianne Moore** †	**Still Alice**	**Dr. Alice Howland**	
**2014** (68th)	Amy Adams	Big Eyes	Margaret Keane	
**2014** (68th)	Felicity Jones	The Theory of Everything	Jane Wilde Hawking	
**2014** (68th)	Rosamund Pike	Gone Girl	Amy Elliott-Dunne	
**2014** (68th)	Reese Witherspoon	Wild	Cheryl Strayed	
**2015** (69th)	**Brie Larson** †	**Room**	**Joy "Ma" Newsome**	
**2015** (69th)	Cate Blanchett	Carol	Carol Aird	
**2015** (69th)	Saoirse Ronan	Brooklyn	Eilis Lacey	
**2015** (69th)	Maggie Smith	The Lady in the Van	Mary Shepherd / Margaret Fairchild	
**2015** (69th)	Alicia Vikander	The Danish Girl	Gerda Wegener	
**2016** (70th)	**Emma Stone** †	**La La Land**	**Mia Dolan**	
**2016** (70th)	Amy Adams	Arrival	Dr. Louise Banks	
**2016** (70th)	Emily Blunt	The Girl on the Train	Rachel Watson	
**2016** (70th)	Natalie Portman	Jackie	Jackie Kennedy	
**2016** (70th)	Meryl Streep	Florence Foster Jenkins	Florence Foster Jenkins	
**2017** (71st)	**Frances McDormand** †	**Three Billboards Outside Ebbing, Missouri**	**Mildred Hayes**	
**2017** (71st)	Annette Bening	Film Stars Don't Die in Liverpool	Gloria Grahame	
**2017** (71st)	Sally Hawkins	The Shape of Water	Elisa Esposito	
**2017** (71st)	Margot Robbie	I, Tonya	Tonya Harding	
**2017** (71st)	Saoirse Ronan	Lady Bird	Christine "Lady Bird" McPherson	
**2018** (72nd)	**Olivia Colman** †	**The Favourite**	**Queen Anne**	
**2018** (72nd)	Glenn Close	The Wife	Joan Castleman	
**2018** (72nd)	Viola Davis	Widows	Veronica Rawlings	
**2018** (72nd)	Lady Gaga	A Star Is Born	Ally Maine	
**2018** (72nd)	Melissa McCarthy	Can You Ever Forgive Me?	Lee Israel	
**2019** (73rd)	**Renée Zellweger** †	**Judy**	**Judy Garland**	
**2019** (73rd)	Jessie Buckley	Wild Rose	Rose-Lynn Harlan	
**2019** (73rd)	Scarlett Johansson	Marriage Story	Nicole Barber	
**2019** (73rd)	Saoirse Ronan	Little Women	Josephine "Jo" March	
**2019** (73rd)	Charlize Theron	Bombshell	Megyn Kelly	

=== 2020s ===
Year	Actor	Film	Role(s)	Ref.
**2020** (74th)	**Frances McDormand** †	**Nomadland**	**Fern**	
**2020** (74th)	Bukky Bakray	Rocks	Olushola "Rocks" Omotoso	
**2020** (74th)	Radha Blank	The Forty-Year-Old Version	Radha Blank	
**2020** (74th)	Vanessa Kirby	Pieces of a Woman	Martha Weiss	
**2020** (74th)	Wunmi Mosaku	His House	Rial Majur	
**2020** (74th)	Alfre Woodard	Clemency	Bernardine Williams	
**2021** (75th)	**Joanna Scanlan**	**After Love**	**Mary Hussain**	
**2021** (75th)	Lady Gaga	House of Gucci	Patrizia Reggiani	
**2021** (75th)	Alana Haim	Licorice Pizza	Alana Kane	
**2021** (75th)	Emilia Jones	CODA	Ruby Rossi	
**2021** (75th)	Renate Reinsve	The Worst Person in the World	Julie	
**2021** (75th)	Tessa Thompson	Passing	Irene Redfield	
**2022** (76th)	**Cate Blanchett**	**Tár**	**Lydia Tár**	
**2022** (76th)	Viola Davis	The Woman King	General Nanisca	
**2022** (76th)	Ana de Armas	Blonde	Marilyn Monroe	
**2022** (76th)	Danielle Deadwyler	Till	Mamie Till	
**2022** (76th)	Emma Thompson	Good Luck to You, Leo Grande	Nancy Stokes / Susan Robinson	
**2022** (76th)	Michelle Yeoh †	Everything Everywhere All at Once	Evelyn Quan Wang	
**2023** (77th)	**Emma Stone** †	**Poor Things**	**Bella Baxter**	
**2023** (77th)	Fantasia Barrino	The Color Purple	Celie Harris-Johnson	
**2023** (77th)	Sandra Hüller	Anatomy of a Fall	Sandra Voyter	
**2023** (77th)	Carey Mulligan	Maestro	Felicia Montealegre	
**2023** (77th)	Vivian Oparah	Rye Lane	Yas	
**2023** (77th)	Margot Robbie	Barbie	Barbie	
**2024** (78th)	**Mikey Madison** †	**Anora**	**Anora "Ani" Mikheeva**	
**2024** (78th)	Cynthia Erivo	Wicked	Elphaba Thropp	
**2024** (78th)	Karla Sofía Gascón	Emilia Pérez	Juan "Manitas" Del Monte / Emilia Pérez	
**2024** (78th)	Marianne Jean-Baptiste	Hard Truths	Pansy Deacon	
**2024** (78th)	Demi Moore	The Substance	Elisabeth Sparkle	
**2024** (78th)	Saoirse Ronan	The Outrun	Rona	
**2025** (79th)	**Jessie Buckley** †	**Hamnet**	**Agnes Shakespeare**	
**2025** (79th)	Rose Byrne	If I Had Legs I'd Kick You	Linda	
**2025** (79th)	Kate Hudson	Song Sung Blue	Claire Sardina	
**2025** (79th)	Chase Infiniti	One Battle After Another	Willa Ferguson	
**2025** (79th)	Renate Reinsve	Sentimental Value	Nora Borg	
**2025** (79th)	Emma Stone	Bugonia	Michelle Fuller	

== Superlatives ==
Superlative	Best Actress in a Leading Role		Best Supporting Actress		Overall (including Most Promising Newcomer)	
Actress with most awards	Maggie Smith	4	Judi Dench	3	Judi Dench	6
Actress with most British Actress Awards (until 1967)	Audrey Hepburn	3	—	—	Audrey Hepburn	3
Actress with most Foreign Actress Awards (until 1967)	Simone Signoret	3	—	—	Simone Signoret	3
Actress with most nominations	Meryl Streep	12	Judi Dench	9	Judi Dench; Meryl Streep	15
Actress with most British Actress Award nominations (until 1967)	Audrey Hepburn	5	—	—	Audrey Hepburn	5
Actress with most Foreign Actress Award nominations (until 1967)	Simone Signoret	6	—	—	Simone Signoret	6

== Multiple nominations ==
12 nominations

- Meryl Streep

8 nominations

- Maggie Smith

7 nominations

- Anne Bancroft
- Shirley MacLaine

6 nominations

- Julie Christie
- Jane Fonda
- Simone Signoret

5 nominations

- Cate Blanchett
- Judi Dench
- Audrey Hepburn
- Katharine Hepburn
- Saoirse Ronan
- Emma Thompson
- Kate Winslet

4 nominations

- Deborah Kerr
- Helen Mirren
- Joanne Woodward

3 nominations

- Amy Adams
- Stéphane Audran
- Annette Bening
- Viola Davis
- Edith Evans
- Mia Farrow
- Ava Gardner
- Glenda Jackson
- Scarlett Johansson
- Diane Keaton
- Nicole Kidman
- Frances McDormand
- Sarah Miles
- Julianne Moore
- Sissy Spacek
- Emma Stone
- Elizabeth Taylor
- Charlize Theron
- Emily Watson
- Renée Zellweger

2 nominations

- Anouk Aimée
- Peggy Ashcroft
- Jessie Buckley
- Leslie Caron
- Glenn Close
- Marion Cotillard
- Judy Davis
- Faye Dunaway
- Jodie Foster
- Lady Gaga
- Susan Hayward
- Judy Holliday
- Kate Hudson
- Celia Johnson
- Grace Kelly
- Anna Magnani
- Giulietta Masina
- Virginia McKenna
- Melina Mercouri
- Hayley Mills
- Yvonne Mitchell
- Marilyn Monroe
- Jeanne Moreau
- Carey Mulligan
- Patricia Neal
- Natalie Portman
- Renate Reinsve
- Emmanuelle Riva
- Margot Robbie
- Julia Roberts
- Rachel Roberts
- Susan Sarandon
- Maria Schell
- Kristin Scott Thomas
- Jean Simmons
- Barbra Streisand
- Sylvia Syms
- Jessica Tandy
- Audrey Tautou
- Uma Thurman
- Rita Tushingham
- Liv Ullmann
- Julie Walters
- Reese Witherspoon
- Michelle Yeoh
- Ziyi Zhang

== Multiple wins ==
4 wins

- Maggie Smith

3 wins

- Anne Bancroft
- Cate Blanchett
- Audrey Hepburn
- Simone Signoret (2 consecutive)

2 wins

- Leslie Caron
- Judi Dench
- Jane Fonda (consecutive)
- Katharine Hepburn
- Shirley MacLaine (consecutive)
- Frances McDormand
- Patricia Neal
- Rachel Roberts
- Emma Stone
- Meryl Streep
- Emma Thompson

== See also ==
- Academy Award for Best Actress
- Actor Award for Outstanding Performance by a Female Actor in a Leading Role
- Best Actress
- Critics' Choice Movie Award for Best Actress
- Golden Globe Award for Best Actress in a Motion Picture – Drama
- Golden Globe Award for Best Actress in a Motion Picture – Musical or Comedy
- Independent Spirit Award for Best Lead Performance
- Lists of acting awards
- List of film awards for lead actress

== Notes ==
A^{1} ^{2} ^{3} ^{4} ^{5} ^{6} ^{7} ^{8} ^{9} ^{10} : Rules from the 1960s to the 1970s allowed for a performer to receive a single citation which could honor their work in more than one film. Shirley MacLaine, Julie Andrews, Julie Christie, Bibi Andersson, Katharine Hepburn, Barbra Streisand, Katharine Ross, Goldie Hawn, and Stéphane Audran were all nominated for their roles in two different films in the same category, while Mia Farrow was nominated for three films.
B: Elliot Page was nominated before his gender transition in 2020.
C^{1} ^{2} : Emmanuelle Riva and Marion Cotillard both received nominations for French-speaking roles. It was the first time that multiple foreign-language performances were nominated for Best Actress in the same year since separate Best Foreign Actress and Best British Actress awards were folded into a single category in 1968.
