= 15th AACTA International Awards =

2026 film and television awards

- Date: 6 February 2026
- Site: Home of the Arts, Gold Coast, Queensland
- Hosted by: Celeste Barber

Highlights
- Best Film: One Battle After Another
- Most awards: One Battle After Another (2)
- Most nominations: One Battle After Another (7)

The 15th Australian Academy of Cinema and Television Arts International Awards, commonly known as the AACTA International Awards, was presented by the Australian Academy of Cinema and Television Arts (AACTA), a non-profit organisation whose aim is to identify, award, promote and celebrate Australia's greatest achievements in film and television. Awards were handed out for the best films of 2025, regardless of the country of origin, and are the international counterpart to the awards for Australian films. The winners were announced on 6 February 2026.

The nominations were announced on 18 December 2025. Paul Thomas Anderson's action thriller One Battle After Another led the film nominations with seven, followed by Hamnet with six. For the television categories, Netflix limited series Adolescence was the most nominated program with four nods.

The ceremony was broadcast on Channel Ten on 6 February 2026, with an extended version available on Binge and Foxtel the following day on 7 February. Comedian and media personality Celeste Barber served as the ceremony's host.

== Winners and nominees ==
=== Film ===
Best Film: One Battle After Another; Hamnet; Marty Supreme; Nuremberg; Sinners	Best Direction: Paul Thomas Anderson – One Battle After Another; Ryan Coogler – Sinners; Guillermo del Toro – Frankenstein; Josh Safdie – Marty Supreme; Chloé Zhao – Hamnet
Best Actor: Timothée Chalamet – Marty Supreme as Marty Mauser; Russell Crowe – Nuremberg as Hermann Göring; Leonardo DiCaprio – One Battle After Another as Bob Ferguson; Joel Edgerton – Train Dreams as Robert Grainier; Hugh Jackman – Song Sung Blue as Mike "Lightning" Sardina	Best Actress: Rose Byrne – If I Had Legs I'd Kick You as Linda; Jessie Buckley – Hamnet as Agnes Shakespeare; Kate Hudson – Song Sung Blue as Claire "Thunder" Sardina; Chase Infiniti – One Battle After Another as Willa Ferguson; Renate Reinsve – Sentimental Value as Nora Borg
Best Supporting Actor: Jacob Elordi – Frankenstein as The Creature; Benicio del Toro – One Battle After Another as Sensei Sergio St. Carlos; Paul Mescal – Hamnet as William Shakespeare; Dacre Montgomery – Dead Man's Wire as Richard Hall; Sean Penn – One Battle After Another as Col. Steven J. Lockjaw	Best Supporting Actress: Amy Madigan – Weapons as Gladys; Glenn Close – Wake Up Dead Man: A Knives Out Mystery as Martha Delacroix; Elle Fanning – Sentimental Value as Rachel Kemp; Mia Goth – Frankenstein as Lady Elizabeth Harlander / Baroness Claire Frankenstein; Emily Watson – Hamnet as Mary Shakespeare
Best Screenplay: Joachim Trier and Eskil Vogt – Sentimental Value; Noah Oppenheim – A House of Dynamite; Maggie O'Farrell and Chloé Zhao – Hamnet; Ronald Bronstein and Josh Safdie – Marty Supreme; Paul Thomas Anderson – One Battle After Another

=== Television ===
Best Comedy Series: The Studio; Hacks; Only Murders in the Building; Shrinking; The Bear	Best Drama Series: Adolescence; Severance; Slow Horses; The Diplomat; The Pitt
Best Actor in a Series: Gary Oldman – Slow Horses as Jackson Lamb; Owen Cooper – Adolescence as Jamie Miller; Stephen Graham – Adolescence as Eddie Miller; Seth Rogen – The Studio as Matt Remick; Noah Wyle – The Pitt as Dr. Michael "Robby" Robinavitch	Best Actress in a Series: Sarah Snook – All Her Fault as Marissa Irvine; Erin Doherty – Adolescence as Briony Ariston; Keri Russell – The Diplomat as Kate Wyler; Jean Smart – Hacks as Deborah Vance; Michelle Williams – Dying for Sex as Molly Kochan
