= AACTA International Award for Best Actor =

Award by the Australian Film Institute

Best International Actor AACTA Award
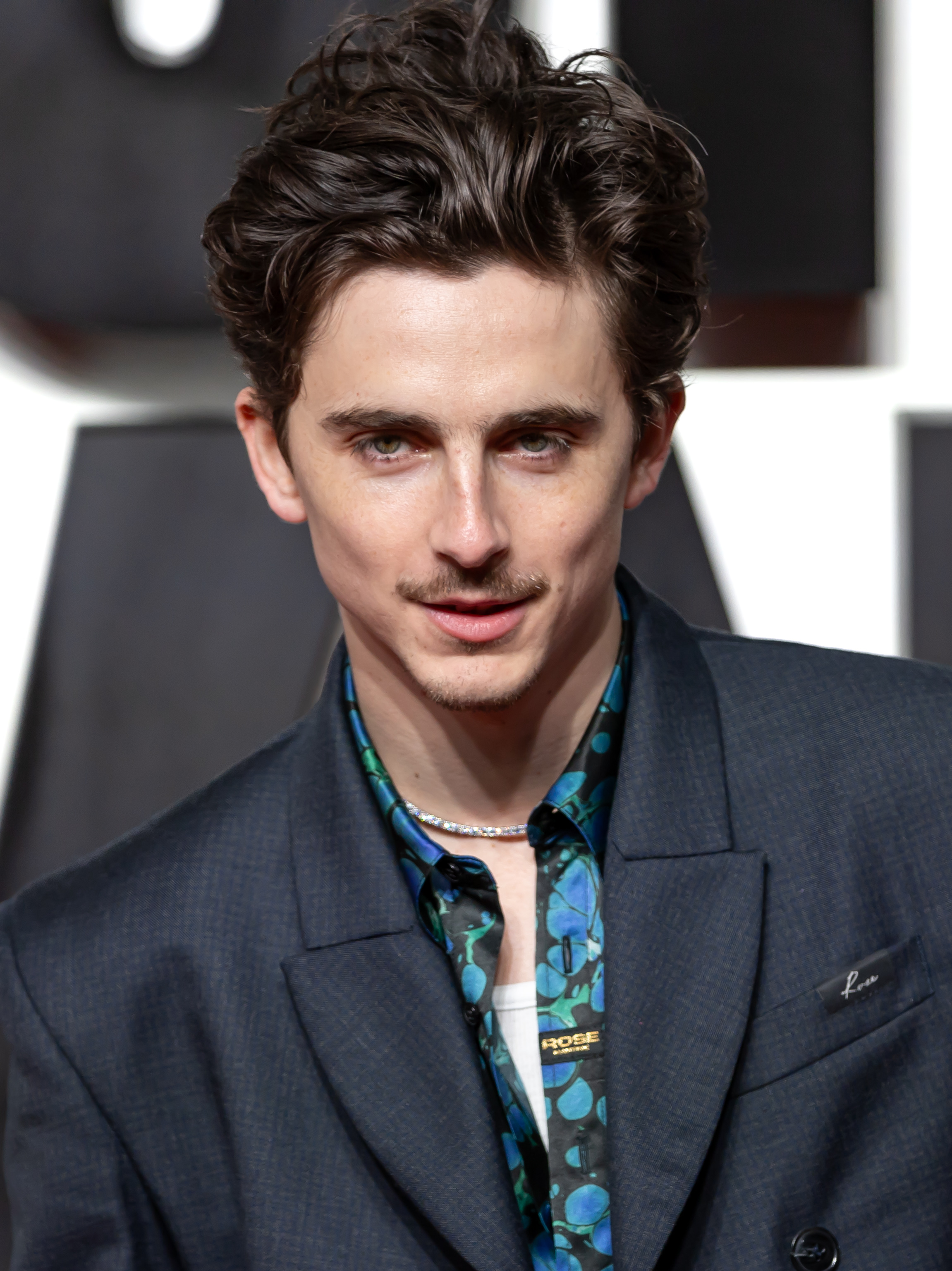
- The 2025 recipient: Timothée Chalamet
- Country: Australia
- Presented by: Australian Academy of Cinema and Television Arts (AACTA)
- First award: 2012
- Currently held by: Timothée Chalamet, Marty Supreme (2025)
- Website: http://www.aacta.org

The AACTA International Award for Best Actor is an award that is presented by the Australian Academy of Cinema and Television Arts (AACTA), for a performance by a male actor in a film made outside Australia. It was first handed out by the Academy after its establishment in 2011 by the Australian Film Institute (AFI), to replace the AFI International Award for Best Actor (2005–2010). The winners and nominees for 2011 were determined by a jury. The award was presented at the inaugural AACTA International Awards in Los Angeles, on 27 January 2012.

== Winners and nominees ==
In the following table, the winner is marked in a separate colour, and highlighted in boldface; the nominees are those that are not highlighted or in boldface.

- † - indicates a winner of the Academy Award for Best Actor
- ‡ - indicates a nominee for the Academy Award for Best Actor

=== 2010s ===
| Year | Actor | Film | Role |
|---|---|---|---|
**2011** (1st)
| **2011** (1st) | **Jean Dujardin** † | **The Artist** | **George Valentin** |
| **2011** (1st) | George Clooney ‡ | The Descendants | Matt King |
| **2011** (1st) | Leonardo DiCaprio | J. Edgar | J. Edgar Hoover |
| **2011** (1st) | Michael Fassbender | Shame | Brandon Sullivan |
| **2011** (1st) | Ryan Gosling | The Ides of March | Stephen Meyers |
| **2011** (1st) | Brad Pitt ‡ | Moneyball | Billy Beane |
**2012** (2nd)
| **2012** (2nd) | **Daniel Day-Lewis** † | **Lincoln** | **Abraham Lincoln** |
| **2012** (2nd) | Bradley Cooper ‡ | Silver Linings Playbook | Patrick "Pat" Solitano, Jr. |
| **2012** (2nd) | John Hawkes | The Sessions | Mark O'Brien |
| **2012** (2nd) | Hugh Jackman ‡ | Les Misérables | Jean Valjean |
| **2012** (2nd) | Joaquin Phoenix ‡ | The Master | Freddie Quell |
| **2012** (2nd) | Denzel Washington ‡ | Flight | Captain William "Whip" Whitaker, Sr. |
**2013** (3rd)
| **2013** (3rd) | **Chiwetel Ejiofor** ‡ | **12 Years a Slave** | **Solomon Northup** |
| **2013** (3rd) | Christian Bale ‡ | American Hustle | Irving Rosenfeld |
| **2013** (3rd) | Leonardo DiCaprio ‡ | The Wolf of Wall Street | Jordan Belfort |
| **2013** (3rd) | Tom Hanks | Captain Phillips | Captain Richard Phillips |
| **2013** (3rd) | Matthew McConaughey † | Dallas Buyers Club | Ron Woodroof |
**2014** (4th)
| **2014** (4th) | **Michael Keaton** ‡ | **Birdman or (The Unexpected Virtue of Ignorance)** | **Riggan Thomson** |
| **2014** (4th) | Steve Carell ‡ | Foxcatcher | John du Pont |
| **2014** (4th) | Benedict Cumberbatch ‡ | The Imitation Game | Alan Turing |
| **2014** (4th) | Jake Gyllenhaal | Nightcrawler | Louis "Lou" Bloom |
| **2014** (4th) | Eddie Redmayne † | The Theory of Everything | Stephen Hawking |
**2015** (5th)
| **2015** (5th) | **Leonardo DiCaprio** † | **The Revenant** | **Hugh Glass** |
| **2015** (5th) | Steve Carell | The Big Short | Mark Baum |
| **2015** (5th) | Matt Damon ‡ | The Martian | Mark Watney |
| **2015** (5th) | Michael Fassbender ‡ | Steve Jobs | Steve Jobs |
| **2015** (5th) | Eddie Redmayne ‡ | The Danish Girl | Lili Elbe |
**2016** (6th)
| **2016** (6th) | **Casey Affleck** † | **Manchester by the Sea** | **Lee Chandler** |
| **2016** (6th) | Joel Edgerton | Loving | Richard Loving |
| **2016** (6th) | Andrew Garfield ‡ | Hacksaw Ridge | Desmond T. Doss |
| **2016** (6th) | Ryan Gosling ‡ | La La Land | Sebastian Wilder |
| **2016** (6th) | Denzel Washington ‡ | Fences | Troy Maxson |
**2017** (7th)
| **2017** (7th) | **Gary Oldman** † | **Darkest Hour** | **Winston Churchill** |
| **2017** (7th) | Timothée Chalamet ‡ | Call Me by Your Name | Elio Perlman |
| **2017** (7th) | Daniel Day-Lewis ‡ | Phantom Thread | Reynolds Woodcock |
| **2017** (7th) | Hugh Jackman | Logan | James Howlett / Logan / Wolverine |
| **2017** (7th) | Daniel Kaluuya ‡ | Get Out | Chris Washington |
**2018** (8th)
| **2018** (8th) | **Rami Malek** † | **Bohemian Rhapsody** | **Freddie Mercury** |
| **2018** (8th) | Christian Bale ‡ | Vice | Dick Cheney |
| **2018** (8th) | Bradley Cooper ‡ | A Star Is Born | Jackson Maine |
| **2018** (8th) | Hugh Jackman | The Front Runner | Gary Hart |
| **2018** (8th) | Viggo Mortensen ‡ | Green Book | Frank "Tony Lip" Vallelonga |
**2019** (9th)
| **2019** (9th) | **Adam Driver** ‡ | **Marriage Story** | **Charlie Barber** |
| **2019** (9th) | Christian Bale | Ford v Ferrari | Ken Miles |
| **2019** (9th) | Antonio Banderas ‡ | Pain and Glory | Salvador Mallo |
| **2019** (9th) | Robert De Niro | The Irishman | Frank "The Irishman" Sheeran |
| **2019** (9th) | Joaquin Phoenix † | Joker | Arthur Fleck / Joker |

=== 2020s ===
| Year | Actor | Film | Role |
|---|---|---|---|
**2020** (10th)
| **2020** (10th) | **Chadwick Boseman** ‡ | **Ma Rainey's Black Bottom** | **Levee Green** |
| **2020** (10th) | Riz Ahmed ‡ | Sound of Metal | Ruben Stone |
| **2020** (10th) | Adarsh Gourav | The White Tiger | Balram Halwai |
| **2020** (10th) | Anthony Hopkins † | The Father | Anthony |
| **2020** (10th) | Gary Oldman ‡ | Mank | Herman J. Mankiewicz |
**2021** (11th)
| **2021** (11th) | **Benedict Cumberbatch** ‡ | **The Power of the Dog** | **Phil Burbank** |
| **2021** (11th) | Andrew Garfield ‡ | tick, tick... BOOM! | Jonathan Larson |
| **2021** (11th) | Caleb Landry Jones | Nitram | Nitram |
| **2021** (11th) | Will Smith † | King Richard | Richard Williams |
| **2021** (11th) | Denzel Washington ‡ | The Tragedy of Macbeth | Lord Macbeth |
**2022** (12th)
| **2022** (12th) | **Austin Butler** ‡ | **Elvis** | **Elvis Presley** |
| **2022** (12th) | Joel Edgerton | The Stranger | Mark Frame |
| **2022** (12th) | Colin Farrell ‡ | The Banshees of Inisherin | Pádraic Súilleabháin |
| **2022** (12th) | Brendan Fraser † | The Whale | Charlie |
| **2022** (12th) | Hugh Jackman | The Son | Peter Miller |
**2023** (13th)
| **2023** (13th) | **Cillian Murphy** † | **Oppenheimer** | **J. Robert Oppenheimer** |
| **2023** (13th) | Bradley Cooper ‡ | Maestro | Leonard Bernstein |
| **2023** (13th) | Leonardo DiCaprio | Killers of the Flower Moon | Ernest Burkhart |
| **2023** (13th) | Andrew Scott | All of Us Strangers | Adam |
| **2023** (13th) | Jeffrey Wright ‡ | American Fiction | Thelonious "Monk" Ellison |
**2024** (14th)
| **2024** (14th) | **Ralph Fiennes** ‡ | **Conclave** | **Thomas Cardinal Lawrence** |
| **2024** (14th) | Adrien Brody † | The Brutalist | László Tóth |
| **2024** (14th) | Daniel Craig | Queer | William Lee |
| **2024** (14th) | Jonno Davies | Better Man | Robbie Williams |
| **2024** (14th) | Colman Domingo ‡ | Sing Sing | John "Divine G." Whitfield |
**2025** (15th)
| **2025** (15th) | **Timothée Chalamet** ‡ | **Marty Supreme** | **Marty Mauser** |
| **2025** (15th) | Russell Crowe | Nuremberg | Hermann Göring |
| **2025** (15th) | Leonardo DiCaprio ‡ | One Battle After Another | Bob Ferguson |
| **2025** (15th) | Joel Edgerton | Train Dreams | Robert Grainer |
| **2025** (15th) | Hugh Jackman | Song Sung Blue | Mike Sardina |

== See also ==
- AACTA Award for Best Actor in a Leading Role
- AACTA Awards
