= Song Sung Blue (disambiguation) =

"Song Sung Blue" is a song by Neil Diamond.

Song Sung Blue may also refer to:

- Song Sung Blue (album), 1972 Johnny Mathis release
- Song Sung Blue (2008 film), American biographical musical documentary
- Song Sung Blue (2025 film), American biographical musical drama
- A Song Sung Blue, 2023 Chinese coming-of-age drama film
