= Houston Film Critics Society Award for Best Actress =

Annual US film award

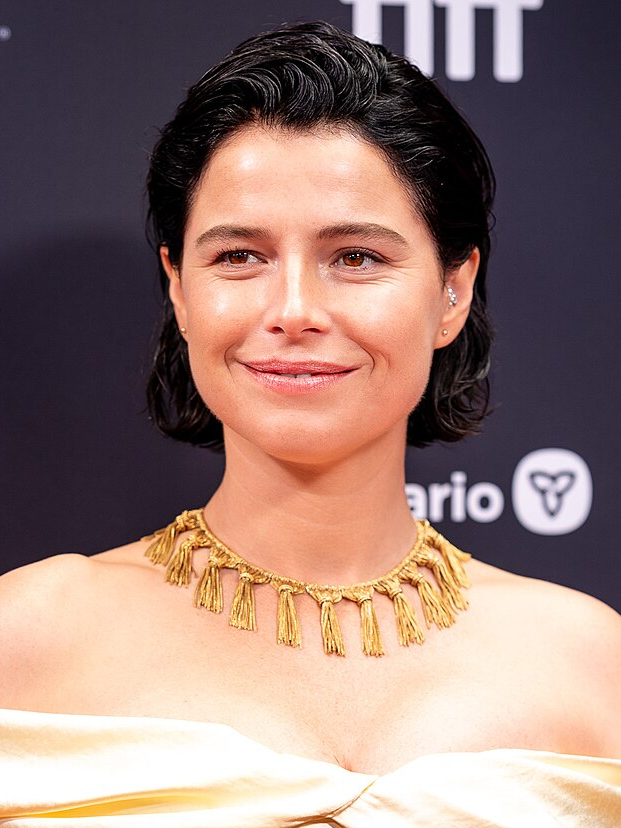
- The 2025 recipient: Jessie Buckley
- Awarded for: Best Performance by an Actress in a Leading Role
- Country: United States
- Presented by: Houston Film Critics Society
- First award: Julie Christie; Away from Her (2007)
- Currently held by: Jessie Buckley; Hamnet (2025)
- Website: houstonfilmcritics.org

The Houston Film Critics Society Award for Best Actress is an annual award given by the Houston Film Critics Society.

== Winners ==
- † = Winner of the Academy Award for Best Actress
- ‡ = Nominated of the Academy Award for Best Actress

=== 2000s ===
Year	Winner and nominees	Film	Role
2007	Julie Christie ‡	Away from Her	Fiona Anderson
2007	Amy Adams	Enchanted	Giselle
2007	Marion Cotillard †	La Vie en rose	Édith Piaf
2007	Angelina Jolie	A Mighty Heart	Mariane Pearl
2007	Laura Linney ‡	The Savages	Wendy Savage
2007	Elliot Page ‡	Juno	Juno MacGuff
2008	Anne Hathaway ‡	Rachel Getting Married	Kym Buchman
2008	Cate Blanchett	The Curious Case of Benjamin Button	Daisy Fuller
2008	Angelina Jolie ‡	Changeling	Christine Collins
2008	Melissa Leo ‡	Frozen River	Ray Eddy
2008	Meryl Streep ‡	Doubt	Sister Aloysius Beauvier
2008	Kate Winslet	Revolutionary Road	April Wheeler
2009	Carey Mulligan ‡	An Education	Jenny Mellor
2009	Sandra Bullock †	The Blind Side	Leigh Anne Tuohy
2009	Abbie Cornish	Bright Star	Fanny Brawne
2009	Saoirse Ronan	The Lovely Bones	Susie Salmon
2009	Gabourey Sidibe ‡	Precious	Claireece "Precious" Jones
2009	Meryl Streep ‡	Julie and Julia	Julia Child

=== 2010s ===
Year	Winner and nominees	Film	Role
2010	Natalie Portman †	Black Swan	Nina Sayers
2010	Annette Bening ‡	The Kids Are All Right	Dr. Nicole "Nic" Allgood
2010	Nicole Kidman ‡	Rabbit Hole	Becca Corbett
2010	Jennifer Lawrence ‡	Winter's Bone	Ree Dolly
2010	Noomi Rapace	The Girl with the Dragon Tattoo	Lisbeth Salander
2011	Tilda Swinton	We Need to Talk About Kevin	Eva Khatchadourian
2011	Viola Davis ‡	The Help	Aibileen Clark
2011	Elizabeth Olsen	Martha Marcy May Marlene	Martha / Marcy May / "Marlene Lewis"
2011	Meryl Streep †	The Iron Lady	Margaret Thatcher
2011	Michelle Williams ‡	My Week with Marilyn	Marilyn Monroe
2012	Jennifer Lawrence †	Silver Linings Playbook	Tiffany Maxwell
2012	Jessica Chastain ‡	Zero Dark Thirty	Maya
2012	Emmanuelle Riva ‡	Amour	Anne Laurent
2012	Quvenzhané Wallis ‡	Beasts of the Southern Wild	Hushpuppy
2012	Naomi Watts ‡	The Impossible	Maria Bennett
2013	Sandra Bullock ‡	Gravity	Dr. Ryan Stone
2013	Judi Dench ‡	Philomena	Philomena Lee
2013	Brie Larson	Short Term 12	Grace Howard
2013	Meryl Streep ‡	August: Osage County	Violet Weston
2013	Emma Thompson	Saving Mr. Banks	Pamela "P. L." Travers
2014	Julianne Moore †	Still Alice	Dr. Alice Daly-Howland
2014	Marion Cotillard ‡	Two Days, One Night	Sandra Bya
2014	Essie Davis	The Babadook	Amelia Vanek
2014	Felicity Jones ‡	The Theory of Everything	Jane Hawking
2014	Reese Witherspoon ‡	Wild	Cheryl Strayed
2015	Brie Larson †	Room	Joy "Ma" Newsome
2015	Cate Blanchett ‡	Carol	Carol Aird
2015	Emily Blunt	Sicario	Kate Macer
2015	Saoirse Ronan ‡	Brooklyn	Eilis Lacey
2015	Charlize Theron	Mad Max: Fury Road	Imperator Furiosa
2016	Natalie Portman ‡	Jackie	Jacqueline Kennedy Onassis
2016	Amy Adams	Arrival	Dr. Louise Banks
2016	Rebecca Hall	Christine	Christine Chubbuck
2016	Isabelle Huppert ‡	Elle	Michèle Leblanc
2016	Emma Stone †	La La Land	Mia Dolan
2017	Sally Hawkins ‡	The Shape of Water	Elisa Esposito
2017	Frances McDormand †	Three Billboards Outside Ebbing, Missouri	Mildred Hayes
2017	Brooklynn Prince	The Florida Project	Moonee
2017	Margot Robbie ‡	I, Tonya	Tonya Harding
2017	Saoirse Ronan ‡	Lady Bird	Christine "Lady Bird" McPherson
2018	Toni Collette	Hereditary	Annie Graham
2018	Glenn Close ‡	The Wife	Joan Castleman
2018	Olivia Colman †	The Favourite	Queen Anne
2018	Lady Gaga ‡	A Star Is Born	Ally Maine
2018	Melissa McCarthy ‡	Can You Ever Forgive Me?	Lee Israel
2019	Renée Zellweger †	Judy	Judy Garland
2019	Awkwafina	The Farewell	Billi Wang
2019	Scarlett Johansson ‡	Marriage Story	Nicole Barber
2019	Lupita Nyong'o	Us	Adelaide Wilson / Red
2019	Saoirse Ronan ‡	Little Women	Jo March
2019	Charlize Theron ‡	Bombshell	Megyn Kelly

=== 2020s ===
Year	Winner and nominees	Film	Role
2020	Carey Mulligan ‡	Promising Young Woman	Cassandra "Cassie" Thomas
2020	Viola Davis ‡	Ma Rainey's Black Bottom	Ma Rainey
2020	Sidney Flanigan	Never Rarely Sometimes Always	Autumn
2020	Vanessa Kirby ‡	Pieces of a Woman	Martha
2020	Frances McDormand †	Nomadland	Fern
2021	Jessica Chastain †	The Eyes of Tammy Faye	Tammy Faye Bakker
2021	Olivia Colman ‡	The Lost Daughter	Leda Caruso
2021	Penelope Cruz ‡	Parallel Mothers	Janis Martinez
2021	Alana Haim	Licorice Pizza	Alana Kane
2021	Emilia Jones	CODA	Ruby Rossi
2021	Kristen Stewart ‡	Spencer	Diana, Princess of Wales
2022	Cate Blanchett ‡	Tár	Lydia Tár
2022	Viola Davis	The Woman King	General Nanisca
2022	Danielle Deadwyler	Till	Mamie Till
2022	Emma Thompson	Good Luck to You, Leo Grande	Nancy Stokes / Susan Robinson
2022	Michelle Yeoh †	Everything Everywhere All at Once	Evelyn Wang
2023	Emma Stone †	Poor Things	Bella Baxter
2023	Fantasia Barrino	The Color Purple	Celie Harris-Johnson
2023	Lily Gladstone ‡	Killers of the Flower Moon	Mollie Kyle
2023	Greta Lee	Past Lives	Nora Moon
2023	Margot Robbie	Barbie	Barbie
2024	Mikey Madison †	Anora	Anora "Ani" Mikheeva
2024	Angelina Jolie	Maria	Maria Callas
2024	Cynthia Erivo ‡	Wicked	Elphaba Thropp
2024	Demi Moore ‡	The Substance	Elisabeth Sparkle
2024	Marianne Jean-Baptiste	Hard Truths	Pansey Deacon
2025	Jessie Buckley †	Hamnet	Agnes Shakespeare
2025	Rose Byrne ‡	If I Had Legs I'd Kick You	Linda
2025	Kate Hudson ‡	Song Sung Blue	Claire Sardina
2025	Chase Infiniti	One Battle After Another	Willa Ferguson
2025	Renate Reinsve ‡	Sentimental Value	Nora Borg
2025	Emma Stone ‡	Bugonia	Michelle Fuller
