= Actor Award for Outstanding Performance by a Female Actor in a Leading Role =

Award for acting achievement in film

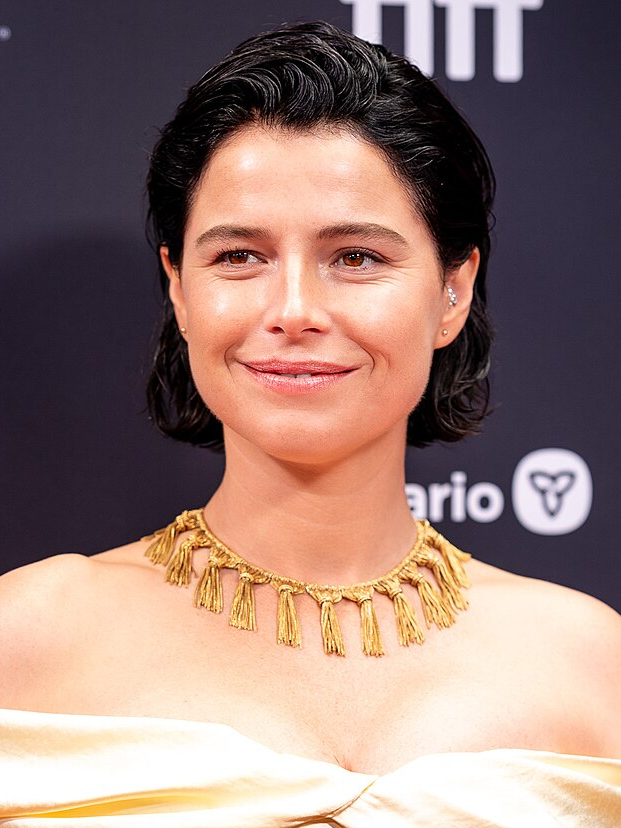
- The 2025 recipient: Jessie Buckley
- Awarded for: Outstanding Performance by a Female Actor in a Leading Role in a Motion Picture
- Location: Los Angeles, California
- Presented by: SAG-AFTRA
- First award: Jodie Foster for Nell (1994)
- Currently held by: Jessie Buckley for Hamnet (2025)
- Website: sagawards.org

The Actor Award for Outstanding Performance by a Female Actor in a Leading Role in a Motion Picture (formerly Screen Actors Guild Award for Outstanding Performance by a Female Actor in a Leading Role) is an award presented annually by the Screen Actors Guild. It has been presented since the 1st Screen Actors Guild Awards in 1995 to a female actor who has delivered an outstanding performance in a leading role in a film released that year.

The award has been presented 32 times, and 27 actresses have won the award. Jodie Foster was the award's first winner for Nell (1994). The most recent winner is Jessie Buckley who won for her performance in Hamnet (2025). Frances McDormand, Renée Zellweger, and Viola Davis have all won the award twice. Meryl Streep has the most nominations with ten.

== Winners and nominees ==
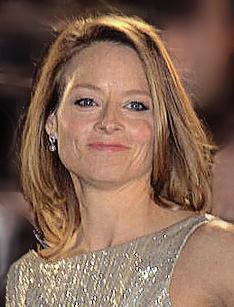
Jodie Foster was the award's first winner, for Nell (1994).

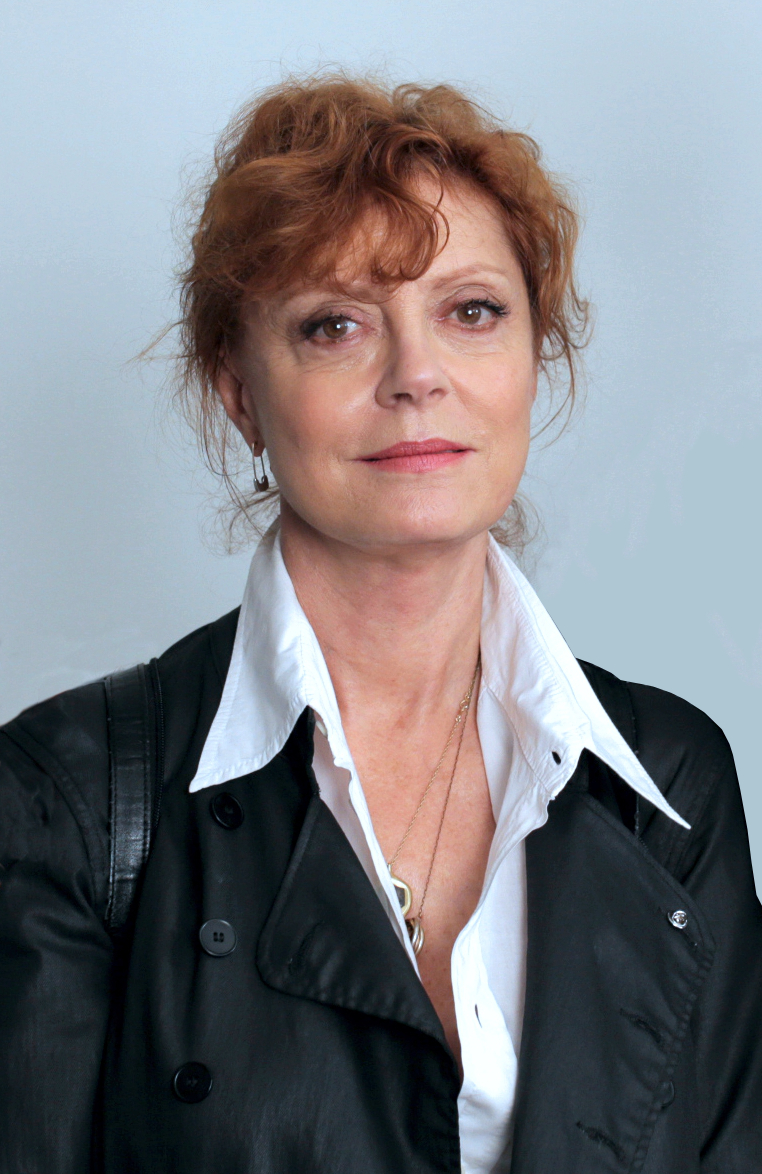
Susan Sarandon won for Dead Man Walking (1995).

Frances McDormand won twice for Fargo (1996) and Three Billboards Outside Ebbing, Missouri (2017).

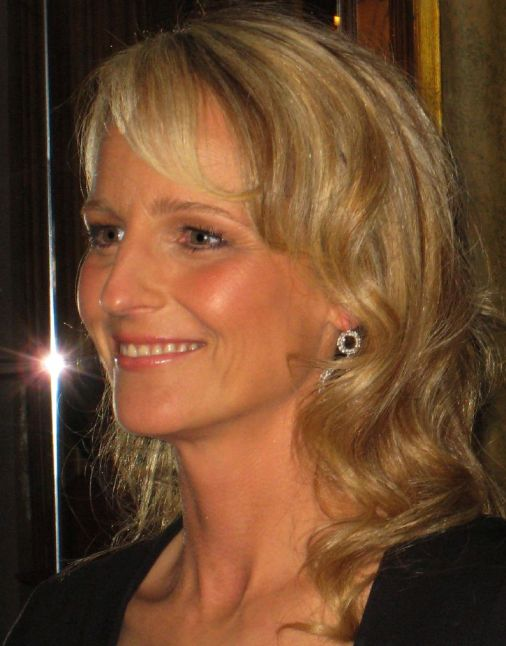
Helen Hunt won for As Good as It Gets (1997).

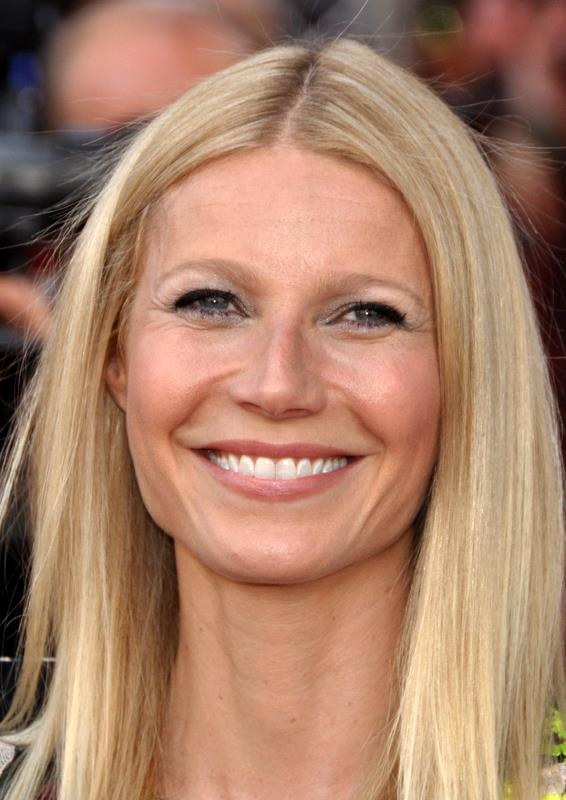
Gwyneth Paltrow won for Shakespeare in Love (1998).

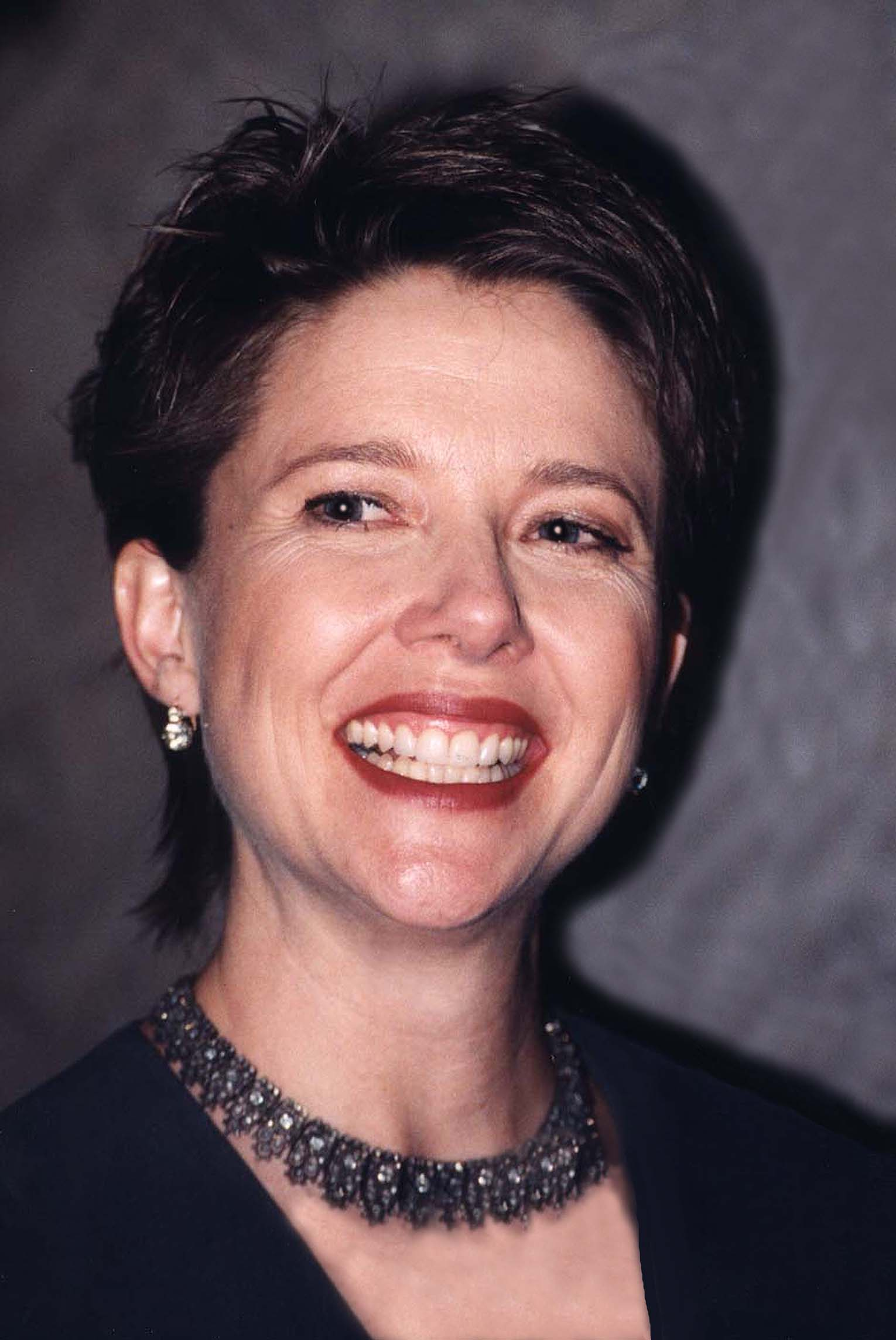
Annette Bening won for American Beauty (1999).

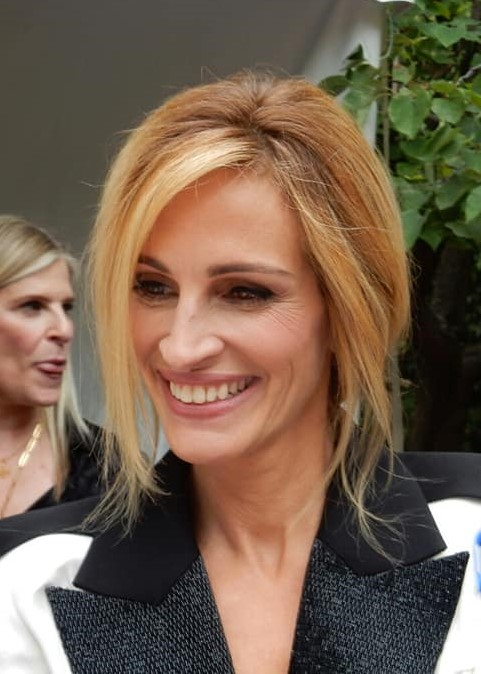
Julia Roberts won for Erin Brockovich (2000).

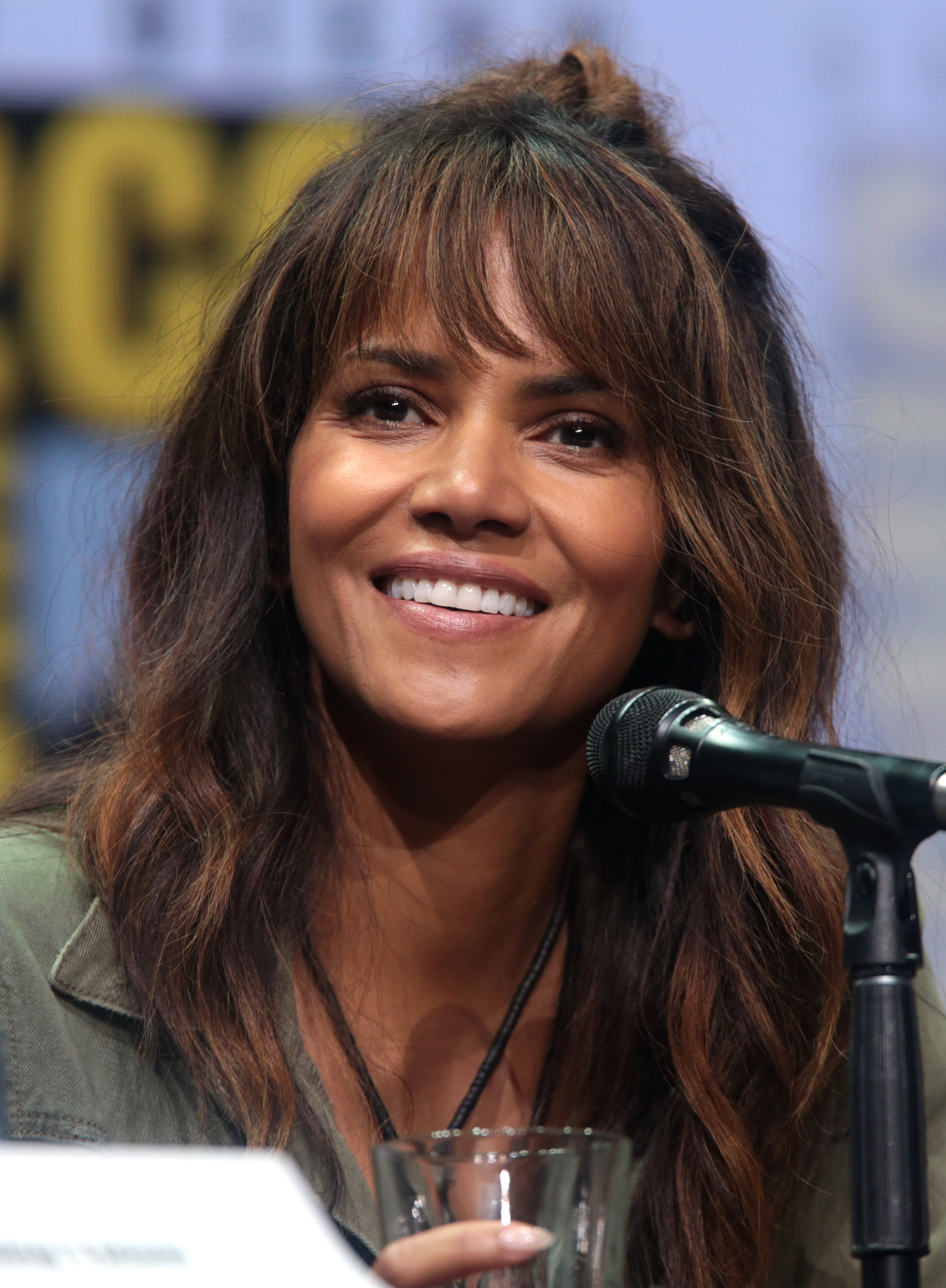
Halle Berry won for Monster's Ball (2001).

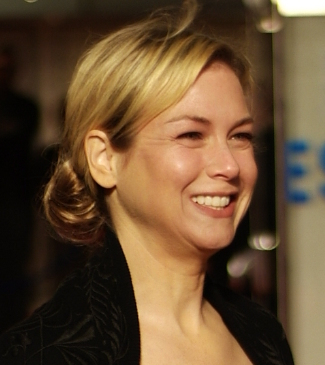
Renée Zellweger won twice for Chicago (2002), and Judy (2019).

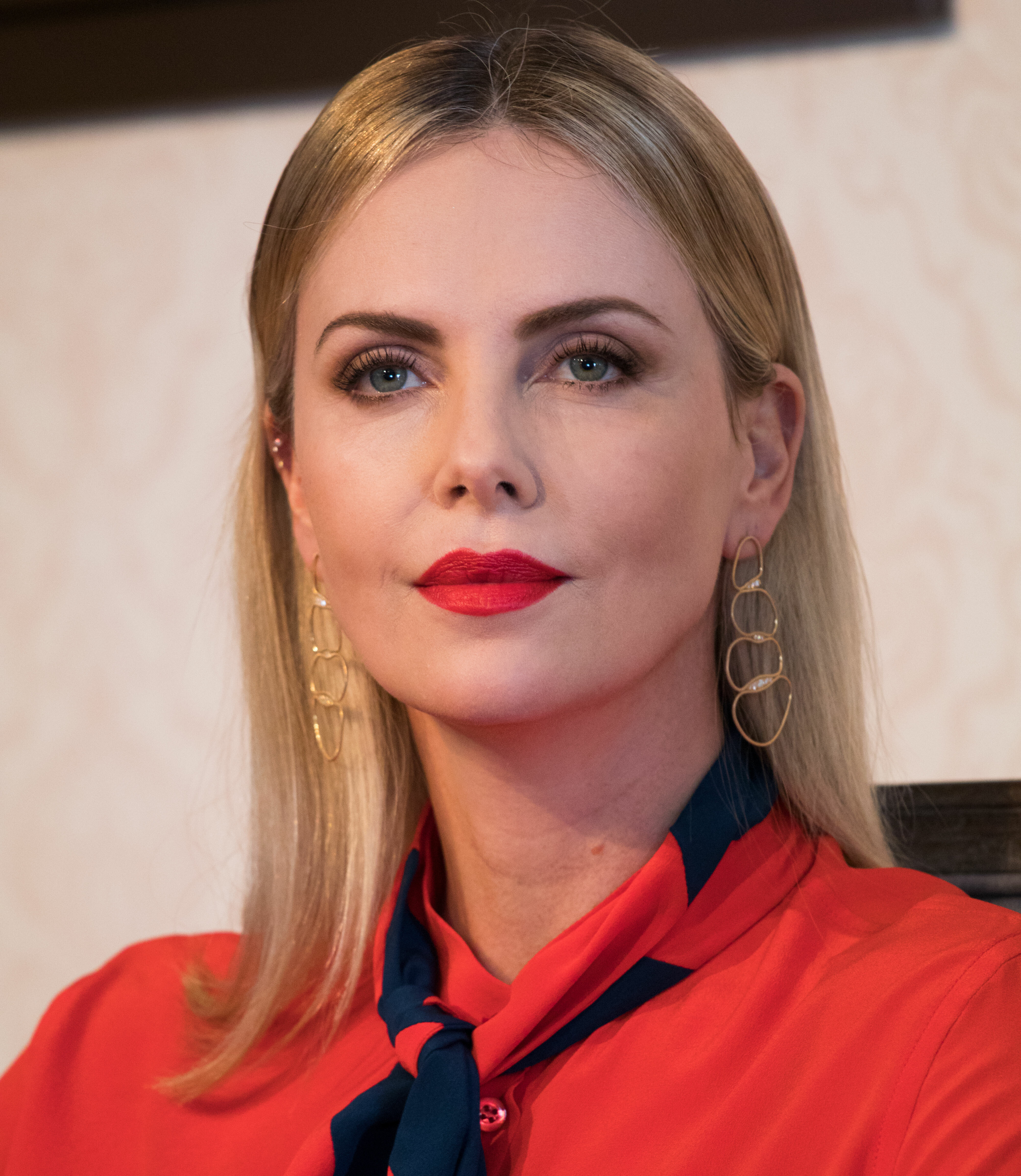
Charlize Theron won for Monster (2003).

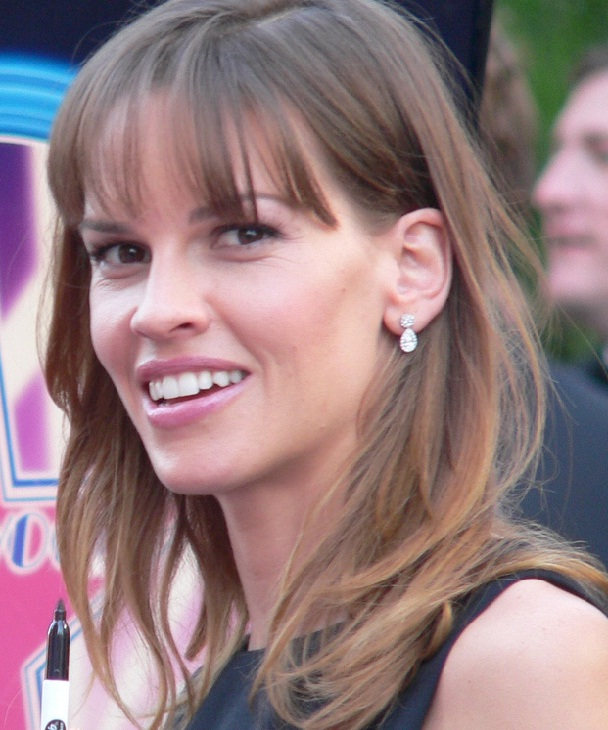
Hilary Swank won for Million Dollar Baby (2004).

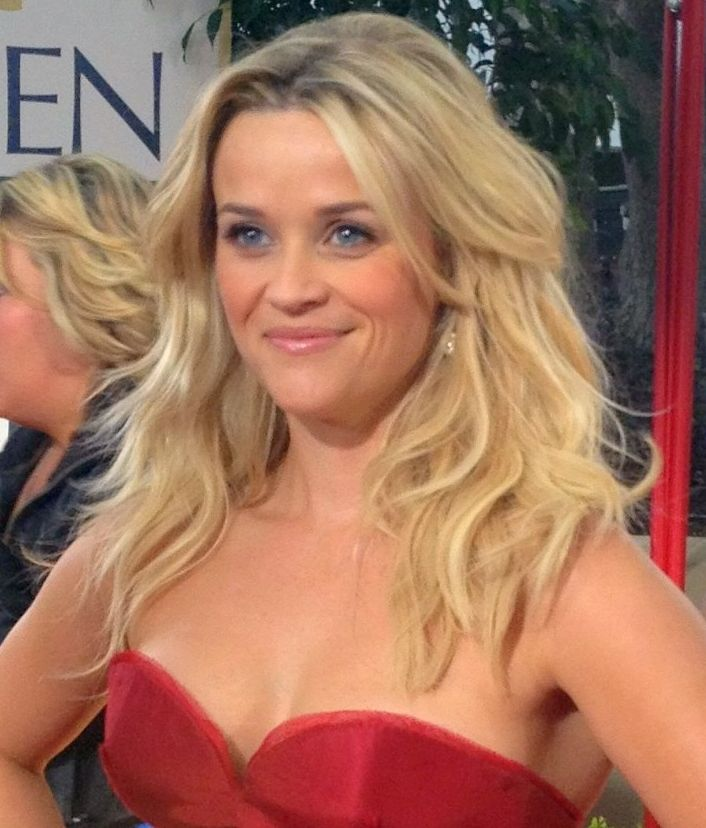
Reese Witherspoon won for Walk the Line (2005).

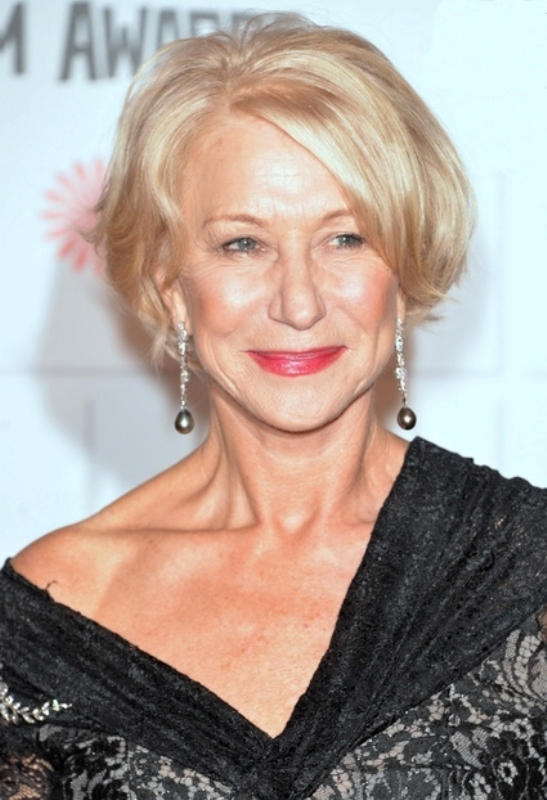
Helen Mirren won for The Queen (2006).

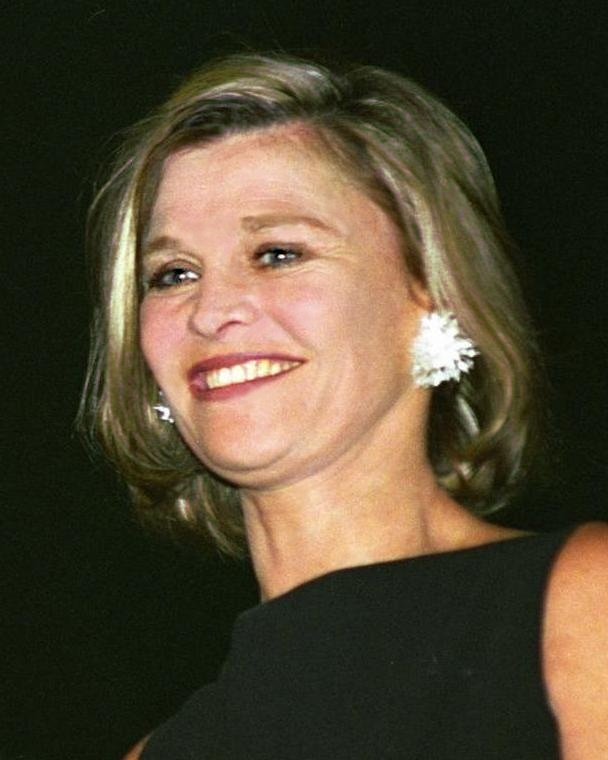
Julie Christie won for Away from Her (2007).

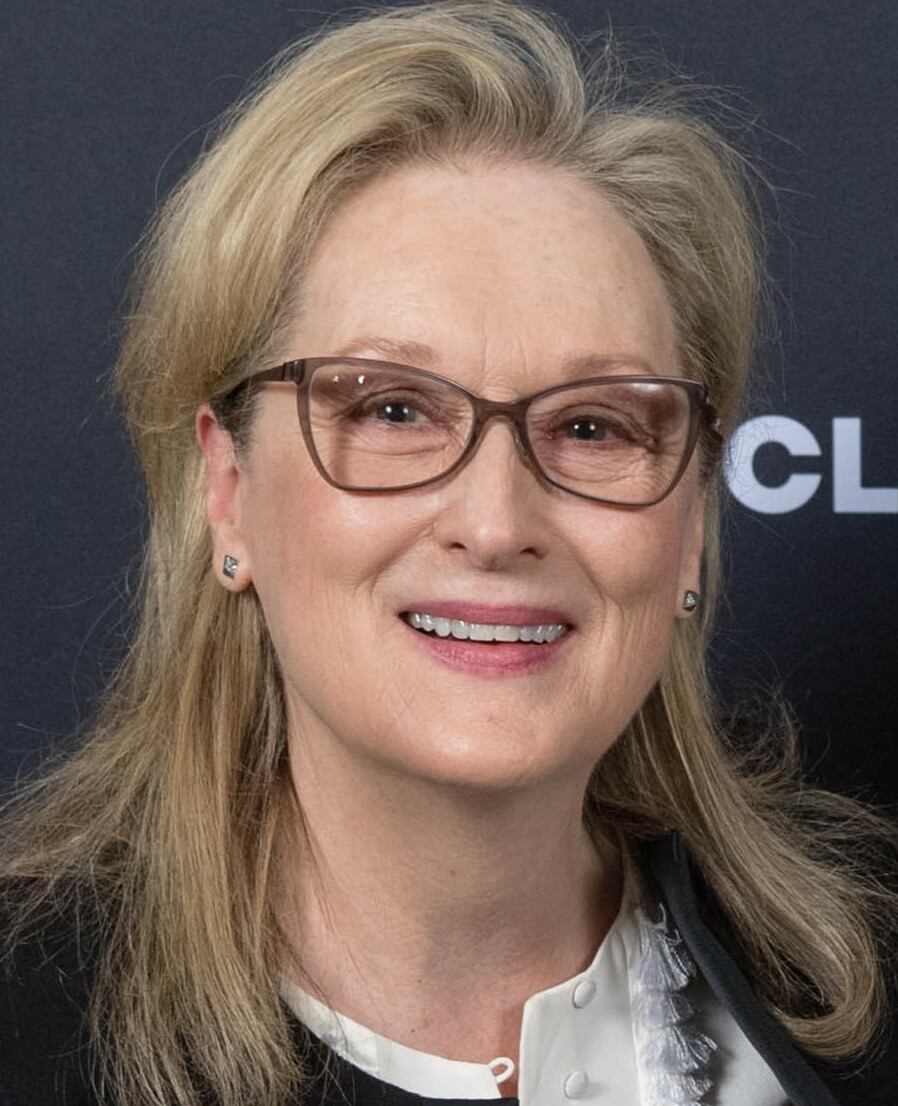
Meryl Streep won for Doubt (2008).

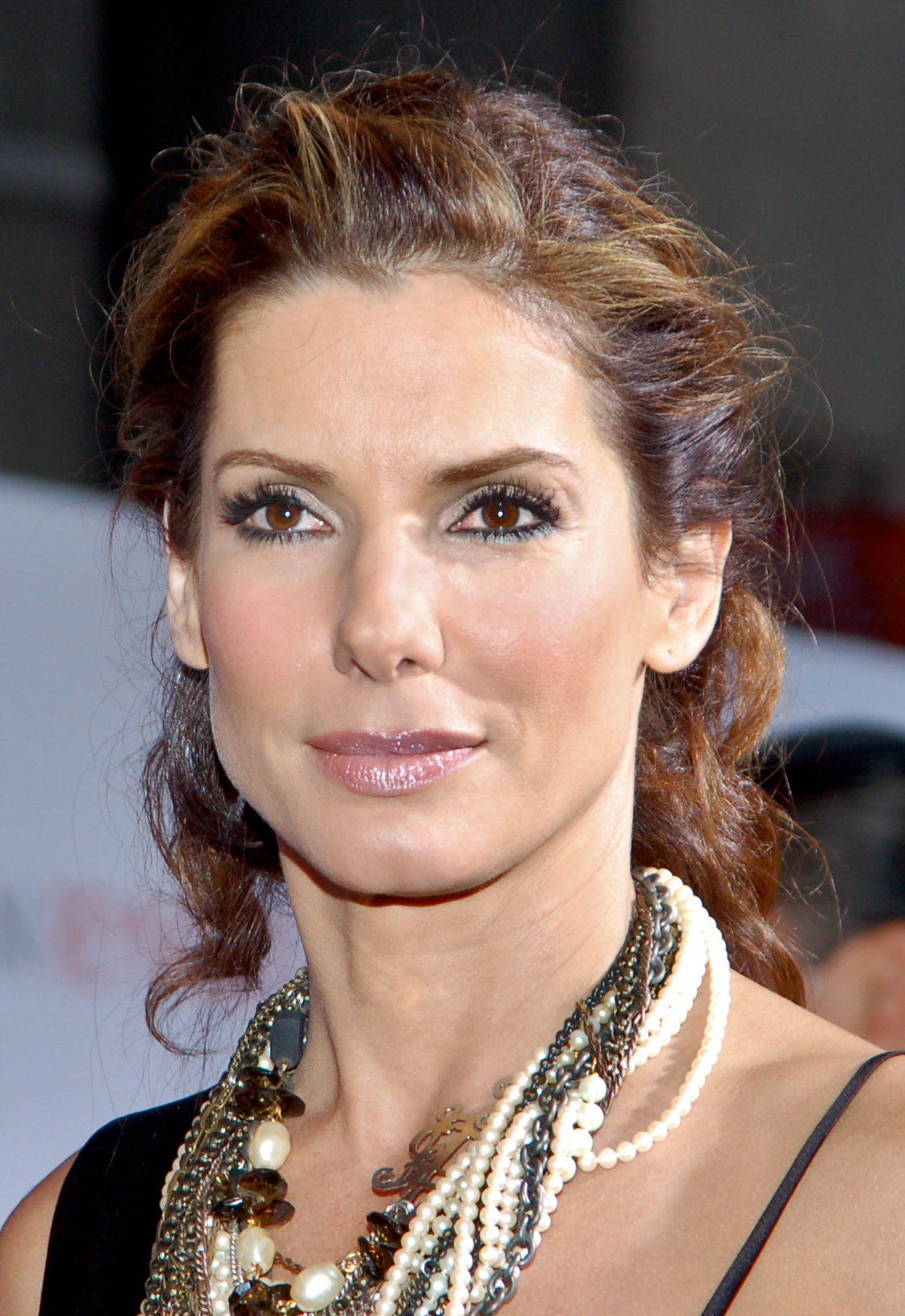
Sandra Bullock won for The Blind Side (2009).

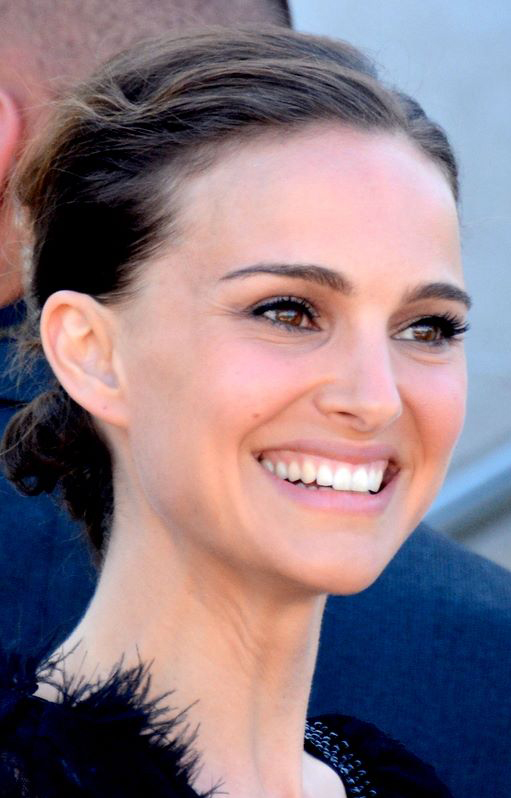
Natalie Portman won for Black Swan (2010).

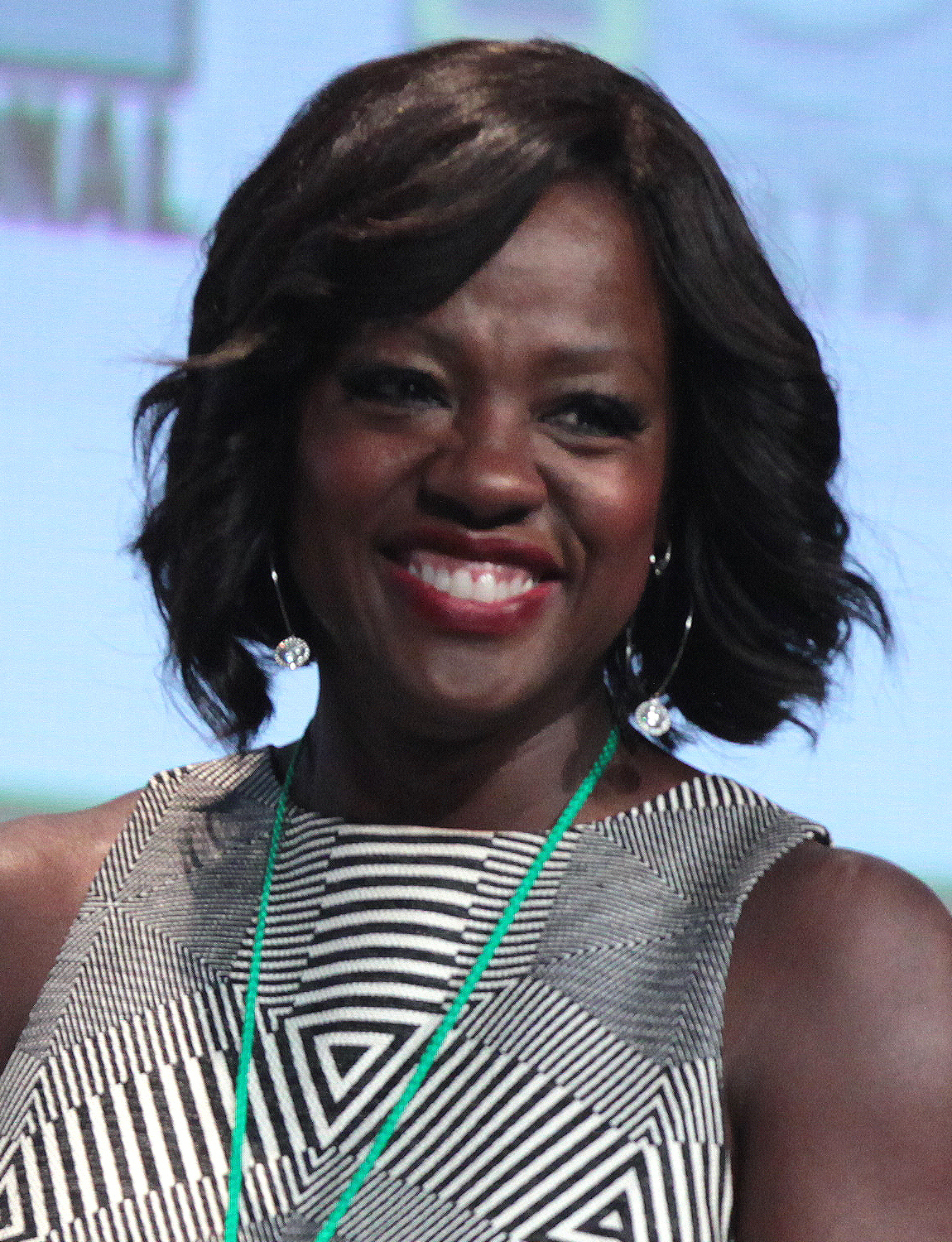
Viola Davis won twice for The Help (2011) and Ma Rainey's Black Bottom (2020).

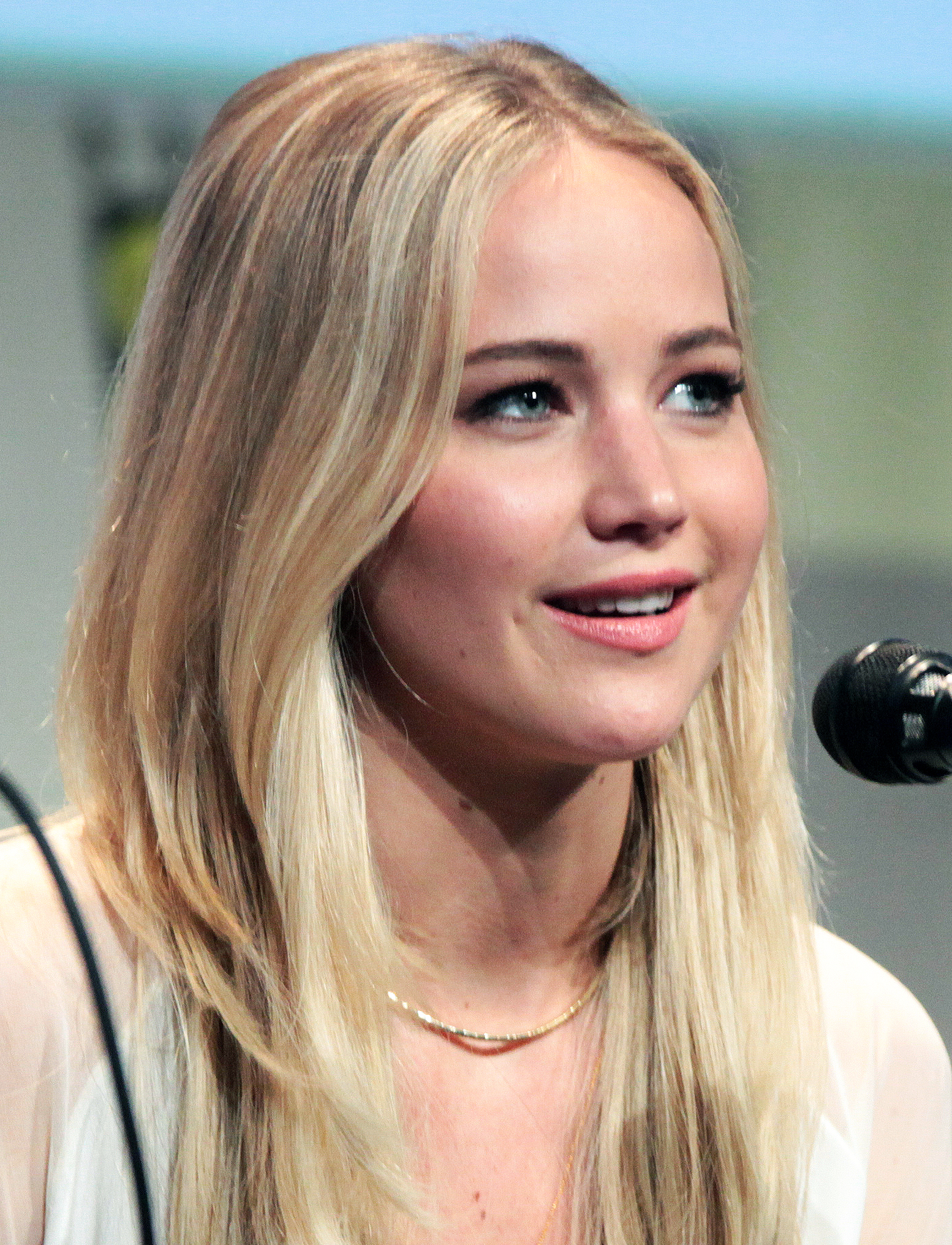
Jennifer Lawrence won for Silver Linings Playbook (2012).

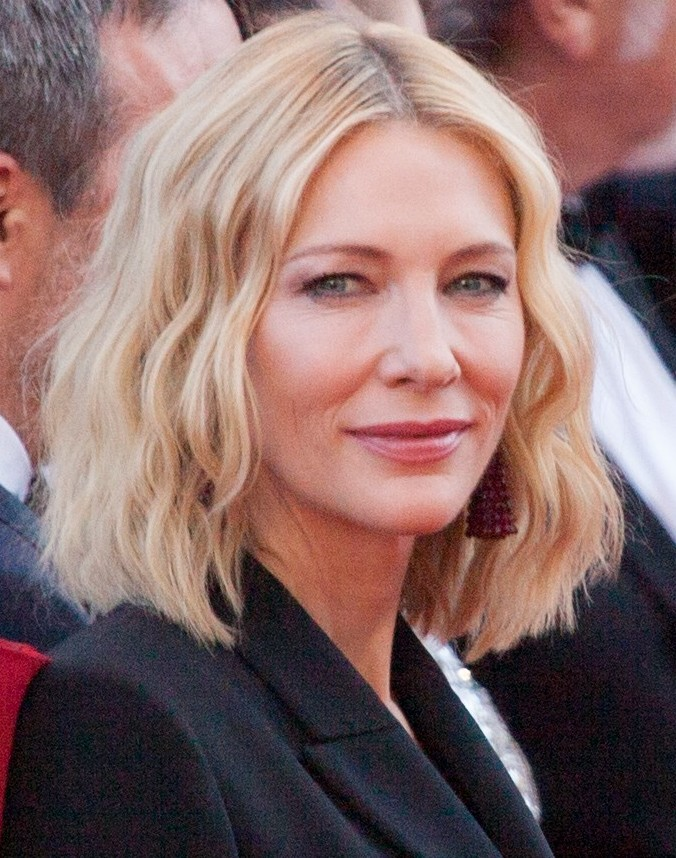
Cate Blanchett won for Blue Jasmine (2013).

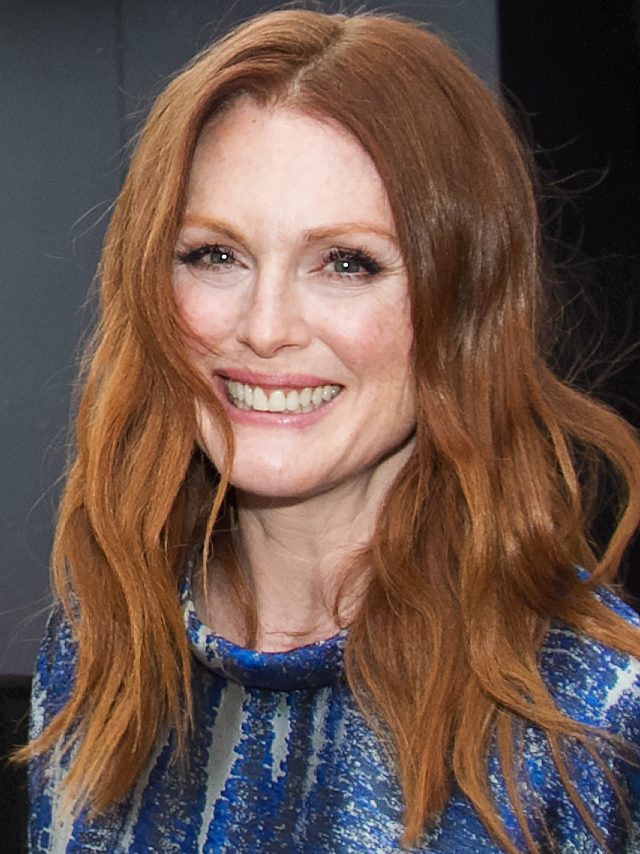
Julianne Moore won for Still Alice (2014).

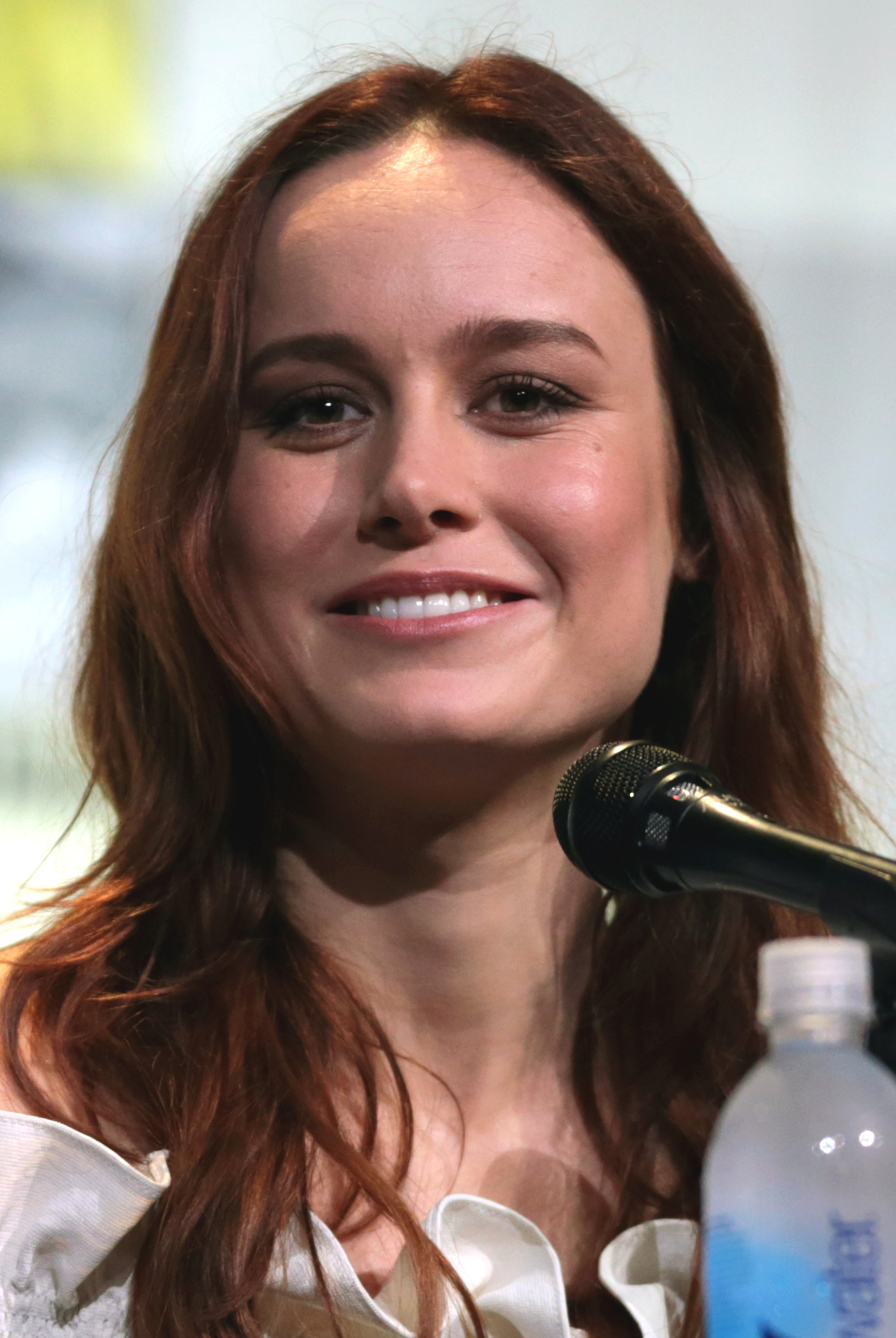
Brie Larson won for Room (2015).

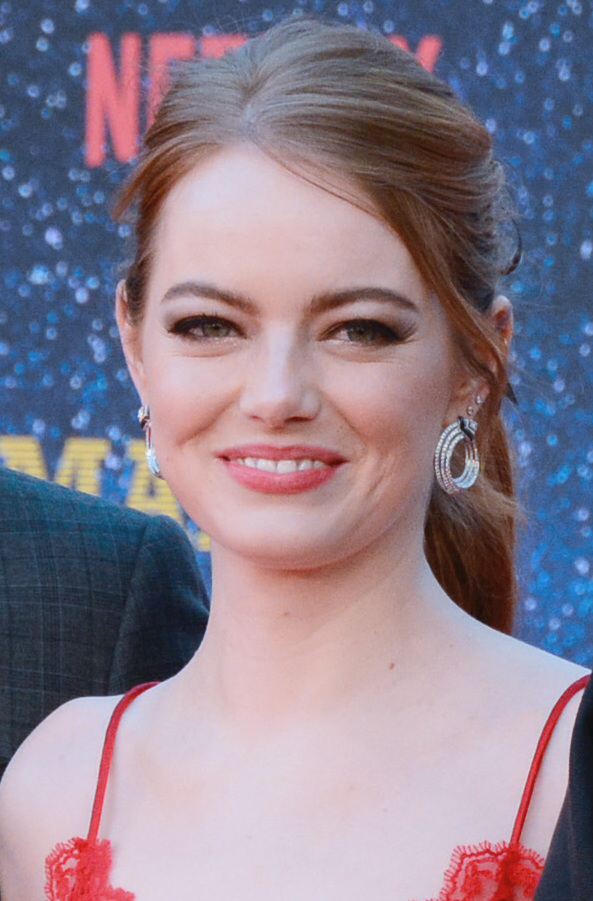
Emma Stone won for La La Land (2016).

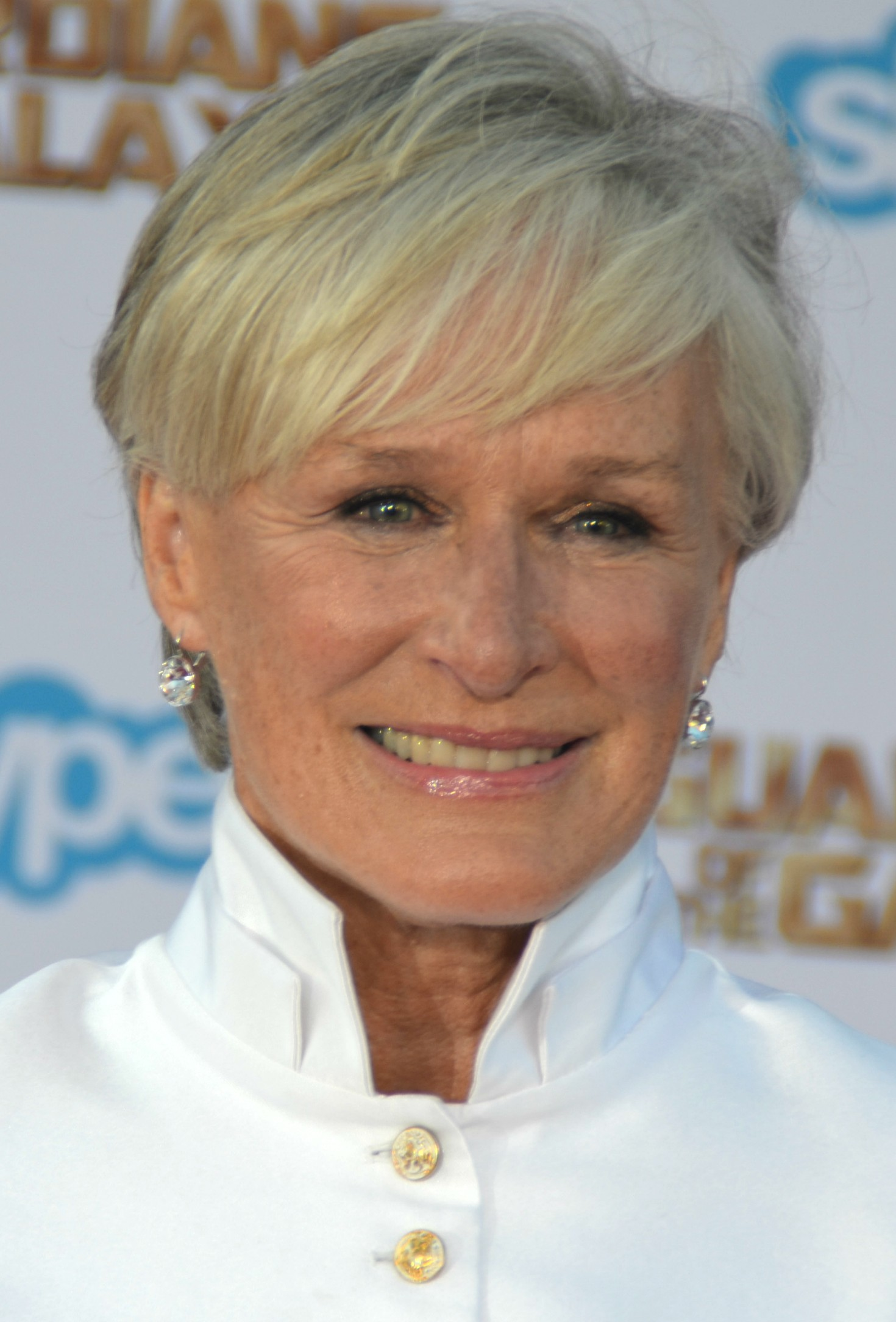
Glenn Close won for The Wife (2018).

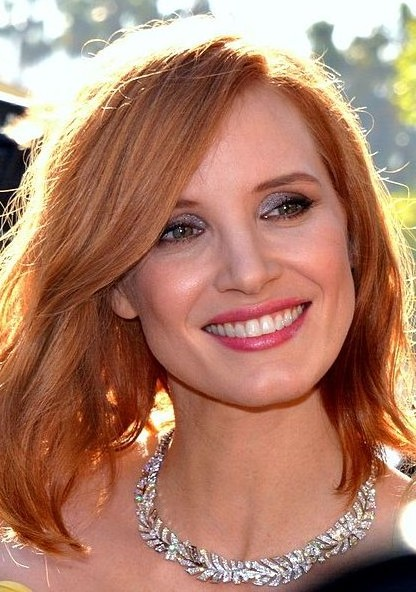
Jessica Chastain won for The Eyes of Tammy Faye (2021).

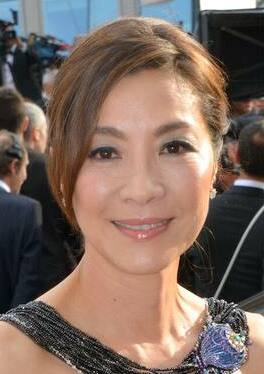
Michelle Yeoh won for Everything Everywhere All at Once (2022).

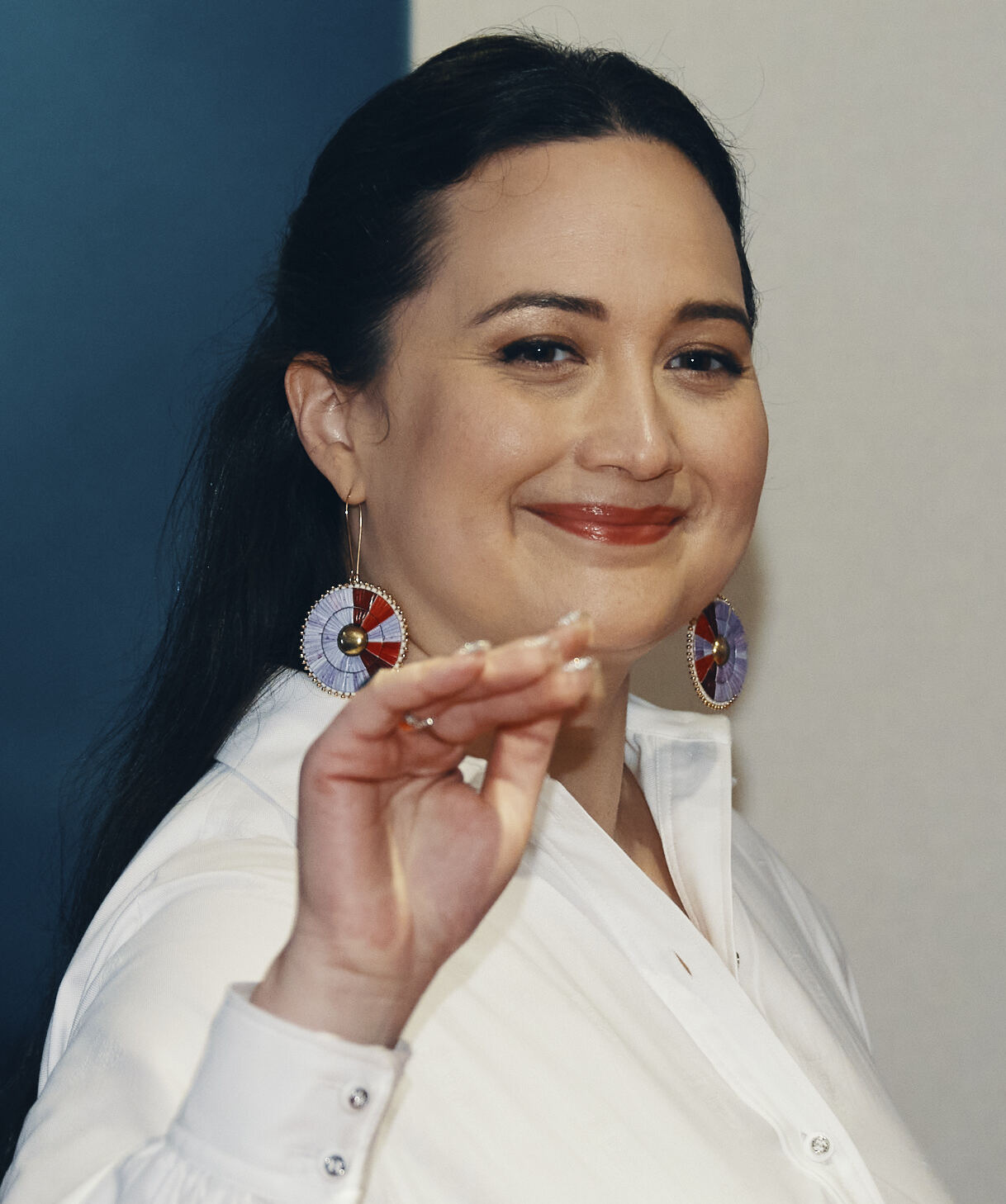
Lily Gladstone won for Killers of the Flower Moon (2023).

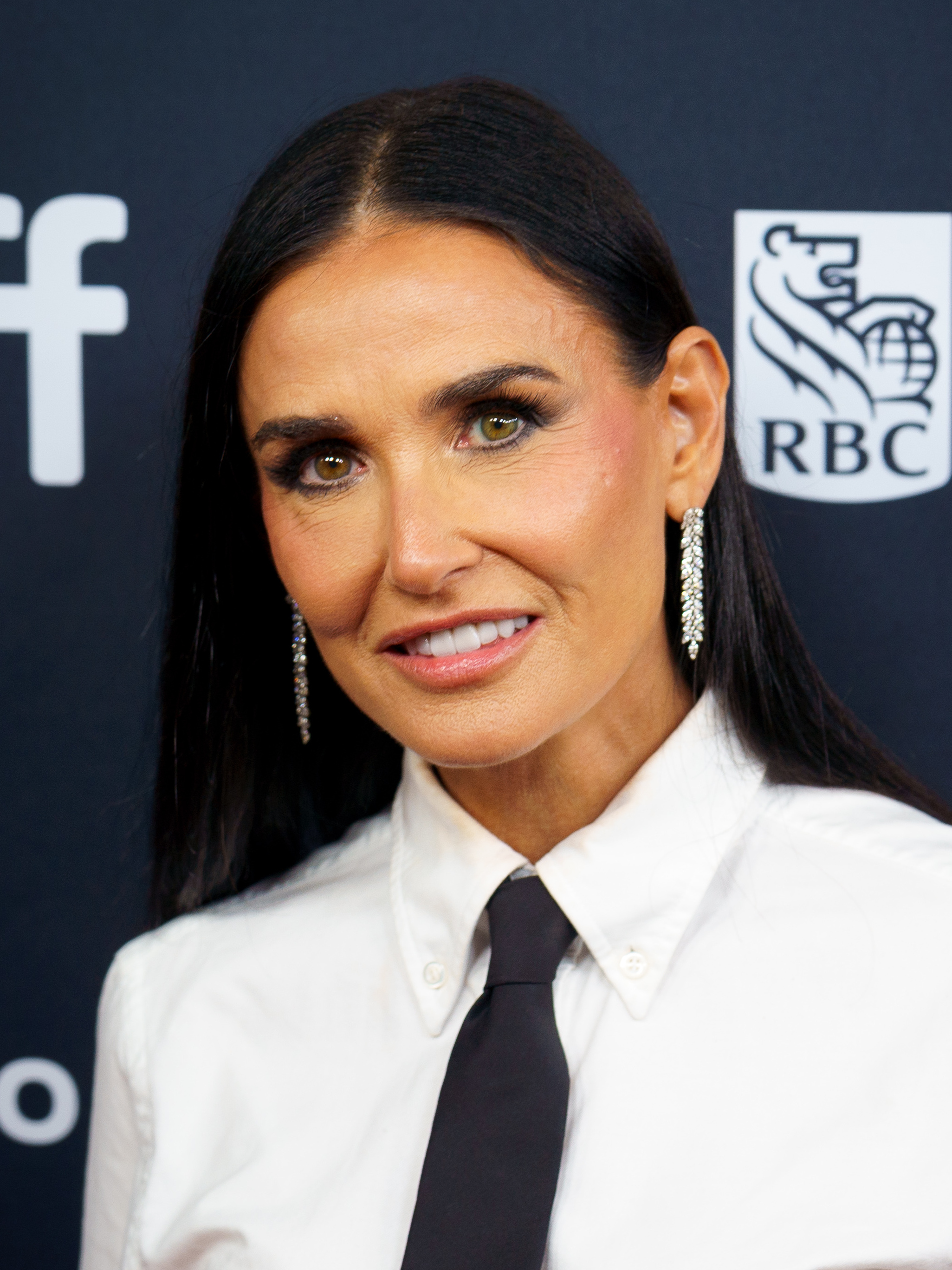
Demi Moore won for The Substance (2024)

Table key
| | Indicates the winner |
| ‡ | Indicates the Academy Award winner |

=== 1990s ===
| Year | Actress | Film | Role(s) | Ref. |
|---|---|---|---|---|
| 1994 (1st) | Jodie Foster | Nell | Nell Kellty | |
| 1994 (1st) | Jessica Lange ‡ | Blue Sky | Carly Marshall | |
| 1994 (1st) | Meg Ryan | When a Man Loves a Woman | Alice Green | |
| 1994 (1st) | Susan Sarandon | The Client | Reggie Love | |
| 1994 (1st) | Meryl Streep | The River Wild | Gail Hartman | |
| 1995 (2nd) | Susan Sarandon ‡ | Dead Man Walking | Sister Helen Prejean | |
| 1995 (2nd) | Joan Allen | Nixon | Pat Nixon | |
| 1995 (2nd) | Elisabeth Shue | Leaving Las Vegas | Sera | |
| 1995 (2nd) | Meryl Streep | The Bridges of Madison County | Francesca Johnson | |
| 1995 (2nd) | Emma Thompson | Sense and Sensibility | Elinor Dashwood | |
| 1996 (3rd) | Frances McDormand ‡ | Fargo | Marge Gunderson | |
| 1996 (3rd) | Brenda Blethyn | Secrets & Lies | Cynthia Rose Purley | |
| 1996 (3rd) | Diane Keaton | Marvin's Room | Bessie | |
| 1996 (3rd) | Gena Rowlands | Unhook the Stars | Mildred Hawks | |
| 1996 (3rd) | Kristin Scott Thomas | The English Patient | Katharine Clifton | |
| 1997 (4th) | Helen Hunt ‡ | As Good as It Gets | Carol Connelly | |
| 1997 (4th) | Helena Bonham Carter | The Wings of the Dove | Kate Croy | |
| 1997 (4th) | Judi Dench | Mrs Brown | Queen Victoria | |
| 1997 (4th) | Pam Grier | Jackie Brown | Jackie Brown | |
| 1997 (4th) | Kate Winslet | Titanic | Rose DeWitt Bukater | |
| 1997 (4th) | Robin Wright | She's So Lovely | Maureen Murphy Quinn | |
| 1998 (5th) | Gwyneth Paltrow ‡ | Shakespeare in Love | Viola de Lesseps | |
| 1998 (5th) | Cate Blanchett | Elizabeth | Queen Elizabeth I | |
| 1998 (5th) | Jane Horrocks | Little Voice | LV | |
| 1998 (5th) | Meryl Streep | One True Thing | Kate Gulden | |
| 1998 (5th) | Emily Watson | Hilary and Jackie | Jacqueline du Pré | |
| 1999 (6th) | Annette Bening | American Beauty | Carolyn Burnham | |
| 1999 (6th) | Janet McTeer | Tumbleweeds | Mary Jo Walker | |
| 1999 (6th) | Julianne Moore | The End of the Affair | Sarah Miles | |
| 1999 (6th) | Meryl Streep | Music of the Heart | Roberta Guaspari | |
| 1999 (6th) | Hilary Swank ‡ | Boys Don't Cry | Brandon Teena | |

=== 2000s ===
| Year | Actress | Film | Role(s) | Ref. |
|---|---|---|---|---|
| 2000 (7th) | Julia Roberts ‡ | Erin Brockovich | Erin Brockovich | |
| 2000 (7th) | Joan Allen | The Contender | Laine Hanson | |
| 2000 (7th) | Juliette Binoche | Chocolat | Vianne Liberato | |
| 2000 (7th) | Ellen Burstyn | Requiem for a Dream | Sara Goldfarb | |
| 2000 (7th) | Laura Linney | You Can Count on Me | Sammy Taylor | |
| 2001 (8th) | Halle Berry ‡ | Monster's Ball | Leticia Musgrove | |
| 2001 (8th) | Jennifer Connelly ‡ won Academy Award for Best Supporting Actress | A Beautiful Mind | Alicia Nash | |
| 2001 (8th) | Judi Dench | Iris | Iris Murdoch | |
| 2001 (8th) | Sissy Spacek | In the Bedroom | Ruth Fowler | |
| 2001 (8th) | Renée Zellweger | Bridget Jones's Diary | Bridget Jones | |
| 2002 (9th) | Renée Zellweger | Chicago | Roxie Hart | |
| 2002 (9th) | Salma Hayek | Frida | Frida Kahlo | |
| 2002 (9th) | Nicole Kidman ‡ | The Hours | Virginia Woolf | |
| 2002 (9th) | Diane Lane | Unfaithful | Connie Sumner | |
| 2002 (9th) | Julianne Moore | Far from Heaven | Cathy Whitaker | |
| 2003 (10th) | Charlize Theron ‡ | Monster | Aileen Wuornos | |
| 2003 (10th) | Patricia Clarkson | The Station Agent | Olivia Harris | |
| 2003 (10th) | Diane Keaton | Something's Gotta Give | Erica Barry | |
| 2003 (10th) | Naomi Watts | 21 Grams | Cristina Gallagher | |
| 2003 (10th) | Evan Rachel Wood | Thirteen | Tracy Freeland | |
| 2004 (11th) | Hilary Swank ‡ | Million Dollar Baby | Maggie Fitzgerald | |
| 2004 (11th) | Annette Bening | Being Julia | Julia Lambert | |
| 2004 (11th) | Catalina Sandino Moreno | Maria Full of Grace | Maria Álvarez | |
| 2004 (11th) | Imelda Staunton | Vera Drake | Vera Drake | |
| 2004 (11th) | Kate Winslet | Eternal Sunshine of the Spotless Mind | Clemetine Kruczynski | |
| 2005 (12th) | Reese Witherspoon ‡ | Walk the Line | June Carter Cash | |
| 2005 (12th) | Judi Dench | Mrs Henderson Presents | Laura Henderson | |
| 2005 (12th) | Felicity Huffman | Transamerica | Bree Hoffman | |
| 2005 (12th) | Charlize Theron | North Country | Josey Aimes | |
| 2005 (12th) | Ziyi Zhang | Memoirs of a Geisha | Sayuri Takanasja | |
| 2006 (13th) | Helen Mirren ‡ | The Queen | Queen Elizabeth II | |
| 2006 (13th) | Penélope Cruz | Volver | Raimunda | |
| 2006 (13th) | Judi Dench | Notes on a Scandal | Barbara Covett | |
| 2006 (13th) | Meryl Streep | The Devil Wears Prada | Miranda Priestly | |
| 2006 (13th) | Kate Winslet | Little Children | Sarah Pierce | |
| 2007 (14th) | Julie Christie | Away from Her | Fiona Anderson | |
| 2007 (14th) | Cate Blanchett | Elizabeth: The Golden Age | Queen Elizabeth I | |
| 2007 (14th) | Marion Cotillard ‡ | La Vie en Rose | Édith Piaf | |
| 2007 (14th) | Angelina Jolie | A Mighty Heart | Mariane Pearl | |
| 2007 (14th) | Elliot Page | Juno | Juno MacGuff | |
| 2008 (15th) | Meryl Streep | Doubt | Sister Aloysius Beauvier | |
| 2008 (15th) | Anne Hathaway | Rachel Getting Married | Kym Ryder | |
| 2008 (15th) | Angelina Jolie | Changeling | Christine Collins | |
| 2008 (15th) | Melissa Leo | Frozen River | Ray Eddy | |
| 2008 (15th) | Kate Winslet | Revolutionary Road | April Wheeler | |
| 2009 (16th) | Sandra Bullock ‡ | The Blind Side | Leigh Anne Tuohy | |
| 2009 (16th) | Helen Mirren | The Last Station | Sophia Tolstaya | |
| 2009 (16th) | Carey Mulligan | An Education | Jenny Mellor | |
| 2009 (16th) | Gabourey Sidibe | Precious | Precious Jones | |
| 2009 (16th) | Meryl Streep | Julie & Julia | Julia Child | |

=== 2010s ===
| Year | Actress | Film | Role(s) | Ref. |
|---|---|---|---|---|
| 2010 (17th) | Natalie Portman ‡ | Black Swan | Nina Sayers | |
| 2010 (17th) | Annette Bening | The Kids Are All Right | Dr. Nicole "Nic" Allgood | |
| 2010 (17th) | Nicole Kidman | Rabbit Hole | Becca Corbett | |
| 2010 (17th) | Jennifer Lawrence | Winter's Bone | Ree Dolly | |
| 2010 (17th) | Hilary Swank | Conviction | Betty Anne Waters | |
| 2011 (18th) | Viola Davis | The Help | Aibileen Clark | |
| 2011 (18th) | Glenn Close | Albert Nobbs | Albert Nobbs | |
| 2011 (18th) | Meryl Streep ‡ | The Iron Lady | Margaret Thatcher | |
| 2011 (18th) | Tilda Swinton | We Need to Talk About Kevin | Eva Khatchadourian | |
| 2011 (18th) | Michelle Williams | My Week with Marilyn | Marilyn Monroe | |
| 2012 (19th) | Jennifer Lawrence ‡ | Silver Linings Playbook | Tiffany Maxwell | |
| 2012 (19th) | Jessica Chastain | Zero Dark Thirty | Maya Harris | |
| 2012 (19th) | Marion Cotillard | Rust and Bone | Stéphanie | |
| 2012 (19th) | Helen Mirren | Hitchcock | Alma Reville | |
| 2012 (19th) | Naomi Watts | The Impossible | Maria Bennett | |
| 2013 (20th) | Cate Blanchett ‡ | Blue Jasmine | Jeanette "Jasmine" Francis | |
| 2013 (20th) | Sandra Bullock | Gravity | Dr. Ryan Stone | |
| 2013 (20th) | Judi Dench | Philomena | Philomena Lee | |
| 2013 (20th) | Meryl Streep | August: Osage County | Violet Weston | |
| 2013 (20th) | Emma Thompson | Saving Mr. Banks | P. L. Travers | |
| 2014 (21st) | Julianne Moore ‡ | Still Alice | Dr. Alice Howland | |
| 2014 (21st) | Jennifer Aniston | Cake | Claire Bennett | |
| 2014 (21st) | Felicity Jones | The Theory of Everything | Jane Wilde Hawking | |
| 2014 (21st) | Rosamund Pike | Gone Girl | Amy Elliott-Dunne | |
| 2014 (21st) | Reese Witherspoon | Wild | Cheryl Strayed | |
| 2015 (22nd) | Brie Larson ‡ | Room | Joy "Ma" Newsome | |
| 2015 (22nd) | Cate Blanchett | Carol | Carol Aird | |
| 2015 (22nd) | Helen Mirren | Woman in Gold | Maria Altmann | |
| 2015 (22nd) | Saoirse Ronan | Brooklyn | Eilis Lacey | |
| 2015 (22nd) | Sarah Silverman | I Smile Back | Elaine "Laney" Brooks | |
| 2016 (23rd) | Emma Stone ‡ | La La Land | Mia Dolan | |
| 2016 (23rd) | Amy Adams | Arrival | Dr. Louise Banks | |
| 2016 (23rd) | Emily Blunt | The Girl on the Train | Rachel Watson | |
| 2016 (23rd) | Natalie Portman | Jackie | Jackie Kennedy | |
| 2016 (23rd) | Meryl Streep | Florence Foster Jenkins | Florence Foster Jenkins | |
| 2017 (24th) | Frances McDormand ‡ | Three Billboards Outside Ebbing, Missouri | Mildred Hayes | |
| 2017 (24th) | Judi Dench | Victoria & Abdul | Queen Victoria | |
| 2017 (24th) | Sally Hawkins | The Shape of Water | Elisa Esposito | |
| 2017 (24th) | Margot Robbie | I, Tonya | Tonya Harding | |
| 2017 (24th) | Saoirse Ronan | Lady Bird | Christine "Lady Bird" McPherson | |
| 2018 (25th) | Glenn Close | The Wife | Joan Castleman | |
| 2018 (25th) | Emily Blunt | Mary Poppins Returns | Mary Poppins | |
| 2018 (25th) | Olivia Colman ‡ | The Favourite | Queen Anne | |
| 2018 (25th) | Lady Gaga | A Star Is Born | Ally Maine | |
| 2018 (25th) | Melissa McCarthy | Can You Ever Forgive Me? | Lee Israel | |
| 2019 (26th) | Renée Zellweger ‡ | Judy | Judy Garland | |
| 2019 (26th) | Cynthia Erivo | Harriet | Harriet Tubman | |
| 2019 (26th) | Scarlett Johansson | Marriage Story | Nicole Barber | |
| 2019 (26th) | Lupita Nyong'o | Us | Adelaide Wilson / Red | |
| 2019 (26th) | Charlize Theron | Bombshell | Megyn Kelly | |

=== 2020s ===
| Year | Actress | Film | Role(s) | Ref. |
|---|---|---|---|---|
| 2020 (27th) | Viola Davis | Ma Rainey's Black Bottom | Ma Rainey | |
| 2020 (27th) | Amy Adams | Hillbilly Elegy | Beverly "Bev" Vance | |
| 2020 (27th) | Vanessa Kirby | Pieces of a Woman | Martha Weiss | |
| 2020 (27th) | Frances McDormand ‡ | Nomadland | Fern | |
| 2020 (27th) | Carey Mulligan | Promising Young Woman | Cassandra "Cassie" Thomas | |
| 2021 (28th) | Jessica Chastain ‡ | The Eyes of Tammy Faye | Tammy Faye Bakker | |
| 2021 (28th) | Olivia Colman | The Lost Daughter | Leda Caruso | |
| 2021 (28th) | Jennifer Hudson | Respect | Aretha Franklin | |
| 2021 (28th) | Lady Gaga | House of Gucci | Patrizia Reggiani | |
| 2021 (28th) | Nicole Kidman | Being the Ricardos | Lucille Ball | |
| 2022 (29th) | Michelle Yeoh ‡ | Everything Everywhere All at Once | Evelyn Quan Wang | |
| 2022 (29th) | Cate Blanchett | Tár | Lydia Tár | |
| 2022 (29th) | Viola Davis | The Woman King | General Nanisca | |
| 2022 (29th) | Ana de Armas | Blonde | Norma Jeane Mortenson / Marilyn Monroe | |
| 2022 (29th) | Danielle Deadwyler | Till | Mamie Till | |
| 2023 (30th) | Lily Gladstone | Killers of the Flower Moon | Mollie Burkhart | |
| 2023 (30th) | Annette Bening | Nyad | Diana Nyad | |
| 2023 (30th) | Carey Mulligan | Maestro | Felicia Montealegre | |
| 2023 (30th) | Margot Robbie | Barbie | Barbie | |
| 2023 (30th) | Emma Stone ‡ | Poor Things | Bella Baxter | |
| 2024 (31st) | Demi Moore | The Substance | Elisabeth Sparkle | |
| 2024 (31st) | Pamela Anderson | The Last Showgirl | Shelly Gardner | |
| 2024 (31st) | Cynthia Erivo | Wicked | Elphaba Thropp | |
| 2024 (31st) | Karla Sofía Gascón | Emilia Pérez | Emilia Pérez / Juan "Manitas" Del Monte | |
| 2024 (31st) | Mikey Madison ‡ | Anora | Anora "Ani" Mikheeva | |
| 2025 (32nd) | Jessie Buckley ‡ | Hamnet | Agnes Shakespeare | |
| 2025 (32nd) | Rose Byrne | If I Had Legs I'd Kick You | Linda | |
| 2025 (32nd) | Kate Hudson | Song Sung Blue | Claire Sardina | |
| 2025 (32nd) | Chase Infiniti | One Battle After Another | Willa Ferguson | |
| 2025 (32nd) | Emma Stone | Bugonia | Michelle Fuller | |

== Superlatives ==
| Superlative | Leading Actress | | Supporting Actress | | Overall | |
|---|---|---|---|---|---|---|
| Actress with most awards | Viola Davis, Frances McDormand, Renée Zellweger | 2 | Kate Winslet | 2 | Viola Davis, Renée Zellweger | 3 |
| Actress with most nominations | Meryl Streep | 10 | Cate Blanchett | 5 | Meryl Streep | 11 |
| Actress with most nominations without ever winning | Judi Dench | 6 | Amy Adams | 4 | Amy Adams, Nicole Kidman | 6 |
| Film with most nominations | — | | Almost Famous, Babel, Being John Malkovich, Bombshell, Chicago, Doubt, Everything Everywhere All at Once, The Favourite, The Fighter, Forrest Gump, The Help, Up in the Air | 2 | Bombshell, Chicago, Doubt, Everything Everywhere All at Once, The Favourite,The Help | 3 |
| Oldest winner | Glenn Close (The Wife, 2019) | 71 | Gloria Stuart (Titanic, 1998) | 87 | Gloria Stuart (Titanic, 1998) | 87 |
| Oldest nominee | Judi Dench (Victoria & Abdul, 2018) | 83 | Gloria Stuart (Titanic, 1998) | 87 | Gloria Stuart (Titanic, 1998) | 87 |
| Youngest winner | Jennifer Lawrence (Silver Linings Playbook, 2013) | 22 | Kate Winslet (Sense and Sensibility, 1996) | 20 | Kate Winslet (Sense and Sensibility, 1996) | 20 |
| Youngest nominee | Evan Rachel Wood (Thirteen, 2004) | 16 | Dakota Fanning (I Am Sam, 2002) | 7 | Dakota Fanning (I Am Sam, 2002) | 7 |

== Multiple winners ==
2 wins

- Viola Davis (The Help (2011), Ma Rainey's Black Bottom (2020))
- Frances McDormand (Fargo (1996), Three Billboards Outside Ebbing, Missouri (2017))
- Renée Zellweger (Chicago (2002), Judy (2019))

== Multiple nominees ==
Note: Winners are indicated in bold type.

Two nominations

- Amy Adams (Arrival (2016), Hillbilly Elegy (2020))
- Joan Allen (Nixon (1995), The Contender (2000))
- Emily Blunt (The Girl On The Train (2016), Mary Poppins Returns (2018))
- Sandra Bullock (**The Blind Side** (2009), Gravity (2013))
- Jessica Chastain (Zero Dark Thirty (2012), **The Eyes of Tammy Faye** (2021))
- Glenn Close (Albert Nobbs (2011), **The Wife** (2018))
- Olivia Colman (The Favourite (2018), The Lost Daughter (2021))
- Marion Cotillard (La Vie en Rose (2007), Rust and Bone (2012))
- Cynthia Erivo (Harriet (2019), Wicked (2024))
- Angelina Jolie (A Mighty Heart (2007), Changeling (2008))
- Diane Keaton (Marvin's Room (1996), Something's Gotta Give (2003))
- Lady Gaga (A Star is Born (2018), House of Gucci (2021))
- Jennifer Lawrence (Winter's Bone (2010), **Silver Linings Playbook** (2012))
- Natalie Portman (**Black Swan** (2010), Jackie (2016))
- Margot Robbie (I, Tonya (2017), Barbie (2023))
- Saoirse Ronan (Brooklyn (2015), Lady Bird (2017))
- Susan Sarandon (The Client (1994), **Dead Man Walking** (1995))
- Emma Thompson (Sense and Sensibility (1995), Saving Mr. Banks (2013))
- Naomi Watts (21 Grams (2003), The Impossible (2012))
- Reese Witherspoon (**Walk the Line** (2005), Wild (2014))

Three nominations

- Viola Davis (**The Help** (2011), **Ma Rainey's Black Bottom** (2020), The Woman King (2022))
- Nicole Kidman (The Hours (2002), Rabbit Hole (2010), Being the Ricardos (2021))
- Frances McDormand (**Fargo** (1996), **Three Billboards Outside Ebbing, Missouri** (2017), Nomadland (2020))
- Julianne Moore (The End of the Affair (1999), Far from Heaven (2002), **Still Alice** (2014))
- Carey Mulligan (An Education (2009), Promising Young Woman (2020), Maestro (2023))
- Emma Stone (**La La Land** (2016), Poor Things (2023), Bugonia (2025))
- Hilary Swank (Boys Don't Cry (1999), **Million Dollar Baby** (2004), Conviction (2010))
- Charlize Theron (**Monster** (2003), North Country (2005), Bombshell (2019))
- Renée Zellweger (Bridget Jones's Diary (2001), **Chicago** (2002), **Judy** (2019))

Four nominations

- Annette Bening (**American Beauty** (1999), Being Julia (2004), The Kids Are All Right (2010), Nyad (2023))
- Helen Mirren (**The Queen** (2006), The Last Station (2009), Hitchcock (2012), Woman in Gold (2015))
- Kate Winslet (Titanic (1997), Eternal Sunshine of the Spotless Mind (2004), Little Children (2006), Revolutionary Road (2008))

Five nominations

- Cate Blanchett (Elizabeth (1998), Elizabeth: The Golden Age (2007), **Blue Jasmine** (2013), Carol (2015), Tár (2022))

Six nominations

- Judi Dench (Mrs Brown (1997), Iris (2001), Mrs Henderson Presents (2005), Notes on a Scandal (2006), Philomena (2013), Victoria & Abdul (2017))

Ten nominations

- Meryl Streep (The River Wild (1994), The Bridges of Madison County (1995), One True Thing (1998), Music of the Heart (1999), The Devil Wears Prada (2006), **Doubt** (2008), Julie & Julia (2009), The Iron Lady (2011), August: Osage County (2013), Florence Foster Jenkins (2016))

== See also ==
- Academy Award for Best Actress
- BAFTA Award for Best Actress in a Leading Role
- Critics' Choice Movie Award for Best Actress
- Independent Spirit Award for Best Female Lead
- Golden Globe Award for Best Actress in a Motion Picture – Drama
- Golden Globe Award for Best Actress in a Motion Picture – Musical or Comedy
