= AACTA International Award for Best Actress =

Australian film award

Best International Actress AACTA Award
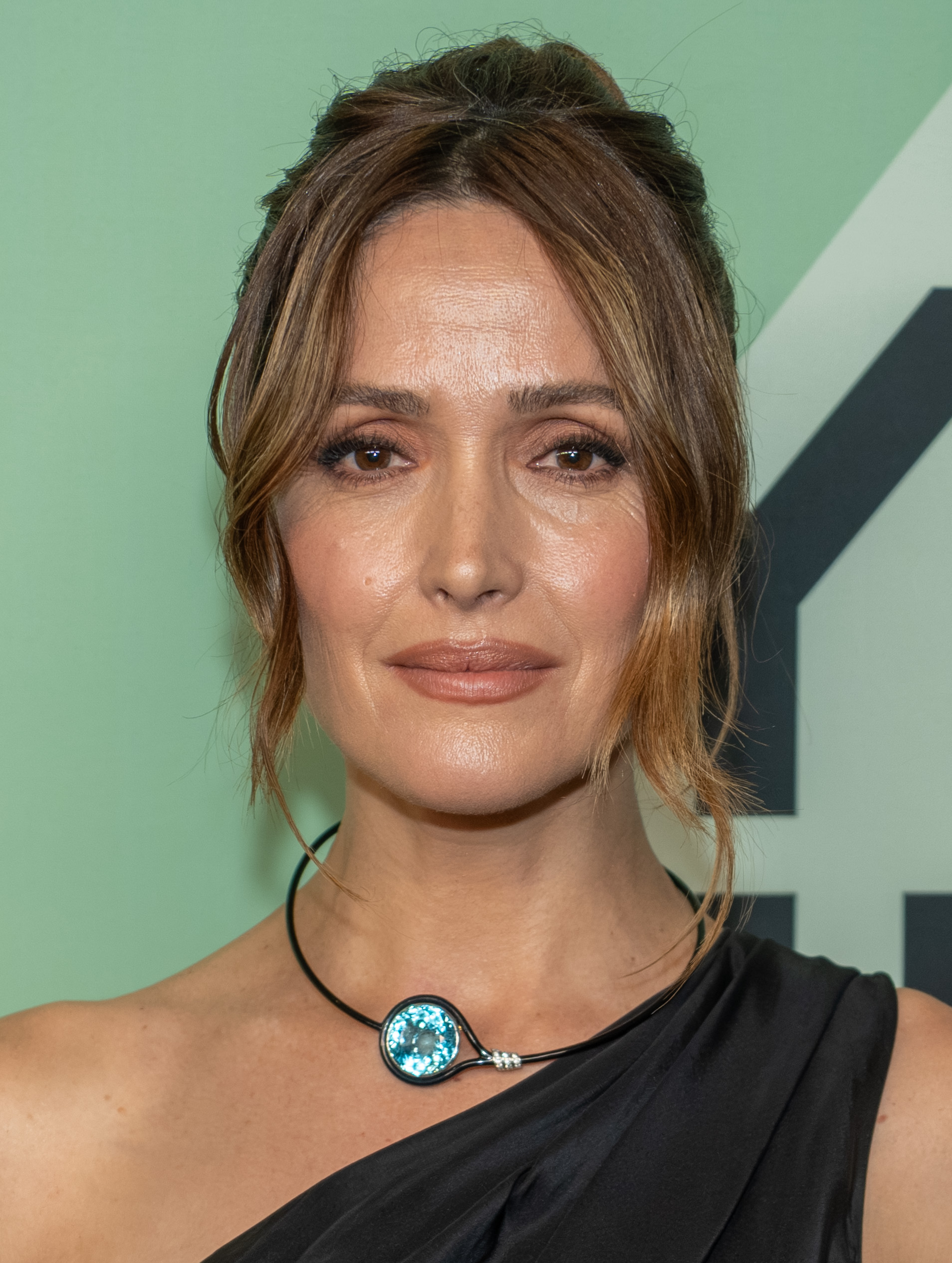
- Current recipient: Rose Byrne
- Country: Australia
- Presented by: Australian Academy of Cinema and Television Arts (AACTA)
- First award: 2012
- Currently held by: Rose Byrne, If I Had Legs I'd Kick You (2025)
- Website: https://www.aacta.org

The AACTA International Award for Best Lead Actress is an award that is presented by the Australian Academy of Cinema and Television Arts (AACTA), for a performance by a female actor in a film made outside Australia. It was first handed out by the Academy after its establishment in 2011 by the Australian Film Institute (AFI). The winners and nominees for 2011 were determined by a jury. The award was presented at the inaugural AACTA International Awards in Los Angeles, on 27 January 2012.

== Winners and nominees ==
In the following table, the winner is listed first, marked in a separate colour, and highlighted in boldface; the nominees are those that are listed below the winner, and not highlighted or in boldface.

- † - indicates a winner of the Academy Award for Best Actress
- ‡ - indicates a nominee for the Academy Award for Best Actress

=== 2010s ===
Year	Actress	Film	Role
**2011** (1st)
**2011** (1st)	**Meryl Streep** †	**The Iron Lady**	**Margaret Thatcher**
**2011** (1st)	Glenn Close ‡	Albert Nobbs	Albert Nobbs
**2011** (1st)	Kirsten Dunst	Melancholia	Justine
**2011** (1st)	Tilda Swinton	We Need to Talk About Kevin	Eva Khatchadourian
**2011** (1st)	Mia Wasikowska	Jane Eyre	Jane Eyre
**2011** (1st)	Michelle Williams ‡	My Week with Marilyn	Marilyn Monroe
**2012** (2nd)
**2012** (2nd)	**Jennifer Lawrence** †	**Silver Linings Playbook**	**Tiffany Maxwell**
**2012** (2nd)	Jessica Chastain ‡	Zero Dark Thirty	Maya
**2012** (2nd)	Marion Cotillard	Rust and Bone	Stephanie
**2012** (2nd)	Nicole Kidman	The Paperboy	Charlotte Bless
**2012** (2nd)	Emmanuelle Riva ‡	Amour	Anne Laurent
**2012** (2nd)	Naomi Watts ‡	The Impossible	Maria Bennett
**2013** (3rd)
**2013** (3rd)	**Cate Blanchett** †	**Blue Jasmine**	**Jeanette "Jasmine" Francis**
**2013** (3rd)	Amy Adams ‡	American Hustle	Sydney Prosser
**2013** (3rd)	Sandra Bullock ‡	Gravity	Dr. Ryan Stone
**2013** (3rd)	Judi Dench ‡	Philomena	Philomena Lee
**2013** (3rd)	Meryl Streep ‡	August: Osage County	Violet Weston
**2014** (4th)
**2014** (4th)	**Julianne Moore** †	**Still Alice**	**Alice Howland**
**2014** (4th)	Essie Davis	The Babadook	Amelia
**2014** (4th)	Felicity Jones ‡	The Theory of Everything	Jane Wilde Hawking
**2014** (4th)	Rosamund Pike ‡	Gone Girl	Amy Elliott-Dunne
**2014** (4th)	Reese Witherspoon ‡	Wild	Cheryl Strayed
**2015** (5th)
**2015** (5th)	**Cate Blanchett** ‡	**Carol**	**Carol Aird**
**2015** (5th)	Emily Blunt	Sicario	Kate Macer
**2015** (5th)	Brie Larson †	Room	Joy "Ma" Newsome
**2015** (5th)	Saoirse Ronan ‡	Brooklyn	Eilis Lacey
**2015** (5th)	Charlize Theron	Mad Max: Fury Road	Imperator Furiosa
**2016** (6th)
**2016** (6th)	**Emma Stone** †	**La La Land**	**Mia Dolan**
**2016** (6th)	Amy Adams	Arrival	Dr. Louise Banks
**2016** (6th)	Isabelle Huppert ‡	Elle	Michèle Leblanc
**2016** (6th)	Ruth Negga ‡	Loving	Mildred Loving
**2016** (6th)	Natalie Portman ‡	Jackie	Jackie Kennedy
**2017** (7th)
**2017** (7th)	**Margot Robbie** ‡	**I, Tonya**	**Tonya Harding**
**2017** (7th)	Judi Dench	Victoria & Abdul	Queen Victoria
**2017** (7th)	Sally Hawkins ‡	The Shape of Water	Elisa Esposito
**2017** (7th)	Frances McDormand †	Three Billboards Outside Ebbing, Missouri	Mildred Hayes
**2017** (7th)	Saoirse Ronan ‡	Lady Bird	Christine "Lady Bird" McPherson
**2018** (8th)
**2018** (8th)	**Olivia Colman** †	**The Favourite**	**Queen Anne**
**2018** (8th)	Glenn Close ‡	The Wife	Joan Castleman
**2018** (8th)	Toni Collette	Hereditary	Annie Graham
**2018** (8th)	Lady Gaga ‡	A Star Is Born	Ally Maine
**2018** (8th)	Nicole Kidman	Destroyer	Erin Bell
**2019** (9th)
**2019** (9th)	**Saoirse Ronan** ‡	**Little Women**	**Josephine "Jo" March**
**2019** (9th)	Awkwafina	The Farewell	Billi Wang
**2019** (9th)	Scarlett Johansson ‡	Marriage Story	Nicole Barber
**2019** (9th)	Charlize Theron ‡	Bombshell	Megyn Kelly
**2019** (9th)	Renée Zellweger †	Judy	Judy Garland

=== 2020s ===
Year	Actress	Film	Role
**2020** (10th)
**2020** (10th)	**Carey Mulligan** ‡	**Promising Young Woman**	**Cassandra "Cassie" Thomas**
**2020** (10th)	Viola Davis ‡	Ma Rainey's Black Bottom	Ma Rainey
**2020** (10th)	Vanessa Kirby ‡	Pieces of a Woman	Martha Weiss
**2020** (10th)	Frances McDormand †	Nomadland	Fern
**2020** (10th)	Eliza Scanlen	Babyteeth	Milla Finlay
**2021** (11th)
**2021** (11th)	**Nicole Kidman** ‡	**Being the Ricardos**	**Lucille Ball**
**2021** (11th)	Penélope Cruz ‡	Parallel Mothers	Janis Martinez
**2021** (11th)	Lady Gaga	House of Gucci	Patrizia Reggiani
**2021** (11th)	Jennifer Hudson	Respect	Aretha Franklin
**2021** (11th)	Kristen Stewart ‡	Spencer	Princess Diana
**2022** (12th)
**2022** (12th)	**Cate Blanchett** ‡	**Tár**	**Lydia Tár**
**2022** (12th)	Ana de Armas ‡	Blonde	Norma Jeane Mortenson / Marilyn Monroe
**2022** (12th)	Margot Robbie	Babylon	Nellie LaRoy
**2022** (12th)	Michelle Williams ‡	The Fabelmans	Mitzi Fabelman
**2022** (12th)	Michelle Yeoh †	Everything Everywhere All at Once	Evelyn Wang
**2023** (13th)
**2023** (13th)	**Margot Robbie**	**Barbie**	**Barbie**
**2023** (13th)	Cate Blanchett	The New Boy	Sister Eileen
**2023** (13th)	Lily Gladstone ‡	Killers of the Flower Moon	Mollie Kyle
**2023** (13th)	Carey Mulligan ‡	Maestro	Felicia Montealegre
**2023** (13th)	Emma Stone †	Poor Things	Bella Baxter
**2024** (14th)
**2024** (14th)	**Nicole Kidman**	**Babygirl**	**Romy Mathis**
**2024** (14th)	Kirsten Dunst	Civil War	Lee Smith
**2024** (14th)	Karla Sofía Gascón ‡	Emilia Pérez	Emilia Pérez
**2024** (14th)	Mikey Madison †	Anora	Anora "Ani" Mikheeva
**2024** (14th)	Kate Winslet	Lee	Lee Miller
**2025** (15th)
**2025** (15th)	**Rose Byrne** ‡	**If I Had Legs I'd Kick You**	**Linda**
**2025** (15th)	Jessie Buckley †	Hamnet	Agnes Shakespeare
**2025** (15th)	Kate Hudson ‡	Song Sung Blue	Claire Sardina
**2025** (15th)	Chase Infiniti	One Battle After Another	Willa Ferguson
**2025** (15th)	Renate Reinsve ‡	Sentimental Value	Nora Borg

== Multiple wins and nominations ==
The following individuals received two or more Best Actress awards:

Wins	Actress
3	Cate Blanchett
2	Nicole Kidman
2	Margot Robbie

The following individuals received two or more Best Actress nominations:

Nominations	Actress
4	Cate Blanchett
4	Nicole Kidman
3	Saoirse Ronan
3	Margot Robbie
2	Amy Adams
2	Glenn Close
2	Judi Dench
2	Kirsten Dunst
2	Lady Gaga
2	Frances McDormand
2	Carey Mulligan
2	Emma Stone
2	Meryl Streep
2	Charlize Theron
2	Michelle Williams

== See also ==
- AACTA Award for Best Actress in a Leading Role
- AACTA Awards
