= 6th AACTA International Awards =

Annual Australian film awards

- Date: 6 January 2017 (ceremony date); 8 January 2017 (broadcast date)
- Site: The Avalon; Los Angeles
- Hosted by: Daniel MacPherson

Highlights
- Best Film: La La Land
- Most awards: La La Land, Lion, and Manchester by the Sea (2)
- Most nominations: Hacksaw Ridge, La La Land, and Lion (7)

Television coverage
- Network: Foxtel Arts

The 6th Australian Academy of Cinema and Television Arts International Awards (commonly known as the AACTA International Awards were presented by the Australian Academy of Cinema and Television Arts (AACTA), a non-profit organisation whose aim is to identify, award, promote and celebrate Australia's greatest achievements in film and television. Awards were handed out for the best films of 2016 regardless of the country of origin as the international counterpart to the awards for Australian films.

The awards were presented on 6 January 2017 at The Avalon in Hollywood, Los Angeles with Australian actor Daniel MacPherson hosting the event. The ceremony was broadcast on Foxtel Arts in Australia on 8 January. The nominees were announced on 13 December 2016 with Hacksaw Ridge, La La Land and Lion receiving nominations in all seven categories.

== Nominees ==
Best Film: La La Land; Arrival; Hacksaw Ridge; Lion; Manchester by the Sea	Best Direction: Mel Gibson – Hacksaw Ridge; Denis Villeneuve – Arrival; Damien Chazelle – La La Land; Garth Davis – Lion; Kenneth Lonergan – Manchester by the Sea
Best Actor: Casey Affleck – Manchester by the Sea; Joel Edgerton – Loving; Andrew Garfield – Hacksaw Ridge; Ryan Gosling – La La Land; Denzel Washington – Fences	Best Actress: Emma Stone – La La Land; Amy Adams – Arrival; Isabelle Huppert – Elle; Ruth Negga – Loving; Natalie Portman – Jackie
Best Supporting Actor: Dev Patel – Lion; Mahershala Ali – Moonlight; Jeff Bridges – Hell or High Water; Lucas Hedges – Manchester by the Sea; Michael Shannon – Nocturnal Animals	Best Supporting Actress: Nicole Kidman – Lion; Viola Davis – Fences; Naomie Harris – Moonlight; Teresa Palmer – Hacksaw Ridge; Michelle Williams – Manchester by the Sea
Best Screenplay: Manchester by the Sea – Kenneth Lonergan; Hacksaw Ridge – Andrew Knight and Robert Schenkkan; Hell or High Water – Taylor Sheridan; La La Land – Damien Chazelle; Lion – Luke Davies

== See also ==
- 23rd Screen Actors Guild Awards
- 22nd Critics' Choice Awards
- 70th British Academy Film Awards
- 74th Golden Globe Awards
- 89th Academy Awards
