= Song Sung Blue (2008 film) =

2008 American biographical documentary film

- Directed by: Greg Kohs
- Written by: Greg Kohs
- Produced by: Greg Kohs; Andrea Mihalik
- Starring: Mike Sardina; Claire Sardina; Eddie Vedder
- Cinematography: Jimmy Sammarco
- Edited by: Billy Fox
- Music by: Tony Dekker
- Release date: January 23, 2008 (Slamdance Film Festival)
- Country: United States
- Language: English

Song Sung Blue is a 2008 American biographical musical documentary film written, co-produced, and directed by Greg Kohs. The film follows Mike and Claire Sardina, who performed as the Neil Diamond tribute band Lightning & Thunder, and documents their life events.

Song Sung Blue had its premiere at the Slamdance Film Festival on January 23, 2008 where it received the Jury and Audience Awards for Best Documentary. The film's premiere was postponed for several days while Kohs sought Diamond's approval to use his music in the film, a process aided by Eddie Vedder.

The film was dramatized in a 2025 feature of the same name, written and directed by Craig Brewer, starring Hugh Jackman and Kate Hudson. Brewer had first seen the documentary at the 2008 Indie Memphis Film Festival.
