= Mike Sardina =

American entertainer

- Born: Michael H. Sardina; March 22, 1951; Milwaukee, Wisconsin, U.S.
- Died: July 27, 2006 (aged 55)
- Occupation: Entertainer
- Years active: 1987–2006
- Spouse: Claire Sardina (m. 1994)
- Children: 2

Michael Henry "Lightning" Sardina (March 22, 1951 - July 27, 2006) was an American entertainer, known for his partnership with his wife Claire Sardina and their Neil Diamond tribute band, Lightning and Thunder. They have been the subjects of a 2008 documentary and a 2025 feature film, both titled Song Sung Blue.

== Early life and education ==
Mike Sardina was born in Milwaukee, Wisconsin, the son of Alice (née VanEnKenVort) and Anthony Sardina. He served in the Vietnam War and was a retired body shop manager. He gained the nickname "Lightning" while playing guitar for the Milwaukee R&B Group The Esquires in 1972.

== Lightning and Thunder ==
He met Claire Sardina in 1987 when she auditioned for his band. A romance later began and they decided to start a band together titled Lightning and Thunder. The pair performed in the Milwaukee and Chicago area throughout the 1980s and 1990s, often at state fairs, including the Wisconsin State Fair, music festivals like Summerfest, or as an opening act for major bands (including Pearl Jam), touring through the area. The band ended in 2006 after his death due to a head injury.

In 2025, the Wisconsin Area Music Industry Association (WAMI) awarded the band with a lifetime achievement award in recognition of "giving Wisconsin decades of music, heart, and inspiration".

== Discography ==
=== Albums ===
In 1996, Lightning and Thunder released a studio recording featuring four original songs, and six covers.

Year	Title	Formats
1996	Hold On: Clean Songs Thru The School of Hard Knocks	Enhanced CD/Download

== Portrayal in media ==
A documentary about his life was created and released in 2008 by Greg Kohs titled Song Sung Blue. A feature film about his life, based on the documentary, was released in 2025 by Focus Features, also titled Song Sung Blue. In the film, he was portrayed by Hugh Jackman.
