= Song Sung Blue (2025 film) =

2025 American biographical drama film

- Theatrical release poster
- Directed by: Craig Brewer
- Written by: Craig Brewer
- Based on: Song Sung Blue by Greg Kohs
- Produced by: John Davis; John Fox; Craig Brewer
- Starring: Hugh Jackman; Kate Hudson; Michael Imperioli; Ella Anderson; Mustafa Shakir; Fisher Stevens; Jim Belushi
- Cinematography: Amy Vincent
- Edited by: Billy Fox
- Music by: Scott Bomar
- Production company: Davis Entertainment
- Distributed by: Focus Features (United States); Universal Pictures (International)
- Release dates: October 26, 2025 (AFI Film Festival); December 25, 2025; (United States)
- Running time: 132 minutes
- Country: United States
- Language: English
- Budget: $30 million
- Box office: $58 million

Song Sung Blue is a 2025 American biographical musical drama film written, produced, and directed by Craig Brewer, based on the 2008 documentary film of the same name by Greg Kohs. The film stars Hugh Jackman and Kate Hudson as Mike and Claire Sardina, who performed as the Neil Diamond tribute band Lightning & Thunder.

Song Sung Blue had its premiere at the AFI Film Festival on October 26, 2025, and was released in the United States by Focus Features on December 25, with Universal Pictures releasing in other territories. The film received positive reviews from critics and grossed $58 million. Hudson's performance garnered particular praise, and earned her nominations for the Golden Globe Award, Actor Award, BAFTA Award, and the Academy Award for Best Actress.

== Plot ==
In 1987, musician Mike Sardina is hired to appear at the Wisconsin State Fair, filling in for a Don Ho impersonator who has undergone emergency surgery. After refusing to go on stage when the promoter stops him from performing his own material, he quits, just as Claire Stengl, a hairdresser by day and performer by night, is preparing to perform as Patsy Cline.

In 1988, Mike and Claire meet again as neighbors and have a conversation in which she suggests he go down "the Neil Diamond route." He watches her sing and is immediately smitten. Mike returns home and starts practicing. The two decide to perform together and later begin a romantic relationship.

After a misunderstanding about the target audience for their first gig, the show ends almost immediately in a brawl. Claire tells Mike he cannot be so stubborn about the band's future. He is upset about the failure, as he had the perfect night planned; in complaining about the night's ruination, he lets slip that he had planned to propose.

Claire accepts the proposal Mike did not really make, but gets him to agree to always open with "Sweet Caroline" in the future. They end up with a string of successful shows, even opening for Pearl Jam in 1995. On Mike's request, Eddie Vedder joins them for their opening number, singing "Forever In Blue Jeans" with them, helping them win over the crowd (and Mike wins over his stepdaughter, Rachel, who had not been too sure of him).

One day in 1999, Claire is hit by a car while planting flowers in the front garden of their house. She loses her left leg below the knee, and Mike suffers a stress-induced heart attack. Claire struggles with depression, pain, and addiction to pain medications in the aftermath. She begins fighting with Mike, thinking that he is seeing other people.

Seeing the tension and stress in Mike, his daughter Angelina asks if he has been attending his AA meetings. After a bit more prodding, he confesses that singing does not mean anything when Claire is not there to sing with him. Angelina insists he take his alcoholism more seriously, so he agrees to start attending meetings. After Claire suffers a psychotic episode and is found wandering outside their home, Mike places her in a mental hospital to recover.

Mike turns to blue-collar work to support Claire's hospitalization, while his stepdaughter Rachel reveals she is four months pregnant. She wants to give the baby to a couple who are having trouble conceiving, but has not found anyone willing to accept it. Mike takes a moment to ask who she needs to help her, and Rachel admits she needs her mom. Claire has a breakthrough and gradually regains the ability to walk and care for herself, returning home by Christmas and reconciling with Rachel.

Claire pushes for "Lightning and Thunder" to go on gigging again, to recapture their popularity. She helps Rachel through her pregnancy and the adoption, and spending time with her family helps Claire adapt to her new prosthetic leg. Eventually, the Ritz in Milwaukee invites them to be a headliner on the same night Neil Diamond is playing a sold-out show nearby. Mike and Claire agree to the gig, only to learn later that Diamond wants to meet them in person afterward.

While preparing for the gig, Mike experiences another heart attack and strikes his head on the sink. He recovers enough to perform, and the couple wishes each other good luck. Mike also tells Claire that none of this would be possible without her and that she is his everything.

The concert is a massive success, and they drive to a local frozen custard place to celebrate and meet Neil Diamond. Claire gets out of the car and is given the news that Neil is on his way; she leans back into the car to get Mike and finds that he has died. Rachel writes her father's eulogy, and Claire sings at his funeral.

Some time later, Claire's son Dana plays a recording of Mike singing "Song Sung Blue" as his mother finishes planting the flowers she started years ago.

== Cast ==
- Hugh Jackman as Mike Sardina a.k.a. "Lightning"
- Kate Hudson as Claire Cartwright-Sardina a.k.a. "Thunder"
- Michael Imperioli as Mark Shurilla, a Buddy Holly impersonator turned guitarist
- Ella Anderson as Rachel Cartwright, Claire's daughter from her first marriage
- King Princess as Angelina Sardina, Mike's daughter from his first marriage
- Mustafa Shakir as s*x Machine, a James Brown impersonator
- Hudson Hensley as Dana Cartwright, Claire's son from her first marriage
- John Beckwith as Eddie Vedder
- Fisher Stevens as Dave Watson
- Jim Belushi as Tom D’Amato, Lightning and Thunder's manager
- Jackie Cox as Babs, a drag queen and Claire's co-worker
- Cecelia Riddett as Grandma Stengl
- Sean Allan Krill as Buddy Holmes, a promoter
- Beth Malone as Bridget
- Jayson Warner Smith as Earl/TCB

== Production ==
In October 2024, it was announced that a musical drama film based on the 2008 documentary Song Sung Blue was in development at Focus Features with Craig Brewer writing, co-producing, and directing the film, with Hugh Jackman, Kate Hudson, Michael Imperioli, Fisher Stevens, Jim Belushi, Ella Anderson, King Princess, Mustafa Shakir, and Hudson Hilbert Hensley rounding out the main cast. Pop singer-songwriter Neil Diamond granted the rights to use his music in the film, as he had also done for the original documentary, in which he met Claire Sardina in real life.

Principal photography began on October 14, 2024, in Monmouth County, New Jersey. A house in Old Tappan, New Jersey was another significant film location. Filming wrapped on December 11. Amy Vincent was the cinematographer.

== Release ==
To promote the film, from October 3–4, 2025, Jackman and Hudson performed songs from the film live in a special concert presentation at Radio City Music Hall. Song Sung Blue had its world premiere at the AFI Film Festival on October 26, 2025. The film also screened at the Savannah Film Festival on October 30, 2025.

Jackman and filmmaker Craig Brewer traveled to Milwaukee, Wisconsin in December 2025 to further promote the film. Kopp's Frozen Custard released a flavor called "Song Sung Blueberry," in celebration of the film, that Jackman served at their Greenfield location on December 2, 2025. Jackman and Brewer later attended a showing at the Oriental Theatre in Milwaukee.

At a special screening in Milwaukee, Jackman presented Claire Sardina with a commemorative engraved bench that will be permanently placed on the Wisconsin State Fair grounds. The bench is engraved with the saying Dream Huge - Sing Loud.

=== Home media ===
The film became available for purchase on digital platforms on January 13, 2026. A Blu-ray and DVD was released on February 17, 2026. The film became available for streaming on Peacock on February 13.

=== Musical numbers ===
Song Sung Blue (Music from the Motion Picture)

Soundtrack album
- Released: December 19, 2025
- Genre: Film soundtrack
- Length: 52:00
- Label: Back Lot Music
- Producer: Scott Bomar

Track listing (songs performed)
| No. | Title | Performer(s) | Length |
|---|---|---|---|
| 1. | "Cherry, Cherry" | Hugh Jackman, Kate Hudson | 2:39 |
| 2. | "I'm a Believer" | Hugh Jackman, Kate Hudson | 2:47 |
| 3. | "Oh Boy!" | Michael Imperioli | 2:07 |
| 4. | "Walkin' After Midnight" | Kate Hudson | 2:23 |
| 5. | "Get On Up" | The Ton3s | 2:31 |
| 6. | "Forever in Blue Jeans" | Hugh Jackman, Kate Hudson | 3:11 |
| 7. | "Sweet Caroline" | Hugh Jackman, Kate Hudson | 3:35 |
| 8. | "Play Me" | Hugh Jackman, Kate Hudson | 4:07 |
| 9. | "Crunchy Granola Suite" | Hugh Jackman, Kate Hudson | 3:20 |
| 10. | "Holly Holy" | Hugh Jackman, Kate Hudson | 4:15 |
| 11. | "Everyday" | Michael Imperioli | 2:11 |
| 12. | "Sweet Dreams" | Kate Hudson | 2:37 |
| 13. | "I Am... I Said" | Hugh Jackman | 3:30 |
| 14. | "I've Been This Way Before" | Kate Hudson | 3:43 |
| 15. | "Soolaimon / Brother Love's Travelling Salvation Show" | Hugh Jackman, Kate Hudson | 5:57 |
| 16. | "Song Sung Blue" | Hugh Jackman, Kate Hudson | 4:04 |
| Total length: | | | 52:00 |

==== Weekly charts ====
Weekly chart performance for Song Sung Blue
| Chart (2026) | Peak position |
|---|---|
| UK Compilation Albums (Official Charts) | 30 |
| UK Soundtrack Albums (Official Charts) | 2 |

== Reception ==
=== Box office ===
The film was released theatrically in the United States on December 25, 2025 by Focus Features. In the United States and Canada, Song Sung Blue was released alongside Marty Supreme and Anaconda, and was projected to gross $10–14 million from 2,578 theaters over its four-day opening weekend. It ended up debuting to $7.6 million (and a total of $12 million over the four days), finishing in eighth.

=== Critical response ===
On the review aggregator website Rotten Tomatoes, 77% of 211 critics' reviews are positive, with an average rating of 6.7/10. The website's consensus reads: "Bringing a sweet amount of dignity to the art of imitation, Song Sung Blue mostly avoids becoming a mere cover of the documentary on which it's based thanks to Hugh Jackman and Kate Hudson's heartfelt performances." Metacritic, which uses a weighted average, assigned the film a score of 61 out of 100, based on 46 critics, indicating "generally favorable" reviews. Audiences polled by CinemaScore gave the film an average grade of "A" on an A+ to F scale.

Amy Nicholson of the Los Angeles Times wrote: "You won't see a movie with better music and worse dialogue this holiday season than the bizarrely charming Song Sung Blue, a biopic about a husband-and-wife Neil Diamond cover band who were a fleeting sensation in 1990s Milwaukee." Caroline Siede of The A.V. Club wrote: "Based on the 2008 documentary by Greg Kohs, Sung Song Blue could have turned Mike and Claire into Christopher Guestian figures of comedy. Instead, it finds dignity within the bedazzled costumes, makeshift wind machines, and Thai restaurant performances that aid their increasingly popular novelty act."

Brian Truitt of USA Today wrote: "Can a major Hollywood star have another breakthrough role later in life? Because that's what it feels like watching Kate Hudson as a talented Midwestern pop-rock singer in Song Sung Blue. Ann Hornaday and Michael O'Sullivan of The Washington Post wrote: "You'd be forgiven for thinking Song Sung Blue is a Neil Diamond biopic. Hollywood can't seem to stop trying to immortalize famous performers by churning out heavy-handed reenactments of their inspiring life stories. What's another, really?"

Laura Venning of Empire wrote: "If you've found most recent music biopics to be snoozefests severely lacking in good old-fashioned melodrama, we bring good news. That is, unless you're allergic to sequins, luxuriant wigs and the musical stylings of Neil Diamond." Peter Bradshaw of The Guardian wrote: "Here is a startlingly strange, undeniably entertaining true-life story from the heartland of American showbusiness; a lovable crowdpleaser whose feelgood flavour won't prepare you for the way the plot repeatedly and savagely twists like an unsafe fairground ride."

Owen Gleiberman of Variety wrote: "'Song Sung Blue' is certainly a movie for the bom bom bom crowd. Mostly, though, it's for the Neil Diamond fans who will listen to Mike and Claire, in their solo show at the Ritz Theater in Milwaukee, in a state of slow-burn bliss. When Mike starts to sing the Arabic chant of Soolaimon, Diamond's single from 1970, it sounds eerie and mysterious, but when the groove kicks in it's so ecstatic you want to revel in its majesty, the same way Mike does: as a Diamond shining through the darkness." David Rooney of The Hollywood Reporter wrote " I'll confess I was an easy mark for this movie. A key childhood memory is sitting on my aunt's living room floor — she was groovy enough to have a "feature wall" of contrast wallpaper — playing the Hot August Night double album from start to finish while everyone else was outside digesting barbecue."

Jeannette Catsoulis of The New York Times wrote: "You are bound to be won over by "Song Sung Blue", a small-scaled, bighearted tale of a real-life Milwaukee duo who absorbed the hardest of life's knocks and refused to stay down." Kyle Smith of The Wall Street Journal wrote: "Song Sung Blue won me over early on, when a bar fight breaks out over the remark shouted by a leather-clad biker dude: “Neil Diamond sucks.” Fighting words, bordering on heresy."

=== Accolades ===
| Award | Date of ceremony | Category | Recipient(s) | Result | Ref. |
|---|---|---|---|---|---|
| AACTA Awards | February 6, 2026 | Best Actress | Kate Hudson | Nominated | |
| Academy Awards | March 15, 2026 | Best Actress | Kate Hudson | Nominated | |
| Actor Awards | March 1, 2026 | Outstanding Performance by a Female Actor in a Leading Role | Kate Hudson | Nominated | |
| BAFTA Awards | February 22, 2026 | Best Actress in a Leading Role | Kate Hudson | Nominated | |
| Golden Globe Awards | January 11, 2026 | Best Actress in a Motion Picture – Musical or Comedy | Kate Hudson | Nominated | |
| Golden Raspberry Awards | March 14, 2026 | Razzie Redeemer Award | Kate Hudson | Won | |
| Gotham Independent Film Awards | December 1, 2025 | Musical Tribute | Hugh Jackman and Kate Hudson | Won | |
| Hollywood Music in Media Awards | November 19, 2025 | Music Themed Film, Biopic or Musical | Craig Brewer | Nominated | |
| Palm Springs International Film Festival | January 3, 2026 | Icon Award Actress | Kate Hudson | Won | |
| Phoenix Film Critics Society | December 15, 2025 | Top Ten Films | Song Sung Blue | Won | |
| Savannah Film Festival | October 30, 2025 | Spotlight Director Award | Craig Brewer | Won | |
