= Claire Sardina =

American entertainer

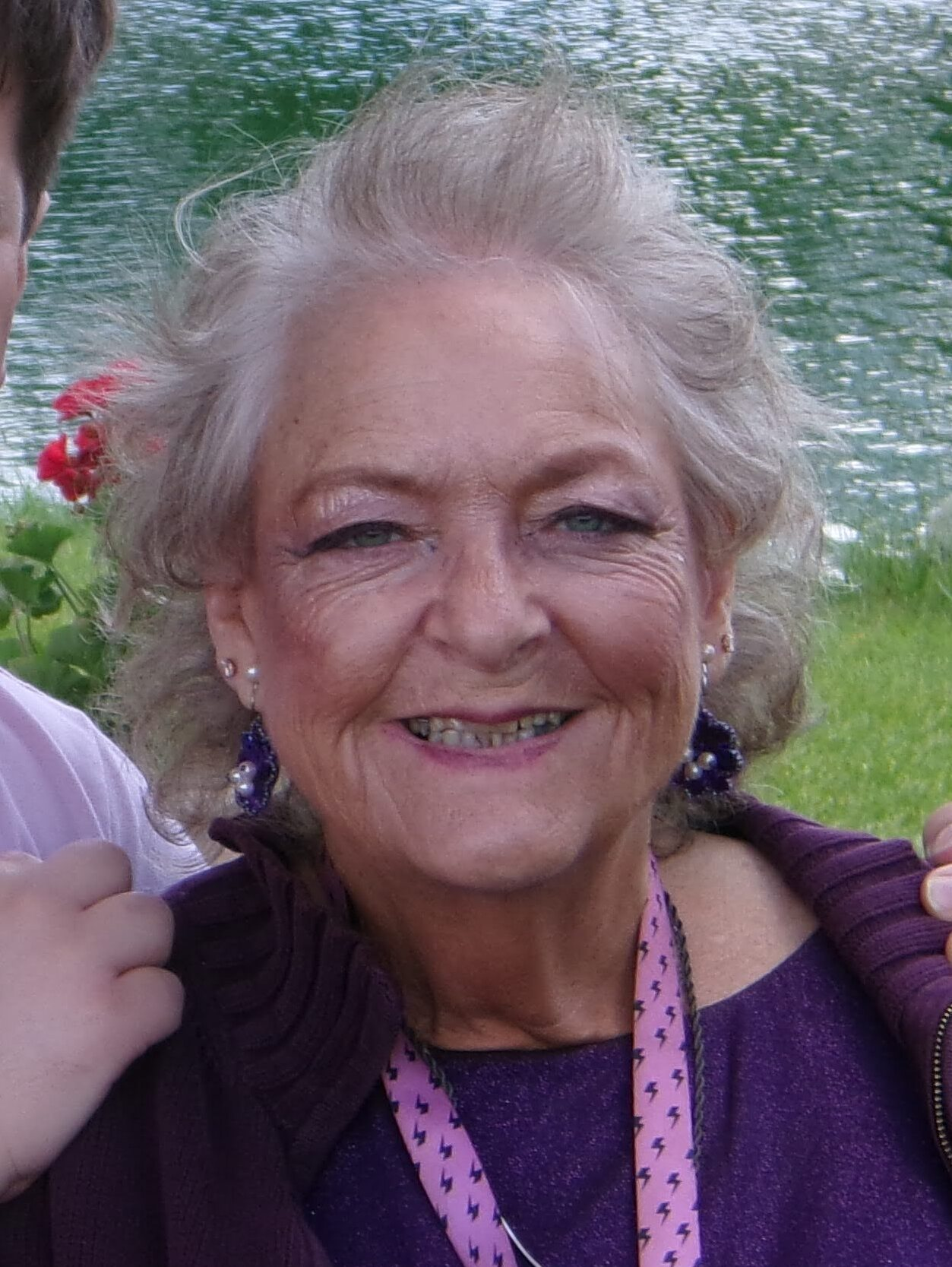
- Sardina in 2025
- Born: Claire Therese Stingl; December 23, 1961 (age 64); Milwaukee, Wisconsin, U.S.
- Occupation: Entertainer
- Years active: 1989–2006; 2016–present
- Spouses: Chuck Cartwright (divorced) Mike Sardina (m. 1994; died 2006)
- Children: 2
- Website: Lightning and Thunder

Claire Sardina (née Stingl; born December 23, 1961) is an American entertainer, known for her partnership with her husband Mike Sardina and their Neil Diamond tribute band, Lightning and Thunder, and her work as a Patsy Cline tribute artist. They have been the subjects of a documentary and feature film.

== Early life and education ==
Claire Sardina was born Claire Stingl in Milwaukee, Wisconsin, the daughter of Frances (née Cafferty; 1924–2011) and Kenneth Stingl (1920–1971), both factory workers. Her father died when she was nine years old from a sudden heart attack, and she was raised by a single mother, one of six children. Her brother Jim Stingl is a journalist with the Milwaukee Journal Sentinel. She graduated from Messmer High School, a private Catholic high school, where she sang in the choir, and then studied cosmetology at Milwaukee Area Technical College.

In 1999, she lost her leg when a car ran her over in the front yard of her home. She continued to perform with a prosthetic leg. She has two children with her first husband, as well as two grandchildren.

== Lightning and Thunder ==
She met Michael Henry "Mike" Sardina in 1987 when she auditioned for his band. A romance later began and they decided to start a band together titled Lightning and Thunder, with herself taking the nickname of "Thunder". The pair performed in the Milwaukee and Chicago areas throughout the 1980s and 1990s, often at state fairs, including the Wisconsin State Fair, music festivals like Summerfest, or as an opening act for major bands (including Pearl Jam), touring through the area. The band ended in 2006 after the death of Mike due to a head injury. Claire continues to perform as a solo act named Thunder After Lightning. In 2026, she was a special guest performer on the So Good! Neil Diamond Experience starring Robert Neary Tour, performing at the tour stops in Phoenix, Arizona and in Milwaukee.She also returned to perform at the Wisconsin State Fair in 2026.

In 2025, the Wisconsin Area Music Industry Association (WAMI) awarded the band with a lifetime achievement award in recognition of "giving Wisconsin decades of music, heart, and inspiration".

== Discography ==
=== Albums ===
In 1996, Lightning and Thunder released a studio recording featuring four original songs, and six covers. The album features her cover of the Patsy Cline standard Crazy.

Year	Title	Formats
1996	Hold On: Clean Songs Thru The School of Hard Knocks	Enhanced CD/Download

== Portrayal in media ==
A documentary about her life was created and released in 2008 by Greg Kohs titled Song Sung Blue.

A feature film about her life, based on the documentary, was released in 2025 by Focus Features, also titled Song Sung Blue. In the film she was portrayed by Kate Hudson. Hudson earned an Academy Award for Best Actress nomination for her performance as Sardina.
