= List of accolades received by The Sessions =

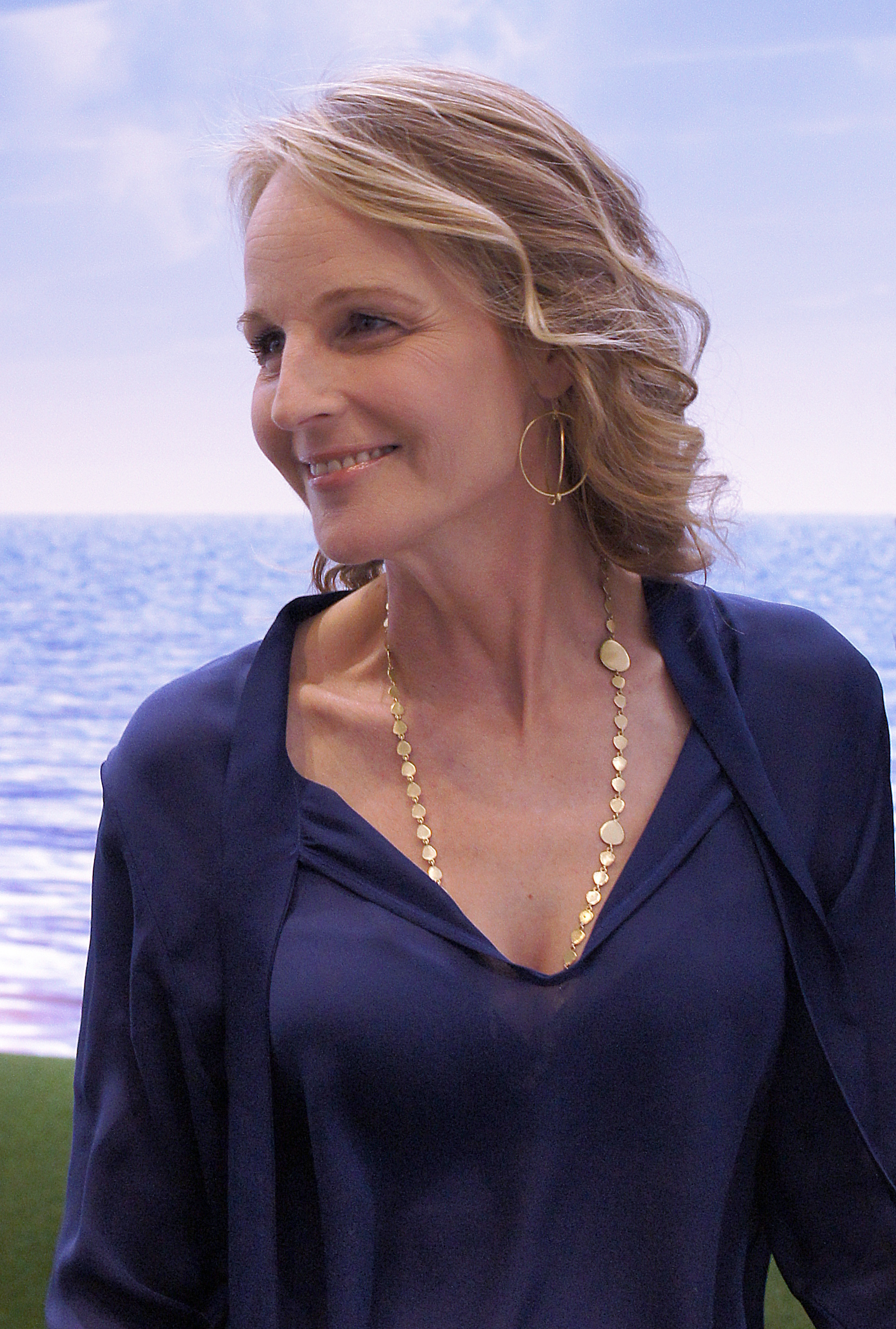
- Helen Hunt won several awards for her performance as Cheryl Cohen-Greene
Awards & nominations
Award	Won	Nominated
AACTA Awards	0	2
Academy Awards	0	1
Alliance of Women Film Journalists	1	3
British Academy Film Awards	0	1
Broadcast Film Critics Association	0	2
Casting Society of America	1	1
Central Ohio Film Critics Association	0	2
Chicago Film Critics Association	0	2
Dallas-Fort Worth Film Critics Association	0	2
Detroit Film Critics Society	0	2
Golden Globe Award	0	2
Golden Trailer Awards	0	1
Hollywood Film Festival	1	1
Houston Film Critics Society	0	2
Indiana Film Journalists Association	0	2
Independent Spirit Awards	2	2
International Film Music Critics Association	0	1
London Film Critics' Circle	0	1
Mill Valley Film Festival	1	1
Nevada Film Critics	2	2
Online Film Critics Society	0	2
Palm Springs International Film Festival	1	1
Philadelphia Film Festival	1	1
Phoenix Film Critics Society	0	2
San Diego Film Critics Society	0	2
San Francisco Film Critics Circle	1	1
San Sebastián International Film Festival	1	1
Satellite Awards	0	6
Screen Actors Guild Awards	0	2
St. Louis Film Critics	1	3
Sundance Film Festival	2	3
Tallinn Black Nights Film Festival	0	1
Utah Film Critics Association	0	1
Vancouver Film Critics Circle	0	2
Washington D.C. Area Film Critics	0	2
- Total number of wins and nominations
Totals	16	67
- References

The Sessions is a 2012 American independent drama film written and directed by Ben Lewin. It is based on an essay written by Mark O'Brien, a poet paralyzed by polio, who hired a sex surrogate to lose his virginity. John Hawkes and Helen Hunt star as O'Brien and sex surrogate Cheryl Cohen-Greene, respectively. The film premiered at the 2012 Sundance Film Festival under its original title The Surrogate and was immediately acquired by Fox Searchlight Pictures. The Sessions was released on October 19, 2012 in the United States. As of March 20, 2013, the film has earned over $9 million at the box office.

The film gathered various awards and nominations following its release, ranging from recognition of the film itself to Lewin's screenplay and the cast's acting performances, particularly those of Hawkes and Hunt. The AACTA Awards saw Lewin and Hawkes receive nominations for Best Direction and Best Actor. Hunt earned nominations for Best Supporting Actress at the 85th Academy Awards and the 66th British Academy Film Awards. The Alliance of Women Film Journalists awarded Hawkes and Hunt the Best Depiction of Nudity, Sexuality, or Seduction accolade.

Hawkes and Hunt garnered one nomination each from the 70th Golden Globe Awards. The film's international poster received a nomination from the Golden Trailer Awards, while Hawkes was named Breakthrough Actor at the Hollywood Film Festival. The Indiana Film Journalists Association nominated The Sessions for Best Picture and Hunt for Best Supporting Actress. At the 28th Independent Spirit Awards, Hawkes won Best Male Lead and Hunt won Best Supporting Female. They also went on to win Best Actor and Actress at the Nevada Film Critics Awards. Lewin collected the Audience Favorite Active Cinema Feature Award for the film at the Mill Valley Film Festival and the Audience Award at the San Sebastián International Film Festival.

The Sessions garnered six nominations from the Satellite Awards, including Best Adapted Screenplay, Best Director and Best Editing for Lisa Bromwell. Hawkes, Hunt and William H. Macy gathered nominations in the acting categories from the St. Louis Gateway Film Critics Association. At the 2012 Sundance Film Festival, The Sessions competed for the Grand Jury Prize for Dramatic Film. The film went on to win the Audience Award for Dramatic Film and the Dramatic Special Jury Prize for Ensemble Acting. Hawkes and Hunt earned nominations for Best Actor and Best Supporting Actress from both the Vancouver Film Critics Circle and the Washington D.C. Area Film Critics Association. Hawkes received a total of twenty-four nominations for his portrayal of O'Brien, while Hunt received twenty-six for her role as Cohen Greene.

== Awards and nominations ==
Award	Date of ceremony	Category	Recipients and nominees	Result
AACTA Awards	January 26, 2013	Best Actor	John Hawkes	Nominated
AACTA Awards	January 26, 2013	Best Direction	Ben Lewin	Nominated
Academy Awards	February 24, 2013	Best Supporting Actress	Helen Hunt	Nominated
Alliance of Women Film Journalists	January 7, 2013	Best Actor	John Hawkes	Nominated
Alliance of Women Film Journalists	January 7, 2013	Best Depiction of Nudity, Sexuality, or Seduction	Helen Hunt and John Hawkes	Won
Alliance of Women Film Journalists	January 7, 2013	Female Icon	Helen Hunt	Nominated
British Academy Film Awards	February 10, 2013	Best Supporting Actress	Helen Hunt	Nominated
Broadcast Film Critics Association	January 10, 2013	Best Actor	John Hawkes	Nominated
Broadcast Film Critics Association	January 10, 2013	Best Supporting Actress	Helen Hunt	Nominated
Casting Society of America	November 18, 2013	Best Casting in a Low Budget Comedy or Drama	The Sessions – Ronnie Yeskel	Won
Central Ohio Film Critics Association	January 3, 2013	Best Actor	John Hawkes	Nominated
Central Ohio Film Critics Association	January 3, 2013	Best Supporting Actress	Helen Hunt	Nominated
Chicago Film Critics Association	December 17, 2012	Best Actor	John Hawkes	Nominated
Chicago Film Critics Association	December 17, 2012	Best Supporting Actress	Helen Hunt	Nominated
Dallas-Fort Worth Film Critics Association	December 18, 2012	Best Actor	John Hawkes	Nominated
Dallas-Fort Worth Film Critics Association	December 18, 2012	Best Supporting Actress	Helen Hunt	Nominated
Detroit Film Critics Society	December 14, 2012	Best Actor	John Hawkes	Nominated
Detroit Film Critics Society	December 14, 2012	Best Supporting Actress	Helen Hunt	Nominated
Golden Globe Award	January 13, 2013	Best Actor in a Motion Picture — Drama	John Hawkes	Nominated
Golden Globe Award	January 13, 2013	Best Supporting Actress in a Motion Picture	Helen Hunt	Nominated
Golden Trailer Awards	May 3, 2013	Best International Poster	The Sessions – Fox Searchlight and Allcity	Nominated
Hollywood Film Festival	October 22, 2012	Breakthrough Actor	John Hawkes	Won
Houston Film Critics Society	January 5, 2013	Best Actor	John Hawkes	Nominated
Houston Film Critics Society	January 5, 2013	Best Supporting Actress	Helen Hunt	Nominated
Indiana Film Journalists Association	December 17, 2012	Best Picture	The Sessions	Nominated
Indiana Film Journalists Association	December 17, 2012	Best Supporting Actress	Helen Hunt	Nominated
Independent Spirit Awards	February 23, 2013	Best Male Lead	John Hawkes	Won
Independent Spirit Awards	February 23, 2013	Best Supporting Female	Helen Hunt	Won
International Film Music Critics Association	February 21, 2013	Best Original Score for a Comedy Film	Marco Beltrami	Nominated
London Film Critics' Circle	January 20, 2013	Actress of the Year	Helen Hunt	Nominated
Mill Valley Film Festival	October 14, 2012	Audience Favorite Active Cinema Feature	Ben Lewin	Won
Nevada Film Critics	December 24, 2012	Best Actor	John Hawkes	Won
Nevada Film Critics	December 24, 2012	Best Actress	Helen Hunt	Won
Online Film Critics Society	January 7, 2013	Best Actor	John Hawkes	Nominated
Online Film Critics Society	January 7, 2013	Best Supporting Actress	Helen Hunt	Nominated
Palm Springs International Film Festival	January 5, 2013	Spotlight Award	Helen Hunt	Won
Philadelphia Film Festival	October 28, 2012	Honorable Mention for Spotlights	The Sessions	Won
Phoenix Film Critics Society	December 14, 2012	Best Actor in a Leading Role	John Hawkes	Nominated
Phoenix Film Critics Society	December 14, 2012	Best Actress in a Supporting Role	Helen Hunt	Nominated
San Diego Film Critics Society	December 11, 2012	Best Actor	John Hawkes	Nominated
San Diego Film Critics Society	December 11, 2012	Best Actress	Helen Hunt	Nominated
San Francisco Film Critics Circle	December 16, 2012	Best Supporting Actress	Helen Hunt	Won
San Sebastián International Film Festival	September 29, 2012	Audience Award	Ben Lewin	Won
Satellite Awards	December 16, 2012	Best Actor	John Hawkes	Nominated
Satellite Awards	December 16, 2012	Best Adapted Screenplay	Ben Lewin	Nominated
Satellite Awards	December 16, 2012	Best Director	Ben Lewin	Nominated
Satellite Awards	December 16, 2012	Best Editing	Lisa Bromwell	Nominated
Satellite Awards	December 16, 2012	Best Film	The Sessions	Nominated
Satellite Awards	December 16, 2012	Best Supporting Actress	Helen Hunt	Nominated
Screen Actors Guild Awards	January 27, 2013	Best Actor in a Leading Role	John Hawkes	Nominated
Screen Actors Guild Awards	January 27, 2013	Best Female Actor in a Supporting Role	Helen Hunt	Nominated
St. Louis Gateway Film Critics Association	December 11, 2012	Best Actor	John Hawkes	Nominated
St. Louis Gateway Film Critics Association	December 11, 2012	Best Supporting Actor	William H. Macy	Nominated
St. Louis Gateway Film Critics Association	December 11, 2012	Best Supporting Actress	Helen Hunt	Won
Sundance Film Festival	January 28, 2012	Audience Award for Dramatic Film	Ben Lewin	Won
Sundance Film Festival	January 28, 2012	Dramatic Special Jury Prize for Ensemble Acting	The Sessions	Won
Sundance Film Festival	January 28, 2012	Grand Jury Prize for Dramatic Film	Ben Lewin	Nominated
Tallinn Black Nights Film Festival	November 28, 2012	Best North American Independent Film	Ben Lewin	Nominated
Utah Film Critics Association	January 10, 2012	Best Actor	John Hawkes	Nominated
Vancouver Film Critics Circle	January 7, 2013	Best Actor	John Hawkes	Nominated
Vancouver Film Critics Circle	January 7, 2013	Best Supporting Actress	Helen Hunt	Nominated
Washington D.C. Area Film Critics Association	December 10, 2012	Best Actor	John Hawkes	Nominated
Washington D.C. Area Film Critics Association	December 10, 2012	Best Supporting Actress	Helen Hunt	Nominated
