= List of accolades received by Lincoln (film) =

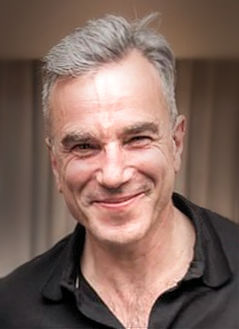
- Daniel Day-Lewis received critical acclaim for his performance as Abraham Lincoln
Awards and nominations
| Award | Won | Nominated |
| Academy Awards | 2 | 12 |
| AACTA International Awards | 1 | 4 |
| Alliance of Women Film Journalists | 1 | 7 |
| American Film Institute | 1 | 0 |
| Boston Society of Film Critics Awards | 3 | 3 |
| BAFTA Awards | 1 | 10 |
| Chicago Film Critics Awards | 2 | 8 |
| Critics' Choice Awards | 3 | 13 |
| Detroit Film Critics Society | 2 | 5 |
| Directors Guild of America Award | 0 | 1 |
| Dorian Awards | 1 | 2 |
| Golden Globe Awards | 1 | 7 |
| Grammy Awards | 0 | 1 |
| Houston Film Critics Society | 3 | 8 |
| National Board of Review of Motion Pictures | 1 | 1 |
| New York Film Critics Circle Awards | 3 | 3 |
| New York Film Critics Online | 3 | 3 |
| Producers Guild of America Awards | 0 | 1 |
| San Diego Film Critics Society Awards | 1 | 2 |
| San Francisco Film Critics Circle | 2 | 2 |
| Satellite Awards | 1 | 8 |
| Screen Actors Guild Awards | 2 | 4 |
| Washington D.C. Area Film Critics Association Awards | 1 | 9 |
| Women Film Critics Circle | 2 | 2 |
| Writers Guild of America Award | 1 | 2 |
- Total number of wins and nominations
| Totals | 41 | 131 |
- References

Lincoln is a 2012 American historical drama film directed and produced by Steven Spielberg, starring Daniel Day-Lewis as United States President Abraham Lincoln and Sally Field as Mary Todd Lincoln. The film is based in part on Doris Kearns Goodwin's biography of Lincoln, Team of Rivals: The Political Genius of Abraham Lincoln, and covers the final four months of Lincoln's life, focusing on the President's efforts in January 1865 to have the Thirteenth Amendment to the United States Constitution passed by the United States House of Representatives.

Lincoln premiered on October 8, 2012, at the New York Film Festival. The film was released on November 9, 2012, in select cities and widely released on November 16, 2012, in the United States by DreamWorks through Disney's Touchstone distribution label in the U.S. The film was released on January 25, 2013, in the United Kingdom, with distribution in international territories, including the U.K., by 20th Century Fox. The film received universal acclaim by critics and was nominated for 12 Academy Awards at the 85th ceremony, the most of any film released in 2012.

== Awards and nominations ==
| Award | Date of ceremony | Category | Recipients and nominees | Outcome |
|---|---|---|---|---|
| AFI Awards | January 11, 2013 | Movies of the Year | | Won |
| Academy Awards | February 24, 2013 | Best Picture | Steven Spielberg and Kathleen Kennedy | Nominated |
| Academy Awards | February 24, 2013 | Best Director | Steven Spielberg | Nominated |
| Academy Awards | February 24, 2013 | Best Actor | Daniel Day-Lewis | Won |
| Academy Awards | February 24, 2013 | Best Supporting Actor | Tommy Lee Jones | Nominated |
| Academy Awards | February 24, 2013 | Best Supporting Actress | Sally Field | Nominated |
| Academy Awards | February 24, 2013 | Best Adapted Screenplay | Tony Kushner | Nominated |
| Academy Awards | February 24, 2013 | Best Cinematography | Janusz Kamiński | Nominated |
| Academy Awards | February 24, 2013 | Best Costume Design | Joanna Johnston | Nominated |
| Academy Awards | February 24, 2013 | Best Film Editing | Michael Kahn | Nominated |
| Academy Awards | February 24, 2013 | Best Original Score | John Williams | Nominated |
| Academy Awards | February 24, 2013 | Best Production Design | Production Design: Rick Carter; Set Decoration: Jim Erickson | Won |
| Academy Awards | February 24, 2013 | Best Sound Mixing | Andy Nelson, Gary Rydstrom and Ron Judkins | Nominated |
| AACTA Awards | January 26, 2013 | Best International Film | Kathleen Kennedy and Steven Spielberg | Nominated |
| AACTA Awards | January 26, 2013 | Best International Direction | Steven Spielberg | Nominated |
| AACTA Awards | January 26, 2013 | Best International Screenplay | Tony Kushner | Nominated |
| AACTA Awards | January 26, 2013 | Best International Actor | Daniel Day-Lewis | Won |
| Alliance of Women Film Journalists | January 7, 2013 | Best Picture | | Nominated |
| Alliance of Women Film Journalists | January 7, 2013 | Best Director (Female or Male) | Steven Spielberg | Nominated |
| Alliance of Women Film Journalists | January 7, 2013 | Best Screenplay, Adapted | Tony Kushner | Nominated |
| Alliance of Women Film Journalists | January 7, 2013 | Best Actress in a Supporting Role | Sally Field | Nominated |
| Alliance of Women Film Journalists | January 7, 2013 | Best Actor | Daniel Day-Lewis | Won |
| Alliance of Women Film Journalists | January 7, 2013 | Best Actor in a Supporting Role | Tommy Lee Jones | Nominated |
| Alliance of Women Film Journalists | January 7, 2013 | Best Ensemble Cast | | Nominated |
| Boston Society of Film Critics Awards | December 9, 2012 | Best Actor | Daniel Day-Lewis | Won |
| Boston Society of Film Critics Awards | December 9, 2012 | Best Supporting Actress | Sally Field | Won |
| Boston Society of Film Critics Awards | December 9, 2012 | Best Screenplay | Tony Kushner | Won |
| British Academy Film Awards | February 10, 2013 | Best Film | | Nominated |
| British Academy Film Awards | February 10, 2013 | Best Actor in a Leading Role | Daniel Day-Lewis | Won |
| British Academy Film Awards | February 10, 2013 | Best Actor in a Supporting Role | Tommy Lee Jones | Nominated |
| British Academy Film Awards | February 10, 2013 | Best Actress in a Supporting Role | Sally Field | Nominated |
| British Academy Film Awards | February 10, 2013 | Best Adapted Screenplay | Tony Kushner | Nominated |
| British Academy Film Awards | February 10, 2013 | Best Cinematography | Janusz Kamiński | Nominated |
| British Academy Film Awards | February 10, 2013 | Best Original Music | John Williams | Nominated |
| British Academy Film Awards | February 10, 2013 | Best Production Design | Rick Carter, Jim Erickson | Nominated |
| British Academy Film Awards | February 10, 2013 | Best Costume Design | Joanna Johnston | Nominated |
| British Academy Film Awards | February 10, 2013 | Best Makeup and Hair | Leo Corey Castellano, Mia Kovero | Nominated |
| Cinema Audio Society Awards | 2013 | Outstanding Achievement in Sound Mixing for a Motion Picture – Live Action | Ron Judkins, Gary Rydstrom, Andy Nelson, Shawn Murphy, Bobby Johanson, Frank Rinella | Nominated |
| Chicago Film Critics Awards | December 17, 2012 | Best Picture | | Nominated |
| Chicago Film Critics Awards | December 17, 2012 | Best Director | Steven Spielberg | Nominated |
| Chicago Film Critics Awards | December 17, 2012 | Best Actor | Daniel Day-Lewis | Won |
| Chicago Film Critics Awards | December 17, 2012 | Best Supporting Actor | Tommy Lee Jones | Nominated |
| Chicago Film Critics Awards | December 17, 2012 | Best Supporting Actress | Sally Field | Nominated |
| Chicago Film Critics Awards | December 17, 2012 | Best Adapted Screenplay | Tony Kushner | Won |
| Chicago Film Critics Awards | December 17, 2012 | Best Cinematography | Janusz Kamiński | Nominated |
| Chicago Film Critics Awards | December 17, 2012 | Best Art Direction | | Nominated |
| Critics' Choice Awards | January 10, 2013 | Best Picture | | Nominated |
| Critics' Choice Awards | January 10, 2013 | Best Director | Steven Spielberg | Nominated |
| Critics' Choice Awards | January 10, 2013 | Best Actor | Daniel Day-Lewis | Won |
| Critics' Choice Awards | January 10, 2013 | Best Supporting Actor | Tommy Lee Jones | Nominated |
| Critics' Choice Awards | January 10, 2013 | Best Supporting Actress | Sally Field | Nominated |
| Critics' Choice Awards | January 10, 2013 | Best Acting Ensemble | | Nominated |
| Critics' Choice Awards | January 10, 2013 | Best Adapted Screenplay | Tony Kushner | Won |
| Critics' Choice Awards | January 10, 2013 | Best Cinematography | Janusz Kamiński | Nominated |
| Critics' Choice Awards | January 10, 2013 | Best Art Direction | Rick Carter, Jim Erickson | Nominated |
| Critics' Choice Awards | January 10, 2013 | Best Editing | Michael Kahn | Nominated |
| Critics' Choice Awards | January 10, 2013 | Best Costume Design | Joanna Johnston | Nominated |
| Critics' Choice Awards | January 10, 2013 | Best Makeup | Leo Corey Castellano, Mia Kovero | Nominated |
| Critics' Choice Awards | January 10, 2013 | Best Score | John Williams | Won |
| Detroit Film Critics Society Awards | December 14, 2012 | Best Actor | Daniel Day-Lewis | Won |
| Detroit Film Critics Society Awards | December 14, 2012 | Best Supporting Actor | Tommy Lee Jones | Nominated |
| Detroit Film Critics Society Awards | December 14, 2012 | Best Supporting Actress | Sally Field | Nominated |
| Detroit Film Critics Society Awards | December 14, 2012 | Best Ensemble | | Won |
| Detroit Film Critics Society Awards | December 14, 2012 | Best Screenplay | Tony Kushner | Nominated |
| Directors Guild of America Awards | February 2, 2012 | Outstanding Directorial Achievement in Feature Film | Steven Spielberg | Nominated |
| Dorian Awards | January 16, 2013 | Film of the Year | | Nominated |
| Dorian Awards | January 16, 2013 | Film Performance of the Year - Actor | Daniel Day-Lewis | Won |
| Golden Globe Awards | January 13, 2013 | Best Motion Picture - Drama | | Nominated |
| Golden Globe Awards | January 13, 2013 | Best Director | Steven Spielberg | Nominated |
| Golden Globe Awards | January 13, 2013 | Best Actor - Motion Picture Drama | Daniel Day-Lewis | Won |
| Golden Globe Awards | January 13, 2013 | Best Supporting Actor - Motion Picture | Tommy Lee Jones | Nominated |
| Golden Globe Awards | January 13, 2013 | Best Supporting Actress - Motion Picture | Sally Field | Nominated |
| Golden Globe Awards | January 13, 2013 | Best Screenplay | Tony Kushner | Nominated |
| Golden Globe Awards | January 13, 2013 | Best Original Score | John Williams | Nominated |
| Golden Trailer Awards | May 5, 2013 | Best Drama | | Nominated |
| Golden Trailer Awards | May 5, 2013 | Most Original TV Spot | | Nominated |
| Golden Trailer Awards | May 5, 2013 | Don LaFontaine Award for Best Voice Over | | Nominated |
| Grammy Awards | January 26, 2014 | Best Score Soundtrack for Visual Media | John Williams | Nominated |
| Houston Film Critics Awards | January 6, 2012 | Best Picture | | Nominated |
| Houston Film Critics Awards | January 6, 2012 | Best Director | Steven Spielberg | Nominated |
| Houston Film Critics Awards | January 6, 2012 | Best Actor | Daniel Day-Lewis | Won |
| Houston Film Critics Awards | January 6, 2012 | Best Supporting Actor | Tommy Lee Jones | Won |
| Houston Film Critics Awards | January 6, 2012 | Best Supporting Actress | Sally Field | Nominated |
| Houston Film Critics Awards | January 6, 2012 | Best Screenplay | Tony Kushner | Won |
| Houston Film Critics Awards | January 6, 2012 | Best Cinematography | Janusz Kamiński | Nominated |
| Houston Film Critics Awards | January 6, 2012 | Best Score | John Williams | Nominated |
| International Film Music Critics Association Awards | February 21, 2013 | Film Score of the Year | John Williams | Nominated |
| International Film Music Critics Association Awards | February 21, 2013 | Film Composer of the Year | John Williams | Nominated |
| International Film Music Critics Association Awards | February 21, 2013 | Best Original Score for a Drama Film | John Williams | Won |
| International Film Music Critics Association Awards | February 21, 2013 | Film Music Composition of the Year - The Peterson House and Finale | John Williams | Nominated |
| National Board of Review of Motion Pictures | December 5, 2012 | Top 10 Films | | Won |
| New York Film Critics Circle Awards | December 3, 2012 | Best Actor | Daniel Day-Lewis | Won |
| New York Film Critics Circle Awards | December 3, 2012 | Best Supporting Actress | Sally Field | Won |
| New York Film Critics Circle Awards | December 3, 2012 | Best Screenplay | Tony Kushner | Won |
| New York Film Critics Online Awards | December 9, 2012 | Top 10 Films of 2012 | | Won |
| New York Film Critics Online Awards | December 9, 2012 | Best Actor | Daniel Day-Lewis | Won |
| New York Film Critics Online Awards | December 9, 2012 | Best Supporting Actor | Tommy Lee Jones | Won |
| Producers Guild of America Awards | January 26, 2013 | Best Theatrical Motion Picture | Kathleen Kennedy and Steven Spielberg | Nominated |
| San Diego Film Critics Society Awards | December 11, 2012 | Best Actor | Daniel Day-Lewis | Won |
| San Diego Film Critics Society Awards | December 11, 2012 | Best Adapted Screenplay | Tony Kushner | Nominated |
| San Francisco Film Critics Circle | December 16, 2012 | Best Adapted Screenplay | Tony Kushner | Won |
| San Francisco Film Critics Circle | December 16, 2012 | Best Supporting Actor | Tommy Lee Jones | Won |
| Satellite Awards | December 16, 2012 | Best Picture | | Nominated |
| Satellite Awards | December 16, 2012 | Best Director | Steven Spielberg | Nominated |
| Satellite Awards | December 16, 2012 | Best Actor - Motion Picture | Daniel Day-Lewis | Nominated |
| Satellite Awards | December 16, 2012 | Best Supporting Actor - Motion Picture | Tommy Lee Jones | Nominated |
| Satellite Awards | December 16, 2012 | Best Adapted Screenplay | Tony Kushner | Nominated |
| Satellite Awards | December 16, 2012 | Best Original Score | John Williams | Nominated |
| Satellite Awards | December 16, 2012 | Best Cinematography | Janusz Kamiński | Nominated |
| Satellite Awards | December 16, 2012 | Best Art Direction and Production Design | Curt Beech, Rick Carter, David Crank, and Leslie McDonald | Won |
| Screen Actors Guild Awards | January 27, 2013 | Outstanding Performance by a Cast in a Motion Picture | | Nominated |
| Screen Actors Guild Awards | January 27, 2013 | Outstanding Performance by a Male Actor in a Leading Role | Daniel Day-Lewis | Won |
| Screen Actors Guild Awards | January 27, 2013 | Outstanding Performance by a Male Actor in a Supporting Role | Tommy Lee Jones | Won |
| Screen Actors Guild Awards | January 27, 2013 | Outstanding Performance by a Female Actor in a Supporting Role | Sally Field | Nominated |
| Washington D.C. Area Film Critics Association Awards | December 10, 2012 | Best Picture | | Nominated |
| Washington D.C. Area Film Critics Association Awards | December 10, 2012 | Best Director | Steven Spielberg | Nominated |
| Washington D.C. Area Film Critics Association Awards | December 10, 2012 | Best Actor | Daniel Day-Lewis | Won |
| Washington D.C. Area Film Critics Association Awards | December 10, 2012 | Best Supporting Actor | Tommy Lee Jones | Nominated |
| Washington D.C. Area Film Critics Association Awards | December 10, 2012 | Best Supporting Actress | Sally Field | Nominated |
| Washington D.C. Area Film Critics Association Awards | December 10, 2012 | Best Adapted Screenplay | Tony Kushner | Nominated |
| Washington D.C. Area Film Critics Association Awards | December 10, 2012 | Best Ensemble | | Nominated |
| Washington D.C. Area Film Critics Association Awards | December 10, 2012 | Best Art Direction | Rick Carter and Jim Erickson | Nominated |
| Washington D.C. Area Film Critics Association Awards | December 10, 2012 | Best Score | John Williams | Nominated |
| Women Film Critics Awards | December 22, 2012 | Best Actor | Daniel Day-Lewis | Won |
| Women Film Critics Awards | December 22, 2012 | Best Male Images | | Won |
| Writers Guild of America Awards | February 17, 2013 | Best Adapted Screenplay | Tony Kushner | Nominated |
| Writers Guild of America Awards | February 17, 2013 | Paul Selvin Award | Tony Kushner | Won |
