= Dallas–Fort Worth Film Critics Association Awards 2012 =

Annual US film awards ceremony

18th Dallas–Fort Worth Film Critics Association Awards
- Date: December 18, 2012
- Location: Dallas, Texas
- Country: United States
- Presented by: Dallas–Fort Worth Film Critics Association
- Website: https://dfwcritics.com/

The 18th Dallas–Fort Worth Film Critics Association Awards honoring the best in film for 2012 were announced on December 18, 2012. These awards "recognizing extraordinary accomplishment in film" are presented annually by the Dallas–Fort Worth Film Critics Association (DFWFCA), based in the Dallas–Fort Worth metroplex region of Texas. The organization, founded in 1990, includes 30 film critics for print, radio, television, and internet publications based in north Texas. The Dallas–Fort Worth Film Critics Association began presenting its annual awards list in 1991.

Lincoln was the DFWFCA's most awarded film of 2012 taking top honors for Best Picture, Best Actor (Daniel Day-Lewis), Best Supporting Actor (Tommy Lee Jones), and Best Supporting Actress (Sally Field), plus the association's inaugural award for Best Musical Score (John Williams). This continued a trend of critics groups across the United States giving their top prizes to the film about the final four months of the life of Abraham Lincoln, the 16th President of the United States, and his efforts to outlaw slavery with the Thirteenth Amendment.

Only one other film, Zero Dark Thirty earned multiple 2012 honors from the DFWFCA. It received top honors for Best Actress (Jessica Chastain), Best Director (Kathryn Bigelow), and Best Screenplay (Mark Boal). The other films earning honors were Austria's Amour for Best Foreign Language Film, Searching for Sugar Man as Best Documentary Film, ParaNorman for Best Animated Film, and Life of Pi for Best Cinematography (Claudio Miranda).

Along with the 12 "best of" category awards, the group also presented the Russell Smith Award to Beasts of the Southern Wild as the "best low-budget or cutting-edge independent film" of the year. The award is named in honor of late Dallas Morning News film critic Russell Smith.

== Winners ==
Winners are listed first and highlighted with boldface. Other films ranked by the annual poll are listed in order. While most categories saw 5 honorees named, categories ranged from as many as 10 (Best Film) to as few as 2 (Best Cinematography, Best Screenplay) plus the new Best Musical Score category having only the winner announced.

=== Category awards ===
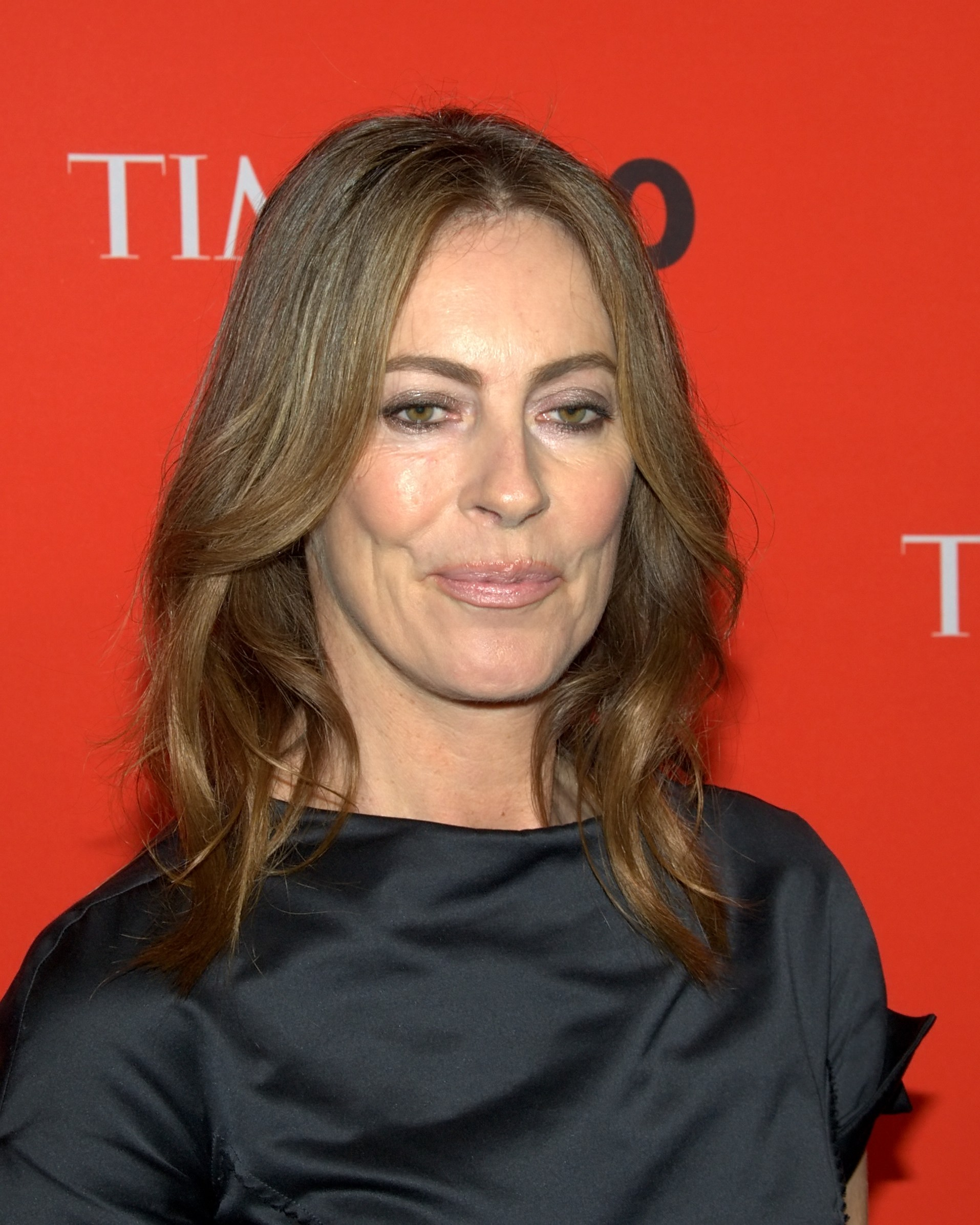
Kathryn Bigelow, Best Director winner

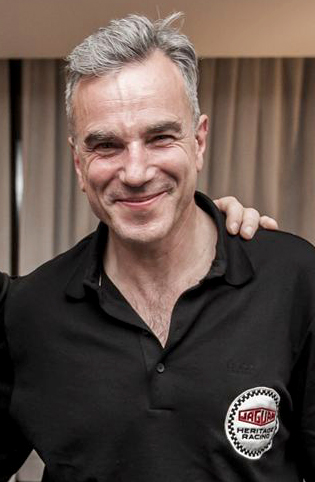
Daniel Day-Lewis, Best Actor winner

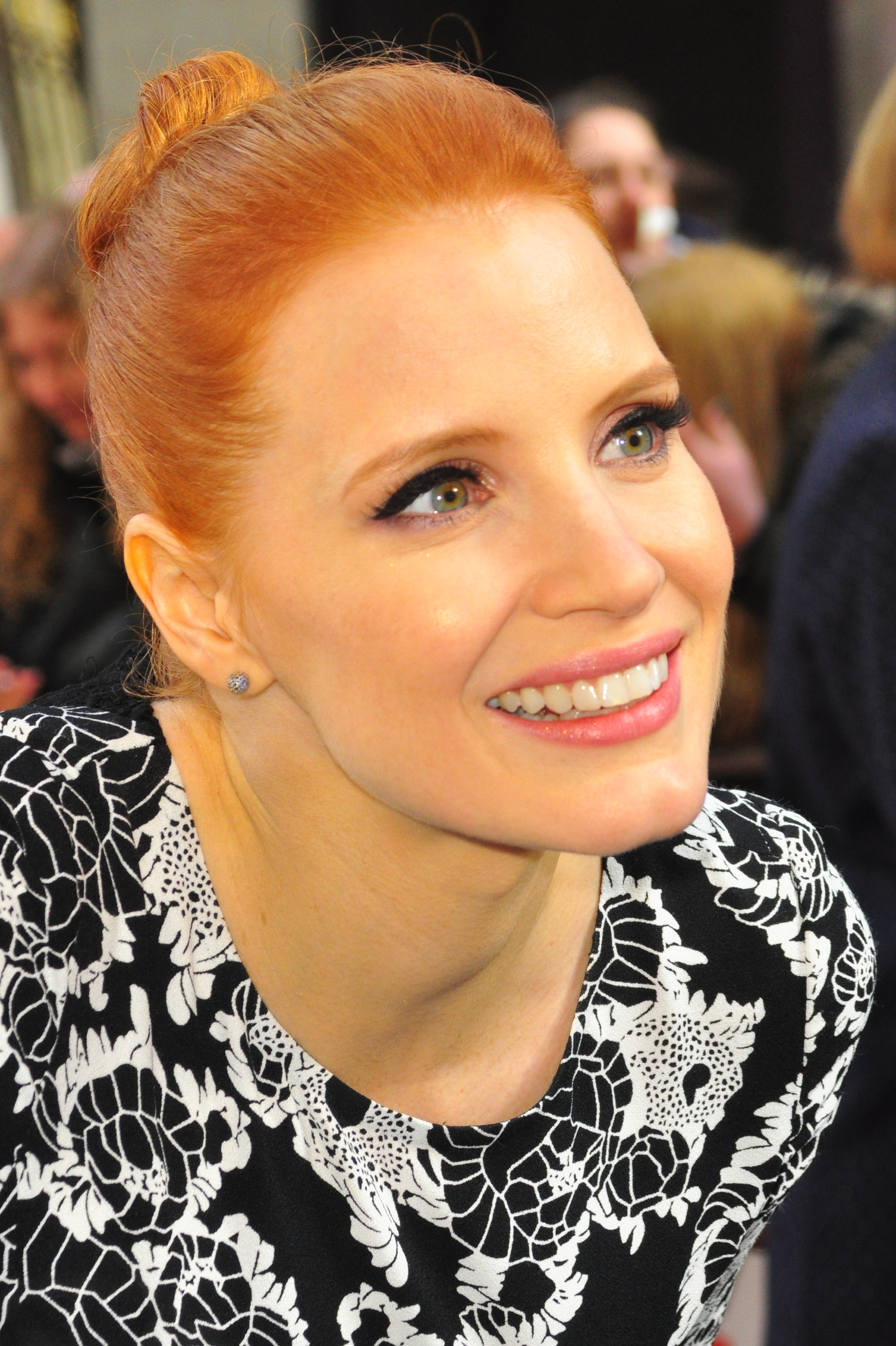
Jessica Chastain, Best Actress winner

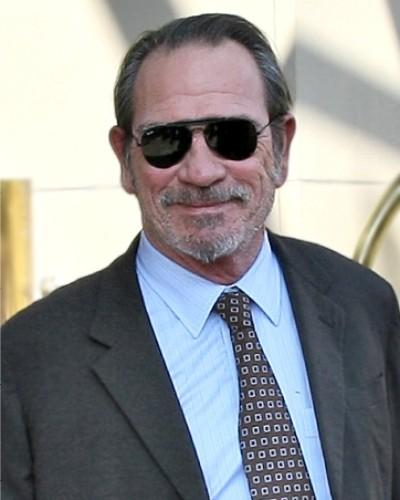
Tommy Lee Jones, Best Supporting Actor winner

Sally Field, Best Supporting Actress winner

Best Picture	Best Foreign Language Film
1. **Lincoln**; 2. Argo; 3. Zero Dark Thirty; 4. Life of Pi; 5. Les Misérables; 6. Moonrise Kingdom; 7. Silver Linings Playbook; 8. Skyfall; 9. The Master; 10. Beasts of the Southern Wild	1. **Amour** • Austria; 2. A Royal Affair • Denmark; 3. The Intouchables • France; 4. Holy Motors • France; 5. The Kid with a Bike • Belgium
Best Actor	Best Actress
1. **Daniel Day-Lewis** - Lincoln as Abraham Lincoln; 2. Joaquin Phoenix - The Master as Freddie Quell; 3. John Hawkes - The Sessions as Mark O'Brien; 4. Hugh Jackman - Les Misérables as Jean Valjean; 5. Denzel Washington - Flight as William "Whip" Whitaker, Sr.	1. **Jessica Chastain** - Zero Dark Thirty as Maya; 2. Jennifer Lawrence - Silver Linings Playbook as Tiffany Maxwell; 3. Helen Mirren - Hitchcock as Alma Reville; 4. Emmanuelle Riva - Amour as Anne Laurent; 5. Naomi Watts - The Impossible as Maria Bennett **(TIE)** Quvenzhané Wallis - Beasts of the Southern Wild as Hushpuppy **(TIE)**
Best Supporting Actor	Best Supporting Actress
1. **Tommy Lee Jones** - Lincoln as Thaddeus Stevens; 2. Philip Seymour Hoffman - The Master as Lancaster Dodd; 3. Christoph Waltz - Django Unchained as Dr. King Schultz; 4. Alan Arkin - Argo as Lester Siegel; 5. Robert De Niro - Silver Linings Playbook as Patrizio "Pat" Solitano, Sr	1. **Sally Field** - Lincoln as Mary Todd Lincoln; 2. Anne Hathaway - Les Misérables as Fantine; 3. Amy Adams - The Master as Peggy Dodd; 4. Helen Hunt - The Sessions as Cheryl Cohen-Greene; 5. Ann Dowd - Compliance as Sandra
Best Director	Best Documentary Film
1. **Kathryn Bigelow** - Zero Dark Thirty; 2. Steven Spielberg - Lincoln; 3. Ben Affleck - Argo; 4. Ang Lee - Life of Pi; 5. Wes Anderson - Moonrise Kingdom	1. **Searching for Sugar Man**; 2. Bully; 3. How to Survive a Plague; 4. West of Memphis; 5. The Invisible War
Best Animated Film	Best Cinematography
1. **ParaNorman**; 2. Frankenweenie; 3. The Pirates! Band of Misfits	1. **Claudio Miranda** - Life of Pi; 2. Roger Deakins - Skyfall
Best Screenplay	Best Musical Score
1. **Mark Boal** - Zero Dark Thirty; 2. Quentin Tarantino - Django Unchained	1. **John Williams** - Lincoln

=== Individual awards ===
==== Russell Smith Award ====
- Beasts of the Southern Wild, for "best low-budget or cutting-edge independent film"
