= Quiz Lady (soundtrack) =

Quiz Lady (Original Soundtrack)

Film score by Nick Urata
- Released: November 3, 2023
- Recorded: 2023
- Studio: Newman Scoring Stage, 20th Century Studios, Los Angeles
- Genre: Film score
- Length: 34:55
- Label: Hollywood
- Producer: Nick Urata

Nick Urata chronology
A Really Haunted Loud House (2023)	Quiz Lady (Original Soundtrack) (2023)	National Anthem (2024)

Quiz Lady (Original Soundtrack) is the soundtrack to the 2023 film Quiz Lady, directed by Jessica Yu. It features the film's original score composed by Nick Urata which was released by the Hollywood Records label on November 3, 2023.

== Development ==
In August 2023, it was announced that Nick Urata would compose the score for Quiz Lady; he previously worked with Yu on Misconception (2014) and Maria Bamford: Old Baby (2017). Prior to the film's production, Yu asked Urata to write a theme that resembled the fictional TV game show within a film. Breaking down the themes of iconic game shows, he utilized an orchestra and drums that run on high tempo and composed a similar theme for the game show Can't Stop the Quiz.

Urata then wrote the theme for the principal characters: the sisters Anne (Awkwafina) and Jemmy Yum (Sandra Oh). While the former was represented with a sombre, melodic theme, the latter—who is being reckless and chaotic—had been represented with highly percussive elements, where he used both South American and orchestral percussions. Ron Heacock's (Jason Schwartzman) theme was represented with a lower end of B_{3} note while Terry McTeer (Will Ferrell) was represented with a harp glissando which is played when Anne meets McTeer for the first time.

According to Urata, while composing music for comedy films, it had to be over-the-top at times. While most of the music had been set in the American settings, Urata did write cues underlying the landscape of Scottish music as one of the characters being obsessed with Alan Cumming, where he used a sackbut, an instrument used in the Renaissance and Baroque periods. For the final act of the film, Urata conducted a bombastic sound that consisted of live drums, percussion, brass, trumpet, French horn and electronic instruments to highlight the tense moments. David Krystal conducted and orchestrated the score which was played by the Hollywood Studio Symphony.

== Release ==
Hollywood Records published the Quiz Lady soundtrack featuring 22 tracks from Urata's score and the song "We Got It" by Meilee. It was released on November 3, 2023, in conjunction with the film's streaming premiere on Hulu.

== Reception ==
Tara Karajica of Alliance of Women Film Journalists described the score as "energetic". Neil Z. Yeung of AllMusic described it as "an exciting score from Nick Urata". Lovia Gyarkye of The Hollywood Reporter and Peter Debruge of Variety called it as "engaging" and "brooding". Matt Minton of Geek Vibes Nation wrote "The mixture of the more gentle instrumentation by composers DeVotchKa and Nick Urata with pop songs is a clear example of this disconnect."

== Track listing ==
Quiz Lady (Original Soundtrack) track listing
No.	Title	Length
1.	"Can't Stop the Quiz"	0:44
2.	"Jenny's Theme"	1:43
3.	"All the Answers"	1:04
4.	"Jenny's Ideas"	1:10
5.	"Quiz Lady Is Born"	2:44
6.	"Who's Called Ken Anymore"	2:48
7.	"You Are Not Marybeth"	1:13
8.	"Poop Story"	1:43
9.	"It's Just an Audition"	0:44
10.	"Because I Want Some"	0:51
11.	"Anne's First Audition"	1:13
12.	"You Crushed It"	1:15
13.	"Ken's Den"	1:52
14.	"The Show Must Go On"	0:41
15.	"Ron and Terry"	0:57
16.	"Gametime"	2:18
17.	"Mr. Linguini"	1:59
18.	"Wisdom from Terry"	2:12
19.	"The Final Showdown"	2:39
20.	"Hero"	0:58
21.	"Not Alan Cummings"	1:27
22.	"Sisters"	0:58
23.	"We Got It" (Meilee)	1:42
Total length:		34:55

== Additional music ==
The following songs are featured in the film, but not included in the soundtrack:

- "I Don't Feel Like Dancin'" by Scissor Sisters
- "Guerrilla" by Remi Wolf
- "More" by J-Hope
- "My Own Worst Enemy" by Lit
- "Quiet On Set" by Remi Wolf
- "Eye of the Tiger" by Survivor
- "Walkin' on the Sun" by Smash Mouth
- "America the Beautiful" by Smooth Jazz All Stars
- "Angry Girl (Chai Version)" by Confidence Man and CHAI
- "Watermelon Sugar" by Harry Styles
- "Good Morning" by The Dandy Warhols
- "edamame" by bbno$ feat. Rich Brian
- "Shake That Brass" by Amber Liu feat. Taeyeon
- "Growing Up" by The Linda Lindas

== Charts ==
Chart performance for Quiz Lady (Original Soundtrack)
Chart (2023)	Peak position
UK Soundtrack Albums (OCC)	49
US Top Soundtracks (Billboard)	25
