= 19th Screen Actors Guild Awards =

- Awarded for: Outstanding motion picture and primetime television performances
- Date: January 27, 2013
- Location: Shrine Auditorium; Los Angeles, California
- Country: United States
- Presented by: SAG-AFTRA
- Website: www.sagawards.org

Television/radio coverage
- Network: TNT and TBS simultaneous broadcast

The 19th Annual Screen Actors Guild Awards, awarded by the Screen Actors Guild and honoring the best achievements in film and television performances for the year 2012, were presented on January 27, 2013, at the Shrine Exposition Center in Los Angeles, California, for the seventeenth consecutive year. It was broadcast simultaneously by TNT and TBS, which collectively gained 5.2 million viewers, leading the two networks to sign a three-year television contract with SAG-AFTRA. The nominees were announced on December 12, 2012.

Dick Van Dyke was announced as the 2012 SAG Life Achievement Award honoree on August 21, 2012.

== Winners and nominees ==
Winners are listed first and highlighted in boldface.

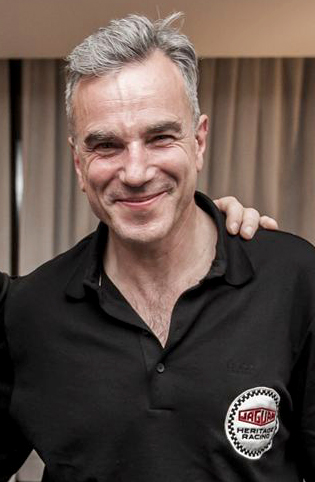
Daniel Day-Lewis, Outstanding Performance by a Male Actor in a Leading Role winner

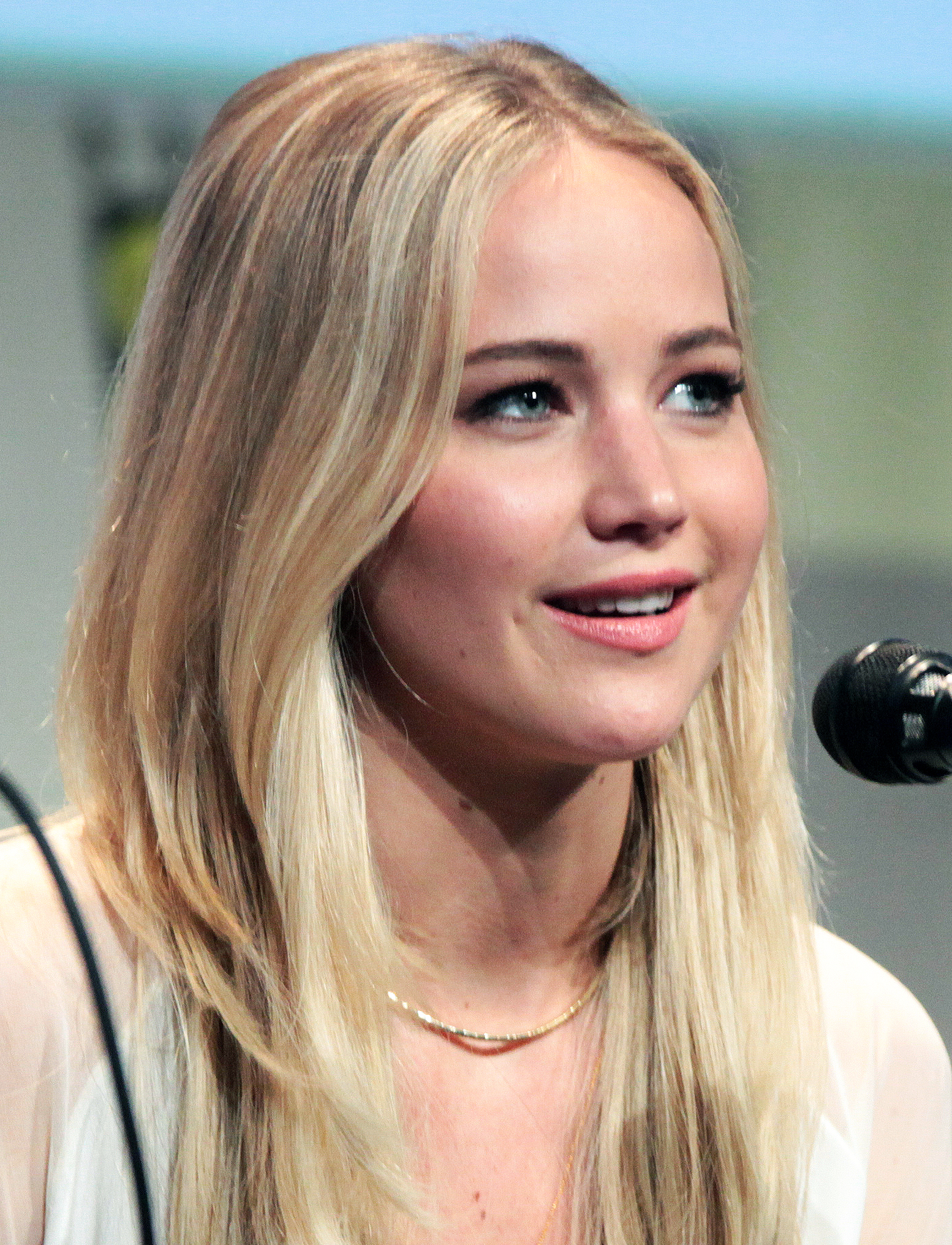
Jennifer Lawrence, Outstanding Performance by a Female Actor in a Leading Role winner

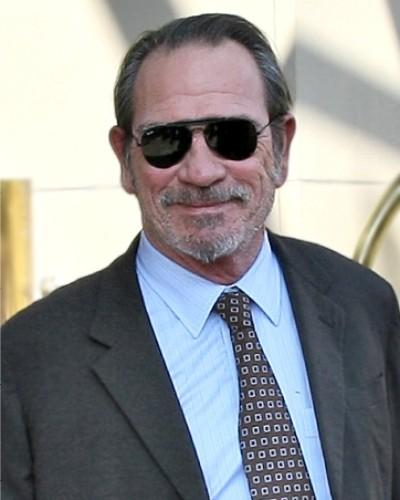
Tommy Lee Jones, Outstanding Performance by a Male Actor in a Supporting Role winner

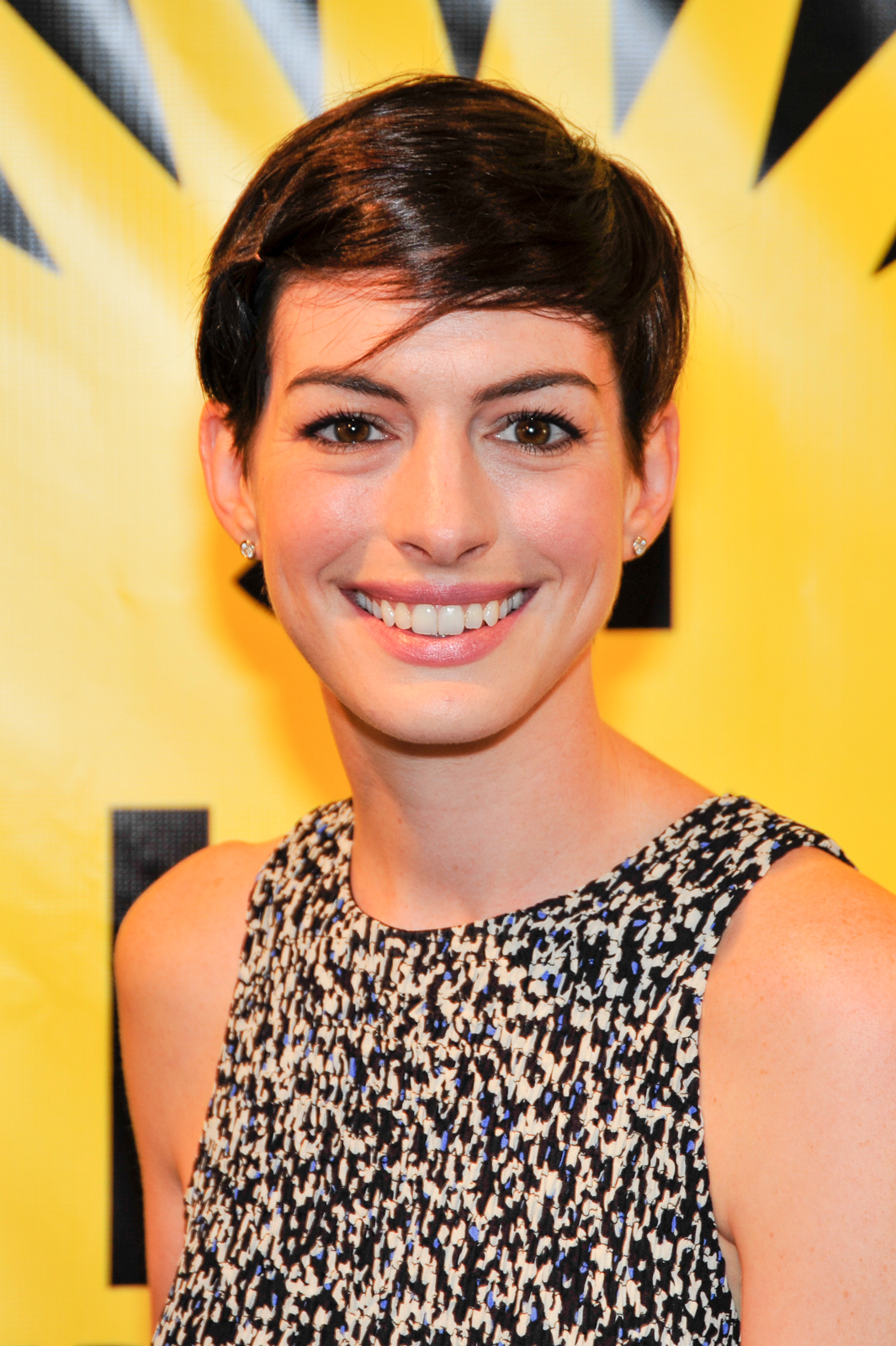
Anne Hathaway, Outstanding Performance by a Female Actor in a Supporting Role winner

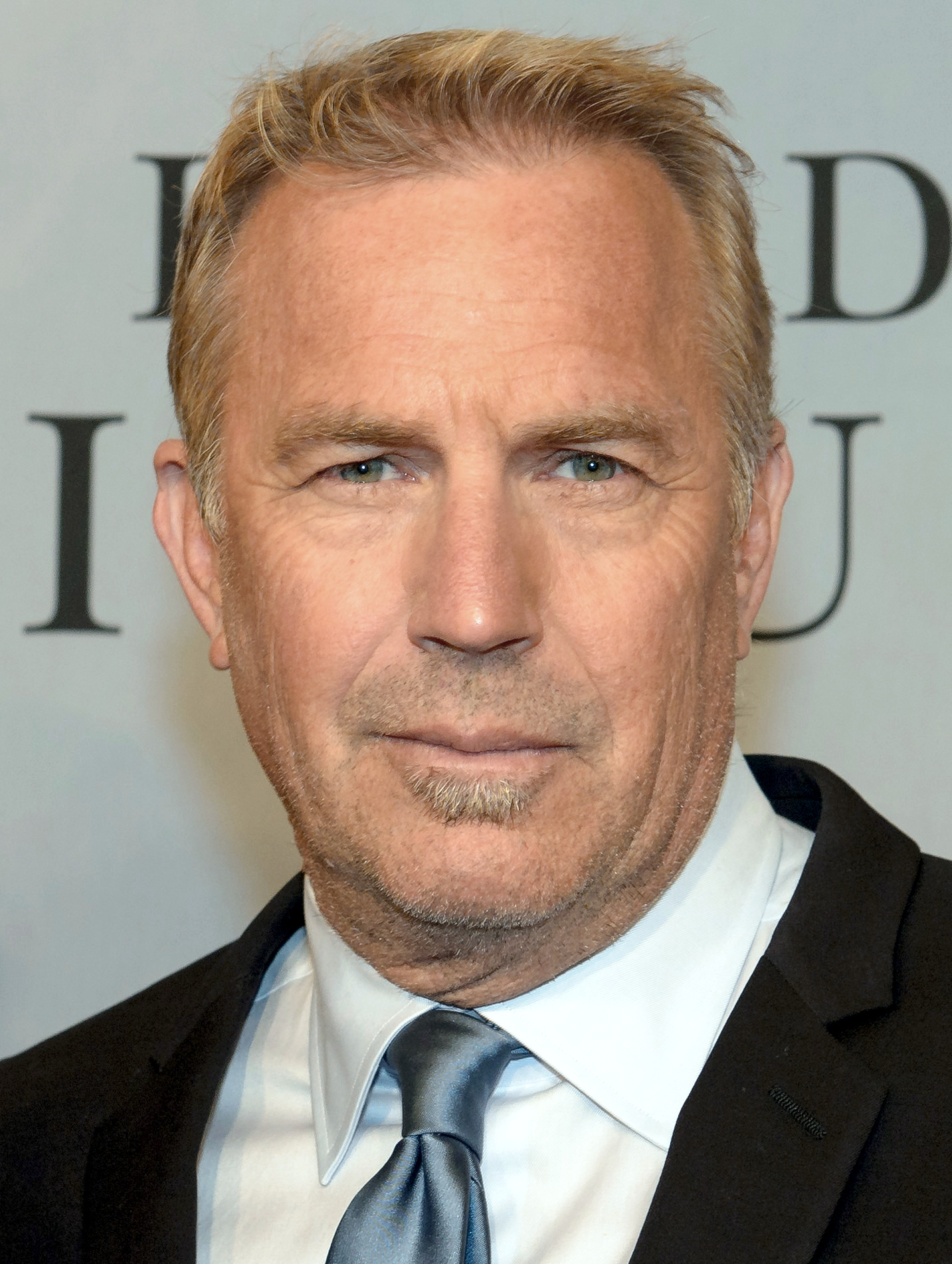
Kevin Costner, Outstanding Performance by a Male Actor in a Miniseries or Television Movie winner

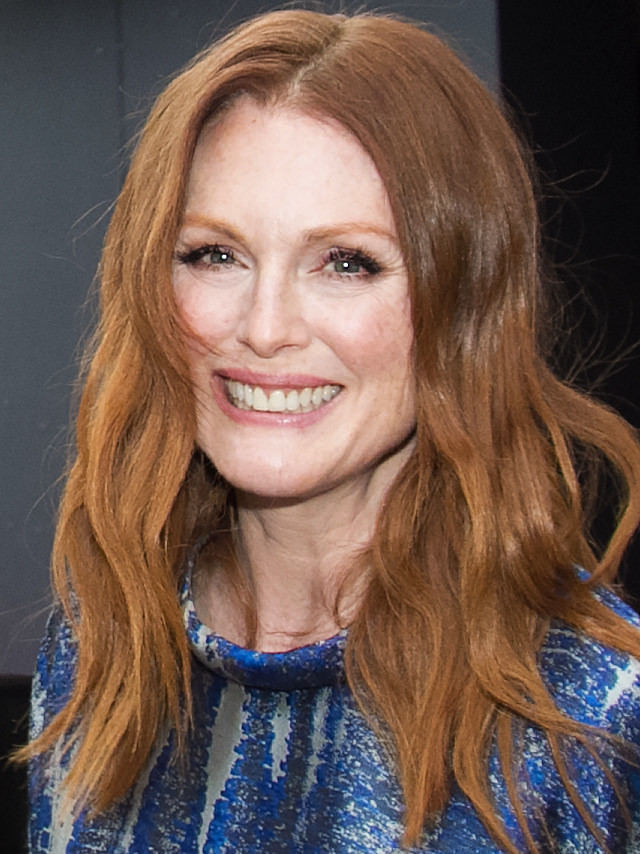
Julianne Moore, Outstanding Performance by a Female Actor in a Miniseries or Television Movie winner

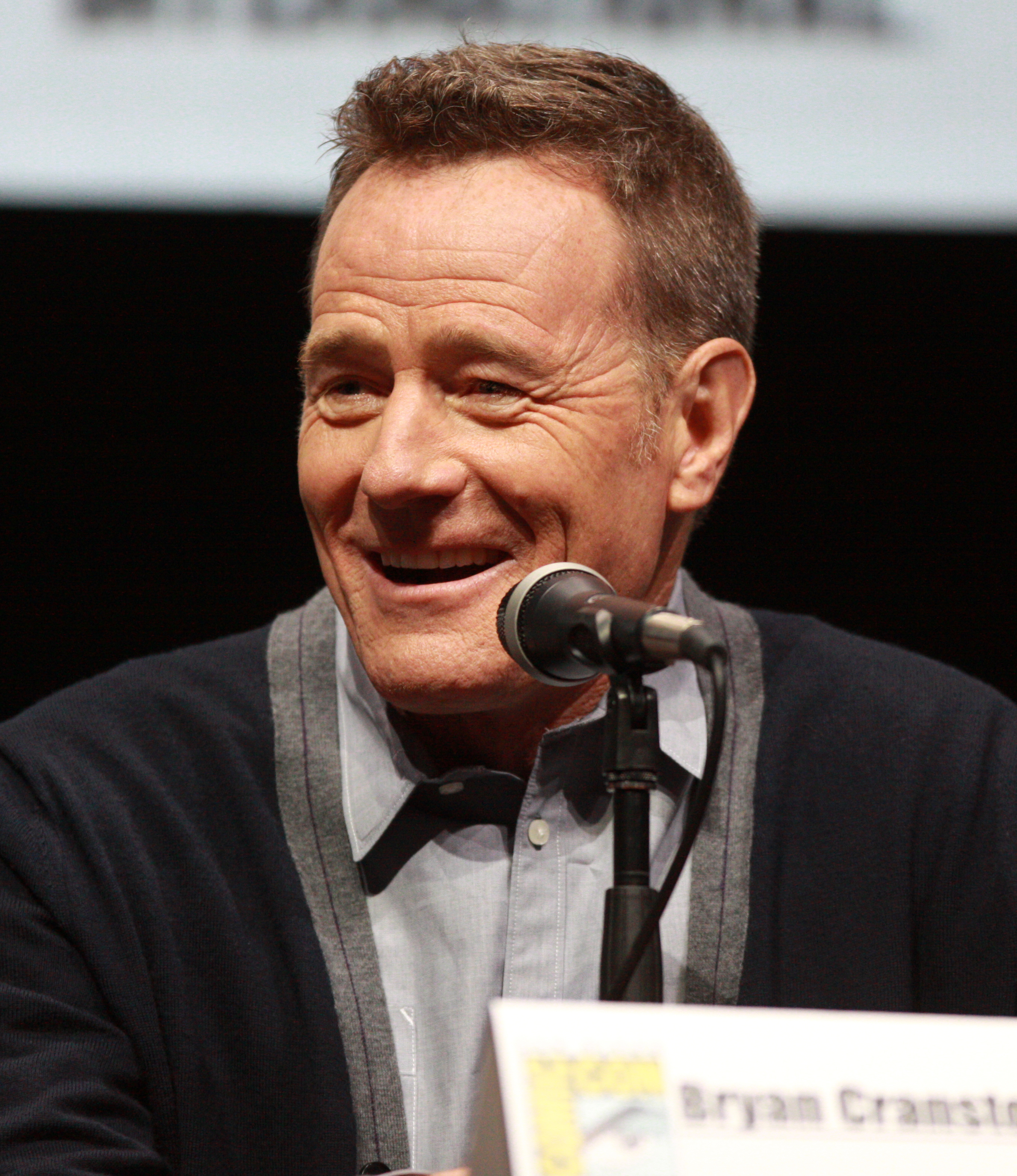
Bryan Cranston, Outstanding Performance by a Male Actor in a Drama Series winner

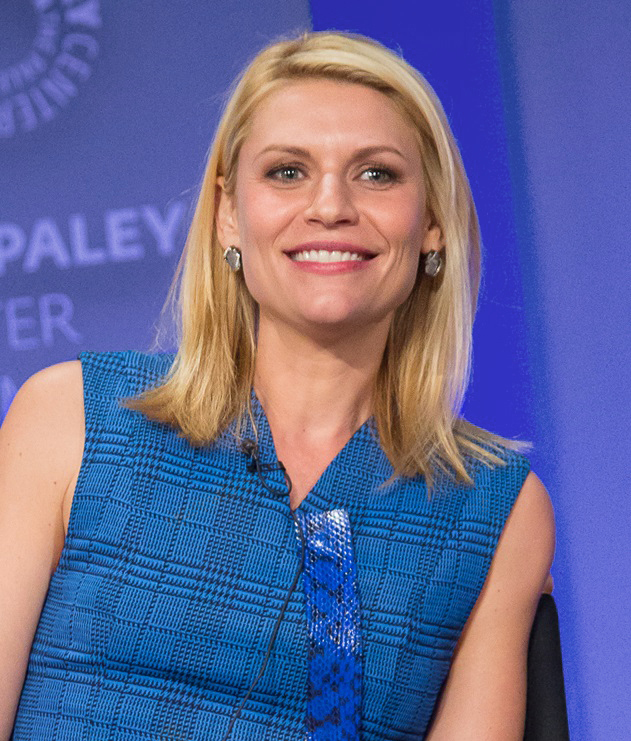
Claire Danes, Outstanding Performance by a Female Actor in a Drama Series winner

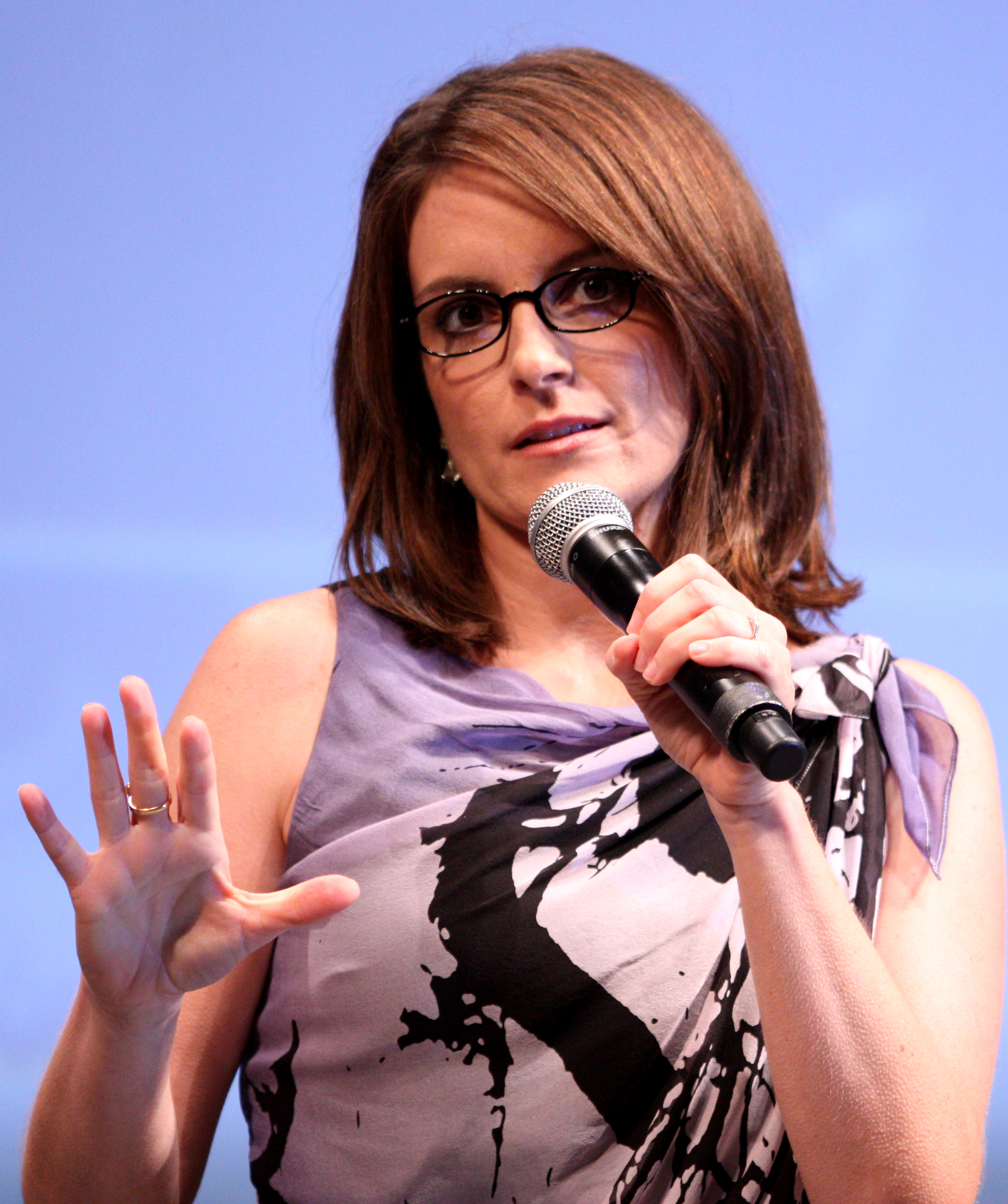
Tina Fey, Outstanding Performance by a Female Actor in a Comedy Series winner

=== Film ===
Outstanding Performance by a Male Actor in a Leading Role	Outstanding Performance by a Female Actor in a Leading Role
**Daniel Day-Lewis – Lincoln as Abraham Lincoln**; Bradley Cooper – Silver Linings Playbook as Patrizio "Pat" Solitano Jr.; John Hawkes – The Sessions as Mark O'Brien; Hugh Jackman – Les Misérables as Jean Valjean; Denzel Washington – Flight as William "Whip" Whitaker Sr.	**Jennifer Lawrence – Silver Linings Playbook as Tiffany Maxwell**; Jessica Chastain – Zero Dark Thirty as Maya; Marion Cotillard – Rust and Bone as Stéphanie; Helen Mirren – Hitchcock as Alma Reville; Naomi Watts – The Impossible as Maria Bennett
Outstanding Performance by a Male Actor in a Supporting Role	Outstanding Performance by a Female Actor in a Supporting Role
**Tommy Lee Jones – Lincoln as Thaddeus Stevens**; Alan Arkin – Argo as Lester Siegel; Javier Bardem – Skyfall as Raoul Silva; Robert De Niro – Silver Linings Playbook as Patrizio "Pat" Solitano Sr.; Philip Seymour Hoffman – The Master as Lancaster Dodd	**Anne Hathaway – Les Misérables as Fantine**; Sally Field – Lincoln as Mary Todd Lincoln; Helen Hunt – The Sessions as Cheryl Cohen-Greene; Nicole Kidman – The Paperboy as Charlotte Bless; Maggie Smith – The Best Exotic Marigold Hotel as Muriel Donnelly
Outstanding Performance by a Cast in a Motion Picture
**Argo – Ben Affleck, Alan Arkin, Kerry Bishé, Kyle Chandler, Rory Cochrane, Bryan Cranston, Christopher Denham, Tate Donovan, Clea DuVall, Victor Garber, John Goodman, Scoot McNairy and Chris Messina**; The Best Exotic Marigold Hotel – Judi Dench, Celia Imrie, Bill Nighy, Dev Patel, Ronald Pickup, Maggie Smith, Tom Wilkinson and Penelope Wilton; Les Misérables – Isabelle Allen, Samantha Barks, Sacha Baron Cohen, Helena Bonham Carter, Russell Crowe, Anne Hathaway, Daniel Huttlestone, Hugh Jackman, Eddie Redmayne, Amanda Seyfried, Aaron Tveit and Colm Wilkinson; Lincoln – Daniel Day-Lewis, Sally Field, Joseph Gordon-Levitt, Hal Holbrook, Tommy Lee Jones, James Spader and David Strathairn; Silver Linings Playbook – Bradley Cooper, Robert De Niro, Anupam Kher, Jennifer Lawrence, Chris Tucker and Jacki Weaver
Outstanding Performance by a Stunt Ensemble in a Motion Picture
**Skyfall**; The Amazing Spider-Man; The Bourne Legacy; The Dark Knight Rises; Les Misérables

=== Television ===
Outstanding Performance by a Male Actor in a Television Movie or Miniseries	Outstanding Performance by a Female Actor in a Television Movie or Miniseries
**Kevin Costner – Hatfields & McCoys (History) as Devil Anse Hatfield**; Woody Harrelson – Game Change (HBO) as Steve Schmidt; Ed Harris – Game Change (HBO) as John McCain; Clive Owen – Hemingway & Gellhorn (HBO) as Ernest Hemingway; Bill Paxton – Hatfields & McCoys (History) as Randolph McCoy	**Julianne Moore – Game Change (HBO) as Sarah Palin**; Nicole Kidman – Hemingway & Gellhorn (HBO) as Martha Gellhorn; Charlotte Rampling – Restless (Sundance TV) as Eva Delectorskaya; Sigourney Weaver – Political Animals (USA Network) as Elaine Barrish Hammond; Alfre Woodard – Steel Magnolias (Lifetime) as Ouiser
Outstanding Performance by a Male Actor in a Drama Series	Outstanding Performance by a Female Actor in a Drama Series
**Bryan Cranston – Breaking Bad (AMC) as Walter White**; Steve Buscemi – Boardwalk Empire (HBO) as Nucky Thompson; Jeff Daniels – The Newsroom (HBO) as Will McAvoy; Jon Hamm – Mad Men (AMC) as Don Draper; Damian Lewis – Homeland (Showtime) as Nicholas Brody	**Claire Danes – Homeland (Showtime) as Carrie Mathison**; Michelle Dockery – Downton Abbey (PBS) as Lady Mary Crawley; Jessica Lange – American Horror Story: Asylum (FX) as Sister Jude Martin / Judy Martin; Julianna Margulies – The Good Wife (CBS) as Alicia Florrick; Maggie Smith – Downton Abbey (PBS) as Violet, Dowager Countess of Grantham
Outstanding Performance by a Male Actor in a Comedy Series	Outstanding Performance by a Female Actor in a Comedy Series
**Alec Baldwin – 30 Rock (NBC) as Jack Donaghy**; Ty Burrell – Modern Family (ABC) as Phil Dunphy; Louis C.K. – Louie (FX) as Louie; Jim Parsons – The Big Bang Theory (CBS) as Dr. Sheldon Cooper; Eric Stonestreet – Modern Family (ABC) as Cameron Tucker	**Tina Fey – 30 Rock (NBC) as Liz Lemon**; Edie Falco – Nurse Jackie (Showtime) as Jackie Peyton; Amy Poehler – Parks and Recreation (NBC) as Leslie Knope; Sofía Vergara – Modern Family (ABC) as Gloria Delgado-Pritchett; Betty White – Hot in Cleveland (TV Land) as Elka Ostrovsky
Outstanding Performance by an Ensemble in a Drama Series
**Downton Abbey (PBS) – Hugh Bonneville, Zoe Boyle, Laura Carmichael, Jim Carter, Brendan Coyle, Michelle Dockery, Jessica Brown Findlay, Siobhan Finneran, Joanne Froggatt, Iain Glen, Thomas Howes, Rob James-Collier, Allen Leech, Phyllis Logan, Elizabeth McGovern, Sophie McShera, Lesley Nicol, Amy Nuttall, David Robb, Maggie Smith, Dan Stevens and Penelope Wilton**; Boardwalk Empire (HBO) – Steve Buscemi, Chris Caldovino, Bobby Cannavale, Meg Chambers Steedle, Charlie Cox, Jack Huston, Patrick Kennedy, Anthony Laciura, Kelly Macdonald, Gretchen Mol, Vincent Piazza, Paul Sparks, Michael Stuhlbarg, Shea Whigham and Anatol Yusef; Breaking Bad (AMC) – Jonathan Banks, Betsy Brandt, Bryan Cranston, Laura Fraser, Anna Gunn, RJ Mitte, Dean Norris, Bob Odenkirk, Aaron Paul, Jesse Plemons and Steven Michael Quezada; Homeland (Showtime) – Morena Baccarin, Timothée Chalamet, Claire Danes, Rupert Friend, David Harewood, Diego Klattenhoff, Damian Lewis, David Marciano, Navid Negahban, Jackson Pace, Mandy Patinkin, Zuleikha Robinson, Morgan Saylor and Jamey Sheridan; Mad Men (AMC) – Ben Feldman, Jay R. Ferguson, Jon Hamm, Jared Harris, Christina Hendricks, Vincent Kartheiser, Robert Morse, Elisabeth Moss, Jessica Paré, Teyonah Parris, Kiernan Shipka, John Slattery, Rich Sommer and Aaron Staton
Outstanding Performance by an Ensemble in a Comedy Series
**Modern Family (ABC) – Aubrey Anderson-Emmons, Julie Bowen, Ty Burrell, Jesse Tyler Ferguson, Nolan Gould, Sarah Hyland, Ed O'Neill, Rico Rodriguez, Eric Stonestreet, Sofía Vergara and Ariel Winter**; 30 Rock (NBC) – Scott Adsit, Alec Baldwin, Tina Fey, Judah Friedlander, Jane Krakowski, Jack McBrayer, Tracy Morgan and Keith Powell; The Big Bang Theory (CBS) – Mayim Bialik, Kaley Cuoco, Johnny Galecki, Simon Helberg, Kunal Nayyar, Jim Parsons and Melissa Rauch; Glee (Fox) – Dianna Agron, Chris Colfer, Darren Criss, Samuel Larsen, Vanessa Lengies, Jane Lynch, Jayma Mays, Kevin McHale, Lea Michele, Cory Monteith, Heather Morris, Matthew Morrison, Alex Newell, Chord Overstreet, Amber Riley, Naya Rivera, Mark Salling, Harry Shum Jr. and Jenna Ushkowitz; Nurse Jackie (Showtime) – Mackenzie Aladjem, Eve Best, Jake Cannavale, Bobby Cannavale, Peter Facinelli, Edie Falco, Dominic Fumusa, Arjun Gupta, Lenny Jacobson, Ruby Jerins, Paul Schulze, Anna Deavere Smith, Stephen Wallem and Merritt Wever; The Office (NBC) – Leslie David Baker, Brian Baumgartner, Creed Bratton, Clark Duke, Jenna Fischer, Kate Flannery, Ed Helms, Mindy Kaling, Ellie Kemper, Angela Kinsey, John Krasinski, Jake Lacy, Paul Lieberstein, B. J. Novak, Oscar Nuñez, Craig Robinson, Phyllis Smith, Catherine Tate and Rainn Wilson
Outstanding Performance by a Stunt Ensemble in a Television Series
**Game of Thrones (HBO)**; Boardwalk Empire (HBO); Breaking Bad (AMC); Sons of Anarchy (FX); The Walking Dead (AMC)

=== Screen Actors Guild Life Achievement Award ===
- Dick Van Dyke

== Multiple nominations ==
=== Film ===
Nominations	Film
4	Les Misérables
4	Lincoln
4	Silver Linings Playbook
2	Argo
2	The Best Exotic Marigold Hotel
2	The Sessions
2	Skyfall

=== Television ===
Nominations	Program
4	Modern Family
3	30 Rock
3	Boardwalk Empire
3	Breaking Bad
3	Downton Abbey
3	Game Change
3	Homeland
2	The Big Bang Theory
2	Hatfields & McCoys
2	Hemingway & Gellhorn
2	Mad Men
2	Nurse Jackie

== Multiple wins ==
=== Film ===
Wins	Film
2	Lincoln

=== Television ===
Wins	Program
2	30 Rock

== In Memoriam ==
Jessica Chastain introduced a previously recorded "In Memoriam" segment, which honored the life and career of the actors who died in 2012:

- Ben Gazzara
- George Lindsey
- Lupe Ontiveros
- Deborah Raffin
- Peter Breck
- Larry Hagman
- Whitney Houston
- Alex Karras
- Martha Greenhouse
- Susan Tyrrell
- Al Freeman Jr.
- Gary Collins
- Nicol Williamson
- Robert Hegyes
- Ron Palillo
- Jack Klugman
- Herbert Lom
- Conrad Bain
- Yale Summers
- Ann Rutherford
- Jonathan Frid
- Harry Carey Jr.
- Chad Everett
- Celeste Holm
- Sherman Hemsley
- James Farentino
- Tony Epper
- Michael Clarke Duncan
- Russell Means
- Warren Stevens
- Frank Cady
- Charles Durning
- Yvette Wilson
- William Windom
- Davy Jones
- Kathryn Joosten
- Phyllis Diller
- Richard Dawson
- Dick Clark
- Andy Griffith
- Ernest Borgnine

== See also ==
- 2nd AACTA International Awards
- 65th Primetime Emmy Awards
- 66th British Academy Film Awards
- 70th Golden Globe Awards
- 85th Academy Awards
