= Surrogate partner =

Therapeutic practitioner trained in addressing issues of physical intimacy

Surrogate partners, formerly referred to as sex surrogates, are practitioners trained in addressing issues of intimacy and sexuality. The modality in which surrogate partners work is called surrogate partner therapy.

A surrogate partner works in collaboration with a talk therapist to meet the goals of their client.

This triadic model, composed of the client, talk therapist, and surrogate partner therapist is used to dually support the client and the surrogate partner therapist. The client engages with the surrogate partner therapist in experiential exercises and builds a relationship with their surrogate partner therapist while processing and integrating their experiences with their talk therapist or clinician.

Surrogate partner therapy is used to address obstacles to physical and emotional intimacy that a client is unable to resolve through traditional therapy and who require the involvement of a partner. Clients' presenting issues have commonly included sexual dysfunctions, lack of healthy intimate experiences, or traumatic history.

== History ==
The practice of "human sexual inadequacy" was introduced in 1970 by Masters and Johnson, who believed that people could learn about sexual intimacy only by experiencing it. In their research, subjects who were partnered used these partners to aid in a series of exercises designed to help overcome sexual dysfunction. Unpartnered subjects were paired with "surrogates" who would take the place of a partner, work under the direction of a trained therapist, and act as a form of mentor for the client. In their research, all the surrogates were women who were assigned to work with single men. The practice of surrogate partner therapy reached its peak in the early 1980s, with a few hundred surrogate partners practicing in the U.S. Since then, the therapy's popularity declined but it reentered social consciousness after the 2012 film The Sessions, which depicts one surrogate partner's work with a disabled man. Most surrogates are women, but a few are men. As of 2014, those practicing surrogate partner therapy were still very few in number.

== Typical problems ==
Patients frequently present with these specific problems:

- Communication problems
- Dating anxiety
- Lack of confidence
- Lack of experience
- Low sexual desire
- Physical disability
- Sexual inhibitions
- Trouble with intimacy
- Erectile dysfunction
- Genital pain
- History of sexual assault or sexual abuse
- Inability to ejaculate with a partner
- Premature ejaculation
- Sexual aversion disorder
- Vaginismus

There are people who have experienced a change in sexual lifestyle due to an acquired disability (accident, paralysis, disease, trauma), and a surrogate can help them explore and develop sexual potential. The causes of sexual concerns are numerous, and the methods a surrogate might use to help improve a client's sexual life are varied.

== Nonfiction accounts ==
The 2003 Salon.com article "I Was a Middle-Aged Virgin", by Michael Castleman, discusses Roger Andrews and his therapy with the surrogate partner Vena Blanchard.

Mark O'Brien's 1990 account, "On Seeing a Sex Surrogate", described his experiences with Cheryl Cohen-Greene. This became the basis of the 2012 film The Sessions. The same year, Chase-Greene's An Intimate Life: Sex, Love, and My Journey as a Surrogate Partner appeared in print.

== Documentaries ==
- The 1985 documentary Private Practices: The Story of a Sex Surrogate explored the relationship between surrogate partner (Maureen Sullivan), her clients, and her clients' talk therapists.
- The Discovery Fit & Health documentary My Sex Surrogate, first aired in 2013, follows a woman and a man as they each work with a surrogate partner. The surrogate partner who worked with him was Cheryl Cohen-Greene.
- The National Geographic show Taboo's episode "Forbidden Love" (Season 7, Episode 6, first aired 2011) featured a professional surrogate partner (Cheryl Cohen-Greene) in one of its segments.
- This Is Life with Lisa Ling dedicated an episode to "Sexual Healing" (Season 4, Episode 1).

== Depictions in fiction ==
- In a 1977 episode of the American sitcom Barney Miller titled "Sex Surrogate", a woman shoots her husband for seeing a surrogate partner therapist.
- My Therapist (1984), an American TV movie starring Marilyn Chambers, is about a surrogate partner therapist. It was based on her one-woman show Sex Surrogate, which in 1979 caused controversy in Vegas as it featured full-frontal nudity, which was banned from all casinos. In 1983, that one-woman show was spun off into a 26-part syndicated soap opera called Love Ya Florence Nightingale. It was broadcast on cable television channels such as the Playboy Channel.
- In the two-part episode "Party Girl" airing during Season 9 of American sitcom Night Court, which aired in 1992, the character Dan performed work as a surrogate partner therapist after meeting a woman who works as one.
- In the Season 3 (2006) premiere of Boston Legal, titled, "Can't We All Get a Lung?," attorney Jerry Espenson, who has Asperger syndrome sees surrogate partner therapist Joanna Monroe (Jane Lynch) at his counsel and compadre Alan Shore's (James Spader) behest.
- The Israeli movie Surrogate (2008) is about a female surrogate partner therapist (Lana Ettinger) treating a man (Amir Wolf) who was sexually abused as a child. The film was directed by Tali Shalom-Ezer and is based on research at Dr. Ronit Aloni's clinic in Tel Aviv.
- In Franklin & Bash (2011–2014), the character of Peter Bash's mother, played by Jane Seymour, is a surrogate partner therapist.
- The American movie The Sessions (2012) stars Helen Hunt as Cheryl, a surrogate partner therapist who helps polio survivor Mark (John Hawkes) lose his virginity at the age of 38, based on the true story of Mark O'Brien and Cheryl Cohen-Greene. O'Brien wrote about his experience in 1990.
- In an episode of Anger Management, "Charlie and the Virgin" (2013), a friend of Kate (Selma Blair) is a 32-year-old virgin who is looking for her first-time sexual encounter with a man. Charlie Goodson (Charlie Sheen) decides to be her first encounter as a faux surrogate partner therapist (not being professional or licensed), and she becomes attached to him. Later on she finds out that he (Charlie) was taking the place of a professional surrogate partner therapist for a real one provided to her.
- In the American science fiction drama Her (2013), Theodore engages with a surrogate partner therapist in order to bond more closely with his girlfriend Samantha, who is an artificial intelligence.
- The American movie She's Lost Control (2014) is about the professional and personal life of a surrogate partner therapist.
- In season 1 episode 10 of Backstrom (2015), "Love Is a Rose and You Better Not Pick It", the S.C.U. investigates when a young female surrogate partner therapist is found dead.
- Masters of Sex Season 3 episodes "Monkey Business" and "Surrogates" (both 2015) feature surrogate partner therapy; the show is a drama based on the work of Masters and Johnson.
- An episode of the American sitcom Too Close for Comfort has the character of Monroe, still a virgin, hiring a sex surrogat, only to misidentify a former tenant's sister as her.

== See also ==
- Somatic experiencing
- Sex therapy
- Sex work
- Sexual assistance
- Sexual dysfunction
