= The Sessions (2012 film) =

- Theatrical release poster
- Directed by: Ben Lewin
- Screenplay by: Ben Lewin
- Based on: "On Seeing a Sex Surrogate" by Mark O'Brien
- Produced by: Judi Levine; Stephen Nemeth; Ben Lewin
- Starring: John Hawkes; Helen Hunt; Moon Bloodgood; Annika Marks; Rhea Perlman; Adam Arkin; William H. Macy
- Cinematography: Geoffrey Simpson
- Edited by: Lisa Bromwell
- Music by: Marco Beltrami
- Production companies: Such Much Films; Rhino Films
- Distributed by: Fox Searchlight Pictures
- Release dates: January 23, 2012 (Sundance); October 19, 2012 (United States)
- Running time: 95 minutes
- Country: United States
- Language: English
- Budget: $1 million
- Box office: $10.7 million

The Sessions is a 2012 American drama film written and directed by Ben Lewin. It is based on the 1990 article "On Seeing a Sex Surrogate" by Mark O'Brien, an American poet. Paralyzed from the neck down due to polio, he hired a sex surrogate to lose his virginity. John Hawkes and Helen Hunt star as O'Brien and sex surrogate Cheryl Cohen-Greene, respectively.

The film debuted under its original title The Surrogate at the 2012 Sundance Film Festival, where it won the Audience Award Dramatic and a U.S. Dramatic Special Jury Prize for Ensemble Acting.

Fox Searchlight Pictures acquired the film's distribution rights and released the renamed film in October 2012. The Sessions received highly positive reviews from critics, who particularly lauded the performances of Hawkes and Hunt. Hunt was nominated for an Oscar for Best Supporting Actress at the 85th Academy Awards.

== Plot ==
In Berkeley, California, in 1988, Mark O'Brien is a 38-year-old poet who is forced to live in an iron lung due to complications from polio. Due to his condition, he has never had sex. After unsuccessfully proposing to his caretaker Amanda, and sensing he may be near death, he decides he wants to lose his virginity. After consulting his priest, Father Brendan, he gets in touch with Cheryl Cohen-Greene, a professional sex surrogate. She tells him they will have no more than six sessions together. They begin their sessions, but soon it is clear that they are developing romantic feelings for each other. Cheryl's husband, who loves her deeply, fights to suppress his jealousy, at first withholding a love poem that Mark has sent by mail to Cheryl, which she eventually finds. After several attempts, Mark and Cheryl are able to have mutually satisfying sex, but decide to cut the sessions short on account of their burgeoning feelings.

One day sometime later, the power goes out in the building in which Mark lives, causing the iron lung to stop functioning and making it necessary for Mark to be rushed to the hospital. However, he survives and meets a young woman named Susan Fernbach. The film then cuts to Mark's funeral, held sometime later in 1999, and attended by four of the women he came to know and care for, including Cheryl. Father Brendan gives the homily and Susan reads the poem he had previously sent Cheryl.

== Cast ==
- John Hawkes as Mark O'Brien
- Helen Hunt as Cheryl Cohen-Greene
- William H. Macy as Father Brendan
- Moon Bloodgood as Vera
- Annika Marks as Amanda
- Adam Arkin as Josh
- Rhea Perlman as Mikvah lady
- W. Earl Brown as Rod
- Robin Weigert as Susan Fernbach
- Blake Lindsley as Dr. Laura White
- Ming Lo as Clerk
- Rusty Schwimmer as Joan

== Production ==
=== Background ===
O'Brien was a journalist and poet who was paralyzed from the neck down by polio since his childhood. O'Brien breathed with the support of an iron lung for much of his life. At age 38, he hired sex surrogate Cheryl Cohen-Greene to help him lose his virginity. The film is based on an article O'Brien published about his experiences with Greene, "On Seeing a Sex Surrogate", which appeared in The Sun magazine in 1990.

O'Brien's life was chronicled in the 1996 short documentary Breathing Lessons: The Life and Work of Mark O'Brien, directed by Jessica Yu, which won an Academy Award for Best Documentary Short. He died in 1999 at the age of 49.

=== Development ===
Writer and director Ben Lewin, a polio survivor himself, first read about O'Brien's experiences with a sex surrogate from O'Brien's article "On Seeing a Sex Surrogate" on the Internet. He stumbled onto the article while researching sex and the disabled for a semi-autobiographical sitcom project. Lewin explained, "I felt that if I could do on film what he had done to me with his writing, then I could potentially deliver something powerful." While writing the script, Lewin drew from his own experiences with polio and worked closely with Susan Fernbach, O'Brien's partner during the last years of his life, and Cheryl Cohen-Greene, the surrogate.

=== Casting ===
John Hawkes said Lewin met and read with several disabled actors to take on the role of O'Brien but said "none of them felt quite right" for the character. Hawkes was drawn to the script due to Lewin's own experiences as a polio survivor. He read every article written by O'Brien, every poem by O'Brien he could find and credited Breathing Lessons for helping with his preparation: "It's 25 minutes of Mark O'Brien speaking frankly and often emotionally about his life … him being washed, getting outside. It was just invaluable. It was such an insight to him, and his poetry is throughout that documentary as well."

To simulate O'Brien's posture, Hawkes used a soccer-ball-sized piece of foam which he laid onto the left side of his back in order to curve his spine. Consequently, some of his organs began to migrate, and he was told by his chiropractor that as a result his spine lost movement. Nonetheless, he said it was "a minute amount of pain compared to what many disabled people face minute-to-minute." Hawkes also practiced dialing the phone using a "mouth stick". Of his preparation, Hawkes commented that "As an actor in the most general sense, I try to figure out what the story is and how my character helps tell it, as a whole and from moment to moment in the script. I wanted to make all of the physical work second nature so I wouldn’t have to think about it, to just make it part of me."

On casting Hunt as Cheryl, Lewin noted that "She really understood the paradox of being a middle-class soccer mom and, at the same time, having sex with strangers for a living...That kind of complex role needs a thinking actress." Hunt described meeting the real Cheryl Cohen-Greene as a valuable experience, explaining that "The moment I thought I actually understood this woman was when she used the term 'sex positive.' ... I thought it was pretty wonderful to get to embody that for the weeks that I was making the movie."

Hunt had few reservations in accepting a role which required multiple scenes of full nudity, saying "It's getting too late to not be brave, to not live my life fully, to not try to be an artist. Trivial things like how nice your hotel room is, or if you have to be naked for a while, they fade away." She revealed that her performance was further inspired by her feelings about body image and motherhood, citing in particular a scene in which Cheryl disrobes to enter a mikvah bath as one of her favorites: "One of the things I love about the movie is when the mikvah attendant says, ‘This is the body God has crafted for you.’ I want my daughter to get that message. Whatever shape she becomes—and she's sick of me saying this—I just say, 'Love your body.'"

== Themes ==
The Sessions is based upon Mark O'Brien's collection of personal essays in The Sun Magazine. The film and the essays both discuss the intersection of disability and sexuality in O'Brien's life. In the essays, O'Brien writes from a "crip/queer" perspective to refute his own experience of sexual prohibition as a disabled person. In some instances, disabled people are portrayed in film as incapable of having sex and expressing sexuality. The Sessions shows disability not within the context of rehabilitation, or through the lens of the medical model, but rather foregrounding Mark's sexual experiences as a disabled man.

O'Brien's article discusses the effect that societal beauty standards had on his self-image and his image of himself as a sexual being. The Sessions shows both internal and external factors that inhibit disabled people from being connected to their sexuality. It also explores the exclusion from their own bodies that severely disabled people can feel. O'Brien is both a disabled and a religious man, through whom the film treats the intersection of disability and religion as well. Since disability is often portrayed as a punishment for evil, for O'Brien this brings about a sense of shame that he is not deserving of sex or sexual pleasure.

One of the main topics of The Sessions is disability and sex surrogacy. Sometimes disabled people who have more pragmatic needs to achieve sexual pleasure seek out sexual assistance by means of sex surrogates or sex workers. The film depicts sex between Mark O'Brien and Cheryl Cohen-Greene, his sex therapist. The romantic bond that formulates between the two characters ensures that the concepts of disability and sex surrogacy are not seen by the audience as an emotionless act. The importance of location and disabled sex is also brought up in the film. For the first few sessions, Mark and Cheryl use an accessible home of Carmen, a disabled person Mark is interviewing for his essays about disability and sexuality. Sex requires particular settings for disabled people that can require specific technologies or settings to accommodate the person's needs.

Disability Studies Professor Rosemarie Garland-Thomson observes that the representation of disabled bodies can be juxtaposed with images of normality to make the disabled body more palpable for the audience. In The Sessions, disability, more specifically, disabled sex, is more easily comprehended by the audience because the visual language in which it is presented in is framed as normal because of the presence of the able bodied character. In the end, the film shows O'Brien as a disabled person who gradually becomes more comfortable with his own sexuality and eventually finds a partner, thus separating him from the other asexual representation of disabled people in film.

== Distribution and release ==
The Sessions premiered at the 2012 Sundance Film Festival as The Surrogate. According to Rachel Dodes, "the energy in the room was palpable" and the cast received several standing ovations. Fox Searchlight Pictures immediately acquired the film, paying $6 million for worldwide rights to it, a fee considered unusually high. The film has grossed $6,002,451 in North America and $3,135,887 in other territories, totaling $9,138,338 worldwide. For its Spanish-language edition, the film was renamed Seis sesiones de sexo ("Six Sessions of Sex").

== Reception ==
=== Critical response ===
The Sessions has an approval rating of 91% on review aggregator website Rotten Tomatoes, based on 198 reviews, and an average rating of 7.9/10. The website's critical consensus states, "Tender, funny, and touching, The Sessions provides an acting showcase for its talented stars and proves it's possible for Hollywood to produce a grown-up movie about sex". It also has a score of 79 out of 100 on Metacritic, based on 39 critics, indicating "generally favorable reviews".

=== Reviews ===
The Sessions was considered one of the 2012 Sundance breakout hits. John Hawkes received two prolonged standing ovations at the film's screening. It was praised by critics at the festival as "accessible, enjoyable, and light-hearted".

Linda Holmes, writing for NPR, called the film's performances "uniformly terrific". Variety's Peter Debruge said, "performances are paramount in a film like this, and Hawkes works some kind of miracle despite the self-evident physical limitations of the role." Todd McCarthy of The Hollywood Reporter said: "... most decisively, in audience terms, it argues in favor of living a full life, whatever one's personal constraints, of not being intimidated by societal or religious dogma or, most of all, by one's fears... Hawkes' full-bodied vocal and emotional characterization stands in stark contrast to his frail corporal presence. Hunt's performance may be physically bold but is equally marked by its maturity and composure." Kerry Weber of America Magazine criticized the depiction of the priest, saying: "His character constantly spouts platitudes that make him sound like his seminary training took place in the self-help section of Barnes & Noble." Weber also criticized the film for not adhering closely enough to the writings of the real-life Mark O'Brien. As such, the film does not give due attention to the complex subject matter. Weber says: "Unfortunately for the viewer, The Sessions doesn't make things quite complicated enough."

The film also received criticism for the fact that while Hunt spent much of her time onscreen completely naked, Hawkes always remained covered. Director Ben Lewin stated that he made this decision on the grounds that showing an erect penis in a film would have guaranteed it an NC-17 rating rather than an R, which would have severely limited the film's viewership. Hunt also defended the decision, but commented on her own performance that "Anything less than the amount of nudity in the film would be antithetical to the spirit of the movie."

=== Awards ===
The film received the Audience Award: U.S. Dramatic while the cast received a Special Jury Prize for Ensemble Acting at the 2012 Sundance Film Festival. Both Hawkes and Hunt received Independent Spirit Awards for their performances. The Sessions won the Audience Award at the San Sebastián International Film Festival. Ben Lewin received a nomination for Best International Direction at the 2nd AACTA International Awards, while Hawkes was nominated for Best International Actor.
