= 2nd AACTA International Awards =

Australian film and TV awards ceremony in 2013

- Date: 26 January 2013
- Site: Soho House; West Hollywood, California
- Hosted by: Russell Crowe

Highlights
- Best Film: Silver Linings Playbook
- Most awards: Silver Linings Playbook (3)
- Most nominations: Silver Linings Playbook (5)

The 2nd Australian Academy of Cinema and Television Arts International Awards (commonly known as the AACTA International Awards), were presented by the Australian Academy of Cinema and Television Arts (AACTA), a not for profit organisation whose aim is to identify, award, promote and celebrate Australia's greatest achievements in film and television. Awards were handed out for the best films of 2012 regardless of geography, and are the international counterpart to the awards for Australian films (held on 28 and 30 January). The ceremony took place at Soho House in West Hollywood, California on 26 January 2013. The event was hosted by Australian actor Russell Crowe.

The nominees were announced on 8 January 2013, with Silver Linings Playbook receiving the most nominations, with five. Silver Linings Playbook won the most awards with three, and were given to discretionary, non-competitive awards for Best Supporting Actor and Best Supporting Actress to Robert De Niro and Jacki Weaver, respectively.

== Winners and nominees ==
The nominees were determined by up to twelve jurors, which comprise writers, directors, actors and producers and people working in distribution and exhibition. Fifty films were selected to compete as early as May 2012, and by July or August the Jury was assembled to determine the nominees. The announcement was made on 8 January 2013, and Silver Linings Playbook received the most nominations with five, followed by Lincoln and Zero Dark Thirty, with four each. Silver Linings Playbook received the most wins with three, for Best Film, Best Direction and Best Actress. Additionally, two discretionary awards were given to the film for Best Supporting Actor and Best Supporting Actress for Robert De Niro and Jacki Weaver, respectively.

Winners are listed first and highlighted in boldface.

Best Film – International	Best Direction – International
**Silver Linings Playbook** – **Bruce Cohen, Donna Gigliotti, and Jonathan Gordon**; Argo – Ben Affleck, George Clooney, and Grant Heslov; Les Misérables – Tim Bevan, Eric Fellner, Debra Hayward, and Cameron Mackintosh; Life of Pi – Ang Lee, Gil Netter, and David Womark; Lincoln – Kathleen Kennedy and Steven Spielberg; Zero Dark Thirty – Kathryn Bigelow, Mark Boal, and Megan Ellison	**David O. Russell – Silver Linings Playbook**; Ben Affleck – Argo; Kathryn Bigelow – Zero Dark Thirty; Ben Lewin – The Sessions; Ang Lee – Life of Pi; Steven Spielberg – Lincoln
Best Actor – International	Best Actress – International
**Daniel Day-Lewis – Lincoln as Abraham Lincoln**; Bradley Cooper – Silver Linings Playbook as Patrick “Pat” Solitano, Jr.; John Hawkes – The Sessions as Mark O’Brien; Hugh Jackman – Les Misérables as Jean Valjean; Joaquin Phoenix – The Master as Freddie Quell; Denzel Washington – Flight as William “Whip” Whitaker, Sr.	**Jennifer Lawrence – Silver Linings Playbook as Tiffany Maxwell**; Jessica Chastain – Zero Dark Thirty as Maya; Marion Cotillard – Rust and Bone as Stéphanie; Nicole Kidman – The Paperboy as Charlotte Bless; Emmanuelle Riva – Amour as Anne Laurent; Naomi Watts – The Impossible as Maria Bennett
Best Screenplay – International
**Django Unchained – Quentin Tarantino**; Argo – Chris Terrio; Lincoln – Tony Kushner; The Master – Paul Thomas Anderson; Silver Linings Playbook – David O. Russell; Zero Dark Thirty – Mark Boal

=== Discretionary awards ===
- Best Supporting Actor: Robert De Niro – Silver Linings Playbook as Patrizio “Pat” Solitano, Jr.
- Best Supporting Actress: Jacki Weaver – Silver Linings Playbook as Dolores Solitano

== Films with multiple nominations and awards ==
The following films received multiple nominations.

- 5: Silver Linings Playbook
- 4: Lincoln and Zero Dark Thirty
- 3: Argo
- 2: Les Misérables and Life of Pi

The following film received multiple awards.

- 3: Silver Linings Playbook

== See also ==
- 2nd AACTA Awards
- 18th Critics’ Choice Awards
- 19th Screen Actors Guild Awards
- 66th British Academy Film Awards
- 70th Golden Globe Awards
- 85th Academy Awards
