= AACTA International Award for Best Direction =

Australian film award

Best Direction AACTA International Award
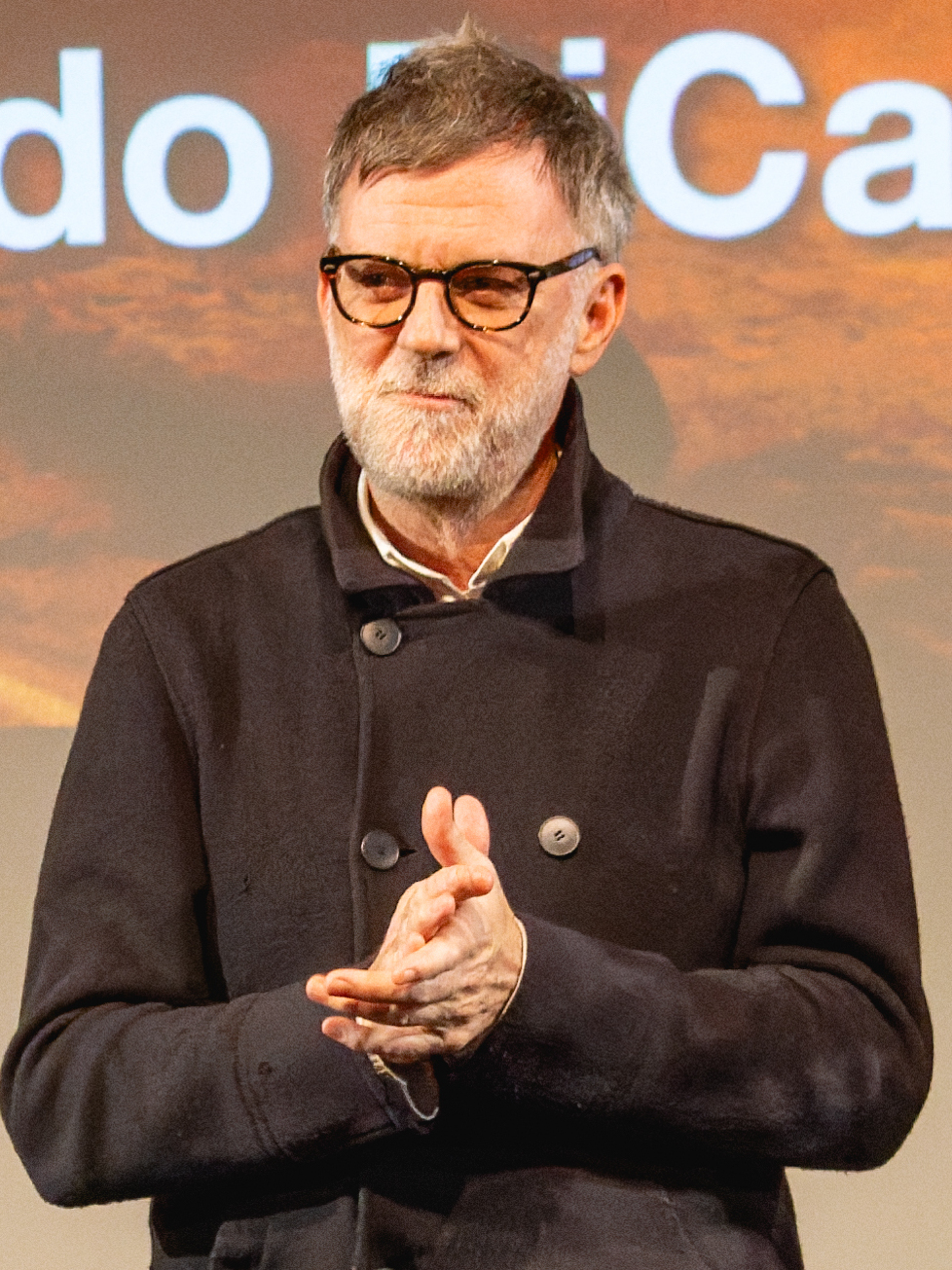
- The 2025 recipient: Paul Thomas Anderson
- Country: Australia
- Presented by: Australian Academy of Cinema and Television Arts (AACTA)
- First award: Michel Hazanavicius, The Artist (2011)
- Currently held by: Paul Thomas Anderson, One Battle After Another (2025)
- Website: https://www.aacta.org

The AACTA International Award for Best Direction is an award that is presented by the Australian Academy of Cinema and Television Arts (AACTA), to a director of a film made outside Australia. It was first handed out by the Academy after its establishment in 2011 by the Australian Film Institute (AFI). The winners and nominees for 2011 were determined by a jury.

== Winners and nominees ==
In the following table, the winner is marked in a separate colour, and highlighted in boldface; the nominees are those that are not highlighted or in boldface.

=== 2010s ===
Year	Director	Film title
**2011** (1st)
**2011** (1st)	**Michel Hazanavicius**	**The Artist**
**2011** (1st)	Nicolas Winding Refn	Drive
**2011** (1st)	Martin Scorsese	Hugo
**2011** (1st)	J. C. Chandor	Margin Call
**2011** (1st)	Lars von Trier	Melancholia
**2011** (1st)	Woody Allen	Midnight in Paris
**2011** (1st)	Terrence Malick	The Tree of Life
**2011** (1st)	Lynne Ramsay	We Need to Talk About Kevin
**2012** (2nd)
**2012** (2nd)	**David O. Russell**	**Silver Linings Playbook**
**2012** (2nd)	Ben Affleck	Argo
**2012** (2nd)	Ang Lee	Life of Pi
**2012** (2nd)	Steven Spielberg	Lincoln
**2012** (2nd)	Ben Lewin	The Sessions
**2012** (2nd)	Kathryn Bigelow	Zero Dark Thirty
**2013** (3rd)
**2013** (3rd)	**Alfonso Cuarón**	**Gravity**
**2013** (3rd)	Steve McQueen	12 Years a Slave
**2013** (3rd)	David O. Russell	American Hustle
**2013** (3rd)	Paul Greengrass	Captain Phillips
**2013** (3rd)	Baz Luhrmann	The Great Gatsby
**2014** (4th)
**2014** (4th)	**Alejandro G. Iñárritu**	**Birdman or (The Unexpected Virtue of Ignorance)**
**2014** (4th)	Richard Linklater	Boyhood
**2014** (4th)	Wes Anderson	The Grand Budapest Hotel
**2014** (4th)	Morten Tyldum	The Imitation Game
**2014** (4th)	Damien Chazelle	Whiplash
**2015** (5th)
**2015** (5th)	**George Miller**	**Mad Max: Fury Road**
**2015** (5th)	Adam McKay	The Big Short
**2015** (5th)	Todd Haynes	Carol
**2015** (5th)	Ridley Scott	The Martian
**2015** (5th)	Alejandro G. Iñárritu	The Revenant
**2016** (6th)
**2016** (6th)	**Mel Gibson**	**Hacksaw Ridge**
**2016** (6th)	Denis Villeneuve	Arrival
**2016** (6th)	Damien Chazelle	La La Land
**2016** (6th)	Garth Davis	Lion
**2016** (6th)	Kenneth Lonergan	Manchester by the Sea
**2017** (7th)
**2017** (7th)	**Christopher Nolan**	**Dunkirk**
**2017** (7th)	Luca Guadagnino	Call Me by Your Name
**2017** (7th)	Craig Gillespie	I, Tonya
**2017** (7th)	Greta Gerwig	Lady Bird
**2017** (7th)	Guillermo del Toro	The Shape of Water
**2018** (8th)
**2018** (8th)	**Alfonso Cuarón**	**Roma**
**2018** (8th)	Bradley Cooper	A Star Is Born
**2018** (8th)	Spike Lee	BlacKkKlansman
**2018** (8th)	Yorgos Lanthimos	The Favourite
**2018** (8th)	Warwick Thornton	Sweet Country
**2019** (9th)
**2019** (9th)	**Quentin Tarantino**	**Once Upon a Time in Hollywood**
**2019** (9th)	Sam Mendes	1917
**2019** (9th)	Martin Scorsese	The Irishman
**2019** (9th)	Todd Phillips	Joker
**2019** (9th)	Bong Joon-ho	Parasite

=== 2020s ===
Year	Director	Film title
**2020** (10th)
**2020** (10th)	**Chloé Zhao**	**Nomadland**
**2020** (10th)	David Fincher	Mank
**2020** (10th)	Emerald Fennell	Promising Young Woman
**2020** (10th)	Pete Docter	Soul
**2020** (10th)	Aaron Sorkin	The Trial of the Chicago 7
**2021** (11th)
**2021** (11th)	**Denis Villeneuve**	**Dune**
**2021** (11th)	Kenneth Branagh	Belfast
**2021** (11th)	Paul Thomas Anderson	Licorice Pizza
**2021** (11th)	Justin Kurzel	Nitram
**2021** (11th)	Jane Campion	The Power of the Dog
**2022** (12th)
**2022** (12th)	**Baz Luhrmann**	**Elvis**
**2022** (12th)	James Cameron	Avatar: The Way of Water
**2022** (12th)	Martin McDonagh	The Banshees of Inisherin
**2022** (12th)	Daniel Kwan and Daniel Scheinert	Everything Everywhere All at Once
**2022** (12th)	Steven Spielberg	The Fabelmans
**2023** (13th)
**2023** (13th)	**Christopher Nolan**	**Oppenheimer**
**2023** (13th)	Bradley Cooper	Maestro
**2023** (13th)	Greta Gerwig	Barbie
**2023** (13th)	Yorgos Lanthimos	Poor Things
**2023** (13th)	Martin Scorsese	Killers of the Flower Moon
**2024** (14th)
**2024** (14th)	**Michael Gracey**	**Better Man**
**2024** (14th)	Jacques Audiard	Emilia Pérez
**2024** (14th)	Brady Corbet	The Brutalist
**2024** (14th)	George Miller	Furiosa: A Mad Max Saga
**2024** (14th)	Denis Villeneuve	Dune: Part Two
**2025** (15th)
**2025** (15th)	**Paul Thomas Anderson**	**One Battle After Another**
**2025** (15th)	Ryan Coogler	Sinners
**2025** (15th)	Guillermo del Toro	Frankenstein
**2025** (15th)	Josh Safdie	Marty Supreme
**2025** (15th)	Chloé Zhao	Hamnet

== See also ==
- AACTA Awards
- AACTA Award for Best Direction
