= Breathing Lessons: The Life and Work of Mark O'Brien =

1996 film

- Film poster
- Directed by: Jessica Yu
- Written by: Jessica Yu
- Produced by: Jessica Yu
- Starring: Mark O'Brien
- Cinematography: Shana Hagan
- Edited by: Jessica Yu
- Production companies: Inscrutable Films; Pacific News Service
- Distributed by: Fanlight Productions
- Release date: 1996
- Running time: 35 minutes
- Country: United States
- Language: English

Breathing Lessons: The Life and Work of Mark O'Brien is a 1996 American short documentary film directed by Jessica Yu.

== Film ==
It won an Oscar at the 69th Academy Awards in 1997 for Documentary Short Subject.

Mark O'Brien was a journalist and poet who lived in Berkeley, California. The documentary explored his spiritual struggle coping with his disability; he had to use an iron lung much of the time due to childhood polio. O'Brien died on July 4, 1999, from post-polio syndrome.

== Cast ==
- Mark O'Brien as Himself
- Elizabeth Duvall as Herself
- Ian Berzon as Himself
- Jonathan Rhein as Himself
