= Jessica Yu =

American film director, writer and producer

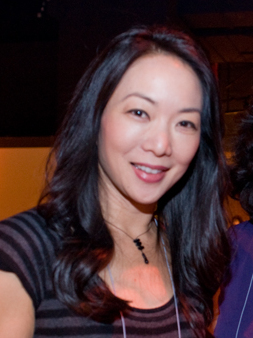
- Yu in 2010
- Education: Yale University
- Occupations: Director, writer, producer, film editor
- Years active: 1993–present
- Spouse: Mark Salzman
- Children: 2
- Website: www.jessicayu.net

Jessica Yu (Chinese: 虞琳敏; pinyin: Yú Línmǐn) is an American director, writer, producer, and film editor. She has directed documentary films, dramatic films, and television shows.

Yu won the Academy Award for Best Documentary Short Subject in 1997 for Breathing Lessons: The Life and Work of Mark O'Brien (1996). Yu's film Last Call at the Oasis (2012) is based upon Alex Prud'homme's Ripple Effect. Her more recent films have been: Misconception (2014), ForEveryone.Net (2016), a documentary film about the inventor of the World Wide Web, Sir Tim Berners-Lee, and a Netflix comedy Maria Bamford: Old Baby (2017). In 2019, Yu was nominated for an Emmy Award for "Outstanding Direction for a Limited Series, Movie, or Dramatic Special" for the Fosse/Verdon episode "Glory".

== Early life and education ==
Yu grew up in Los Altos Hills, California. Her father, Dr. John Kou-ping Yu, an oncologist, was born in Shanghai. Her mother, Connie Young Yu, writer and historian, is a third-generation Californian.

Yu graduated from Gunn High School in Palo Alto. She was a reporter for the school newspaper, The Oracle.

She went on to attend Yale University, where she was a two-time NCAA All-American and three-time All-Ivy in fencing. As a world-class foilist, she was a member of the Junior World Team and the United States national team at the World Championships and World University Games. Yu graduated from Yale University in 1987 summa cum laude, Phi Beta Kappa, with a bachelor's degree in English.

== Career ==
After graduation, Yu thought of pursuing law school like her peers. However, her father discouraged her from doing so. She discovered film production while searching for a job that allowed flexible hours to allow her to compete in fencing. She started as a production assistant in 1989 on a few commercials, where she got to arrange frozen noodles on forks and re-park cars. When she started working in documentary, she became further intrigued by the process. Yu refused to attend film school and gained her film education on the job. She focuses on making documentaries but says that one day she'd love to make a fully animated comedy feature. The opportunity to make film is a random occurrence for Yu. Her documentary films present worldwide issues that people face every day and allow the subjects to speak for themselves as much as possible. She is adamant that story should come before politics. Her films intend to inform the general public to incite people to become active in everyday issues such as water conservation and regulation. When not making documentaries and feature films, Yu spends time directing television shows.

=== 1990s ===
Yu began her career in 1993 with her short Sour Death Balls, a silent black-and-white montage of assorted subjects' reactions to blindingly bitter candy, which was shot on an old school Bell & Howell wind-up camera. She got her inspirations from daily interactions in her life, i.e. when a child offered local people sour candy. Yu sent the short film to film festivals, and it became her first feature at the Telluride Film Festival in 1993. Yu made her first documentary, Men of Reenaction (1994), which explores the extremes of people searching for authenticity through Civil War reenacting.

Her most famous work was her Academy Award-winning Breathing Lessons: The Life and Work of Mark O’Brien. The documentary short features Berkeley writer Mark O'Brien, a disabled poet with an iron lung. His editor at the Pacific News Service, Sandy Close, introduced the pair and suggested that a film be made. It debuted at the 1996 Sundance Film Festival and won several honors, including the International Documentary Association Achievement Award for Best Documentary, before the Academy Awards.

Yu's 1998 HBO documentary The Living Museum, which follows Creedmoor Psychiatric Center patient Issa Ibrahim, was nominated for the Grand Jury Prize at the 1999 Sundance Film Festival.

=== 2000s ===
In the 2000s, Yu's chance to work in episodic TV came when she received an invitation to apprentice at John Wells Productions as the first participant of their director diversity program. Shadowing directors, Yu sensed she was a guinea pig. “If you screw this up,” she told herself, “they’ll never let another woman of color from documentaries do this again.” While working for Wells' production company, she began directing in television for shows like Grey's Anatomy and The West Wing. On her first directorial assignment, an episode of The West Wing, Yu was heartened that Wells encouraged her stylistic input. “He made a point of saying, ‘You should bring your own ideas to the table,’ rather than just follow prescribed formula.” So she decided to open with a series of mood-establishing low, wide-angle shots to signal the calm before the gathering storm.

She directed a sport comedy film, Ping Pong Playa (2007), that explored Asian family culture through a Chinese ping pong playing son that is trying to prove himself to his family. Her producer friends Joan Huang and Jeff Guo approached her with the idea of working on a comedy together. They felt the time was right to have an obnoxious Asian American character on the screen. Yu and her comrades felt that Asian American cinema had plenty of good dramas and wanted to fill the void of superficial comedy. She tried to bring the same loose hand and adaptability she used for documentaries to scripted material. Her approach to Ping Pong Playa was to “have a lighter touch, especially with actors” to give them a sense of freedom.

=== 2010s ===
In her later documentaries such as Last Call at The Oasis (2011) and Misconception (2014), Yu focused on capturing the big picture and understanding how these issues intertwined with other aspects of life such as climate, population, and the environment. Last Call at The Oasis addresses the water crisis in the United States, and working on the film made her consider the impact of the crisis on her children and their children. This project became more personal to Yu and compelled her to complete it. It took six months of research prior to filming, as Yu wanted to create the big picture of the facts and threats of the water crisis in the domestic United States.

Last Call at the Oasis inspired Yu to direct her 2014 documentary Misconception, which paints the population issues from a person-to-person point of view. While filming Last Call at the Oasis people questioned the purpose of acting on water conservation because they cannot control the population growth affecting it. Her main goal is to take this topic and tie with emotionally, entertaining, and interesting stories.

The majority of her work after 2015 has been focused on television production and directing. For Netflix, she directed episodes of the dramas 13 Reasons Why and Hollywood and did Maria Bamford's comedy special Old Baby.

=== 2020s ===
Jessica's work in the 2020s includes directing a number of television drama series. This Is Us (Don't Let Me Keep You, 2021), The Morning Show (Kill the Fatted Calf, 2021), In Treatment (Brooke, Laila, Colins, Eladio, 2021).

== Personal life ==
Yu is married to author Mark Salzman. They and their daughters, Ava and Esme, live in Los Angeles.

Jessica has an older sister, Jennifer Yu, a technical publications manager, and a younger brother, Martin Yu, an actor.

== Filmography ==
=== Short films ===
Year	Title	Director	Writer	Producer	Editor
1990	Rose Kennedy: A Life to Remember	No	No	Associate	No
1993	Sour Deaths Balls	Yes	No	No	No
1996	Breathing Lessons: The Life and Work of Mark O'Brien	Yes	Yes	Yes	Yes
1998	Better Late	Yes	Yes	No	Yes
2009	The Kinda Sutra	Yes	No	No	No
2012	Meet Mr. Toilet	Yes	No	Yes	No
2012	Focus Forward: Short Films, Big Ideas	Yes	No	No	No
2014	We the Economy: 20 Short Films, Big Ideas	Yes	No	No	No
2016	James Turrell: You Who Look	Yes	No	No	No
2016	ForEveryone.Net	Yes	Yes	Yes	No

=== Feature film ===
Year	Title	Director	Writer	Producer	Editor
1994	The Conductor	Yes	No	Yes	No
1996	Men of Reenaction	Yes	Yes	No	Yes
1998	The Living Museum	Yes	Yes	No	Yes
2004	In the Realms of the Unreal	Yes	Yes	Yes	Yes
2007	Protagonist	Yes	Yes	Yes	Yes
2007	Ping Pong Playa	Yes	Yes	No	No
2012	Last Call at the Oasis	Yes	Yes	Yes	No
2013	The Guide	Yes	No	No	Yes
2014	Misconception	Yes	No	No	No
2017	Maria Bamford: Old Baby	Yes	No	No	No
2023	Quiz Lady	Yes	No	No	No
2025	A Very Jonas Christmas Movie	Yes	No	No	No

Associate producer

- Maya Lin: A Strong Clear Vision (1994)

Script advisor

- Picture Bride (1995)

=== TV series ===
Year	Title	Notes
2001–2004	The West Wing	3 episodes
2002	ER	Episode "Bygones"
2003	The Guardian	Episode "You Belong to Me"
2003	Mister Sterling	Episode "The Sins of the Father"
2003	The Lyon's Den	Episode "Ex"
2004	American Dreams	Episode "Real-to-Reel"
2006–2011	Grey's Anatomy	6 episodes
2012	Scandal	Episode "Blown Away"
2012–2014	Parenthood	4 episodes
2015–2017	American Crime	3 episodes
2016	Castle	2 episodes
2016	Lady Dynamite	Episode "Mein Ramp"
2016	Pure Genius	Episode "You Must Remember This"
2017	Ten Days in the Valley	Episode "Day 4: Below the Line"
2017–2019	13 Reasons Why	6 episodes Also consulting producer (4 episodes)
2018	I'm Dying Up Here	Episode "Deathbed Confessions"
2018	The Affair	Episode "405"
2018	Sorry for Your Loss	Episode "Jackie O. and Courtney Love"
2018–2019	Billions	2 episodes
2019	The Rookie	Episode "Flesh and Blood"
2019	Fosse/Verdon	Episode "Glory"
2019	Bluff City Law	Also executive producer; Episode "Pilot"
2019	This Is Us	3 episodes
2019	Stumptown	Episode "The Other Woman"
2020	Hollywood	Episode "A Hollywood Ending"
2020	Ratched	Episode "Got No Strings"
2021	Walker	Episode "Pilot"
2021	This Is Us	Episode "The Music and the Mirror"
2021	The Morning Show	Episode "Kill the Fatted Calf"
2022	This Is Us	Episode "Don't Let Me Keep You"
2023	Citadel	2 episodes
2023	American Horror Story: Delicate	Episode: "Multiple Thy Pain"
2024–present	Only Murders in the Building	4 episodes

== Awards and nominations ==
Year	Award	Category	Work	Result
1995	International Documentary Association	IDA Award	89 mm od Europy	Won
1996	International Documentary Association	IDA Award	Breathing Lessons: The Life and Work of Mark O'Brien	Won
1997	Academy Awards	Best Documentary Short Subject	Breathing Lessons: The Life and Work of Mark O'Brien	Won
1997	Shorts International Film Festival	Best Short Film	Breathing Lessons: The Life and Work of Mark O'Brien	Won
1997	Asian American International Film Festival	Asian Media Award	Breathing Lessons: The Life and Work of Mark O'Brien	Won
1999	Sundance Film Festival	Grand Jury Prize: Documentary	The Living Museum	Nominated
2002	Online Film & Television Association	OFTA Television Award: Best Direction in a Drama Series	The West Wing	Nominated
2004	Gotham Awards	Best Documentary	In the Realms of the Unreal	Nominated
2004	Ojai Film Festival	Best Documentary Feature	In the Realms of the Unreal	Won
2004	Sundance Film Festival	Grand Jury Prize: Documentary	In the Realms of the Unreal	Nominated
2004	Vancouver International Film Festival	Best Documentary Feature	In the Realms of the Unreal	Won
2005	Writers Guild of America, USA	Documentary Screenplay Award	In the Realms of the Unreal	Nominated
2006	Primetime Emmy Awards	Exceptional Merit in Nonfiction Filmmaking	In the Realms of the Unreal	Nominated
2007	Sundance Film Festival	Grand Jury Prize: Documentary	Protagonist	Nominated
2007	Yamagata International Documentary Film Festival	Robert and Frances Flaherty Prize	Protagonist	Nominated
2012	Tokyo International Film Festival	Earth Grand Prix	Last Call at the Oasis	Nominated
2012	SXSW Film Festival	Audience Award	Last Call at the Oasis	Nominated
2013	Aspen Shortsfest	Audience Recognition	The Guide	Won
2013	Hamburg International Short Film Festival	Friese Award	Sour Death Balls	Nominated
2014	Tribeca Film Festival	Best Documentary Feature	Misconception	Nominated
2019	Primetime Emmy Awards	Outstanding Directing for a Limited Series, Movie or a Dramatic Special	Fosse/Verdon (for "Glory")	Nominated
