= Misconception (film) =

- Directed by: Jessica Yu
- Written by: Jessica Yu
- Music by: Nick Urata
- Production company: Participant Media
- Release date: April 21, 2014
- Running time: 93 minutes
- Country: United States
- Language: English

Misconception is a 2014 American documentary film directed by Jessica Yu about population growth. It reveals a world of anti-abortion centers. The film has been reviewed on Slant Magazine and TheWrap.

== Reception ==
In the Los Angeles Times, Gary Goldstein wrote:

The film is divided into three chapters. In the first, a Chinese man nearing 30 searches for a suitable wife in a nation whose one-child policy, which began in the late 1970s and ended at the start of 2016, unexpectedly caused a deficit of about 30 million girls. Part two follows Canadian antiabortion activist Denise Mountenay as she addresses the United Nations on behalf of her deep-rooted cause.

The third and most potent chapter spotlights Gladys Kalibbala, a heroic Ugandan journalist exploring the vast numbers of lost, abandoned or misplaced children in a populous country with the world’s third-highest birthrate. This last section serves as a kind of "in-the-trenches" rebuttal to Mountenay’s more ideologically-based campaign...

Misconception proves a smart, vital and absorbing portrait.
