= Ben Lewin =

Australian filmmaker (born 1946)

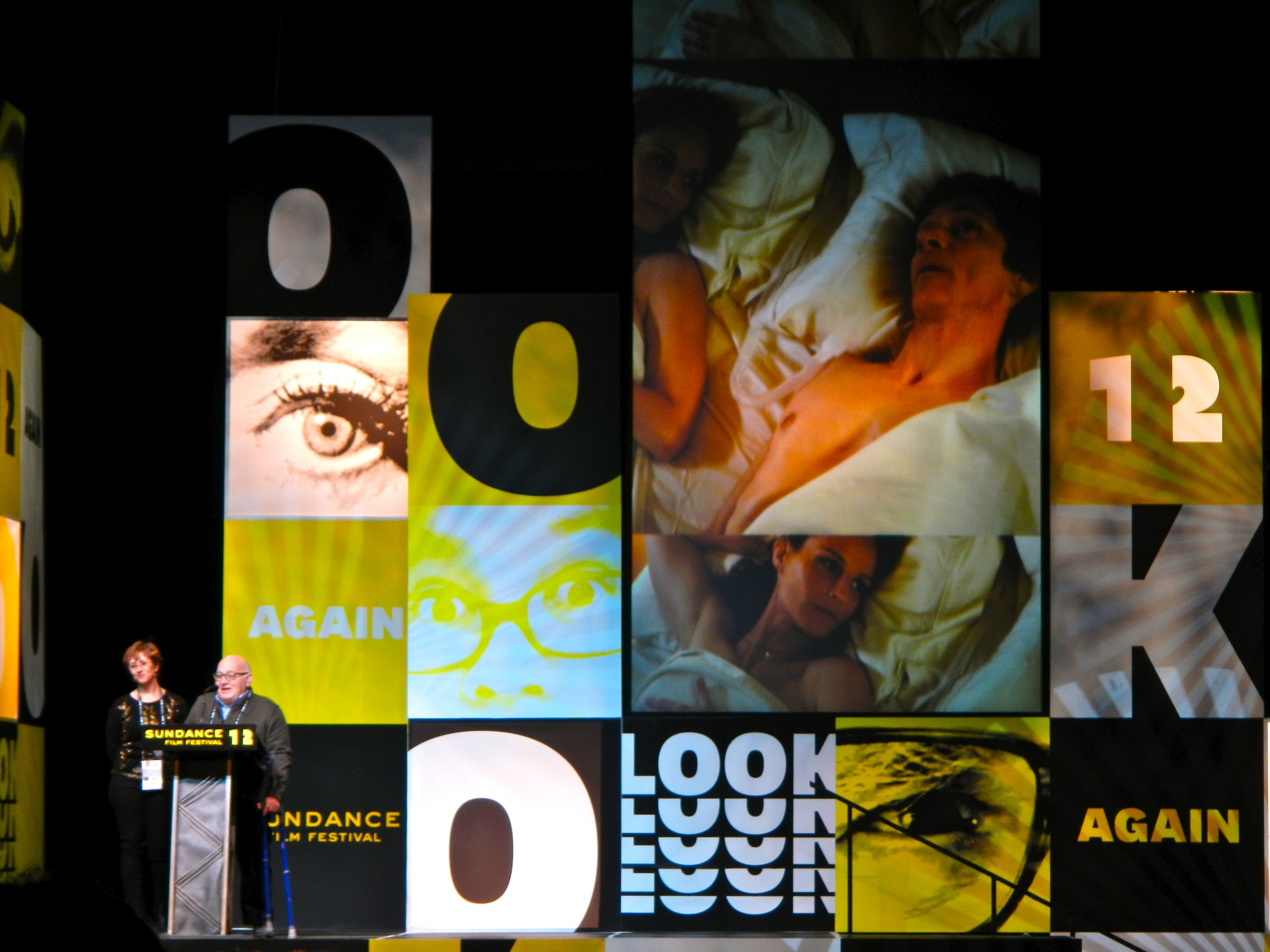
- With Judi Levine at Sundance Film Festival
- Born: 1946 (age 79–80); Poland
- Occupations: Director, screenwriter

Ben Lewin (born 1946) is an Australian film and television director. He has written the screenplays for a number of his films.

== Early life and education ==
Ben Lewin was born in Poland. As a child, he emigrated with his family to Melbourne, Australia. At the age of six, he contracted polio, which resulted in his having to use crutches for the rest of his life. Lewin attended the University of Melbourne where he studied law, and in 1969 contributed photographic series to the book Spilt Image, produced by the Melbourne University Photography Club, and in the publication he is noted as having "considerable" qualifications for its conception and production with co-editor John Julian:

He has long been an accomplished photographer, and a prolific writer with a fine reputation around the University for his charming, if bizarre stories. His writing and photography suggest a tough, almost cynical rationality, oddly combined with a very natural and spontaneous appreciation of the comic, the eccentric, and the human. These attitudes make his behaviour quite unpredictable, but result in an imaginative approach to art.

In 1971, he left his job as a barrister in Australia after being given a scholarship to study film at National Film and Television School in England. After school, Lewin remained in England, where he worked in television.

== Work in film ==
Lewin has since made feature films in Australia, England, France, and America. Some of his notable films are The Dunera Boys (1985), Georgia (1988), and The Favour, the Watch and the Very Big Fish (1991).

Lewin gained further notice for writing and directing the romantic comedy film Lucky Break (1994), released outside of Australia as Paperback Romance. It was a critical success in Australia and launched/revived the careers of Gia Carides and Rebecca Gibney, the latter of whom was nominated for the AACTA Award for Best Supporting Actress by the Australian Film Institute for her performance in the film.

He wrote and directed The Sessions (2012), adapted from an essay by American poet Mark O'Brien about working with a sex surrogate partner to deal with his paralysis.

Lewin also directed the films Please Stand By (2017), The Catcher Was a Spy (2018), and Falling for Figaro (2021); for this last, he wrote the screenplay with Allen Palmer.
