= The Sun (magazine) =

American monthly magazine

- Issue 348, December 2004 photograph by Kevin Bubriski
- Editor: Sy Safransky
- Categories: Literature, photography
- Frequency: Monthly
- First issue: 1974
- Company: Sun Publishing Company
- Country: United States
- Based in: Chapel Hill, North Carolina
- Language: English
- Website: thesunmagazine.org
- ISSN: 0744-9666

The Sun is a magazine based in Chapel Hill, North Carolina. The overall goal for the publication, as stated by editor and co-founder, Sy Safransky, is to create a feeling of connection between contributors and readers.

== History ==
In 1974, Sy Safransky started the magazine with co-founder, Mike Mathers, who left after 18 months. The partners borrowed $50 and solicited writing by friends and family for the first issue. Safransky typed up the material, Mathers drew illustrations, and it was printed on a copy machine. The first issue was titled the Chapel Hill Sun and was sold for $0.25 each. The title was later changed to The Sun. Readership was about 1000 for roughly the first decade and has now increased to more than 70,000.

Safransky describes the magazine as one "that honors the mystery at the heart of existence." In 1990, when readership reached roughly 10,000, Safransky dropped ads from the magazine and transformed it into a reader-supported publication. Safransky believes this has "allowed for an uncommon atmosphere of intimacy in our pages."

== Format ==
The Sun's format features a lengthy interview with a “deep thinker” at the front of each issue, followed by fiction, nonfiction, poetry, and photography. In the “Readers Write” section, readers are invited to contribute reflections on a different theme for each issue.

== Anthologies ==
- A Bell Ringing in the Empty Sky: The Best of the Sun, Volume I by Sy Safransky (1985)
- A Bell Ringing in the Empty Sky: The Best of the Sun, Volume II by Sy Safransky (1985)
- Four in the Morning: Essays by Sy Safransky (1993)
- Stubborn Light: The Best of the Sun, Volume III by Sy Safransky (2000)
- The Mysterious Life of the Heart: Writing from The Sun about Passion, Longing, and Love by Sy Safransky, Tim McKee, and Andrew Snee (2009)
- Paper Lanterns: More Quotations from the Back Pages of The Sun by Sy Safransky, Tim McKee and Andrew Snee (2011)
- Sunbeams: A Book of Quotations Revised Edition by Sy Safransky (2012)
