= Cheryl Cohen-Greene =

American sex surrogate partner, speaker, and author

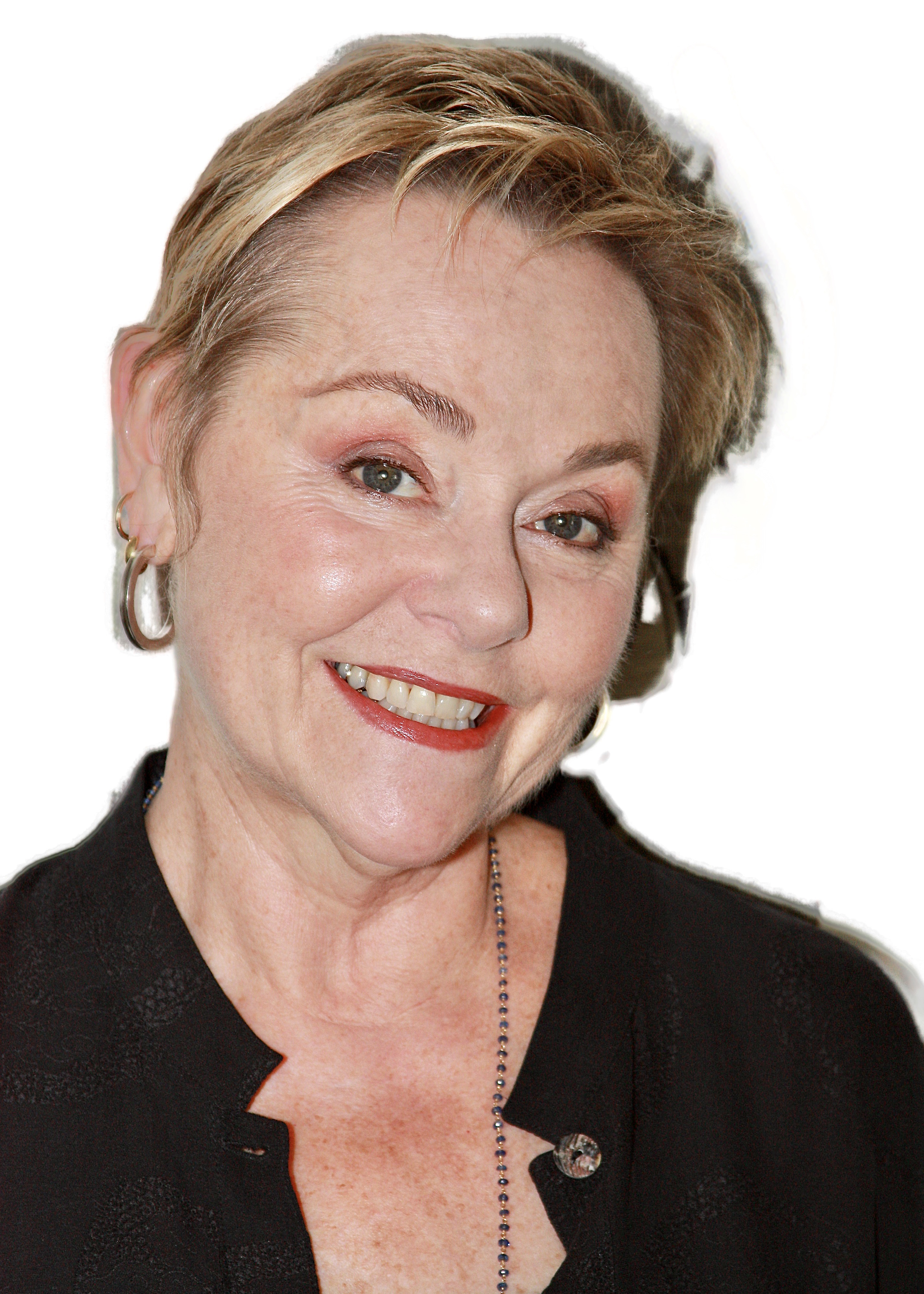
- Born: Cheryl Theriault; September 9, 1944 (age 82); Salem, Massachusetts, U.S.
- Occupations: Sex surrogate partner, speaker, author
- Years active: Since 1973
- Children: 2

Cheryl Cohen-Greene (born Cheryl Theriault, September 9, 1944) is an American sexual surrogate partner, speaker, and author. She is known for her work with American poet Mark O'Brien in 1986, who wrote about their process.

She was portrayed in the film The Sessions by Helen Hunt, who received an Academy Award nomination for her performance. In 2012, Cohen Greene released her memoir, titled An Intimate Life: Sex, Love, and My Journey as a Surrogate Partner.

== Personal life ==
Cheryl Theriault was raised in Salem, Massachusetts, the daughter of Virginia (née Cote 1924–2002) and Robert Theriault (1921–2012). She has two brothers, David, a dentist, and Peter, an artist. Both her parents were of French Canadian descent.

She was raised Roman Catholic and converted to Judaism after marrying her first husband, Michael Cohen, in 1964. They had an open marriage. She has a son, Allan, and a daughter, Jessica, from her first marriage, and several grandchildren.

After a divorce, she later married again, Bob Greene. He is a Vietnam war veteran, former client, and retired postal worker.

She began working as a sex surrogate partner in 1973 and also worked as a nude artist's model. She is a breast cancer and lymphoma survivor. She has dealt with dyslexia.

After Cohen-Greene graduated from Salem High School, she attended the Institute for Advanced Study of Human Sexuality in San Francisco.

== Career ==
Cohen-Greene first thought of becoming a sex surrogate partner after reading Surrogate Wife: The Story of a Masters & Johnson Sexual Therapist and the Nine Cases She Treated by Valerie Scott. In 1973, she took San Francisco Sex Information's (SFSI) training, and was a member of their training staff for 20 years. She studied the work of Masters and Johnson, and works with many of the San Francisco Bay Area's premiere sex therapists.

She is a certified Clinical Sexologist and a sex surrogate partner. Her official title is Surrogate Partner Therapist. She is a member of IPSA (International Professional Surrogates Association). In October 2004 she received her 'Doctorate in Human Sexuality' from the Institute for Advanced Study of Human Sexuality in San Francisco.

She has said about her profession: "People have asked me over the years, 'How do you work with people who are differently abled?' I always say, it's not hard for me. I just have to learn what their special needs are."

She has appeared on such TV shows as Larry King Live, the Joy Behar Show and The Jeff Probst Show to discuss her profession.

The National Geographic show Taboo's episode "Forbidden Love" (Season 7, Episode 6, first aired 2011) featured her in one of its segments.

Also, the Discovery Fit & Health documentary My Sex Surrogate, first aired in 2013, follows a woman and a man as they each work with a sex surrogate. She was the surrogate who worked with the man.
