= Mark O'Brien (poet) =

American disabled journalist and poet (1949–1999)

- Mark O'Brien
- Born: July 31, 1949; Boston, Massachusetts, U.S.
- Died: July 4, 1999 (aged 49); Berkeley, California, U.S.
- Occupations: Poet; journalist; activist

Mark O'Brien (July 31, 1949 – July 4, 1999) was an American journalist, poet, and disability rights advocate. He has been the subject of two films: documentary Breathing Lessons: The Life and Work of Mark O'Brien (1996), and drama The Sessions (2012). In the drama, he was portrayed by John Hawkes. The film won the audience award in the U.S. Dramatic category at the Sundance Film Festival in 2012.

The Sessions was based on his essay, "On Seeing a Sex Surrogate", which appeared in the Sun magazine in 1990. O'Brien was seeing Cheryl Cohen-Greene, a surrogate partner. They remained friends until his death.

== Life and career ==
O'Brien contracted polio as a child in 1955. The disease resulted in nerve damage and paralysis, and O'Brien required an iron lung to survive.

In the iron lung he attended UC Berkeley, and became a writer, produced both poetry and journal articles. He also became an advocate for disabled people. He co-founded a small publishing house, Lemonade Factory, dedicated to poetry written by people with disabilities. He was featured in two segments of the radio program "This American Life", in which he spoke about the occasional opportunities he had to leave the iron lung for short periods of time, trying to find love and sex.

O'Brien was the author of several volumes of poetry, including Breathing, and an autobiography entitled, How I Became a Human Being: A Disabled Man’s Quest for Independence, written with Gillian Kendall.

At the age of thirty-eight, O'Brien began seeing a sex surrogate as he wanted to lose his virginity. He wrote an essay about his process of learning about sex and love. This was later adapted as the 2012 posthumous film "The Sessions", which also explored his later meeting with Susan Fernbach, who became his life partner. The professional sex surrogate was Cheryl Cohen-Greene. They remained friends until his death.

== Education ==
O'Brien received a bachelor's degree in English literature and a master's degree in journalism, both from the University of California, Berkeley.
