= List of awards and nominations received by Kate Hudson =

Kate Hudson awards and nominations
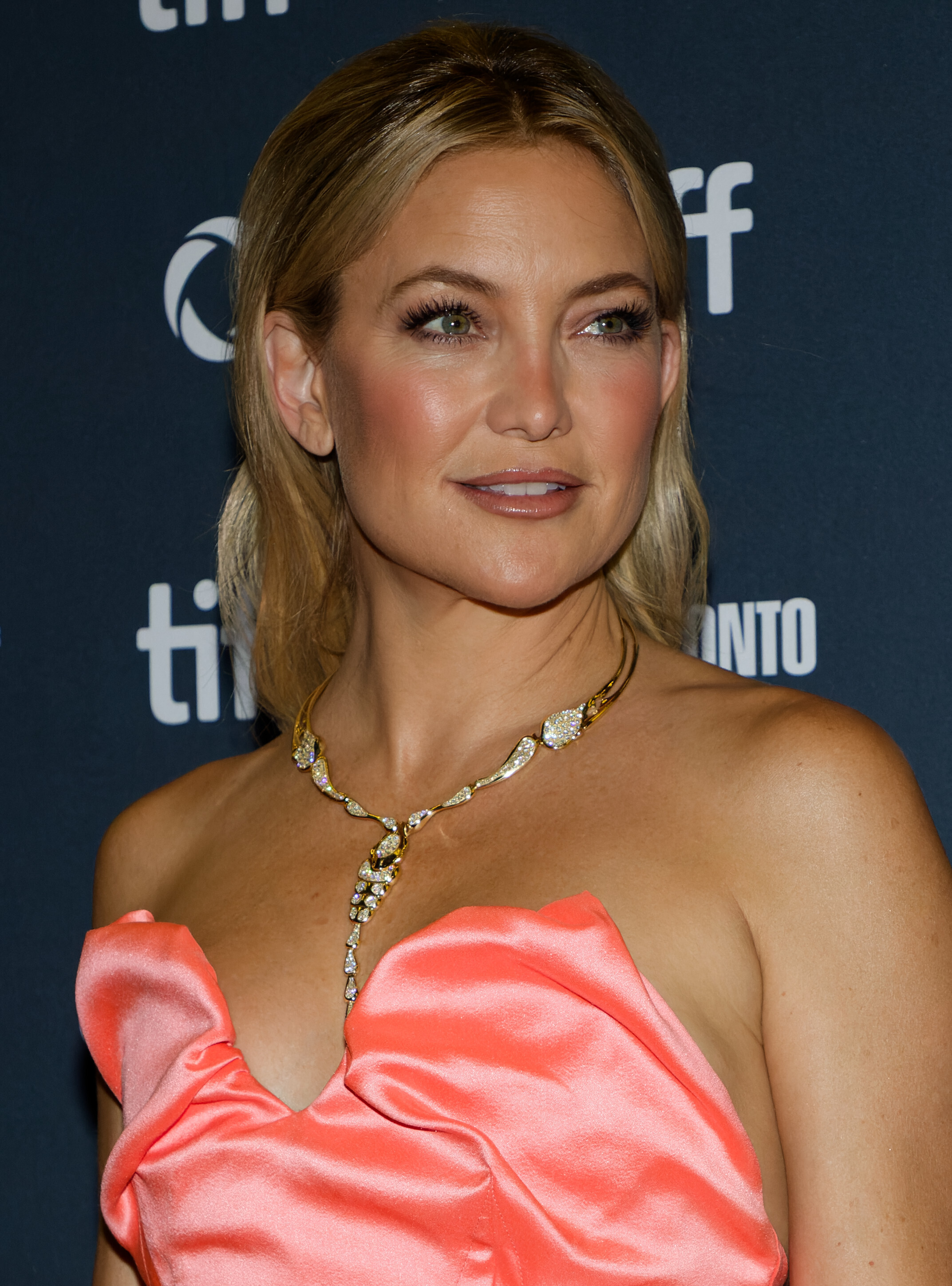
- Hudson in 2024
Awards and nominations
Award	Wins	Nominations
Academy Awards	0	2
Actor Awards	0	4
BAFTA Awards	0	2
Critics' Choice Awards	1	2
Golden Globes	1	3

Totals (Note: Certain award groups do not simply award one winner. They acknowledge several different recipients, have runners-up, and have third place. Since this is a specific recognition and is different from losing an award, runner-up mentions are considered wins in this award tally. For simplification and to avoid errors, each award in this list has been presumed to have had a prior nomination.)
- Wins: 22
- Nominations: 48

American actress Kate Hudson has received various awards and nominations throughout her career. In 2000, her role as Penny Lane in Cameron Crowe's drama film Almost Famous earned her worldwide recognition and critical plaudits, including nominations for an Academy Award, a Golden Globe Award, a Satellite Award, a Critics' Choice Award and a Screen Actors Guild Award for Best Supporting Actress and a BAFTA Award for Best Actress; winning the Golden Globe and Satellite Award. In 2012, her role in the film was recognized as the second-best performance by an actress in a supporting role of the 2000s decade by the Awards Circuit Community.

Hudson has also received recognition for her roles in the films: How to Lose a Guy in 10 Days, Alex & Emma (both 2003), Raising Helen (2004), You, Me and Dupree (2006), Fool's Gold, My Best Friend's Girl (both 2008), Bride Wars, Nine (both 2009), Something Borrowed (2011), Wish I Was Here (2014), Mother's Day (2016), and Music (2021); with the latter garnering controversy around its misinterpretation of the autism community and earned both Hudson and her co-star Maddie Ziegler Golden Raspberry Awards for Worst Actress and Worst Supporting Actress, respectively. Simultaneously, Hudson garnered her second Golden Globe nomination for the same role. Her role in Nine earned Hudson and her co-stars the Satellite Award for Best Cast - Motion Picture and a SAG Award nomination in the same category. For her acclaimed work in Song Sung Blue (2025), Hudson received nominations for an Academy Award, Actor Award, BAFTA Award and Golden Globe Award in the Best Actress category.

== Major associations ==
=== Academy Awards ===
Year	Category	Nominated work	Result	Ref.
2001	Best Supporting Actress	Almost Famous	Nominated	
2026	Best Actress	Song Sung Blue	Nominated	

=== Actor Awards ===
Year	Category	Nominated work	Result	Ref.
2001	Outstanding Performance by a Female Actor in a Supporting Role	Almost Famous	Nominated	
2001	Outstanding Performance by a Cast in a Motion Picture	Almost Famous	Nominated	
2010	Outstanding Performance by a Cast in a Motion Picture	Nine	Nominated	
2026	Outstanding Performance by a Female Actor in a Leading Role	Song Sung Blue	Nominated	

=== BAFTA Awards ===
Year	Category	Nominated work	Result	Ref.
British Academy Film Awards
2001	Best Actress in a Leading Role	Almost Famous	Nominated	
2026	Best Actress in a Leading Role	Song Sung Blue	Nominated	

=== Critics' Choice Awards ===
Year	Category	Nominated work	Result	Ref.
Critics' Choice Movie Awards
2000	Breakthrough Artist	Almost Famous	Won	
2000	Best Supporting Actress	Almost Famous	Nominated	

=== Golden Globe Awards ===
Year	Category	Nominated work	Result	Ref.
2001	Best Supporting Actress – Motion Picture	Almost Famous	Won	
2021	Best Actress in a Motion Picture – Musical or Comedy	Music	Nominated	
2026	Best Actress in a Motion Picture – Musical or Comedy	Song Sung Blue	Nominated	

== Other awards ==
Year	Title	Accolade	Results	! Ref.
2000	—N/a	Golden Apple Award for Female Discovery of the Year	Won	
2000	Almost Famous	Award Circuit Community Award for Best Supporting Actress	Won	
2000	Almost Famous	Kansas City Film Critics Circle Award for Best Supporting Actress	Won	
2000	Almost Famous	Las Vegas Film Critics Society Award for Best Supporting Actress	Won	
2001	Almost Famous	American Comedy Award for Funniest Supporting Actress in a Motion Picture	Nominated	
2001	Almost Famous	Blockbuster Entertainment Award for Favorite Female – Newcomer	Won	
2001	Almost Famous	Chicago Film Critics Association Award for Most Promising Actress	Nominated	
2001	Almost Famous	Chicago Film Critics Association Award for Best Supporting Actress	Nominated	
2001	Almost Famous	Dallas-Fort Worth Film Critics Association Award for Best Supporting Actress	Won	
2001	Almost Famous	Florida Film Critics Circle Award for Newcomer of the Year	Won	
2001	Almost Famous	MTV Movie + TV Award for Best Female Performance	Nominated	
2001	Almost Famous	MTV Movie + TV Award for Best Dressed	Nominated	
2001	Almost Famous	Online Film & Television Association Award for Best Breakthrough Performance – Female	Nominated	
2001	Almost Famous	Online Film & Television Association Award for Best Supporting Actress	Nominated	
2001	Almost Famous	Online Film Critics Society Award for Best Cinematic Debut/Breakthrough	Nominated	
2001	Almost Famous	Online Film Critics Society Award for Best Supporting Actress	Won	
2001	Almost Famous	Online Film Critics Society Award for Best Ensemble	Won	
2001	Almost Famous	Phoenix Film Critics Society Award for Best Newcomer	Nominated	
2001	Almost Famous	Phoenix Film Critics Society Award for Best Supporting Actress	Won	
2001	Almost Famous	Satellite Award for Best Supporting Actress in a Motion Picture – Comedy or Musical	Won	
2001	Almost Famous	Southeastern Film Critics Association Award for Best Supporting Actress	Nominated	
2001	Almost Famous	Teen Choice Award for Choice Movie Actress	Nominated	
2003	How to Lose a Guy in 10 Days	MTV Movie + TV Award for Best Female Performance	Nominated	
2003	How to Lose a Guy in 10 Days	Teen Choice Award for Choice Movie Actress – Comedy	Nominated	
2003	How to Lose a Guy in 10 Days	Teen Choice Award for Choice Movie – Liar	Nominated	
2003	How to Lose a Guy in 10 Days	Teen Choice Award for Choice Movie – Hissy Fit	Nominated	
2003	How to Lose a Guy in 10 Days	Teen Choice Award for Choice Movie – Liplock (shared with Matthew McConaughey)	Nominated	
2003	Alex & Emma; How to Lose a Guy in 10 Days	The Stinkers Bad Movie Award for Worst Actress	Nominated	
2004	—N/a	Premiere New Power Award for Actress	Won	
2004	Raising Helen	Teen Choice Award for Choice Movie Actress – Comedy	Nominated	
2007	You, Me and Dupree	Teen Choice Award for Choice Movie Actress – Comedy	Nominated	
2008	Fool's Gold	Alliance of Women Film Journalists Award for Actress Most In Need of a New Agent	Won	
2009	Fool's Gold; My Best Friend's Girl	Golden Raspberry Award for Worst Actress	Nominated	
2009	—N/a	People's Choice Award for Favorite Leading Lady	Won	
2009	Bride Wars	MTV Movie + TV Award for Best Fight (shared with Anne Hathaway)	Nominated	
2009	Bride Wars	Teen Choice Award for Choice Movie Actress – Comedy	Nominated	
2009	Bride Wars	Teen Choice Award for Choice Movie – Hissy Fit	Nominated	
2009	Bride Wars	Teen Choice Award for Choice Movie – Rumble (shared with Anne Hathaway)	Nominated	
2009	Cutlass	Tribeca Film Festival Award for Best Narrative Short	Nominated	
2009	Nine	Satellite Award for Best Ensemble in a Motion Picture	Won	
2009	Nine	Washington DC Area Film Critics Association Award for Best Enemble	Nominated	
2010	Nine	Online Film & Television Association Award for Best Music, Original Song "Cinema Italiano"	Nominated	
2012	Something Borrowed	Alliance of Women Film Journalists Award for Actress Most In Need of a New Agent	Nominated	
2012	Almost Famous	Awards Circuit Community Award for Best Supporting Actress of the Decade	Runner-up	
2015	Wish I Was Here	Jupiter Award for Best International Actress	Nominated	
2017	Mother's Day	Golden Raspberry Award for Worst Supporting Actress	Nominated	
2021	Music	Golden Raspberry Award for Worst Actress	Won	
2025	Song Sung Blue	Gotham Independent Film Award – Musical Tribute Award	Won	
2025	Song Sung Blue	New York Film Critics Online Award for Best Actress	Nominated	
2025	Song Sung Blue	Palm Springs International Film Festival – Icon Award Actress	Won	
2025	Song Sung Blue	Razzie Redeemer Award	Won	
2026	Song Sung Blue	AACTA International Award for Best Actress	Nominated	
2026	Song Sung Blue	Houston Film Critics Society Award for Best Actress	Nominated	
2026	Song Sung Blue	Santa Barbara International Film Festival – Arlington Award	Won	
