= Fabletics =

American online subscription retailer

Fabletics, LLC

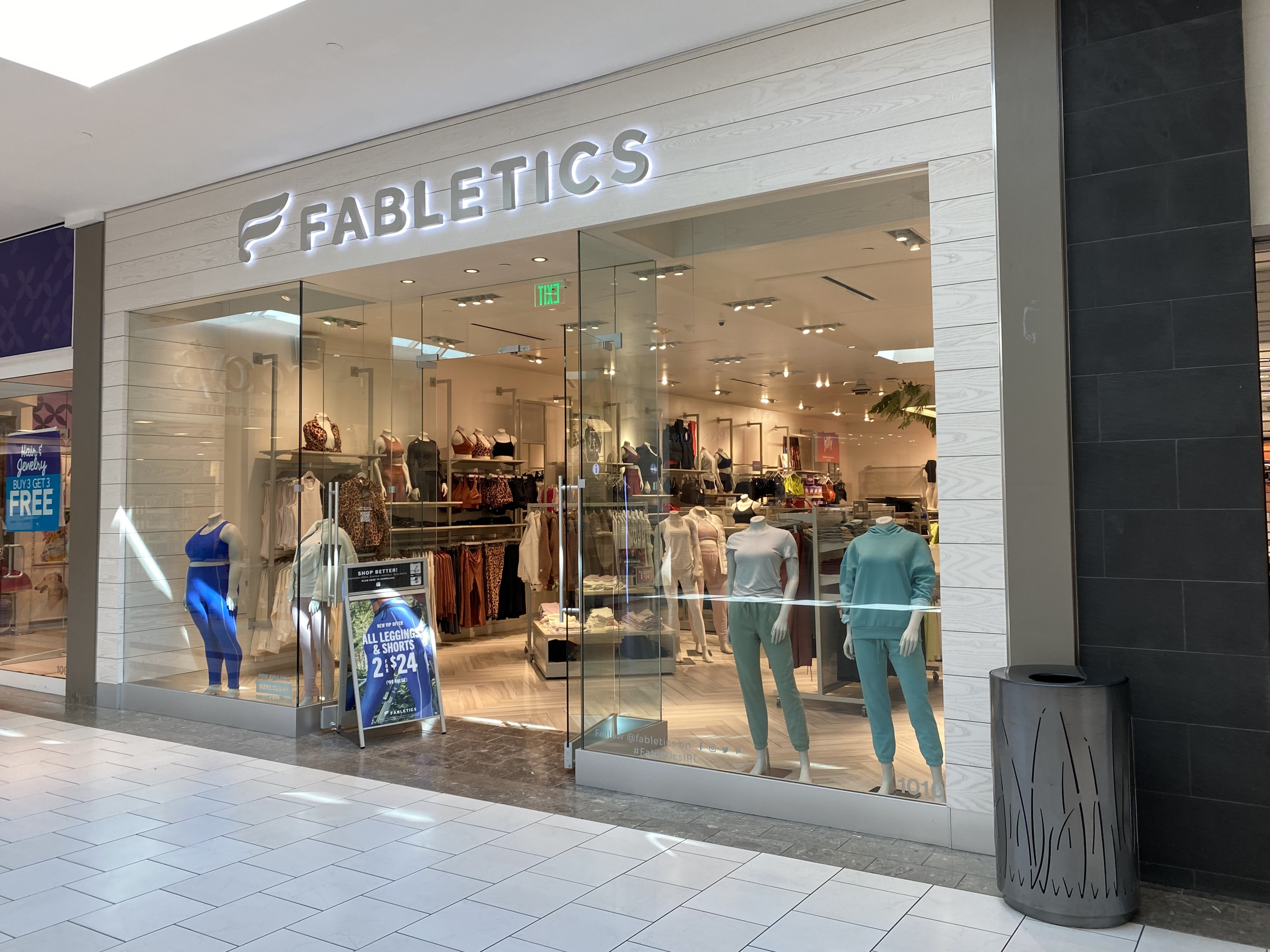
- Type: Private
- Industry: Retail
- Founded: July 2013; 13 years ago
- Founders: Adam Goldenberg; Don Ressler; Ginger Ressler
- Headquarters: El Segundo, California, U.S.
- Area served: Worldwide
- Key people: Don Ressler, Co-Founder & Adam Goldenberg, Co-Founder
- Products: Activewear
- Services: Membership and retail
- Revenue: $500 million (2021)
- Website: www.fabletics.com

Fabletics is a global active lifestyle brand that sells both men's and women's sportswear, footwear and accessories, commonly referred to as "activewear". The company is owned by the TechStyle Fashion Group holding group and operates on a subscription model and also has over 72 brick-and-mortar stores. Fabletics offers its members personalized outfits chosen for them based on their lifestyle and fashion preferences and releases capsules weekly in sizes XXS-4X for women and monthly in sizes XS–XXL for men.

== History ==
Fabletics was founded in 2013 by Adam Goldenberg, Don Ressler and Ginger Ressler under fashion incubator TechStyle Fashion Group. In 2015, Kate Hudson took a 20% stake in the company and became the face of a Fabletics line. Fabletics quickly became TechStyle's fastest-growing label. The company stocks its stores based on its online sales trends.

In 2017, the company added dresses and swimwear in the spring and footwear in the fall, including slip-ons, lifestyle sneakers, and workout shoes. In 2020, Fabletics announced that it had surpassed $500 million in annual revenue and 2 million members.

In 2020, the brand apologized for offering military discounts only to men, but not to women. In April 2020, Fabletics expanded to menswear, signing Kevin Hart as an investor and the face of the new brand. In March 2021, Fabletics released its Fabletics Fit app, which has hundreds of on-demand workouts, meditations and other content. Fabletics VIP members can access the app as part of the program, but nonmembers must pay $14.95 per month. The company expanded into loungewear in 2021 and has since launched a velour capsule with actress Vanessa Hudgens. Fabletics was named to Newsweek's Best Customer Service List of 2022.

In January 2022, Fabletics announced that Kate Hudson would switch from principal face of the brand to an advisory role. In May 2022, Fabletics launched a tennis line for both men and women. In 2023, Fabletics launched a medical scrubs line.

=== Locations ===
In the fall of 2015, Fabletics expanded to brick and mortar retail with its first store in Bridgewater, New Jersey. In the same year, the company opened their first Midwest location in St. Louis; located in the St. Louis Galleria. Since then Fabletics has opened over 73 North American stores and expanded into Europe. In October 2021, Fabletics opened its first non-US store in Berlin which was followed the company's first UK store, an experiential pop-up, on London's Regent Street. The London and Berlin stores bring Fabletics to 75 stores worldwide. Fabletics was one of few retailers to avoid layoffs during the COVID-19 pandemic, and shifted retail staff to "omni-associates" during this time. Fabletics has developed and deployed OmniSuite, a proprietary, cloud-based enterprise retail platform, in all of its stores. OmniSuite combines e-commerce, POS and order management solutions with back-office systems, and is utilized in all Fabletics retail locations.

As of 2020, Fabletics has established carbon neutrality at all of its stores, transitioned away from plastic shipment bags to recycled, biodegradable and reusable polybags and launched an eco-conscious capsule for Earth Day 2020 made entirely from recycled or upcycled materials. The company expanded into retail resale with ThredUp, in 2021. In May 2022, the company opened a new location in Valencia, California.

=== Partnerships ===
Hudson was named the ambassador for Fashion Targets Breast Cancer with Fabletics partnering on a pink capsule collection to support breast cancer awareness. In May 2017, the company announced a collaboration with singer Demi Lovato in support of the United Nations Foundation's Girl Up campaign. In October 2018, Fabletics announced a partnership with Varsity Spirit, making Fabletics Varsity's official activewear partner. As a part of this deal, Fabletics launched pop-up shops at Varsity Competitions in the US.

In October 2020, Fabletics and Varsity extended their partnership through 2024. In the same month, Fabletics announced a long-term partnership with Hydrow, the at-home rower with live and on-demand athlete-led workouts. As part of the Fabletics x Hydrow partnership, Fabletics members can purchase a Hydrow at members only pricing, plus access to an accessories and gear package. In addition, Fabletics is Hydrow's official apparel partner, designing and producing all Hydrow apparel, and Hydrow's trainers will exclusively wear Fabletics in all of Hydrow's workout content.

In 2021, Tough Mudder chose Fabletics as its "active lifestyle" partner. In November 2021, Fabletics began working with college athletes and tournaments to grow its men's business. The company sponsored the Jacksonville Classic, and announced that it is planning partnerships with individual NCAA players. In April 2021, Kevin and Eniko Hart released the Hart Collection, the brand's first capsule designed for men and women. In December 2021, Vanessa Hudgens was announced as a spokesperson for the brand, releasing the Velour x Fabletics collection, with pieces made of velour.

In April 2022, Hudgens also released a summer Y2K-inspired collection designed by herself, called Sun-Daze by Vanessa Hudgens. In the same month, Fabletics partnered with singer Lizzo to launch a size-inclusive (sizes of 6X to XS) shape-wear brand called Yitty.

In 2023, Fabletics partnered with actor and physician Ken Jeong to launch and promote its medical scrubs line. Since launching, Fabletics has released a number of capsules with notable brand partners, including Maddie Ziegler, Kelly Rowland, Madelaine Petsch, Khloé Kardashian, and others.

== Business model ==
Fabletics operates under a subscription model branded as its "VIP Membership Program", priced at $59.95 a month. Customers must call to cancel, because emails "can contain inadequate information to process cancellation," according to a Fabletics spokesperson.

== Controversies ==
=== Hippo Knitting ===
A 2021 Time magazine article about Hippo Knitting, a Lesotho manufacturing company that supplies Fabletics, reviewed reports from at least 38 workers alleging sexual and physical abuse from management. The investigation found instances of sexual assault by managers, verbal and physical abuse with punishments such as being denied bathroom breaks and forced to crawl on the floor, and over a dozen workers claimed their underwear and vulvas were often exposed during routine daily searches by supervisor. A Fabletics spokesperson said the brand vowed to do "everything in [their] power to further remedy the situation". Production at Hippo Knitting stopped on May 3, 2021.

=== 2025 class action lawsuit ===
In March 2025, consumers filed a lawsuit in California alleging that Fabletics violated state consumer protection laws by misleading customers about its VIP Membership Program, including the value of its promotional member credits and the program's automatic renewal charges. The lawsuit followed a multistate settlement involving its parent company, TechStyle Fashion Group, over similar membership practices.
