= TechStyle Fashion Group =

Fashion retailer

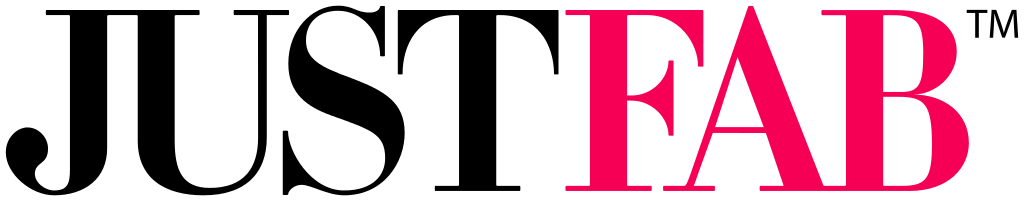
- Formerly: JustFab Inc.
- Type: Private
- Industry: E-commerce
- Founded: March 2010
- Founder: Don Ressler; Adam Goldenberg
- Headquarters: El Segundo
- Area served: United States, Canada, United Kingdom, Germany, France, Spain, Sweden, Denmark, Netherlands, Australia, Belgium, Austria
- Key people: Adam Goldenberg (CEO)
- Products: Shoes, handbags, jewelry, denim, activewear, lingerie, children's apparel
- Services: Fashion membership, marketing, merchandising
- Divisions: FabKids; Fabletics; JustFab; ShoeDazzle; Savage X Fenty
- Website: www.techstyle.com

TechStyle Fashion Group, formerly JustFab Inc., is an online, membership fashion retailer that has a portfolio of five direct-to-consumer brands including JustFab, FabKids, ShoeDazzle, Savage X Fenty, and Fabletics. Its brands carries selections of shoes, handbags, jewelry, lingerie, activewear, and denim. It offers a personalized shopping experience based on members' indicated fashion preferences. As of 2019 the company has over 5 million paying VIP members, earning revenues of $800 million.

== History ==
JustFab was founded by Don Ressler and Adam Goldenberg in March 2010. JustFab continued international expansion into Spain and France after acquiring The Fab Shoes in May 2013. A television show about TechStyle brand JustFab and Simmons titled "Kimora: House of Fab" premiered on the Style Network in January 2013. The show covered daily life at the JustFab offices, Simmons’ role as president and creative director, and the duties of the company's marketing, merchandising, and public relations departments.

In August 2016, the company was officially rebranded from JustFab, Inc. to TechStyle Fashion Group. Its portfolio of brands operate under the subscription model, and collaborate with celebrities and influencers to build capsules that resonate with their consumer base. Its brands have collaborated with Demi Lovato, Kelly Rowland, Maddie Ziegler, Rita Ora, and Normani.

In August 2017 JustFab was issued an ASA ban for luring customers into a subscription via a promotion on its website.

In August 2020, TechStyle Fashion Group donated $1.5 million worth of clothing apparel to Good360 with the purpose to lessen excess inventory waste, with the bulk of the apparel being returned clothing.

In 2020, JustFab was included on Elite Daily’s list of plus-sized brands to try. In July 2020, TechStyle Fashion Group Named Nina Fuhrman Chief Merchant for JustFab and ShoeDazzle. Singer Kelly Rowland produced a capsule for office clothing and lounge wear through JustFab in 2020.

=== FabKids ===
In January 2013, TechStyle, then JustFab, acquired children's fashion-subscription company FabKids. Despite the similarity in their names, there was no previous association between the two companies. In September 2020, Entertainment Tonight Online named FabKids on a list of the best kids shoes on the market.

=== Shoedazzle ===
TechStyle (then JustFab) acquired rival shoe subscription service ShoeDazzle in August 2013, but the two companies continued to run as separate brands. In July 2020 ShoeDazzle was recognized by Forbes for its personalized loyalty program following collaborations with Jessie James Decker, Erika Jane, Porsha Williams and Aliya Janell.

=== Fabletics ===
Fabletics, an online athletic wear retailer, was founded by Adam Goldenberg, Don Ressler and Kate Hudson in July 2013. In 2015, Fabletics was TechStyle's fastest growing label.

In April 2019, Fabletics expanded to brick and mortar retail with its first store in Soho, Manhattan. Fabletics has opened 50 North American stores with eight of these locations opened after COVID-19 restrictions lifted in June 2020. In April 2020, Fabletics expanded to menswear, signing Kevin Hart as an investor and the face of the new brand.

=== Savage X Fenty ===
In May 2018, TechStyle partnered with Rihanna to launch Savage X Fenty, a lingerie, sleepwear, and accessories brand for women and men. The original launch in 2018 included four capsule collections in the main line, and the brand expanded and launched numerous capsules, often with celebrity partners Normani and Lizzo. Associated with diversity and body-positive messaging, Savage X Fenty bras are available from a 32A to 44DD, with lingerie, undies, and loungewear coming in sizes from XS to 3XL. Savage x Fenty has also made headline news for the last three consecutive years during New York Fashion Week, with the brand’s fashion shows frequently being dubbed as a highlight of the week. In March 2020, Fast Company named Savage x Fenty one of the 10 most innovative style companies of 2020, alongside brands such as Madewell and Levi Strauss & Co. In October 2020, Savage x Fenty launched the brand’s first menswear collection with Christian Combs, which debuted at the 2020 Fashion Show during New York Fashion Week.

=== Funding ===
In 2011, TechStyle (operating under the name JustFab) received $33 million in funding from US venture capital firm Matrix Partners. In 2012 the company received an additional $76 million from Matrix Partners, Rho Ventures, Technology Crossover Ventures, and Intelligent Beauty and expanded its operations internationally to Canada, Germany, and the UK.

In September 2013, TechStyle's CEOs Adam Goldenberg and Don Ressler announced that the company closed $40 million in its third round of funding to accelerate its already-fast international growth and enter new product categories.

In August 2014, TechStyle (then called JustFab) closed an additional round of funding for $85 million which was led by Passport Special Opportunity Fund and included participation from existing investors Shining Capital, Matrix Partners, and Technology Crossover Ventures. The additional round of funding brought the company's total capitalization to $250 million.

== Membership Model ==
TechStyle’s Fashion Group operates a membership model, selling monthly subscriptions in which consumers received discounts and occasional free clothing items across its brands. Member prices fluctuate across brands, with the pricing between $40 to $50 a month. The registration process requires members to complete a survey regarding their fashion preferences. At the beginning of each month, a member can choose one of the selections, request new options, or skip the month altogether without charge. Unused credits are not refunded, and selections do not roll over. In February 2019, TechStyle reached more than 5 million members.

=== Lawsuits against business model ===
In 2020, Truth in Advertising filed a lawsuit against TechStyle for the company's automatic enrollment techniques. The company subsequently reached a settlement with California's state government for $1.2 million and agreed to make changes to the website and set aside funds to provide refunds to eligible California consumers.

In 2025, TFG Holding Inc. agreed to a $4.8 million multistate settlement with North Carolina Attorney General Jeff Jackson and 32 other state attorneys general after multiple states sued TFG Holdings, alleging that TechStyle Fashion Group automatically enrolled consumers in its VIP programs without adequate notice. According to the investigations by multiple attorneys general, consumers were often enrolled in these programs without adequate knowledge or consent, that consumers did not realize these programs had recurring subscription charges, and cancellation was intentionally complicated. Money from the settlement will be used as restitution for affected consumers.
