= Glorious (Kate Hudson album) =

- Standard edition cover

Studio album by Kate Hudson
- Released: May 17, 2024
- Studio: Linda Perry (Los Angeles); Fujikama (Los Angeles); MXM (Los Angeles)
- Length: 43:24
- Label: HK; Virgin
- Producer: Danny Fujikawa; Linda Perry; Johan Carlsson

Singles from Glorious
- 1. "Talk About Love" Released: January 30, 2024; 2. "Live Forever" Released: March 28, 2024; 3. "Gonna Find Out" Released: April 17, 2024

Alternative cover
- Deluxe edition cover

Professional ratings
Review scores
Source	Rating
AllMusic	4/5 stars
The AU Review	4/5 stars

Glorious is the debut studio album by American actress and singer Kate Hudson, released on May 17, 2024, by HK Music and Virgin Music Group.

== Singles ==
The album's lead single, "Talk About Love", was released on January 30, 2024. She wrote the song alongside her fiancée Danny Fujikawa and Linda Perry. The official music video, directed by Kimberly Stuckwisch, was released on March 4, 2024.

"Live Forever" was released as the album's second single on March 28, 2024. the song was hailed by Rolling Stone as "a love letter to parents". A music video was released the same day.

The third single, "Gonna Find Out", was released on April 17, 2024.

== Promotion ==
On March 14, 2024, Hudson performed "Talk About Love" at the 35th GLAAD Media Awards. She performed "Gonna Find Out" on the May 2, 2024 episode of The Tonight Show Starring Jimmy Fallon. She performed the song on May 7, 2024, on The Howard Stern Show. Hudson performed the album's titular track on the season 25 finale of The Voice.

== Commercial performance ==
Glorious earned 8,000 album equivalent units in the US in its first week, debuting at number 3 on Billboard's Heatseekers Albums chart and number 41 on the Independent Albums chart. The album sold 7,000 copies, with 2,000 of that in vinyl, placing it at number 10 on the Top Album Sales chart and number 19 on the Vinyl Albums chart.

In the United Kingdom, Glorious debuted at number 81 on the UK Album Downloads Chart Top 100 on 24 May 2024, peaking at number 18 in February 2025, after the release of the deluxe version of the album. Additionally, in 2025, Glorious debuted and peaked at number 28 on the UK Independent Albums Chart, and at number 71 on the UK Physical Albums Chart.

== Track listing ==
Standard edition
No.	Title	Writer(s)	Producer(s)	Length
1.	"Gonna Find Out"	Kate Hudson; Danny Fujikawa; Linda Perry	Fujikawa; Johan Carlsson; Perry; Peter Karlsson^{[v]}	3:30
2.	"Fire"	Hudson; Fujikawa; Carlsson; Perry	Carlsson; Fujikawa; Perry; Karlsson^{[v]}	3:09
3.	"The Nineties"	Hudson; Fujikawa; Carlsson; Perry	Carlsson; Fujikawa; Perry; Karlsson^{[v]}	4:01
4.	"Live Forever"	Hudson; Carlsson; Fujikawa; Perry	Carlsson; Fujikawa	3:13
5.	"Talk About Love"	Hudson; Carlsson; Fujikawa; Perry	Carlsson; Fujikawa; Karlsson^{[v]}	3:48
6.	"Love Ain't Easy"	Hudson; Fujikawa	Carlsson; Fujikawa; Perry	4:15
7.	"Romeo"	Hudson; Fujikawa	Carlsson; Fujikawa; Karlsson^{[v]}	2:56
8.	"Never Made a Moment"	Hudson; Fujikawa	Carlsson; Fujikawa; Perry	3:41
9.	"Lying to Myself"	Hudson; Fujikawa; Perry	Carlsson; Fujikawa; Perry; Karlsson^{[v]}	3:41
10.	"Not Easy to Know"	Hudson; Fujikawa; Perry	Carlsson; Fujikawa; Perry	3:31
11.	"Glorious"	Hudson; Perry	Carlsson; Fujikawa; Perry; Karlsson^{[v]}	3:52
12.	"Touch the Light"	Hudson; Fujikawa; Perry	Carlsson; Fujikawa; Perry	3:43
Total length:				43:24

Deluxe edition
No.	Title	Writer(s)	Producer(s)	Length
13.	"Right on Time"	Hudson	Carlsson; Fujikawa; Perry
14.	"Desert Warrior"	Hudson; Fujikawa; Perry	Carlsson; Fujikawa; Perry

Note

- ^{^[v]} signifies a vocal producer

== Personnel ==
Musicians

- Kate Hudson – lead vocals (all tracks), background vocals (tracks 3–5, 9)
- Johan Carlsson – drum programming (tracks 1–3, 5, 7, 9, 12), background vocals (1, 5), synthesizer (2, 3, 5–7, 9–12), drums (2, 4, 6, 9), tambourine (2, 3, 6, 8, 11), percussion (3, 4), sampler (3), piano (6, 10), shakers (8, 11), Mellotron (8), organ (10), Wurlitzer (10), bass guitar (11)
- Kitten Kuroi – background vocals (tracks 1–6, 8–12)
- Maiya Sykes – background vocals (tracks 1–6, 8–12)
- Danny Fujikawa – background vocals (1, 5, 6, 11, 12), synthesizer (1, 5, 7, 9, 11), horn (1, 3, 7), bass guitar (1, 7, 9); drum machine, rhythm guitar (1); percussion (3), acoustic guitar (5, 7, 8), drums (5, 7, 9), lead guitar (5, 7, 10), keyboards (8), piano (11)
- Joshua Ray Gooch – lead guitar (tracks 1–4, 6, 8–10, 12), rhythm guitar (2, 5, 10, 12), acoustic guitar (3, 4, 8)
- Eli Wulfmeier – lead guitar (tracks 1–4, 8, 10), rhythm guitar (2, 6, 12), acoustic guitar (4)
- Tamir Barzilay – drums (tracks 1, 4, 6, 8, 10–12), shakers (3)
- Charles Jones – organ (tracks 1, 4)
- Colette Carlsson – background vocals (1, 5)
- Misty Carlsson – handclaps (tracks 2, 3, 5, 6, 10)
- Rani Rose – handclaps (tracks 2, 3, 5, 6, 10)
- Mattias Bylund – synthesizer (tracks 2, 6, 8, 10–12); brass, horn (6)
- David Bukovinszky – cello (tracks 2, 6, 8, 10, 12)
- Mattias Johansson – violin (tracks 2, 6, 8, 10, 12)
- Nils-Petter Ankarblom – synthesizer (tracks 2, 8, 10, 12)
- Whynot Jansveld – bass guitar (tracks 3, 4, 6, 8, 10–12)
- Tomas Jonsson – baritone saxophone, tenor saxophone (track 6)
- Magnus Johansson – French horn, trumpet (track 6)
- Wojtek Goral – alto saxophone (track 6)
- Jonathan Low – tambourine (track 6)
- Peter Noos Johansson – trombone (track 6)
- Janne Bjerger – trumpet (track 6)
- Linda Perry – rhythm guitar (track 10)
- Erik Arvinder – strings conductor (track 11)

Technical

- Greg Calbi – mastering
- Steve Fallone – mastering
- Jonathan Low – mixing
- Linda Perry – engineering
- Luis Flores – engineering
- Danny Fujikawa – engineering
- Johan Carlsson – engineering

== Charts ==
Chart performance for Glorious
Chart (2024)	Peak position
UK Album Downloads (OCC)	81
US Heatseekers Albums (Billboard)	3
US Independent Albums (Billboard)	41
US Top Album Sales (Billboard)	10
US Vinyl Albums (Billboard)	19

Chart (2025)	Peak position
UK Album Downloads (OCC)	18
UK Independent Albums	28
UK Physical Albums	71
