= ShoeDazzle =

Online fashion subscription service

- Type: Subsidiary
- Industry: Retail
- Founded: March 19, 2009; 17 years ago
- Founder: Kim Kardashian; Brian Lee; Robert Shapiro; M.J. Eng
- Headquarters: El Segundo, California, U.S.
- Key people: Adam Goldenberg (Co-CEO); Don Ressler (Co-CEO); Brian Lee (Co-founder & chairman); M.J. Eng (Co-founder & president)
- Products: Shoes, accessories, clothes
- Parent: TechStyle Fashion Group
- Website: shoedazzle.com

ShoeDazzle is a California-based online fashion subscription service that offers a monthly selection of shoes, handbags and jewelry curated to their members' fashion preferences.

== History ==
The company was founded by Kim Kardashian, Brian Lee, Robert Shapiro and M.J. Eng in 2009. The company is headquartered in El Segundo, California.

In September 2011, Bill Strauss, the former CEO of Provide Commerce (which operates sites such as ProFlowers), became ShoeDazzle's CEO. Co-founder Lee became chairman. In March 2012, ShoeDazzle dropped its $39.95 monthly subscription model and expanded into apparel, handbags, weddings and lingerie.

In 2013, fashion expert Rachel Zoe joined ShoeDazzle as Chief Stylist.

In August 2013, ShoeDazzle was acquired by rival online fashion subscription service JustFab. The two companies continued to run independently as separate brands. JustFab rebranded to TechStyle Fashion Group in 2017, and reinstated the $39.95 monthly subscription service.
