= Kate Hudson =

American actress and singer (born 1979)

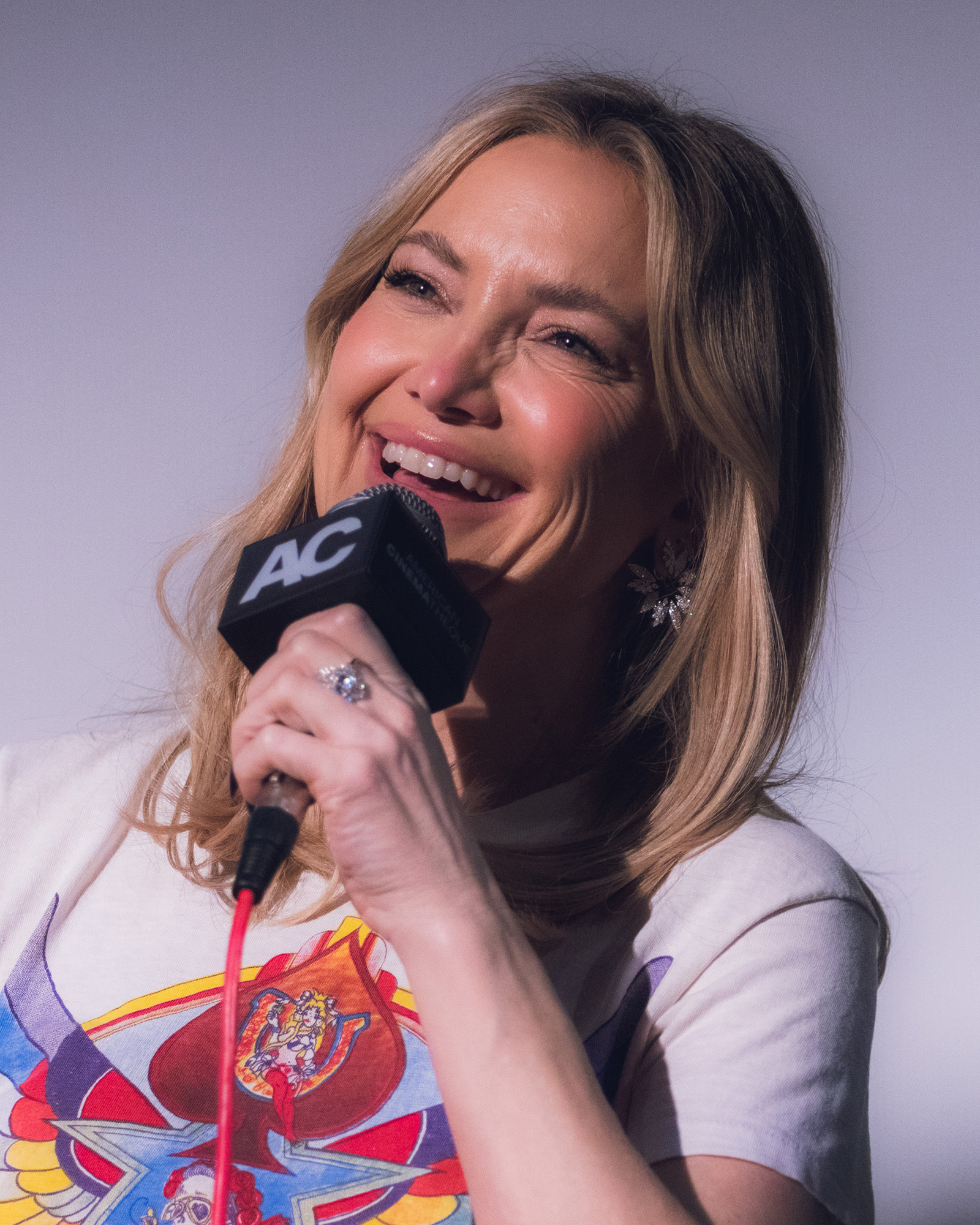
- Hudson in 2026
- Born: Kate Garry Hudson; April 19, 1979 (age 47); Los Angeles, California, U.S.
- Occupations: Actress; singer-songwriter
- Years active: 1996–present
- Spouse: Chris Robinson (m. 2000; div. 2007)
- Partners: Matt Bellamy (2010–2014); Danny Fujikawa (2016‍–‍present; engaged)
- Children: 3
- Parents: Bill Hudson; Goldie Hawn
- Relatives: Oliver Hudson (brother); Wyatt Russell (half-brother); Mark Hudson (uncle); Brett Hudson (uncle); Sarah Hudson (cousin)
- Awards: Full list
- Musical career
- Genre: Pop
- Instrument: Vocals
- Label: Virgin Music Group

Kate Garry Hudson (born April 19, 1979) is an American actress and singer-songwriter. Born to singer Bill Hudson and actress Goldie Hawn, Hudson made her film debut in the 1998 drama Desert Blue, which was followed by supporting roles in several films. She rose to prominence with her portrayal of Penny Lane in Cameron Crowe's musical drama Almost Famous (2000), for which she won the Golden Globe for Best Supporting Actress and received a nomination for the Academy Award for Best Supporting Actress.

Throughout the 2000s, Hudson starred in the romantic comedies How to Lose a Guy in 10 Days (2003), You, Me and Dupree (2006), Fool's Gold (2008), and Bride Wars (2009). On the television side, she had a recurring role in the musical series Glee (2012–2013), and starring roles in the thriller series Truth Be Told (2022) and comedy series Running Point (2025–present). Her other film credits include The Skeleton Key (2005), Nine (2009), Rock the Kasbah (2015), Deepwater Horizon (2016), and Mother's Day (2016). She earned another two Golden Globe nominations, for Best Actress in a Motion Picture – Musical or Comedy, for her performances in Music (2021) and Song Sung Blue (2025). Her portrayal of Claire Sardina in the latter also earned a nomination for the Academy Award for Best Actress.

Hudson is a co-founder of the fitness brand and membership program Fabletics, operated by TechStyle Fashion Group. She is also the author of the non-fiction books Pretty Happy: Healthy Ways to Love Your Body (2016) and Pretty Fun: Creating and Celebrating a Lifetime of Tradition (2017). Hudson released her debut studio music album, Glorious, in 2024.

== Early life ==
Hudson was born in Los Angeles, the daughter of actress Goldie Hawn and Bill Hudson, an actor, comedian, and musician. Her parents divorced when she was 18 months old. She and her older brother, actor Oliver Hudson, were raised in Snowmass, Colorado, and Pacific Palisades, California, by her mother and her mother's longtime boyfriend, actor Kurt Russell. Hudson's ancestry is Italian (from her paternal grandmother), Hungarian Jewish (from her maternal grandmother), and the remainder a mix of English and some German. She grew up Jewish; like her mother, she also practices Buddhism.

Hudson has said that her biological father "doesn't know me from a hole in the wall", and she considers Russell her father. Hudson said her mother is "the woman that I've learned the most from, and who I look up to, who has conducted her life in a way that I can look up to". She has four half-siblings: Emily and Zachary Hudson, from her biological father's later marriage to actress Cindy Williams; Lalania Hudson, from her father's relationship with another woman; and Wyatt Russell, from her mother's relationship with Kurt Russell.

In 1997, she graduated from Crossroads, a college preparatory school in Santa Monica. She was accepted to New York University, but chose to pursue an acting career instead of an undergraduate degree.

== Career ==
=== 1996–2001: Beginnings and Almost Famous ===
At age 11, Hudson performed on stage at the Santa Monica Playhouse. She made her film debut with a small role the comedy-drama Desert Blue (1998), and then appeared in the romantic comedy 200 Cigarettes (1999). She took on the roles of a college student in the psychological thriller Gossip, the lesbian daughter of the titular character in the romantic-comedy Dr. T & the Women and one of the leading roles in the romantic comedy About Adam, all of which were released during 2000.

Her breakthrough came with the role of a veteran groupie in Cameron Crowe's semi-autobiographical comedy-drama Almost Famous (2000). She "hung in and had turned down leads in other movies just to play the part" and soon obtained it "because of her loyalty", according to Crowe. For her performance, she won the Golden Globe Award for Best Supporting Actress at the 58th Golden Globe Awards and was nominated for an Academy Award for Best Supporting Actress at the 73rd Academy Awards. Entertainment Weekly put it on its end-of-the-decade, "best-of" list, saying, "This power ballad of a movie also happens to be Crowe's greatest (and most personal) film thanks to the golden gods of Stillwater and their biggest fan, Kate Hudson's incomparable Penny Lane." She worked hard in avoiding association with her well-known parents, as she did not want to be perceived as someone who "rode on somebody's coattails".

=== 2002–2009: Romantic comedies ===
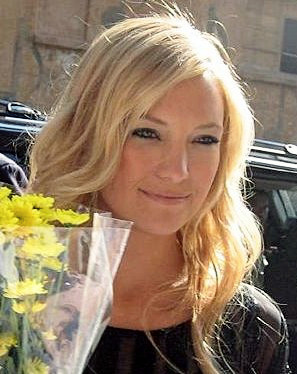
Hudson in July 2006

In 2002, Hudson appeared in the remake of the historical romance The Four Feathers, as the fiancée of a young British officer (played by Heath Ledger). The film was a critical and commercial failure. In her next film, the romantic comedy How to Lose a Guy in 10 Days (2003), Hudson starred with Matthew McConaughey, as a writer for a women's magazine who, for an article, starts dating a guy and trying to drive him away using only the "classic mistakes women make" in relationships. It received mixed reviews, although Hudson was praised for her performance and her chemistry with McConaughey, and the film was a box office success. She starred opposite Naomi Watts in the Merchant-Ivory film Le Divorce (2003), portraying a woman who, with her sister, dispute the ownership of a painting by Georges de La Tour with the family of her former brother-in-law. Entertainment Weekly gave the film a "C" rating and wrote: "I'm disappointed to report that Hudson and Watts have no chemistry as sisters". Her next romantic comedies, Alex & Emma (2003), in which she played a stubborn stenographer, and Raising Helen (2004), taking on the role of a young woman who becomes the guardian of her deceased sister's children, were released to varying degrees of success.

In 2005, Hudson starred in the supernatural thriller The Skeleton Key, as a young hospice nurse who acquires a job at a New Orleans plantation home, and becomes entangled in a supernatural mystery involving the house. In its review, The Washington Post, describing her, wrote: "Hudson, who dials back her native, Goldie-given charm here to give Caroline a no-nonsense brusqueness, manages to convincingly convey a fearless bullheadedness rather than less sympathetic naivete". The film was a box office hit, grossing over US$91.9 million worldwide ($47.9 million in North America).

Her next film, the comedy You, Me and Dupree, in she appeared with Owen Wilson and Matt Dillon as one half of a couple who allows an unemployed friend to move in. It was a box office success, and in Universal Pictures' distributor research Hudson was noted as an important factor for audiences choosing to see the film.

In 2007, Hudson directed the short film Cutlass, one of Glamour magazine's "Reel Moments" based on readers' personal essays, which starred Kurt Russell, Dakota Fanning, Virginia Madsen, Chevy Chase and Kristen Stewart.

In the romantic comedy Fool's Gold (2008), her second film with McConaughey, Hudson took on the role a divorced woman who returns with her former husband while searching for a lost treasure. She was certified in scuba diving in the Great Barrier Reef for the underwater scenes. The film received generally negative reviews, with criticism for the lack of chemistry among the cast, but it was a moderate commercial success, grossed $111.2 million worldwide. In My Best Friend's Girl, another romantic comedy released in 2008, Hudson played the colleague of an amiable guy, played by Jason Biggs. Like Fool's Gold, the film received generally negative reviews but was also a moderate commercial success. Hudson received a Golden Raspberry Award nomination, jointly for both Fool's Gold and also for My Best Friend's Girl.

Hudson starred in Bride Wars (2009), alongside Anne Hathaway, playing two best friends who become rivals after their weddings are scheduled on the same day. The film was named among the 10 worst chick flicks of all time by Time in 2010, but was successful financially, grossing US$114.6 million globally. Her next film was the musical Nine, directed by Rob Marshall, in which she played a Vogue fashion journalist, alongside Daniel Day-Lewis, Marion Cotillard, Penélope Cruz, Nicole Kidman, and Judi Dench. The film received critical acclaim, with Hudson earning praise for her dancing, particularly in the 1960s-inspired musical number "Cinema Italiano," which was written specifically for her character.

=== 2010–2020: Career fluctuations ===
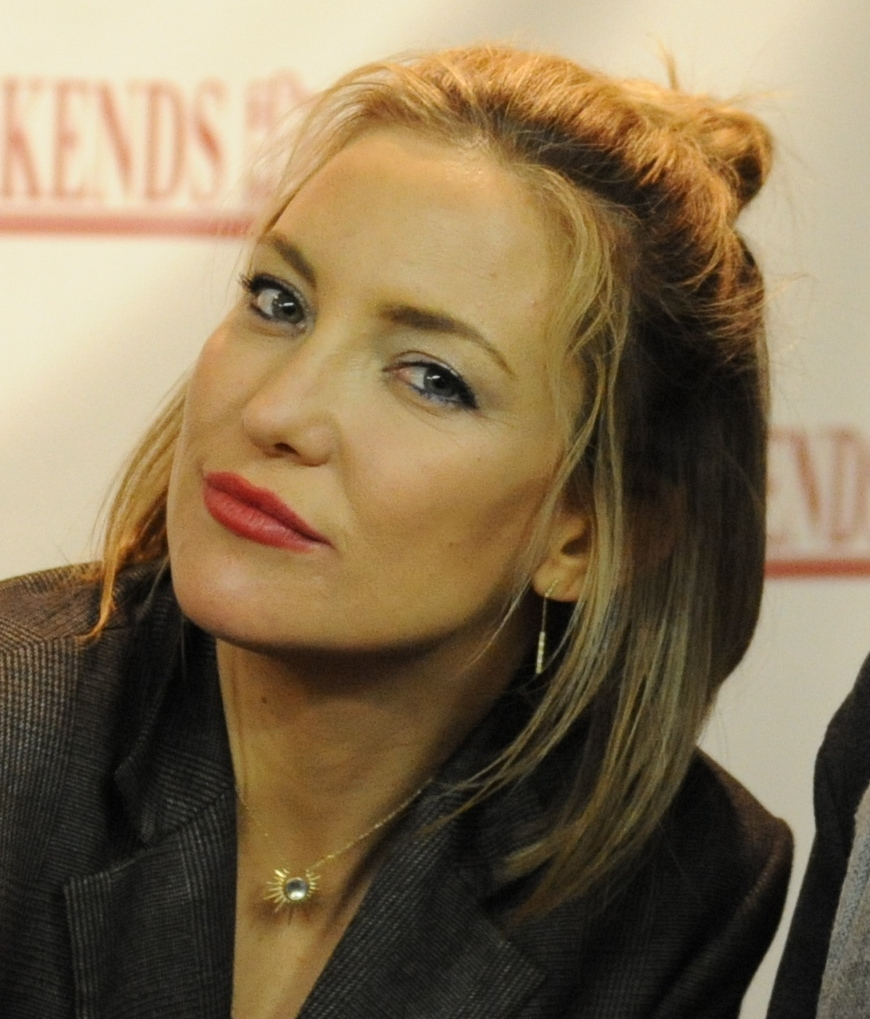
Hudson in February 2016

Hudson starred with Casey Affleck and Jessica Alba, as the wife of a West Texas serial killer, in the film adaptation of The Killer Inside Me, which premiered at the 2010 Sundance Film Festival. In 2011, Hudson played a quickwitted, carefree ad executive in the romantic comedy film A Little Bit of Heaven, and a party girl in another romantic comedy, Something Borrowed, based on Emily Giffin's novel of the same name. In is review for the latter, Detroit News remarked: "Kate Hudson looks exhausted, as if she is as tired of wading through another one of her feckless duds as we are of watching them". While A Little Bit of Heaven found a limited release in theaters, Something Borrowed was a moderate commercial success.

In 2012, Hudson was cast on the Fox teen comedy series Glee, in the recurring role of Cassandra July, a dance teacher at the fictitious New York Academy of the Dramatic Arts.

In 2013, Hudson appeared in the political thriller The Reluctant Fundamentalist, as a photographer and the girlfriend of a professor at the University of Lahore. In 2014, she starred in the comedy Wish I Was Here, as the wife of a struggling actor, and the thriller Good People, as one half of a couple who fall into severe debt while renovating their family's home. The aforementioned films received a limited release and mixed reviews from critics.

In Rock the Kasbah (2015), Hudson played a top-hatted hooker with a heart of gold who befriends a has-been actor manager (Bill Murray) in Afghanistan. Despite a US$15-million budget, the film made just US$3 million at the North American box office.

Hudson voiced a crazy ribbon-dancing panda in the DreamWorks Animation film Kung Fu Panda 3 (2016), which grossed US$521.1 million globally, and became her most widely seen film. She starred as a woman married to an Indian man and the sister of a lesbian woman, both of whom had not told their conservative parents, in the romantic comedy Mother's Day (2016), directed by Garry Marshall and opposite Julia Roberts, Timothy Olyphant, and Jason Sudeikis. The film was panned by critics and a moderate commercial success. She next played the wife of a chief electronics technician (Mark Wahlberg) in the drama Deepwater Horizon, based on the Deepwater Horizon explosion. While critical response was positive, the film was only slightly profitable, making US$121.8 million on a budget of around US$110 million.

In the 2017 film Marshall, Hudson portrayed an employer accusing her black chauffeur of rape. It received positive reviews from critics, but found a limited audience in theaters.

=== 2021–present: Further success and debut studio album ===
In 2021, Hudson starred as Kazu Gamble in the musical drama film Music, co-written and directed by Sia. For her performance, she received her second Golden Globe nomination. Hudson also won the Golden Raspberry Award for Worst Actress, while Sia won Worst Director. Also in 2021, she starred in Mona Lisa and the Blood Moon, a fantasy thriller film by writer-director Ana Lily Amirpour.

In 2022, she starred, alongside Michael Shannon, in A Little White Lie, directed by Michael Maren. Also in 2022, Hudson co-starred in Glass Onion: A Knives Out Mystery, playing the role of Birdie Jay, a Manhattan supermodel turned fashion designer involved in a murder mystery.

In January 2024, Hudson signed a record deal with Virgin Music Group, and released her debut single, "Talk About Love". She wrote the song alongside her fiancée Danny Fujikawa and Linda Perry. Hudson released the single "Live Forever" on March 28, 2024; the song was hailed by Rolling Stone as "a love letter to parents". Hudson followed with "Gonna Find Out", which was released on April 17, 2024. She released her debut studio album, Glorious, on May 17, 2024. On August 28, 2024, Hudson released a cover of the 1985 'Til Tuesday single "Voices Carry".

In 2025, Hudson starred as Claire Sardina in Song Sung Blue, alongside Hugh Jackman, for which she received Lead Actress nominations for the Academy Award, Actor Award, BAFTA Award, and Golden Globe Award. Her performance was praised by critics as one of her best. Clayton Davis of Variety wrote of her performance, "It's a revelatory piece of acting that announces itself, just like the full-throated power of a Neil Diamond chorus — an impossibly tender and ferocious piece that feels evidently alive." Addressing her awards success for the film, Hudson said, "When you're younger and this happens, there's a different feeling to it — it's more of a shock entrance, or invitation, into this world. But when you've been in it for 26 years, it's a completely different relationship to the kindness and outpouring of positivity. It feels just so warm. It's a very nice feeling and also inspiring. It gets me excited about the things moving forward that I want to be doing."

== Other ventures ==
In 2013, Hudson, in a partnership with online fashion retailer TechStyle Fashion Group, launched her own line of workout clothes and active wear, Fabletics, which currently operates 25 stores in the United States. The venture became her focus, and in a 2018 interview, Hudson remarked: "I work more on Fabletics now than I do on movies."

In 2016, Hudson released her first book, Pretty Happy: Healthy Ways to Love Your Body. In 2017, she released her second book, Pretty Fun: Creating and Celebrating a Lifetime of Tradition.

In August 2018, Hudson and New York & Company announced their partnership, a multi-year deal to represent the ambassador for the company's US$200-million Soho Jeans collection, and to develop her own fashion line. In 2018, Hudson collaborated with her mother Goldie to create a capsule collection, with 50 percent of net proceeds will benefit MindUP, a program within the Goldie Hawn Foundation.

In November 2019, Hudson launched King St. Vodka, a vodka from California. A podcast, Sibling Revelry, by Hudson and her brother Oliver, resulted in "playfully bickering" while promoting it on The Late Show with Stephen Colbert in 2022.

== Personal life ==
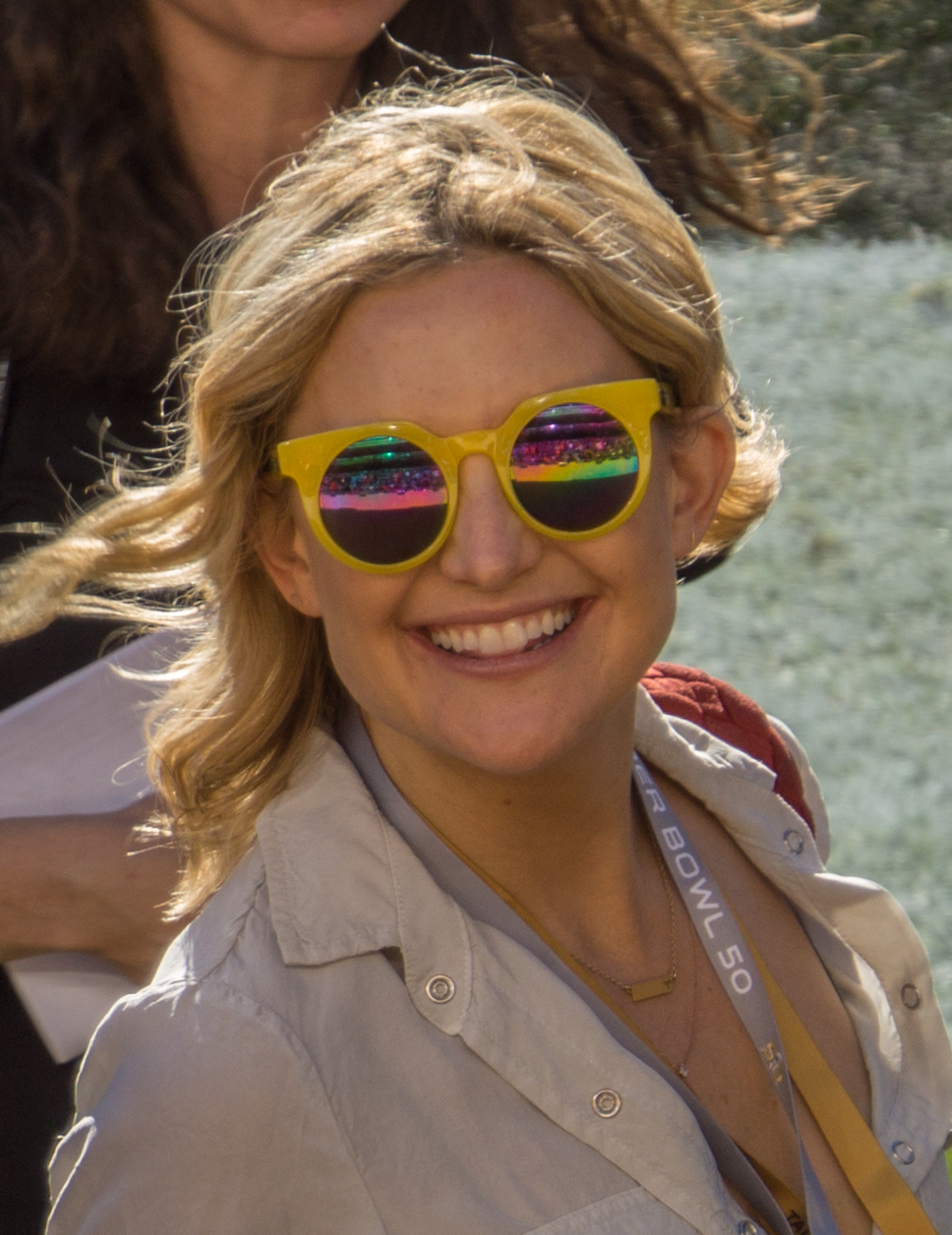
Hudson at Super Bowl 50 in 2016

Hudson was married to Chris Robinson, lead singer for the Black Crowes. They married on December 31, 2000, in Aspen, Colorado. Their son was born in January 2004. The couple announced their separation in August 2006; Robinson filed for divorce that November, citing irreconcilable differences. The divorce was finalized on October 22, 2007.

Before her marriage, Hudson dated actor Matt LeBlanc for at least one year beginning in 1995.

In 2010, Hudson began dating Muse lead vocalist and guitarist Matt Bellamy. They became engaged in April 2011, three months before the birth of their son. The couple broke up in 2014 and remain on good terms.

In December 2016, Hudson began dating Danny Fujikawa, a musician, actor, and co-owner of a record company. They met through her best friends, Sara and Erin Foster, who are his stepsisters. Their daughter was born in October 2018. They announced their engagement in September 2021.

While attending different high schools, Hudson has been friends with American musician Adam Levine since they were teenagers.

Hudson sued the British version of National Enquirer in 2006 after it reported she had an eating disorder, describing her as "painfully thin". Hudson said the tabloid's statements were "a blatant lie" and she was concerned about the impact the false report could have on impressionable young women. The newspaper apologized and compensated her.

Hudson practices Transcendental Meditation. In 2016, Hudson said: "Meditation has been the most helpful and life-changing thing for me. You can feel the difference when you meditate on a regular basis. At least I can... I started practicing Transcendental Meditation a year and a half ago so I meditate 20 minutes in the morning and I try to do another 20 minutes in the afternoon."

== Filmography ==
=== Film ===
List of films and roles
Year	Title	Role	Notes
1998	Desert Blue	Skye Davidson	
1999	200 Cigarettes	Cindy	
2000	Dr. T & the Women	Dee Dee Travis	
2000	Almost Famous	Penny Lane	
2000	Gossip	Naomi Preston	
2000	About Adam	Lucy Owens	
2001	Ricochet River	Lorna	
2002	The Four Feathers	Ethne Eustace	
2003	Le Divorce	Isabel Walker	
2003	Alex & Emma	Emma Dinsmore / Ylva / Elsa / Eldora / Anna	
2003	How to Lose a Guy in 10 Days	Andie Anderson	
2004	Raising Helen	Helen Harris	
2005	The Skeleton Key	Caroline Ellis	
2006	You, Me and Dupree	Molly Peterson	
2008	Fool's Gold	Tess Finnegan	
2008	My Best Friend's Girl	Alexis	
2009	Bride Wars	Liv Lerner	Also producer
2009	Nine	Stephanie Necrophuros	
2010	The Killer Inside Me	Amy Stanton	
2011	A Little Bit of Heaven	Marley Corbett	
2011	Something Borrowed	Darcy Rhone	
2012	The Reluctant Fundamentalist	Erica	
2014	Wish I Was Here	Sarah Bloom	
2014	Good People	Anna Wright	
2015	Rock the Kasbah	Merci	
2016	Kung Fu Panda 3	Mei Mei	Voice
2016	Mother's Day	Jesse Kohli	
2016	Deepwater Horizon	Felicia Williams	
2017	Marshall	Eleanor Strubing	
2021	Music	Kazu "Zu" Gamble	
2021	Mona Lisa and the Blood Moon	Bonnie "Bonnie Belle" Hunt	
2022	Glass Onion: A Knives Out Mystery	Birdie Jay	
2022	A Little White Lie	Simone Cleary	
2024	Shell	Zoe Shannon	
2025	Song Sung Blue	Claire Sardina	
2027	Hello & Paris		Filming

=== Television ===
List of television appearances and roles
Year	Title	Role	Notes
1996	Party of Five	Cory	Episode: "Spring Breaks: Part 1"
1997	EZ Streets	Larraine Cahill	Episode: "Neither Have I Wings to Fly"
2000	Saturday Night Live	Herself	Host; episode: "Kate Hudson / Radiohead"
2005	I'm Still Here: Real Diaries of Young People Who Lived During the Holocaust	Eva Ginz	Voice; television special
2012–2013	Glee	Cassandra July	5 episodes
2013	Clear History	Rhonda Haney	Television film
2015	Jamie & Jimmy's Friday Night Feast	Herself	Episode: "Kate Hudson"
2015	Barely Famous	Herself	Episode: "Barely Famous"
2015	Running Wild with Bear Grylls	Herself	Episode: "Kate Hudson: Dolomites"
2022	Truth Be Told	Micah Keith	10 episodes
2022	Gutsy	Herself	Docu-series; 2 episodes
2025	The Voice	Herself	Advisor for Team Adam (Season 27)
2025–present	Running Point	Isla Gordon	Main role; 20 episodes

=== Other credits ===
List of films directed, produced and written by
Year	Title	Role	Notes
2005	14 Hours	Executive producer	Uncredited
2007	Cutlass	Director and writer	Directorial debut; short film
2015	Bride Wars	Executive producer	

== Discography ==
=== Studio albums ===
Title	Album details	Peak positions		
Title	Album details	US Heatseekers	UK Digital	UK Indie
Glorious	Released: May 17, 2024; Labels: HK Music; Format: CD, vinyl, digital download	3	81	28

=== Singles ===
Title	Year	Peak positions UK Digital	Album
"Talk About Love"	2024	–	Glorious
"Live Forever"	2024	–	Glorious
"Gonna Find Out"	2024	–	Glorious
"Voices Carry"	2024	–	Non-album singles
"Have Yourself a Merry Little Christmas"	2024	–	Non-album singles
"Right on Time"	2025	99	Glorious deluxe edition

== Published works ==
- Hudson, Kate (2016). Pretty Happy: Healthy Ways to Love Your Body. Farrar, Straus and Giroux. ISBN 978-0-06-243424-1.
- Hudson, Kate (2017). Pretty Fun: Creating and Celebrating a Lifetime of Tradition. HarperCollins. ISBN 978-0-06-268576-6.
