= Cutlass (film) =

- Film poster
- Directed by: Kate Hudson
- Written by: Kate Hudson
- Produced by: Kevin Chinoy
- Starring: Virginia Madsen; Dakota Fanning; Kristen Stewart
- Cinematography: Dan Mindel
- Edited by: Trish Fuller
- Music by: Scott Hardkiss
- Release date: October 16, 2007
- Running time: 16 minutes
- Country: United States
- Language: English

Cutlass is a 2007 American drama short film written and directed by Kate Hudson in her directorial debut. It was filmed as part of Glamour magazine's Reel Moments series. Cutlass was nominated for Best Narrative Short at the 2009 Tribeca Film Festival. Its cast includes Dakota Fanning, Virginia Madsen, Kurt Russell, Kristen Stewart, Chevy Chase, and Sarah Roemer.

== Plot ==
Lacy, a young songwriter, discovers a great but expensive guitar in a music shop. She is excited by the guitar, and asks her mother, Robin, to buy it. However, her mother says "absolutely not", but after that she reminiscences about the time back in 1979 when she got an Olds Cutlass as her first car. Her father used to say: "Whatever makes you happy, makes me happy". Maybe... in the end... she'll change her mind about Lacy's wish.

== Cast ==
- Virginia Madsen as Robin
  - Kristen Stewart as Young Robin
- Dakota Fanning as Lacy
- Kurt Russell as Dad
- Sarah Roemer as Eve
- Brian Hooks as Leroy the Mechanic
- Chevy Chase as Stan
- Ethan Suplee as Bruce
- Steve Jones as Jonesy
- Dax Shepard and Michael Rosenbaum as background extras
