= Fool's Gold (2008 film) =

American romantic action comedy film

- Theatrical release poster
- Directed by: Andy Tennant
- Written by: Andy Tennant; John Claflin; Daniel Zelman
- Produced by: Donald De Line; Bernie Goldmann; Jon Klane
- Starring: Matthew McConaughey; Kate Hudson; Donald Sutherland; Ewen Bremner; Alexis Dziena; Kevin Hart; Ray Winstone
- Cinematography: Don Burgess
- Edited by: Troy Takaki; Tracey Wadmore-Smith
- Music by: George Fenton
- Production company: De Line Pictures
- Distributed by: Warner Bros. Pictures
- Release date: February 8, 2008
- Running time: 112 minutes
- Country: United States
- Language: English
- Budget: $70 million
- Box office: $111.2 million

Fool's Gold is a 2008 American romantic action comedy film directed by Andy Tennant and reunites the How to Lose a Guy in 10 Days stars Matthew McConaughey and Kate Hudson.

The plot follows Finn and Tess who, shortly after getting a divorce, rekindle their romantic life while searching for a lost treasure.

Fool's Gold was released by Warner Bros. Pictures on February 8, 2008. Although receiving negative reviews from critics, the film grossed $111.2 million worldwide on a $70 million budget.

== Plot ==
For years, treasure hunter Ben "Finn" Finnegan has been searching for the sunken Spanish galleon, the Aurelia, that was lost at sea with the 1715 Treasure Fleet, known as the Queen's Dowry. His boat inadvertently blows up on the surface, just as he and his assistant Alfonz find a fragment of dishware showing the family crest of one of the captains of the fleet. Finn appeals to his creditor Bigg Bunny for more funds to help find the Queen's Dowry, but Bigg wants the treasure for himself and keeps the fragment.

Finn's ex Tess is working as a steward on a yacht owned by multi-millionaire Nigel Honeycutt. She asks him to stop briefly in Key West to finalize their divorce. As they wait for Finn, Tess reveals they met while she was on spring break in Florida, derailing her completion of a PhD. Finn's delay, caused by Bigg Bunny's henchmen, makes him unable to stop the proceedings.

Upon entering the judge's chambers, Finn declares he objects to the divorce, as he and Tess still love each other. Moreover, he promises to do what it takes to keep them together, including marriage counselling. When Tess mentions moving to Chicago, he vacilates, so her lawyer declares the divorce became binding one minute before he entered the chambers.

Regardless, Finn catches up with Tess, excitedly telling her they found the missing treasure. To prove it, he sketches the Vangor family crest logo which had been stamped on the back of the plate. When Finn cannot produce the plate, Tess blows up at him.

Calling him a liar, Tess declares she will not waste any more time, as she already lost eight years. She plans on finishing her PhD, dedicating herself to teaching and writing and finding a new, improved man. To pay tuition, Tess wants to fix up and sell the boat, so she knocks out Finn upon learning it sank.

Meeting with Alfonz in town, Finn reminds him of their need of funding to find the treasure. His assistant points out the almost-billionnaire Nigel Honeycott's yacht is nearby. There, Tess tries to persuade her boss to weigh anchor, but his daughter Gemma is expected.

Finn dramatically saves a flyaway hat belonging to Gemma. He is taken aboard the yacht and shocks Tess upon seeing him. Once she has composed herself, they tell Nigel and Gemma about the fabled Queen's Dowry, and persuade them to fund the search. Tess and Finn find and follow clues to an ancient church and discover a diary describing the treasure's location. They celebrate by having passionate sex. Unfortunately, Bigg has been following them and he takes Tess hostage.

Finn enlists his former mentor Moe Fitch to help. They rescue Tess but Bigg kidnaps her again onto his plane. Gemma gets Finn to the plane on her jet ski, and he leaps onto the plane's pontoon as it takes flight. As Bigg attempts to shoot Finn, Tess kicks him out of the plane to his death. In the end, the treasure is displayed in Moe's museum, now renamed the Fitch-Finnegan Maritime Museum. Tess and Finn are back together, and she is shown to be pregnant.

== Cast ==
- Matthew McConaughey as Finn
- Kate Hudson as Tess
- Donald Sutherland as Nigel Honeycutt
- Alexis Dziena as Gemma Honeycutt
- Ray Winstone as Moe Fitch
- Kevin Hart as Bigg Bunny
- Ewen Bremner as Alfonz
- Brian Hooks as Curtis
- Malcolm-Jamal Warner as Cordell
- Michael Mulheren as Eddie
- Adam LeFevre as Gary
- Rohan Nichol as Stefan
- David Roberts as Cyrus
- Roger Sciberras as Andras
- Dan Mewing as Pilot

== Production ==
Warner Bros. Pictures and director Andy Tennant planned to shoot the film in the Caribbean, but decided on Queensland, Australia because the hurricane season in the Caribbean was likely to stall production of the film. The Key West scenes were filmed in Port Douglas. Filming also took place in Brisbane, the Gold Coast, Hamilton Island, Lizard Island, Airlie Beach, and Hervey Bay. Scenes were also filmed at Batt Reef, where Steve Irwin died from a stingray barb in 2006.

Inside scenes were shot on a sound stage at the Warner Bros studio facility and the actors and crew stayed in luxury homes and apartments on the Gold Coast. McConaughey mentioned having a python in the backyard of his house in Port Douglas. McConaughey said, "There were other days like the day we went out diving and swam with a dugong, which was very cool."

Two crew members were stung by Irukandji jellyfish during filming, so some of the water scenes were shot in the Caribbean because the actors were so frightened.

At the time of filming, The Precious Gem luxury motor yacht in the film was called the Keri Lee and has subsequently been renamed "Penny Mae". It was designed by yacht architect Ward Setzer of Setzer Design Group and originally named Status Quo.

=== 2011 lawsuit ===
Warner Brothers Entertainment, Inc., was sued in 2011 by Canadian novelist Lou Boudreau, in Canadian court, alleging copyright infringement by Tennant and two other men over the authorship of the script. Warner Brothers did not comment on the matter.

== Reception ==
=== Box office ===
Fool's Gold was released on February 8, 2008, in the North America and grossed $21.5 million in 3,125 theaters its opening weekend, ranking #1 at the box office. The film grossed over $110.5 million worldwide — $70.2 million in the North America and $40.3 million in other territories.

=== Critical response ===
On the review aggregator website Rotten Tomatoes, 11% of 147 critics' reviews are positive, with an average rating of 3.6/10. The website's consensus reads: "With little chemistry among the performers, humorless gags, and a predictable storyline, Fool's Gold fails on every level." Metacritic, which uses a weighted average, assigned the film a score of 29 out of 100, based on 29 critics, indicating "generally unfavorable" reviews. Audiences surveyed by CinemaScore gave the film an average grade of "B−" on an A+ to F scale.

Several critics compared the film unfavorably to National Treasure and Romancing the Stone. Some critics referred to the film as "tedious" and "listless." Peter Travers of Rolling Stone gave the film zero stars out of four and said "Paris Hilton's appalling The Hottie and the Nottie is "marginally better." Travers wrote "I defy any 2008 comedy to be as stupid, slack and sexless" as Fool's Gold. Carrie Rickey of The Philadelphia Inquirer gave the film one and a half stars out of four and said it "plays like a Three Stooges movie with scuba gear", but that "a Three Stooges movie is enlightened next to this one." Rickey described McConaughey as "perennially shirtless" and Hudson as "peculiarly mirthless".

Pete Vonder Haar of Film Threat gave the film one and a half stars and said "the resolution is never in doubt, the villains are comedic rather than menacing, and no one involved seems to care one way or the other that their names are attached to this indifferent mess." Vonder Haar said McConaughey plays Finn "as Sahara's Dirk Pitt minus the SEAL training and a few million brain cells." and asked "Does McConaughey have some codicil in his contract stipulating he must spend at least 51% of a movie shirtless?" Sid Smith of the Chicago Tribune gave it two stars out of four and said the characters "are comic book clichés". Smith said "the outcome is predictable" and "The wasted talents include Sutherland, affecting a hokey British accent, and hatchet-faced Ewen Bremner." Brian Lowry of Variety said, "The lure of Matthew McConaughey shirtless for extended stretches doubtless has some marketing value, but after that, Fool's Gold offers small compensation." Lowry wrote "At times the pic feels like a comedic version of The Deep, only without the comedy." Lowry said the tropic scenery was well-shot but said "there's not much chemistry" between McConaughey and Hudson.

Carina Chocano of the Los Angeles Times called it a "cheesy, familiar bore" and said it "feels at times like a third-rate Bond movie set to a Jimmy Buffett album." Chocano said "Hudson is the best thing about the movie. She has a likable, grounded presence and sharp comic timing." Nathan Rabin of The A.V. Club gave the film a "C+" and called it "the kind of thing people watch because it's the in-flight movie". Rabin called the repeated mentions of Finn's sexual prowess "a delightfully unnecessary move". Rabin said the film "outstays its welcome by a good 20 minutes" and called it "extravagantly stupid", but that the film's strengths were the "photogenic locales, obscenely beautiful stars, a laid-back soundtrack" and an unwillingness to take itself seriously. Brian Lowry said the ending is "a little more violent than necessary" and "a bit grittier than it should be tonally, as if we've detoured into a different movie." Simon Braund of Empire magazine gave the film one star out of five and called it "Absolute tosh. A ridiculous, unerringly tedious plot is weighed down by listless performances from a cast who clearly wished they were somewhere else, despite the sumptuous location."

The film earned a Razzie Award nomination for Kate Hudson as Worst Actress (also for My Best Friend's Girl).

=== Home media ===
Fool's Gold was released on DVD and Blu-ray discs on June 17, 2008. About 1,225,904 DVD units have been sold, acquiring revenue of $20,502,574. This does not include Blu-ray sales. It was presented in anamorphic widescreen with an English-language 5.1 digital surround soundtrack. The extras for the DVD include Flirting with Adventure McConaughey-Hudson chemistry featurette, and a gag reel. Fool's Gold was released on R4 Australian DVD on June 5, 2008.
