= Pennie Lane Trumbull =

American cultural figure

Pennie Trumbull
- Born: Pennie Ann Trumbull; July 3, 1954 (age 71); Portland, Oregon, U.S.
- Education: Roosevelt High School
- Spouse: Mink Stavenga (1983–divorced)
- Website: pennielane.com

Pennie Ann Trumbull (born July 3, 1954), also known as Pennie Lane, is an American socialite, philanthropist, businesswoman, and entrepreneur. During the 1970s, she formed The Flying Garter Girls, a group that traveled around the country as groupies for famous rock bands. She was "the main inspiration" for the character Penny Lane in the 2000 film Almost Famous, portrayed by actress Kate Hudson, and its 2019 stage musical adaptation, portrayed by Solea Pfeiffer.

== Biography ==
=== Early life ===
Trumbull was born and raised in Portland, Oregon. She was an only child and attended Roosevelt High School, where she was an award-winning equestrian and tried out for the Olympic team. Her love of music began at an early age, and she started attending concerts at 16. Trumbull moved to Los Angeles when she was 18 with a touring keyboardist for the band Steppenwolf, and returned to Portland a few months later.

=== The Flying Garter Girls ===
In the early 1970s, Trumbull became immersed in the rock music scene. She and four other girls decided to form a group and began pursuing bands. They each gave themselves nicknames, and Trumbull chose the name Pennie Lane in part from the song by the Beatles. The other girls in the group were Marvelous Meg, Sexy Sandy, The Real Camille, Miss Julia, and Caroline Can-Can. The girls had matchbooks made with "The Flying Garter Girls" printed on them to promote themselves.

=== Later life ===
Trumbull lived in San Diego for many years. She obtained her bachelor's degree in Business Administration from Cal State Northridge, where she was a competitive fencer, and an MBA in Marketing from Alliant International University in 1988. Trumbull owned her own marketing firm for a time. Upon her divorce in the early 1990s, she moved back home to be closer to her parents. Trumbull bought property on Sauvie Island near Portland, Oregon and built a ranch, which she describes as a "Rock n Roll Ranch." Lane owns her own wine label named Swallows and grows her own Pinot noir grapes. She continues to be involved in the music scene in the Portland area. Trumbull is an ordained minister and officiates weddings at her ranch.

Trumbull is a longtime member of the Sauvie Island Grange Association and various other community organizations.

== Almost Famous ==
Trumbull was "the main inspiration" for the character Penny Lane in the 2000 film Almost Famous. The film's director Cameron Crowe and Trumbull met and became friends in the 1970s while Crowe was working as a rock journalist for Rolling Stone. When he began work on his film about their experiences during that time, Almost Famous, Crowe asked for her permission to use her name and likeness.

In 2012, Trumbull was the special guest at the San Diego Film Festival, which featured a special screening of Almost Famous. She continues to make appearances discussing the film and her life in the 1970s.

== See also ==
- The GTOs
