= List of Anjelica Huston performances =

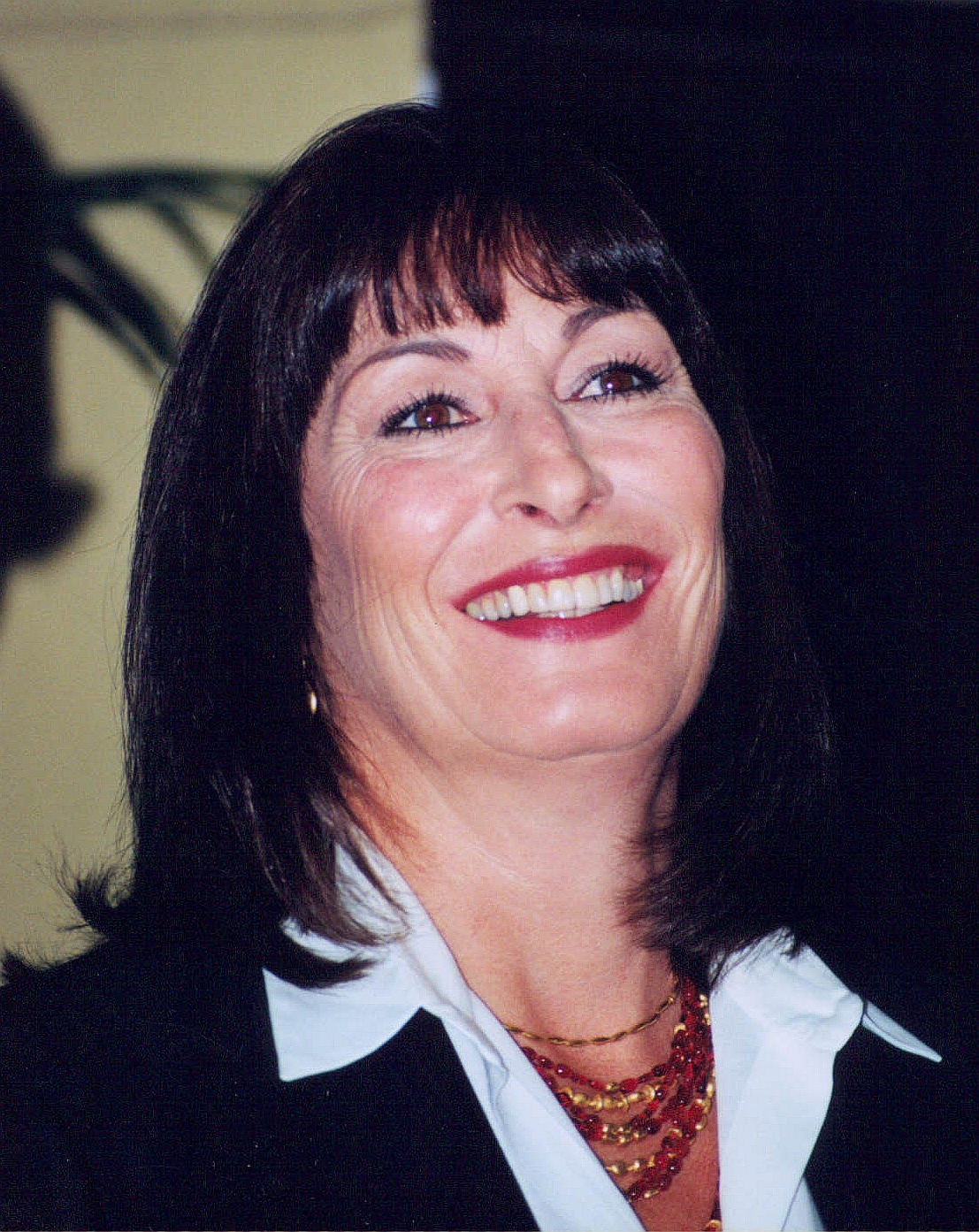
Huston in 2000

Anjelica Huston is an American actress, director and model with an extensive career in film and television. She has received multiple accolades, including an Academy Award and a Golden Globe Award, as well as nominations for three British Academy Film Awards and six Primetime Emmy Awards. The daughter of director John Huston and granddaughter of actor Walter Huston, she reluctantly made her big screen debut in her father's A Walk with Love and Death (1969). Huston moved from London to New York City, where she worked as a model throughout the 1970s. She decided to actively pursue acting in the early 1980s, and subsequently, had her breakthrough with her performance as a mobster moll in Prizzi's Honor (1985), also directed by her father, for which she became the third generation of her family to receive an Academy Award, when she won Best Supporting Actress, joining both John and Walter Huston in this recognition. She achieved further critical and popular recognition for playing a mistress in Crimes and Misdemeanors (1989), a long-vanished wife in Enemies, A Love Story (1989), a con artist in The Grifters (1990), the Grand High Witch in The Witches (1990), Morticia Addams in the Addams Family films (1991–93), and Baroness Rodmilla de Ghent in Ever After (1998). Huston directed the films Bastard Out of Carolina (1996) and Agnes Browne (1999); collaborated with director Wes Anderson in The Royal Tenenbaums (2001), The Life Aquatic with Steve Zissou (2004), and The Darjeeling Limited (2007).

== Filmography ==
Key
†	Denotes works that have not yet been released

=== Film ===
Year	Title	Role	Notes	Ref.
1969	A Walk with Love and Death	Claudia		
1975	One Flew Over the Cuckoo's Nest	Woman in Crowd on Pier	Uncredited Extra	
1976	Swashbuckler	Woman of Dark Visage		
1976	The Last Tycoon	Edna		
1981	The Postman Always Rings Twice	Madge Gorland		
1982	Rose for Emily	Miss Emily Grierson		
1982	Frances	Mental patient		
1984	This Is Spinal Tap	Polly Deutsch		
1984	The Ice Pirates	Maida		
1985	Prizzi's Honor	Maerose Prizzi	Academy Award for Best Supporting Actress winner	
1986	Captain EO	The Supreme Leader		
1987	Gardens of Stone	Samantha Davis		
1987	The Dead	Gretta Conroy		
1988	Mr. North	Persis Bosworth-Tennyson		
1988	A Handful of Dust	Mrs. Rattery		
1989	Crimes and Misdemeanors	Dolores Paley		
1989	Enemies, A Love Story	Tamara Broder		
1990	The Witches	Grand High Witch		
1990	The Grifters	Lilly Dillon		
1991	The Addams Family	Morticia Addams		
1992	The Player	Herself		
1993	Manhattan Murder Mystery	Marcia Fox		
1993	Addams Family Values	Morticia Addams		
1995	The Perez Family	Carmela Perez		
1995	The Crossing Guard	Mary		
1996	Bastard Out of Carolina	—N/a	Director	
1998	Phoenix	Leila		
1998	Ever After	Baroness Rodmilla de Ghent		
1998	Buffalo '66	Jan Brown		
1999	Agnes Browne	Agnes Browne	Also director and producer	
2000	The Golden Bowl	Fanny Assingham		
2001	The Man from Elysian Fields	Jennifer Adler		
2001	The Royal Tenenbaums	Etheline Tenenbaum		
2002	Barbie as Rapunzel	Gothel	Voice	
2002	Blood Work	Dr Bonnie Fox		
2003	Daddy Day Care	Miss Harridan		
2003	Kaena: The Prophecy	Queen of the Selenites	English version	
2004	The Life Aquatic with Steve Zissou	Eleanor Zissou		
2006	Art School Confidential	Art History Teacher		
2006	Material Girls	Fabiella Du Mont		
2006	Seraphim Falls	Madame Louise		
2006	These Foolish Things	Lottie Osgood		
2007	The Darjeeling Limited	Patricia Whitman		
2007	Martian Child	Tina		
2008	Choke	Ida Mancini		
2008	Tinker Bell	Queen Clarion	Voice	
2009	Tinker Bell and the Lost Treasure	Queen Clarion	Voice	
2010	A Cat in Paris	Claudine	Voice	
2010	When in Rome	Celeste		
2011	50/50	Diane Lerner		
2011	The Big Year	Annie Auklet		
2011	Horrid Henry: The Movie	Miss Battle-Axe		
2011	Pixie Hollow Games	Queen Clarion	Voice	
2012	Secret of the Wings	Queen Clarion	Voice	
2013	Pixie Hollow Bake Off	Queen Clarion	Voice; short film	
2014	The Pirate Fairy	Queen Clarion	Voice	
2015	Tinker Bell and the Legend of the NeverBeast	Queen Clarion	Voice	
2016	The Cleanse	Lily		
2017	Thirst Street	Narrator		
2017	Trouble	Maggie	Also executive producer	
2018	Isle of Dogs	(Mute) Poodle	Credit only	
2019	John Wick: Chapter 3 – Parabellum	The Director		
2019	Arctic Dogs	Magda	Voice	
2020	Waiting for Anya	Widow Horcada		
2020	Breaking the Chain	—N/a	Documentary; executive producer	
2021	The French Dispatch	Narrator	Voice	
2025	Ballerina	The Director		
TBA	The Christmas Witch Trial of La Befana †	Befana	Post-production	
TBA	Legacy †	TBA	Post-production	

=== Television ===
Year	Title	Role	Notes	Ref.
1982–1983	Laverne & Shirley	Geraldine; Miss Paris	2 episodes	
1986	Saturday Night Live	Co-host	Episode: "Anjelica Huston and Billy Martin/George Clinton & Parliament-Funkadelic"	
1988	Lonesome Dove	Clara Allen	4 episodes	
1992	Rabbit Ears: Rip Van Winkle	Storyteller		
1993	Family Pictures	Lainey Eberlin	Television film	
1993	And The Band Played On	Dr. Betsy Reisz	Television film	
1995	Buffalo Girls	Calamity Jane	Television miniseries	
2001	The Mists of Avalon	Viviane, Lady of the Lake	Television miniseries	
2002	Joan Crawford: The Ultimate Movie Star	Narrator	Documentary	
2004	Iron Jawed Angels	Carrie Chapman Catt	Television film	
2005	Riding the Bus with My Sister	—N/a	Television film; director	
2006	Covert One: The Hades Factor	President Castilla	Television miniseries	
2006	Huff	Dr. Lena Markova	4 episodes	
2008–2009	Medium	Cynthia Keener	8 episodes	
2011–2023	American Dad!	Superintendent Ellen Riggs (voice)	4 episodes	
2012–2013	Smash	Eileen Rand	32 episodes	
2014, 2020	BoJack Horseman	Angela Diaz (voice)	2 episodes	
2015–2016	Transparent	Vikki	7 episodes	
2016	All Hail King Julien	Julienne (voice)	5 episodes	
2016–2018	Trollhunters: Tales of Arcadia	Queen Usurna (voice)	15 episodes	
2017	The Watcher in the Woods	Mrs. Aylwood	Television film	
2017	Anjelica Huston on James Joyce	Herself	Documentary	
2018	Angie Tribeca	Anna Summour	Episode: "Just the Fat, Ma'am"	
2023	Star Wars: Visions	Sith Mother (voice)	Episode: "Screecher's Reach"	
2024	Star Wars: The Bad Batch	Lady Isa Durand (voice)	Episode: "Paths Unknown"	
2025	Towards Zero	Lady Tressilian	Three-part limited series	
2025	The Mighty Nein	Deirta (voice)	4 episodes	

== See also ==
- List of awards and nominations received by Anjelica Huston
