= List of awards and nominations received by Anjelica Huston =

Anjelica Huston awards and nominations
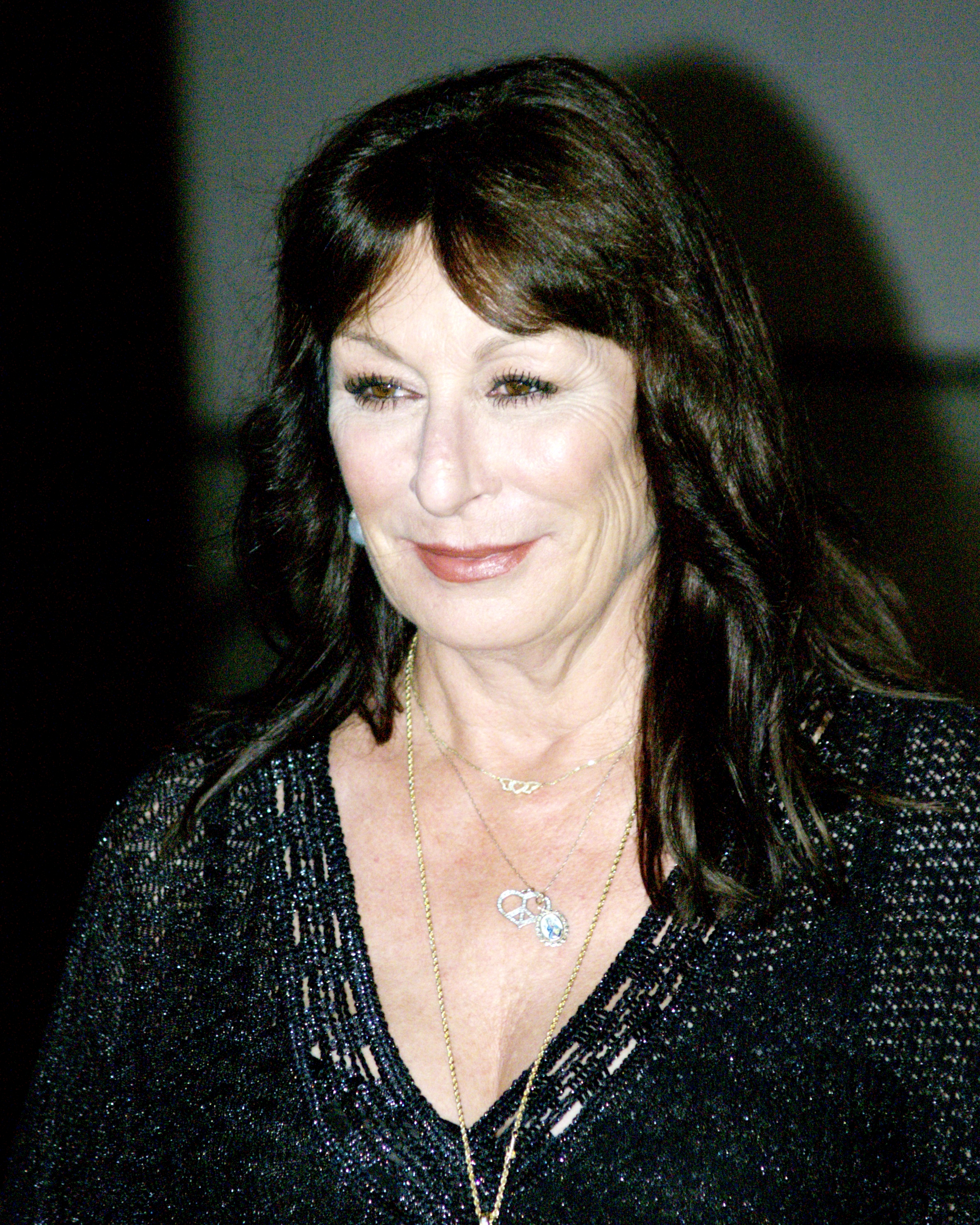
- Huston in 2010
Awards and nominations
Award	Wins	Nominations
Academy Awards	1	3
BAFTA Awards	0	3
Directors Guild of America Awards	0	1
Golden Globe Awards	1	8
Primetime Emmy Awards	0	6
Screen Actors Guild Awards	0	3

Totals (Note: Certain award groups do not simply award one winner. They acknowledge several different recipients, have runners-up, and have third place. Since this is a specific recognition and is different from losing an award, runner-up mentions are considered wins in this award tally. For simplification and to avoid errors, each award in this list has been presumed to have had a prior nomination.)
- Wins: 37
- Nominations: 73

Anjelica Huston is an American actress and filmmaker who has received numerous accolades throughout her career. Huston had her breakthrough role in the black comedy film Prizzi's Honor (1985), which won her the Academy Award for Best Supporting Actress, making her the third generation of her family to win an Oscar, following her father John and grandfather Walter Huston. For Prizzi's Honor, she was also nominated for a British Academy Film Award (BAFTA) and a Golden Globe Award. She received two additional Academy Award nominations for Enemies, A Love Story (1989) and The Grifters (1990), in the Best Supporting Actress and Best Actress categories, respectively. For her performances in the Woody Allen–directed films Crimes and Misdemeanors (1989) and Manhattan Murder Mystery (1993), she received two BAFTA Award for Best Actress in a Supporting Role nominations. She was also praised for her portrayal of the Grand High Witch in Roald Dahl's film adaptation The Witches (1990), earning a Saturn Award for Best Actress nomination, and for her interpretation of Morticia Addams in The Addams Family (1991) and its sequel Addams Family Values (1993), receiving two nominations for the Golden Globe Award for Best Actress in a Motion Picture – Musical or Comedy.

Huston made her directorial debut with the film Bastard Out of Carolina (1996), for which she earned nominations for a Directors Guild of America Award for Outstanding Directorial Achievement in Dramatic Specials and a Primetime Emmy Award for Outstanding Directing for a Limited Series or Movie. Her other television performances include the television film Iron Jawed Angels (2004), that won her the Golden Globe Award for Best Supporting Actress in a Series, Miniseries or Television Film, and Lonesome Dove (1989), Buffalo Girls (1995), The Mists of Avalon (2001), and Medium (2008–2009), for all of which she was nominated at the Primetime Emmy Awards.

== Awards and nominations ==
Awards and nominations received by Anjelica Huston
Award	Year (Note: Indicates the year of ceremony.)	Nominated work	Category	Result	Ref.
Academy Awards	1986	Prizzi's Honor	Best Supporting Actress	Won	
Academy Awards	1990	Enemies, A Love Story	Best Supporting Actress	Nominated	
Academy Awards	1991	The Grifters	Best Actress	Nominated	
American Comedy Awards	1994	Addams Family Values	Funniest Actress in a Motion Picture	Nominated	
Audie Awards	2020	More Bedtime Stories from Cynics	Humor	Won	
Blockbuster Entertainment Awards	1999	Ever After	Favorite Supporting Actress – Drama/Romance	Won	
Boston Society of Film Critics Awards	1986	Prizzi's Honor	Best Supporting Actress	Won	
Boston Society of Film Critics Awards	1991	The Grifters and The Witches	Best Actress	Won	
Boston Society of Film Critics Awards	2004	The Life Aquatic with Steve Zissou	Best Cast (Note: Shared with the cast)	Runner-up	
British Academy Film Awards	1986	Prizzi's Honor	Best Actress in a Supporting Role	Nominated	
British Academy Film Awards	1991	Crimes and Misdemeanors	Best Actress in a Supporting Role	Nominated	
British Academy Film Awards	1995	Manhattan Murder Mystery	Best Actress in a Supporting Role	Nominated	
Cannes Film Festival Awards	1996	Bastard Out of Carolina	Caméra d'Or	Nominated	
Chicago Film Critics Association Awards	1991	The Grifters	Best Actress	Nominated	
Chlotrudis Awards	1999	—	Chloe Award	Won	
Critics' Choice Movie Awards	2001	The Royal Tenenbaums	Best Acting Ensemble	Nominated	
Critics' Choice Movie Awards	2005	The Life Aquatic with Steve Zissou	Best Acting Ensemble	Nominated	
Critics' Choice Television Awards	2016	Transparent	Best Guest Performer in a Comedy Series	Nominated	
Directors Guild of America Awards	1997	Bastard Out of Carolina	Outstanding Directorial Achievement in Dramatic Specials	Nominated	
DVD Exclusive Awards	2003	Barbie as Rapunzel	Best Animated Character Performance	Won	
Fangoria Chainsaw Awards	1992	The Addams Family	Best Actress	Nominated	
Golden Apple Awards	1998	—	Female Star of the Year	Won	
Golden Globe Awards	1986	Prizzi's Honor	Best Supporting Actress in a Motion Picture	Nominated	
Golden Globe Awards	1990	Lonesome Dove	Best Supporting Actress in a Series, Miniseries or Television Film	Nominated	
Golden Globe Awards	1991	The Grifters	Best Actress in a Motion Picture – Drama	Nominated	
Golden Globe Awards	1992	The Addams Family	Best Actress in a Motion Picture – Musical or Comedy	Nominated	
Golden Globe Awards	1994	Addams Family Values	Best Actress in a Motion Picture – Musical or Comedy	Nominated	
Golden Globe Awards	1994	Family Pictures	Best Actress in a Miniseries or Television Film	Nominated	
Golden Globe Awards	1996	The Crossing Guard	Best Supporting Actress in a Motion Picture	Nominated	
Golden Globe Awards	2005	Iron Jawed Angels	Best Supporting Actress in a Series, Miniseries or Television Film	Won	
Gracie Awards	2013	Smash	Best Supporting Actress in a Drama Series	Won	
Hasty Pudding Theatricals Awards	2003	—	Woman of the Year	Won	
Independent Spirit Awards	1988	The Dead	Best Supporting Female	Won	
Independent Spirit Awards	1991	The Grifters	Best Female Lead	Won	
Independent Spirit Awards	2012	50/50	Best Supporting Female	Nominated	
Kansas City Film Critics Circle Awards	1985	Prizzi's Honor	Best Supporting Actress	Won	
Kansas City Film Critics Circle Awards	1989	Enemies, A Love Story	Best Supporting Actress	Won	
Locarno Film Festival Awards	2008	—	Excellence Award	Won	
Los Angeles Film Critics Association Awards	1985	Prizzi's Honor	Best Supporting Actress	Won	
Los Angeles Film Critics Association Awards	1989	Enemies, A Love Story	Best Supporting Actress	Runner-up	
Los Angeles Film Critics Association Awards	1990	The Grifters and The Witches	Best Actress	Won	
MTV Movie & TV Awards	1992	The Addams Family	Best Kiss (Note: Shared with Raul Julia)	Nominated	
National Board of Review Awards	1985	Prizzi's Honor	Best Supporting Actress	Won	
National Society of Film Critics Awards	1986	Prizzi's Honor	Best Supporting Actress	Won	
National Society of Film Critics Awards	1988	The Dead	Best Supporting Actress	Runner-up	
National Society of Film Critics Awards	1990	Enemies, A Love Story	Best Supporting Actress	Won	
National Society of Film Critics Awards	1991	The Grifters and The Witches	Best Actress	Won	
New York Film Critics Circle Awards	1986	Prizzi's Honor	Best Supporting Actress	Won	
New York Film Critics Circle Awards	1988	The Dead	Best Supporting Actress	Runner-up	
New York Film Critics Circle Awards	1991	The Grifters	Best Actress	Runner-up	
New York Women in Film & Television Awards	1999	—	Muse Award	Won	
Primetime Emmy Awards	1989	Lonesome Dove	Outstanding Lead Actress in a Limited Series or Movie	Nominated	
Primetime Emmy Awards	1995	Buffalo Girls	Outstanding Lead Actress in a Limited Series or Movie	Nominated	
Primetime Emmy Awards	1997	Bastard Out of Carolina	Outstanding Directing for a Limited Series or Movie	Nominated	
Primetime Emmy Awards	2002	The Mists of Avalon	Outstanding Supporting Actress in a Limited Series or Movie	Nominated	
Primetime Emmy Awards	2004	Iron Jawed Angels	Outstanding Supporting Actress in a Limited Series or Movie	Nominated	
Primetime Emmy Awards	2008	Medium	Outstanding Guest Actress in a Drama Series	Nominated	
San Francisco International Film Festival Awards	1991	—	Piper-Heidsieck Award	Won	
San Sebastián International Film Festival Awards	1999	—	Donostia Award	Won	
Satellite Awards	2002	The Royal Tenenbaums	Best Supporting Actress in a Motion Picture – Comedy or Musical	Nominated	
Satellite Awards	2005	Iron Jawed Angels	Best Supporting Actress in a Series, Miniseries or Television Film	Won	
Satellite Awards	2008	Choke	Best Supporting Actress in a Motion Picture	Nominated	
Saturn Awards	1991	The Witches	Best Actress	Nominated	
Saturn Awards	1994	Addams Family Values	Best Actress	Nominated	
Saturn Awards	1999	Ever After	Best Supporting Actress	Nominated	
Screen Actors Guild Awards	1996	The Crossing Guard	Outstanding Performance by a Female Actor in a Supporting Role	Nominated	
Screen Actors Guild Awards	1996	Buffalo Girls	Outstanding Performance by a Female Actor in a Miniseries or Television Movie	Nominated	
Screen Actors Guild Awards	2002	The Mists of Avalon	Outstanding Performance by a Female Actor in a Miniseries or Television Movie	Nominated	
ShoWest Awards	1990	—	Female Star of the Year	Won	
Sundance Film Festival Awards	2008	Choke	Special Jury Prize for Work by an Ensemble Cast	Won	
Taormina International Film Festival Awards	2004	—	Taormina Arte Award	Won	
Taos Talking Pictures Film Festival Awards	2000	—	Maverick Award	Won	
Women in Film Crystal + Lucy Awards	1996	—	Crystal Award	Won	
