= Anjelica Huston =

American actress (born 1951)

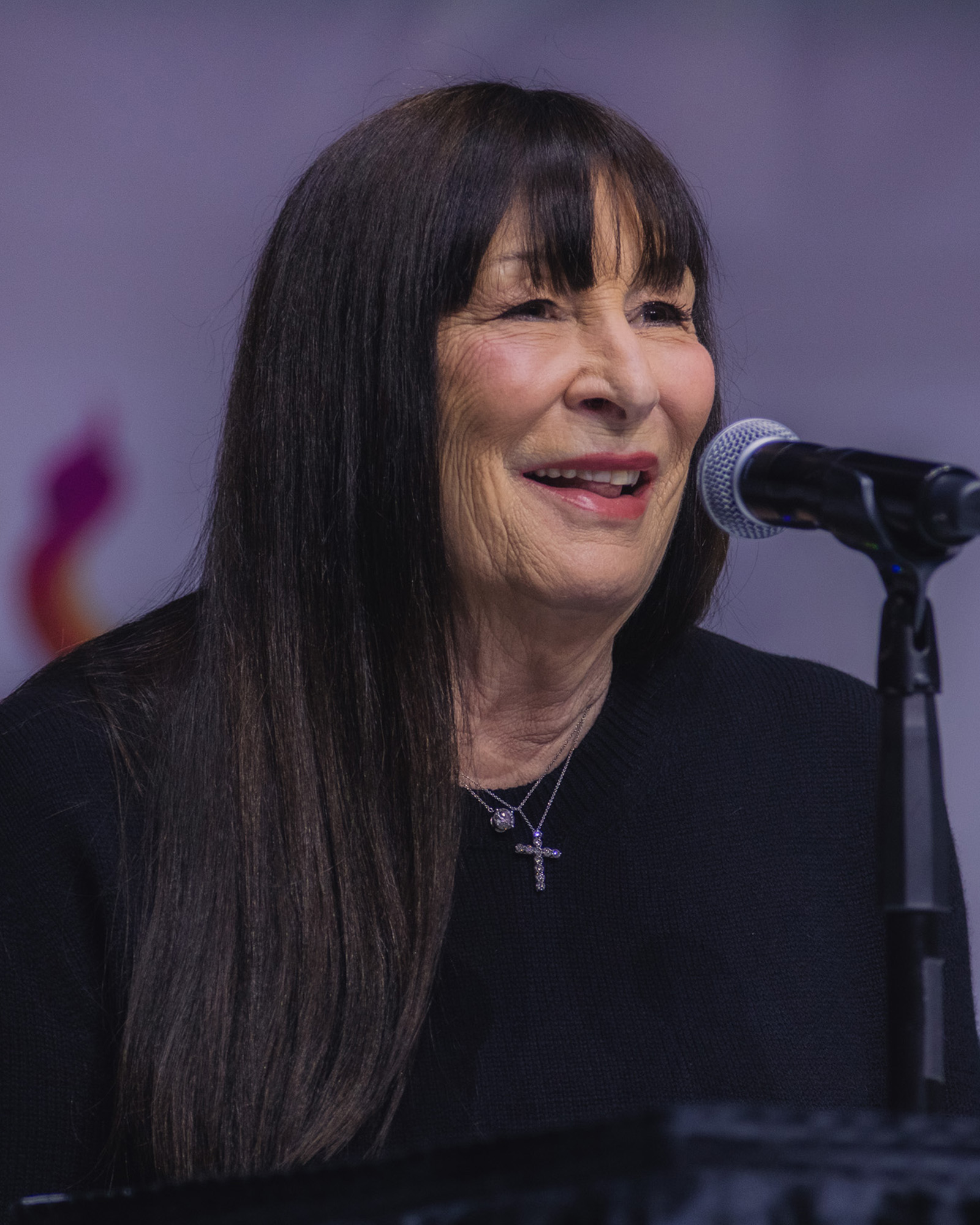
- Huston in 2024
- Born: July 8, 1951 (age 75); Los Angeles, California, U.S.
- Occupation: Actress
- Years active: 1968–present
- Works: Full list
- Spouse: Robert Graham (m. 1992; died 2008)
- Partners: Bob Richardson (1969–1973); Jack Nicholson (1973–1990)
- Parents: John Huston; Enrica Soma
- Relatives: Tony Huston (brother); Allegra Huston (half-sister); Danny Huston (half-brother); Jack Huston (nephew); Walter Huston (grandfather)
- Awards: Full list

Anjelica Huston (/ˈhjuːstən/ HEW-stən; born July 8, 1951) is an American actress. Known for often portraying eccentric and distinctive characters, she has received multiple accolades, including an Academy Award and a Golden Globe Award, as well as nominations for three British Academy Film Awards and six Primetime Emmy Awards. In 2010, Huston was awarded a star on the Hollywood Walk of Fame.

The daughter of director John Huston and granddaughter of actor Walter Huston, Huston reluctantly made her big screen debut in her father's A Walk with Love and Death (1969). She moved from London to New York City, where she worked as a model throughout the 1970s. Huston decided to pursue acting in the early 1980s and had her breakthrough with her performance as a mobster moll in Prizzi's Honor (1985), also directed by her father, for which Huston became the third generation of her family to receive an Oscar, when she won the Academy Award for Best Supporting Actress, joining both John and Walter Huston in this recognition.

Huston achieved further critical and popular recognition for playing an accomplished horse breeder on the Nebraska plains, Clara Allen, on the hit TV mini-series Lonesome Dove, a mistress in Crimes and Misdemeanors (1989), a long-vanished wife in Enemies, A Love Story (1989), a con artist in The Grifters (1990), the Grand High Witch in The Witches (1990), Morticia Addams in the Addams Family films (1991–1993), and an adventurous writer in Manhattan Murder Mystery (1993). She collaborated with director Wes Anderson in The Royal Tenenbaums (2001), The Life Aquatic with Steve Zissou (2004), and The Darjeeling Limited (2007); and lent her voice to several animated films, mainly the Tinker Bell series (2008–2015). Huston's other notable film credits include The Crossing Guard (1995), Ever After (1998), Daddy Day Care (2003), Choke (2008), 50/50 (2011) and John Wick: Chapter 3 – Parabellum (2019).

On television, Huston has also acted in Family Pictures (1993), Buffalo Girls (1995), The Mists of Avalon (2001), Huff (2006), Medium (2008–2009), Transparent (2015–2016), and Towards Zero (2025). She won a Golden Globe for playing Carrie Chapman Catt in the cable film Iron Jawed Angels (2004), and a Gracie Award for her portrayal of Eileen Rand in Smash (2012–2013). Huston directed the films Bastard Out of Carolina (1996) and Agnes Browne (1999) and wrote the memoirs A Story Lately Told (2013) and Watch Me (2014).

== Early life ==
Huston was born on July 8, 1951, in the Cedars of Lebanon Hospital, in Los Angeles, to director and actor John Huston and prima ballerina and model Enrica Soma. According to Huston, "the news of my arrival was cabled promptly to the post office in the township of Butiaba, in Western Uganda [and two] days later, a barefoot runner bearing a telegram finally arrived at Murchison Falls", where her father was filming The African Queen (1951). Huston's paternal grandfather was Canadian-born actor Walter Huston. She has Scottish, Irish, English and Welsh ancestry from her father, and Italian from her mother.

When Huston was two years old, her family relocated to Ireland, where she spent much of her childhood and which she still considers home. Huston's parents rented what Huston called the "Courtown House"—a tall stone Victorian manor in County Kildare—for three years, before John Huston bought St. Clerans, a 110-acre estate in County Galway, in 1954. She attended school at Kylemore Abbey, and later attended Holland Park School after relocating to England.

Huston has a complex family because of her parents' multiple marriages and extramarital affairs. She has an older brother, Tony, and an adopted older brother, Pablo. Huston has a younger maternal half-sister named Allegra, whom she called "Legs", and a younger paternal half-brother, actor Danny Huston. She is the aunt of actor Jack Huston. Huston once described herself as a "lonely child", explaining: "My brother Tony and I were never very close, neither as children nor as adults, but I was tightly bound to him. We were forced to be together because we were really quite alone. We were in the middle of the Irish countryside ... and we didn't see many other kids. We were tutored. Our father was mostly away [for filming]".

== Career ==
=== Screen debut and modeling (1968–1975) ===
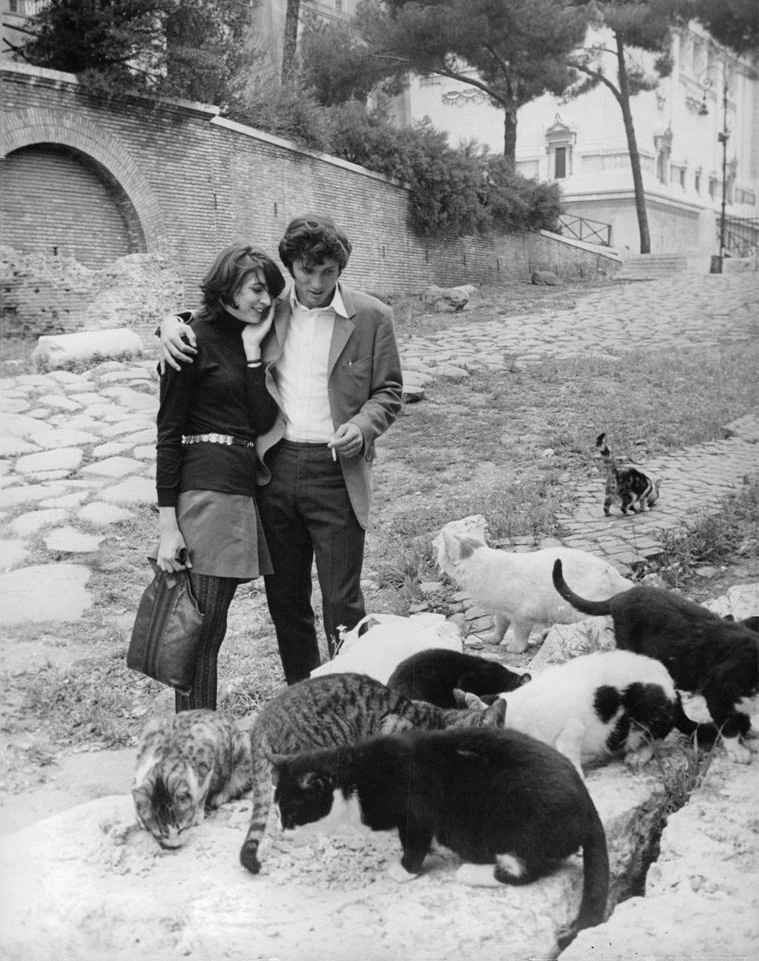
Huston with Assi Dayan on the set of A Walk with Love and Death (1969)

Her father's film A Walk with Love and Death (1969), where Huston played the 16-year-old French noblewoman Claudia opposite Assi Dayan, marked her screen debut. She had been in the running to play Juliet in director Franco Zeffirelli's adaptation of Romeo and Juliet (1968), but Huston withdrew herself from consideration when her father decided to cast her as Claudia in A Walk With Love and Death. Huston felt that she was wrong for the role as Claudia, and has commented on the experience that her father "miscast me first time out and I think he realized that. I was ready to act, but I wasn't ready to act for him ... I was difficult, I didn't want to act with no makeup, although I'd have done it for Franco." Father and daughter had a fractious relationship on set, with the young Anjelica having difficulty learning her lines and focusing, while her father grew more impatient and angry at directing her. Critics derided her performance.

Huston and her mother were photographed by Arnaud De Rosnay—whom she met at age 16 in Switzerland—in October 1968 for Vogue. Shortly afterwards, her mother died in a car accident, and the young Huston relocated to New York City as she "sort of fled London because of the memories; I didn't really know what to do with myself, and I wasn't quite sure what my father's intentions were for me—whether he was going to put me in a convent or launch me as an actress. Well, he'd already tried to do that, and we'd had a hard time on the making of that first film we did together". Inspired by models Jean Shrimpton and Twiggy, Huston decided to pursue modelling, and through photographer Richard Avedon, a friend of her parents, she met Diana Vreeland, who proposed to Huston her first American Vogue photoshoot, which took place in Ireland. She described it as "very innovative because they presaged the whole sort of Gypsy look".

Huston became a frequent subject of Bob Richardson, with whom she lived until 1973. She was signed to Ford Models and in the early 1970s, worked in Europe "for a couple of years". Huston walked the runway for brands such as Zandra Rhodes, Yamamoto, Armani and Valentino. Along with Pat Cleveland, Pat Ast, Elsa Peretti, Karen Bjornson and Alva Chinn, she became one of fashion designer Halston's favored troupe of models, nicknamed the Halstonettes.

=== Transition to film and breakthrough (1976–1988) ===
After breaking up with Richardson, Huston moved to California to focus on acting. While she "didn't do much there for three years", Huston filmed a small role in The Last Tycoon (1976), based on F. Scott Fitzgerald's novel of the same name and starring then-boyfriend Jack Nicholson. Bob Rafelson's remake The Postman Always Rings Twice (1981), based on the novel by James M. Cain, featured Huston as the fling of a Depression-era drifter, played by Nicholson. She briefly appeared in the drama Frances (1982) and the mockumentary This Is Spinal Tap (1984) before obtaining a larger role in the science fiction film The Ice Pirates (1984).

Her father cast Huston as Maerose, the daughter of a New York Mafia clan head whose love is scorned by a hit man, in the film adaptation Prizzi's Honor (1985), which also starred Nicholson. She was paid the SAG scale rate of US$14,000 for her role. When Huston's agent called up the movie's producer to request if she could be paid more, she was told: "Go to hell. Be my guest—ask for more money. We don't even want her in this movie." Huston, who was not only John Huston's daughter but also Jack Nicholson's girlfriend at the time, wrote in her 2014 memoir Watch Me that she later overheard a production worker saying: "Her father is the director, her boyfriend's the star, and she has no talent." Nevertheless, Huston garnered positive notices for her performance. The New York Times described her part as a "wonderful character, far darker and more complex than is indicated by her self-deprecating wisecracks (I'm a family scandal. I got a reputation to keep up). She's a riveting presence and if Miss Huston, the daughter of the director, doesn't get an Oscar nomination for this performance, I'll be very surprised." Huston won the Academy Award for Best Supporting Actress, making her the third generation of her family to win an Oscar.

Huston starred opposite Michael Jackson in the 17-minute US$30 million 3D film Captain EO, written by George Lucas and directed by Francis Ford Coppola, which ran from 1986 at Disneyland and Epcot, and later at Tokyo Disneyland and Euro Disneyland. Coppola next cast her as the girlfriend of an army platoon sergeant in Gardens of Stone (1987), a film that dealt with the effect of the Vietnam War on the United States homefront. Film critic Roger Ebert praised her onscreen chemistry with co-star James Caan, remarking that "the romance between Caan and Huston is one of the great adult love stories in recent movies".

Huston starred in her father's last film, 1987's The Dead, as the wife of an academic. According to Huston, her father remained a filmmaking virtuoso despite his ill health: "He was so sick, but he could literally do it with his eyes closed. He knew when we were going to get a take way long before the camera rolled. I mean the timing was so precise that he could tell everything, exactly how it was going to go." The pressures of filming and watching her father's health deteriorate had an adverse effect on Anjelica Huston's own health, developing Epstein-Barr syndrome during production. John died nearly four months before the film's release date, upon which it received two nominations at the 60th Academy Awards. For her performance, Huston won as Best Supporting Female at the 3rd Independent Spirit Awards.

In 1988, Huston played the love interest of an engaging, multi-talented, middle-class Yale University graduate in Mr. North, which was more of a family project, directed by half-brother Danny Huston, and made a cameo appearance in the film adaptation A Handful of Dust. Despite her limited screen time, Vincent Canby of The New York Times praised her portrayal in the latter as the "single most stunning performance" but called the film "both too literal and devoid of real point."

=== Critical and popular recognition (1989–1995) ===
Huston earned a BAFTA nomination for Best Supporting Actress for her portrayal of a flight attendant having an affair with a respected family guy in Woody Allen's dramedy Crimes and Misdemeanors (1989). The drama Enemies, A Love Story, also released in 1989, featured her as the long-vanished wife of a Holocaust survivor. In a positive review for the film, Roger Ebert asserted: "Parts, especially the scenes with Huston, are heartwarming in a strange way, because they show one human being accepting the weaknesses of another". For her role, Huston received an Academy Award nomination for Best Supporting Actress.

In The Witches (1990), based on the 1983 book of the same name by Roald Dahl, Huston starred as the Grand High Witch, the all-powerful leader of the world's witches, sharing the cast with Mai Zetterling and Rowan Atkinson. She and the costume designer Marit Allen originally brought a different dress for the role, but the director Nicolas Roeg rejected it as "not sexy". Huston recalled: "That was the first time I'd imagined that this horrible creature in a children's movie should have sex appeal. It simply had not occurred to me. But of course, Nic was absolutely right. His vision was diabolical and dark and brilliantly funny. If a witch was to be at the center of this plot, she needed to be sexy to hold the eye." The character's monstrous version was prepared by Jim Henson's Creature Shop and "took over six hours to apply and almost as much time to remove at the end of the day." Despite a lackluster box office response, the film was applauded by critics and has obtained a cult following over the years; it has also remained one of Huston's favorite roles.

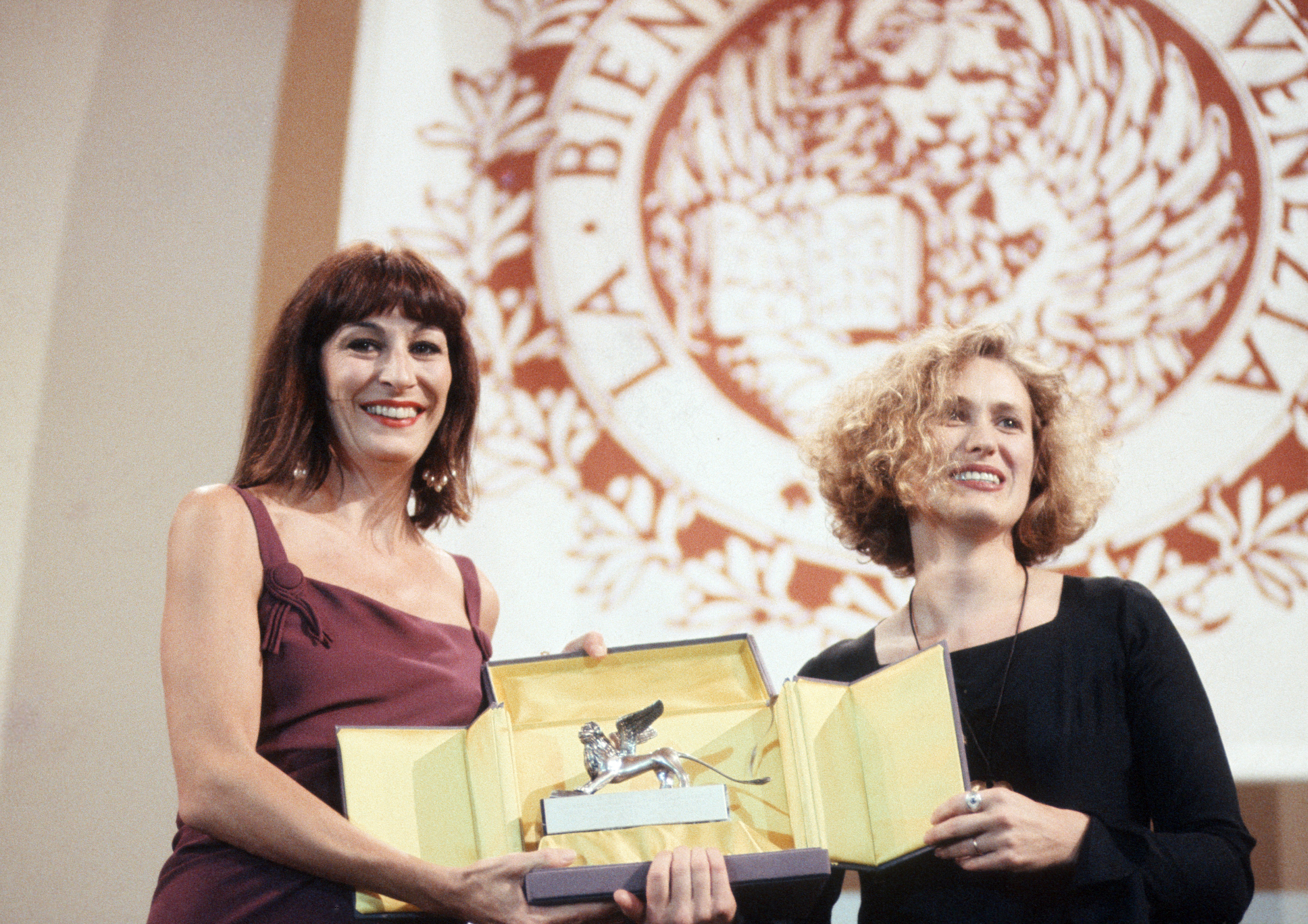
Huston presenting Jane Campion with the Grand Jury Prize at the 47th Venice International Film Festival in 1990

Huston next portrayed a veteran con artist in the neo-noir thriller The Grifters (also 1990). Director Stephen Frears first contacted her about playing Lilly in 1989 while she was filming Crimes and Misdemeanors, but after reading the script, she was unsure. Although Huston was "transfixed" by the story and the character, the script alarmed her with its explicitness. A few months later, Frears contacted Huston again to see if she was still interested. Still wavering, Huston's talent agent Sue Mengers told her bluntly: "Anjelica, if Stephen Frears tells you he wants you to shit in the corner, then that's what you must do." The next day, Huston auditioned for the role in front of Frears at the Chateau Marmont. Frears' initial reluctance to cast Huston because she looked too much like "a lady", was resolved with the decision to cheapen her look with a bleached blond wig and "vulgar clothes". To research her part, Huston studied women dealers at card parlors in Los Angeles County, California. Her performance earned her a nomination for the Academy Award for Best Actress.

Huston obtained the part of Morticia Addams, the stern, aloof matriarch of the titular family, in The Addams Family (1991). She based aspects of her performance on her friend Jerry Hall to give the character more warmth, and in her 2014 memoir Watch Me, Huston described the filming as "long and arduous". It was decided that the character of Morticia should have eyes which slanted upwards at the sides, an effect which was achieved by attaching an elastic strap to the back of Huston's head via fabric tabs glued at her temples, which pulled the corners of her eyes upwards. The bands caused extended discomfort to Huston, and would snap at the slightest turn of her head, causing a grueling repair time. Eventually, Huston learned to pivot and turn on her feet without moving her upper body or head. The Addams Family was a commercial success, grossing over US$191 million worldwide, and prompted a sequel, Addams Family Values (1993). For both installments, Huston garnered Golden Globe Award nominations for Best Actress – Motion Picture Comedy or Musical.

Following a small role in the satire The Player (1992), Huston reunited with Woody Allen on Manhattan Murder Mystery, in which she played the friend of a married couple investigating the death of their neighbor's wife, and also portrayed a mother struggling to parent her autistic child, in the ABC miniseries Family Pictures. Huston received a BAFTA nomination for Best Supporting Actress for Manhattan Murder Mystery, and a nomination for Best Actress – Miniseries or Television Film at the 51st Golden Globe Awards for Family Pictures. In 1995, Huston portrayed a Cuban refuge attempting to stay in America in the comedy The Perez Family and the former wife of a tormented man (played by Jack Nicholson) in Sean Penn's sophomore directorial effort, the drama The Crossing Guard. Her performance in the latter was praised, and Huston received nominations for Best Supporting Actress from the Hollywood Foreign Press and the Screen Actors Guild. Based on the 1990 novel of the same name, the CBS miniseries Buffalo Girls —in which she starred as frontierswoman Calamity Jane, opposite Melanie Griffith and Reba McEntire— earned Huston an Emmy Award nomination for Outstanding Lead Actress in a Miniseries or Movie.

=== Directing (1996–2000) ===
After contemplating the idea of following in her father's footsteps, Huston started to put out "discreet feelers" and pursue material in Hollywood she felt attracted to direct. The studios' overall response was "swift and positive, with the usual blinders", according to Huston. "What they offered me had invariably something to do with my father. I didn't want to do a sequel to Prizzi's Honor. Prizzi belongs to him. I wanted to do something that, succeed or fail, would be my own." She found it in the drama Bastard Out of Carolina, based on a novel by Dorothy Allison, about an impoverished girl who endures physical and sexual abuse. It was screened in the Un Certain Regard section at the 1996 Cannes Film Festival, and debuted as a television film on Showtime. Huston was nominated for the Primetime Emmy Award for Outstanding Directing for a Miniseries or a Special.

In Ever After: A Cinderella Story (1998), a modern, post-feminist interpretation of the Cinderella story alongside Drew Barrymore and Melanie Lynskey, Huston appeared as Baroness Rodmilla De Ghent, the new wife of Auguste de Barbarac, a wealthy widower. The film was acclaimed by critics and made a respectable US$98 million globally. Lisa Schwarzbaum from Entertainment Weekly praised her performance as a cruel stepmother: "Huston does a lot of eye narrowing and eyebrow raising while toddling around in an extraordinary selection of extreme headgear, accompanied by her two less-than-self-actualized daughters—the snooty, social-climbing, nasty Marguerite, and the dim, lumpy, secretly nice Jacqueline. "Nothing is final until you're dead", Mama instructs her girls at the dinner table, "and even then I'm sure God negotiates."

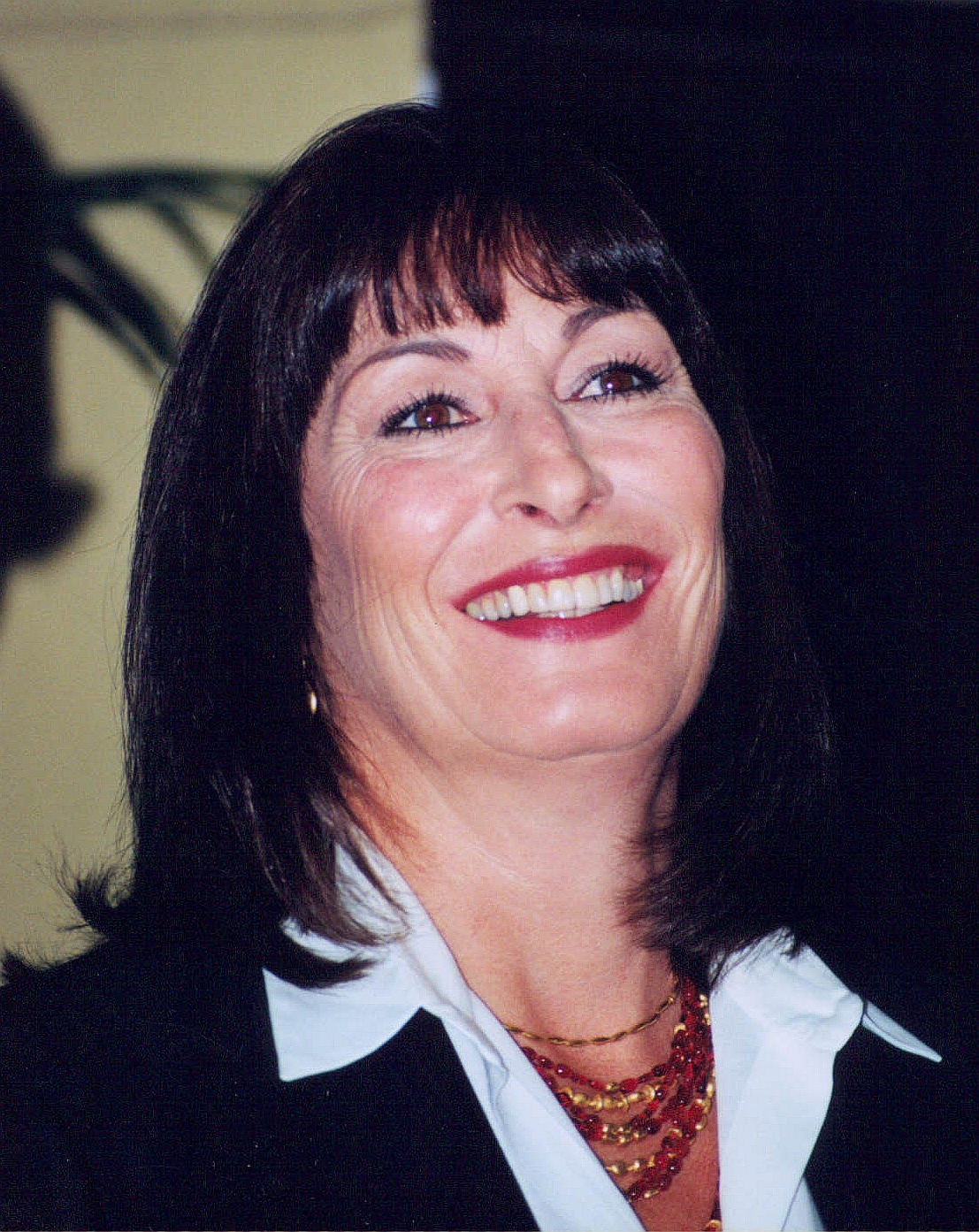
Huston in 2000

In 1998, Huston played a woman romantically involved with a compulsive gambler in the neo-noir Phoenix, with Ray Liotta, as well as the mother of a troubled man in Vincent Gallo's independent dramedy Buffalo '66, which starred Gallo as her son and reunited her with Christina Ricci. The director had difficulties working with his cast and crew, and reportedly did not get along with Huston on set. He claimed that she caused the film to be turned down by the Cannes Film Festival.

Her next directorial effort, the Irish dramedy Agnes Browne (1999)—in which Huston also starred as the title character—released to mixed reviews. The New York Times reviewer Stephen Holden found it "nothing more than a series of homey skits loosely woven into a portrait of a working-class saint." Nevertheless, the film won the Youth Jury Award at the 1999 San Sebastián International Film Festival and received a Grand Prix nomination at the Ghent International Film Festival that same year. Huston appeared as an affluent English woman, alongside James Fox, Nick Nolte, Kate Beckinsale, and Uma Thurman, in James Ivory's period drama The Golden Bowl (2000), based on the 1904 novel of the same name by Henry James.

=== Films with Wes Anderson (2001–2007) ===
In The Royal Tenenbaums (2001), her first collaboration with director Wes Anderson, Huston took on the role of the soft-spoken matriarch of an estranged family of former child prodigies, alongside Gene Hackman, Gwyneth Paltrow, Ben Stiller, and Luke Wilson. During production, Anderson gave Huston photographs of his mother who, like Etheline, was an archaeologist. Huston said, "Wes would send pictures of his mother in aviator jackets or on archaeological digs, and he very specifically wanted me to wear a certain locket. Finally, I asked him, 'Wes, am I playing your mother?'" Anderson replied this was not the case. Anderson and Huston had a tense relationship with Hackman, who was not always amiable on set. On the first day, Hackman and Huston appeared in a scene together, Huston had to slap him, and later said the slap was real and "I hit him a really good one. I saw the imprint of my hand on his cheek and I thought, he's going to kill me." During young Margot's birthday scene in the opening scenes, Huston's hair caught fire from a birthday candle. Anderson credited Kumar Pallana with extinguishing the blaze before Huston was seriously injured. A positive critical response greeted The Royal Tenenbaums, which made US$71.4 million worldwide.

In 2001, Huston starred as Viviane, Lady of the Lake, in the TNT miniseries The Mists of Avalon, based on the 1983 novel of the same title by Marion Zimmer Bradley. The production was watched by more than 30 million "unduplicated viewers" during its premiere, making it the highest-rated original movie of the summer on basic cable, and earned Huston nominations for a Primetime Emmy Award and a Screen Actors Guild Award. In 2002, she portrayed the doctor of an ex-FBI agent (Clint Eastwood) chasing a sadistic killer (Jeff Daniels) in the thriller Blood Work, loosely based on the 1998 novel of the same name by Michael Connelly, as well as the longtime client of a man who runs an exclusive escort service in George Hickenlooper's black comedy The Man from Elysian Fields, with Andy Garcia and Mick Jagger. Despite both films' lukewarm critical and commercial responses, Todd McCarthy of Variety felt that her character in Elysian Fields was "played with invigorating relish" by the actress, while Roger Ebert hailed the film as "one of the best films" of the year.

Daddy Day Care (2003), co-starring Eddie Murphy, featured Huston as the ruthless headmistress of an expensive and over-academic preschool. Slant, in a critical review of the film, noted that Huston "brings embarrassing conviction to the role of stuffy day care proprietress ... Daddy Day Care seems to exist solely to sedate a theater-going public's offspring. And while the film's sense of sobriety should do the job, don't expect The Witches". Nevertheless, the release was a commercial success, grossing over US$160 million worldwide.

In 2004, Huston took on the role of women's suffrage leader Carrie Chapman Catt in the HBO film Iron Jawed Angels, with Hilary Swank, Frances O'Connor and Julia Ormond. For her role, Huston received a Primetime Emmy Award nomination for Outstanding Supporting Actress in a Limited Series or Movie, and won the Golden Globe and the Satellite Award for Best Supporting Actress – Series, Miniseries or Television Film. In The Life Aquatic with Steve Zissou (2004), her second film with Wes Anderson, Huston portrayed the estranged wife of an eccentric oceanographer. Roger Ebert observed that the actress "seems privately amused, which is so much more intriguing than seeming publicly amused", but noted that he "can't recommend [the film], but I would not for one second discourage you from seeing it". As a member of the cast, she garnered nominations for Best Ensemble from the Boston Society of Film Critics and the Critics' Choice Movie Awards.

Huston filmed her third directorial effort, the Hallmark Channel drama Riding the Bus with My Sister (2005), in Hamilton, Ontario, Canada. It was adapted from the 2002 memoir by Rachel Simon, and starred Rosie O'Donnell and Andie MacDowell. Unlike the book, the film received negative reviews from critics, who generally criticised the film's "egregious" portrayal of Down's Syndrome. However, Huston said: "I think the movie comes from a pretty direct point of view".

In 2006, Huston was featured as an art teacher in the dramedy Art School Confidential, the president of the United States in the made-for-CBS thriller Covert One: The Hades Factor, a competing business owner in the comedy Material Girls, a vanishing con artist in the revisionist Western Seraphim Falls, and an ebullient patroness in the romantic drama These Foolish Things. Excluding Seraphim Falls, none of the aforementioned films performed well with critics nor audiences. This changed with her third Wes Anderson film, The Darjeeling Limited (2007), in which Huston starred as the mother of three brothers who becomes a nun and moves to a Christian convent in the Himalayas. Peter Travers, for Rolling Stone found her to be a "dynamite" in the film, which he deemed "the fullest blossoming yet of Anderson's talents as a total filmmaker".

=== Voice-over and television roles (2008–2016) ===
Choke (2008), a black comedy directed by Clark Gregg and based on the 2001 novel of the same name by Chuck Palahniuk, featured Huston as the hospitalized mother of a sex addict in Colonial America. Reviews for the film were mixed, but Empire critic Philip Wilding wrote: "Huston is magnetic as [the] ailing mother Ida, both as a fading invalid or vibrant and deranged in flashback. She is the hook on which her son hangs his hopes and anxieties". Meanwhile, Roger Ebert felt that her role "resembled the criminal character" she played in The Grifters (1990). In 2008, Huston also voiced Queen Clarion in Tinker Bell, which was released on DVD to outstanding commercial results. She reprised the role in four sequels, a television special and a short film, all released between 2009 and 2015.

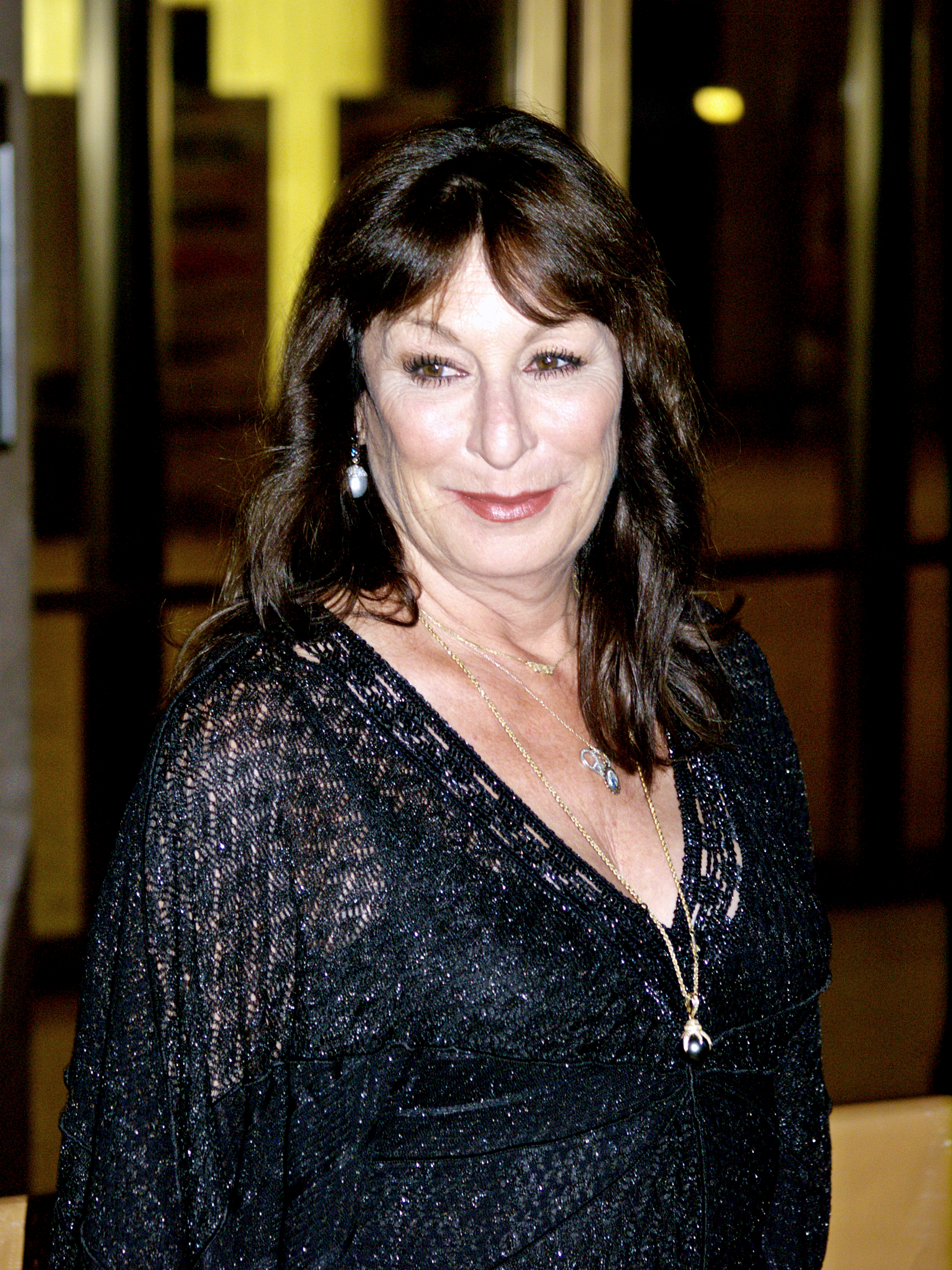
Huston at the 2010 Metropolitan Opera opening of Das Rheingold

Huston took on significant roles in three 2011 live-action films. The first was that of Miss Battle-Axe, a strict, sadistic schoolteacher who talks with a Scottish accent, in the 3D children's musical adventure comedy Horrid Henry: The Movie, directed by Nick Moore. She found her character to be "irresistible", explaining to The Guardian: "It's very British material to me, and I've always been strangely attracted to these extreme characters". The film was panned by critics but was a commercial success in the UK. Huston's second performance of 2011 was that of a mother of a man with a malignant cancerous tumor in the drama 50/50, directed by Jonathan Levine and co-starring Joseph Gordon-Levitt and Seth Rogen. The film was a critical and commercial darling upon its release. David Schmader, writing in the Stranger, praised the "stellar" cast and felt that Huston "roars back to prominence with a twisty performance as Adam's barely contained mess of a mom". The unsuccessful The Big Year, Huston's last live-action film of 2011, featured her as an "avid birder", who "captains ocean-going expeditions".

Huston starred in the NBC television series Smash (2012–13), as Broadway producer Eileen Rand. After her husband's death in 2008, Huston credited Smash—her first regular venture into series television—with coming at a "vital time" and finally filling a void in her life. The series aired for two seasons and was the subject of critical acclaim. Huston subsequently appeared in the second and third seasons of the Amazon Video series Transparent, as Vic, a cisgender woman who forms a connection with Maura, a retired college professor of political science at UCLA. In the horror comedy The Cleanse (2016), Huston played the director of a secretive self-help program, alongside Johnny Galecki, Anna Friel and Oliver Platt.

=== Recent works (2017–present) ===
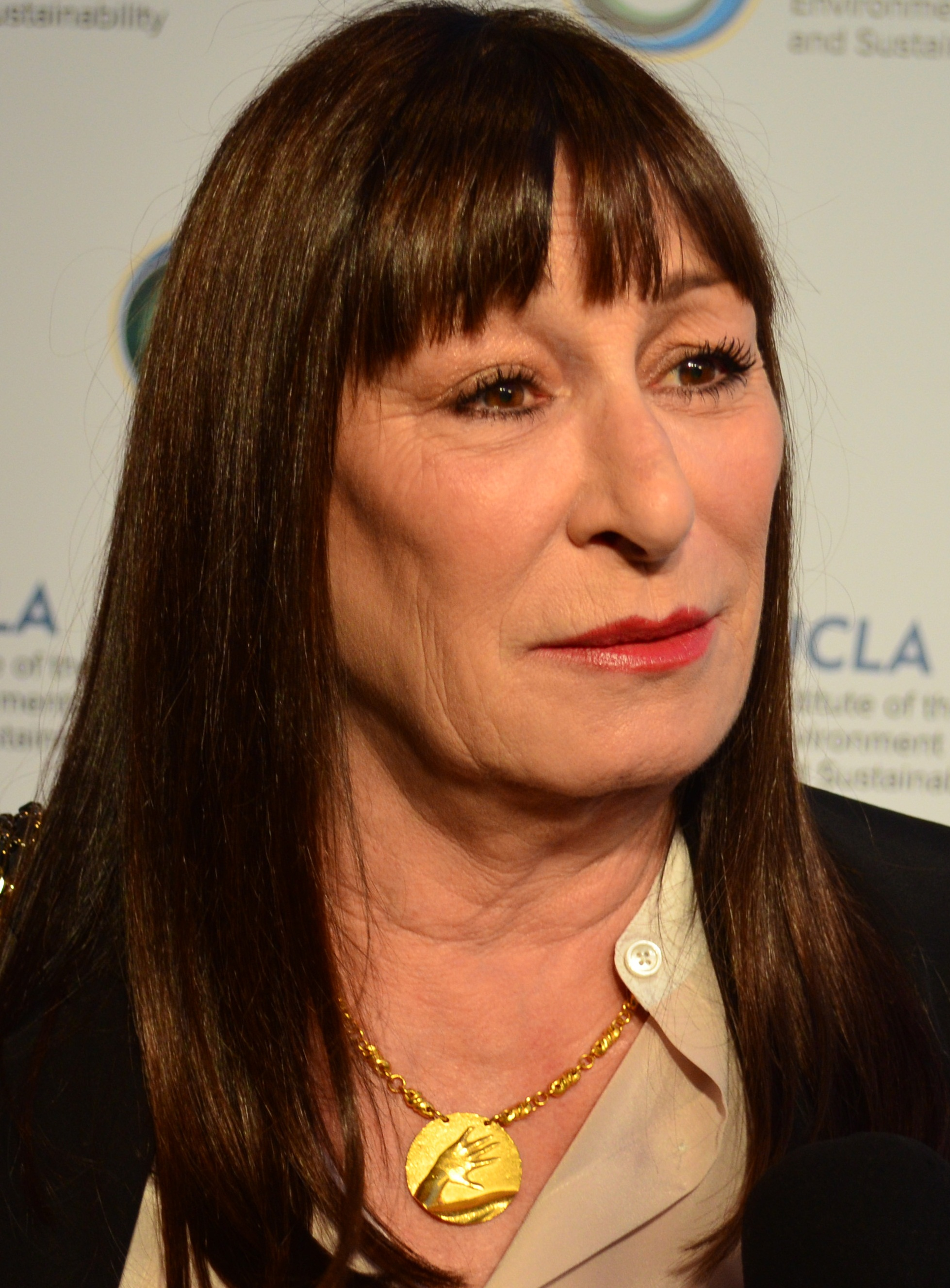
Huston in 2014

In 2017, Huston narrated the black comedy Thirst Street, and starred with Bill Pullman as siblings feuding over possession of their father's estate in the comedy Trouble. John DeFore of The Hollywood Reporter praised the latter film, on which Huston was an executive producer, writing that "the cast goes a long way here, turning Trouble at times into the kind of small-town hangout film that will please fest auds." Huston played the Director, a heavily bejeweled Russian ballet instructor, and what Vulture described as a "small but memorable role", in John Wick: Chapter 3 – Parabellum (2019), which made US$326 million worldwide and received positive reviews from critics. She reprised her role as the Director in Ballerina.

On June 5, 2024, it was announced that Huston had been cast as the lead in the BBC Agatha Christie limited series, Towards Zero. A few months later, on September 6, it was announced that Huston was cast in the lead of the live-action/hybrid feature The Christmas Witch Trial of La Befana. Huston is set to star alongside her brother, Danny, in this film inspired by Italian folklore.

== Personal life ==
Huston was a close friend of actor Gregory Peck, whom her father directed in Moby Dick (1956). The two first met on the set of the film when Huston was four years old while Peck was in costume as Captain Ahab. Decades later, after her father's death, Huston reunited with Peck and maintained a friendship that lasted until his death.

Huston was an inadvertent witness in the Roman Polanski sexual abuse case in March 1977, when she encountered Polanski and his 13-year-old victim by chance in the home of her boyfriend, Jack Nicholson. When authorities searched the house in connection to the accusations against Polanski, Huston was arrested for cocaine possession, but she was never charged because the search and seizure of her handbag had been illegal. Although she had witnessed no abuse, Huston was subsequently embroiled in the publicity surrounding Polanski's trial as a rumored witness for the prosecution, though she was not ultimately called.

=== Relationships ===
In 1969, at age 17, Huston began dating photographer Bob Richardson, then 41; they lived together from that year until March 1973. A month later, she met Jack Nicholson at his 36th birthday party, and the pair started an on-again, off-again relationship that lasted until 1990, when the media reported he had fathered a child with Rebecca Broussard. During a break from Nicholson in the late 1970s, Huston was involved with Ryan O'Neal, who allegedly assaulted her.

On May 23, 1992, Huston married sculptor Robert Graham, following a courtship of almost two years. They lived in a three-story house, designed by Graham in Venice, California, until his death on December 27, 2008. She does not have any children, but stated in a Lifetime Intimate Portrait that she had tried to have a baby on several occasions.

In her memoirs, Huston confirmed romances with James Fox, David Bailey and Prince Albert of Monaco. She also acknowledged an affair during the shooting of Ever After: A Cinderella Story (1998), with a married man known simply as Dolyn in the book.

During a 2013 interview with Larry King, Huston said that she did not have a lover and was not looking for one.

=== Health ===
In April 2025, Huston revealed that she was diagnosed with cancer in 2019 and was now four years cancer-free.

=== Activism ===
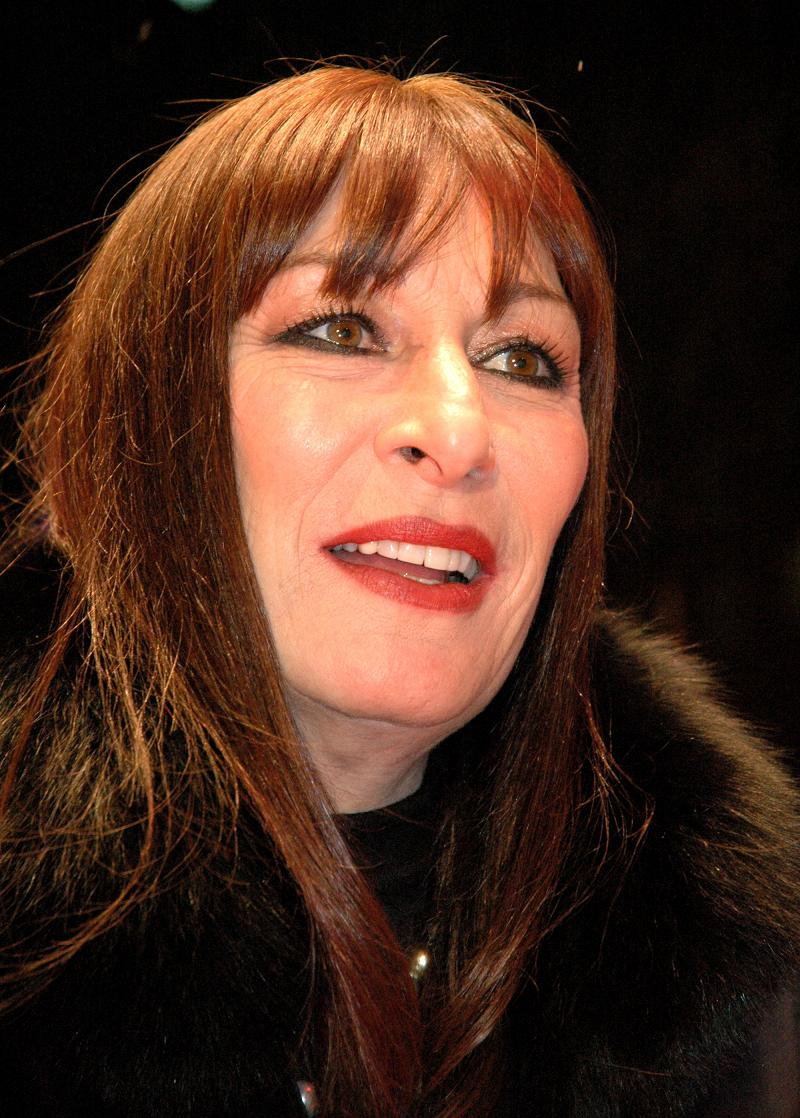
Huston in 2005

Huston led a letter campaign organized by the U.S. Campaign for Burma and Human Rights Action Center in November 2007. The letter, signed by over 25 high-profile individuals from the entertainment business, was addressed to the United Nations Secretary General Ban Ki-moon and urged him to "personally intervene" to secure the release of Nobel Peace Prize recipient Aung San Suu Kyi of Burma. Huston currently sits on the advisory council of Save the Chimps, the largest chimpanzee sanctuary and rescue in history. She has narrated the educational video Save the Chimps History exposing the cruelty of chimpanzee abuse by laboratories, entertainment and NASA's primates in space program, which sent primates into space often resulting in death by impact and explosion.

In 1995, Huston donated $500 to the Irish republican political party Sinn Féin. She has also attended Sinn Féin events and supported Martin McGuinness in his bid for the Presidency of Ireland in 2011.

In December 2012, Huston recorded a public service announcement for PETA urging her colleagues in Hollywood to refrain from using great apes in television, films, and advertisements. The animal rights organization subsequently named her their Person of the Year 2012. In 2018, Huston donated her fur coats to the homeless and animal shelters. She was the executive producer for Breaking the Chain, a 2020 documentary about the PETA fieldworkers who try to help neglected animals.

In August 2024, Huston wrote an open letter to Evelyn Welch, vice chancellor of the University of Bristol, calling on Welch to end "forced swim tests" on rats and mice in labs at the university's research departments.

== Bibliography ==
=== Books ===
- Huston, Anjelica (2013). A Story Lately Told: Coming of Age in Ireland, London, and New York. New York: Scribner. Also published in London by Simon & Schuster.
  - — (2014). A Story Lately Told: Coming of Age in Ireland, London, and New York. Paperback reprint. New York: Scribner.
- — (2014). Watch Me: A Memoir. New York: Scribner. ISBN 9781476760346.

=== Critical studies, reviews and biography ===
- Jones, Lewis (January 4, 2014). "Blazing Saddles". Books. The Spectator. Vol. 324, no. 9671. pp. 24–25. Review of A Story Lately Told.
