= 51st Golden Globe Awards =

Film award ceremony in 1994

- Date: January 22, 1994
- Site: Beverly Hilton Hotel, Beverly Hills, California
- Hosted by: Tim Curry; Faye Dunaway

Highlights
- Best Film: Drama: Schindler's List
- Best Film: Musical or Comedy: Mrs. Doubtfire
- Best Drama Series: NYPD Blue
- Best Musical or Comedy Series: Seinfeld
- Most awards: (3) Schindler's List
- Most nominations: (6) The Piano; Schindler's List

Television coverage
- Network: TBS

The 51st Golden Globe Awards, honoring the best in film and television for 1993, were held on January 22, 1994, at the Beverly Hilton Hotel in Beverly Hills, California. The nominations were announced on December 22, 1993.

== Winners and nominees ==
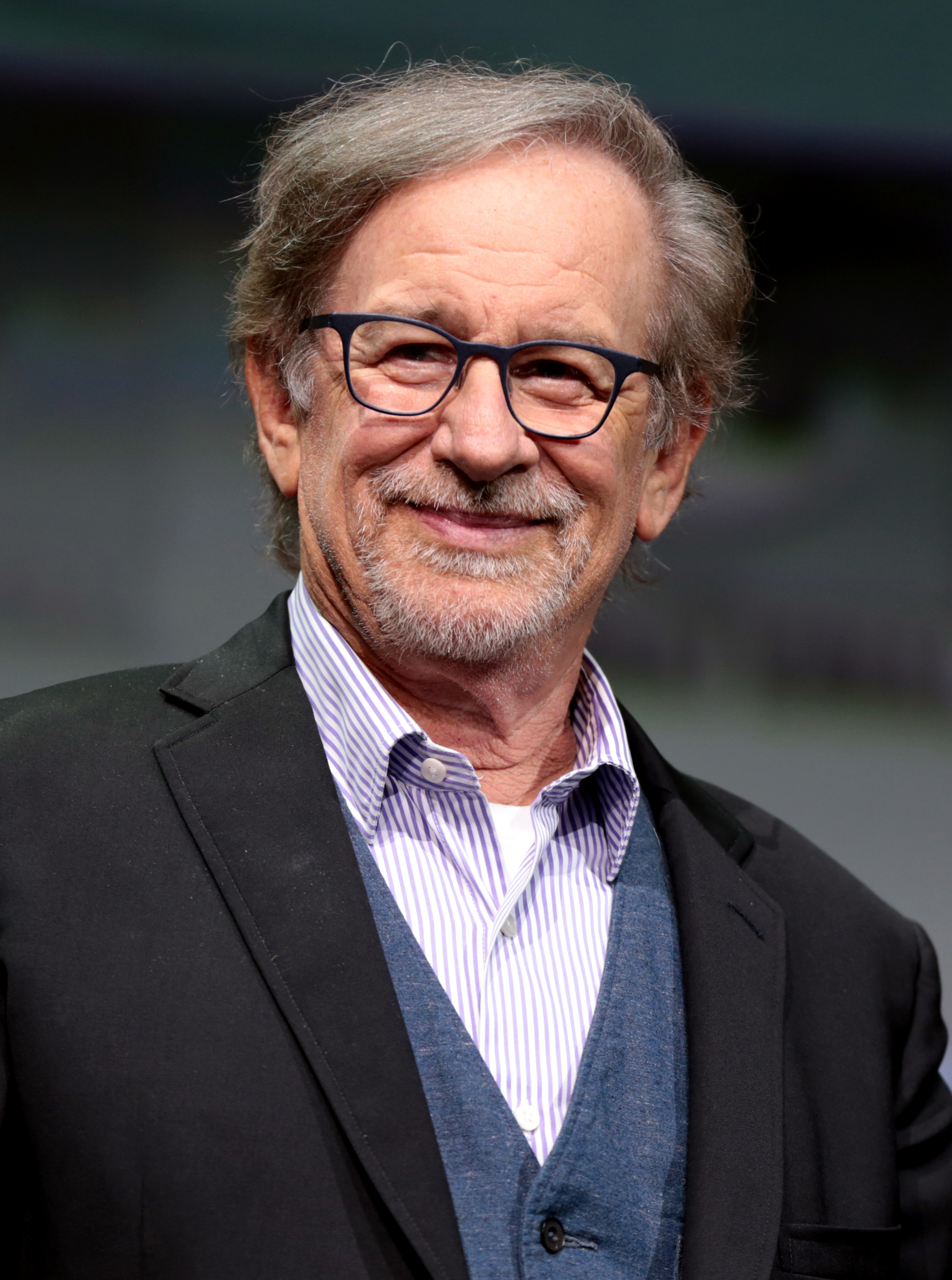
Steven Spielberg — Best Director, winner

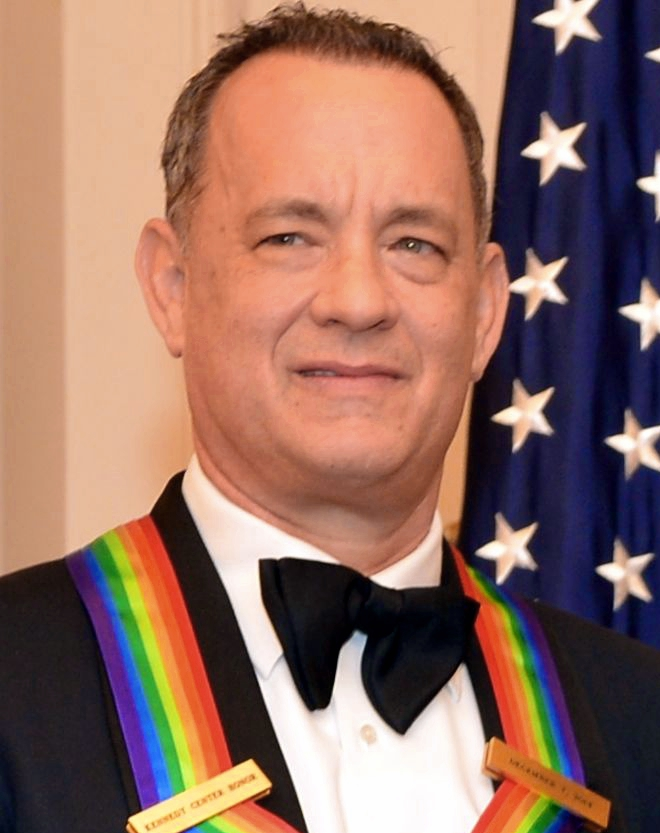
Tom Hanks — Best Actor in a Motion Picture, Drama winner

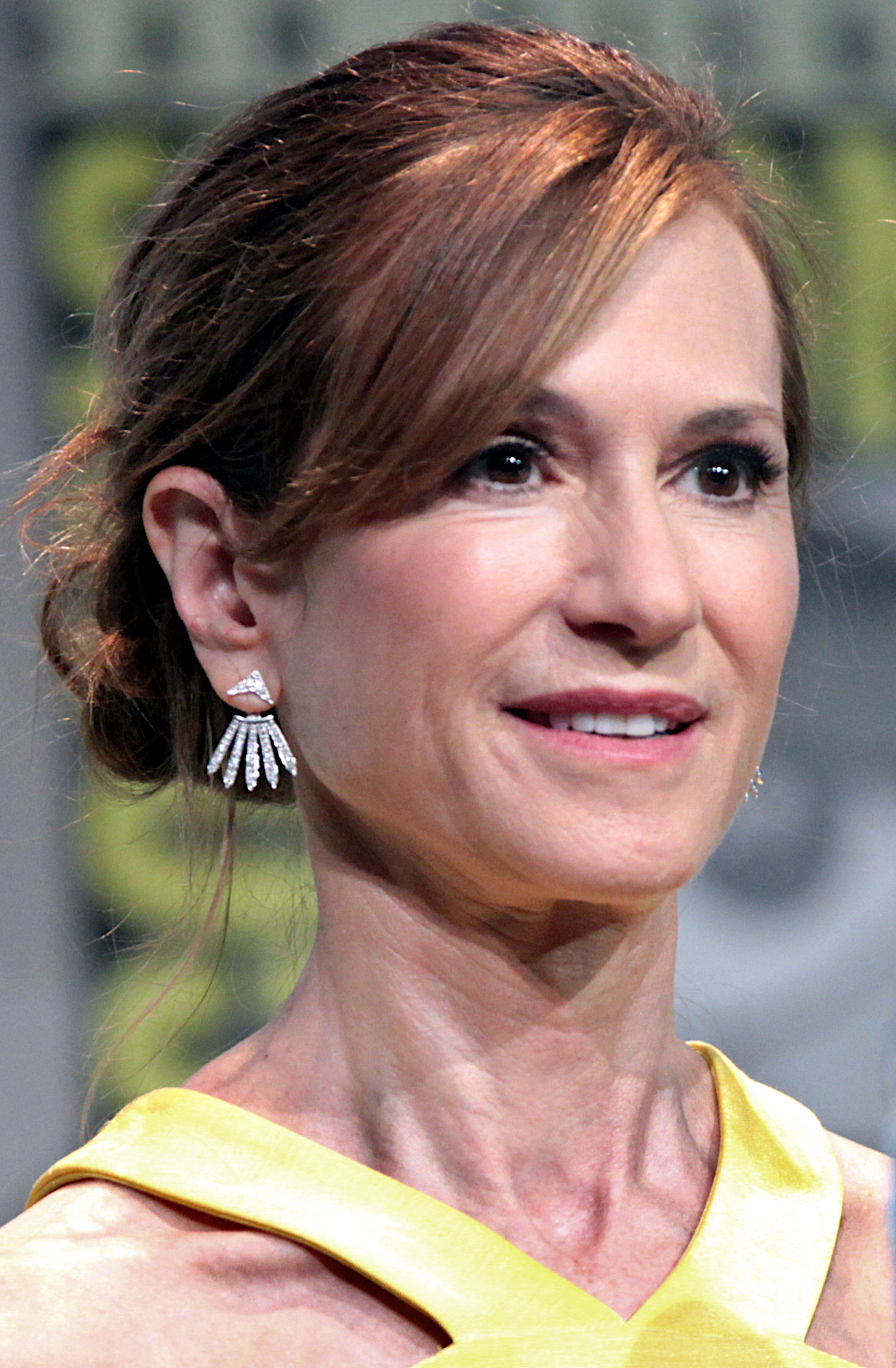
Holly Hunter — Best Actress in a Motion Picture, Drama winner

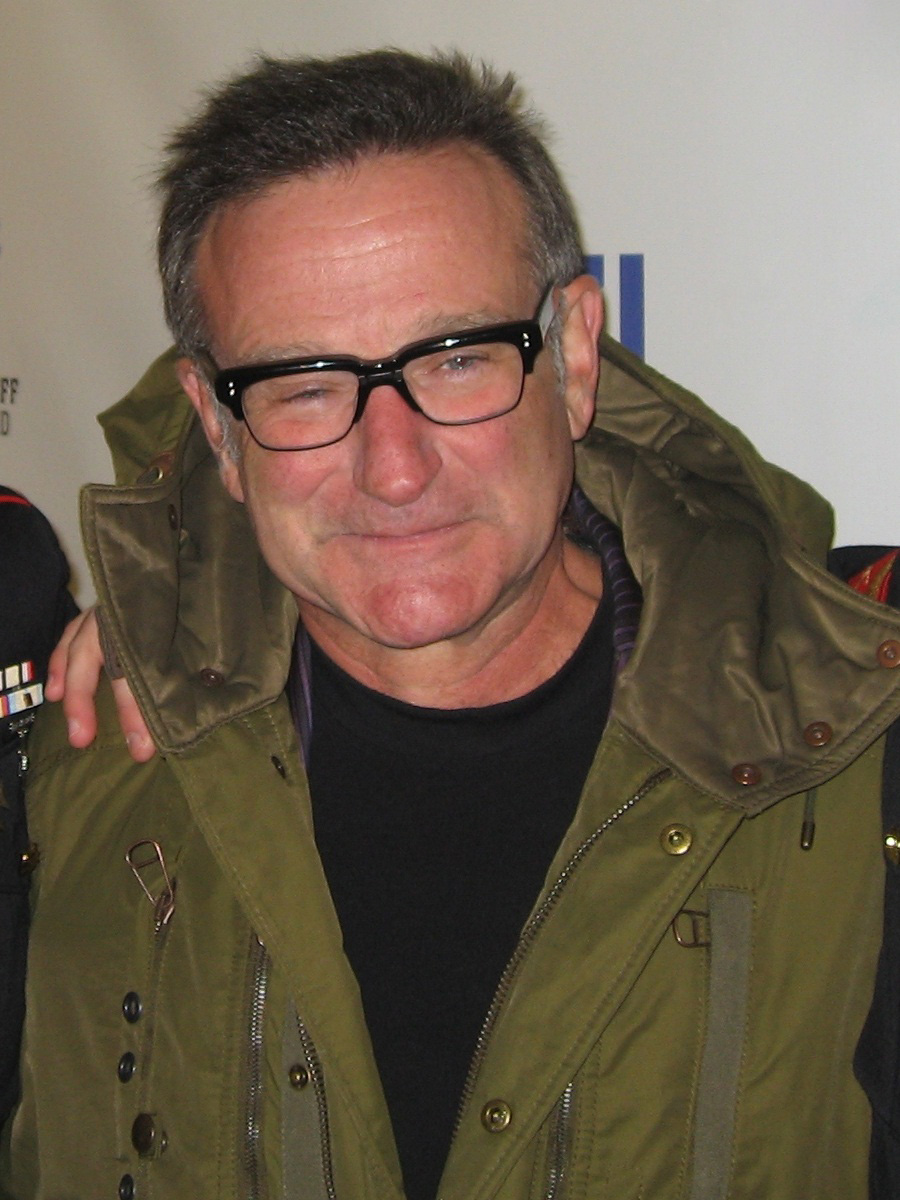
Robin Williams — Best Actor in a Motion Picture, Musical or Comedy winner

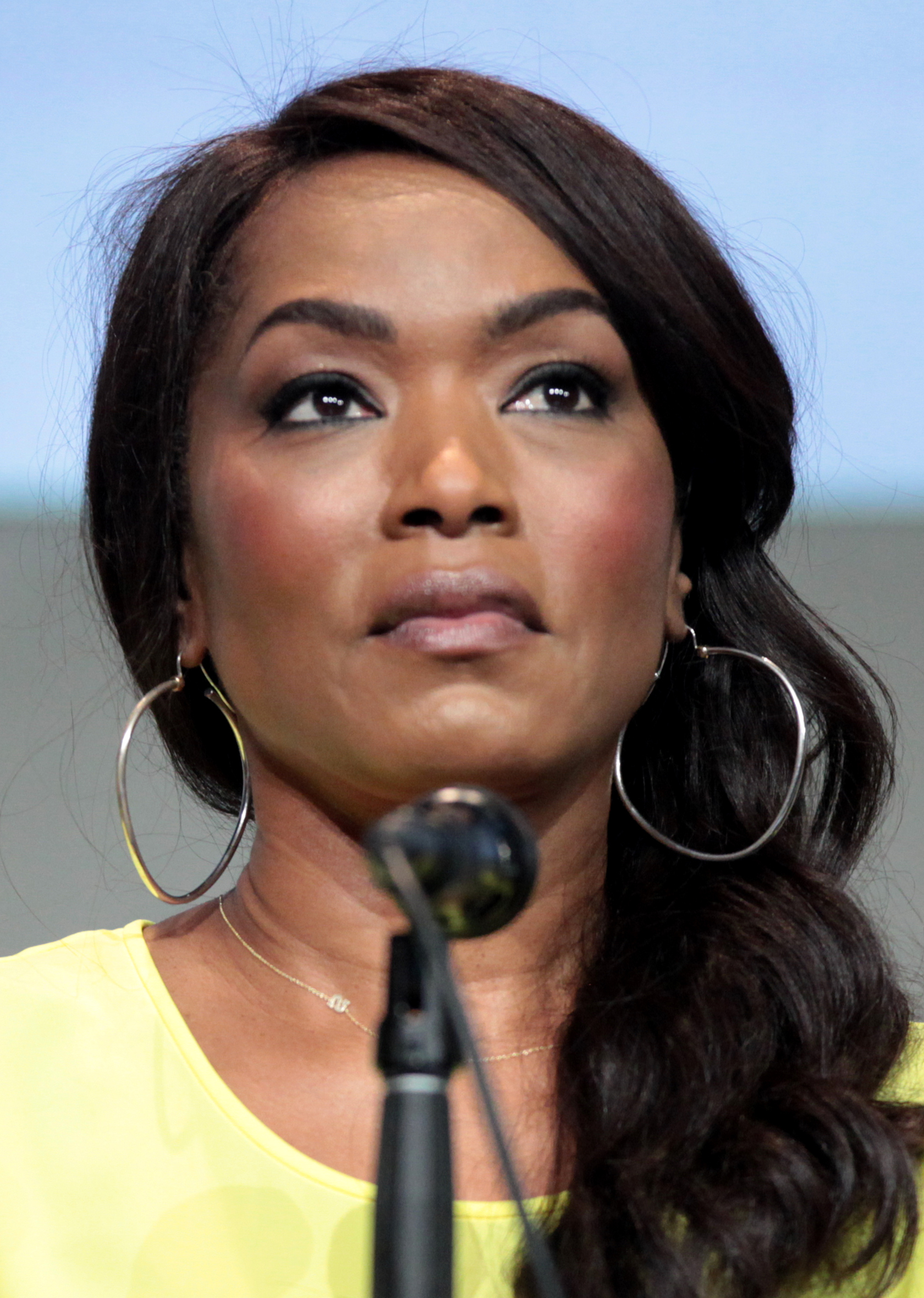
Angela Bassett — Best Actress in a Motion Picture, Comedy or Musical winner

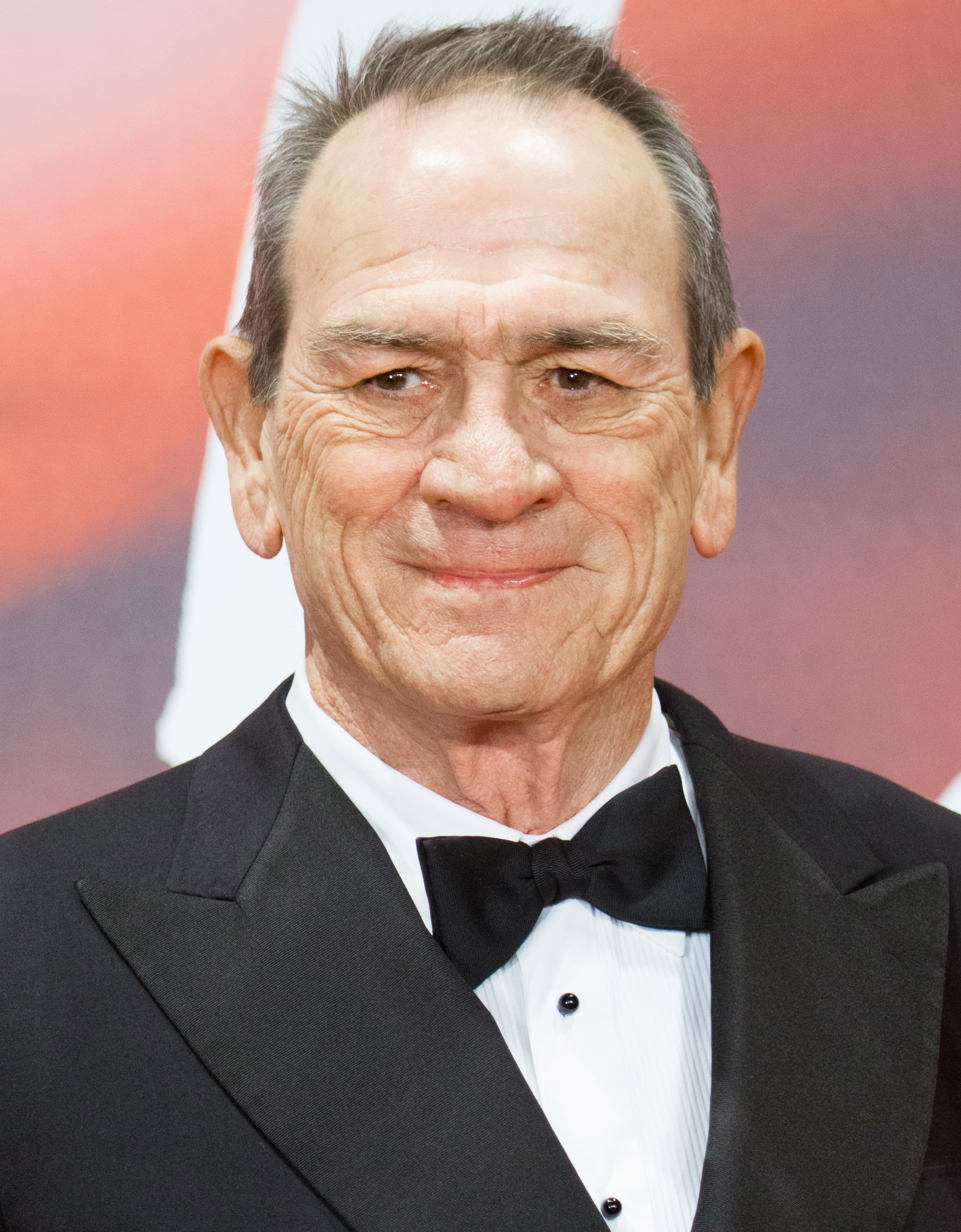
Tommy Lee Jones — Best Supporting Actor in a Motion Picture Drama, Musical or Comedy winner

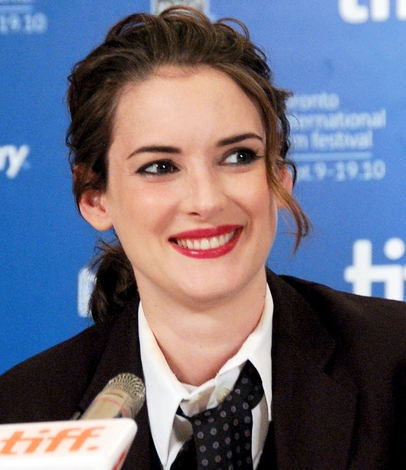
Winona Ryder — Best Supporting Actress in a Motion Picture Drama, Musical or Comedy winner

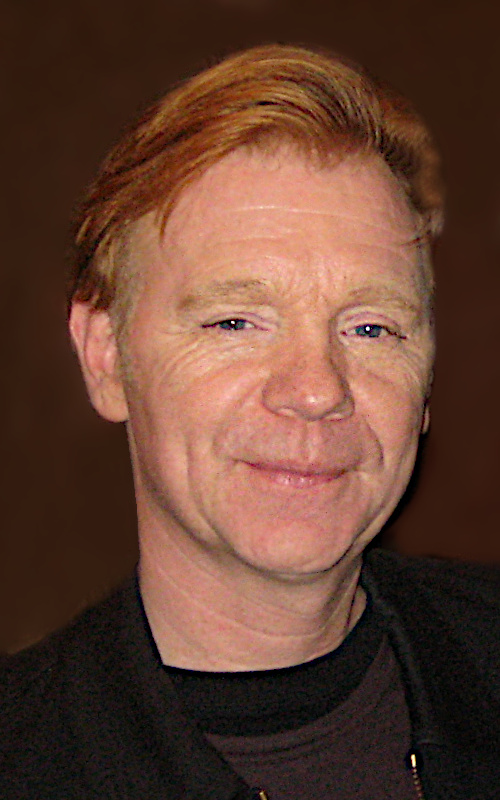
David Caruso — Best Actor in a Television Series, Drama winner

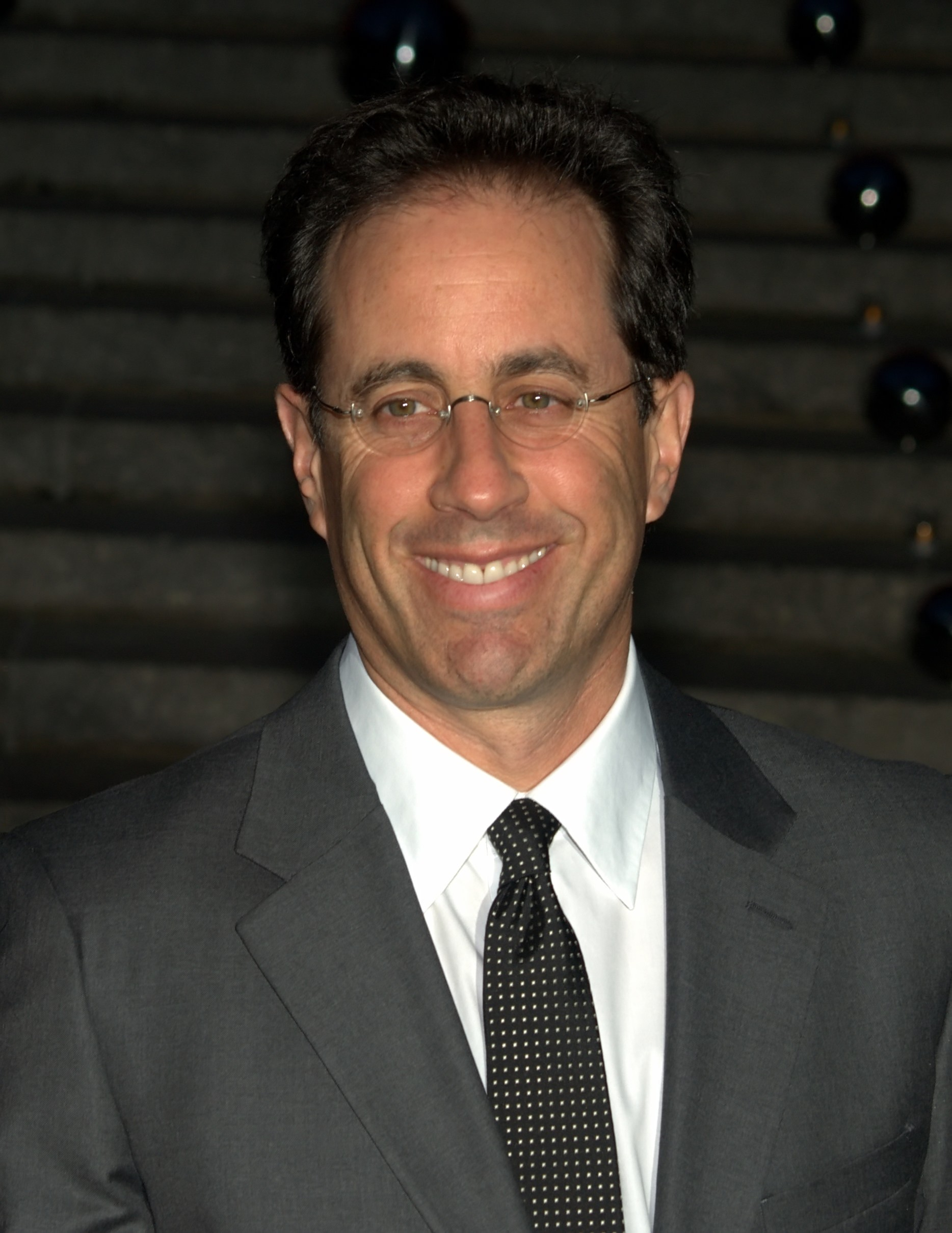
Jerry Seinfeld — Best Actor in a Television Series, Musical or Comedy winner

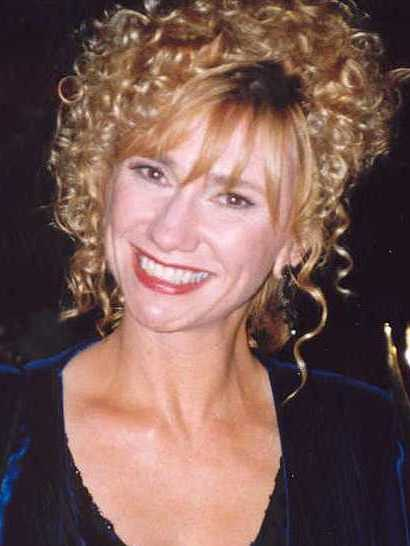
Kathy Baker — Best Actress in a Television Series, Drama winner

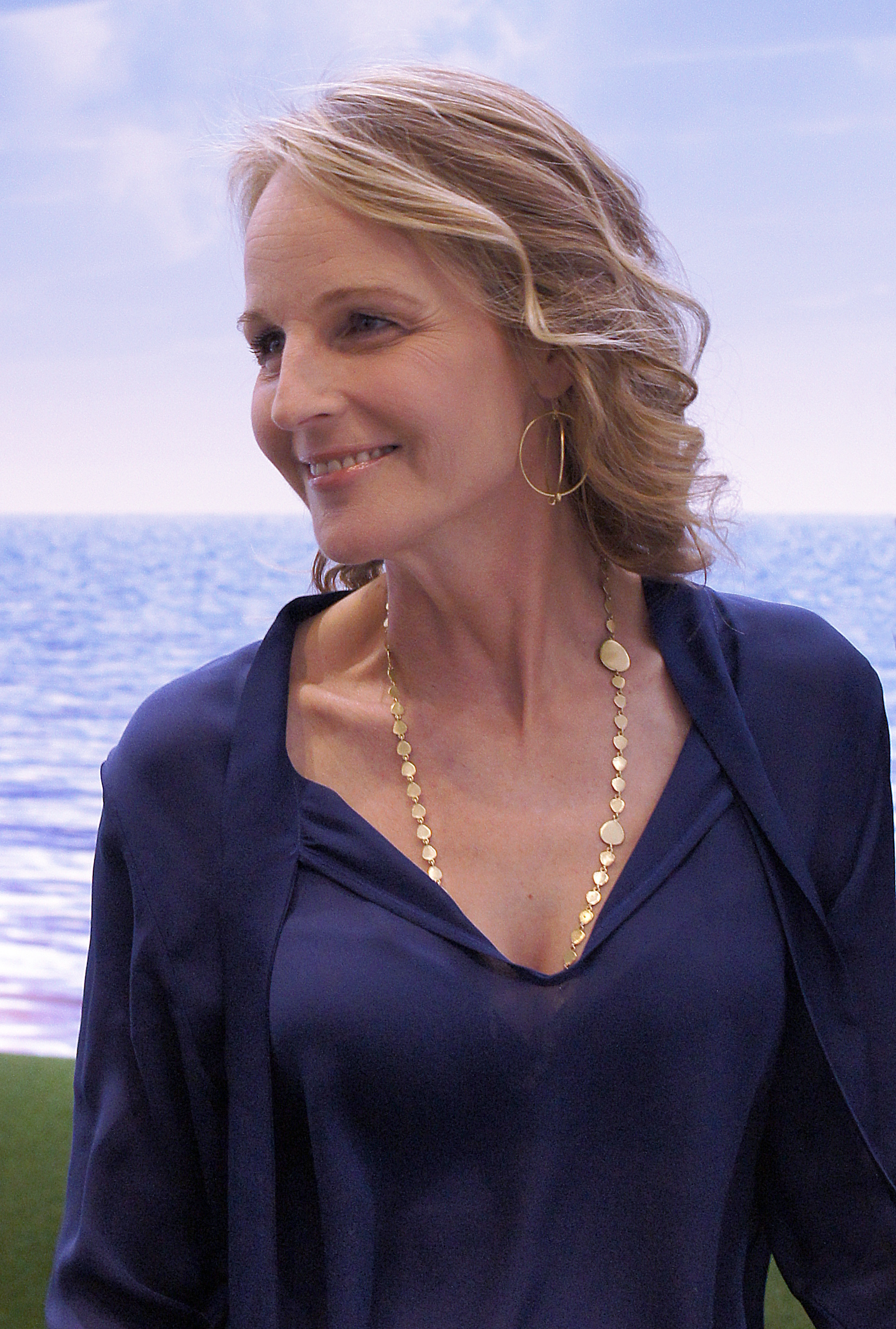
Helen Hunt — Best Actress in a Television Series, Musical or Comedy winner

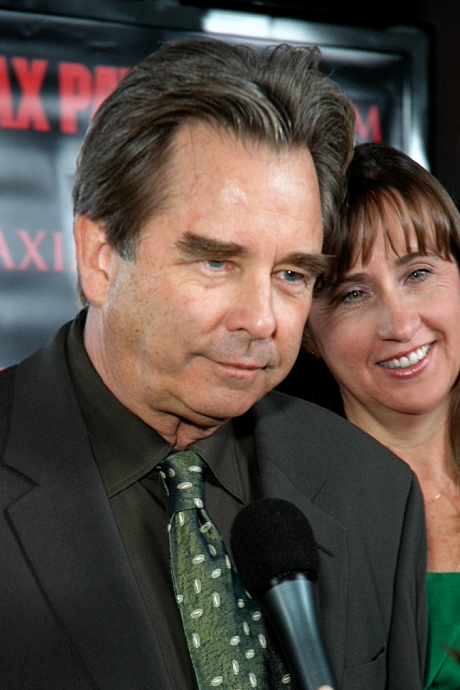
Beau Bridges — Best Supporting Actor in a Series, Miniseries or Motion Picture Made for Television winner

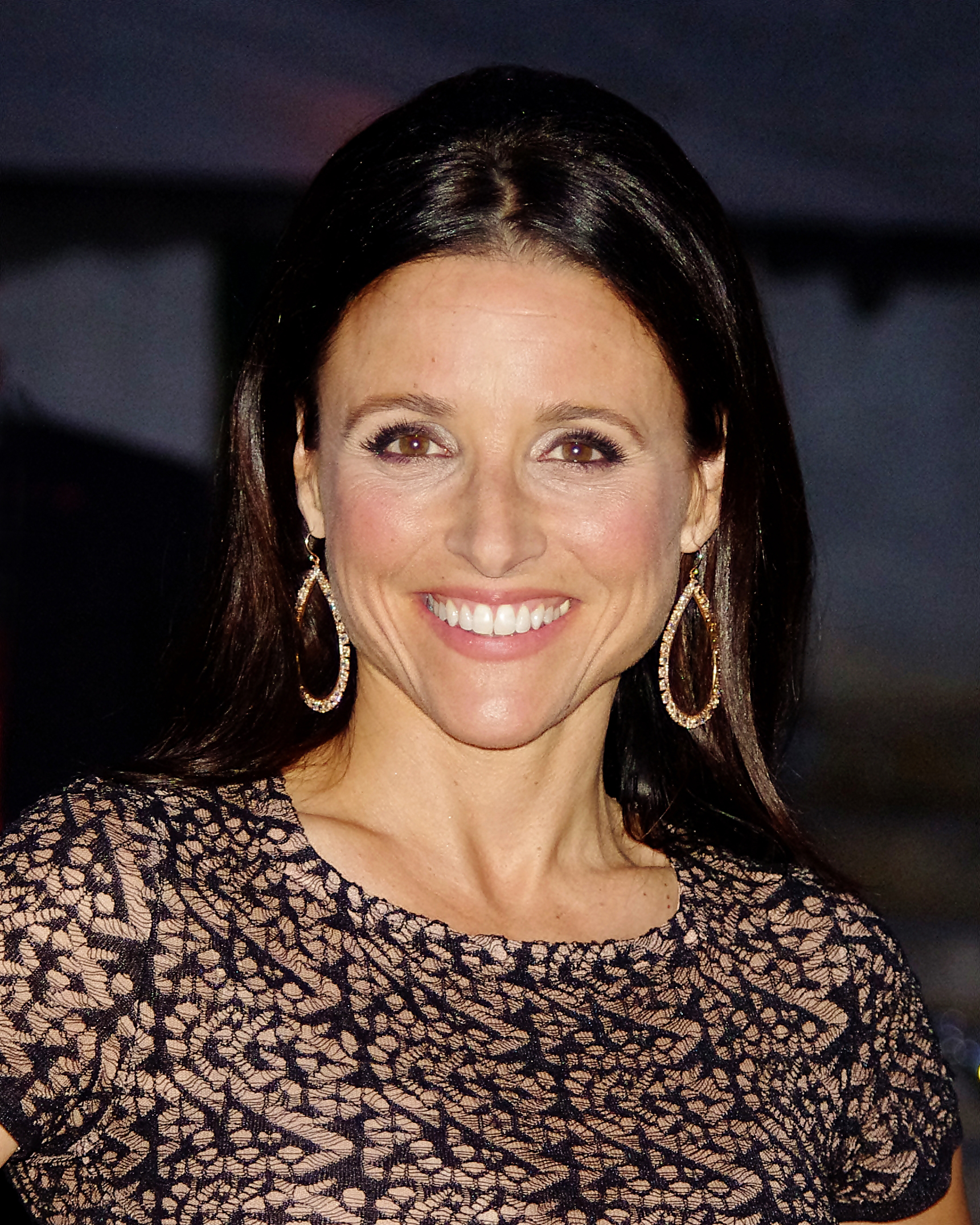
Julia Louis-Dreyfus — Best Supporting Actress in a Series, Miniseries or Motion Picture Made for Television winner

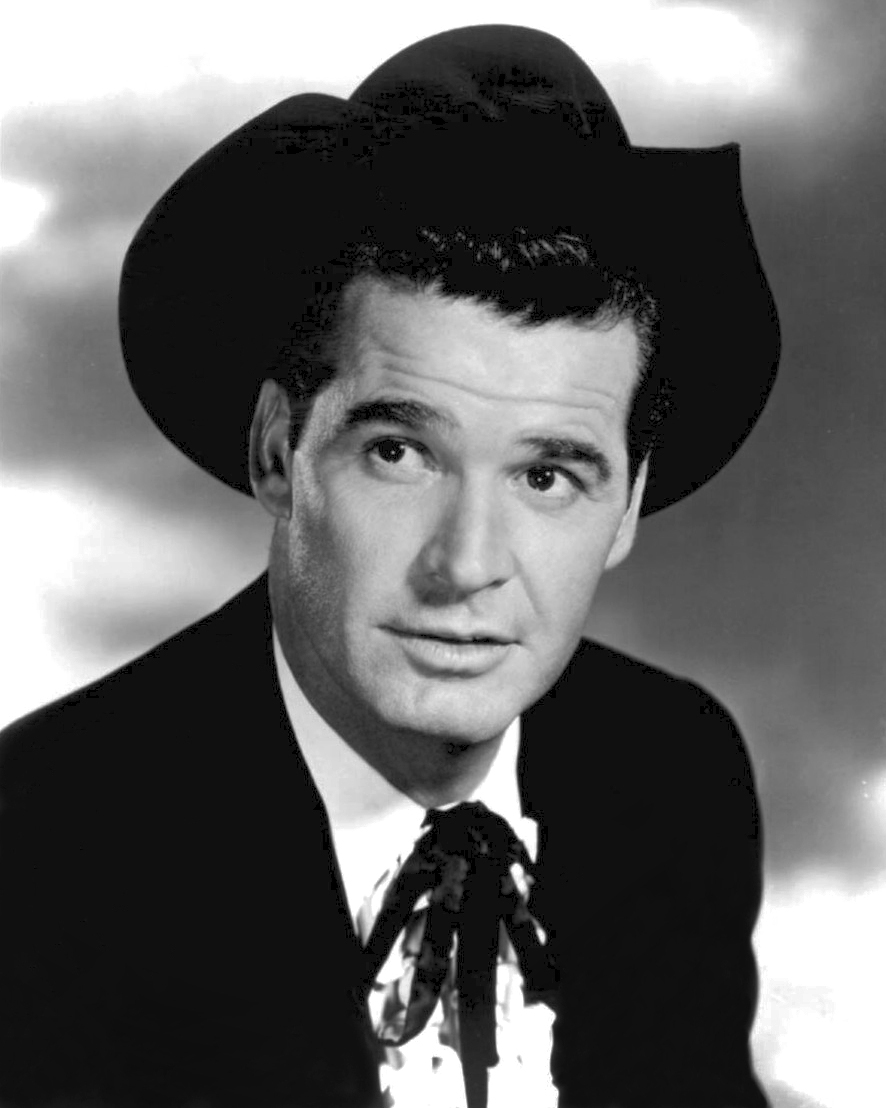
James Garner — Best Actor in a Miniseries or Television Film winner

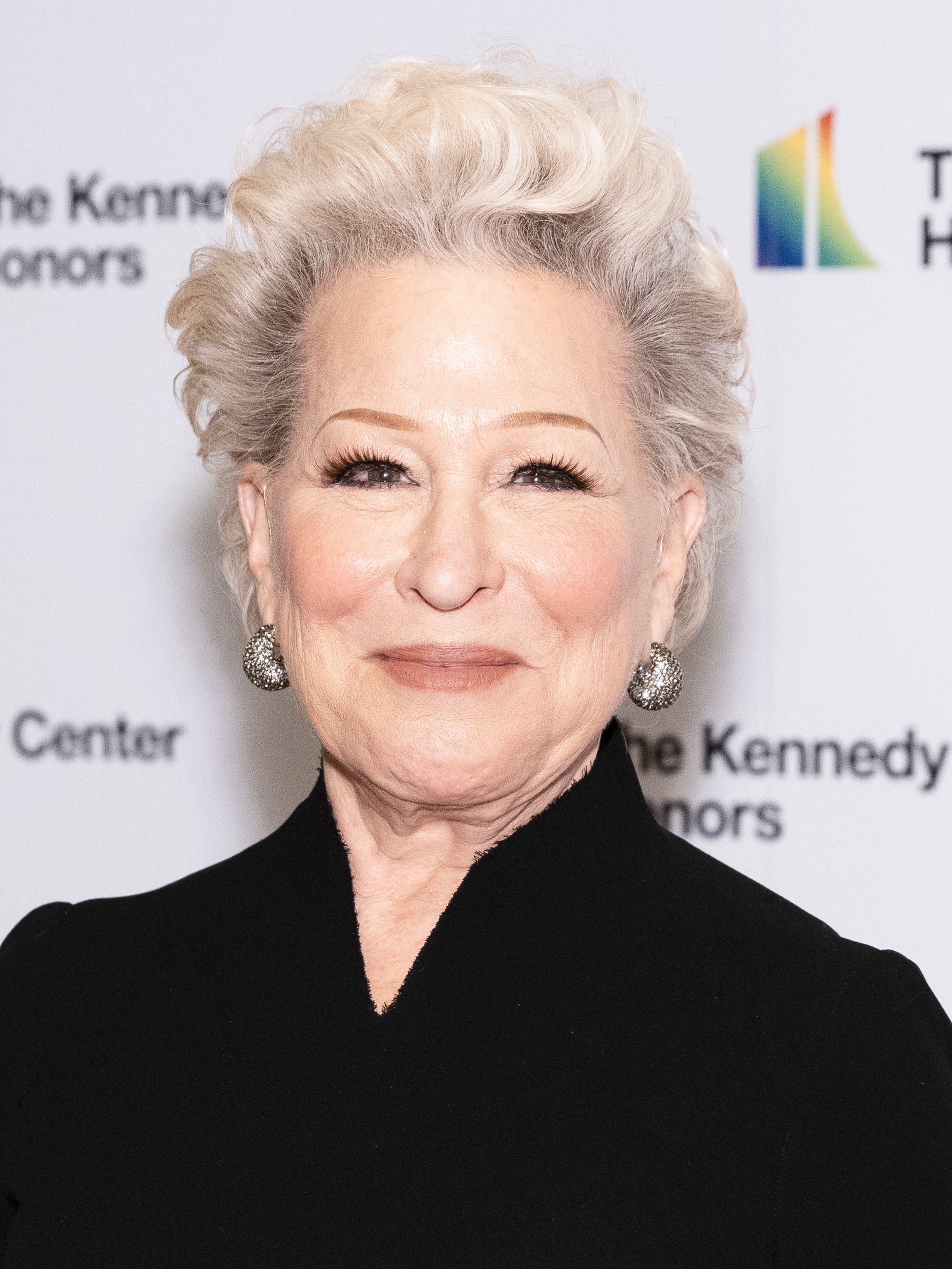
Bette Midler — Best Actress in a Miniseries or Television Film winner

=== Film ===
Best Motion Picture
Drama	Musical or Comedy
Schindler's List: The Age of Innocence; In the Name of the Father; The Piano; The Remains of the Day	Mrs. Doubtfire: Dave; Much Ado About Nothing; Sleepless in Seattle; Strictly Ballroom
Best Performance in a Motion Picture – Drama
Actor	Actress
Tom Hanks – Philadelphia as Andrew Beckett: Daniel Day-Lewis – In the Name of the Father as Gerard "Gerry" Conlon; Harrison Ford – The Fugitive as Dr. Richard Kimble; Anthony Hopkins – The Remains of the Day as James Stevens; Liam Neeson – Schindler's List as Oskar Schindler	Holly Hunter – The Piano as Ada McGrath: Juliette Binoche – Three Colors: Blue (Trois Couleurs: Bleu) as Julie de Courcy; Michelle Pfeiffer – The Age of Innocence as Countess Ellen Olenska; Emma Thompson – The Remains of the Day as Sarah "Sally" Kenton; Debra Winger – A Dangerous Woman as Martha Horgan
Best Performance in a Motion Picture – Musical or Comedy
Actor	Actress
Robin Williams – Mrs. Doubtfire as Daniel Hillard / Euphegenia Doubtfire: Johnny Depp – Benny & Joon as Sam; Tom Hanks – Sleepless in Seattle as Sam Baldwin; Kevin Kline – Dave as Dave Kovic / President William Harrison Mitchell; Colm Meaney – The Snapper as Des Curley	Angela Bassett – What's Love Got to Do with It as Tina Turner: Stockard Channing – Six Degrees of Separation as Louisa "Ouisa" Kittredge; Anjelica Huston – Addams Family Values as Morticia Addams; Diane Keaton – Manhattan Murder Mystery as Carol Lipton; Meg Ryan – Sleepless in Seattle as Annie Reed
Best Supporting Performance in a Motion Picture – Drama, Musical or Comedy
Supporting Actor	Supporting Actress
Tommy Lee Jones – The Fugitive as Samuel Gerard: Leonardo DiCaprio – What's Eating Gilbert Grape as Arnold "Arnie" Grape; Ralph Fiennes – Schindler's List as Amon Göth; John Malkovich – In the Line of Fire as Mitch Leary; Sean Penn – Carlito's Way as David "Dave" Kleinfeld	Winona Ryder – The Age of Innocence as May Welland: Penelope Ann Miller – Carlito's Way as Gail; Rosie Perez – Fearless as Carla Rodrigo; Anna Paquin – The Piano as Flora McGrath; Emma Thompson – In the Name of the Father as Gareth Peirce
Best Director	Best Screenplay
Steven Spielberg – Schindler's List: Jane Campion – The Piano; Andrew Davis – The Fugitive; James Ivory – The Remains of the Day; Martin Scorsese – The Age of Innocence	Schindler's List – Steven Zaillian: Philadelphia – Ron Nyswaner; The Piano – Jane Campion; The Remains of the Day – Ruth Prawer Jhabvala; Short Cuts – Robert Altman and Frank Barhydt
Best Original Score	Best Original Song
Heaven & Earth – Kitaro: Three Colors: Blue – Zbigniew Preisner; The Nightmare Before Christmas – Danny Elfman; The Piano – Michael Nyman; Schindler's List – John Williams	"Streets of Philadelphia" performed by Bruce Springsteen – Philadelphia: "Again" – Poetic Justice; "The Day I Fall in Love" – Beethoven's 2nd; "Stay (Faraway, So Close!)" – Faraway, So Close!; "You Made Me the Thief of Your Heart" – In the Name of the Father
Best Foreign Language Film	
Farewell My Concubine (Ba wang bie ji) • Hong Kong: Flight of the Innocent (La corsa dell'innocente) • Italy; Justice (Justiz) • Germany; Three Colours: Blue (Trois couleurs: Bleu) • France; The Wedding Banquet (Xi yan) • Taiwan	

The following films received multiple nominations:

Nominations	Title
6	The Piano
6	Schindler's List
5	The Remains of the Day
4	The Age of Innocence
3	The Fugitive
3	In the Name of the Father
3	Philadelphia
3	Sleepless in Seattle
3	Three Colors: Blue (Trois Couleurs: Bleu)
2	Carlito's Way
2	Dave
2	Mrs. Doubtfire

The following films received multiple wins:

Wins	Film
3	Schindler's List
2	Philadelphia
2	Mrs. Doubtfire

=== Television ===
Best Television Series
Best Series – Drama	Best Series – Comedy or Musical
NYPD Blue: Dr. Quinn, Medicine Woman; Law & Order; Northern Exposure; Picket Fences; The Young Indiana Jones Chronicles	Seinfeld: Coach; Frasier; Home Improvement; Roseanne
Best Lead Actor in a Television Series
Best Actor – Drama Series	Best Actor – Comedy or Musical Series
David Caruso – NYPD Blue: Michael Moriarty – Law & Order; Rob Morrow – Northern Exposure; Carroll O'Connor – In the Heat of the Night; Tom Skerritt – Picket Fences	Jerry Seinfeld – Seinfeld: Tim Allen – Home Improvement; Kelsey Grammer – Frasier; Craig T. Nelson – Coach; Will Smith – The Fresh Prince of Bel-Air
Best Lead Actress in a Television Series
Best Actress – Drama Series	Best Actress – Comedy or Musical Series
Kathy Baker – Picket Fences: Heather Locklear – Melrose Place; Jane Seymour – Dr. Quinn, Medicine Woman; Janine Turner – Northern Exposure; Sela Ward – Sisters	Helen Hunt – Mad About You: Candice Bergen – Murphy Brown; Patricia Richardson – Home Improvement; Roseanne Barr – Roseanne; Katey Sagal – Married... with Children
Best Supporting Performance – Series, Miniseries or Television Film
Best Supporting Actor – Series, Miniseries or Television Film	Best Supporting Actress – Series, Miniseries or Television Movie
Beau Bridges – The Positively True Adventures of the Alleged Texas Cheerleader-Murdering Mom: Jason Alexander – Seinfeld; Dennis Franz – NYPD Blue; John Mahoney – Frasier; Jonathan Pryce – Barbarians at the Gate	Julia Louis-Dreyfus – Seinfeld: Ann-Margret – Alex Haley's Queen; Cynthia Gibb – Gypsy; Cecilia Peck – The Portrait; Theresa Saldana – The Commish
Best Actor – Miniseries or Television Film	Best Actress – Miniseries or Television Film
James Garner – Barbarians at the Gate: Peter Falk – Columbo: It's All in the Game; Jack Lemmon – A Life in the Theatre; Matthew Modine – And the Band Played On; Peter Strauss – Men Don't Tell	Bette Midler – Gypsy: Helena Bonham Carter – Fatal Deception: Mrs. Lee Harvey Oswald; Faye Dunaway – Columbo: It's All in the Game; Holly Hunter – The Positively True Adventures of the Alleged Texas Cheerleader-Murdering Mom; Anjelica Huston – Family Pictures
Best Miniseries or Television Film	
Barbarians at the Gate: And the Band Played On; Columbo: It's All in the Game; Gypsy; Heidi	

The following programs received multiple nominations:

Nominations	Title
4	Seinfeld
3	Barbarians at the Gate
3	Columbo: It's All in the Game
3	Frasier
3	Gypsy
3	Home Improvement
3	Northern Exposure
3	NYPD Blue
2	Coach
2	Dr. Quinn, Medicine Woman
2	Law & Order
2	Picket Fences
2	The Positively True Adventures of the Alleged Texas Cheerleader-Murdering Mom
2	Roseanne

The following films and programs received multiple wins:

Wins	Series
3	Seinfeld
2	NYPD Blue
2	Barbarians at the Gate

== Ceremony ==
=== Presenters ===
- Alan Alda
- Clint Black
- Pierce Brosnan
- Carol Burnett
- Kate Capshaw
- Tia Carrere
- Joan Chen
- Jeff Conaway
- John Corbett
- Tim Daly
- Laura Dern
- William Devane
- Morgan Freeman
- Andy Garcia
- Teri Garr
- Jeff Goldblum
- Lisa Hartman
- Charlton Heston
- Val Kilmer
- Angela Lansbury
- Juliette Lewis
- Marlee Matlin
- Al Pacino
- Gregory Peck
- Stefanie Powers
- Jason Priestley
- Maximilian Schell
- Christian Slater
- Wes Studi
- Courtney Thorne-Smith
- Jennifer Tilly
- Lindsay Wagner
- Robert Wagner
- Lesley Ann Warren
- Sam Waterston
- Alfre Woodard
- Vivian Wu
- Sean Young

== Awards breakdown ==
The following networks received multiple nominations:

Nominations	Network
16	ABC
14	CBS
13	NBC
7	HBO
2	TNT

The following network received multiple wins:

Wins	Network
3	NBC
2	ABC
2	HBO

== See also ==
- 66th Academy Awards
- 14th Golden Raspberry Awards
- 45th Primetime Emmy Awards
- 46th Primetime Emmy Awards
- 47th British Academy Film Awards
- 48th Tony Awards
- 1993 in film
- 1993 in American television
