= Manhattan Murder Mystery =

1993 film by Woody Allen

- Theatrical release poster
- Directed by: Woody Allen
- Written by: Woody Allen; Marshall Brickman
- Produced by: Robert Greenhut
- Starring: Alan Alda; Woody Allen; Anjelica Huston; Diane Keaton
- Cinematography: Carlo Di Palma
- Edited by: Susan E. Morse
- Distributed by: TriStar Pictures
- Release date: August 18, 1993 (United States)
- Running time: 107 minutes
- Country: United States
- Language: English
- Budget: $13.5 million (est.)
- Box office: $11.2 million (United States)

Manhattan Murder Mystery is a 1993 American black comedy mystery film directed by Woody Allen, which he wrote with Marshall Brickman, and starring Allen, Alan Alda, Anjelica Huston, and Diane Keaton. The film centers on a married couple's investigation of the death of their neighbor's wife.

The film began as an early draft of Annie Hall, which Allen co-wrote with Brickman. Eventually, the script evolved and principal photography took place in 1992 in New York City. It was released by TriStar Pictures on August 18, 1993 to positive reviews. Keaton was nominated for a Golden Globe Award for Best Actress – Motion Picture Comedy or Musical. This film marked the eighth and final collaboration between Allen and Keaton.

== Plot ==
Larry Lipton, an editor at HarperCollins, and his wife Carol have a pleasant encounter in the elevator with older neighbors, Paul and Lillian House. They are invited to an evening with the Houses where the women exchange information on exercise routines. The next day, Lillian dies of a heart attack, shocking the Liptons as she appeared robust and healthy. Carol becomes suspicious of Paul's cheerfulness after his wife's death. When she brings the widower a dessert, she finds a crematory urn under his kitchen sink that contradicts his story about Lillian's burial.

Carol decides to investigate and steals the key to the House apartment from the super. When Paul is away, she finds two tickets to Paris and hotel reservations with a woman named “Helen Moss.” Carol dials the last number dialed on Paul's phone, and the phone is answered by someone saying “Waldron”. Paul returns while Carol is snooping, narrowly missing her hiding under the bed, but she manages to sneak out undetected. Paul later finds her reading glasses under the bed, but Carol pretends she lost them on the first visit, supposing the glasses were kicked under the bed. Appalled at his wife’s breaking and entering, Larry wants her to stop. Obsessed, Carol engages the cooperation of their more adventurous close friend, Ted, who becomes as obsessed as Carol with the mystery.

Carol and Ted track down Helen Moss, an actress, whom they surveil. A few days later, Carol spots a woman who looks identical to Lillian on a passing bus. Larry suggests she has a twin, but Ted finds out she does not. Ted and Carol follow the bus route to the end, discovering the shabby Hotel Waldron. Returning later, Carol and Larry find Lillian dead in the bedroom. The responding police find no trace of the body. Carol surmises that Paul was hiding in the closet when they found the body and then moved the body. After searching the hotel room a second time, Carol and Larry are trapped when the hotel elevator stops. When Carol tries to climb out through the emergency exit panel, Lillian's body drops through the opening. They escape through the hotel basement and see Paul putting the body in a car. They follow him and witness the body being dropped into an industrial furnace.

Marcia Fox, an author who Larry publishes, is drawn into the amateur investigation when Larry sets her up on a date with Ted. Marcia theorizes that the dead body in the Houses’ apartment was Lillian's wealthy sister, who resembled her and had a heart attack while visiting the Houses. The Houses took advantage of the situation by claiming Lillian had died so Lillian could impersonate her sister, hiding at the Waldron Hotel, while cleaning out her sister’s bank accounts and liquidating her assets. After getting the funds, Paul double-crossed Lillian and killed her so he could run away with the younger Helen. Marcia devises a plan to trick Paul into incriminating himself by using Helen, someone he trusts, to claim she saw Lillian’s unincinerated body.

Ted, a playwright and theater owner, sets up a false audition for Helen, having her read from a phony script with innocuous text he wrote while they film her. Splicing together words from the recorded script, they create a phone call from Helen to Paul warning that she has been shown Lillian’s unincinerated body by blackmailers who want $200,000 to give up the body. Using five recorders with different combinations of phrases, they respond reasonably well to Paul’s anticipated questions to “Helen”, and cut the conversation short by saying, “I have to hang up.”

The plan backfires when Paul kidnaps Carol and demands Lillian's body in exchange for her. At the run-down second-run movie theater Paul owns, where Carol is being held, Larry dodges Paul’s bullets in a film noir chase parody echoing the in-process showing of Orson Welles's The Lady from Shanghai during a similar shootout-in-a-room-full-of-mirrors sequence in the film. Mrs. Dalton, Paul's erstwhile loyal assistant and jealous spurned aging former lover, shoots Paul with a bitter reference to being used and discarded. Larry rescues Carol, and they call the police. Marcia's theory is proven correct; and Larry and Carol and Ted and Marcia pair off and enjoy separate celebratory dinners.

== Cast ==
- Diane Keaton as Carol Lipton
- Woody Allen as Larry Lipton
- Alan Alda as Ted
- Anjelica Huston as Marcia Fox
- Jerry Adler as Paul House
- Lynn Cohen as Lillian House
- Melanie Norris as Helen Moss
- Marge Redmond as Mrs. Dalton
- Joy Behar as Marilyn
- Ron Rifkin as Sy
- Zach Braff as Nick Lipton
- Sylvia Kauders as Neighbour
- Vincent Pastore as Man In Restaurant
- Aida Turturro as cleaning lady

== Production ==
Allen started Manhattan Murder Mystery as an early draft of Annie Hall, but he did not feel that it was substantial enough, and he decided to go in a different direction. He put off making the film for years because he felt it was too lightweight, "like an airplane book read". Allen decided to revisit the material in the early 1990s. He contacted Marshall Brickman, who co-wrote Annie Hall, and they developed the story further. The role of Carol was originally written for Mia Farrow, but the part was recast when she and Allen ended their relationship and became embroiled in a custody battle over their three children. Allegations in the media claimed that changes were made to the film in what was "definitely a reaction" to Allen's relationship problems, including the casting of Anjelica Huston as "a much younger first time novelist" with whom Allen's character became romantically involved (Huston was 41 during production).

In the fall of 1992, Allen called Diane Keaton and asked her to fill in for Farrow, and she immediately accepted. When asked if he had re-written the script to fit Keaton's talents, Allen said:

No, I couldn't do that. In a regular script I would have done that upon hiring Diane Keaton. But I couldn't [here] because it's a murder mystery, and it's very tightly plotted, so it's very hard to make big changes... I had written [the part] more to what Mia likes to do. Mia likes to do funny things, but she's not as broad a comedian as Diane is. So Diane made this part funnier than I wrote it.

Making the film was a form of escape for Allen because the "past year was so exhausting that I wanted to just indulge myself in something I could relax and enjoy". He also found it very therapeutic working with Keaton again. After getting over her initial panic in her first scene with Alan Alda, Keaton and Allen slipped back into their old rhythm. After she had trouble with that scene, Allen decided to re-shoot it. In the meantime, she worked with her acting coach and did other scenes that went well. According to Allen, Keaton changed the dynamic of the film because he "always look(s) sober and normal compared to Keaton. I turn into the straight man". Huston said that the set was "oddly free of anxiety, introspection and pain", and this was due to Keaton's presence.

The film was shot in the fall of 1992 on the streets of Greenwich Village, the Upper East Side and the Upper West Side. Allen had cinematographer Carlo Di Palma rely on hand-held cameras, "swiveling restlessly from one room to another, or zooming in abruptly for a close look."

Larry and Carol Lipton's apartment is at 200 East 78th Street, between 2nd and 3rd Avenue. Allen staged a climactic shoot-out in a roomful of mirrors that, according to Allen, mimicked a similar shoot-out in Orson Welles' film The Lady from Shanghai.

The film marked Allen's second and final film with TriStar Pictures, and it was speculated in the press that this deal was not extended because of Allen's personal problems or that his films were not very profitable. Allen, however, denied these allegations in interviews at the time. Zach Braff, who was 17 years old at the time, appeared in one scene as Nick Lipton, the son of Larry and Carol. Years later, he said: "When I look at that scene now, all I can see is the terror in my eyes.”

== Soundtrack ==
- I Happen to Like New York (1930) – Written by Cole Porter – Performed by Bobby Short
- The Best Things in Life Are Free (1927) – Music by Ray Henderson – Lyrics by Lew Brown and Buddy G. DeSylva – Performed by Erroll Garner
- The Hallway (1944) – Written by Miklós Rózsa
- Der fliegende Holländer (The Flying Dutchman)(1843) – Written by Richard Wagner – Performed by Chor der Staatsoper München
- Take Five (1959) – Written by Paul Desmond – Performed by The Dave Brubeck Quartet
- I'm in the Mood for Love (1935) – Music by Jimmy McHugh – Lyrics by Dorothy Fields – Performed by Erroll Garner
- Big Noise from Winnetka (1938) – Music by Ray Bauduc and Bob Haggart – Lyrics by Gil Rodin and Bob Crosby
- Out of Nowhere (1931) – Music by Johnny Green – Lyrics by Edward Heyman – Performed by Coleman Hawkins
- Have You Met Miss Jones? (1937) – Music by Richard Rodgers – Lyrics by Lorenz Hart – Performed by the Art Tatum-Ben Webster Quartet
- Guys and Dolls: Overture (1951) – Written by Frank Loesser – Performed by the New Broadway Cast (1992)
- Sing, Sing, Sing (With a Swing) (1936) – Written by Louis Prima – Performed by Benny Goodman and His Orchestra
- Misty (1954) – Written and performed by Erroll Garner

== Reception ==
=== Box office ===
Manhattan Murder Mystery opened on August 18, 1993, in 268 theaters and made USD $2 million in its opening weekend. It went on to gross $11.3 million in North America, below its estimated $13.5 million budget. Its £1,920,825 in box office made it the number-one film in the United Kingdom for the weekend ending January 23, 1994.

=== Critical response ===
The film was well received by critics and holds a 94% positive "Fresh" rating on the review aggregator Rotten Tomatoes, with 29 positive out of 31 reviews. Metacritic, which uses a weighted average, assigned the film a score of 71 out of 100, based on 29 critics, indicating "generally favorable" reviews.

In his review for Newsweek, David Ansen wrote, "On screen, Keaton and Allen have always been made for each other: they still strike wonderfully ditsy sparks". USA Today gave the film four out of four stars, and advised fans to forget Allen's tabloid woes because "there's a better reason why Allen fans should give it a shot. It's very, very funny, and there's no mystery about that". Jonathan Rosenbaum called it a "welcome return to straight-ahead entertainment, after 15 years of slogging through art-house hand-me-downs, happily coincided with a return to Diane Keaton as his leading lady, and she deftly steals the show". Janet Maslin called it a "dated detective story" but also wrote, "it achieves a gentle, nostalgic grace and a hint of un-self-conscious wisdom". Desson Howe, in The Washington Post, complained that there was "little 'new'" in this film. Allen and Keaton are essentially playing Alvy Singer and Annie Hall gone middle-aged".

=== Nominations ===
- 1994 César Awards: Best Foreign Film
- 48th British Academy Film Awards: Best Actress in a Supporting Role, Anjelica Huston
- 51st Golden Globe Awards: Best Performance by an Actress in a Leading Role – Comedy/Musical, Diane Keaton
