= The Crossing Guard =

1995 film by Sean Penn

- Promotional film poster
- Directed by: Sean Penn
- Written by: Sean Penn
- Produced by: Sean Penn; David S. Hamburger
- Starring: Jack Nicholson; David Morse; Robin Wright; Anjelica Huston
- Cinematography: Vilmos Zsigmond
- Edited by: Jay Cassidy
- Music by: Jack Nitzsche
- Production company: Miramax Films
- Distributed by: Miramax Films
- Release dates: September 1995 (Deauville); November 16, 1995 (U.S.)
- Running time: 111 minutes
- Country: United States
- Language: English
- Budget: $9 million
- Box office: $7 million

The Crossing Guard is a 1995 American drama film written, produced, and directed by Sean Penn. It stars Jack Nicholson, David Morse, Robin Wright and Anjelica Huston. The film tells the story of Freddy Gale (Nicholson), a man who has been tormented for more than five years by his daughter's death in a car accident. When he finds out that the man who was responsible for the death is being released from prison, he decides to seek vengeance.

The film was entered into the 52nd Venice International Film Festival, where it competed for the Golden Lion. It was released in the United States by Miramax Films on November 16, 1995. It was a commercial disappointment, but received generally positive reviews from critics. Huston was nominated for a Golden Globe Award and a Screen Actors Guild Award for her performance, and Morse was nominated for an Independent Spirit Award for Best Supporting Male.

The Crossing Guard was the last film scored by Jack Nitzsche before his death in 2000.

== Plot ==
Jewelry store owner Freddy Gale has been tormented for five years following the death of his daughter, Emily. Once a devoted husband and father, he is now an alcoholic who spends his nights in strip clubs, sleeping with strippers. When John Booth, the drunk driver who killed his daughter, is released from prison, Freddy visits his ex-wife Mary and reveals to her that he plans to kill Booth. She begs him not to, but an altercation occurs, with Mary's husband confronting Freddy. The two men briefly fight, and Freddy leaves.

Booth resides in a trailer outside his parents' house. He merely desires to resume his life outside of prison, although he is haunted and remorseful for killing Emily. One night, Freddy arrives at the Booth residence, armed with a pistol. He clumsily breaks into the trailer and tries to shoot, but he forgot to load a magazine. John calmly explains he won't call the police and will let Freddy kill him, but asks for some time to savor his freedom. Freddy gives John three days to live.

John tries to live his life as best as he can before the third day arrives. He meets an artist named JoJo at a friend's party. They have a brief romance before she realizes that he cannot let go of the mistake he made. He reveals to her that when he hit Emily, he came to her side as she was dying and Emily apologized to him for "not having looked both ways." John goes to Emily's grave and leaves flowers, but he leaves when he sees Mary there.

On the third day, Freddy phones Mary and breaks down in tears as he tells her of a terrible nightmare he had. In the nightmare, he is driving by his daughter's school and stops at a crosswalk where children (including a living Emily) wait. He sees that John Booth is the crossing guard. Freddy then sees himself run over all of the children, even Emily. Freddy and Mary meet at a diner, and Mary tells him that he is beyond her help; Freddy becomes enraged and curses her. After Mary leaves, Freddy gets drunk and starts to drive to John's house. John waits in his trailer. A police officer stops Freddy and arrests him for drunk driving. Before the police can take him in, however, Freddy grabs his pistol and runs away. He breaks into a home and hides in a little girl's room. The girl guides the police away, and Freddy thanks her and leaves.

Freddy arrives at John's trailer and waits before he enters. John abruptly jumps from a corner with a rifle in hand. Freddy tells him since he is on the run, on his property, and armed, John should be able to get away with killing him. There is a standoff as they point guns at each other. However, John drops his rifle and runs away. Freddy follows him. After a lengthy chase across the city, Freddy catches John climbing a fence and fires at him. John is only superficially wounded and continues running. Freddy continues his pursuit until he realizes that John has led him to the graveyard where Emily is buried. John talks silently to the grave and finally says, "Your daddy's coming". Freddy hands John his pistol and cries over the grave, apologizing to his daughter. John takes Freddy's hand as the sun rises.

== Cast ==
- Jack Nicholson as Freddy Gale
- David Morse as John Booth
- Anjelica Huston as Mary
- Robin Wright as Jojo
- Piper Laurie as Helen Booth
- Richard Bradford as Stuart Booth
- Priscilla Barnes as Verna
- David Baerwald as Peter
- Robbie Robertson as Roger
- John Savage as Bobby
- Kellita Smith as Tanya
- Kari Wuhrer as Mia
- Richard C. Sarafian as Sonny Ventura
- Joe Viterelli as Joe
- Ryô Ishibashi as Jeffrey
- Leo Penn as Hank
- Eileen Ryan as Disgruntled Store Customer
- Penelope Allen as Woman on Bus

== Reception ==
=== Box office ===
Despite the positive critical reception, the film grossed only $868,979 in the United States and Canada. It grossed $7 million worldwide, against a budget of $9 million.

=== Critical reception ===
The film received generally positive reviews with the review tallying website Rotten Tomatoes reporting a score of 76% based on 29 reviews.

Roger Ebert found the midnight conversation in a diner between Freddy and Mary, where they talk over their life together, as having an "eerie resonance" to the actors' real-life past relationship. The acting overall is "wonderful" but Nicholson's presence is "too commanding on the screen to be squeezed inside Freddy," Ebert wrote. Nonetheless, with this film and The Indian Runner, he asserts that Sean Penn proves he's a "genuine director."

=== Awards and nominations ===
Institution	Year	Category	Nominee	Result
Film Independent Spirit Awards	1996	Best Supporting Male	David Morse	Nominated
Golden Globes	1996	Best Supporting Actress – Motion Picture	Anjelica Huston	Nominated
Screen Actors Guild Award	1996	Outstanding Performance by a Female Actor in a Supporting Role	Anjelica Huston	Nominated
Venice Film Festival	1995	Golden Lion	Sean Penn	Nominated

Anjelica Huston's performance in the film was praised and she received nominations for Best Supporting Actress from the Hollywood Foreign Press and the Screen Actors Guild (SAG). She lost out on the Golden Globe to Mira Sorvino for Mighty Aphrodite and the SAG award to Kate Winslet for Sense and Sensibility.

== Soundtrack ==
- "Missing" written and performed by Bruce Springsteen
- "Room At The Top" performed by Adam Ant; written by Ant, André Cymone and Marco Pirroni
- "Hopping To Health" written and performed by Sophia L. Cassidy
- "Any Time, Any Place, Any Where" written and performed by Hadda Brooks
- "King's Highway" written and performed by Joe Henry
- "Whatta Man" performed by Salt-N-Pepa, written by Hurby "Luv Bug" Azor, Cheryl "Salt" James and Dave Crawford
- "The Ubiquitous Mr. Lovegrove" performed by Dead Can Dance, written by Lisa Gerrard and Brendan Perry
- "Born A Cowboy" written and performed by David Baerwald
- "Unspoken" written and performed by Baerwald
- "I Want A Little Sugar In My Bowl" performed by Brooks, written by Nina Simone
- "Herida de Amor (Love Hurts)" performed by Yndio, written by Boudleaux Bryant
- "Emily" written and performed by Jewel
- "Freddy and Mia" written and performed by Kari Wuhrer
- "Good Ship Lollipop" performed by Shirley Temple, written by Richard A. Whiting and Sidney Clare
