= Family Pictures =

1993 American television film

- Genre: Drama
- Based on: Family Pictures by Sue Miller
- Screenplay by: Jennifer Miller
- Directed by: Philip Saville
- Starring: Anjelica Huston; Sam Neill; Kyra Sedgwick; Dermot Mulroney; Lindsay G. Merrithew
- Music by: Johnny Harris
- Country of origin: United States
- Original language: English

Production
- Executive producers: Les Alexander; Don Enright
- Producers: Les Alexander; Joseph Broido; Jennifer Miller
- Production location: Ontario
- Cinematography: Elemér Ragályi
- Editor: Debra Karen
- Running time: 183 minutes
- Production companies: Alexander/Enright & Associates; Hearst Entertainment

Original release
- Network: ABC
- Release: March 21, 1993

Family Pictures is a 1993 American made-for-television drama film based on the novel of the same name by Sue Miller. It was directed by Philip Saville and stars Anjelica Huston, Sam Neill, Kyra Sedgwick, and Dermot Mulroney.

== Plot ==
The film opens with Nina Eberlin, the fourth in a family of six children, going to visit her divorced parents. Looking at some old photographs, she begins to tell the story of how her parents, Lainey and David, learned that her younger brother Randall had autism, and how the stress that this placed on them eventually lead to the breakdown of their marriage.

== Cast ==
- Anjelica Huston as Lainey Eberlin
- Sam Neill as David Eberlin
- Kyra Sedgwick as Nina Eberlin
- Dermot Mulroney as Mack Eberlin
- Jamie Harrold as Randall Eberlin
- Lindsay G. Merrithew as Will Price
- Anya Alessandroni as Nina (age 3)
- Alexandra Petrocci as Nina (age 5–6)
- Laura Bertram as Nina (age 12–15)
- Jared Wall as Mack (age 4)
- Corey Sevier as Mack (age 8)
- Sean Ryan as Mack (age 11)
- Joshua Ragetlie as Randall (age 2)
- Anthony Antonacci as Randall (age 6)
- Jared Cook as Randall (age 6)

== Accolades ==
The film earned Anjelica Huston a nomination for Best Actress – Miniseries or Television Film at the 51st Golden Globe Awards. It was also nominated for Outstanding Miniseries and Outstanding Individual Achievement in Writing in a Miniseries or a Special at the 45th Primetime Emmy Awards.
