= List of Anne Hathaway performances =

Performances by the American actress Anne Hathaway

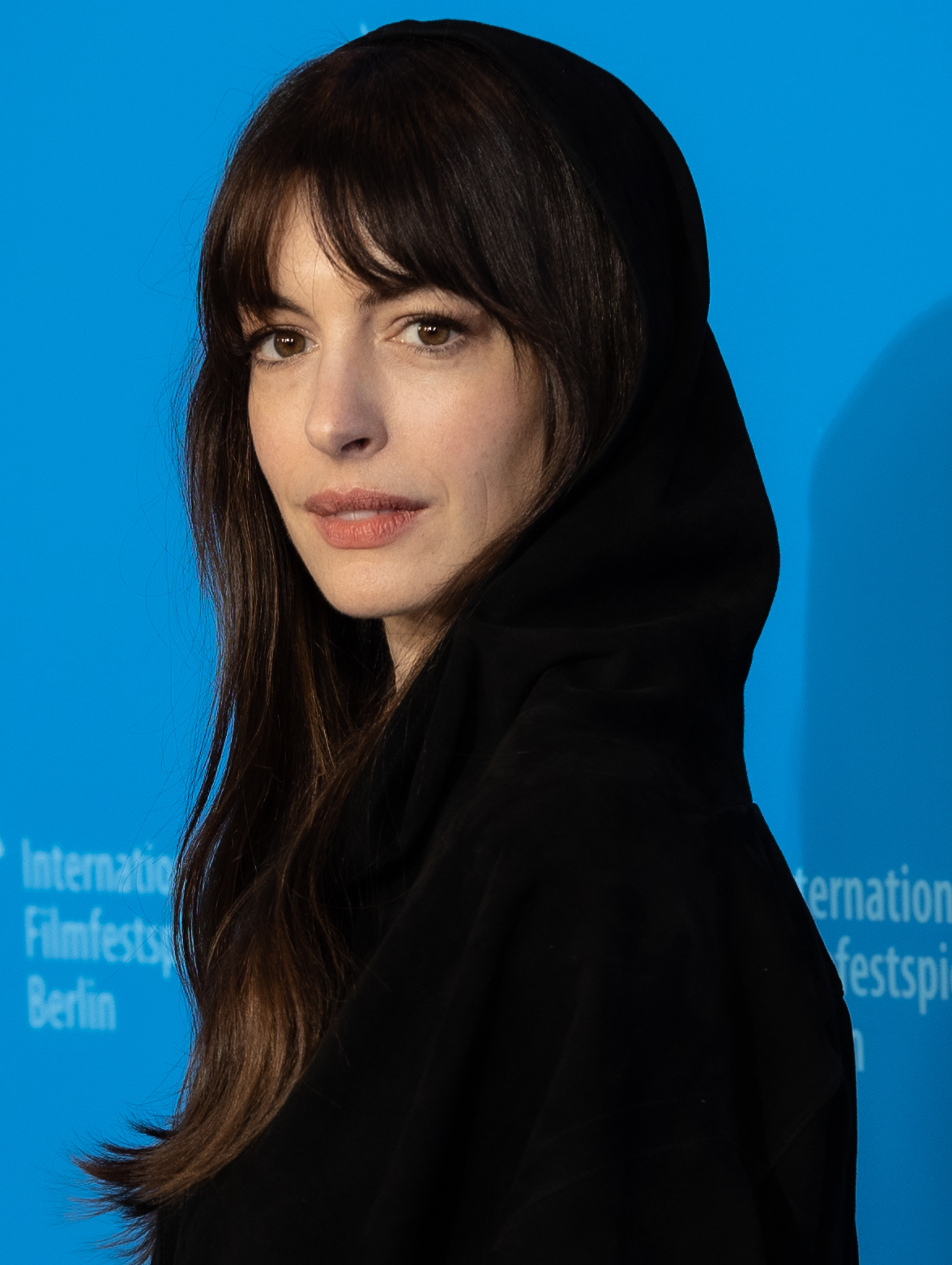
Hathaway in 2023

Anne Hathaway is an American actress. She made her acting debut in the television series Get Real (1999–2000) before starring in her breakthrough role of Mia Thermopolis in the successful Disney comedy The Princess Diaries (2001). The following year, she made her New York stage debut in the Encores! production of Carnival!, followed by a string of family films including Nicholas Nickleby (2002) and Ella Enchanted (2004), both of which were box office flops. She also starred in The Princess Diaries 2: Royal Engagement (2004). In 2005, she appeared in the drama Brokeback Mountain, and the following year she starred with Meryl Streep in the highly successful comedy-drama The Devil Wears Prada. Hathaway portrayed novelist Jane Austen in the biographical drama Becoming Jane in 2007.

Hathaway was nominated for the Academy Award for Best Actress for playing a recovering alcoholic in the drama Rachel Getting Married (2008). (Note: Attributed to multiple references:) She played Viola in The Public Theater's 2009 production of Twelfth Night, which earned her a Drama Desk Award for Outstanding Actress in a Play. In 2010, she won a Primetime Emmy Award for Outstanding Voice-Over Performance for providing her voice for an episode of The Simpsons. The same year, she played the White Queen in Tim Burton's fantasy adventure film Alice in Wonderland. For her portrayal of a free-spirited artist in Love & Other Drugs (2010), Hathaway earned a Golden Globe Award nomination for Best Actress – Motion Picture Comedy or Musical. During this period, she also starred in the box-office hits Get Smart (2008), Bride Wars (2009), and Valentine's Day (2010). She then voiced a Spix's macaw named Jewel in the animated comedy adventure film Rio (2011) and its sequel Rio 2 (2014).

Hathaway's biggest commercial success came in 2012 when she played Selina Kyle / Catwoman in Christopher Nolan's superhero film The Dark Knight Rises, which grossed over $1 billion worldwide. The same year, her performance as the prostitute Fantine in Tom Hooper's musical Les Misérables earned her the Academy Award for Best Supporting Actress. In 2014, she played a NASA scientist in Nolan's Interstellar, and she was nominated for a Drama League Award for Distinguished Performance for her portrayal of a fighter pilot in the play Grounded (2015). Hathaway later had starring roles in the commercially successful comedy-dramas The Intern (2015), Ocean's 8 (2018), and The Hustle (2019). After appearing in Eileen in 2023, she starred in five films in 2026: The Devil Wears Prada 2, Verity, The End of Oak Street, Mother Mary, and Nolan's The Odyssey.

== Film ==
Key
| † | Denotes films that have not yet been released |

| Year | Title | Role | Notes | Ref. |
|---|---|---|---|---|
| 2001 | The Princess Diaries | Amelia "Mia" Thermopolis | | |
| 2001 | The Other Side of Heaven | Jean Sabin | | |
| 2002 | Nicholas Nickleby | Madeline Bray | | |
| 2003 | The Cat Returns | Haru Yoshioka (voice) | English dub | |
| 2004 | Ella Enchanted | Ella of Frell | | |
| 2004 | The Princess Diaries 2: Royal Engagement | Amelia "Mia" Thermopolis | | |
| 2005 | Hoodwinked! | Red Puckett (voice) | | |
| 2005 | Havoc | Allison Lang | | |
| 2005 | Brokeback Mountain | Lureen Newsome Twist | | |
| 2006 | The Devil Wears Prada | Andrea "Andy" Sachs | | |
| 2007 | Becoming Jane | Jane Austen | | |
| 2007 | A Place in Time | Herself | Documentary | |
| 2008 | Get Smart | Agent 99 | | |
| 2008 | Get Smart's Bruce and Lloyd: Out of Control | Agent 99 | Uncredited cameo | |
| 2008 | Rachel Getting Married | Kym Buchman | | |
| 2008 | Passengers | Claire Summers | | |
| 2009 | Bride Wars | Emma Allen | | |
| 2009 | PoliWood | Herself | Documentary | |
| 2009 | Valentino: The Last Emperor | Herself | Documentary | |
| 2010 | Valentine's Day | Liz Curran | | |
| 2010 | Alice in Wonderland | Mirana / White Queen | | |
| 2010 | Love & Other Drugs | Maggie Murdock | | |
| 2010 | 10 Mountains 10 Years | Narrator (voice) | Documentary | |
| 2011 | Rio | Jewel (voice) | | |
| 2011 | One Day | Emma Morley | | |
| 2012 | The Dark Knight Rises | Selina Kyle / Catwoman | | |
| 2012 | Les Misérables | Fantine | | |
| 2013 | Girl Rising | Narrator (voice) | Documentary | |
| 2013 | Don Jon | Emily Lombardo | Cameo | |
| 2014 | Song One | Franny Ellis | Also producer | |
| 2014 | Rio 2 | Jewel (voice) | | |
| 2014 | Don Peyote | Agent of TRUTH | Cameo | |
| 2014 | Interstellar | Dr. Amelia Brand | | |
| 2015 | The Intern | Jules Ostin | | |
| 2016 | Alice Through the Looking Glass | Mirana / White Queen | | |
| 2016 | Colossal | Gloria | Also executive producer | |
| 2018 | Ocean's 8 | Daphne Kluger | | |
| 2019 | Serenity | Karen Zariakas | | |
| 2019 | The Hustle | Josephine Chesterfield | | |
| 2019 | Dark Waters | Sarah Barlage Bilott | | |
| 2020 | The Last Thing He Wanted | Elena McMahon | | |
| 2020 | The Witches | The Grand High Witch | | |
| 2021 | Locked Down | Linda | | |
| 2022 | Armageddon Time | Esther Graff | | |
| 2023 | Eileen | Rebecca Saint John | | |
| 2023 | She Came to Me | Patricia Jessup-Lauddem | Also producer | |
| 2024 | Mothers' Instinct | Celine Jennings | Also producer | |
| 2024 | The Idea of You | Solène Marchand | Also producer | |
| 2026 | Mother Mary | Mother Mary | | |
| 2026 | The Devil Wears Prada 2 | Andrea "Andy" Sachs | | |
| 2026 | The Odyssey | Penelope | | |
| 2026 | The End of Oak Street | Denise Platt | | |
| 2026 | Verity | Verity Crawford | Also producer | |
| 2027 | Alone at Dawn † | TBA | Post-production | |

== Television ==
| Year | Title | Role | Notes | Ref(s) |
|---|---|---|---|---|
| 1999–2000 | Get Real | Meghan Green | Main cast (22 episodes) | |
| 2007 | Elmo's Christmas Countdown | Herself | Television special | |
| 2008–2018 | Saturday Night Live | Herself / various | 3 episodes as host, 2 episodes as guest | |
| 2009–2012 | The Simpsons | Jenny / Princess Penelope (voice) | 3 episodes | |
| 2010–2011 | Family Guy | Various voices | 3 episodes | |
| 2011 | 83rd Academy Awards | Host | Television special; co-host with James Franco | |
| 2015 | HitRecord on TV | Vivica Virus | Episode: "Re: The Number Two" | |
| 2015 | Lip Sync Battle | Herself | Episode: "Anne Hathaway vs. Emily Blunt" | |
| 2016 | Documentary Now! | Herself | Episode: "Mr. Runner Up: My Life as an Oscar Bridesmaid, Part 2" | |
| 2019 | Modern Love | Lexi | 2 episodes | |
| 2020 | Sesame Street: Elmo's Playdate | Herself | Television special | |
| 2021 | RuPaul's Drag Race | Herself | Episode: "Social Media: The Unverified Rusical" | |
| 2021 | Solos | Leah | Episode: "LEAH" | |
| 2022 | WeCrashed | Rebekah Neumann | Miniseries; also executive producer | |
| 2022 | StoryBots: Answer Time | Secret Agent Lady | Episode: "Lasers" | |

== Theater ==
| Year | Title | Role(s) | Venue | Ref(s) |
|---|---|---|---|---|
| 2002 | Carnival! | Lili Daurier | New York City Center, Off-Broadway | |
| 2003 | The Woman in White | Laura Fairlie | Sydmonton Workshop | |
| 2005 | Children and Art | Performer | New Amsterdam Theatre, Broadway | |
| 2009 | Twelfth Night | Viola | Delacorte Theater, Off-Broadway | |
| 2015 | Grounded | Pilot | The Public Theater, Off-Broadway | |
| 2017 | The Children's Monologues | Woman with Unfaithful Lover | Carnegie Hall, Concert | |
| 2024 | Gutenberg! The Musical! | Producer (one night only) | James Earl Jones Theatre, Broadway | |

== Discography ==
=== Soundtrack albums ===
| Title | Album details |
|---|---|
| Mother Mary: Greatest Hits | Released: April 17, 2026; Label: A24 Music; Format: Digital download, streaming |

=== Charted songs ===
| Title | Year | Peak chart positions | | | | | Album |
| Title | Year | CAN | ESP | IRL | UK | US | Album |
|---|---|---|---|---|---|---|---|
| "I Dreamed a Dream" | 2012 | 77 | 21 | 26 | 22 | 69 | Les Misérables: Highlights from the Motion Picture Soundtrack |

=== Guest appearances ===
| Song | Year | Artist | Album |
|---|---|---|---|
| "Don't Go Breaking My Heart" | 2004 | Jesse McCartney and Anne Hathaway | Ella Enchanted (soundtrack) |
| "You Make Me Feel Like Dancing (Remix)" | 2004 | Anne Hathaway | Ella Enchanted (soundtrack) |
| "Somebody to Love" | 2004 | Anne Hathaway | Ella Enchanted (soundtrack) |
| "Great Big World" | 2005 | Anne Hathaway | Hoodwinked (Original Motion Picture Soundtrack) |
| "Take, O Take Those Lips Away" | 2009 | Anne Hathaway and Illyrian Marching Band | Twelfth Night |
| "Full Phathom Five" | 2009 | Anne Hathaway, Hem, and Audra McDonald | Twelfth Night |
| "Come Away Death" | 2009 | Anne Hathaway, David Pittu, Raúl Esparza, and Illyrian Marching Band | Twelfth Night |
| "Real in Rio" | 2011 | Anne Hathaway, Jesse Eisenberg, Jamie Foxx, George Lopez, will.i.am, and The Rio Singers with Hollywood | Rio |
| "Hot Wings (I Wanna Party)" | 2011 | Anne Hathaway, will.i.am, and Jamie Foxx | Rio |
| "At the End of the Day" | 2012 | Hugh Jackman, Anne Hathaway, Foreman, Factory Girls, and Cast | Les Misérables: Highlights from the Motion Picture Soundtrack |
| "I Dreamed a Dream" | 2012 | Anne Hathaway | Les Misérables: Highlights from the Motion Picture Soundtrack |
| "Epilogue" | 2012 | Amanda Seyfried, Anne Hathaway, Colm Wilkinson, Eddie Redmayne, and Hugh Jackman | Les Misérables: Highlights from the Motion Picture Soundtrack |
| "What is Love" | 2014 | Janelle Monáe, Jamie Foxx, Anne Hathaway, and Jesse Eisenberg | Rio 2 |
| "Don't Go Away" | 2014 | Anne Hathaway and Flavia Maia | Rio 2 |
| "Afraid of Heights" | 2015 | Anne Hathaway and Johnny Flynn | Song One: Original Motion Picture Soundtrack |
| "At the Ballet" (from A Chorus Line) | 2016 | Barbra Streisand, Daisy Ridley, and Anne Hathaway | Encore: Movie Partners Sing Broadway |

== See also ==
- List of awards and nominations received by Anne Hathaway
