= Anne Hathaway =

American actress (born 1982)

- Hathaway in 2026
- Born: Anne Jacqueline Hathaway; November 12, 1982 (age 44); Brooklyn, New York City, U.S.
- Occupation: Actress
- Years active: 1999–present
- Works: Full list
- Spouse: Adam Shulman (m. 2012)
- Children: 2
- Awards: Full list

Anne Jacqueline Hathaway (born November 12, 1982) is an American actress. Her work encompasses both screen and stage, and her accolades include an Academy Award, a British Academy Film Award, a Golden Globe Award, a Screen Actors Guild Award, and a Primetime Emmy Award. (Note: Attributed to multiple references:) Her films have grossed more than $6.7 billion worldwide.

As a teenager, Hathaway was cast in the television series Get Real (1999–2000). Her breakthrough came when she starred as Mia Thermopolis in her debut film, the Disney comedy The Princess Diaries (2001). In 2005, she played more mature roles in the dramas Havoc and Brokeback Mountain. The comedy The Devil Wears Prada (2006), in which Hathaway played an assistant to a fashion magazine editor, was her biggest commercial success to that point; she would reprise her role twenty years later in The Devil Wears Prada 2. She played a recovering alcoholic in the drama Rachel Getting Married (2008), which earned her a nomination for the Academy Award for Best Actress. She subsequently appeared in the commercially successful romantic films Bride Wars (2009), Valentine's Day (2010) and Love & Other Drugs (2010).

In 2012, Hathaway starred as Catwoman in The Dark Knight Rises, her first of three collaborations with director Christopher Nolan. That year, she also played Fantine, a prostitute dying of tuberculosis, in the musical romantic drama Les Misérables, for which she earned multiple accolades, including an Academy Award for Best Supporting Actress. She went on to play a scientist in Interstellar (2014), the owner of an online fashion site in The Intern (2015), a haughty actress in Ocean's 8 (2018), a single mother in The Idea of You (2024), and Penelope in The Odyssey (2026).

In television, Hathaway won a Primetime Emmy Award for her guest voice role on The Simpsons in 2010, and starred in the miniseries WeCrashed (2022). She has sung for soundtracks and performed on the New York stage, and she advocates for gender equality as a UN Women Goodwill Ambassador. Hathaway is married to Adam Shulman, with whom she has two children.

== Early life and education ==
Anne Jacqueline Hathaway was born on November 12, 1982, in the Brooklyn borough of New York City. She is of Irish, English, German and French descent. Her father, Gerald, was a labor attorney, and her mother, Kate (née McCauley), is a former actress. Hathaway's maternal grandfather was the WIP (AM) Philadelphia radio personality Joe McCauley. According to The Daily Telegraph, Hathaway was named after William Shakespeare's wife. She has an older brother, Michael, and a younger brother, Thomas. When Hathaway was six years old, the family moved to Millburn, New Jersey, where she was raised.

Hathaway became fascinated with the stage at age eight, when she watched her mother portray the prostitute Fantine in the first national tour of Les Misérables. Hathaway's parents were not keen on allowing her to pursue an acting career, and her mother eventually quit acting to raise Hathaway and her brothers. Hathaway was raised as Roman Catholic with what she considers to be "really strong values" and wished to be a nun during her childhood, but acting was always a high priority for her. Her relationship with the Catholic Church changed at age 15 after she learned her older brother was gay. Her family left the church, joining the Episcopal Church because of its acceptance of homosexuality, but they eventually left that church too. In 2009, Hathaway described her religious beliefs as "a work in progress".

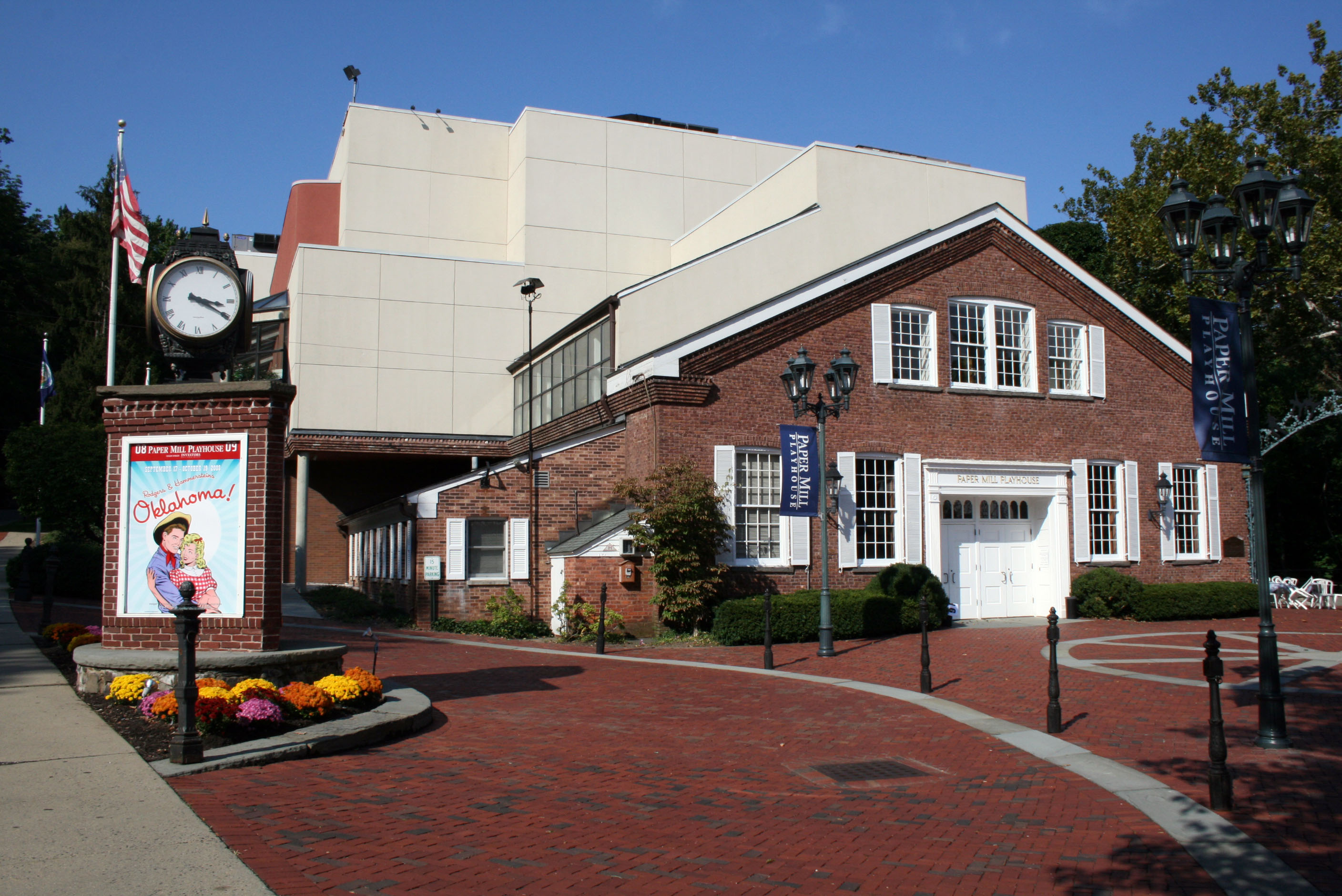
During her youth, Hathaway appeared in several productions at Paper Mill Playhouse in Millburn, New Jersey.

Hathaway attended Brooklyn Heights Montessori School and Wyoming Elementary School in Millburn. She studied at the American Academy of Dramatic Arts in 1993 and became the first teenager admitted into the Barrow Group Theater Company's acting program. She attended Millburn High School, where she played soccer and took part in many plays, including Once Upon a Mattress, in which she portrayed Winnifred. She also appeared in the plays Jane Eyre and Gigi at New Jersey's Paper Mill Playhouse. Between 1998 and 1999, Hathaway sang soprano with the All-Eastern U.S. High School Honors Chorus at Carnegie Hall and acted in plays at Seton Hall Preparatory School in West Orange, New Jersey. Three days after a chorus performance at Carnegie Hall, Hathaway was cast as Meghan Green in the short-lived Fox television series Get Real, alongside Jon Tenney, Debrah Farentino and Jesse Eisenberg. Hathaway suffered from depression and anxiety as a teenager; in 2008, she stated she had "grown from" it.

Hathaway spent several semesters as an English major and political science minor at Vassar College in Poughkeepsie, New York; she missed her first semester due to the production schedule of her first film, The Princess Diaries (2001). She later transferred to New York University's Gallatin School of Individualized Study. Hathaway said she never regretted not completing her degree, as she enjoyed being with others who "were trying to grow up". Early in Hathaway's film career, her acting style and appearance were likened to Judy Garland—whom she cites as one of her favorite actresses—and Audrey Hepburn. (Note: Attributed to multiple references:)

== Career ==
=== 2001–2004: Early roles and breakthrough ===
In 2001, Hathaway starred in the Disney comedy The Princess Diaries, based on Meg Cabot's novel The Princess Diaries. She portrayed the teenager Mia Thermopolis, who discovers that she is the heiress to the throne of the fictional Kingdom of Genovia. Hathaway auditioned for the role during a flight layover on the way to New Zealand. Director Garry Marshall initially considered Liv Tyler for the role, but cast Hathaway after his granddaughters suggested that she had the best "princess" hair. The film received mixed reviews from critics but became a major commercial success, grossing $165 million worldwide. Ben Falk of the BBC praised Hathaway's chemistry with her co-star Julie Andrews, while Elvis Mitchell of The New York Times lauded her comic talent and called her "royalty in the making". For her performance, Hathaway was nominated for the MTV Movie Award for Best Breakthrough Female Performance. The same year, she starred with Christopher Gorham in Mitch Davis's adventure drama The Other Side of Heaven, which was also distributed by Disney. Inspired by John H. Groberg's memoir In the Eye of the Storm, the film met with mostly negative reviews and was a box-office failure.

In terms of the princess role, there is only so long that you can play those as a young lady before you start feeling really ridiculous. They are so much fun to do, I figure I might as well get the most out of them while I can. Then [I'll] go off and play all the drug addicts and the prostitutes, and all the good ones you win Oscars for a little bit later on.

— Hathaway, 2004

Due to the success of The Princess Diaries, People magazine named Hathaway one of its breakthrough stars of 2001. In 2002, Hathaway starred in the City Center Encores! concert production of Carnival! in her New York City stage debut. She played Lili, an optimistic orphan who falls in love with a magician. She memorized almost all her lines and songs at the first read-through. Critics generally praised her for holding her own against well-known actors and heralded her as a new star. In a review of the musical, Charles Isherwood of Variety praised Hathaway's convincing performance, calling her the highlight of the show and "remarkably unaffected and winning". Hathaway won a Clarence Derwent Award for Most Promising Female. Later, she voiced the audiobook release of the first three books in The Princess Diaries novel series.

Over the next three years, Hathaway portrayed princesses and appeared in family-oriented films, subsequently becoming known in mainstream media as a children's role model. After voicing Haru Yoshioka for the English version of The Cat Returns (2002), she starred in Douglas McGrath's comedy-drama Nicholas Nickleby (2002), which opened to generally positive reviews. However, the film did not enter wide release and failed at the North American box office, grossing less than $4 million in ticket sales. Hathaway next starred as Ella in the fantasy romantic comedy Ella Enchanted (2004), which was based on the novel Ella Enchanted. Hathaway had read the book when she was 16, and said the initial version of the script was much closer to the source material but did not work as a film. Ella Enchanted opened to mixed reviews and performed poorly at the box office, although many critics found Hathaway "charming" in her role, according to the review aggregator Rotten Tomatoes. (Note: Attributed to multiple references:) Hathaway sang three songs on the film's soundtrack, including a duet with singer Jesse McCartney.

In 2003, Hathaway turned down the role of Christine Daaé in Joel Schumacher's The Phantom of the Opera (2004), because the production schedule of the film overlapped with that of The Princess Diaries 2: Royal Engagement (2004). When Hathaway expressed hesitation about starring in the Princess Diaries sequel, director Gary Marshall encouraged her by saying that the film would bring happiness to young girls around the world. The film earned mostly negative reviews but grossed $134.7 million against a $45 million budget.

=== 2005–2008: Rise to prominence ===
Hathaway began taking on more mature roles to avoid typecasting. She also said she needed a reprieve from being a role model for children. After replacing Tara Strong for the voice role of Red Puckett in Hoodwinked!, she starred in the drama Havoc (2005) as a spoiled socialite, appearing partially nude in some scenes. Hathaway denied that taking the role was an overt attempt to be seen as a more mature actress. The film was not released in theaters in the United States due to unfavorable critical reception.

In the 2005 drama Brokeback Mountain, which depicts the emotional and sexual relationship between two men, Ennis Del Mar (Heath Ledger) and Jack Twist (Jake Gyllenhaal), Hathaway played Lureen, the wife of Jack. She had been sent the script with the part of Ennis' wife in mind, but decided to audition for Lureen instead. She lied during the audition about her knowledge of horseback riding so that director Ang Lee would cast her, but she did subsequently take lessons. The film received critical acclaim and several Academy Award nominations. Peter Travers of Rolling Stone wrote that Hathaway "excels at showing Lureen's journey from cutie-pie to hard case", while Todd McCarthy of Variety credited her for providing "an entertaining contrast in wifely disappointment". Hathaway stated that the content of Brokeback Mountain was more important than its award count, and that making the film made her more aware of the kind of stories she wanted to tell as an actor. At this point, she realized she wanted to play roles that would move audiences or entertain them so thoroughly that they would forget about their own lives.

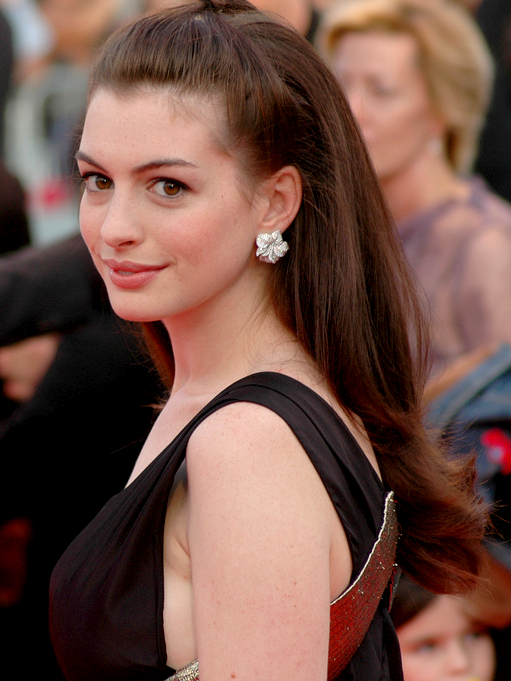
Hathaway at the 2007 Deauville American Film Festival

Hathaway starred in The Devil Wears Prada (2006), based on Lauren Weisberger's 2003 novel. Her character is a recent college graduate who becomes an assistant to a powerful fashion magazine editor (Meryl Streep). Hathaway said she was "the ninth choice" for the role, which she prepared for by volunteering as an assistant at an auction house. She also followed a weight-loss regimen which led to crying breakdowns. She stated that working on the film made her respect the fashion industry a great deal more than she did previously. The Devil Wears Prada received generally positive reviews; Roger Ebert said Hathaway "makes a convincing career girl" while the critical consensus on Rotten Tomatoes found "Streep in top form and Anne Hathaway more than holding her own". The film became Hathaway's most popular film at the time, with a worldwide gross of over $326.5 million.

Hathaway was cast as the female lead in the comedy Knocked Up (2007), but dropped out because she did not agree with director Judd Apatow's decision to use real footage of a woman giving birth, according to Apatow and the film's male star Seth Rogen. (Note: Attributed to multiple references:) In 2007, Hathaway portrayed the English author Jane Austen in the biographical romantic drama Becoming Jane. A fan of Austen since the age of 14, Hathaway prepared for the role by learning sign language, calligraphy, dance choreography and piano, and by examining Austen's letters. She moved to England a month before filming to improve her English accent. She believed that if she did not perfect her accent, people would dismiss her performance in the first five minutes of the film. She was nominated for a British Independent Film Award for Best Actress for the film.

In 2008, Hathaway starred as Agent 99 in Peter Segal's film adaptation of Mel Brooks' television series Get Smart. Calling the role "a childhood dream come true", Hathaway learned martial arts and dancing techniques in preparation for her performance. While filming an action sequence, she suffered a shin injury that required 15 stitches. Get Smart was a box office success. The same year, Hathaway starred in Jonathan Demme's drama Rachel Getting Married (2008) as a young woman who returns home for her sister's wedding after being released from drug rehabilitation. Hathaway described her character as narcissistic, and earned critical acclaim for her performance. Peter Travers of Rolling Stone described her as "raw and riveting" in the role, writing that she "acts the hell out of it, achieving a state of sorrowful grace". Hathaway received Academy Award, Golden Globe Award, Critics' Choice, and SAG nominations for Best Actress, winning the Critics' Choice award. The same year, she starred in the mystery thriller Passengers and hosted an episode of the sketch comedy television show Saturday Night Live.

=== 2009–2011: Romantic comedies and hosting events ===
In 2009, Hathaway was invited to join the Academy of Motion Picture Arts and Sciences. The same year, she starred in the romantic comedy Bride Wars, which she described as "hideously commercial—gloriously so". The film, in which she and Kate Hudson play best friends who become rivals after their weddings are scheduled on the same day, was a critical failure but was successful at the box office, and earned Hathaway a nomination for the MTV Movie Award for Best Female Performance. During the summer of 2010, Hathaway played the heroine Viola in a production of Shakespeare's Twelfth Night at the Delacorte Theater in New York City. For her portrayal of the role, she was nominated for the Drama Desk Award for Outstanding Actress in a Play. In 2010, she won a Primetime Emmy Award for Outstanding Voice-Over Performance for providing her voice for the episode "Once Upon a Time in Springfield" of The Simpsons. Hathaway voiced characters in Family Guy in 2010 and 2011.

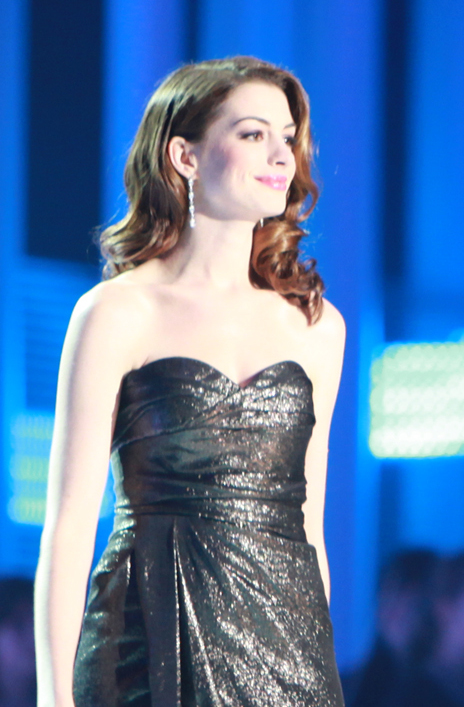
Hathaway at the Nobel Peace Prize Concert in 2010, which she hosted with actor Denzel Washington

In 2010, Hathaway played a receptionist who dates a clerk (played by Topher Grace) in the romantic comedy Valentine's Day, directed by Garry Marshall. The film was a commercial success, grossing more than $215 million worldwide against a budget of $52 million. The same year, Hathaway played the White Queen in Tim Burton's Alice in Wonderland alongside Helena Bonham Carter and Johnny Depp. She drew inspiration from Debbie Harry and the artwork of Dan Flavin for her version of the character, which she described as "a punk-rock vegan pacifist". Alice in Wonderland received mixed reviews from critics but grossed $1 billion at the box office, becoming the second-highest-grossing film of 2010.

Hathaway reunited with her Brokeback Mountain co-star Jake Gyllenhaal for Edward Zwick's romantic comedy-drama Love & Other Drugs (2010), which was based on the nonfiction book Hard Sell: The Evolution of a Viagra Salesman by Jamie Reidy. Hathaway's character is a free-spirited artist with Parkinson's disease. To prepare for the film's nude scenes, Hathaway watched films featuring Kate Winslet and Penélope Cruz, both of whom she felt had performed nude scenes with sensitivity and dignity. Critics generally praised the film's mature depiction of romance, but were unenthusiastic about its plot. Hathaway's performance, which the critic Roger Ebert called "warm" and "lovable", earned her a Satellite Award and a nomination for the Golden Globe Award for Best Actress – Comedy or Musical.

In December 2010, Hathaway and Denzel Washington attended the 2010 Nobel Peace Prize ceremony in Oslo, which honored the imprisoned Chinese writer and human rights activist Liu Xiaobo. The following day, they co-hosted the Nobel Peace Prize Concert. Two months later, Hathaway and James Franco hosted the 83rd Academy Awards. Although critics were unenthusiastic about their chemistry, the pair were nominated for Outstanding Variety Special (Live) at the 63rd Primetime Emmy Awards.

In 2011, Hathaway voiced Jewel, a Spix's macaw from Rio de Janeiro, in the animated film Rio. The film received generally positive reviews from critics, who praised its voice acting. A commercial success, it grossed more than $484 million worldwide against a budget of $90 million. Later that year, Hathaway starred alongside Jim Sturgess in Lone Scherfig's One Day, based on the 2009 novel by David Nicholls. The film tells the story of two young people who meet annually for twenty years after sharing a platonic one-night stand. Hathaway was given the script clandestinely, as One Day was set in Britain, and Scherfig was not looking for an American actress for the lead role. After an unproductive meeting with Scherfig, Hathaway left a list of songs for her. After listening to them, she cast Hathaway. Hathaway later expressed regret that she may have unwittingly held a misogynistic attitude towards Scherfig and not trusted her fully because of her gender. Hathaway's Yorkshire accent in the film received criticism, with Suzanne Moore of BBC Radio 4's Front Row saying that it was "all over the shop ... Sometimes she's from Scotland, sometimes she's from New York, you just can't tell". One Day received mixed reviews, but became a moderate box office success. (Note: Attributed to multiple references:)

=== 2012–2014: Les Miserables and Christopher Nolan films ===
In 2012, Hathaway's audiobook recording of L. Frank Baum's 1900 novel The Wonderful Wizard of Oz was released at Audible.com and garnered her an Audie Award nomination for Best Solo Narration – Female. She then played the morally ambiguous cat burglar Selina Kyle / Catwoman in The Dark Knight Rises, the final film in Christopher Nolan's The Dark Knight trilogy. Hathaway thought she was auditioning for the role of Harley Quinn; after an hour of talking with Nolan, he revealed that he was considering her for Catwoman. Hathaway had to redouble her efforts at the gym to meet the requirements of the role, which she described as her most physically demanding assignment up to that point. She trained extensively in martial arts, and looked to Hedy Lamarr in developing her performance as Catwoman. Jim Vejvoda of IGN called Hathaway "a magnetic presence" who imbues her character with "a wounded spirit and a survivor's edge that makes her feel genuine and sympathetic even when she's being naughty." Hathaway won the Saturn Award for Best Supporting Actress for her performance. The Dark Knight Rises was well-received by critics and grossed more than $1 billion worldwide, becoming the third-highest-grossing film of 2012.

Hathaway portrayed Fantine, a prostitute dying of tuberculosis, in Tom Hooper's Les Misérables (2012), a film adaptation of the stage musical Les Misérables. In preparation for the role, Hathaway consumed fewer than 500 calories a day in order to lose 25 pounds (11 kg). As part of her effort to inhabit Fantine's misery, Hathaway deprived herself of her husband, sending him back to the United States while she was filming in London. Reviewing the film for The Washington Post, Ann Hornaday called Hathaway "the centerpiece of a movie composed entirely of centerpieces". Although Hathaway herself felt lukewarm about her performance, she won the Academy Award, Golden Globe Award, Screen Actors Guild Award and BAFTA Award for Best Supporting Actress. In January 2013, Hathaway's rendition of "I Dreamed a Dream" reached number 69 on the Billboard Hot 100.

After briefly appearing in the romantic comedy Don Jon (2013), Hathaway starred in and co-produced (with her husband and others) the drama film Song One. She plays a student who begins a romantic relationship with her brother's favorite musician. Her character was originally written as a 19-year-old, but Kate Barker-Froyland, the film's writer and director, changed the character to an older woman after casting Hathaway. Hathaway said she decided to produce the film because of its depiction of the healing power of music and second chances. For the film's soundtrack, she provided her voice for the song "Afraid of Heights". Song One premiered in the U.S. Dramatic Competition at the 30th Sundance Film Festival in January 2014. It was released in theaters the following year to mixed reviews from critics, and failed to recoup its $6 million budget.

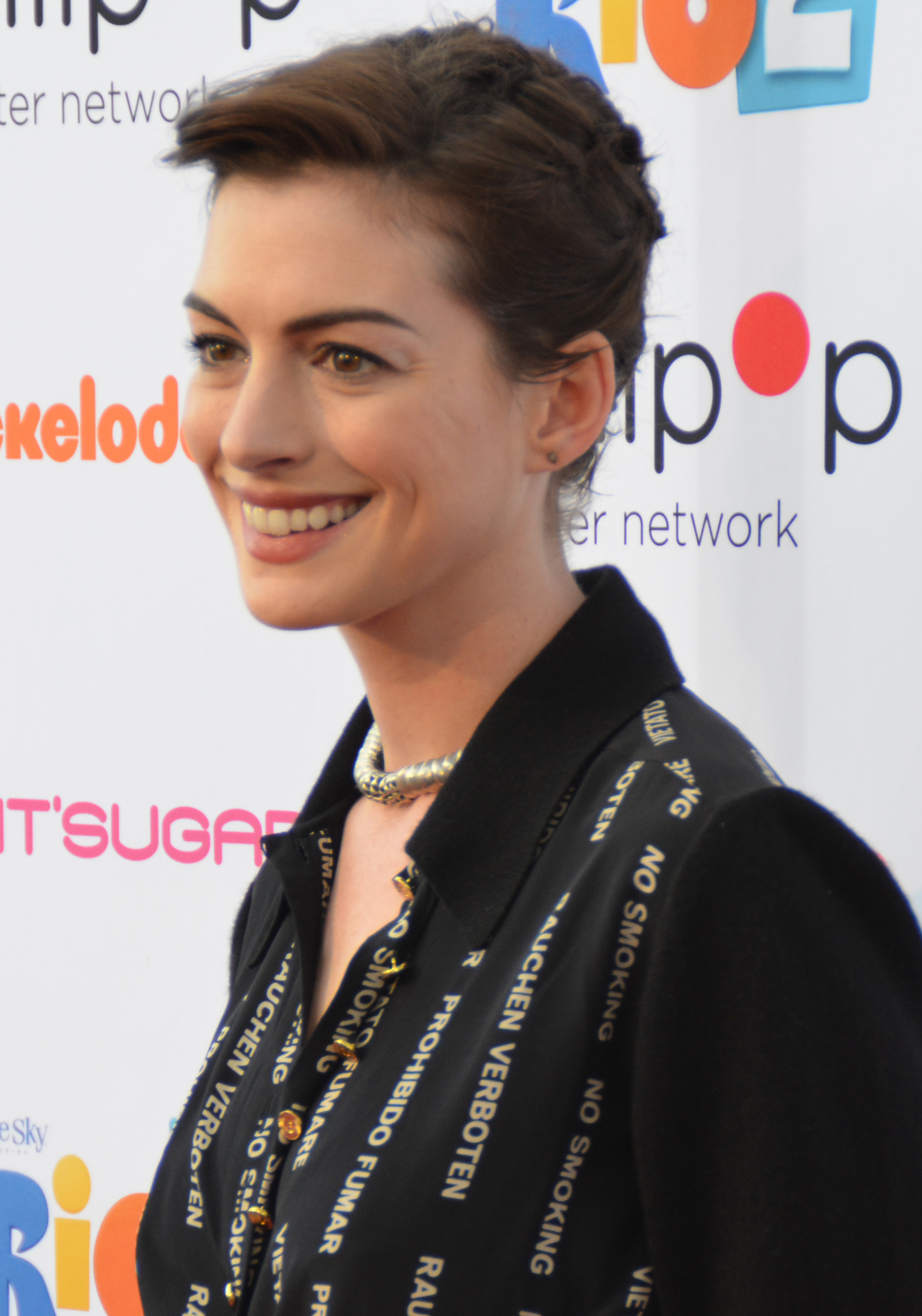
Hathaway at a screening of Rio 2 in 2014

Hathaway reprised her role as Jewel in the animated film Rio 2 (2014), her third film with Jamie Foxx. It grossed nearly five times more than its $103 million budget. Hathaway's sole live-action release of 2014 was Nolan's science fiction film Interstellar, which follows a crew of astronauts who travel through a wormhole in search of a new home for mankind. She was drawn to the part of NASA scientist Amelia Brand due to the character's growth from an arrogant person to a humbler one. Hathaway nearly experienced hypothermia while filming a water scene in Iceland, as the dry suit she was wearing had not been properly secured. Geoffrey Macnab of The Independent described Hathaway as "affecting" in her role, while James Dyer of Empire found "soulful nuance" in her performance. Interstellar grossed over $701 million worldwide against a budget of $165 million, and earned Hathaway a nomination for the Saturn Award for Best Actress.

=== 2015–2021: Mixed success ===
Hathaway began 2015 with an appearance in the first season of the musical reality show Lip Sync Battle. In the episode, she competed against her The Devil Wears Prada co-star Emily Blunt; she lip synced "Love" by Mary J. Blige and "Wrecking Ball" by Miley Cyrus. Nancy Meyers' The Intern was Hathaway's sole film release of 2015. It tells the story of Ben Whittaker (played by Robert De Niro), a 70-year-old widower who becomes a senior intern at an online fashion site run by Jules Ostin (Hathaway). Hathaway had aspired to work with De Niro and Meyers, her favorite actor and director, respectively; impressed with the film's story, she auditioned for the third time for a Meyers film. (Note: Hathaway had auditioned for Meyers' films What Women Want (2000) and The Holiday (2006).) The Intern received mixed reviews. Glenn Kenny of RogerEbert.com called Hathaway "extremely appealing" in her role, while Bilge Ebiri of New York magazine said the film "gets off on De Niro's amiability and Hathaway's sweet energy". The Intern grossed $194 million worldwide against a $35 million budget.

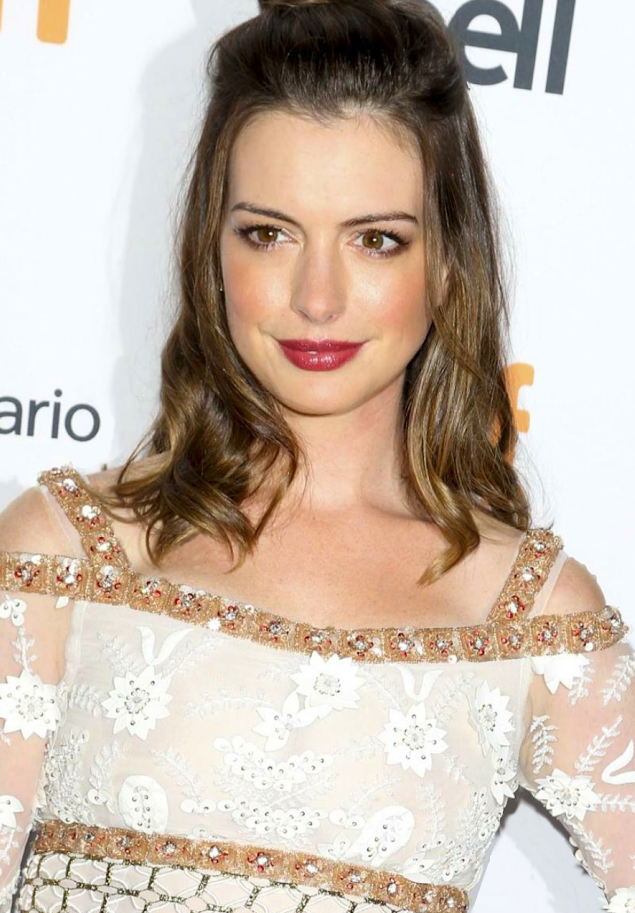
Hathaway at the 2016 Toronto International Film Festival

Hathaway reprised the role of the White Queen in Alice Through the Looking Glass, the 2016 sequel to Alice in Wonderland. That March, it was reported that she would reprise her role for The Princess Diaries 3; the project was cancelled after the death of Garry Marshall, who was set to direct. Hathaway is one of several actors featured on Barbra Streisand's 2016 album Encore: Movie Partners Sing Broadway. Along with Daisy Ridley, Hathaway and Streisand performed the song "At the Ballet" from A Chorus Line; Hathaway played the role of Maggie, one of a trio of dancers hoping to be cast in an upcoming show. Her final film that year was alongside Jason Sudeikis in Nacho Vigalondo's science fiction black comedy Colossal (2016). Playing an unemployed young writer, Hathaway was the first actress to sign on at a time when the project had no financial backing. She was drawn to the genre-hopping nature of the script, later comparing it to Being John Malkovich (1999), one of her favorite films. Colossal received positive reviews from critics and earned $4 million at the box office.

After a two-year absence from the screen, Hathaway starred as a famous actress in Ocean's 8 (2018), a spin-off film of the Ocean's Eleven franchise featuring an all-female ensemble cast. Co-starring Sandra Bullock and Cate Blanchett, it follows a group of criminals who plan to rob the Met Gala. Hathaway was drawn to the idea of playing someone with an immense ego and saw the role as an opportunity "to lean into all the ridiculous fame nonsense" that she tried to avoid in her everyday life. She hoped the film would be profitable so that it could debunk claims that female-led films do not succeed commercially. Several critics considered Hathaway a "scene stealer" among the cast. Jason Di Rosso of ABC Online said the film's best moments "belong to Hathaway as the anxiety-ridden, vain and capricious starlet. She is regarded as a successful combination of comedy and pathos, portraying a celebrity affected by the pressures of fame while also demonstrating the ability to navigate and outsmart them." Ocean's 8 was a box office success, grossing over $297 million worldwide against a $70 million budget.

Hathaway's first two films of 2019, the thriller Serenity and the comedy The Hustle, were poorly received by critics. In Serenity, she starred alongside her Interstellar co-star Matthew McConaughey as a woman who asks her ex-husband to kill her current abusive husband. Michael O’Sullivan of The Washington Post described her performance as "cartoonish", adding that her femme fatale character was reminiscent of Jessica Rabbit from Who Framed Roger Rabbit. Hathaway starred alongside Rebel Wilson in The Hustle, a remake of Dirty Rotten Scoundrels (1988). The Hustle emerged as a sleeper hit. Hathaway next played a woman with bipolar disorder in an episode of the Amazon Prime Video romantic anthology series Modern Love. She then played the wife of Mark Ruffalo's character in Todd Haynes' legal drama film Dark Waters, about environmental poisoning committed by the chemical company DuPont. Writing for Variety, Owen Gleiberman called her supporting performance "a piercing dance of agony and loyalty". In 2019, Hathaway received a motion pictures star on the Hollywood Walk of Fame for her contributions to the film industry.

In 2020, Hathaway was inducted into the New Jersey Hall of Fame. Her first role of the new decade was in the political thriller The Last Thing He Wanted (2020), based on the 1996 novel by Joan Didion. Hathaway considered herself to be an unlikely choice for the role of a headstrong journalist, as it differed from her own "puppy dog" personality. The film received negative reviews from critics. Hathaway then starred as an evil witch in The Witches, an adaptation of the 1983 children's novel by Roald Dahl. The film received mixed reviews. Hathaway's performances in both films earned her nominations for Worst Actress at the 41st Golden Raspberry Awards. In 2021, she starred with Chiwetel Ejiofor in the heist film Locked Down, directed by Doug Liman, which premiered on HBO Max. Set during the COVID-19 pandemic, it was shot over the course of 18 days with limited resources. (Note: Attributed to multiple references:) Hathaway next appeared in one episode of the Amazon Prime Video anthology series Solos.

=== 2022–present: Mainstream resurgence ===
Hathaway executive produced and starred opposite Jared Leto in the Apple TV+ miniseries WeCrashed (2022), about the company WeWork. It received generally favorable reviews, with particular praise for Hathaway's portrayal of Rebekah Neumann. Angie Han of The Hollywood Reporter commended her for resisting "the temptation to turn Rebekah into an exaggerated caricature of an entitled woo-woo type". The same year, Hathaway starred in James Gray's semi-autobiographical period drama Armageddon Time, portraying a character inspired by Gray's mother. David Rooney of The Hollywood Reporter considered it to be her best performance since Rachel Getting Married, while Owen Gleiberman of Variety praised her for making her character "at once affectionate and blinkered".

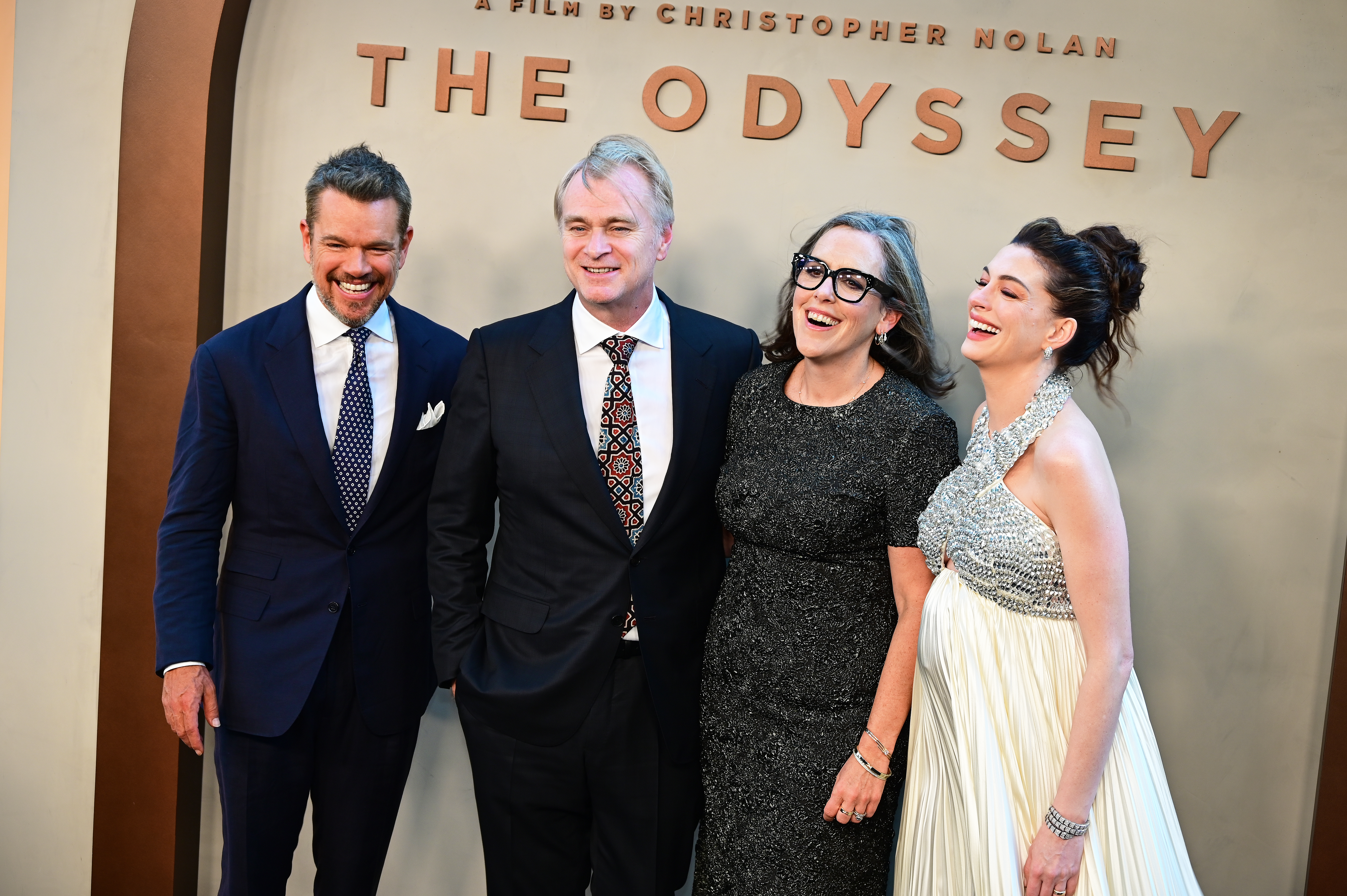
Left to right: Matt Damon, Christopher Nolan, Emma Thomas and Hathaway at the premiere of The Odyssey in New York City

In her two film releases of 2023, Eileen and She Came to Me, Hathaway played emotionally troubled psychiatrists. Eileen, based on Ottessa Moshfegh's 2015 thriller novel, stars Thomasin McKenzie in the title role and premiered at the 2023 Sundance Film Festival. Hathaway described the film as "Carol meets Reservoir Dogs". Ryan Lattanzio of IndieWire felt Hathaway's role was "tailor-made" for her, and thought her performance was the best of her career. At the 2023 Berlin International Film Festival, Rebecca Miller's romantic comedy She Came to Me was released.

Hathaway's first role of 2024 was a grieving mother coping with the loss of her son in the thriller Mothers' Instinct, which is a remake of the 2018 Belgian film. Because the loss of a child was her worst fear, Hathaway created a "protective layer" between herself and her character, which included asking the cast and crew to call her by her character's name. Writing for The Guardian, Peter Bradshaw thought her performance was overshadowed by that of her co-star Jessica Chastain. Hathaway next starred in the romantic comedy The Idea of You, based on Robinne Lee's novel The Idea of You, playing a divorced mother who begins a romance with a younger pop star. Alissa Wilkinson of The New York Times thought the film "succeeds mostly because of Hathaway's performance", and praised her chemistry with co-star Nicholas Galitzine.

Hathaway appeared in five films in 2026. Her first was David Lowery's Mother Mary, in which she played a pop star whose reunion with her former costume designer (played by Michaela Coel) forces her to confront her past. The film received mixed reviews. Hathaway next reprised the role of Andrea "Andy" Sachs in The Devil Wears Prada 2. She and her co-stars Meryl Streep and Emily Blunt each earned a $12.5 million upfront salary for the sequel, with back-end bonuses that could push their total pay past $20 million. The film received generally positive reviews, with David Rooney of The Hollywood Reporter calling Hathaway "effortlessly charming in the role". The Devil Wears Prada 2 and Hathaway's next release—The Odyssey, her third film with Christopher Nolan—were among the highest-grossing films of 2026. In The Odyssey, she played Penelope, the Greek queen of Ithaca, who awaits the return of her husband Odysseus (Matt Damon) after the Trojan War. Marlow Stern of Variety described Hathaway's performance as a powerful and gritty portrayal characterized by strength and determination. Hathaway's fourth film of the year was David Robert Mitchell's science fiction film The End of Oak Street, which she starred in alongside Ewan McGregor. Hathaway's final film of 2026 is Verity, based on Colleen Hoover's 2018 novel. Hathaway stars in the film as a best-selling author.

==== Upcoming projects ====
Hathaway will star alongside Tom Cruise in Days of Thunder 2. She will be reprising the role of Mia Thermopolis in a third installment of The Princess Diaries series, directed by Adele Lim.

== Public image ==
Laura Brown of Harper's Bazaar has described Hathaway as sincere, warm and funny, while John Hiscock of The Daily Telegraph has called her "well-grounded" and friendly, with a good sense of humor and an easy-going attitude. Nancy Meyers, who directed Hathaway in The Intern, referred to her as "wise beyond her years", while the book 365 Style described her as having a girl next door image. In 2008, Hathaway commented on her perceived image: "People have this idea of me as just being a very prim, professional girl, which I suppose I am, but I do cut loose and have fun in my life." On another occasion, Hathaway said the public perceives her as a sweet and uninteresting "good girl" with no grit or sex appeal. (Note: Attributed to multiple references:) The magazines Empire, Entertainment Weekly, FHM, Los Angeles Times Magazine, Maxim, and People have included Hathaway on their lists of the most attractive celebrities, and she was featured on the cover of People magazine's annual "World's Most Beautiful" issue in 2026. Hathaway has promoted the fashion company Tod's and the cosmetics brand Lancôme. (Note: Attributed to multiple references:)

After her breakthrough role in The Princess Diaries, Hathaway said she struggled to find non-princess roles that were serious. According to Jodi Guglielmi of People, Hathaway's fear of being typecast motivated her to build a versatile body of work, and her practice of extensively researching her roles has been key to her success. In a 2008 article for The Daily Telegraph, Catherine Elsworth described Hathaway as "the hottest young actress in Hollywood" who was viewed as the next Julia Roberts. In 2011, another Daily Telegraph writer praised Hathaway's willingness to appear in various genres of films, and in 2009 the theater critic Charles Isherwood described her as a "natural star". (Note: Attributed to multiple references:) Writing for Esquire in 2018, Justin Kirkland felt that many of Hathaway's strong performances had been overlooked, and described her career as "subtle brilliance that has largely gone unnoticed".

In 2013, after Hathaway made acceptance speeches for awards she won for Les Misérables, she received widespread criticism in the press and on social media for her demeanor, with some critics describing her as "annoying" and calling her jokes "awkward". Hathaway later explained that she feels anxious when speaking in public. She said the criticism helped her grow and become a more compassionate person.

Forbes included Hathaway on its annual Celebrity 100 list in 2009, and ranked her as one of the world's highest-paid actresses in 2015. In 2017, Digital Spy named her as one of the 50 highest-grossing actors of the 21st century. As of 2018, Hathaway's films have grossed $6.7 billion worldwide.

== Advocacy ==
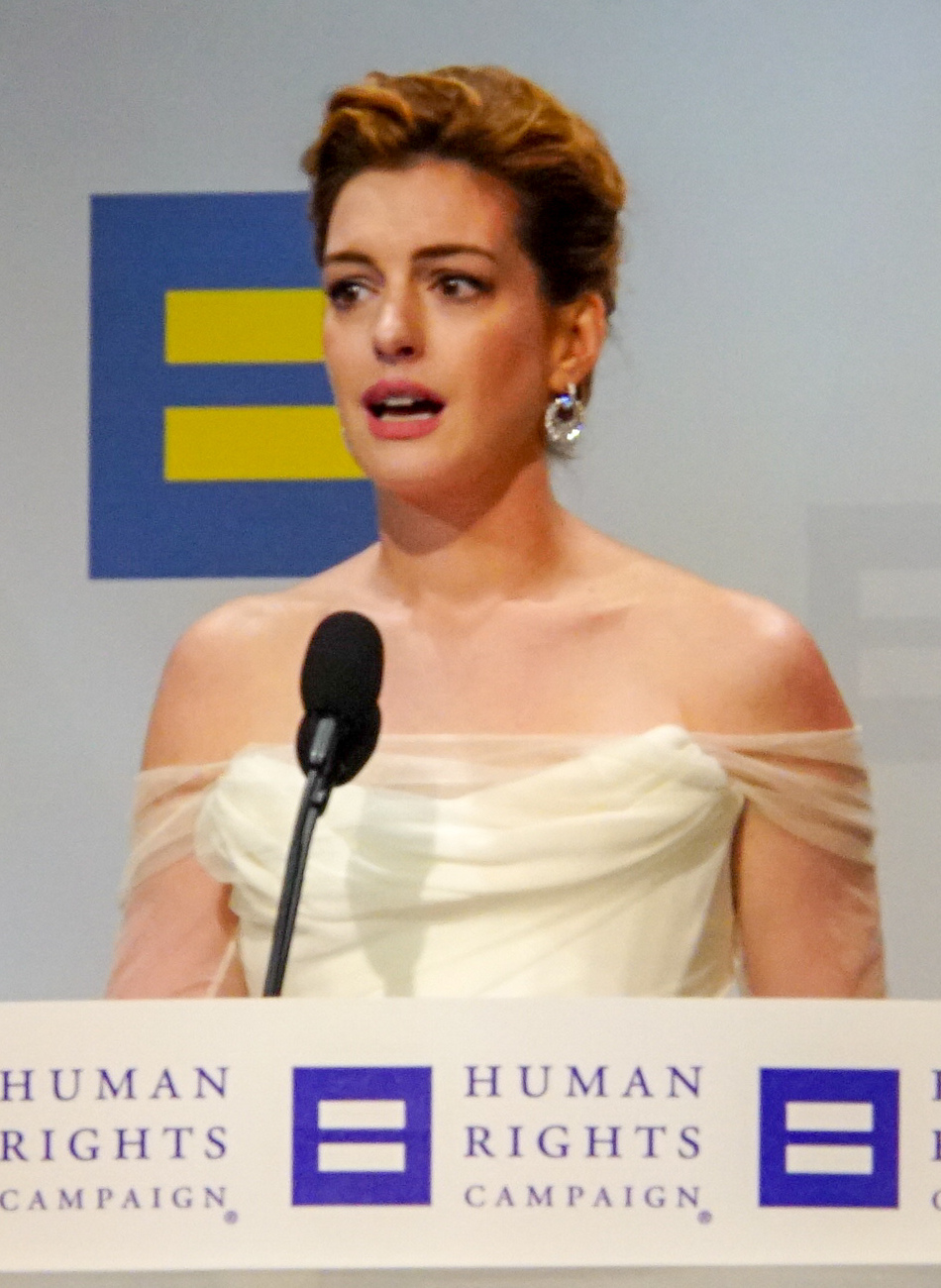
Hathaway at the 2018 Human Rights Campaign dinner in Washington, D.C.

In 2008, Hathaway won an award from the Human Rights Campaign for her philanthropy. The same year, she was honored at Elle's Women in Hollywood tribute and was honored for her work with Step Up Women's Network. (Note: Attributed to multiple references:) In 2010, she began working with the World Bank on a two-year development program called The Girl Effect, with the mission of empowering girls around the world. In 2013, she narrated Girl Rising, a CNN documentary film about the power of women's education. Hathaway was appointed as a UN Women Goodwill Ambassador in 2016, with the stated goal of addressing the unequal burden shouldered by women who care for children. She has also worked with the Nike Foundation to raise awareness about child marriage, helped vaccinate children against hepatitis A in Nicaragua, and promoted the rights of women and girls in Kenya and Ethiopia.

Hathaway serves on the board of the Lollipop Theater Network, which brings entertainment to children in hospitals. She has been involved with the charities Creative Coalition, Human Rights Campaign, and St. Jude Children's Research Hospital. In 2017, she spoke on International Women's Day in favor of paid parental leave for both men and women. In 2018, she collaborated with 300 women in Hollywood to launch the Time's Up initiative, which aims to protect women from harassment and discrimination. Hathaway has criticized inequality in the U.S. film industry and has advocated for more professional opportunities for women in the industry.

In response to the 2022 Russian invasion of Ukraine, Hathaway made donations to the Ukrainian Red Cross Society, UNICEF and Save the Children to help Ukrainians affected by the war. She praised the Berlin International Film Festival in 2023 for featuring Ukrainian president Volodymyr Zelenskyy, who gave a televised speech during the opening ceremony.

== Personal life ==
=== Relationships ===
Hathaway dated the Italian real estate developer Raffaello Follieri from 2004 to 2008. Follieri was investigated by the Internal Revenue Service in 2008 for failure to file required non-profit information forms. He was arrested on charges of defrauding investors, including former U.S. president Bill Clinton, out of millions of dollars. The FBI confiscated Hathaway's private journals from Follieri's New York City apartment as part of its investigation into his activities. After pleading guilty, Follieri was sentenced to four and a half years in prison.

Hathaway married the actor and businessman Adam Shulman in Big Sur, California on September 29, 2012. The couple sold their wedding photograph and donated the proceeds to the same-sex marriage advocacy organization Freedom to Marry. They later hosted the organization's National Engagement Party fundraiser, which raised $500,000. Hathaway and Shulman own several properties, including a chalet in Southern California, which serves as their primary residence, and a penthouse on the Upper West Side of New York City. Hathaway experienced a miscarriage in 2015. The couple have two sons, born in 2016 and 2019. In June 2026, Hathaway announced that she was pregnant with their third child.

=== Political views ===
Hathaway has supported various Democratic candidates during U.S. presidential elections, including Barack Obama (2008, 2012), Hillary Clinton (2016), Joe Biden (2020), and Kamala Harris (2024). She attended the 2008 Democratic National Convention, and appeared at a benefit concert for the Hillary Clinton campaign in New York City in 2012.

Hathaway supports abortion rights, immigrant rights and gun control, (Note: Attributed to multiple references:) and has criticized U.S. president Donald Trump for his anti-immigration policies. She is a supporter of LGBT rights, and has donated money to organizations which support the legalization of same-sex marriage. She has spoken out on homophobia, school bullying, transphobia and white privilege.

=== Health ===
In 2007, Hathaway discussed experiencing depression during her teenage years, stating that she eventually overcame it without medication. In 2008, she began smoking after a stressful summer and the end of her relationship with Follieri. She eventually quit smoking, and in 2018 she quit drinking alcohol. She has been vegetarian and vegan at various points in her life. (Note: Attributed to multiple references:)
