= List of awards and nominations received by Anne Hathaway =

Anne Hathaway awards and nominations
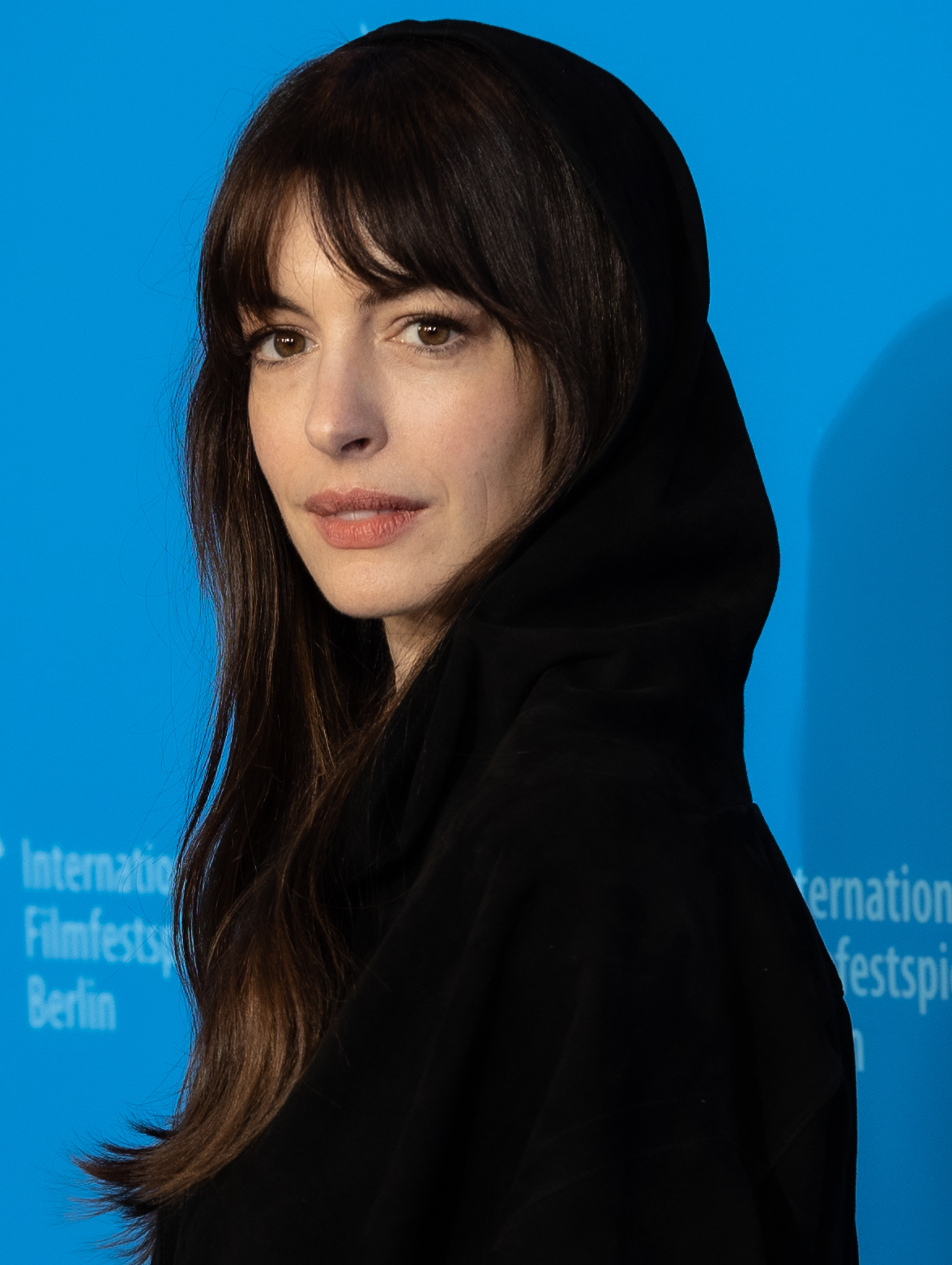
- Hathaway in 2023
Awards and nominations
Award	Wins	Nominations
Academy Awards	1	2
Actor Awards	1	4
BAFTA Awards	1	1
Critics' Choice Awards	2	6
Emmy Awards	1	2
Golden Globes	1	3

Totals (Note: Certain award groups do not simply award one winner. They acknowledge several different recipients, have runners-up, and have third place. Since this is a specific recognition and is different from losing an award, runner-up mentions are considered wins in this award tally. For simplification and to avoid errors, each award in this list has been presumed to have had a prior nomination.)
- Wins: 46
- Nominations: 110

The following is a list of awards and nominations received by American actress Anne Hathaway. She is known for her leading roles across various genres in film, television, and theatre. She has received various accolades including an Academy Award, a British Academy Film Award, two Critics' Choice Movie Awards, a Primetime Emmy Award, a Golden Globe Award, and a Screen Actors Guild Award.

Her career began with a leading role in the television series Get Real (1999–2000), which garnered her a Teen Choice Award nomination for Choice TV Actress. Her film debut came with the leading role of Mia Thermopolis in the Disney comedy The Princess Diaries (2001), for which she was nominated for an MTV Movie Award for Best Breakthrough Performance. She made a transition to adult roles with the 2005 dramas Havoc and Brokeback Mountain, the latter of which was nominated for a Screen Actors Guild Award. She gained nominations for a Teen Choice Award and a British Independent Film Award for the comedy-drama The Devil Wears Prada (2006) and the biopic Becoming Jane (2007), respectively.

In 2008, Hathaway played a recovering drug addict in Rachel Getting Married, for which she received nominations for an Academy Award and a Golden Globe Award for Best Actress. Her leading roles in the romances Bride Wars (2009) and Love & Other Drugs (2010) garnered her nominations for two MTV Movie & TV Awards and a Golden Globe, respectively. She played Catwoman in Christopher Nolan's superhero film The Dark Knight Rises (2012), for which she won a Saturn Award for Best Supporting Actress. She portrayed Fantine in the musical Les Misérables (2012) earning several accolades including the Academy Award, a Golden Globe and a BAFTA Award for Best Supporting Actress.

Hathaway played a NASA scientist in the science fiction film Interstellar (2014), for which she was nominated for a Saturn Award for Best Actress. Hathaway then starred in the commercially successful comedies The Intern (2015) and Ocean's 8 (2018), for both of which she earned nominations for People's Choice Awards. In 2019, Hathaway received a star on the Hollywood Walk of Fame for her contributions to the motion picture industry. Her role in the film The Witches (2020) earned her a nomination for a Nickelodeon Kids' Choice Award.

On television, she won a Primetime Emmy Award for Outstanding Voice-Over Performance for providing her voice for an episode on The Simpsons in 2010. She played woman with bipolar disorder in an episode of the Amazon Prime Video anthology series Modern Love (2019), earning a Critics' Choice Television Award nomination. She played Rebekah Neumann in the Apple TV+ miniseries WeCrashed (2022) earning a nomination for a Hollywood Critics Association TV Award. On stage, she played Viola in Shakespeare in the Park production of Twelfth Night (2009) earning a nomination for the Drama Desk Award for Outstanding Actress in a Play. For playing a pilot in the Julie Taymor play Grounded (2015) at The Public Theater she was nominated for a Drama League Award for Outstanding Solo Performance.

== Major associations ==
=== Academy Awards ===
Year	Category	Nominated work	Result	Ref.
2009	Best Actress	Rachel Getting Married	Nominated	
2013	Best Supporting Actress	Les Misérables	Won	

=== Actor Awards ===
Year	Category	Nominated work	Result	Ref.
2006	Outstanding Cast in a Motion Picture	Brokeback Mountain	Nominated (Note: Shared with the cast.)	
2009	Outstanding Actress in a Leading Role	Rachel Getting Married	Nominated	
2013	Outstanding Actress in a Supporting Role	Les Misérables	Won	
2013	Outstanding Cast in a Motion Picture	Les Misérables	Nominated	

=== BAFTA Awards ===
Year	Category	Nominated work	Result	Ref.
British Academy Film Awards
2013	Best Actress in a Supporting Role	Les Misérables	Won	

=== Critics' Choice Awards ===
Year	Category	Nominated work	Result	Ref.
Critics' Choice Movie Awards
2009	Best Actress	Rachel Getting Married	Won (Note: Tied with Meryl Streep)	
2009	Best Acting Ensemble	Rachel Getting Married	Nominated	
2013	Best Acting Ensemble	Les Misérables	Nominated	
2013	Best Supporting Actress	Les Misérables	Won	
2013	Best Actress in an Action Movie	The Dark Knight Rises	Nominated	
Critics' Choice Television Awards
2020	Best Actress in a Movie/Miniseries	Modern Love	Nominated	

=== Emmy Awards ===
Year	Category	Nominated work	Result	Ref.
Primetime Emmy Awards
2010	Outstanding Voice-Over Performance	The Simpsons (episode: "Once Upon a Time in Springfield")	Won	
2011	Outstanding Variety Special (Live)	83rd Academy Awards	Nominated	

=== Golden Globe Awards ===
Year	Category	Nominated work	Result	Ref.
2009	Best Actress in a Motion Picture – Drama	Rachel Getting Married	Nominated	
2011	Best Actress in a Motion Picture – Comedy or Musical	Love & Other Drugs	Nominated	
2013	Best Supporting Actress – Motion Picture	Les Misérables	Won	

== Miscellaneous awards ==
Awards and nominations received by Anne Hathaway
Organizations (Note: Awards, festivals, honors and other miscellaneous organizations are listed in alphabetical order.)	Year	Category	Nominated work	Result	Ref.
British Independent Film Awards	2007	Best Actress in a British Independent Film	Becoming Jane	Nominated	
Dorian Awards	2013	Film Performance of the Year – Actress	Les Misérables	Won	
Drama Desk Award	2010	Outstanding Actress in a Play	Twelfth Night	Nominated	
Drama League Award	2016	Distinguished Performance	Grounded	Nominated	
DVD Exclusive Awards	2006	Best Actress (in a DVD Premiere Movie)	Havoc	Won	
Empire Awards	2013	Best Actress	The Dark Knight Rises	Nominated	
Golden Raspberry Awards	2020	Worst Actress	Serenity / The Hustle	Nominated	
Golden Raspberry Awards	2021	Worst Actress	The Last Thing He Wanted / The Witches	Nominated	
Gotham Awards	2005	Best Ensemble Cast	Brokeback Mountain	Nominated	
Gotham Awards	2008	Best Ensemble Cast	Rachel Getting Married	Nominated	
Independent Spirit Awards	2009	Best Female Lead	Rachel Getting Married	Nominated	
Independent Spirit Awards	2024	Best Supporting Performance	Eileen	Nominated	
MTV Movie & TV Awards	2002	Best Breakthrough Performance	The Princess Diaries	Nominated	
MTV Movie & TV Awards	2009	Best Fight	Bride Wars	Nominated	
MTV Movie & TV Awards	2009	Best Female Performance	Bride Wars	Nominated	
MTV Movie & TV Awards	2013	Best Female Performance	Les Misérables	Nominated	
MTV Movie & TV Awards	2013	Best Musical Moment	Les Misérables	Nominated	
MTV Movie & TV Awards	2013	Best Hero	The Dark Knight Rises	Nominated	
Nickelodeon Kids' Choice Awards	2009	Favorite Movie Actress	Get Smart	Nominated	
Nickelodeon Kids' Choice Awards	2013	Favorite Female Buttkicker	The Dark Knight Rises	Nominated	
Nickelodeon Kids' Choice Awards	2021	Favorite Movie Actress	The Witches	Nominated	
Palm Springs International Film Festival	2009	Desert Palm Achievement Award	Rachel Getting Married	Won	
People's Choice Awards	2012	Favorite Animated Movie Voice	Rio	Nominated	
People's Choice Awards	2012	Favorite Movie Actress	One Day	Nominated	
People's Choice Awards	2013	Favorite Face of Heroism	The Dark Knight Rises	Nominated	
People's Choice Awards	2013	Favorite Movie Actress	The Dark Knight Rises	Nominated	
People's Choice Awards	2016	Favorite Movie Actress	The Intern	Nominated	
People's Choice Awards	2018	The Female Movie Star of 2018	Ocean's 8	Nominated	
Santa Barbara International Film Festival	2027	American Riviera Award	The Odyssey	Honored	
Satellite Awards	2008	Best Actress – Motion Picture	Rachel Getting Married	Nominated	
Satellite Awards	2010	Best Actress – Motion Picture	Love & Other Drugs	Won	
Satellite Awards	2012	Best Cast – Motion Picture	Les Misérables	Won	
Satellite Awards	2012	Best Supporting Actress – Motion Picture	Les Misérables	Won	
Saturn Awards	2013	Best Supporting Actress	The Dark Knight Rises	Won	
Saturn Awards	2013	Best Supporting Actress	Les Misérables	Nominated	
Saturn Awards	2015	Best Actress	Interstellar	Nominated	
Scream Awards	2010	Best Supporting Actress	Alice in Wonderland	Won	
Teen Choice Awards	2000	Choice TV Actress	Get Real	Nominated	
Teen Choice Awards	2002	Choice Movie Actress – Comedy	The Princess Diaries	Nominated	
Teen Choice Awards	2006	Choice Movie: Chemistry	The Devil Wears Prada	Nominated (Note: Shared with Meryl Streep)	
Teen Choice Awards	2009	Choice Movie Actress – Comedy	Bride Wars	Won	
Teen Choice Awards	2009	Choice Movie: Rumble	Bride Wars	Nominated (Note: Shared with Kate Hudson)	
Teen Choice Awards	2009	Choice Movie: Rockstar Moment	Bride Wars	Nominated	
Teen Choice Awards	2011	Choice Animated Voice	Rio	Nominated	
Teen Choice Awards	2013	Choice Movie Actress: Action	The Dark Knight Rises	Won	
Teen Choice Awards	2013	Choice Movie Actress: Drama	Les Misérables	Nominated	
Young Artist Award	2000	Best Performance in a TV Series – Young Ensemble	Get Real	Nominated	

== Critics awards ==
Awards and nominations received by Anne Hathaway
Organizations (Note: Awards, festivals, honors and other miscellaneous organizations are listed in alphabetical order.)	Year	Category	Nominated work	Result	Ref.
Alliance of Women Film Journalists	2009	Best Ensemble Cast	Rachel Getting Married	Won	
Alliance of Women Film Journalists	2012	Best Animated Female	Rio	Nominated	
Alliance of Women Film Journalists	2013	Best Actress in a Supporting Role	Les Misérables	Won	
Alliance of Women Film Journalists	2013	Unforgettable Moment	Les Misérables	Won (Note: Shared with Jessica Chastain)	
Alliance of Women Film Journalists	2013	Kick Ass Award For Best Female Action Star	The Dark Knight Rises	Nominated	
Astra TV Awards	2022	Best Actress in a Limited Series or Movie	WeCrashed	Nominated	
Austin Film Critics Association	2008	Best Actress	Rachel Getting Married	Won	
Austin Film Critics Association	2012	Best Supporting Actress	Les Misérables	Won	
Boston Online Film Critics Association	2012	Best Supporting Actress	Les Misérables	Won	
Boston Society of Film Critics	2008	Best Actress	Rachel Getting Married	Runner-up	
Chicago Film Critics Association	2008	Best Actress	Rachel Getting Married	Won	
Chicago Film Critics Association	2012	Best Supporting Actress	Les Misérables	Nominated	
Dallas–Fort Worth Film Critics Association	2008	Best Actress	Rachel Getting Married	Won	
Dallas–Fort Worth Film Critics Association	2012	Best Supporting Actress	Les Misérables	Nominated	
Florida Film Critics Circle	2012	Best Supporting Actress	Les Misérables	Won	
Houston Film Critics Society	2008	Best Actress	Rachel Getting Married	Won	
Houston Film Critics Society	2012	Best Supporting Actress	Les Misérables	Won	
International Cinephile Society	2009	Best Actress	Rachel Getting Married	Nominated	
Kansas City Film Critics Circle	2012	Best Supporting Actress	Les Misérables	Won	
London Film Critics' Circle	2009	Actress of the Year	Rachel Getting Married	Nominated	
London Film Critics' Circle	2013	Supporting Actress of the Year	Les Misérables	Won	
Los Angeles Film Critics Association	2012	Best Supporting Actress	The Dark Knight Rises / Les Misérables	Runner-up	
National Board of Review	2002	Best Cast	Nicholas Nickleby	Won	
National Board of Review	2009	Best Actress	Rachel Getting Married	Won	
National Board of Review	2013	Best Cast	Les Misérables	Won	
National Society of Film Critics	2013	Best Supporting Actress	Les Misérables	3rd place	
New York Film Critics Circle	2008	Best Actress	Rachel Getting Married	3rd place	
New York Film Critics Circle	2012	Best Supporting Actress	Les Misérables	Runner-up	
New York Film Critics Online	2012	Best Supporting Actress	Les Misérables	Won	
Online Film Critics Society	2008	Best Actress	Rachel Getting Married	Nominated	
Online Film Critics Society	2012	Best Supporting Actress	Les Misérables	Won	
Phoenix Film Critics Society	2012	Best Actress in a Supporting Role	Les Misérables	Won	
Phoenix Film Critics Society	2012	Best Ensemble Acting	Les Misérables	Nominated	
San Diego Film Critics Society	2012	Best Performance by an Ensemble	Les Misérables	Nominated	
San Diego Film Critics Society	2012	Best Supporting Actress	Les Misérables	Nominated	
Southeastern Film Critics Association	2008	Best Actress	Rachel Getting Married	Won	
Southeastern Film Critics Association	2012	Best Supporting Actress	Les Misérables	Won	
St. Louis Film Critics Association	2008	Best Actress	Rachel Getting Married	Nominated	
St. Louis Film Critics Association	2012	Best Supporting Actress	Les Misérables	Nominated	
Toronto Film Critics Association	2008	Best Actress	Rachel Getting Married	Runner-up	
Toronto Film Critics Association	2012	Best Supporting Actress	Les Misérables	Nominated	
Vancouver Film Critics Circle	2012	Best Supporting Actress	Les Misérables	Nominated	
Washington D.C. Area Film Critics Association	2010	Best Actress	Love & Other Drugs	Nominated	
Washington D.C. Area Film Critics Association	2012	Best Supporting Actress	Les Misérables	Won	
Washington D.C. Area Film Critics Association	2012	Best Ensemble	Les Misérables	Won	
Women Film Critics Circle	2012	Best Actress	Les Misérables	Won	
