= The Witches (1990 film) =

Film by Nicolas Roeg

- Theatrical release poster
- Directed by: Nicolas Roeg
- Screenplay by: Allan Scott
- Based on: The Witches by Roald Dahl
- Produced by: Mark Shivas
- Starring: Anjelica Huston; Mai Zetterling
- Cinematography: Harvey Harrison
- Edited by: Tony Lawson
- Music by: Stanley Myers
- Production companies: Lorimar Film Entertainment; Jim Henson Productions
- Distributed by: Warner Bros.
- Release dates: May 25, 1990 (United Kingdom); August 24, 1990 (United States)
- Running time: 91 minutes
- Countries: United Kingdom; United States
- Language: English
- Budget: $11 million
- Box office: $15.3 million

The Witches is a 1990 dark fantasy comedy film directed by Nicolas Roeg from a screenplay by Allan Scott and based on Roald Dahl's novel of the same name. The film stars Anjelica Huston and Mai Zetterling and concerns evil witches who masquerade as ordinary women and follows an orphaned boy and his grandmother, who must find a way to foil their plot of ridding the world of children.

It is the last film project executive producer Jim Henson worked on before his death, with Jim Henson Productions co-producing the film and Jim Henson's Creature Shop designing and building the prosthetics for the titular characters and animatronic murids that were used interchangeably with real ones. Filming took place in Norway and England from April to August of 1988. The film's release was delayed following the dissolution of its theatrical distributor Lorimar Film Entertainment.

The Witches was theatrically released in the United Kingdom on May 25, 1990, and in the United States on August 24, by Warner Bros. The film was a box-office failure, grossing $15.3 million on an $11 million budget. Although Dahl disliked its differences from the source material, namely the ending, The Witches received positive reviews from critics and developed a cult following over the years.

== Plot ==
During a visit to his grandmother Helga in Norway, an eight-year-old American boy Luke Eveshim is told about "witches", feminine demons who detest children and use various methods to dispose of them while masquerading as ordinary women. They are described to have claws instead of fingernails which they hide by wearing gloves, bald heads which they obscure with wigs that give them rashes, square-ended and toeless feet that are concealed by sensible shoes, a purple tinge in their pupils and a powerful sense of smell which they use to detect children. To a witch, clean children are repulsive; the dirtier the children, the less likely they are to smell them. Helga additionally recounts how her childhood friend, Erica, fell victim to a witch who lived opposite to her and was cursed to spend the rest of her life trapped inside a painting, aging gradually and changing her position within it, until finally disappearing a few years prior.

After Luke's parents die in a car accident, Helga becomes Luke's legal guardian as they move to England. While playing outside, Luke is approached by a woman he identifies as a witch, trying to lure him to her with a snake and a chocolate bar, so he stands his ground and the witch leaves. He had already heard one of his friends mention that he had recently seen a woman with purple eyes.

On Luke's ninth birthday, Helga contracts diabetes; her doctor advises them to take a vacation at the seaside Hotel Excelsior. There, Luke meets and befriends gluttonous but friendly Bruno Jenkins, while unintentionally antagonizing the hotel manager, R.J. Stringer III, after his pet mice frighten his maid girlfriend, Marlene. Additionally at the hotel is a convention of witches, masquerading as the Royal Society for the Prevention of Cruelty to Children (RSPCC). The Grand High Witch, the all-powerful leader of the world's witches, is attending under the alias Eva Ernst.

As Luke hides and spies on the witches' meeting, the Grand High Witch unveils her latest creation – a magic potion to transform all the world's children into mice, which will be used in products at confectionery stores to be purchased using money she provides. Bruno, who was given the potion earlier, is lured into the room, transforms into a mouse and flees. Luke is discovered and, after a chase, runs to Helga in their room but finds her in a diabetes-induced state. He is then captured by the witches as they force-feed him the potion, transforming into a mouse before he escapes. He finds Bruno and reunites with Helga, who has since recovered. Luke, now a mouse, devises a plan to defeat the witches by sneaking into the Grand High Witch's room to steal a bottle of the potion and putting it into the cress soup for an upcoming banquet. The Eveshims try to get Bruno to his parents, but they do not believe them and are frightened by his condition.

Luke narrowly manages to obtain the formula and sneaks into the kitchen where he puts it into the soup. As the witches attend the banquet, Susan Irvine, the Grand High Witch's much-abused assistant, quits upon being banned from the celebration. At dinner, Bruno's father orders the soup, though Helga stops him from consuming it as he and his wife finally realise what the witches did to their son when he speaks up. The formula then turns all the witches into mice and the hotel's staff and guests join in exterminating them, unknowingly ridding England of its witches except Irvine, who shows up later completely shocked at the sight.

Helga traps the Grand High Witch under a water jug and leaves Stringer to dispatch her with a cleaver before returning Bruno to his bewildered parents. The Eveshims return home and receive a delivery of the Grand High Witch's trunk full of money and an address book of all witches in the United States, allowing them to plan their move against these witches.

That night, a now-reformed Irvine visits the Eveshims' house and returns Luke to his human form, as well as his returning his pet mice and glasses, before leaving to do the same with Bruno as the Eveshims bid her farewell.

== Cast ==
- Anjelica Huston as Eva Ernst / The Grand High Witch, the all-powerful leader of the world's witches
  - Huston additionally provided the voice of the character's murid form.
- Mai Zetterling as Helga Eveshim, Luke's grandmother, who is an old enemy of the Grand High Witch
  - Kristen Steinsland additionally portrayed the character's younger self.
- Jasen Fisher as Luke Eveshim, Helga's grandson
  - Fisher additionally provided the voice of the character's murid form.
- Rowan Atkinson as R.J. Stringer III, Hotel Excelsior's manager
- Bill Paterson as Mr. Herbert Jenkins, Bruno's father
- Brenda Blethyn as Mrs. Jenkins, Bruno's unnamed mother
- Charlie Potter as Bruno Jenkins, a gluttonous boy who befriends Luke.
  - Potter additionally provided the voice of the character's murid form.
- Anne Lambton as an unnamed witch dressed in black who tries to entice Luke with chocolate and a snake
- Jane Horrocks as Susan Irvine, the Grand High Witch's much-abused assistant
- Sukie Smith as Marlene, a maid at Hotel Excelsior who is Stringer's girlfriend
- Rose English as Dora, a witch who is murdered by the Grand High Witch
- Jenny Runacre as Elsie, a witch who works as a maid at Hotel Excelsior
- Annabel Brooks as Nicola Cuttle, a witch
- Emma Relph as Millie, a witch
- Nora Connolly as Beatrice, a witch
- Rosamund Greenwood as Janice, a witch
- Angelique Rockas as Henrietta, a witch who inquires about the Grand High Witch's newly-devised scheme
- Ann Tirard as a meeting witch
- Leila Hoffman as a meeting witch
- Jim Carter as Hotel Excelsior's head chef
- Roberta Taylor as the witch who works as a chef in the hotel's kitchen and the first to be turned into a mouse when she samples the soup.
- Darcy Flynn as Luke's unnamed mother
- Vincent Marzello as Luke's unnamed father
- Grete Nordrå as a Norwegian witch
- Elsie Eide as Erica
- Merete Armand as Erica's unnamed mother
- Ola Otnes as Erica's unnamed father
- Stella Tanner as a meeting witch (uncredited)
- Barbara Hicks as a meeting witch (uncredited)
- Wendy Lowder as a meeting witch (uncredited)
- Julia Wiltman (uncredited)
- Lois Leffour (uncredited)
- Ina Clay Beckenham (uncredited)

== Production ==
=== Background ===
The Witches was adapted from the children's book of the same title by British author Roald Dahl. It was the final film that Jim Henson personally worked on before his death, the final theatrical film produced by Lorimar Productions, and the last film made based on Dahl's material before his death (both Henson and Dahl died that year).

The following people did special puppeteer work in this film: Anthony Asbury, Don Austen (Bruno's mouse form), Sue Dacre, David Greenaway, Brian Henson, Robert Tygner, and Steve Whitmire (Luke's mouse form). During the shoot, Rowan Atkinson left the bath taps running in his room (the frantically knocking porter was told "go away, I'm asleep"). The flood wrote off much of the production team's electrical equipment on the floor below. At the time, Huston was dating Jack Nicholson, who frequently phoned the hotel and sent huge bouquets, much to the excitement of the staff. Director Nicolas Roeg later cut scenes he thought would be too scary for children after seeing his young son's reaction to the original cut.

The elaborate makeup effects for Huston's Grand High Witch took six hours to apply, and another six to remove. The prosthetics included a full face mask, hump, mechanized claws, and a withered collarbone. Huston described a monologue scene she had to do where "I was so uncomfortable and tired of being encased in rubber under hot lights for hours that the lines had ceased to make sense to me and all I wanted to do was cry." The green vapour used extensively at the end of the film was oil based, and would obscure the contacts in Huston's eyes, which had to be regularly flushed out with water by an expert. Roeg chose a sexy costume for the character to wear, and emphasized to Huston that the Grand High Witch should have sex appeal at all times, despite her grotesque appearance in certain scenes of the film.

=== Filming ===
It was filmed between April 11 and mid-August 1988. The movie was released in the United Kingdom on May 25, 1990, and in the United States on August 24, 1990. The early portion of the film was shot in Bergen, Norway. Much of the rest was shot on location in England, including in Cookham, Berkshire, and at the Headland Hotel, situated on the coast in Newquay, Cornwall.

=== Music ===
Stanley Myers composed the score. To date, a soundtrack CD has not been released, and the entire score remains obscure. Throughout the score, the Dies irae appears, highly reminiscent of Berlioz's Symphonie fantastique Movement V, "Dream of a Witches' Sabbath".

=== Ending ===
Dahl was incensed that Henson had changed his original ending in the script. As a gesture of conciliation, Henson offered to film two versions before he made his final choice: the book version where Luke remains a mouse, and the "happier" version where he is transformed back into a human. During the editing process, Dahl watched an early cut of the film with his original ending, and the final scene brought him to tears. However, Henson and Roeg decided to go with the "happier" ending, which resulted in Dahl stating that he would launch a publicity campaign against the film if his name was not removed from the credits. He was only dissuaded from this on the urging of Henson.

== Release ==
The Witches was slated to be distributed by Lorimar Television, but when the company dissolved their theatrical distribution operation, Lorimar Film Entertainment, it wound up sitting on the shelf for more than a year after filming was completed. The film eventually premiered in nine theaters in Orlando, Florida, and Sacramento, California, on February 10, 1990, to test it on American audiences. It premiered in London on May 25, 1990, and was scheduled to open the same day in the United States, but following the test screenings earlier that year, Warner Bros. Pictures delayed the American release until August 24.

=== Box office ===
The film earned £2,111,841 at the United Kingdom box office, and an estimated $2.2 million in the United States by 28 August 1990. It eventually took in $10,360,553 in the US, and 266,782 in Germany.

=== Critical response ===
On review aggregator Rotten Tomatoes, 94% of 50 critics gave the film a positive review, and an average rating of 7.6/10. The critics consensus reads: "With a deliciously wicked performance from Anjelica Huston and imaginative puppetry by Jim Henson's creature shop, Nicolas Roeg's dark and witty movie captures the spirit of Roald Dahl's writing like few other adaptations." On Metacritic, it has an average score of 78 out of 100, based on reviews from 25 critics, indicating "generally favorable reviews".

Roger Ebert gave the film three out of four stars, calling it "an intriguing movie, ambitious and inventive, and almost worth seeing just for Anjelica Huston's obvious delight in playing a completely uncompromised villainess."

Despite the overall positive reception, Dahl disliked the film and regarded it as "utterly appalling". While he praised Huston's performance as the Grand High Witch, he was critical of the ending that contrasted with his book.

=== Accolades ===
Academy of Science Fiction, Fantasy & Horror Films (1991)

- Nominated – Saturn Award for Best Actress (Anjelica Huston)
- Nominated – Saturn Award for Best Make-up (John Stephenson)
- Nominated – Saturn Award for Best Music (Stanley Myers)
- Nominated – Saturn Award for Best Performance by a Younger Actor (Jasen Fisher)
- Nominated – Saturn Award for Best Supporting Actress (Mai Zetterling)

BAFTA Awards (1991)

- Nominated – BAFTA Award for Best Makeup and Hair (Christine Beveridge)

Boston Society of Film Critics Awards (1991)

- Won – Boston Society of Film Critics Award for Best Actress (Huston)

Fantasporto (1991)

- Nominated – International Fantasy Film Award for Best Film (Roeg)

Hugo Awards (1991)

- Nominated – Hugo Award for Best Dramatic Presentation

Los Angeles Film Critics Association Awards (1990)

- Won – Los Angeles Film Critics Association Award for Best Actress (Huston)

National Society of Film Critics Awards (1990)

- Won – National Society of Film Critics Award for Best Actress (Huston)

=== Home media ===
Warner Home Video first released the film on VHS and LaserDisc in 1991. The second release (and first re-release) was on VHS and for the first time on DVD in 1999. Both versions (and any television screenings) use the original open matte negative of the film, instead of matting it down to 1.85:1 (or 1.66:1). It was released on Blu-ray in Spain only in 2017. In July 2019, a Blu-ray release from Warner Archive Collection was announced, and was released on August 20, 2019. In August 2020, a 30th anniversary Blu-ray release from Warner Bros. in the United Kingdom was announced, in special packaging including a booklet, original theatrical release poster, and four art cards, all housed alongside the disc in a collector's box. It was released on October 12, 2020.

== See also ==
- The Witches (2020 film), another adaptation of the novel
- List of films about witchcraft
- List of films featuring diabetes
