= Nora Connolly =

British actress

Nora Connolly is an Irish actress who has been active on screen since the late 1970s.

She has appeared in productions including Grange Hill, BBC2 Playhouse, Only Fools and Horses, Juliet Bravo, The Bill, The Witches and Bramwell.

== Filmography ==
=== Film ===
| Year | Title | Role | Notes |
|---|---|---|---|
| 1984 | The Razor's Edge | Governess | |
| 1990 | The Witches | Beatrice | |
| 1990 | The Fool | Stage Actress | Uncredited |
| 1997 | Incognito | Barmaid | |
| 1998 | Parting Shots | Mother of the Bride | |
| 2000 | Best | Man with Tattoos' Wife | |
| 2013 | Moments | Dancing Lady 2 | Short film |

=== Television ===
| Year | Title | Role | Notes |
|---|---|---|---|
| 1978 | Bless Me Father | Maureen | Episode: "The Parish Bazaar" |
| 1979 | Play for Today | Chris | Episode: "Waterloo Sunset" |
| 1980 | Grange Hill | Sister | Episode: #3.6 |
| 1980 | Agony | Brenda | Episode: "Television Can Damage Your Health" |
| 1981 | BBC2 Playhouse | Mary Tracy | Episode: "Elizabeth Alone: Part 1" |
| 1981 | Only Fools and Horses | Anita | Episode: "Christmas Crackers" |
| 1984 | Don't Wait Up | Waitress | Episode: "Falling Out" |
| 1985 | Juliet Bravo | Mary Marshall | Episode: "Turbulence" |
| 1994 | Scarlett | Mrs. Scanton | Episode: #1.2 |
| 1995 | Bramwell | Martha | Episode: #1.3 |
| 1987–1996 | The Bill | Glenda Jane Jackson Mrs. Leary Woman at Merchant's House | 4 episodes |
| 1999 | Always and Everyone | Leanne | Episode: "Strike Me Down" |
| 2000 | The Sins | Nun | |
| 2006 | Perfect Day: The Funeral | Mourner 2 | Episode: "The Funeral" |
| 2016 | Fresh Meat | Rita | Episode: #4.3 |
| 2019 | Four Weddings and a Funeral | Mrs. Brule | Episode: "Four Friends and a Secret" |
