= The Witches (novel) =

1983 children's book by Roald Dahl

- First edition cover
- Author: Roald Dahl
- Illustrator: Quentin Blake
- Genre: Children's fantasy Dark fantasy
- Publisher: Jonathan Cape
- Publication date: 27 October 1983
- Publication place: United Kingdom
- Media type: Print
- Pages: 208
- Awards: Whitbread Book Award (1983)
- ISBN: 978-1101662977

The Witches is a 1983 children's novel by British author Roald Dahl. A dark fantasy, the story is set partly in Norway and partly in England, and features the experiences of a young English boy and his Norwegian grandmother in a world where child-hating societies of witches secretly exist in every country. The witches are ruled by the vicious and powerful Grand High Witch, who arrives in England to organise her plan to turn all of the children there into mice.

The Witches was originally published by Jonathan Cape in London, with illustrations by Quentin Blake who had previously collaborated with Dahl. In 2012, the book was ranked number 81 among all-time best children's novels in a survey published by School Library Journal, a US monthly. In 2019, the BBC listed The Witches on its list of the 100 most influential novels. In 2012, the Grand High Witch appeared on a Royal Mail commemorative postage stamp.

The book has been adapted into an unabridged audio reading by Lynn Redgrave, a stage play, a two-part radio dramatization for the BBC, a 1990 film by Warner Bros. directed by Nicolas Roeg and starring Anjelica Huston, a 2008 opera by Marcus Paus and Ole Paus, and a 2020 film also by Warner Bros. directed by Robert Zemeckis and starring Anne Hathaway.

== Plot ==
The story is narrated from the perspective of an unnamed seven-year-old English boy, who goes to live with his Norwegian grandmother after his parents are killed in a car accident. The boy loves all his grandmother's stories, but he is especially enthralled by the stories about real-life witches which are horrific feminine demons which seek to dispose of human children. She tells him that a witch looks exactly like an ordinary woman, but there are ways of telling them apart, such as how they have claws instead of fingernails which they hide by wearing gloves, bald heads which they obscure with wigs that give them rashes, square-ended and toeless feet that are concealed by uncomfortable pointy shoes, eyes with pupils that change colour, blue saliva which they use for ink and have large nostrils which they use to sniff out children, who, to a witch, smell repulsive. The dirtier the child, the less likely a witch can smell them.

As specified in the parents' will, the narrator and his grandmother return to England, where he had been born and had attended school, and where the house he is inheriting is located. The grandmother warns the boy to be on his guard, since English witches are known to be among the most vicious in the world, notorious for turning children into loathsome creatures so unsuspecting adults will dispose of them.

The grandmother reveals that witch customs differ by country and while they each have close affiliations with one another in their own nation, they are not allowed to communicate with foreign witches. She additionally tells him about the mysterious Grand High Witch of All the World, the feared and diabolical leader of all of the world's witches, who visits their councils in every country each year.

"Children are rrree-volting! Vee vill vipe them all avay! Vee vill scrrrub them off the face of the earth! Vee vill flush them down the drain!"

— The Grand High Witch at the secret witches convention.

Shortly after arriving back in England, while the boy is working on the roof of his treehouse, he sees a strange woman in black staring up at him with an eerie smile. The woman attempts to coax him down by claiming she has a present, but the boy quickly realises she is a witch and avoids her.

When the grandmother becomes ill with pneumonia, the doctor orders her to cancel a planned holiday in Norway. Instead, they go to a luxury hotel in Bournemouth on England's south coast. While the boy is training his pet mice given to him as a consolation present by his grandmother, the hotel ballroom hosts the "Royal Society for the Prevention of Cruelty to Children". The boy sneaks into the room beforehand to train his pet mice, but when various ladies soon enter the room, he hides behind a screen. When they reach underneath their hair to scratch at their scalps with gloved hands, the boy realises that this is the yearly gathering of the English witches and that he is trapped in the now-closed room. A young woman goes on stage and removes her entire face, which is a mask. The boy realises that she is none other than the Grand High Witch herself. She expresses her displeasure at the English witches' failure to eliminate enough children and unveils her master plan – all of England's witches are to purchase confectionery stores (with Counterfeit money printed by her from a magical money-making machine) and give away free confections laced with her "Formula 86 Delayed-Action Mouse-Maker", a magic potion which turns the consumer into a mouse at a specified time set by the potion-maker. The intent is for the children's guardians to unwittingly kill the transformed children.

To demonstrate the formula's effectiveness, the Grand High Witch brings in Bruno Jenkins, a rich and greedy boy lured to the convention hall with the promise of free chocolate. She reveals that she had tricked Bruno into eating a chocolate bar laced with the formula the day before and had set the "alarm" to go off during the meeting. The potion takes effect, transforming Bruno into a mouse before the assembled witches. Shortly after, the witches detect the narrator's presence and corner him. The Grand High Witch then pours an entire bottle of Formula 86 down his throat and the overdose instantly turns him into a mouse. However, the transformed child retains his mentality, personality and even his voice – refusing to be lured into a mouse-trap. After tracking down Bruno, the transformed boy returns to his grandmother's hotel room and tells her what he has learned. He suggests turning the tables on the witches by slipping the potion into their evening meal. With some difficulty, he manages to get his hands on a bottle of the potion from the Grand High Witch's room.

After an attempt to return Bruno to his parents fails spectacularly (mainly due to his mother's fear of mice), the grandmother takes him and the narrator to the dining hall. The narrator enters the kitchen, where he pours the potion into the green pea soup intended for the witches' dinner. On the way back from the kitchen, a cook spots the narrator and chops off part of his tail with a carving knife, before he manages to escape back to his grandmother. The witches all turn into mice within a few minutes, having had massive overdoses just like the narrator. The hotel staff and the guests all panic and unknowingly end up killing the Grand High Witch and all of England's witches.

Having returned home, the boy and his grandmother vow to rid the world of witches. Impersonating the chief of police of Norway on the telephone, she discovers that the Grand High Witch was living in a castle there. They make plans to travel to the castle, use the potion to change her successor and assistants into mice, then release cats to kill them. Using the Grand High Witch's money-making machine and information on witches in various countries, they intend to eradicate them everywhere. The grandmother reveals that, as a mouse, the boy will probably only live for about another nine years, but the boy does not mind, as he does not want to outlive his grandmother (she reveals that she is also likely to live for only nine more years), as he would hate to have anyone else look after him.

== Background ==
Dahl based the novel on his own childhood experiences, with the character of the grandmother modelled on Sofie Dahl, the author’s mother. The author was "well satisfied" by his work on The Witches, a sentiment which literary biographer Robert Carrick believes may have come from the fact that the novel was a departure from Dahl’s usual “all-problem-solving finish.” Dahl did not work on the novel alone; he was aided by editor Stephen Roxburgh, who helped rework The Witches. Roxburgh’s advice was very extensive and covered areas such as improving plots, tightening up Dahl’s writing, and re-inventing characters. Soon after its publication, the illustrations by Blake were complimented.

== Analysis ==
Due to the complexity of The Witches and its departure from a typical Dahl novel, several academics have analysed the work. One perspective offered by Castleton University professor James Curtis suggests that the rejection of the novel by parents is caused by its focus on "child-hate" and Dahl's reluctance to shield children from such a reality. The scholar argues that the book showcases a treatment of children that is similar to historical and modern examples; however, Dahl's determination to expose to his young readers the truth can be controversial. Despite society occasionally making progress in its treatment of children, Curtis argues that different aspects of child-hate displayed in Dahl's work reflects real patterns in how adults have historically harmed or controlled children. As the boy's grandmother informs him, the witches usually strike children when they are alone; Curtis uses this information from the novel to connect to the historical problem of child abandonment. As children have been maimed or killed due to abandonment, children are harmed by witches in the novel when they have been left alone. The character Grandmamma is presented as an adult who genuinely values childhood, and the narration often treats the child protagonist and child readers with seriousness and attention. The central claim according to Curtis is that the book suggests child-hatred can appear disguised as care. Curtis approved the book's usefulness for illustrating these themes.

== Reception ==
In 2012, The Witches was ranked number 81 among all-time children's novels in a survey published by School Library Journal, a monthly with a primarily US audience. It was the third of four books by Dahl among the Top 100, more than any other writer. In November 2019, the BBC listed The Witches on its list of the 100 most influential novels. In 2023, the novel was ranked by BBC at no. 61 in their poll of "The 100 greatest children's books of all time".

The novel was positively received in the United States, but with a few warnings due to the more fear-inducing parts of it. Ann Waldron of the Philadelphia Inquirer wrote in her 1983 review that she would suggest not gifting the book to a child who is more emotional to particularly frightening scenarios.

Some libraries in England banned The Witches after perceived misogyny, citing Dahl's assertion that witches are exclusively women and that ghouls, by contrast, are always male. It appears on the American Library Association list of the 100 Most Frequently Challenged Books of 1990 to 1999, at number 22.

Jemma Crew of the New Statesman considers it an "unlikely source of inspiration for feminists". The Times article "Not in Front of the Censors" suggests that the least interesting thing to a child about a witch is that they appear to look like a woman, and even offers the perspective that a witch might be a very feminist role model to a young school girl.

Maria Nikolajeva, professor of education at the University of Cambridge, suggested that the ending of the book might encourage suicide in children by telling them they can avoid growing up by dying.

== 2023 censorship controversy ==
Despite Roald Dahl having urged his publishers to not "so much as change a single comma in one of my books", in February 2023, Puffin Books, a division of Penguin Books, announced it would be re-writing portions of many of Dahl's children's novels, changing the language to, in the publisher's words, "ensure that it can continue to be enjoyed by all today." The decision was met with strong criticism from groups and public figures including authors Salman Rushdie, and Christopher Paolini, British prime minister Rishi Sunak, Queen Camilla, Kemi Badenoch, PEN America, and Brian Cox. In an interview with Newsnight, author Margaret Atwood said concerning the censorship: "Good luck with Roald Dahl. You're just really going to have to replace the whole book if you want things to be nice. But this started a long time ago; it was the Disneyfication of fairy tales. What do I think of it? I'm with Chaucer, who said, 'If you don't like this tale, turn over the page and read something else.'" Dahl's publishers in the United States, France, and the Netherlands announced they had declined to incorporate the changes.

In The Witches, more than 50 changes were made, including major alterations to the descriptions of the witches' baldness and wearing of wigs (including adding an additional sentence not found in the original work, defending the wearing of wigs by women), removing many references to women's appearances, removing grotesque or insulting words like pimply, filthy, and hag, and removing instances of the word fat (e.g., changing "fat little brown mouse" to "little brown mouse").

Original text	2023 text
'Don't be foolish,' my grandmother said. 'You can't go round pulling the hair of every lady you meet, even if she is wearing gloves. Just you try it and see what happens.'	'Don't be foolish,' my grandmother said. 'Besides, there are plenty of other reasons why women might wear wigs and there is certainly nothing wrong with that.'

== Adaptations ==
=== Film ===
==== 1990 film ====
In 1990, The Witches was adapted into a film starring Anjelica Huston and Rowan Atkinson, directed by Nicolas Roeg, co-produced by Jim Henson, and distributed by Warner Bros. Pictures. In the film, the boy is American and named Luke Eveshim, his grandmother is named Helga Eveshim, and The Grand High Witch is named Evangeline Ernst.

The most notable difference from the book is that the boy is restored to human form at the end of the story by the Grand High Witch's assistant (a character who does not appear in the book), who had renounced her former evil. Dahl regarded the film as "utterly appalling".

==== 2020 film ====
Another film adaptation, co-written and directed by Robert Zemeckis and starring Anne Hathaway as the Grand High Witch, was released in October 2020 on HBO Max, after it was removed from its original release date due to the COVID-19 pandemic. The most notable difference from the book is that this adaptation takes place in 1968 Alabama, and the protagonist is an African-American boy who is called "Hero Boy". The adaptation also stays true to the book's ending rather than the 1990 film, having the protagonist stay a mouse at the end.

=== Audio ===
==== Audiobooks ====
The book has been recorded three times:

- 1998, abridged, by Simon Callow for Penguin Children Audiobooks.
- 2007, unabridged, by Lynn Redgrave for Harper Childrens Audio
- 2016, unabridged, by Miranda Richardson for Penguin Audio

==== Radio ====
In 2008, BBC Radio 4's Classic Serial broadcast a two-part dramatisation of the novel by Lucy Catherine, directed by Claire Grove. The cast included Margaret Tyzack as the Grandmother, Toby Jones as the Narrator, Ryan Watson as the Boy, Jordan Clarke as Bruno and Amanda Lawrence as the Grand High Witch.

=== Stage ===
==== 1992 play ====
A stage adaptation by David Wood was first presented at the Lyceum Theatre, Sheffield in 1992, following a tour and a Christmas season at the Duke of York's Theatre in London's West End. The adaptation has since been performed in numerous productions in both London and across the UK.

==== 2008 opera ====
The book was adapted into an opera by Norwegian composer Marcus Paus and his father, Ole Paus, who wrote the libretto. It premiered in 2008.

==== 2023 musical ====
A musical adaptation was originally announced to be in development at the National Theatre, London for a 2018 festive season premiere. The musical premiered at the National Theatre in November 2023, directed by Lyndsey Turner, with book and lyrics by Lucy Kirkwood, and music and lyrics by Dave Malloy, and was projected to run until 27 January 2024.
