= The Witches (opera) =

Opera by Marcus Paus and Ole Paus

- Opera by Marcus Paus
- Librettist: Ole Paus
- Language: Norwegian
- Based on: The Witches by Roald Dahl
- Premiere: 2008; Gloppen Musikkfest

The Witches is a children's opera composed by Marcus Paus to a Norwegian-language libretto by Ole Paus, and based on the 1983 novel of the same name by Roald Dahl. It was written for Gloppen Musikkfest, and was first performed in 2008 with Tora Augestad as the eponymous Grand High Witch. The opera was written especially with Augestad in mind.
