= Grand High Witch =

The Grand High Witch
- The Witches character
- Anjelica Huston as the Grand High Witch in the 1990 film
- First appearance: The Witches (1983)
- Created by: Roald Dahl
- Portrayed by: Anjelica Huston (1990 film); Anne Hathaway (2020 film); Tora Augestad (opera); Amanda Laurence (radio drama)
- Aliases: Eva Ernst (1990 film); Lilith (2020 film)
- Species: Demon
- Gender: Female
- Occupation: Witch

The Grand High Witch of All the World, or simply the Grand High Witch, known as Eva Ernst and Lilith, is a fictional character and the main antagonist in the 1983 children's dark fantasy novel The Witches by Roald Dahl, as well as its graphic novel and film adaptations, in which she was played by Anjelica Huston (in 1990) and Anne Hathaway (in 2020). In the narrative, it is a title given to the all-powerful leader of all the witches on Earth.

The Witches presents The Grand High Witch as a particularly powerful, evil and feared witch who hides her ancient age and hideous appearance behind an attractive disguise, in order to blend in with society, and plots to wipe out all the children in England after summoning the country's witches for the task. The boy protagonist and his grandmother (herself a retired witch-hunter who once searched the world for the Witch) happen to encounter her at a hotel in England, setting the novel's main plot in motion.

== Storyline and characterisation ==
The Grand High Witch is described as the most powerful and most evil witch in the world, and is the only link between the secret societies of demonic witches that exist in various countries, as they are not allowed to contact each other. The Grand High Witch's headquarters is a great castle in Norway, where she has a magic money-printing machine and lives with large retinue of special assistant witches, tyrannically ruling over all the witches anywhere and plotting ever more harm to children everywhere. The current Grand High Witch, who is unnamed in the book but goes under the alias of Eva Ernst (Miss Eva / Miss Ernst) in the film, is described as "the most evil and appalling woman in the world".

In the backstory, the boy protagonist (Luke Eveshim in the 1990 film, Charlie Hansen in the 2020 film) has a grandmother (known as just Grandmamma in the book, and named Helga Eveshim in the 1990 film and Agatha Hansen in the 2020 film) who is the nemesis of The Grand High Witch. The grandmother had once been one of the very best of the witch-hunters and has travelled all over the globe trying to track down the fabled and elusive Grand High Witch, who might be the key to finally defeat her evil kind. The Grand High Witch has a heavy foreign accent and it is implied she is originally from Germany. As discovered about her at the end of the book, after she is destroyed: "Nobody in the world had the faintest idea who she was except the other witches. Wherever she went, people simply knew her as a nice lady (...) Even in her home district, in the village where she lived, people knew her as a kindly and very wealthy Baroness who gave large sums of money to charity." The original version of character is relatively asexual compared to the highly sexualized portrayal in the film adaptation, as she is described only in terms such as being young and "very pretty". In the film version she travels with her black cat, whom she calls Liebchen.

The Grand High Witch first appears in person as a mysterious and seemingly wealthy woman who arrives with a group of distinguished ladies for an annual convention of the ironically named RSPCC (Royal Society for the Prevention of Cruelty to Children, reminiscent of the real-life National Society for the Prevention of Cruelty to Children). In her disguise, she is dressed entirely in black and with a "look of serpents" and "brilliant snake's eyes". However, soon the protagonist boy finds out that the RSPCC is really a coven of English witches and the society's chairwoman is revealed as the frightening Grand High Witch herself. Removing her synthetic face, she reveals that she is really an extremely elderly and hideous hag. All the other witches are terrified of her immense power, ruthlessness and boundless cruelty. She is portrayed as having overtly supernatural powers. In previous meetings, The Grand High Witch made it a custom to casually murder at least one of her minion witches simply to keep the others fearful of her, and now she does it by incinerating a timid English witch for speaking out of turn. She has already tortured and killed thousands of children around the world, and in the book she also keeps three of them just recently turned into frogs in her room, intending for them to be eaten alive by seagulls. Now she plans to give the witches of England her newest invention, the "Formula 86 Delayed Action Mouse-Maker" to distribute and turn all children in the country into mice so they can be exterminated by their own parents.

In the 1990 film of The Witches, The Grand High Witch is a tall, mysterious, attractive, snobbish and foreign aristocrat, a glamorously and provocatively dressed femme fatale type with heavily made-up appearance, full of dominating and predatory "vamp" sexuality. Here, she attracts attention of men, including the character of Mr. Jenkins who unsuccessfully flirts with her right in front of his wife (unaware that she has just turned his son into a mouse), and acts in erotic and seductive ways even when tauntingly interacting with children; she is sexually sadistic, even deriving such an excitement and pleasure from hurting children in particular, that she is actually shown as having an orgasmic experience. The other witches fear and adore her, often praising her intelligence. Haughty, cunning, dramatic, impatient and volatile, she does not care how her commands are carried out, just so long as they are obeyed. She has an assistant named Susan Irvine, who eventually walks out on her after becoming tired of her incompetent behavior and being mistreated, ultimately becoming good and restoring Luke and Bruno back to normal at the end. One witch with whom she is shown to be actually friendly with is "the Woman in Black", who attempted to kill Luke earlier in the story and is given a larger role in the film.

In the original book's chapter The Triumph, The Grand High Witch's own magic is used against her and her followers during their public banquet at the hotel's ballroom, when they are all transformed into brown mice by a massive overdose of Formula 86. It is said that each and every witch has been "smashed and bashed and chopped up into little pieces" by the hotel employees, and that The Grand High Witch was chopped up into pieces by the head chef. In the film, they begin turning into mice with black-and-white fur, except for the fuming Grand High Witch, who is last to be affected as she resists the effects due to her sheer power. She recognizes Helga and attempts to curse her "old adversary" (having perhaps encountered Helga when she was attempting to track down the Grand High Witch), but then Bruno (a boy turned into a mouse) finds the courage to leap onto her cleavage and bite her, which breaks her concentration and she too begins to painfully transform - in her case into a large, nasty and hairless rat. A panic and utter chaos ensues and the hotel staff members begin to violently take on what they think is a sudden infestation, unknowingly massacring the helpless mice-witches as they run around squeaking. "Her Grandness" herself, in her rodent form and now left without any sort of power whatsoever except still being able to talk even after the overdose, is spotted by Luke, who tells his grandmother not to "let her get away". Frantically pleading "get away from me", she is trapped under a glass water pitcher by Helga, who asks the hotel manager Mr. Stringer to dispose for her of this "especially infectious one". The Grand High Witch ends up unceremoniously executed when she is sliced in half with a cleaver in her rat form, finally ending Helga's long conflict, and with the witch population of England now wiped out.

The book ends with the protagonists planning to destroy The Grand High Witch's retainers and conquer her castle, and then use its various magical resources to systematically hunt down the unsuspecting witches of every country and rid the world of them forever. In the ending to the 1990 film, a now-reformed Irvine arrives to reverse the mouse transformation from Luke and restore him to human form. Luke and Helga are planning to get rid of all the evil witches with the money, address and resources that Luke stole from The Grand High Witch.

In the 2020 film, the role of The Grand High Witch was expanded where she was responsible for turning the grandmother's friend Alice Blue into a chicken by giving her chocolate with a magic potion that did the job. In addition, she is depicted with one toe on each foot and elongating arms. When she is turned into a rat, The Grand High Witch is trapped in an ice bucket by the grandmother. Before the grandmother and the children leave the room, the former seizes the Grand High Witch's trunk full of money and releases her cat Hades from its cage. As they close the door, Hades mauls her to death.

== Behind the scenes ==
As part of the publicity for Matilda the Musical, Lucy Dahl, the daughter of the author Roald Dahl, was interviewed about her father's books. She discussed The Witches at length, citing The Grand High Witch was inspired by her stepmother. Her stepmother's personality was not the factor, but it was her social status and look. Lucy also seriously stated she was not entirely sure witches were fiction, saying, "There's this older lady, a neighbor. If witches are real, she's one of them."

For the 1990 film adaptation, Anjelica Huston and the costume designer Marit Allen originally brought a different dress for Huston's role as The Grand High Witch, but the director Nicolas Roeg rejected it as "not sexy". Huston recalled: "That was the first time I'd imagined that this horrible creature in a children's movie should have sex appeal. It simply had not occurred to me. But of course, Nic was absolutely right. His vision was diabolical and dark and brilliantly funny. If a witch was to be at the center of this plot, she needed to be sexy to hold the eye." The character's monstrous version was prepared by Jim Henson's Creature Shop: "The prosthetics for Ernst's transformation to The Grand High Witch were extensive. The various features—contact lenses, full facial mask, hump, withered collarbone and hands—took over six hours to apply and almost as much time to remove at the end of the day." Nonetheless, it has remained one of her favorite roles.

In 2018, it was announced that Anne Hathaway would star as The Grand High Witch in the 2020 film adaptation. The film itself garnered mixed reviews from critics.

== Reception ==
The initial depictions of the Grand High Witch were overall very well received for various reasons, having remained a highly popular and memorable character in both the original novel and in the 1990 film adaptation (as one of the best movie witches or in other aspects). Anjelica Huston's campy, over-the-top portrayal in the film was also acclaimed by reviewers at the time, earning her awards from the Los Angeles Film Critics Association and the National Society of Film Critics among other wins and nominations.

Anne Hathway's enactment of the character in the 2020 remake was met with widespread criticism from disability campaigners. They condemned the three fingered depiction of the character, a choice they feared would have a negative impact on children with limb differences. Warner Bros professed they were "deeply saddened" at the news that Robert Zemeckis' film had upset people with disabilities, "it was never the intention for viewers to feel that the fantastical, non-human creatures were meant to represent them." Hathaway apologised for the negative representation of those with limb differences later the same week via an Instagram post on 5 November 2020.
