= Jamie Reidy =

American author (born 1970)

Jamie Reidy (born March 31, 1970) is an author, screenwriter and Huffington Post blogger.

After graduating from the University of Notre Dame in 1992, he served with distinction as a U.S. Army officer. He then spent nine years in pharmaceutical sales with Pfizer and Eli Lilly and Company.

His first book Hard Sell: The Evolution of a Viagra Salesman offers a self-deprecating look at the life of a drug rep, climaxing in his selling Viagra. Fox 2000 produced the film Love & Other Drugs based on the book. Reidy’s second book Bachelor 101: Cooking + Cleaning = Closing is a cookbook/lifestyle guide for single guys.

His third book, A Walk's As Good As A Hit was published by HumorOutcasts Press in 2013.

On the Huffington Post, he maintains a blog that contains nothing political.

Reidy has appeared live on CNBC's Power Lunch, Squawk Box and Closing Bell, and on CNN's In The Money.
