= Love & Other Drugs =

2010 film by Edward Zwick

- Theatrical release poster
- Directed by: Edward Zwick
- Screenplay by: Charles Randolph; Edward Zwick; Marshall Herskovitz
- Based on: Hard Sell: The Evolution of a Viagra Salesman by Jamie Reidy
- Produced by: Scott Stuber; Edward Zwick; Marshall Herskovitz; Charles Randolph; Pieter Jan Brugge
- Starring: Jake Gyllenhaal; Anne Hathaway; Oliver Platt; Hank Azaria; Josh Gad; Gabriel Macht
- Cinematography: Steven Fierberg
- Edited by: Steven Rosenblum
- Music by: James Newton Howard
- Production companies: Fox 2000 Pictures; Regency Enterprises; New Regency; Stuber Pictures; Bedford Falls Productions; Dune Entertainment
- Distributed by: 20th Century Fox
- Release dates: November 4, 2010 (AFI Fest); November 24, 2010 (United States)
- Running time: 112 minutes
- Country: United States
- Language: English
- Budget: $30 million
- Box office: $105 million

Love & Other Drugs is a 2010 American romantic comedy drama film directed, produced and co-written by Edward Zwick and based on Jamie Reidy's 2005 non-fiction book Hard Sell: The Evolution of a Viagra Salesman. Starring Jake Gyllenhaal, Anne Hathaway, Oliver Platt, Hank Azaria, Josh Gad and Gabriel Macht, the film tells the story of a medicine peddler in 1990s Pittsburgh who starts a relationship with a young woman suffering from Parkinson's disease.

Love & Other Drugs premiered at the AFI Fest on November 4, 2010 and was released in theaters on November 24, 2010, by 20th Century Fox. It grossed $105 million against a $30 million budget, and received mixed reviews from critics.

== Plot ==
In 1996, womanizer Jamie Randall is fired from a Pittsburgh electronics store for having sex with his manager's girlfriend. His wealthy brother Josh refers him for a job as a pharmaceutical sales representative.

After attending a Pfizer training program, Jamie goes to work for them, attempting to get doctors to prescribe Zoloft. He is rebuffed, much to the surprise of his regional manager Bruce, who sees him as his ticket to the Chicago market.

Bruce suggests Jamie get Dr. Stan Knight to prescribe Zoloft instead of Prozac, so other doctors will follow. He tries to gain access to Dr. Knight by flirting with his female employees while secretly discarding the Prozac samples.

Knight eventually allows Jamie to observe him examine one of his patients, Maggie Murdock, who has early onset Parkinson's disease. Taking an interest in Maggie, Jamie obtains her number from one of Knight's assistants, whom he previously seduced.

Jamie and Maggie go on a date and agree that neither is interested in a serious relationship, so they start having casual sex. He is beaten up by top-selling Prozac rep, Trey Hannigan, who discovers that Jamie has been discarding his samples. Maggie reveals Trey is an ex-boyfriend, and she tells Jamie a rumor about Jamie's company developing a new drug to treat erectile dysfunction. Bruce confirms that Viagra is about to be marketed.

Jamie starts selling Viagra, which is an instant success. He reveals that he wants a serious relationship, but Maggie breaks up with him. He confronts her while she helps senior citizens onto a bus bound for Canada to obtain cheap prescription drugs. They argue, but Jamie refuses to leave and waits for Maggie all night at a bus stop. Touched, she reciprocates feelings and they resume their relationship.

Maggie accompanies Jamie to a medical conference, where she ends up at a Parkinson's support group across the street. She invites Jamie, and he meets a man whose wife is in the final stages of the disease. Asked for his advice, the man tells him to leave Maggie before her symptoms inevitably worsen.

After the convention, Maggie finally tells Jamie that she loves him. He begins researching Parkinson's and takes her to different specialists around the country for tests. Jamie becomes angry when they arrive at an appointment only to discover it has been rescheduled. Feeling he only wants to be with her if there is a hope for a cure, Maggie breaks up with him.

Sometime later, Jamie and Josh are invited to a party by Knight, where Jamie takes Viagra and has a threesome with two women. He awakens with a rare side effect and goes to the hospital. Sometime later, he goes to a restaurant and encounters Maggie on a date. Bruce arrives and reveals Jamie has been promoted to the Chicago office.

While packing, Jamie finds the videotape recorder with a video of himself and Maggie in happier times. He realizes he wants to be with her, but her boss tells him she has left for Canada for a prescription drug run.

Jamie finds and tells Maggie he loves and needs her. She starts to cry, saying she will need him more. Jamie decides not to take the job in Chicago; instead, he attends University of Pittsburgh School of Medicine to be with her.

== Cast ==
- Jake Gyllenhaal as Jamie Randall
- Anne Hathaway as Maggie Murdock
- Oliver Platt as Bruce Winston
- Hank Azaria as Dr. Stan Knight
- Josh Gad as Josh Randall
- Gabriel Macht as Trey Hannigan
- Judy Greer as Cindy
- George Segal as Dr. James Randall
- Jill Clayburgh as Nancy Randall
- Nikki DeLoach as Christy
- Katheryn Winnick as Lisa
- Natalie Gold as Dr. Helen Randall
- Michael Chernus as Jerry
- Michael Buffer as Pfizer Convention MC
- Bingo O'Malley as Sam
- Jaimie Alexander as Carol (uncredited)

The film was a posthumous release for Jill Clayburgh, who died on November 5, 2010. The film was dedicated to her memory.

== Production ==
=== Background ===
The fact that the film is based in part on Reidy's first-person memoir about his life as a Viagra salesman, and that the drug company Pfizer, along with other drug brand names, including Zoloft and Prozac, are repeatedly referred to, suggesting a conspicuous case of "product placement", director Edward Zwick has denied seeking approval for any of those names.

=== Filming ===
Principal photography began in the Pittsburgh, Pennsylvania region on September 21, 2009. The city was chosen for its atmosphere, rich medical history, the state's tax incentive program for film productions, and the area's experienced crews. Pittsburgh suburbs such as McCandless, Squirrel Hill, Fox Chapel, Sewickley, Aliquippa, and Brownsville were used as locations for the film, as well as Mellon Arena, Jane Street in the South Side between 17th and 18th streets, the Omni William Penn Hotel, The Capital Grille, and Station Square. Pittsburgh doubled as Chicago for some scenes. The studio was in a building that had been a limousine car park.

The scene in the beginning of the film where Gyllenhaal's character works in the audio/video store was shot at the former Don Allen Car Dealership located on Baum Blvd and S. Atlantic Avenue where the East End neighborhoods of Shadyside, Friendship and Bloomfield intersect. The building had been demolished by 2014.

A section of the Mon-Fayette Expressway (Pennsylvania Route 43) in suburban Washington County was used for scenes on November 15–16, delaying traffic. A helicopter was used for filming and 40 to 50 vehicles were brought in for the shoot. Trailers and tents were set up on the campus of Ringgold High School while filming took place on the Expressway. An area was set aside for actors waiting to film their scenes.

In preparing for the film, Hathaway credits the work of Kate Winslet and Penélope Cruz, two actresses "whose work [she] returned to a lot in preparation" for Love & Other Drugs; she believes both have "done nudity with a tremendous amount of sensitivity and dignity". She identified one of her favorite Cruz films, Abre Los Ojos, as work that helped her greatly for her role. Like Gyllenhaal, Hathaway had final cut over those scenes, using it to cut five seconds where she thought "the camera lingered a little bit". Hathaway said that she did not believe her nudity in the film would put off socially conservative people who would otherwise see the film, saying, "just because nudity is such a contentious issue in America people believe that they automatically alienate the conservative parts of America by having nudity. But I give the American public more credit than that. I think that people are curious and people do love love stories. I think people might find it and like it, even though it is a little bit risky."

== Soundtrack ==
Songs used in the film are listed below:

- Two Princes by Spin Doctors
- Cannonball by The Breeders
- Richard Strauss' Also sprach Zarathustra
- Macarena by Los del Rio
- Bob Dylan's Standing in the Doorway
- Praise You by Fatboy Slim
- Supernova by Liz Phair
- The Kink's A Well Respected Man
- Way Over Yonder in the Minor Key by Billy Bragg and Wilco
- Heaven Is a Place on Earth by Belinda Carlisle
- Fleetwod Mac's Show-Biz Blues
- Engine Heart by Mirah
- Jack-Ass by Beck
- Regina Spektor's Fidelity

== Box office ==
Love & Other Drugs was released on November 24, 2010, and opened in 2,455 theaters in the United States, grossing $2,239,489 on its opening day and $9,739,161 in its opening weekend, ranking No. 6 with a per theater average of $3,967. On its second weekend, it remained No. 6 and grossed $5,652,810, averaging $2,300 per theater. By its third weekend it dropped down to No. 8 and made $2,981,509, averaging $1,331 per theater.

The film had a domestic total gross of $32,367,005 against a production budget of $30 million. It fared much better overseas, where it grossed $70,453,003.

== Reception ==
On Rotten Tomatoes gave the film holds an approval rating of 49% based on 170 reviews, with an average rating of 5.8/10. The site's critics consensus reads, "It's a pleasure to see Hollywood produce a romance this refreshingly adult, but Love and Other Drugs struggles to find a balance between its disparate plot elements." Metacritic gave the film a weighted average score of 55 out of 100, based on 38 critics, indicating "mixed or average" reviews. Audiences polled by CinemaScore gave the film an average grade of "B-" on an A+ to F scale.

Roger Ebert of the Chicago Sun-Times gave it two and a half stars out of four, commenting that it "obtains a warm, lovable performance from Anne Hathaway and dimensions from Jake Gyllenhaal that grow from comedy to the serious". Kirk Honeycutt of The Hollywood Reporter gave the film a mixed review, writing: "The energy is far too great—manic even—at the beginning but calms down for a while to focus on the highly competitive but not always ethical arena of drug sales, then gets distracted by unusually bold sex scenes for a studio picture only to wander off into the cultural phenomenon of Viagra before the movie decides it's a romance after all and so concludes in a highly conventional final embrace." A negative review from the East Bay Express described it as "a spectacularly maudlin and repellent piece of work" where the two protagonists "try to outdo each other in the 'who cares' department with their alarmingly off-putting interpersonal communication", leading to "callous salesman jokes, callous sex jokes, even callous jokes about the homeless man who rescues drug samples from the Dumpster." An Associated Press reviewer found the film to be a "run-of-the-mill Hollywood love story".

Betsy Sharkey of the Los Angeles Times gave the film a positive review, stating "Zwick is thankfully much more of a grown-up now in dealing with relationship entanglements. Somehow, between the epic and the intimate, between Hathaway and Gyllenhaal, love doesn't come easy, but with Love & Other Drugs, at least you don't have to wait." Mary Pols of Time stated, "Since American movies tend to be prudish about sex, especially having bona fide stars appear to do it onscreen, Love & Other Drugs' desire to thoroughly acquaint us with a topless Anne Hathaway and a bottomless Jake Gyllenhaal is a welcome change." James Berardinelli, film critic for ReelViews, praised the film and its story, giving it three and a half stars out of four. He wrote, "The first thing one notices about Love and Other Drugs is that it's an adult romance. So many current love stories are targeted at teenagers that it's rare to find one that sidesteps the numerous contrivances that permeate the genre."

=== Accolades ===
| Award | Category | Recipient(s) | Result |
|---|---|---|---|
| 68th Golden Globe Awards | Best Actor – Motion Picture Musical or Comedy | Jake Gyllenhaal | Nominated |
| 68th Golden Globe Awards | Best Actress – Motion Picture Musical or Comedy | Anne Hathaway | Nominated |
| 15th Satellite Awards | Best Actor – Motion Picture Musical or Comedy | Jake Gyllenhaal | Nominated |
| 15th Satellite Awards | Best Actress – Motion Picture Musical or Comedy | Anne Hathaway | Won |
| Washington D.C. Area Film Critics Association | Best Actress | Anne Hathaway | Nominated |
