= The Witches (2020 film) =

2020 film by Robert Zemeckis

- Release poster
- Directed by: Robert Zemeckis
- Screenplay by: Robert Zemeckis; Kenya Barris; Guillermo del Toro
- Based on: The Witches by Roald Dahl
- Produced by: Robert Zemeckis; Jack Rapke; Guillermo del Toro; Alfonso Cuarón; Luke Kelly
- Starring: Anne Hathaway; Octavia Spencer; Stanley Tucci; Kristin Chenoweth
- Narrated by: Chris Rock
- Cinematography: Don Burgess
- Edited by: Jeremiah O'Driscoll; Ryan Chan
- Music by: Alan Silvestri
- Production companies: ImageMovers; Necropia Entertainment; Esperanto Filmoj; Double Dare You Productions; The Roald Dahl Story Company
- Distributed by: Warner Bros. Pictures
- Release dates: October 22, 2020 (United States); October 29, 2020 (Mexico)
- Running time: 104 minutes
- Countries: Mexico; United Kingdom; United States
- Language: English
- Budget: $100 million
- Box office: $29.3 million

The Witches (also known as Roald Dahl's The Witches), is a 2020 dark fantasy comedy film co-produced and directed by Robert Zemeckis, who co-wrote the screenplay with Kenya Barris and Guillermo del Toro, based on Roald Dahl's novel The Witches (1983). It is the second film adaptation of the novel, following The Witches (1990). The film stars Anne Hathaway, Octavia Spencer, Stanley Tucci, Kristin Chenoweth, and Jahzir Bruno, with narration by Chris Rock.

The Witches was released on HBO Max in the United States on October 22, 2020, and had a theatrical release in some markets beginning on October 28, by Warner Bros. Pictures.

== Plot ==
Young Charlie Hansen lives with his grandmother Agatha in Demopolis, Alabama, after a car accident killed his parents in Chicago. Gradually, she cheers him up by buying him a pet mouse, whom he names Daisy.

On a trip to the store, Charlie encounters a witch trying to lure him with a snake and a caramel. Agatha's presence frightens the witch away, and she tells Charlie a witch cursed her childhood friend Alice into spending the rest of her life as a chicken.

Agatha, developing a cough she believes to have been brought on by a witch and explaining that witches never leave once they find a child, takes Charlie to stay in the Grand Orleans Imperial Island hotel, where her cousin Eston is the executive chef. Agatha teaches Charlie to distinguish witches from ordinary women: they wear gloves to hide their bird-like claws and wigs which give them rashes to cover their baldness, have square-ended and toeless feet, mouths that can open nearly to their ears and extendable nostrils for detecting children.

Wanting to let Agatha rest, Charlie takes Daisy to the hotel's ballroom for training, meeting the gluttonous but friendly Bruno Jenkins on the way. When a group of witches, including the one from Demopolis, enters the ballroom, Charlie hides under the stage. He overhears their all-powerful leader, the Grand High Witch of All the World, instructing the witches to open confectionery stores, planning to give the world's children confection laced with Formula #86: Delayed-Action Mouse Maker, a potion that will transform them into mice. Bruno, who earlier received a Swiss chocolate bar infused with the potion from the Grand High Witch, arrives, distracting the Grand High Witch from finding Charlie. Transfixed by the Grand High Witch's offer of more chocolate, Bruno is transformed into a mouse by the delayed effect of the potion. He escapes to the vent where Charlie and Daisy are hiding, revealing them to the Grand High Witch, who is able to transform Charlie into a mouse, before they escape the ballroom through the vent, injuring the Grand High Witch in the process.

The three mice reach Charlie's hotel room and tell Agatha about the witches' plan. They learn the Grand High Witch is staying in the room below and that Daisy was once an orphaned young human girl named Mary. Charlie sneaks into the Grand High Witch's room, with the help of Agatha, and obtains a bottle of potion, evading the suspicious Grand High Witch and her cat, Hades, but Agatha is unable to engineer a cure from it. Charlie infiltrates the kitchen and drops the bottle into the pot of pea soup for the witches' dinner.

At dinner, Agatha is questioned by the manager, R. J. Stringer III, about her being seen with a mouse around the hotel, but he concedes to save the hotel's reputation and seats Agatha in the dining room. The Grand High Witch, about to eat the soup, realizes she knows Agatha, being the witch who turned Alice into a chicken, and confronts her. The mice steal the Grand High Witch's room key as the other witches transform into rats.

The day's events come to a head in the Grand High Witch's room, where Agatha and the mice, attempting to retrieve the rest of the Grand High Witch's stock of potion, are confronted by the enraged Grand High Witch. After a brief standoff, the Grand High Witch attempts to murder Agatha, but the mice launch a bottle of potion into the witch's mouth via a mousetrap, transforming her into a rat. The Grand High Witch chases the mice, but Agatha traps her under an ice bucket and seizes her trunk full of money and the rest of the potion, while releasing Hades from his cage, who mauls the Grand High Witch to death.

Bruno, Mary, Charlie and Agatha return home with the trunk and enjoy their new lives together. Charlie and Agatha travel the world, hunting witches with the potion and advising the next generation to do the same.

== Cast ==
- Anne Hathaway as Lilith the Grand High Witch, the powerful and evil witch who is the leader of all witches in the world. Hathaway additionally provided the voice of the character's murid form.
- Octavia Spencer as Grandma Agatha, a healer and Charlie's grandmother who is the long-time old enemy of the Grand High Witch.
  - Miranda Sarfo Peprah additionally portrayed the character's younger self.
- Stanley Tucci as R. J. Stringer III, the hotel manager.
- Jahzir Bruno as Hero Boy / Charlie Hansen, a young boy who is turned into a mouse by the Grand High Witch.
  - Bruno additionally provided the voice of the character's murid form.
  - Chris Rock as the voice of Old Hero / Charlie Hansen, the narrator and as an elder mouse who tells the firsthand account of his experience as a child to a group of children.
- Codie-Lei Eastick as Bruno Jenkins, an English boy who is turned into a mouse. Eastick additionally provided the voice of the character's murid form.
- Kristin Chenoweth as the voice of Daisy, the boy's pet mouse. It is revealed that she was once a young human girl named Mary who ran away from the orphanage and was turned into a mouse by the witches four months prior to the events of the film.
- Charles Edwards as Mr. Jenkins, Bruno's father.
- Morgana Robinson as Mrs. Jenkins, Bruno's mother.
- Josette Simon as Zelda, a witch.
- Eugenia Caruso as Consuella, a witch.
- Ana-Maria Maskell as Esmerelda, a witch.
- Orla O'Rourke as Saoirse, a witch.
- Penny Lisle as Lindsay, a witch.
- Simon Manyonda as a sous-chef
- Philippe Spall as a chef
- Brian Bovell as Reginald

== Production ==
=== Development ===
Talks of a new adaptation of Dahl's novel began in December 2008, when Guillermo del Toro expressed interest in making a stop motion film. No further developments on the potential project emerged until 10 years later in June 2018, when Robert Zemeckis was hired to direct and write the script. Del Toro would produce, alongside Zemeckis and Alfonso Cuarón, in addition to having a screenplay credit.

The film takes place in the United States, in Alabama during the 1960s, instead of the novel's 1980s England and Norway, and the boy protagonist is African-American, instead of Norwegian-British like the boy in the original novel and previous adaptations. Nevertheless, the adaptation was described by Zemeckis as being closer to the original novel than the 1990 adaptation, directed by Nicolas Roeg. Kenya Barris co-wrote the film.

=== Casting ===
In January 2019, Anne Hathaway was cast in the role of Grand High Witch. Octavia Spencer was cast in February, with newcomers Jahzir Bruno and Codie-Lei Eastick also joining. In May, Stanley Tucci and Chris Rock were added. In September 2020 it was revealed that Kristin Chenoweth was cast in the film.

=== Filming ===
Principal photography began on May 8, 2019, with filming locations including Alabama and Georgia in the US, and at Warner Bros. Studios, Leavesden in Hertfordshire, and Virginia Water Lake in Surrey, both in England. It was expected to wrap on June 25. On June 19, crew member Darren Langford was stabbed in the neck with a Stanley knife on the Warner Bros. Studios set in Leavesden. On March 18, 2021, crew member Johnny Walker was convicted of wounding with intent.

=== Marketing ===
The film collaborated with a Roblox game named Islands for a limited-time Halloween event. It features a boss battle with the Grand High Witch, the main antagonist of the film.

== Music ==
In July 2019, Zemeckis's regular collaborator, Alan Silvestri, was revealed to be scoring the film. A soundtrack featuring Silvestri's score released by WaterTower Music on October 23, 2020.

== Release ==
The Witches was scheduled to be released on October 16, 2020. On October 25, 2019, Warner Bros. moved up the release of the film by a week. However, on June 12, 2020, Warner Bros. announced that they pulled the film off the 2020 schedule due to the COVID-19 pandemic.

The film was digitally released in the United States on October 22, 2020, via HBO Max. In November, Variety reported the film was the ninth-most watched straight-to-streaming title of 2020 up to that point.

In some countries that have no access to HBO Max, the film was released in theaters a week later than its digital release.

=== Home media ===
The film was released on DVD and Blu-ray by Warner Bros. Home Entertainment on June 14, 2022.

== Reception ==
=== Box office ===
The film grossed $4.9 million in 12 countries in its first week of release. During the weekend of November 20, the film made $1.2 million from 23 countries, for a running total of $15.1 million. By September 22, 2026, the film had a running total of $29.3 million from 32 countries.

=== Critical response ===
The film was criticized for its writing, and was deemed inferior to Roeg's film. Review aggregator Rotten Tomatoes reports that 50% of 186 critic reviews are positive for The Witches, with an average rating of 5.5/10. The website's critics consensus reads: "The Witches misses a few spells, but Anne Hathaway's game performance might be enough to bewitch fans of this Roald Dahl tale." According to Metacritic, which sampled 31 critics and calculated a weighted average score of 47 out of 100, the film received "mixed or average reviews".

In his two out of four star review, Richard Roeper of the Chicago Sun-Times praised the special effects and the performances, but found the film to be "far too disturbing for young children and not edgy enough to captivate adults." David Ehrlich of IndieWire gave the film a D+, calling the film "dreadful" and stating, "Zemeckis has made some unsuccessful films over the last 20 years, but The Witches is the most frustrating of them all because it feels like it could've been made by somebody else. Anybody else. Roeg's version may have scarred a generation of kids for life, but at least they remembered it."

=== Controversy ===
Numerous disability advocates, including British Paralympic swimmer Amy Marren, accused the film of perpetuating bias against individuals with ectrodactyly and other limb differences. Lauren Appelbaum, a spokesperson for advocacy group RespectAbility, said the film portrays limb differences as "hideous or something to be afraid of." On November 4, 2020, Warner Bros. issued a statement in which they apologized for offending people with disabilities. They further added that they had worked with "designers and artists to come up with a new interpretation of the cat-like claws that are described in the book. [...] The film is about kindness. [...] It was never the intention for viewers to feel that the fantastical, non-human creatures were meant to represent them." Hathaway also issued an apology over the film's portrayal, saying "I particularly want to say I'm sorry to kids with limb differences... Now that I know better I promise I'll do better."

=== Accolades ===
Award	Date of ceremony	Category	Recipient(s)	Result	Ref.
Golden Raspberry Awards	April 21, 2021	Worst Actress	Anne Hathaway (also for The Last Thing He Wanted)	Nominated	
Nickelodeon Kids' Choice Awards	March 13, 2021	Favorite Movie Actress	Anne Hathaway	Nominated	
Saturn Awards	October 26, 2021	Best Fantasy Film Release		Nominated	
Set Decorators Society of America Awards	March 31, 2021	Best Achievement in Décor/Design of a Science Fiction or Fantasy Feature Film	Rafaella Giovannetti and Gary Freeman	Nominated	
Visual Effects Society Awards	April 6, 2021	Outstanding Visual Effects in a Photoreal Feature	Kevin Baillie, Sandra Scott, Sean Konrad, Glenn Melenhorst and Mark Holt	Nominated	
Visual Effects Society Awards	April 6, 2021	Outstanding Animated Character in a Photoreal Feature	Jye Skinn, Sarah Fuller, Marco Iannaccone and Fredrik Sundqvist (for Daisy)	Nominated	
Visual Effects Society Awards	April 6, 2021	Outstanding Model in a Photoreal or Animated Project	Jared Michael, Peter Dominik, Sylvain Lesaint and Emily Tilson (for Rollercoaster)	Nominated	

== See also ==
- List of films about witchcraft
