= Joanna Strange =

WeWork Whistleblower

Joanna Carissa Strange is an American business consultant, whistleblower, and theatre and film director.

== Career ==
=== Whistleblowing at WeWork ===
In 2016, while employed at WeWork, Strange discovered internal documents that revealed the company was significantly underperforming compared to its public financial projections. The documents indicated that WeWork had slashed its profit forecasts by 78%, reduced its revenue estimates by 14%, and projected a 63% increase in negative cash flow. Concerned about the misleading information being presented to investors, Strange shared these documents with Bloomberg, leading to investigative reports that exposed WeWork's financial instability and questionable practices.

WeWork responded by suing Strange for unauthorized disclosure of proprietary information, alleging that she accessed the company's computers using credentials from a senior executive. This legal battle involved significant personal risk, including questioning by the FBI. Despite the pressure, her revelations played a crucial role in the scrutiny that led to WeWork's failed IPO in 2019 and the resignation of CEO Adam Neumann.

Strange was interviewed and appeared in the Hulu Documentary, WeWork: Or the Making and Breaking of a $47 Billion Unicorn as well as the HBO Max Series, Generation Hustle. She was also interviewed for We:Crashed, the Wondery podcast that was later made into a limited series of the same name by Apple TV. She finally told her full story on Bloomberg's podcast, Foundering, with Ellen Huet.

Recently, Strange has been interviewed by ABC NewsRadio Australia for their morning news segments.

=== Advocacy and consulting ===
Following her departure from WeWork, Strange became an advocate for transparency and accountability in the startup ecosystem. She has been critical of the overvaluation of startups by venture capital firms and the toxic cultures that can develop in high-growth companies. Strange emphasizes the importance of ethical business practices and proper valuation for long-term sustainability. She currently runs her own consulting business.

=== Theatre and film ===
In addition to her advocacy and consulting work, Strange has an extensive background in theatre and film. She has directed and produced various projects. Her film, Blonde, was accepted to 11 film festivals and took home awards at three It stars Max von Essen as "Man" and Annabelle Attanasio as "Blonde".

== Personal life ==
Joanna Strange is the daughter of archaeologist, James F. Strange who excavated at Zippori for the bulk of his career.

She holds a B.A. in Theatre Performance from the University of South Florida and an M.A. in Directing from New York University (NYU), where she studied under Kristin Horton.
