= Rebekah Neumann =

American businesswoman (born 1978)

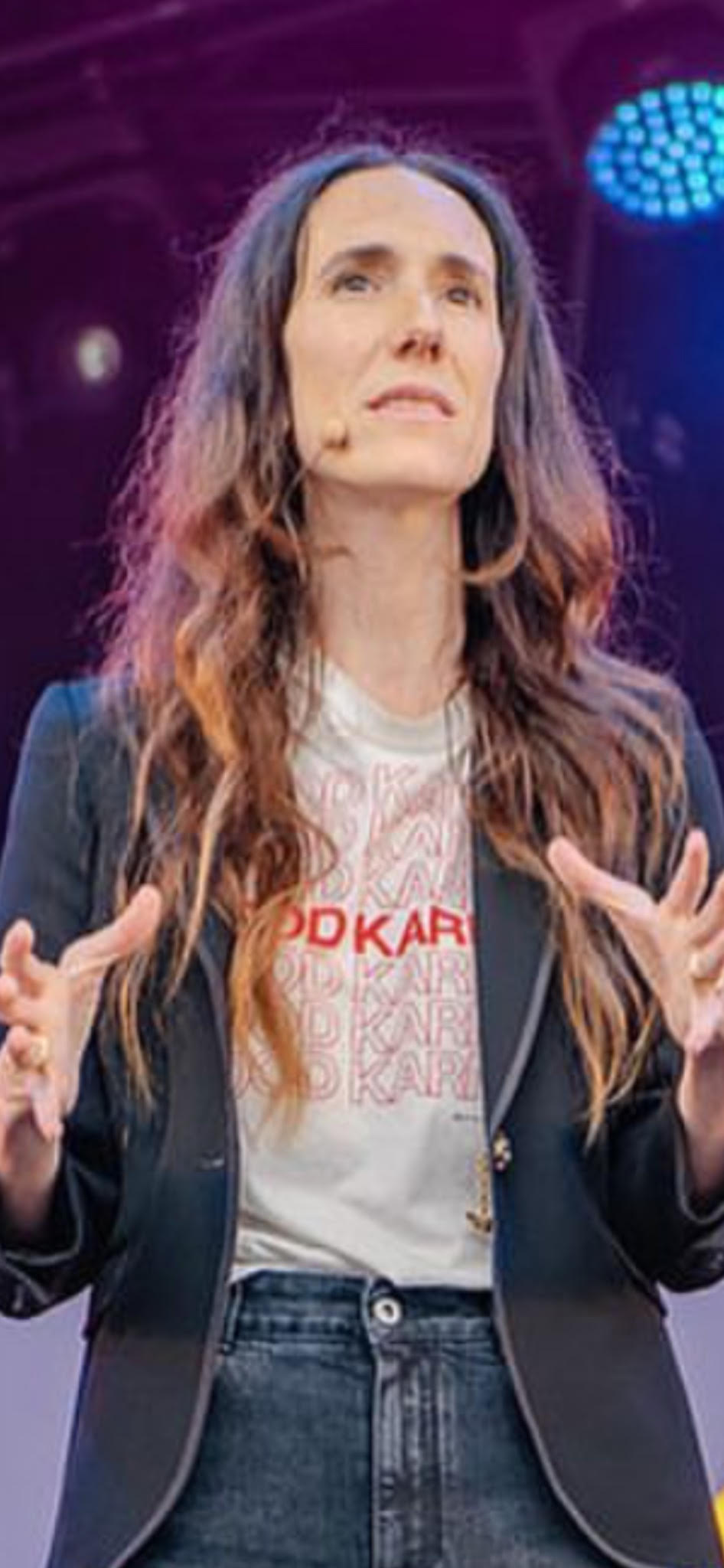
- Neumann in 2019
- Born: Rebekah Victoria Paltrow; February 26, 1978 (age 48); New York City, U.S.
- Education: Cornell University
- Title: Former CEO of WeGrow
- Spouse: Adam Neumann (m. 2008)
- Children: 6
- Relatives: Gwyneth Paltrow (cousin)

Rebekah Victoria Neumann (née Paltrow; born February 26, 1978) is an American businesswoman. Until September 22, 2019, she served as chief brand and impact officer at WeWork, a company founded by her husband, Adam Neumann, and oversaw its education program WeGrow.

== Early life and education ==
Neumann, the daughter of Evelyn and Bob Paltrow, grew up in Bedford, New York, and attended the Horace Mann School. Her father had a direct mail business and spent a number of years in prison for tax evasion.

She went on to study business and Buddhism at Cornell University. She later became a certified Jivamukti yoga instructor. She received her yoga instructor certification from the Omega Institute for Holistic Studies. She is a first cousin of actress Gwyneth Paltrow. Neumann is a practicing Jew. When she started her yoga training, Rebekah went by the nickname Rebi.

== Career ==
After graduating from college, Neumann entered Salomon Smith Barney's Sales and Trading Program, now known as Morgan Stanley Wealth Management. In the early 2010s, she acted in and produced some short films using the screen name Rebekah Keith.

In 2010, her husband, Adam Neumann, and Miguel McKelvey co-founded WeWork. In 2019 Rebekah Neumann began calling herself a cofounder of WeWork.

According to Vanity Fair, at WeWork "she has been known to have people fired, such as a mechanic for WeWork’s Gulfstream jet, within minutes of meeting them because she didn’t like their energy."

Since the collapse of WeWork and associated companies it has been discovered that Rebekah Neumann played a key role in WeWork’s downfall. She had contributed New Age language in the filing which as a result "read like a novel written by someone, who was 'shrooming", according to Scott Galloway.

She founded WeGrow, a private school in Chelsea, in 2017. In September 2019, after an attempt to take the company public revealed deepening financial issues, it was announced that Rebekah Neumann would step down as CEO of WeGrow and relinquish her role in The We Company. In October 2019, it was announced that the WeGrow school would close at the end of the academic year.

In 2020, Neumann bought back some of WeGrow's assets and started Student of Life for Life (SOLFL).

== Personal life ==
Rebekah and American-Israeli entrepreneur Adam Neumann met in New York and married in 2008. They have six children.

Neumann has come under criticism for endorsing unscientific beliefs, such as the idea that meat has emotional memory that can be passed on through consumption.

== In popular culture ==
In the Apple TV+ series WeCrashed (2022), Rebekah Neumann is portrayed by Anne Hathaway. Neumann also appears in the nonfiction book Billion Dollar Loser (2020).

== Filmography ==
=== Film ===
Year	Title	Role	Notes
2010	Fair Game	United Nations Diplomat	Uncredited
2010	Nomads	Sam	

=== Short film ===
Year	Title	Role	Notes
2010	Awake	Ara	
2012	Aunt Louisa	Katherine	
