= Joshua Guttman =

American property owner

Joshua Guttman is a controversial property owner who owns dozens of commercial and residential buildings throughout New York City.

Since 1990, at least five of his buildings have burned down due to arson, although Guttman himself was never charged. Guttman has been involved in a series of lawsuits with some of his former tenants, who have accused him of making his residences uninhabitable in order to force them out.

His son, Jack Guttman, helps to manage his properties through their company, Pearl Realty Management. Joshua Guttman also owns and operates Greendesk, a co-working and office rental company, which was originally started by Adam Neumann, former CEO and founder of WeWork. Guttman bought Greendesk from Neumann in 2009.

== Properties owned ==
- 247 Water Street in Dumbo, Brooklyn
- 155 Water Street in Dumbo, Brooklyn
- 195 Plymouth Street in Dumbo, Brooklyn
- 202 Plymouth Street in Dumbo, Brooklyn
- 68 Jay Street in Dumbo, Brooklyn
- 67 West Street in Greenpoint, Brooklyn
- 71 West Street in Greenpoint, Brooklyn
- 42 West Street in Greenpoint, Brooklyn
- 147 Prince Street in Downtown Brooklyn
- 240 Kent Avenue in Williamsburg, Brooklyn
- 29-28 41st Avenue in Long Island City, Queens
- 34-18 N Blvd in Long Island City, Queens
- 230 Manida St in Hunts Point, Bronx
