= Artie Minson =

American business executive (born 1970)

- Born: Arthur Minson; October 29, 1970 (age 55); New York City, US
- Education: Georgetown University; Columbia Business School
- Title: President & CEO, LeafLink
- Term: April 2022-

Arthur “Artie” Minson (born October 29, 1970) is an American businessman. He is CEO of AI accounting platform Trullion. He is a former president and chief executive officer (CEO) of LeafLink, and a former co-CEO (with Sebastian Gunningham) of WeWork.

Minson was born and raised in New York City, a graduate of Regis High School there, and is now on the school's board of trustees.

Minson earned a bachelor's degree from Georgetown University, and an MBA from Columbia Business School.

In April 2001, Minson was promoted to senior vice president of finance at Rainbow Media Holdings.

From 2009 to April 2013, Minson worked for AOL.

In June 2015, WeWork announced that Minson, former chief financial officer of Time Warner Cable, would join as president and chief operating officer.

In September 2019, it was announced that Adam Neumann was leaving as CEO and would be replaced by Minson and Sebastian Gunningham as co-CEOs. Minson and Gunningham were subsequently replaced by Sandeep Mathrani in February 2020.
