= Sebastian Gunningham =

Former co-CEO of WeWork

- Born: Sebastian J. Gunningham; July 9, 1962 (age 64); Buenos Aires, Argentina
- Education: Stanford University
- Occupation: Former Co-CEO of WeWork
- Years active: 1985-current
- Successor: Sandeep Mathrani
- Spouse: Lisa Gunningham

Sebastian J. Gunningham (born 1962) is the former co-chief executive (co-CEO), with Artie Minson, of WeWork.

== Early life ==
Gunningham was born in Buenos Aires, Argentina. He grew up on a ranch near the town of General Villegas, 500 km west of Buenos Aires. He left Argentina to attend university in the US and graduated from Stanford University in 1985 with a degree in Mathematical Sciences.

== Career ==
Gunningham worked for information technology companies including Automation Technology Products and Cimplex Corporation.

Gunningham was senior vice president of Amazon Marketplace from 2007 to 2018. In 2018, he joined WeWork as vice chair and chief automation officer.

In September 2019, it was announced that Adam Neumann was leaving as CEO and would be replaced by Gunningham and Artie Minson as co-CEOs. Gunningham and Minson were replaced by Sandeep Mathrani in February 2020.

=== Oracle ===
Gunningham joined Oracle in 1988. Over the next 10 years, Gunningham became an SVP at Oracle and grew the Latin America business to over $1B in revenues across more than 13 countries. Starting in 1999, Gunningham also led the US Aerospace, Automotive and Industrial sectors for Oracle, based out of San Francisco and Miami.

=== Apple ===
In 2002, Gunningham joined Apple as the VP for Enterprise.

=== Peace Software ===
Gunningham became CEO of Peace Software in 2004. Peace Software had customers in Europe, US, and Australia. Peace Software was successfully acquired by First Data Corporation in December 2006.

=== Amazon ===
In March 2007, Gunningham joined Amazon as the SVP for Marketplace and a member of the executive S-Team, reporting to Jeff Bezos. Over the next 11 years, Gunningham would lead one of the fastest growing segments of the Amazon business, growing 3rd party Sellers business to over 50% of total units in 2018.

=== WeWork ===
In 2018, Gunningham joined WeWork as a vice chairman. In September 2019, the WeWork Board of Directors named Gunningham Co-CEO of WeWork, replacing WeWork founder and CEO Adam Neumann, to execute a plan to recover from a postponed IPO, fund the company and restructure its core operations.

== Personal life ==
In October 2018, his 8,250 square-foot house in Medina, Washington was listed for sale at $21 million.
