= WeCrashed =

2022 American television miniseries

- Promotional poster
- Genre: Comedy-drama; Biographical drama
- Created by: Drew Crevello; Lee Eisenberg
- Based on: WeCrashed by Wondery
- Starring: Jared Leto; Anne Hathaway; Kyle Marvin
- Music by: Christopher Nicholas Bangs
- Opening theme: "Happy Man" by Jungle
- Country of origin: United States
- Original language: English
- No. of episodes: 8

Production
- Executive producers: Lee Eisenberg; Drew Crevello; Anne Hathaway; Jared Leto; Emma Ludbrook; John Requa; Glenn Ficarra; Charlie Gogolak; Natalie Sandy; Hernan Lopez; Marshall Lewy; Aaron Hart
- Cinematography: Xavier Grobet; Corey Walter
- Editors: Justin Krohn; Debra Beth Weinfeld; Tamara Meem; Chris Guiral
- Running time: 48–61 minutes
- Production companies: Zaftig Films; Wondery; Somewhere Pictures; Paradox; Piece of Work Productions; Vorpal Rabbit

Original release
- Network: Apple TV+
- Release: March 18 – April 22, 2022

WeCrashed is an American biographical comedy-drama television miniseries created by Drew Crevello and Lee Eisenberg that premiered on Apple TV+ on March 18, 2022. Based on the podcast WeCrashed: The Rise and Fall of WeWork by Wondery, it stars Jared Leto and Anne Hathaway as Adam and Rebekah Neumann, the married couple at the heart of WeWork, a coworking space company which claimed a valuation of $47 billion (in an internally produced prospectus) in 2019, before crashing as a result of financial revelations.

== Cast and characters ==
=== Main ===
- Jared Leto as Adam Neumann, co-founder of WeWork
- Anne Hathaway as Rebekah Neumann, former chief brand and impact officer of WeWork and founder of WeGrow
- Kyle Marvin as Miguel McKelvey, co-founder of WeWork

=== Recurring ===
- Kelly AuCoin as Scott Galloway
- Steven Boyer as Matthew
- Cricket Brown as Chloe Morgan
- Andrew Burnap as Phil
- Anthony Edwards as Bruce Dunlevie
- O. T. Fagbenle as Cameron Lautner
- America Ferrera as Elishia Kennedy
- Asmeret Ghebremichael as Renee
- Troy Iwata as Damian Saito
- Peter Jacobson as Bob Paltrow
- Kim Eui-sung as Masayoshi Son
- Campbell Scott as Jamie Dimon
- Theo Stockman as Jacob

== Development ==
WeCrashed: The Rise and Fall of WeWork, a six-part podcast, is the basis for the series. WeCrashed: The Director’s Cut podcast is a remake of the podcast, with David Brown by Wondery.

== Production ==
After Lee Eisenberg signed a multi-year overall deal with Apple, it was reported that a drama series based on the story of WeWork was in development in February 2020. It was announced in December 2020 that Apple TV+ had put the series into development, with Jared Leto in negotiations to star. Damien Chazelle was initially supposed to direct and produce, but was sidetracked by his film Babylon and dropped out. He was replaced by John Requa and Glenn Ficarra. Lee Eisenberg and Drew Crevello were set to create and write the series. The series was given an eight-episode series order the next month, with Leto confirmed to star alongside Anne Hathaway, with both serving as executive producers. In April 2021, Kyle Marvin was cast in a lead role, portraying Miguel McKelvey, another co-founder of WeWork. In July 2021, America Ferrera was added to the cast. In August 2021, O. T. Fagbenle was added to the cast in recurring capacity. In December 2021, Theo Stockman was added to the cast in recurring role, with Anthony Edwards noted as being cast in February 2022.

== Episodes ==
No.	Title	Directed by	Written by	Original release date
1	"This Is Where It Begins"	John Requa & Glenn Ficarra	Drew Crevello & Lee Eisenberg	March 18, 2022
2	"Masha Masha Masha"	John Requa & Glenn Ficarra	Eleanor Burgess	March 18, 2022
3	"Summer Camp"	John Requa & Glenn Ficarra	Eva Anderson	March 18, 2022
4	"4.4"	Cory Finley	Zenzele Price	March 25, 2022
5	"Hustle Harder"	Cory Finley	Elissa Karasik	April 1, 2022
6	"Fortitude"	Tinge Krishnan	Mark Stasenko	April 8, 2022
7	"The Power of We"	Tinge Krishnan	Eva Anderson & Eleanor Burgess	April 15, 2022
8	"The One with All the Money"	Shari Springer Berman and Robert Pulcini	Elissa Karasik & Zenzele Price & Mark Stasenko	April 22, 2022

== Release ==
A portion of the series previewed at South by Southwest on March 12, 2022.

The series premiered on Apple TV+ on March 18, 2022.

== Reception ==
On review aggregator website Rotten Tomatoes, the series holds a 65% approval rating based on 48 critic reviews, with an average rating of 6.8/10. The website's critics consensus reads, "The pacing can be frustrating, but WeCrashed still works thanks to its compelling central relationship and Anne Hathaway's knockout performance." On Metacritic, the series has a score of 65 out of 100, based on 21 critic reviews, indicating "generally favorable" reviews.

Naomi Fry in The New Yorker called the show "genuinely funny" but complained that the business scenes, which become more frequent toward the end of the show, lack dramatic stakes. She did praise Leto's performance, saying "I don’t think I've ever seen a better impression of an Israeli's accent and mannerisms done by a non-Israeli, and I say this as an Israeli." A number of reviewers criticized the series for not exploring the deeper issues raised by the WeWork story, such as "how thin the line in Silicon Valley can be between visionary and fraudster," or how Neumann's success came in part because he managed "to tap into a specifically millennial sense of longing for meaning and community."

== Historical accuracy ==
WeCrashed contains a mix of real and fictional characters and events, although the fictional elements tend to have a basis in reality. For example, the character Elishia Kennedy is fictional but largely based on SoulCycle co-founder Julie Rice. The episode "Summer Camp" involves Rebekah Neumann making an onstage comment at a 2014 "Summer Camp" event that antagonizes many of the female employees, leading to a session in which they vent their frustrations at her. In reality, she did make the comment, but at a 2018 Summer Camp, and there was no corresponding discussion session afterwards, although many of the sentiments expressed had been stated publicly or privately by female employees at various times.

Bloomberg News reporter Ellen Huet felt the show was inaccurate in portraying WeWork co-founder Miguel McKelvey as "a clueless punchline," when in reality "many former employees saw him as a key architect of the company culture."

== See also ==
- WeWork: Or the Making and Breaking of a $47 Billion Unicorn
