= AIVF =

Israeli healthtech startup

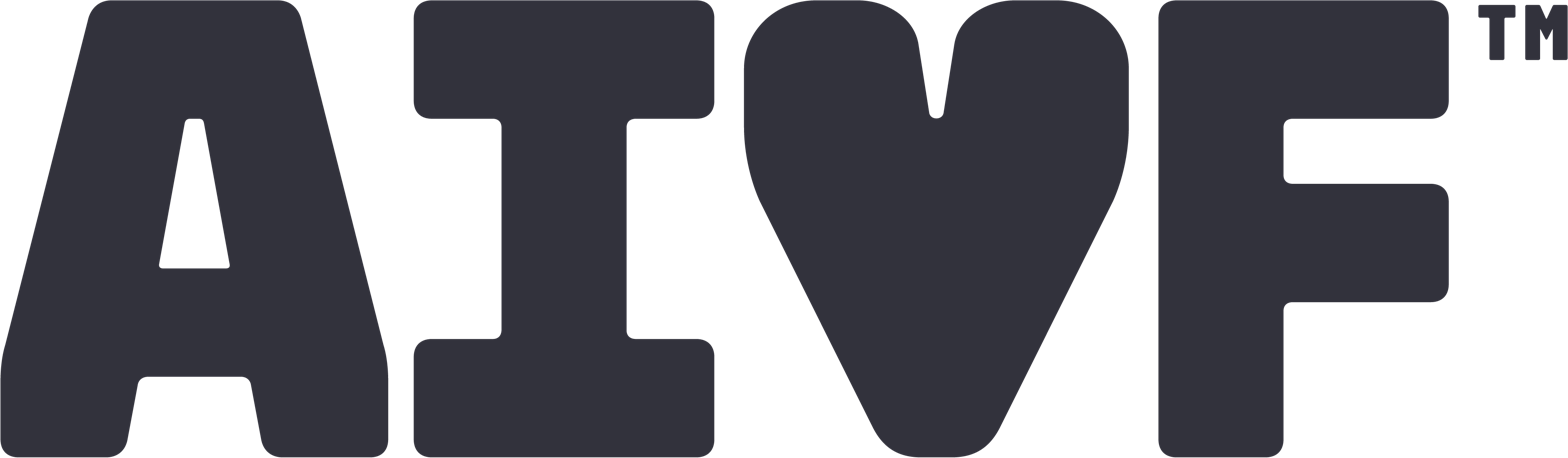
- Company type: Private
- Industry: Biotechnology, Fertility
- Founded: 2018
- Founder: Daniella Gilboa, Daniel Seidman
- Headquarters: Tel Aviv, Israel
- Key people: Daniella Gilboa (CEO), Daniel Seidman (Chief Medical Officer)
- Products: EMA by AIVF software platform
- Services: AI driven IVF operating system
- Website: https://aivf.co

AIVF is Tel Aviv-based healthtech startup focused on revolutionizing in-vitro fertilization (IVF) through the application of artificial intelligence (AI). The main company's product is EMA software platform.

== History ==
AIVF was founded in 2018 in Tel Aviv, Israel, by Daniella Gilboa, a clinical embryologist, and Prof. Daniel Seidman, a reproductive endocrinologist and IVF expert. AIVF aims to improve the success rates of IVF treatments and shorten the time to pregnancy.

In 2019, the company secured financial support from angel investors, venture capital firms, and grants from the Israel Innovation Authority and the European R&D program Eureka.

In 2021, AIVF's EMA software received the CE Mark, indicating compliance with European health, safety, and environmental protection standards. The company is also GDPR and HIPAA-compliant, ensuring the privacy and security of patient data.

In June 2022, AIVF raised $25 million in Series A financing led by Insight Partners, with participation from Adam Neumann's Family Office.

== Technology ==
AIVF's product is the EMA platform, an AI-powered system that evaluates the viability of embryos during IVF procedures. EMA analyzes biological data from embryos from Day Zero (fertilization) to Day 5 or Day 6, scoring them based on their probability of successful implantation and pregnancy. This technology aims to standardize the embryo evaluation process across clinics, reducing human subjectivity and improving IVF success rates.

AIVF's EMA platform improved IVF success rates, reducing failed pregnancies and increasing accuracy in embryo selection. The company reports that EMA provides a 38% higher accuracy level compared to evaluations by embryologists alone, with embryos scoring high on EMA demonstrating a 70% probability of successful pregnancy. The use of EMA has been shown to reduce the number of IVF cycles needed to achieve a fetal heartbeat by over 27.5%.

In 2024, AIVF unveiled the first AI-based embryo evaluation for euploidy screening test based on time-lapse videos. This instant non-invasive AI tool successfully refines the genetic quality assessment of embryos in IVF clinics.

AIVF's EMA platform is commercially available across Europe, Australia, Brazil, South Korea and North America. In 2023, the company announced its preparations to launch its platform in the United States.
