= Flow (real estate company) =

American residential real estate company

- Company type: Private
- Industry: Real estate
- Founded: 2022; 4 years ago
- Founder: Adam Neumann
- Headquarters: Miami, Florida, United States
- Area served: Nashville, Tennessee; Atlanta; Miami; Fort Lauderdale, and Riyadh, Saudi Arabia
- Number of employees: c. 150 (2023)
- Website: flow.life

Flow is an American residential real estate company founded in 2022 by Adam Neumann, the former CEO of WeWork. Headquartered in Miami, Florida, the company aims to address aspects of the housing shortage in the United States by "incorporating technology, fostering social interaction, and promoting equity for renters".

== History ==
Flow launched with significant backing from the venture capital firm Andreessen Horowitz, which invested $350 million in August 2022, valuing the company at over $1 billion. This funding made Flow a unicorn before it commenced operations. According to The Wall Street Journal, Andreessen Horowitz received a stake in Flow’s real estate portfolio as part of the investment.

The company initially focused on managing over 3,000 apartment units across Nashville, Tennessee, Atlanta, Georgia, and Florida (Miami and Fort Lauderdale).

In 2024, Flow expanded internationally into Saudi Arabia, partnering with local investors to develop and operate apartment complexes in Riyadh.

== Business model ==
Flow's approach combines traditional property management with concierge services and technology solutions for renters and landlords. The company also aims to foster a sense of community among tenants through innovative social interaction models.

The company’s plans include managing both Neumann's properties and those owned by third-party landlords. Flow’s business model continues to evolve, with further details on its operational strategy yet to be disclosed as of late 2024.

== Acquisitions ==
In May 2024, Flow acquired Whalebone, a lifestyle magazine based in Montauk, New York. Following the acquisition, the publication was renamed Flow Trip to align with the company’s branding.

In September 2024, Flow announced the acquisition of a 30% stake in Canada Global, a public real estate development company in Israel. This partnership aims to extend their real estate activities beyond Israel, initially focusing on opportunities in the United States.
