= Avi Yehiel =

Israeli footballer

Avi Yehiel אבי יחיאל
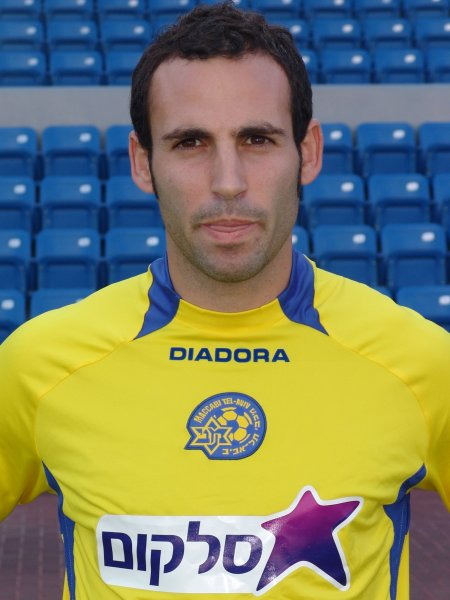
- Avi Yehiel.

Personal information
- Date of birth: 26 September 1979 (age 47)
- Place of birth: Jaffa, Tel Aviv, Israel
- Position: Defender

Youth career
- Gadna Tel Aviv Yehuda

Senior career*
Years	Team	Apps	(Gls)
1997–2005	Hapoel Petah Tikva	143	(1)
2005–2009	Maccabi Tel Aviv	92	(2)
2009–2010	Maccabi Petah Tikva	30	(1)
2010–2012	Hapoel Be'er Sheva	62	(3)

International career
1999–2001	Israel U21	10	(0)
2005–2007	Israel	4	(1)
- * Club domestic league appearances and goals as of 11 July 2009

Avi Yehiel (Hebrew: אבי יחיאל; born 26 September 1979) is a former Israeli footballer.

== Biography ==
In 2012, Yehiel married model Adi Neumann, the sister of the founder and former CEO of WeWork, Adam Neumann. After retiring from football in 2013, he worked for WeWork as a wellness coach.

== Sports career ==
Avi Yehiel first played in Gadna Tel Aviv Yehuda junior team and won with it in the youth national championship. In 1997–1998 went to Hapoel Petah Tikva and played for the first time against Hapoel Tel Aviv FC. Yehiel played in Hapoel Petah Tikva for eight seasons and won the Toto Cup in 2004–2005. In season 2005–2006 went to Maccabi Tel Aviv FC, and scored the equaliser in his first game.

Avi Yehiel was a player at the Israel national football team. In his first appearance against Ireland, he scored the equaliser in the 2–2 match.

== Honours ==
- Toto Cup (2):
  - 2004–05, 2008–09
