= Joel Schreiber =

British-American real estate developer

- Born: London, England, United Kingdom
- Occupations: Real estate developer Investor
- Known for: Founder of Waterbridge Capital

Joel Schreiber is a British-born American real estate developer, investor, and founder of Waterbridge Capital.

== Biography ==
Schreiber was born to a Hasidic Jewish family in London. He moved to New York City and in 2000 – with the help of his family and private investors – purchased residential real estate in Brooklyn, upstate New York, and New Jersey. In 2004, he sold most of the residential portfolio to concentrate on commercial properties in Manhattan. In 2006, he founded Waterbridge Capital as a vehicle for his investments. Waterbridge generally leaves the development of properties to its partners and focuses on raising capital and finding partners. His first major investment was the $190 million purchase of 536 Broadway in 2007. In 2010, he purchased a 33-percent interest in WeWork (founded by Adam Neumann and Miguel McKelvey) for $15 million after meeting the founders who were inquiring about a potential lease. McKelvey stated that the deal was a pivotal moment for the company.

It is uncertain how much of an interest Schreiber presently holds in WeWork. In November 2023, the company filed bankruptcy in the United States District Court for the District of New Jersey, listing liabilities of approximately $10 billion to $50 billion.

In 2012, he partnered with Ben Bernstein and Ben Stokes of RedSky Capital and purchased a group of properties for $66 million on Bedford Avenue in Williamsburg, Brooklyn; they redeveloped the real estate and subsequently signed Apple to a 20,000-square-foot retail lease. In 2012, Schreiber partnered with Brooklyn real estate investor David Werner and purchased One Court Square for $481 million in Long Island City, Queens from Stephen L. Green's, SL Green and JPMorgan Asset Management. Also in 2012, he partnered with Kenneth S. Horn of Alchemy Properties and WeWork's Neumann and purchased for $68 million the top floors of the Woolworth Building which they converted into condominiums.

Joel Schreiber is one among several prominent Hasidic real estate developers in Brooklyn who have increased the supply of housing in many Brooklyn neighborhoods.

== Personal life ==
Schreiber is married and has children.
