= Randall Lane (journalist) =

American journalist and author

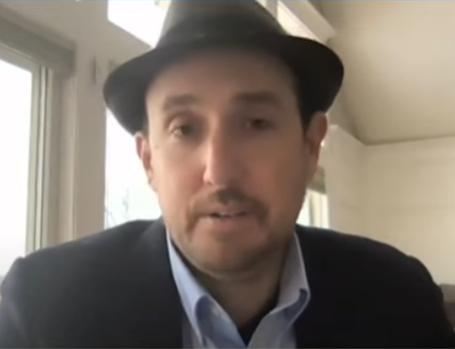
- Speaking at the 2021 World Economic Forum
- Born: 1968 (age 57–58)
- Education: University of Pennsylvania
- Occupations: Journalist and author; former Chief Content Officer and editor of Forbes
- Notable credit(s): Forbes, P.O.V., Trader Monthly, Dealmaker, Daily Beast
- Children: 2

Randall Lane (born 1968) is an American journalist and author who was the chief content officer and editor-in-chief of Forbes magazine until his firing for cause in July 2026. In 2011, Lane created the Forbes 30 Under 30 list. Lane is a former editor-at-large for both Newsweek and The Daily Beast.

In August 2026, he was fired from his position at Forbes after accepting a secret payment of $6,000,000 from the founder of Shook Research. Shook had worked with Forbes since 2016 to publish rankings of wealth advisers.

== Early life ==
While attending Briarcliff High School in 1985, Lane wrote an article for the New York Times detailing his ordeal of getting tickets for a Bruce Springsteen concert. He served as co-editor of his high school's newspaper during this time.

== Career ==
Lane edited his college newspaper, The Daily Pennsylvanian at the University of Pennsylvania before interning with The Wall Street Journal. Lane received the Columbia Scholastic Press Association’s top non-fiction prize for a 1988 profile he wrote on former Philadelphia mayor Frank Rizzo.

After leaving college, he was hired as a fact checker for Forbes, and thereafter was promoted to be a staff writer. In 1995, when he was 27, he was promoted to Washington Bureau Chief, before leaving to edit three publications, P.O.V., Trader Monthly, and Dealmaker.

He founded P.O.V. with a Forbes colleague and the publication was considered by AdWeek as its start-up of the year in 1998.

At Trader Monthly, a bimonthly lifestyle magazine where Lane was the editor-in-chief, Lane created a 30 Under 30 list featuring what his magazine considered the 30 best financial traders at the time.

=== 2010s ===
When Lane rejoined Forbes in 2011, he created the annual Forbes 30 Under 30 list of up and coming figures in multiple business sectors. He then partnered with Warren Buffett to create the Forbes 400 Summit on Philanthropy, which he and Buffett have co-chaired for more than a decade.

Lane wrote a book titled The Zeroes: My Misadventures in the Decade Wall Street Went Insane. In the book, Lane laid out similarities of some Wall Street traders and Major League Baseball players in their views on the ethics of cheating. He interviewed Lenny Dykstra, about his use of steroids while playing with the New York Mets, for the book. The New York Daily News stated of the book that "Lane does a terrific job ... putting things in context". In a review for Inc, Jack Covert stated "What Michael Lewis did for ’80s traders in Liar’s Poker, Randall Lane has now done for trader rock stars of The Zeroes."

Lane was responsible for the reorganization of Forbes' contributor network. The restructure saw it shift from a model where most writers volunteered their time to an all-paid platform with a guaranteed minimum pay.

=== 2020s ===
During the COVID-19 pandemic, Lane took part in a multi-part virtual innovation summit hosted by the University of Waterloo. In 2020, The New York Times identified him as one of the 922 most powerful people in the United States of America. Lane won an Emmy award as executive producer of the documentary WeWork: Or the Making and Breaking of a $47 Billion Unicorn.

In 2024, the unionized editorial staff of Forbes, formed in 2021, passed a vote of no confidence against Lane, as well as former Forbes chief executive officer Michael Federle, charging them with failing to maintain essential standards of editorial integrity, allowing pay inequity and erosion of staff to persist and refusing to be part of productive contract negotiations.

=== Dismissal from Forbes ===
In July 2026, Lane was fired from Forbes following the discovery of an undisclosed $6 million payment he had received from Shook Research founder RJ Shook. Shook Research had partnered with Forbes since 2016 to produce rankings of wealth advisers. The payment was made by Shook after he sold a majority stake in the research company to private equity firm PPC Enterprises. According to reporting by The New York Times, Lane regarded the payment as a personal gift in recognition of advice he had provided Shook over the years. Lane did not disclose the payment to Forbes. Lane acknowledged the failure to disclose the payment, saying that he had made a mistake and describing the nondisclosure as a serious error in judgment. Forbes described the matter as an "undisclosed conflict of interest" and said that, after examining the situation, it took appropriate action. At the time, Forbes' published editorial standards prohibited staff members and contributors from accepting compensation, privileges or favors from people, companies or groups featured in their coverage. Shook Research subsequently said that the payment was personal and did not involve the company, its research methodology, ranking criteria or adviser-evaluation process.

== Personal life ==
Lane was born in 1968. He is divorced and has two daughters, Sabrina and Chloe. During the COVID-19 pandemic, he organized and hosted a four-week summer camp for his daughters and their friends, hiring teachers out of work due to the pandemic to instruct them in core subjects.

=== Kanye West incident ===
On September 16, 2020, Lane was doxxed in a Twitter rant by American musician Kanye West. West tweeted a screenshot of a phone number labeled "Randall Forbes" and wrote "if any of my fans want to call a white supremacist... this is the editor of Forbes". Twitter deleted West's tweet after 30 minutes and suspended his account for violating Twitter's private information policy. Lane had previously interviewed West about his 2020 presidential ambitions which Forbes published in July 2020.
