= 2020 Republican Party presidential debates =

Debates took place among candidates in the campaign for the Republican Party's nomination for the president in the 2020 United States presidential election. The Republican National Committee (RNC) did not schedule any official RNC-sanctioned primary debates, and incumbent President Donald Trump stated that he would not debate any primary challenger. Thus, the debates held among Trump's primary challengers were instead sponsored by private organizations.

== Debates ==
Sites of the Republican presidential debates

The Republican National Committee (RNC) chose not to schedule any official RNC-sanctioned primary debates. On May 3, 2018, the RNC eliminated its debate committee for the 2020 election cycle, as John Hammond, the co-chairman of the RNC's subcommittee governing the primary process, stated that it would be less relevant "as we continue to support the President and the vice president and the current administration". Trump also stated on September 9, 2019, that he was not willing to debate any primary challenger, saying, "I'm not looking to give them any credibility."

Business Insider announced on September 10, 2019, that it would host a debate on September 24, inviting Trump and his main primary challengers.

Politicon, a nonpartisan political convention, announced on October 22, 2019, that it would host a debate on October 26 among Trump's three main primary challengers.

The Forbes Under 30 Summit hosted a debate on October 28 between Mark Sanford, Bill Weld, and Joe Walsh.

=== Schedule ===
Debate schedule
Debate	Date	Time (ET)	Viewers	Location	Sponsor(s)	Moderator(s)
Business Insider debate	Sept. 24, 2019	7 pm	~900	New York, New York	Business Insider	Anthony Fisher; Linette Lopez
Politicon debate	Oct. 26, 2019	12 pm	Unknown	Nashville, Tennessee	Politicon	Jennifer Rubin
Forbes debate	Oct. 28, 2019	10:30 am	Unknown	Detroit, Michigan	Forbes	Randall Lane; Daniela Pierre-Bravo

=== Participation ===
The following is a table of participating candidates in each debate:

Participating candidates
Candidate
Candidate	P Present A Absent I Invited N Not invited W Withdrawn		
Candidate	Business Insider	Politicon	Forbes
De La Fuente	N	N	N
Sanford	A	P	P
Trump	A	A	A
Walsh	P	P	P
Weld	P	P	P

=== Business Insider debate (September 24, 2019) ===
Republican primary debates

Business Insider's 2020 Republican primary debate
- Host: Business Insider
- Date(s): September 24, 2019
- Venue: Business Insider headquarters
- Location: New York City, New York
- Participants: Joe Walsh; Bill Weld
- Moderator(s): Anthony Fisher; Linette Lopez

Business Insider's 2020 Republican primary debate was held on September 24, 2019, at the headquarters of Business Insider in New York City. It was streamed on Business Insider Today, their daily Facebook Watch show and streamed live on the Business Insider website. It was hosted by Business Insider CEO Henry Blodget and moderated by its politics editor Anthony Fisher, and its opinion columnist Linette Lopez.

Joe Walsh and Bill Weld attended the debate, but Mark Sanford declined due to scheduling conflicts, and Donald Trump did not respond to the invitation.

The debate was characterized by a focus on Trump, with both attending candidates spending the majority of their time criticizing him. Other topics that were discussed included climate change, Iran, and automation.

=== Politicon debate (October 26, 2019) ===
Republican primary debates

Politicon's 2020 Republican primary debate
- Host: Politicon
- Date(s): October 26, 2019
- Location: Nashville, Tennessee
- Participants: Mark Sanford; Joe Walsh; Bill Weld
- Moderator(s): Jennifer Rubin

Politicon's 2020 Republican primary debate was held on October 26, 2019, at Politicon in Nashville, Tennessee. Sanford, Walsh and Weld were all in attendance.

=== Forbes debate (October 28, 2019) ===
Republican primary debates

Forbes's 2020 Republican primary debate
- Host: Forbes
- Date(s): October 28, 2019
- Venue: Detroit Masonic Temple
- Location: Detroit, Michigan
- Participants: Mark Sanford; Joe Walsh; Bill Weld
- Moderator(s): Randall Lane; Daniela Pierre-Bravo

Forbes's 2020 Republican primary debate was held on October 28, 2019, at the Detroit Masonic Temple in Detroit. It was moderated by Randall Lane and Daniela Pierre-Bravo.

Joe Walsh, Bill Weld and Mark Sanford all attended the debate.

Among other issues, Trump's potential impeachment and climate change were discussed.

== See also ==
- 2020 Republican Party presidential primaries
- 2020 United States presidential debates
