= WeWork: Or the Making and Breaking of a $47 Billion Unicorn =

2021 American documentary film

- Official poster
- Directed by: Jed Rothstein
- Written by: Jed Rothstein
- Produced by: Ross M. Dinerstein
- Cinematography: Wolfgang Held
- Edited by: Samuel Nalband
- Music by: Jeremy Turner
- Production companies: Campfire; Forbes Entertainment; Olive Hill Media
- Distributed by: Hulu
- Release dates: March 17, 2021 (SXSW); April 2, 2021 (United States)
- Running time: 104 minutes
- Country: United States
- Language: English

WeWork: Or The Making and Breaking of a $47 Billion Unicorn is a 2021 American documentary film, written and directed by Jed Rothstein. It follows WeWork, a real estate company run by Adam Neumann, who was ultimately forced out of the company.

The film had its world premiere at South by Southwest on March 17, 2021. It was released on April 2, 2021, by Hulu. The film won a News and Documentary Emmy for Outstanding Business and Economic Documentary at the 43rd News and Documentary Emmy Awards on September 29, 2022.

== Synopsis ==
The film follows Adam Neumann, the founder of the real estate company WeWork, who is ultimately forced out of the company after a failed IPO.

== Production ==
In October 2020, it was announced Jed Rothstein would direct the film, with Hulu set to distribute. Campfire's Ross Dinerstein also produced alongside executive producers Rebecca Evans and Ross Girard from Campfire, Tim Lee, Michael Cho and Mimi Rode from Olive Hill Media, Travis Collins, Kyle Kramer and Randall Lane from Forbes and Danni Mynard.

== Release ==
The film had its world premiere at South by Southwest on March 17, 2021. It was released on April 2, 2021, on Hulu.

== Reception ==
WeWork: Or the Making and Breaking of a $47 Billion Unicorn holds a 77% approval rating on review aggregator website Rotten Tomatoes, based on 56 reviews, with a weighted average of 6.40/10. The film won a News and Documentary Emmy for Outstanding Business and Economic Documentary on September 28, 2022. Recipients include Executive Producers Michael Cho, Mimi Rode, Tim Lee, Travis Collins, Rebecca Evans, Ross Girard, Kyle Kramer, Randall Lane, Danni Mynard, Producer Ross M. Dinerstein, and Director Jed Rothstein. The site's critics consensus reads, "It's hard to ignore the parts that are left unexamined, but WeWork: Or the Making and Breaking of a $47 Billion Unicorn does well enough by its real-life stranger-than-fiction story."

== See also ==
- Billion Dollar Loser, 2020 nonfiction book about WeWork
