= Drew Crevello =

American film studio executive

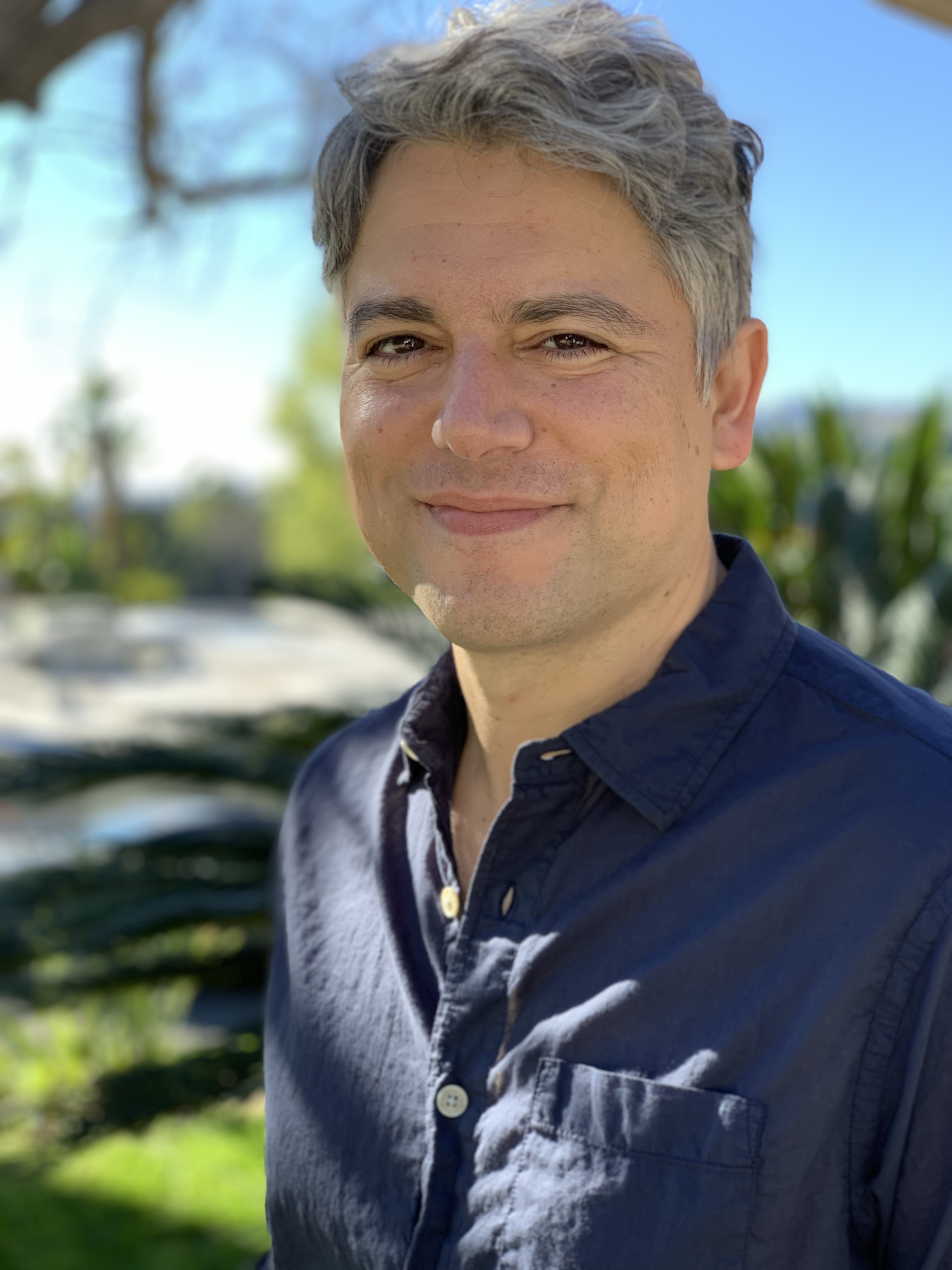
- Crevello at 2022 WeCrashed
- Born: United States
- Occupation: Writer
- Partner: Katie Dippold

Drew Crevello is a writer and former film studio executive known for his work with Fox and Warner Bros. studios.

As a vice president of film production at Fox, Crevello developed films such as Deadpool and X-Men: First Class.

In 2019, Crevello sold sci-fi pilot script The Long Dark with Scott Free Productions attached to produce and Ridley Scott attached to direct. He co-created and co-wrote the miniseries WeCrashed starring Jared Leto and Anne Hathaway in 2022.

Crevello's long-time girlfriend is screenwriter Katie Dippold.
