= Nomads (2010 film) =

- Directed by: Ricardo Benet
- Screenplay by: Ricardo Benet
- Starring: Lucy Liu
- Release date: October 19, 2010 (Morelia)
- Country: United States
- Language: English

Nomads is a 2010 drama film directed and written by Ricardo Benet and starring Lucy Liu. The film was filmed and premiered in Mexico and New York City and it was later released on January 22, 2011.

== Premise ==
The story centers on Susan, a documentary filmmaker, who is making a picture about subway suicides.

== Cast ==
- Lucy Liu as Susan
- Tamlyn Tomita
- Agim Kaba
- John Cothran Jr. as Phil
- Tenoch Huerta
- Dagoberto Gama
- Michael Den Dekker as Man in Wheelchair
- Rebekah Neumann as Sam

== Production ==
The filming locations and scenes were made in New York City, United States and Mexico, during October, 2009.

== Reception ==
In review for ScreenDaily, Howard Feinstein wrote that "the lethargy and overscriptedness will send this enterprise to an early festival and commercial grave."

== Awards ==
| Year | Award | Category | Recipient | Result |
|---|---|---|---|---|
| 2014 | Ariel Awards | Best Supporting Actor | Dagoberto Gama | Nominated |
