= Hoop (magazine) =

- Dwight Howard on the cover of the May/June '09 issue
- Editor-in-Chief: Ming Wong (2001-)
- Frequency: Bi-monthly
- Publisher: Professional Sports Publications; NBA Sports
- Founded: 1971
- Country: United States
- Based in: New York City
- Website: hoop.nba.com

HOOP is an official NBA publication, produced by Professional Sports Publications. The magazine features in-depth interviews with players, and also highlights the players' lives off the court.

Other popular sections include celebrity interviews and Dance Life.

Los Angeles Lakers guard Steve Nash answers readers' questions in his "Straight Shooter" column. Golden State Warriors guard Nate Robinson is the player video game editor and Miami Heat forward Shane Battier serves as Tech Editor and reviews products online for hoopmag.com.

HOOP also publishes international editions such as HOOP Japan, which features basketball English lessons from English, baby!.

== NBA player contributors ==
=== Current columnists ===
- Miami Heat forward Shane Battier (Tech editor)
- Indiana Pacers forward Danny Granger (Movie editor)
- Atlanta Hawks guard Devin Harris (Car editor)
- New Orleans Hornets forward Carl Landry (Music editor)
- Los Angeles Lakers guard Steve Nash (Straight Shooter)
- Atlanta Hawks center Zaza Pachulia (Fashion editor)
- Chicago Bulls guard Nate Robinson (Video Game editor)
- Former Indiana Pacers guard Jalen Rose (Fab 5 column)
- Minnesota Lynx guard Candice Wiggins (Fashion editor)
- Philadelphia 76ers forward Thaddeus Young (Music editor)

=== Former columnists ===
- Morris Almond (Rookie columnist, 2008)
- NBA Hall of Famer Rick Barry
- Former San Antonio Spurs forward Bruce Bowen (Defensive editor, 2007–08)
- Former Orlando Magic center Adonal Foyle (Book reviewer)
- Phoenix Suns center Channing Frye (Straight Shooter)
- Former Orlando Magic forward Pat Garrity (Straight Shooter, 2007–08)
- Former Houston Rockets guard Kenny Smith (Fashion editor, 2007)
- New Jersey Nets guard Deron Williams (Car editor, 2008)
