= Holyoke Building =

Historic building in Seattle, Washington, U.S.

- U.S. National Register of Historic Places
- Seattle Landmark
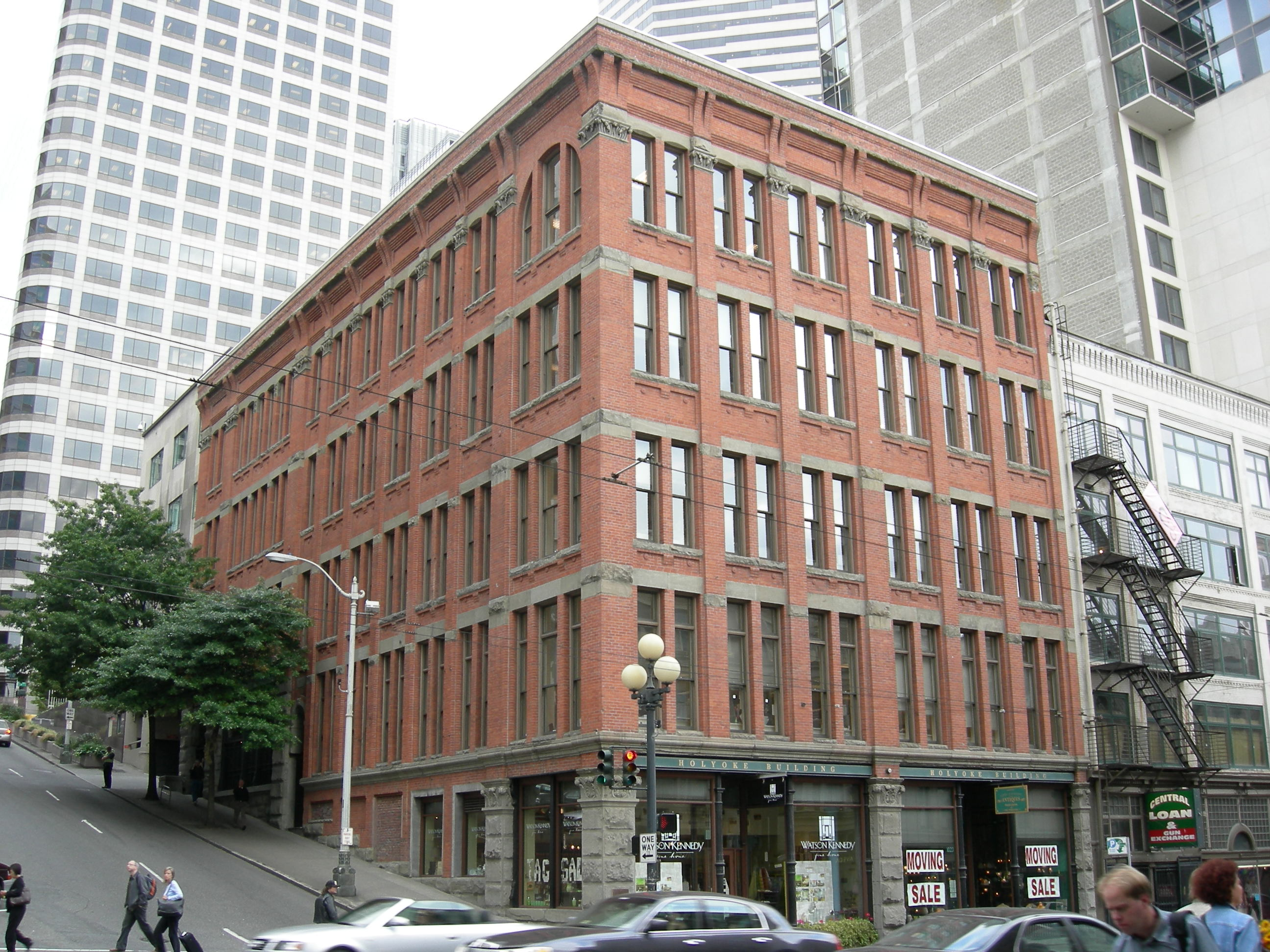
- The Holyoke Building, September 2007

- Location within Downtown Seattle
- Location: 1018-1022 1st Ave., Seattle, Washington
- Coordinates: 47°36′19.52″N 122°20′11.20″W
- Built: 1889-90
- Architect: Bird, Thomas G.; Dornbach, George W.
- Architectural style: Victorian Commercial; Romanesque
- NRHP reference No.: 76001888

Significant dates
- Added to NRHP: June 3, 1976
- Designated SEATL: July 17, 1978

The Holyoke Building (or Holyoke Block) is a historic building located in downtown Seattle, Washington. It is a substantial five story brick structure with stone trimmings. Construction began at the corner of First Avenue and Spring Streets just before the Great Seattle fire of 1889. Completed in early 1890, it was among the first permanent buildings completed and ready for occupancy in downtown Seattle following the fire. Today the Holyoke Building is one of the very few such buildings still standing in Seattle outside of the Pioneer Square district and is a historic remnant of the northward expansion of Seattle's business district between the time of the great fire and the Yukon Gold Rush in 1897.

The Holyoke Building housed many social and artistic clubs and organizations throughout its history. As early as 1895 it housed the Conservatory of Arts on the top floor. Later in the 1920s the Seattle Musical Club brought many local artists and musicians together in the building and other private and social clubs shared the building with toiletry manufacturers and offices.

The Holyoke Building is a subdued example of the Victorian Commercial style with elements of Romanesque style and remains almost completely intact from when it was built even down to the storefronts, which had been altered over time but have now been restored. It is the only known existing work of architects Thomas Bird and George Dornbach, whose brief partnership had ended before the building was even completed. Following the restoration of the building in 1975 by the building's owner Harbor Properties, it was listed on the National Register of Historic Places in 1976 and became a City of Seattle Landmark in 1978.

== History ==
=== Early history: 1889 - 1930 ===
The Holyoke Building takes its name from Richard Holyoke (1836–1906), a native of New Brunswick, Canada who immigrated to the Puget Sound region in 1860 to gain a foothold in the burgeoning timber industry, and was involved in the establishment of the mills at Seabeck. His venture was a success and even after Seabeck's mills were destroyed by fire in 1886 spelling the death of that community, he continued purchasing large amounts of Seattle property to show his faith in the area's future. Holyoke became a prominent community figure and a major booster for local lumber. He was the treasurer of the Farmers' Insurance Company and established and became the first president of the National Bank of Commerce (later Rainier Bank) in Seattle, which would become one of the region's biggest banks in the 20th century.

The lot at the corner of First Avenue (then called Front Street) and Spring Street had been owned by Holyoke since the early 1880s. Occupied by the Puget Sound Iron Works since the early 1870s, by 1888 the foundry was gone and the buildings sat mostly vacant and dilapidated. Holyoke expressed anxiousness to build on the lot but citing the scarcity of affordable brick at the time, was putting off any immediate plans. Construction finally began on the foundation of Holyoke's new business block in late spring of 1889 by contractors Lohse & Lawrence. The building was designed by Seattle architects Thomas G. Bird and George W. Dornbach who worked together only briefly in 1889. At the time of the fire, excavation on the site was underway and the large pit acted as a fire stop and helped keep the fire from advancing further north. Originally designed to be four stories tall, a fifth floor was added to house the Seattle Conservatory of Music, beginning a long tradition of music in the building. Construction progressed and the building was soon being called by local papers, "one of the largest buildings in town." The ground floor, with 16' high ceilings was divided into two storefronts facing First Avenue. Following the slope of the site, a third storefront was located at the rear of the building's second story facing Spring Street. To the East of this storefront was the building's main entrance and to the west a separate entrance for the second story offices; the building's first 3 floors were not originally internally connected. The upper floors, designed for offices, included those of attorneys, seamstresses and the co-architect Bird himself: each had 13' ceilings. Some of the building's earliest major tenants besides the Conservatory of Music on the top floor were the Comstock Educational Institute for Young Ladies, Wilmot & Davis stonecutters, U.S. Commissioner and lawyer Charles D. Emery, and the H.J. Hull & Company furniture store, owned by the brother of Alonzo Hull, that occupied the corner of the first and most of the second floor.

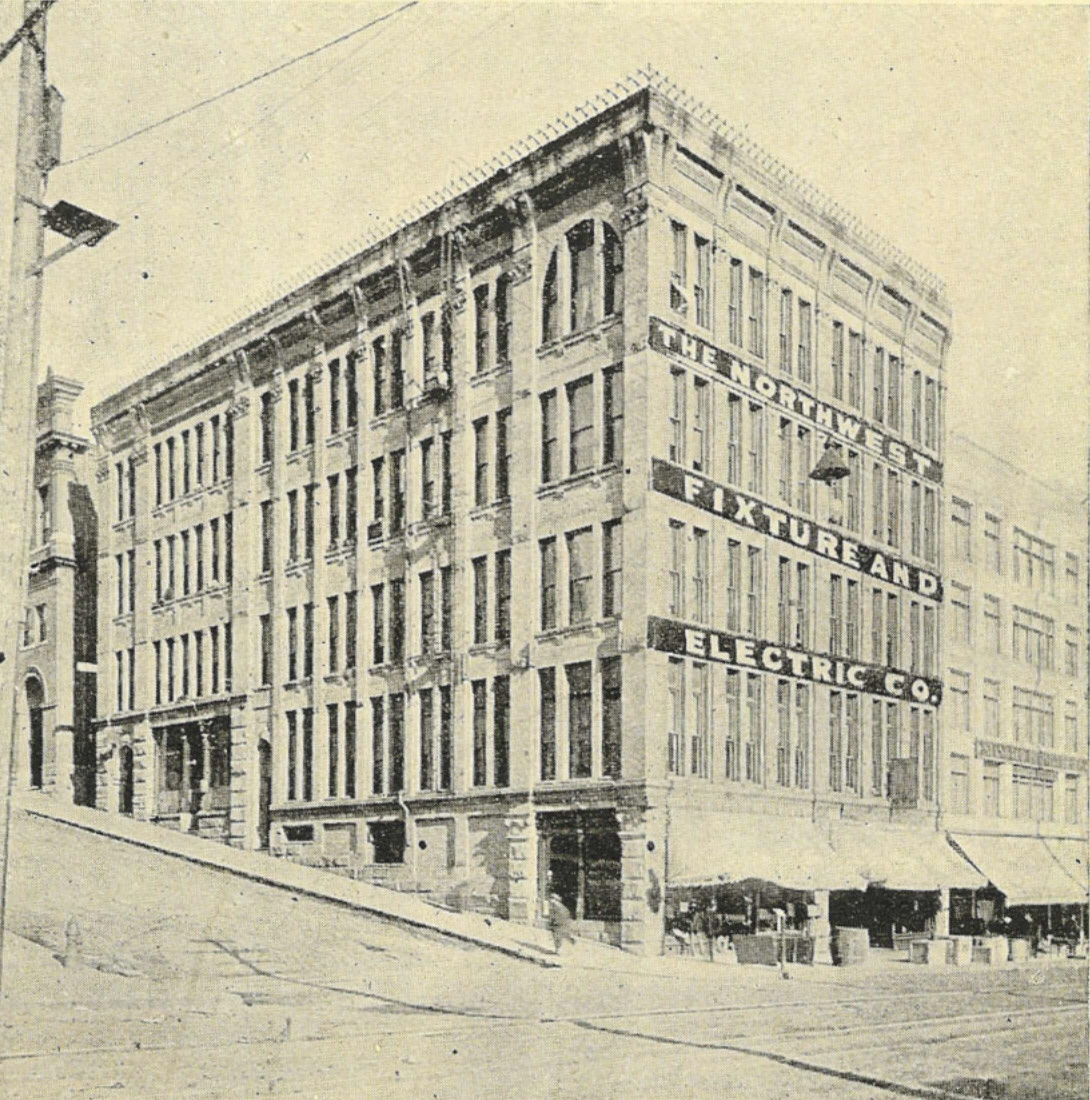
The Holyoke Building in 1900

Suffering financial reversals as a result of the Panic of 1893, Holyoke divested himself of all his Seattle property including the Holyoke Building. He removed to Skagit County where he owned a 600-acre oat farm near Conway in the early 1900s. He moved to Bellingham in 1905 where he remained until his death in March 1906 at age 70.

In November 1900, the building was purchased by Anton Stander, who had struck it rich during the Yukon Gold Rush. Stander's wife, who had convinced him to buy the property, would sue him for the building during the couple's scandalous and highly publicized divorce in 1906. Unable to fill all of the building's office space, subsequent owners leased entire floors as lofts or to light manufacturing firms. The Northwest Fixture & Electric Company, who during the gold rush supplied miners with electric motors and generators for mining and lighting, occupied the upper floors between 1894 and 1900. J. Kobi & Company manufactured toiletries on the fifth floor until moving to their own building in 1923.

By the turn of the nineteenth century to the twentieth and certainly into the 1920s, the Holyoke was a gathering place for Seattle musicians and artists. When she opened her studio in the Holyoke in 1902, Nellie Cornish, who later founded an arts school in Seattle, today's Cornish College of the Arts, listed among the building's artists Louise Coman Beck, violinist Vaughn Arthur, baritone Magnus Schuetz, and drama teacher Frank Egan, who with Rose Egan later founded the Egan School in Los Angeles. The Robert Morris Social Club held regular dances in the building. The Seattle Musical Club gathered in the building and suites on the building's second floor were used for practice sessions and discussion of musical theory. Other social clubs opened up in the building including the Lonesome Club that advertised, "Strangers and lonely people welcome."

=== Restoration to the current day ===
Over the years little had been done to alter the building's facade. Fire escapes were added to the building's North facade and later enlarged in 1919 under the supervision of architects Lawton & Moldenhour, among other interior upgrades and the storefronts were gradually modernized, all of which has since been undone. Likely as a result of the 1949 Olympia earthquake, most of the granite that originally finished the building's brick cornice has been removed.

Following its induction into the National Register in 1975, the Holyoke Building's owners, Harbor Properties, owned by prominent Seattleite Stimson Bullitt, proposed a nearly $1 million renovation that would convert the then mostly vacant building into a vibrant mix of air-conditioned offices and shops. Architects Olsen/Walker Associates, who had also designed the restoration of the Maynard Building in Pioneer Square, proposed to cut the inside of the building in half with a large interior landscaped courtyard. For Harbor Properties, who were better known for demolishing historic buildings such as the Arlington Hotel, this project was a first.

The building is currently home to the Seattle branch of WeWork, a collaborative office space.

== See also ==
- National Register of Historic Places listings in Seattle, Washington
- List of landmarks in Seattle
