= Frances X. Frei =

Professor at Harvard Business School

- Education: Wharton School of the University of Pennsylvania
- Occupation: Academic
- Employer(s): Harvard Business School & Uber
- Spouse: Anne Morriss

Frances Frei is a professor of Technology and Operations Management and the course lead for first-year diversity and inclusion studies at Harvard Business School. She has worked for Uber and been on the board of directors at WeWork.

== Early life ==
Frances X. Frei graduated from the University of Pennsylvania, where she earned a bachelor's degree in mathematics. She subsequently earned a master's degree in industrial engineering from Pennsylvania State University, and a PhD in Operations and Information Management from the Wharton School of the University of Pennsylvania.

== Career ==
Frei is a professor of Technology and Operations Management at Harvard Business School.

Frei joined Uber in June 2017, where she was appointed as senior vice-president for leadership and strategy of leadership. She helped improve the company culture by encouraging teamwork. Frei stepped down as senior vice-president in February 2018 to develop an executive education program focused on women and underrepresented minorities, although she has stayed on in an advisory role.

Frei gave a talk at the TED conference in 2018 on the topic of building trust.

Frei was hired as a senior adviser to Riot Games in September 2018 to help with implementation of their "Culture and Diversity & Inclusion Initiative", following a published report outlining many former and current employees there asserting of sexual discrimination within the workplace.

On September 4, 2019, WeWork added Frei to the company's board of directors where she became the first female on the Board. Prior to joining the WeWork Board, Frei's consultancy firm was employed on a 3-year contract valued at approximately $5mn (including stock options) related to gender equality training and hiring.

In April 2023, Frei and her wife, Anne Morriss, launched their first podcast, "Fixable", produced by TED Audio Collective. Guests call in with their workplace issues and problems are resolved in 30 minutes or less.

== Personal life ==
Frei is married to Anne Morriss. She has two sons.

== Works ==
- Frei, Frances; Morriss, Anne (2012). Uncommon Service: How to Win by Putting Customers at the Core of Your Business. Cambridge, Massachusetts: Harvard Business Review Press. ISBN 9781422133316. OCLC 800604212.
- Frei, Frances; Morriss, Anne (2020). Unleashed: The Unapologetic Leader's Guide to Empowering Everyone Around You. Cambridge, Massachusetts: Harvard Business Review Press.
