= Anton Stander =

- Born: Anton Prestopec; June 16, 1867; Javorje close to Litija, Lower Carniola Austro-Hungarian Empire (present-day Slovenia)
- Died: April 2, 1952; Multnomah, Oregon
- Occupation: prospector
- Known for: He was one of the six wealthiest prospectors in the Klondike Gold Rush
- Spouse(s): Violeta Violett Raymond (nee Little) (1901-1906), Lillian Bessie Longworthy (nee Hobson) (1909-his death, separated)
- Children: Otis F. Stander (1907-1992), Marjorie Stander Pushkin (1912-2005) (presumably both adopted)
- Parent(s): Matej Prestopec (Mathew Paistopic / Matthew Prestopec), Uršula Rojc (Ursla Musteo / Urshula Mustar / Uršula Muster)

Anton Stander (June 16, 1867 – April 2, 1952), was a pioneer and the prospector from the great Klondike Gold Rush. He was one of the six wealthiest prospectors in Klondike.

He came to U.S. 1886 from Slovenia and arrived in Alaska 1896 when he struck lucky near Bonanza Creek.

From 1897 he lived in Dawson City with dancer and opera singer Violet Raymond (he bought her all of the diamonds in Dawson worth $75.000, gave her $20.000 in gold dust and $1000 a month in spending money), they married in 1901 in San Francisco, then settled in Seattle. His wedding gift to her was supposedly a box full of gold worth approximately $100.000 and honeymoon in the Orient, visiting Japan and China before making a trip to Paris.

Violet estimated they carried a half million dollars out of the mines.

From 1900 they were the owners of Seattle's Holyoke Building and from 1905 to 1906 also the owners of the newly built 250-room Stander's Hotel (razed in 1930). Less than a year and a half after the opening of the hotel, Anton and Violet divorced, and they divided an estate worth approximately $900,000.

Stander had a problem with alcohol.

Some says that Stander died in Pioneers' Home at Sitka, Alaska, some that he died in Multnomah, Oregon, because he was evicted from Pioneers' Home for drunkenness.

== Further resources ==
- Sivec, Ivan. Prekletstvo zlata : po sledeh najbogatejšega slovenskega zlatokopa, Mladinska knjiga, 2006. ISBN 9788611175454/
- Šrimpf, Marjan., Kranvogel, Robert.Od Eldorada do pekla, TV Slovenija, 2019.
