= Hôtel de Langeac =

Residence in Paris, France

Coordinates: 48.8717°N 2.3032°E

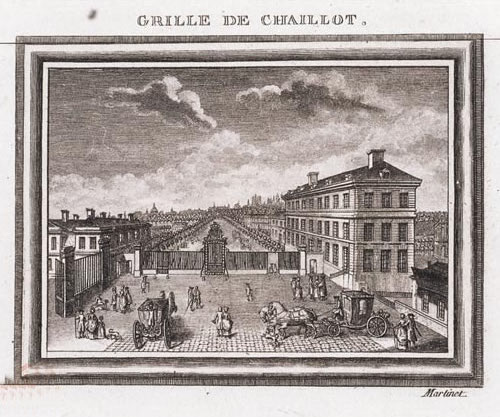

The Hôtel de Langeac was a residence in Paris, France, located at 92, Avenue des Champs-Élysées, the corner of the Champs-Élysées and the rue de Berri.

The property was first purchased by Louis-Phélypeaux de La Vrillière, Comte de Saint-Florentin, later the Duc de La Vrillière, for his mistress, the Marquise de Langeac. Construction on the home began in 1768 and proceeded slowly, partly due to an interruption. In 1777, the Comte D'Artois obtained the property but in 1778 the Comte de Langeac (son of the Marquise) regained the property and work again started to finally complete the building. The two-story house had a neo-classical facade and an asymmetrical interior plan with two parallel sets of rooms.

The Hôtel de Langeac may have been best known as the (rented) residence of Thomas Jefferson while he was the American Minister to France, from 1785 to 1789. "I have at length procured a house in a situation much more pleasing to me than my present", he wrote in September, 1785. Jefferson grew Indian corn in the garden of the house. He filled the house with neoclassical furniture and employed a household staff of seven or eight servants, including a coachman, footman, and valet. Much of his official business was conducted from the house.

Jefferson returned to the U.S. in September 1789 and his belongings were shipped to him in Philadelphia. The building was seized during the French Revolution, sold in 1793 and demolished in 1842. The subsequent five-story building on the site houses businesses, including the co-working offices operated by WeWork and a Morgan boutique.

== Historic plaque ==
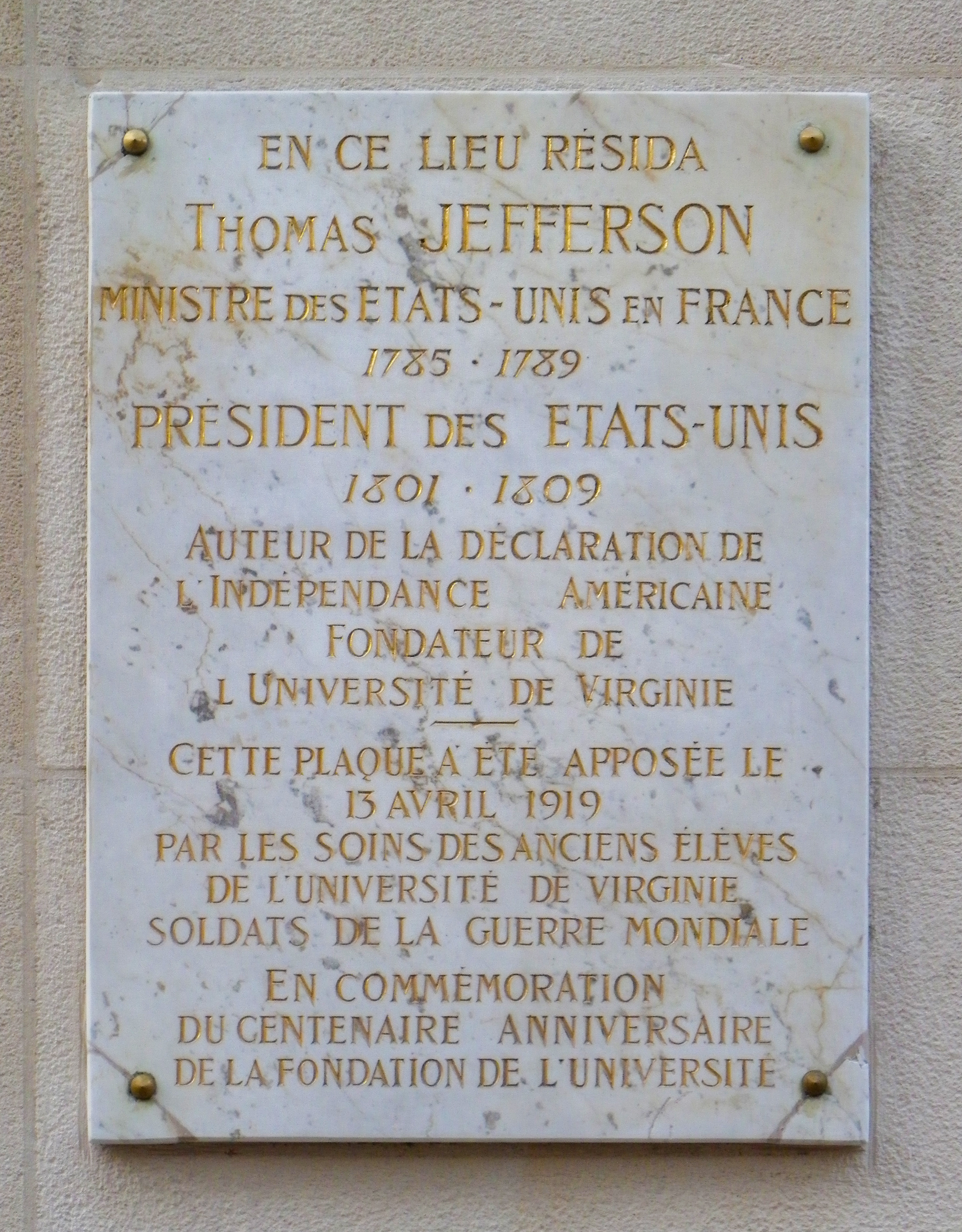
Plaque near 92 Avenue des Champs-Elysées

A plaque near the site, (opposite Ladurée), erected in 1919 in the French language, offers this information:

In this place resided Thomas Jefferson, Minister of the United States to France 1785–1789, President of the United States 1801–1809, Author of the American Declaration of Independence, Founder of the University of Virginia

The plaque was created and installed by "the former students of the University of Virginia, soldiers of the World War, in commemoration of the 100th anniversary of the founding of the university".
