= Flatiron School =

Educational organization

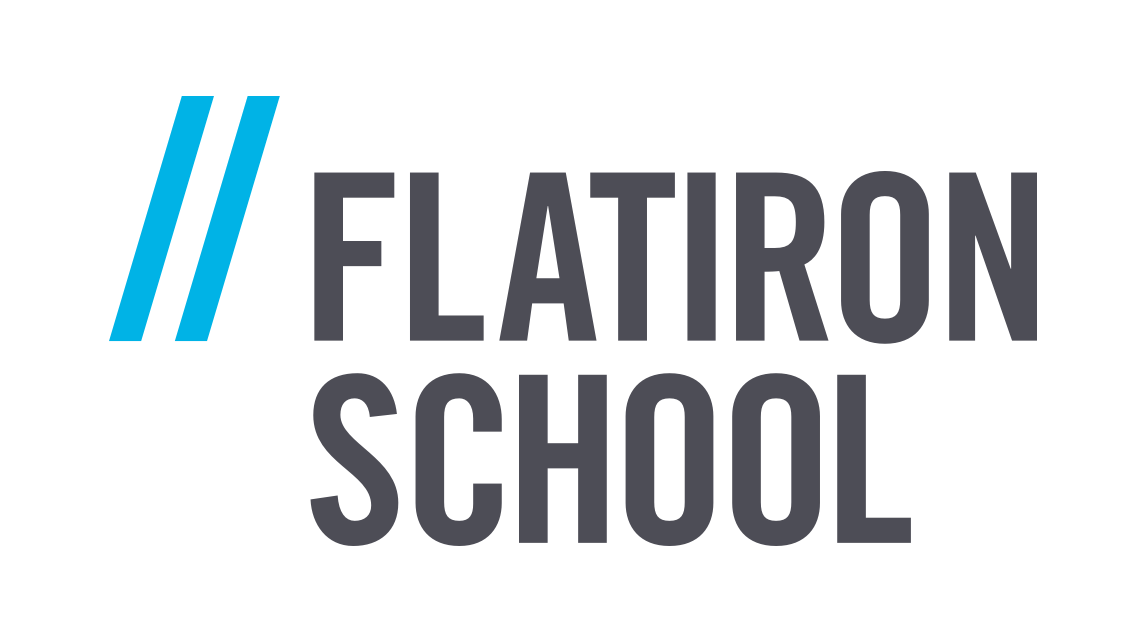
- Available in: English
- Founded: 2012; 14 years ago
- Headquarters: New York City, US
- Area served: Worldwide
- Owner: Carrick Capital Partners
- Founders: Adam Enbar, Avi Flombaum
- Industry: Internet
- Employees: 151–200
- Website: flatironschool.com
- Current status: Active

Flatiron School is an educational organization founded in 2012 by Adam Enbar and Avi Flombaum. The organization is based in New York City and teaches software engineering, computer programming, data science, product design, and cybersecurity engineering. In 2017, the company was sued for making false statements about its graduates' earning potential. It was acquired by WeWork in 2017 and sold to Carrick Capital Partners in 2020.

== History ==
Flatiron School was founded in 2012 by Adam Enbar and Avi Flombaum.

In 2017, the New York State Attorney General sued Flatiron School for operating without a license and making false statements about its graduates' earning potential. The two parties reached a $375,000 settlement. Flatiron School claimed a 98.5% employment rate, but this included apprentices and freelance workers, while the claimed average salary of $74,447 included only graduates in full-time employment.

In 2018, Yale University announced a collaboration with the Flatiron School during Yale's "Summer Session": together, the institutions offered a Web Development Bootcamp for summer 2019, which offered two Yale College credits for students.

The organization has made efforts to promote parity in tech, working with other companies to sponsor course scholarships for women, LGBTQ+ people, and members of underserved communities.

=== Takeovers and acquisitions ===
Flatiron School was acquired by WeWork, a collaborative workspace company, in October 2017. Following the acquisition, they launched Access Labs, a joint effort to make tech education accessible to low-income earners in New York. In August 2018, Flatiron School acquired Designation, a Chicago-based UX/UI design school, and in December 2018 it expanded design courses elsewhere.

Since being acquired by WeWork, the company has expanded, opening campuses in Atlanta, Austin, Chicago, Dallas, Denver, Houston, London, San Francisco, Seattle, and Washington, D.C.

In 2020, WeWork sold Flatiron School to Carrick Capital Partners.
