= English, baby! =

Social network in the US

- Website type: Education, Social network service
- Available in: American English, Japanese, Mandarin Chinese, Spanish
- Owner: Versation
- Creators: John Hayden, co-founder, CEO; Miguel McKelvey, co-founder
- Website: www.englishbaby.com
- Commercial: Yes
- Registration: Required for some services
- Launched: 2000; 26 years ago

English, baby! is a social network and online curriculum for learning conversational English and slang based in Portland, Oregon. As of 2012, the service is had more than 1.6 million members, at that time making it one of the largest, most well-established and highest rated online communities of English learners and teachers. As of 2012, English, baby! was most popular in China, representing roughly a quarter of its users are based. As of 2012, the customer base included users in Turkey, Brazil, India, Egypt, the United States, and Taiwan.

As of 2012, the company offered a free membership as well as a paid, premium membership and frequently used celebrities in its English lesson videos.

== Lessons ==
English, baby! is home to several thousand English lessons. Many of the lessons feature celebrities teaching a term or phrase and discussing how they learned English if it is not their first language. Celebrities who have taught English lessons on English, baby! include NBA All-Stars such as Steve Nash and Dwight Howard, Olympic gold medalist figure skaters Shen Xue and Zhao Hongbo, and musicians Sheryl Crow and Girl Talk.

The website also produces an English lesson soap opera series and reality TV style videos. Other lessons are based on MP3s instead of videos and based on improvised conversations between native English speaking actors. Most lessons include grammar instruction, quizzes, and vocabulary words. Much of the lesson content is only available to premium "Super Members" who pay $5 per month. These members also have access to a live teacher to answer questions for them.

In addition to students, ESL teachers can create lessons on English, baby! or use content from the site in their classrooms.

== History ==
English, baby! was founded in 2000 when John Hayden returned from working for Hitachi and teaching English in Japan. He found that many students lacked a means of learning conversational English and started English, baby! to create an online experience similar to traveling in the English-speaking world or studying abroad. Hayden remains the company's CEO.

In 2005, Versation Inc., a parent company for English, baby! was created. Versation also produces alumni management and recruitment software for colleges and universities.

Following the popularity of sites like MySpace and Facebook, English, baby! introduced social networking features in 2006, enabling members to create profiles on the site. In 2009, English, baby! registered its one millionth member.

English, baby! has content-sharing partnerships with companies such Nokia in China, and HOOP Magazine in Japan.
