= P.O.V. (magazine) =

American magazine

- Categories: Lifestyle
- Frequency: Monthly
- Circulation: 360,000
- Founder: Drew Massey
- First issue: 1995
- Final issue: 2000
- Company: Freedom Communications, Inc.
- Country: United States
- Based in: New York City
- Language: English

P.O.V. magazine was a New York City-based lifestyle magazine targeted at young professional men. The magazine was founded in 1995 by Drew Massey and ceased publication with its February 2000 issue. Its owner, Freedom Communications, citing increased competition as the reason for its closing.

At its peak, the magazine had an audited circulation of 360,000 and 40 employees.

P.O.V. was named by Adweek as the startup of the year in 1997.

Point Of View October 1999 issue featuring Anna Kournikova.
