= Sandeep Mathrani =

Indian-American real estate executive

- Born: 1962 (age 63–64); Mumbai, India
- Education: Cathedral and John Connon School; Stevens Institute of Technology (BA, MS)
- Occupations: Managing Partner, Atlas Hill RE; Former Chairman and CEO, WeWork

Sandeep Mathrani (born 1962) is an Indian-American real estate executive, and was the chief executive officer and chairman of WeWork until he resigned in May 2023. He was CEO of Brookfield Properties' Retail Group and vice chairman of Brookfield Properties from 2018 to 2020. Prior to that, he was CEO of GGP for eight years until it was sold to Brookfield in August 2018.

== Early life and education ==
In 1986, Mathrani earned a master's degree in management science from Stevens. He was mentored by Bruce Flatt, Bruce Ratner and Steven Roth.

== Business career ==
Mathrani began as the CEO of GGP Inc. in 2011, just as the company was emerging from Chapter 11 bankruptcy. He was hired away from his previous job as an executive with Vornado Realty Trust. He was CEO until 2018, when it was purchased by Brookfield Property Partners. After the acquisition, Mathrani joined Brookfield as the chief executive of its retail property management arm.

In February 2020, Mathrani was brought on board as the new CEO of real estate company WeWork, following the ouster of its CEO Adam Neumann and the collapse of its IPO. He resigned in May 2023.

In September 2024, Mathrani founded a real estate venture, Atlas Hill RE as managing partner, and was part of the consortium that had acquired Annapolis Mall from Unibail-Rodamco-Westfield. In September 2025, Atlas would also be involved in the acquisition of The Galleria at Fort Lauderdale. At both properties, Atlas was a financial stakeholder and the mall's retail leasing representatives.

== See also ==
- Indians in the New York City metropolitan region
