= Trader Monthly =

Financial trader lifestyle magazine

Trader Monthly was a lifestyle magazine for financial traders founded by Magnus Greaves and Randall Lane. The headquarters was in New York City. The target audience of Trader Monthly was the financial community with an average income at or exceeding US$450,000 or net worth greater than $2 million. This included traders who worked at banks, hedge funds, exchange floors, proprietary trading companies, independent firms, private offices, insurance companies, asset management firms, energy firms, and other trading locales.

The magazine had a BPA Worldwide-qualified circulation of 106,710 subscribers and launched in November 2004. The target audience of the magazine was almost exclusively male. The magazine also had a UK edition with a circulation of 50,000.

The magazine contained articles which profiled traders and their strategies. Also contained were articles on high end real estate, cars, fashion, liquor, and gadgets. The magazine's slogan was "See It, Make It, Spend It."

On February 3, 2009, the magazine's publisher ended Trader Monthly's operations.

On April 7, 2010, New York–based independent financial news provider DealFlow Media, Inc., announced the acquisition of select assets of DoubleDown Media including Trader Monthly, Dealmaker, and Corporate Leader magazines, amongst other Doubledown brands and products. Private Air was not included in this acquisition.
