= Billion Dollar Loser =

2020 non-fiction book about office space leasing company WeWork

- Author: Reeves Wiedeman
- Language: English
- Genre: Nonfiction
- Publisher: Hodder & Stoughton
- Publication date: 2020
- ISBN: 9781529385076
- OCLC: 1202266953

Billion Dollar Loser is a 2020 book by Reeves Wiedeman about WeWork and its founder Adam Neumann.

== Synopsis ==
The book combines interviews with WeWork employees with analysis from other industry experts to recount the founding of office space leasing company WeWork, and its rapid ascent followed by its later devaluation and unsuccessful IPO. Neumann's role as CEO and the cult of personality surrounding him are a major focus of the book.

== Reception ==
Publishers Weekly wrote that the book was "a thrilling page-turner about the fantastic success and subsequent crash of WeWork." Writing for The New Republic, J.C. Pan described it as "a definitive chronology of a company doomed not by one bad business strategy—or even Neumann’s outsize ego—but by the rot of a postrecession economy that nurtured a certain flavor of investor-class mania." On the other hand, Walter Kirn described the book as a "cautionary tale" about Neumann.

Jennifer Szalai of The New York Times wrote that Wiedeman allowed the evidence and anecdotes from Neumann's time as CEO to speak for itself, illustrating a confidence game through which "Neumann had passed himself off as a tech visionary." Kathryn Brenzel, in a review for the trade publication The Real Deal, wrote that the book was "more recap than revelation".
