= Miguel McKelvey =

American businessman

- Born: July 4, 1974 (age 52)
- Education: University of Oregon
- Occupation: Businessman
- Known for: Co-founder and chief culture officer, WeWork

Miguel McKelvey (born 1974) is an American businessman, and the co-founder and former chief culture officer of WeWork.

== Early life ==
McKelvey grew up in a "five-mother collective" in Eugene, Oregon. His family started and ran a weekly newspaper called the Eugene Weekly.

In a January 2020 interview with Fortune, McKelvey called himself "a wild kid" on the high school basketball court. He said that he found a sense of accountability from his coach, who was a strict disciplinarian. He said of Coach Stepp, "I didn’t grow up with my father, so I never had someone telling me to keep in line."

He graduated from South Eugene High School in 1992. McKelvey first attended Colorado College and, after seeing a sculpture he created, his professor, Carl Reed, recommended he consider architecture for graduate school. He transferred to the University of Oregon where he earned a Bachelor of Architecture degree in 1999.

McKelvey played on the Oregon Ducks basketball team for two years. However, the official record book indicates he lettered for only one year, 1997.

== Career ==
Before graduating from college, McKelvey worked as a busboy in a restaurant, and spent two summers at an Alaskan fish processing plant.

After graduating from college, McKelvey went to Tokyo to visit a friend, and while there, he co-founded English, baby!, a web portal and social network for students to create and take foreign-language online courses. The website offers vocabulary quizzes, grammar lessons, and a social network that connects English-language learners with English-fluent peers. The business grew to 25 employees.

McKelvey next moved to New York City, where he worked at Jordan Parnass Digital Architecture. The firm was responsible for all the American Apparel projects, and McKelvey became the manager of the international retail roll out.

Adam Neumann worked in the same office building, and the two met at a party. In 2008, the two convinced their landlord to let them divide the floors of an empty building into semi-communal offices and rent them out; this was the start of Green Desk. McKelvey designed the name, logo, and a working website for the new business in one night. Green Desk was an eco-friendly coworking space, with a focus on recycled furniture and wind-power electricity. McKelvey and Neumann eventually sold the business to their landlord, Joshua Guttman, and evolved the concept into WeWork.

WeWork was founded in 2010, with its first office space in the Manhattan neighborhood of SoHo. McKelvey served as WeWork's chief culture officer. He directed construction, architecture, and web design for the company, and was also responsible for building and operating culture. Since 2010, The We Company has launched several new ventures: WeLive, a co-living venture; Rise by We, a luxury gym concept; and WeGrow, a private elementary school. In 2019, the company introduced The We Company, a parent brand that comprises WeWork, WeLive, WeGrow, and other ventures.

In 2017, McKelvey was named WeWork's chief culture officer and in 2019, Fast Company named McKelvey one of its Most Creative People.

On September 17, 2019, amid growing investor concerns over its corporate governance, valuation, and outlook for the business, WeWork formally withdrew its S-1 filing and announced the postponing of its IPO. At that time, the reported public valuation of the company was around $10 billion, a reduction from the $47 billion valuation it achieved in January and less than the $12.8 billion it had raised since 2010.

On June 5, 2020, McKelvey announced that he would be leaving WeWork at the end of the month. In November 2023, WeWork filed bankruptcy in the United States District Court for the District of New Jersey, listing liabilities of approximately $10 billion to $50 billion.

In 2022, McKelvey purchased a $10m controlling stake in apparel maker American Giant. According to him, his ownership of the fashion brand was part of his larger vision to revitalize US factories and restore them as economic drivers.

== Personal life ==
McKelvey was married to Hiyam Khalifa, a former investment banker born in Detroit, before their divorce in 2017.
