= WeWork =

American coworkspace company

WeWork Inc.
- Type: Private limited company
- Traded as: OTC Pink: WEWKQ (2023); NYSE: WE (2021–2023)
- Industry: Commercial real estate
- Founded: 2010; 16 years ago
- Founders: Adam Neumann; Miguel McKelvey
- Headquarters: New York City, U.S.
- Number of locations: 154 locations in 35 countries (2024)
- Area served: Worldwide
- Key people: John Santora (CEO)
- Services: Coworking
- Net income: 436,099 United States dollar (2016)
- Parent: Cupar Grimmond, an affiliate of Yardi Systems (60%); SoftBank (20%); Other (20%)
- Website: wework.com

WeWork Inc. is an American company headquartered in New York City that provides coworking spaces, including physical and virtual shared spaces, in approximately 600 buildings in 125 cities.

WeWork was founded in 2010 by Adam Neumann and Miguel McKelvey. Over the following 10 years, the company raised $12.8 billion in financing at valuations as high as $47 billion, mostly from the SoftBank Vision Fund, led by Masayoshi Son. In September 2019, the company filed documentation to become a public company and revealed issues with corporate governance. Investors forced both the cancellation of the IPO and the resignation of Neumann. The company went public via a merger with a SPAC instead in 2021, and filed for Chapter 11 bankruptcy protection on November 6, 2023. As part of the bankruptcy reorganization, in 2024, Cupar Grimmond (an affiliate of Yardi Systems) acquired a 60% stake in the company, 20% was acquired by affiliates of SoftBank, and 20% was acquired by other investors. The company shrank its operations, selling all owned real estate and cancelling or amending hundreds of leases.

== History ==
=== 2008–2015 ===
In May 2008, Adam Neumann and American Miguel McKelvey established GreenDesk, an "eco-friendly coworking space" in Brooklyn. In 2010, Neumann and McKelvey sold the business and founded WeWork, renting its first location in SoHo, Manhattan, which opened in April 2011. Manhattan real estate developer Joel Schreiber purchased a 33% interest in the company for $15 million.

In 2011, PepsiCo placed a few employees in the location, who acted as advisors to smaller WeWork member companies, making the location a startup incubator.

By 2013, WeWork customers included 350 startups such as Fitocracy and HackHands.

By 2014, WeWork was considered "the fastest-growing lessee of new office space in New York" and was on track to become "the fastest-growing lessee [lessor] of new space in America." WeWork investors as of 2014 included J.P. Morgan Chase & Co, T. Rowe Price, Wellington Management, Goldman Sachs, the President and Fellows of Harvard College, Benchmark, and Mortimer Zuckerman, former CEO of Boston Properties.

In February 2015, WeWork was named to Fast Company’s 50 Most Innovative Companies list. On June 1, 2015, Artie Minson, former chief financial officer of Time Warner Cable, joined the company as president and chief operating officer. In August 2015, the company acquired CASE, a real estate and construction technology company, in its first acquisition. According to its founder, the speed of the transaction damaged the organizational culture of CASE.

=== 2016 ===
In March 2016, WeWork raised $430 million in financing from Legend Holdings and Hony Capital, valuing the company at $16 billion. In June 2016, the company announced layoffs of 7% of its staff and implemented a temporary hiring freeze. In July 2016, WeWork fired and sued Joanna Strange, an employee who leaked information to the press that showed that WeWork would miss its financial goals. By October 2016, the company had raised $1.7 billion in private capital. In October 2016, WeWork announced plans to open a fourth location in Central Square, Cambridge, with space for 550 desks. WeWork opened offices in Boston's Leather District and Fort Point in 2014. It also announced plans to open a location in Lincoln Square in Bellevue, Washington.

In 2016, WeWork launched a separate but related co-living venture called WeLive in New York City and in Crystal City, Virginia, near Ronald Reagan Washington National Airport in the Washington metropolitan area. A third WeLive location in Seattle was planned in the new Third and Lenora building in 2020, but the lease was terminated in October 2019. In July 2021, WeWork terminated this business line.

=== 2017 ===
In April 2017, WeWork launched an online store for services and software for its members. In May 2017, WeWork opened a luxury health club at its Broad Street, Manhattan location. The space includes exercise equipment and a boxing area, general workout area, spa, and a yoga studio with fitness classes. In June 2017, in partnership with Embassy Group, WeWork India, led by then 25-year old Karan Virwani, son of the Embassy Group owner Jitu Virwani, opened its first space in Bangalore, India, named WeWork Galaxy, with capacity for 2,200 members. In July 2017, the company raised $760 million in a Series G financing round valuing the company at $20 billion. Also in July 2017, WeWork announced expansion plans into China, with US$500 million invested by SoftBank and Hony Capital. In August 2017, the company raised $4.4 billion from the SoftBank Vision Fund at a valuation of approximately $20 billion. In September 2017, WeWork expanded into Southeast Asia via the acquisition of Singapore-based SpaceMob, and it allocated $500 million to grow in Southeast Asia.

In October 2017, WeWork signed a contract to acquire the Lord & Taylor Building on Fifth Avenue in Manhattan from the Hudson's Bay Company for $850 million, with additional plans to invest over $450 million on a renovation. The deal also included the use of floors of certain HBC owned department stores in Germany, New York, Toronto, and Vancouver as WeWork's shared office workspaces. The transaction closed in February 2019. The building was sold to Amazon.com in March 2020 for $1.15 billion.

In October 2017, WeWork acquired Flatiron School, a coding school. It was sold in June 2020. In November 2017, WeWork invested in The Wing, a co-working space for women. It sold the stake in January 2020. Also in November 2017, WeWork acquired Meetup for approximately $156 million. It was sold at a loss in 2020. In the same month, WeWork invested in Wavegarden, which designs and manufactures artificial wave devices. In addition, during November 2017, WeWork announced that in the fall of 2018 it would launch WeGrow, a private school for children aged 3 through students in grade 4. The first permanent location was in WeWork's New York headquarters. In September 2019, Rebekah Neumann resigned as CEO of WeGrow. WeGrow closed at the end of the 2019 academic year. In December 2017, WeWork opened its first location in Singapore.

=== 2018 ===
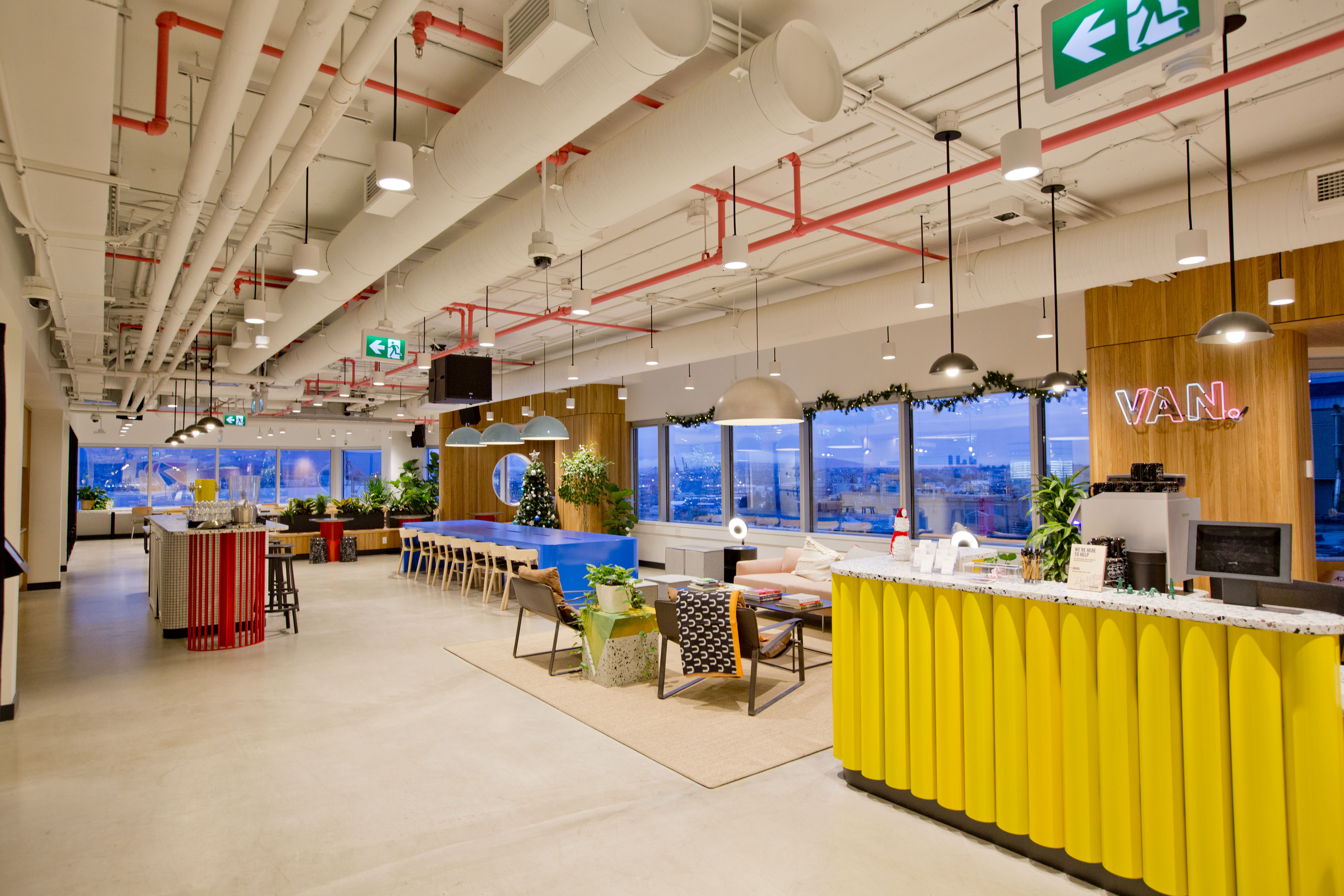
WeWork Coworking Space in Vancouver

In January 2018, students taking online university courses from 2U were given access to WeWork common spaces and meeting rooms. In December 2018, WeWork opened its first location on a college campus at the University of Maryland, College Park. In March 2018, WeWork raised over $400 million alongside Rhône Group, a private equity firm to start a fund to purchase properties directly. Also in March 2018, WeWork acquired Conductor. Conductor executives bought back the company from WeWork in December 2019. In April 2018, WeWork acquired Chinese coworking operator Naked Hub for $400 million. In May 2018, WeWork acquired MissionU, a self-styled college alternative, for $4 million in stock. MissionU was wound-down shortly afterwards and students were not charged tuition. Cash was returned from MissionU to its investors. MissionU's CEO went on to become COO of WeWork's kindergarten program, WeGrow. In July 2018, the company restricted employees globally from being reimbursed by the company for meals that contained pork, poultry, or red meat for environmental and animal rights reasons. The firm also announced that it would not provide meat for events at its locations nor allow meat at self-serve food kiosks in its locations. In July 2018, WeWork raised $500 million to expand its business in China, valuing its Chinese subsidiary at $5 billion. In August 2018, WeWork's Flatiron School acquired Designation, a for-profit design school. In September 2018, WeWork acquired Teem, an office management software company, for $100 million. It was sold to iOffice in 2020. In November 2018, SoftBank acquired a warrant to buy up to $3 billion worth of shares in the company by the end of September 2019 at a $42 billion valuation.

In 2018, the company purchased a Gulfstream G650 business jet for more than $60 million, cited as an example of CEO Adam Neumann's excessive spending.

In September 2018, the company eliminated broad-based employee non-compete clauses to settle a lawsuit from the Attorney General of New York.

WeWork lost over $2 billion in 2018.

=== 2019 ===
In January 2019, WeWork raised an additional $2 billion from SoftBank at a $47 billion valuation. SoftBank considered investing as much as $16 billion but downsized plans due to turbulence in financial markets and opposition from investors. The investment brought SoftBank's total funding in WeWork to over $10 billion.

In April 2019, WeWork acquired Managed by Q, a platform that office tenants can use to hire service providers. It was sold at a loss in March 2020. On April 29, 2019, WeWork filed a draft registration statement for a proposed initial public offering. By July 2019, Adam Neumann had liquidated $700 million of his WeWork stock.

On August 14, 2019, the company filed Form S-1 in preparation for an initial public offering. The filing revealed significant losses, expensive lease agreements, and a complex relationship with founder Adam Neumann. It also disclosed $47 billion of future lease obligations and only $4 billion of future lease commitments. The company was then "besieged with criticism over its governance, business model, and ability to turn a profit."

The company changed the legal name of WeWork to We Company and, according to the August 2019 Form S-1 filing, the firm paid $5.9 million to an entity owned by Adam Neumann and other WeWork founders for brand licensing the name. In early September 2019, Neumann returned the $5.9 million to the company for the use of the trademark and gave the company all of the trademark rights for the "We" family trademarks.

On August 27, 2019, WeWork acquired Spacious, a company that leases unused space from restaurants during daytime hours and then rents this space to remote workers. Spacious was shut down 4 months later, in December 2019.

On September 4, 2019, WeWork added its first female director, Harvard Business School professor Frances Frei, to the company's board of directors.

On September 13, 2019, the company announced changes to its corporate governance to include the ability for the board of directors to pick a new CEO and not having CEO Adam Neumann's family members on the board. Neumann also agreed to transfer to the company any profits from his real estate deals with the company.

On September 17, 2019, amid growing investor concerns over its corporate governance, valuation, and outlook for the business, WeWork formally withdrew its S-1 filing and announced the postponing of its IPO. At that time, the reported public valuation of the company was around $10 billion, a reduction from the $47 billion valuation it achieved in January and less than the $12.8 billion it had raised since 2010. In mid-September 2019, unrelated to the company's delayed initial public offering, Wendy Silverstein, the co-head of WeWork's real estate investment fund ARK, departed the company. By September 23, 2019, SoftBank wanted Neumann removed as chief executive. The following day, amid mounting pressure from investors, company co-founder Adam Neumann resigned as CEO and gave up majority voting control in WeWork. Artie Minson and Sebastian Gunningham were named co-CEOs of the company. That same day, WeWork put its Gulfstream G650 aircraft up for sale. Critics said the plane had become a "red flag in the leadup to the company's IPO" and had created problems with employees who didn't receive promised bonuses or raises.

In October 2019, Neumann received close to $1.7 billion from SoftBank for resigning from WeWork's board of directors and severing most of his ties to the company. The $1.7 billion included $970 million for his remaining shares, a $185 million consulting fee, and a $500 million credit to assist him to repay his loans to JPMorgan Chase. He was retained as a consultant with an annual salary of $46 million.

In October 2019, WeWork abandoned plans to open an office in the U.S. Steel Tower in downtown Pittsburgh. The company had planned to build out as much as 105,000 square feet in the building.

On October 14, 2019, WeWork warned clients that approximately 1,600 office phone booths at some of its offices in Canada and the United States were tainted with formaldehyde. The company said another 700 phone booths would possibly be taken out of service as a precautionary measure. This situation came to the attention of the company after some members reported eye irritation and a strong odor.

On November 6, 2019, SoftBank Group wrote-down $9.2 billion on its investments in WeWork, approximately 90% of the $10.3 billion SoftBank invested in WeWork. On November 21, 2019, WeWork announced layoffs of 2,400 employees, almost 20% of its workforce globally.

=== 2020 ===
In January 2020, WeWork began phasing out free beer at all North American co-working locations and announced plans for a slower growth rate. On February 1, 2020, WeWork announced that Sandeep Mathrani, a former senior executive at GGP Inc. and Brookfield Property Partners, would become CEO of the company, effective February 18, 2020. On February 3, 2020, WeWork opened its first location in the Middle East outside of Israel in Abu-Dhabi's technology park Hub 71 under the name WeWork x Hub 71.

In February 2020, the company began closing locations temporarily due to the COVID-19 pandemic. In late March 2020, WeWork laid off 250 employees in an effort to lower expenses, followed by another round of employee layoffs at the end of April 2020.

In April 2020, SoftBank, then the largest shareholder of WeWork, cancelled its $3 billion tender offer to buy shares directly from some of WeWork's other major stockholders, citing failure by WeWork to obtain certain regulatory approvals, new criminal and civil investigations, and required COVID-19 lockdowns as reasons for withdrawing the offer. SoftBank was then sued by WeWork and former CEO Adam Neumann. The lawsuits were settled in February 2021; terms were not disclosed.

In June 2020, McKelvey left WeWork.

In September 2020, the company sold a majority interest in its China business for $200 million.

In 2020, the company vacated 66 locations and negotiated lower rent, deferrals, or other lease changes at more than 150 others.

=== 2021 ===
In April 2021, WeWork was sued by landlord Walter & Samuels for breach of contract when it closed locations and failed to pay rent. WeWork then paid off its arrears but the landlord faced foreclosure after defaulting on the mortgage loan. In May 2021, WeWork was also sued by landlord Oxford Properties Group for failing to pay $1.8 million in rent.

In August 2021, WeWork was one of five co-working providers selected by the General Services Administration to provide services for the Federal government of the United States.

In October 2021, the company became a public company via a $9 billion merger with BowX Acquisition Corp., a special-purpose acquisition company, and shares of WeWork began trading on the New York Stock Exchange. Mathrani remained as CEO but Vivek Ranadivé from BowX and Deven Parekh from Insight Partners joined the new board of directors.

In October 2021, WeWork announced a partnership with Cushman & Wakefield that included a $150 million investment in WeWork.

=== 2022 ===
In January 2022, WeWork announced the acquisition of Common Desk.

In March 2022, due to the international sanctions during the Russian invasion of Ukraine, WeWork closed its offices in Russia. Later in 2022, the company announced that it was developing a software product with Yardi Systems called WeWork Workplace.

In May 2022, WeWork named Andre Fernandez as its CFO. He replaced Benjamin Dunham, who departed after 18 months at the company.

=== 2023 ===
In May 2023, facing financial trouble, the company exchanged its debt for debt with longer maturities, offering interest rates as high as 15.00%.

As of the end of June 2023, the firm had more than 700 locations in 39 countries worldwide. At the time, WeWork spent more than 80% of its revenue on rent and interest, paying over $2.7 billion a year.

By August 2023, with Chapter 11 bankruptcy imminent, the company hired Alvarez and Marsal to advise on a restructuring. It also received a cash infusion from BlackRock, King Street Capital Management, and Brigade Capital as part of a potential bankruptcy plan.

In November 2023, the company filed bankruptcy in the United States District Court for the District of New Jersey, listing liabilities of approximately $10 billion to $50 billion. The company also filed recognition proceedings in Canada under Part IV of the Companies' Creditors Arrangement Act. Locations outside the United States and Canada and WeWork franchisees were not part of the bankruptcy. SoftBank made a $1.5 billion payment to Goldman Sachs and other creditors days prior to WeWork's bankruptcy because SoftBank guaranteed WeWork's loans.

=== 2024 ===
On 30 May 2024, the company emerged from bankruptcy after a deal was reached with creditors and approved by the courts. The bankruptcy proceedings included a failed bid by Adam Neumann to buy the company for $500 million. Instead, Yardi Systems, a real estate technology provider and creditor to WeWork, invested $337 million, acquiring a 60% stake, and Anant Yardi was added to the board of directors of WeWork. An additional $113 million was invested by hedge funds in exchange for a 20% stake. John Santora, formerly an executive at Cushman & Wakefield, was appointed as CEO the following month. As part of the bankruptcy reorganization, the company eliminated $4 billion in debt, cancelled leases at about 160 of its 450 locations and amended more than 170 office leases.

In June 2024, WeWork sold its stake in WeWork India to Embassy Group, exiting the Indian market.

In December 2024, the company leased 304,000 square feet at 330 W. 34th Street in Manhattan, to be fully leased to Amazon.com, in one of the largest leases of Manhattan office space that year.

In the fourth quarter of 2024, the company reached break-even EBITDA for the first time, although it still was not profitable.

=== 2025 ===
In the first quarter of 2025, EBITDA was once again positive, but the company was still cash flow negative as it spent money to upgrade locations.

== Discrimination complaints by employees ==
In October 2018, former WeWork director of culture Ruby Anaya filed a sexual harassment lawsuit claiming that at a company event in January 2018, a male employee grabbed her by the waist and forcibly kissed her and that in August 2017, a different employee grabbed Anaya from behind in a "sexual manner". The suit highlighting the company's "frat-boy culture" also alleged that co-founder Neumann "plied [her] with tequila shots during her interview with the company." Shortly after this claim was made, WeWork put an end to its unlimited beer for employees and implemented a policy of only four beers per day in the New York office.

In June 2019, WeWork was sued by the former head of compensation, Lisa Bridges, for gender-based pay discrimination, particularly in granting stock options. She alleged that she was fired after discussing the issue.

Also, in June 2019, Richard Markel, a former WeWork executive making $300,000 per year, sued the company for age discrimination after allegedly being replaced with a younger worker. Markel voluntarily dismissed the case in August 2019.

In October 2019, Medina Bardhi, the former chief of staff for Adam Neumann, represented by Douglas Wigdor, sued the company over various allegations including a gender pay gap, marijuana use by company executives, and pregnancy discrimination.

In February 2020, Ayesha Whyte, former director of employee relations, sued WeWork for gender and race discrimination, "saying she was promised a well-paying job that never materialized, all while less-qualified white people were promoted." In June 2020, the lawsuit was forced into arbitration.

On July 8, 2020, former WeWork stock plan administrator Diane Allen, and former head of diversity & inclusion Christopher Clermont, filed separate complaints against WeWork, both alleging race discrimination, while Allen also alleged gender discrimination and lack of action over a sexual harassment claim. The lawsuit from Allen was sent to arbitration per her employment agreement.

== Notable locations ==
Notable WeWork locations include:

- 1600 Seventh Avenue
- 330 North Wabash
- 200 Spectrum Center Drive
- Bentall Centre
- Bush Tower
- Central Bank of Ireland
- Constellation Place
- Five Penn Center
- Holyoke Building
- Hôtel de Langeac
- Hotel Europejski
- Madison Belmont Building
- Manhattan Center
- One Nashville Place
- Salesforce Tower
- Totzeret HaAretz Towers
WeWork Jongno Tower in Seoul

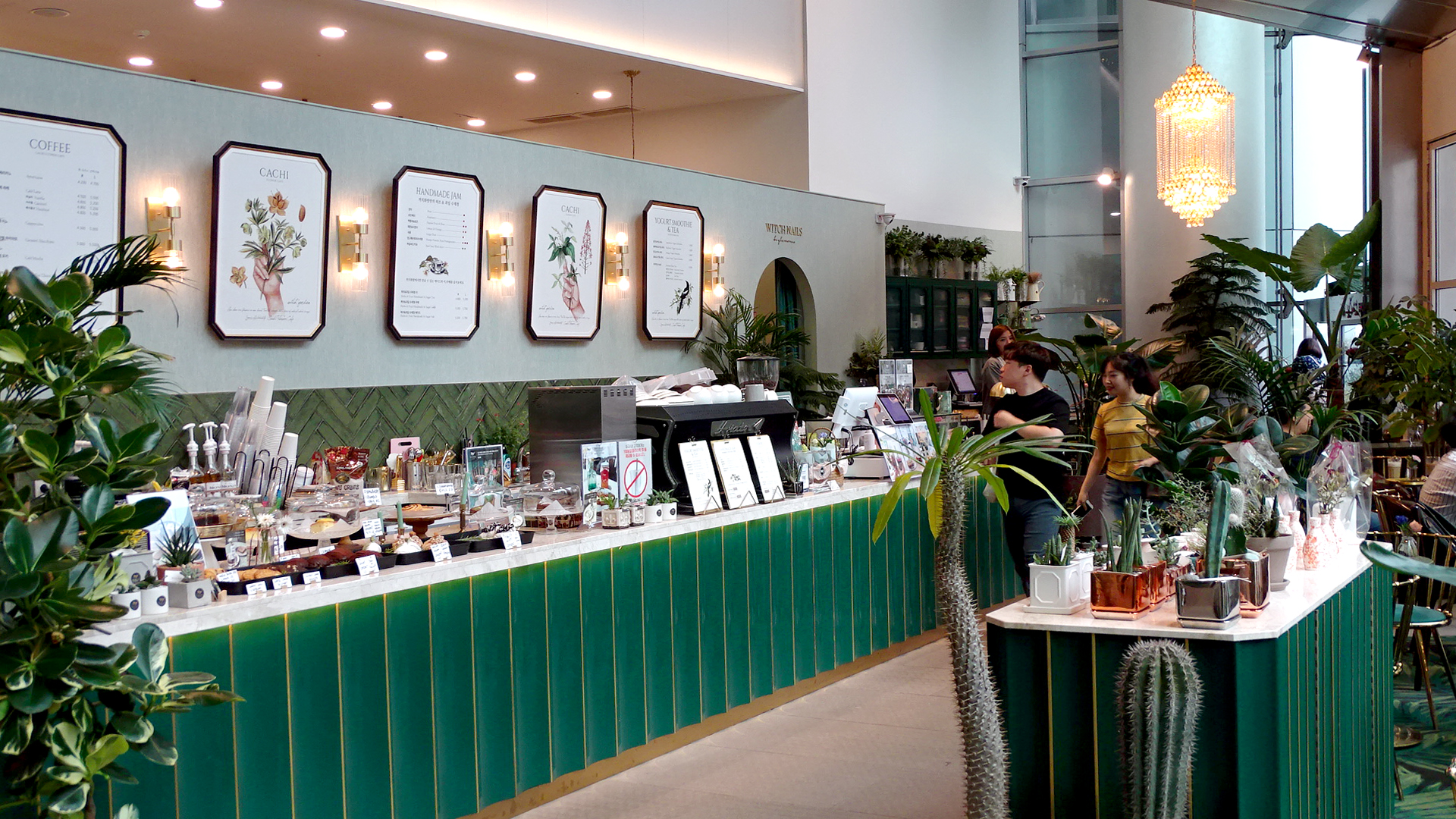
WeWork location at the Jongno Tower in Seoul

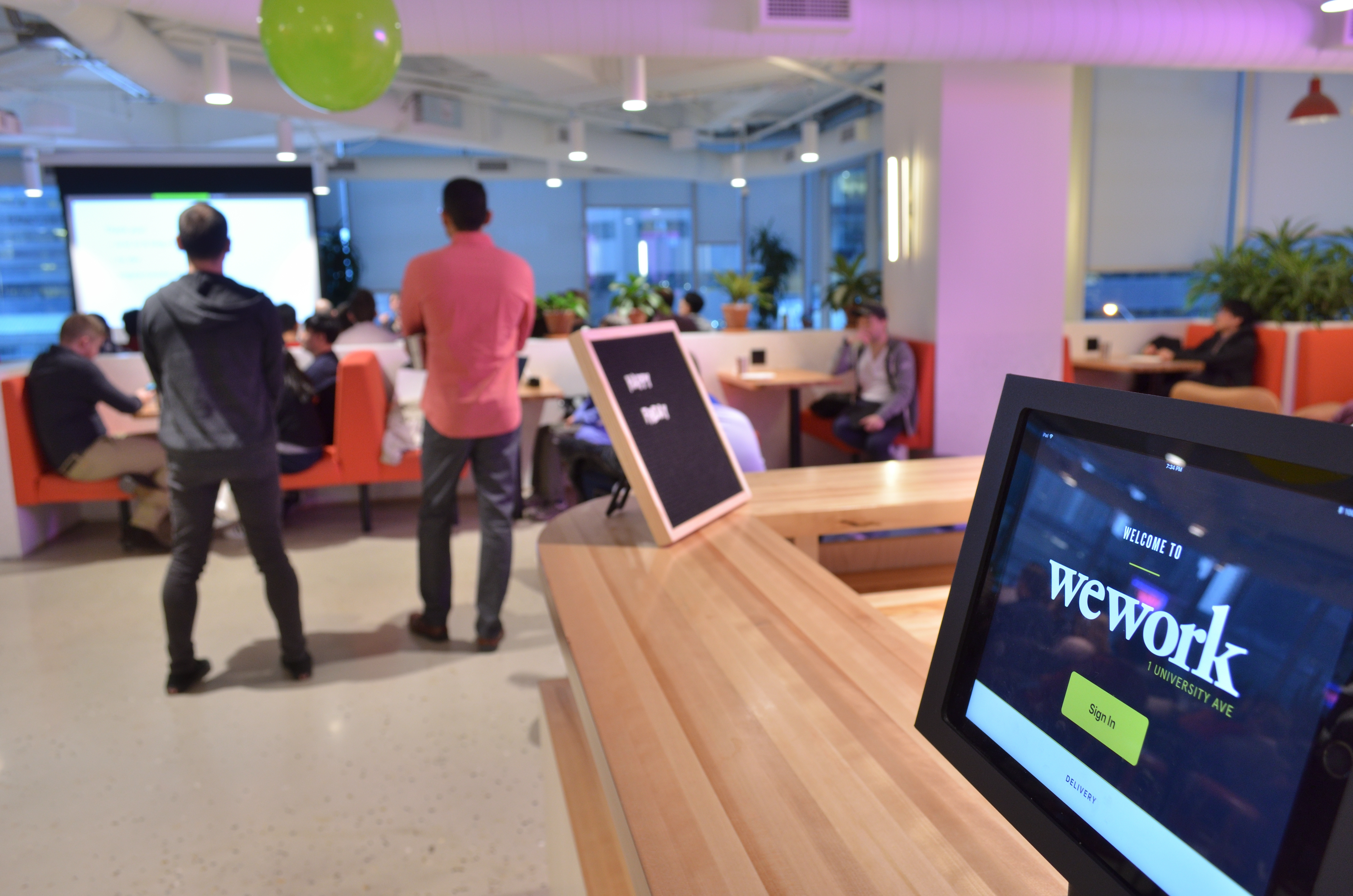
WeWork location, 1 University Avenue, Toronto

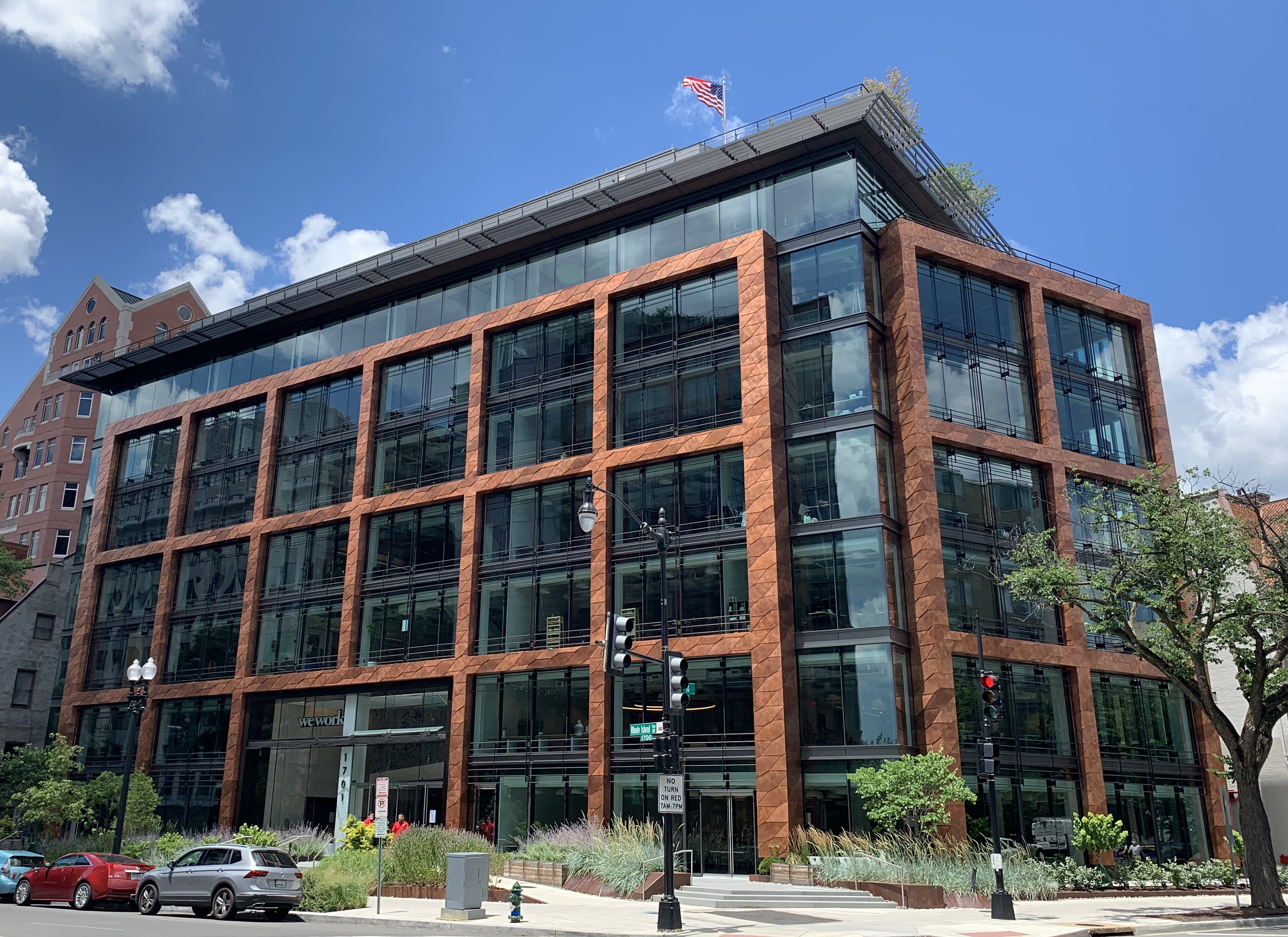
WeWork location on Rhode Island Avenue in Washington, D.C.

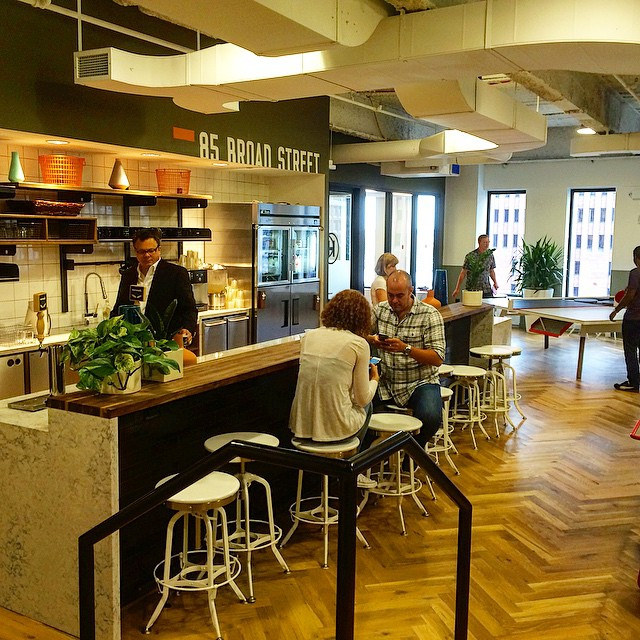
The kitchen area at the WeWork location on Broad Street in Manhattan

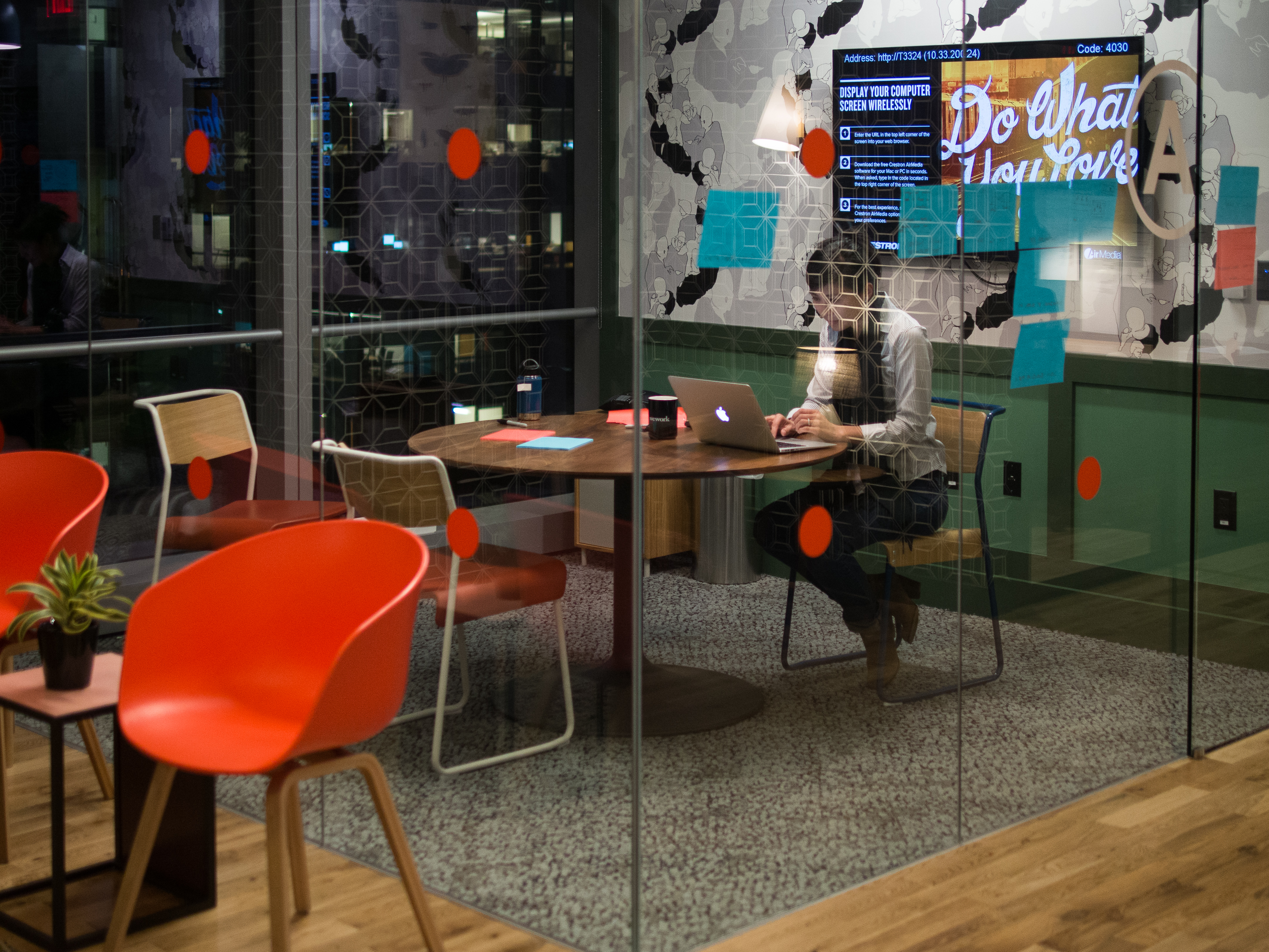
WeWork location in San Francisco

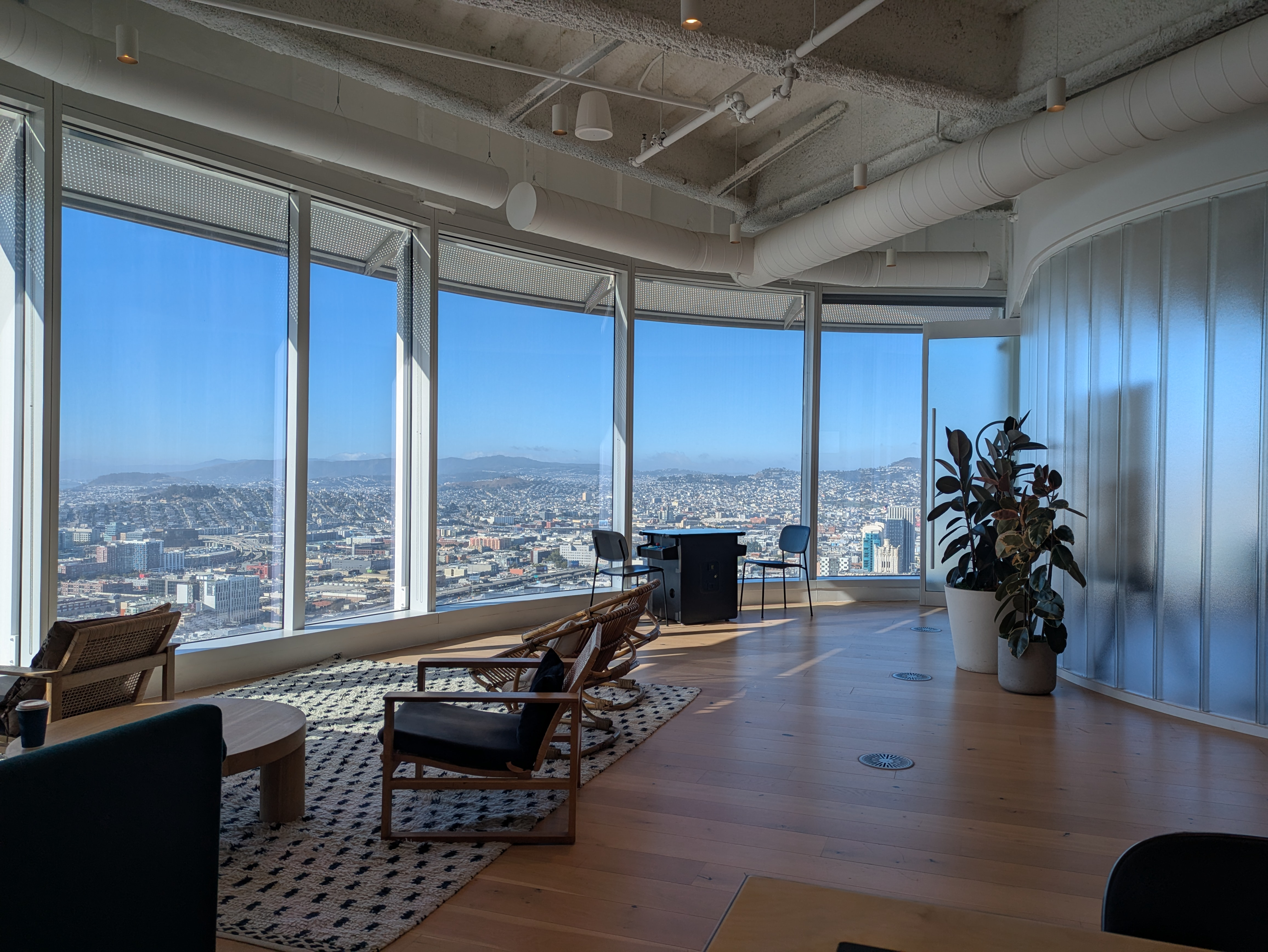
Location in the Salesforce Tower

== In the media ==
=== Visual media ===
In March 2022, Apple TV+ aired a miniseries, WeCrashed, that follows the launching and fall of WeWork, based on the Wondery podcast of the same name. The show is focused on the lives of the eccentric couple, Adam Neumann (played by Jared Leto) and Rebekah Neumann (played by Anne Hathaway).

In March 2021, Hulu unveiled a documentary titled WeWork: Or the Making and Breaking of a $47 Billion Unicorn, released April 2, 2021.

=== Books ===
- Wiedeman, Reeves (October 20, 2020). Billion Dollar Loser: The Epic Rise and Fall of WeWork: A Sunday Times Book of the Year. Hodder & Stoughton. ISBN 978-1-5293-8506-9.
- Brown, Eliot; Farrell, Maureen (July 22, 2021). The Cult of We: WeWork and the Great Start-Up Delusion. HarperCollins Publishers. ISBN 978-0-00-838941-3.
