= Adam Neumann =

Israeli-American businessman (born 1979)

- אדם נוימן
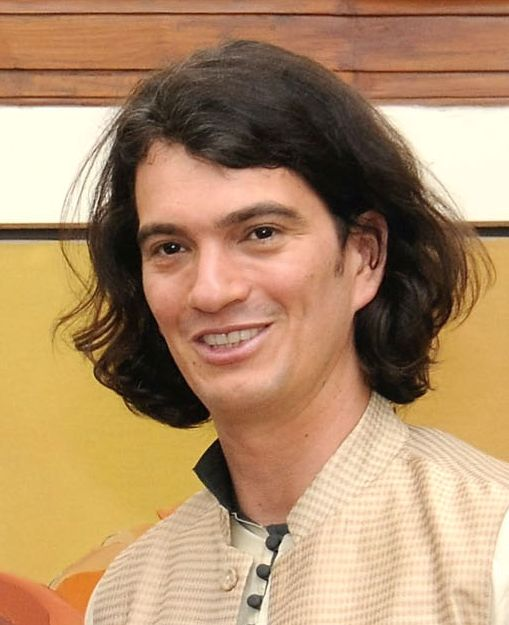
- Neumann in 2016
- Born: April 25, 1979 (age 47); Beersheba, Israel
- Education: Israeli Naval Academy; Baruch College (BA)
- Occupation: Businessman
- Known for: Co-founder, WeWork
- Spouse: Rebekah Neumann (m. 2008)
- Children: 6
- Relatives: Avi Yehiel (brother-in-law); Adi Neumann (sister)
- Military career
- Allegiance: Israel
- Branch: Israeli Navy
- Service years: 1996–2001
- Rank: Seren (Captain)

Adam Neumann (Hebrew: אדם נוימן) is an Israeli and American billionaire businessman. In 2010, he co-founded WeWork with Miguel McKelvey, where he was CEO from 2010 to 2019. In 2019, he co-founded a family office dubbed 166 2nd Financial Services with his wife, Rebekah Neumann, to manage their personal wealth, investing over a billion dollars in real estate and venture startups.

Following mounting pressure from investors based on disclosures made in a public offering filing, Neumann was asked to step down as CEO of WeWork and gave up majority voting control as of September 26, 2019. Forbes estimated his net worth at US$2.2 billion as of February 2024.

== Early life ==
Neumann was born on April 25, 1979 and raised in Beersheba, Israel. His parents divorced when he was seven, and he had lived in 13 different homes by the time he was 22. His younger sister Adi Neumann is a model and former Miss Teen Israel. He has dyslexia and could not read or write until he was in third grade.

In his teens, he lived on a kibbutz in southern Israel. He served as a junior officer in the Israeli Navy. He attended the Zicklin School of Business at Baruch College in New York City, where he dropped out shortly before completing his bachelor's degree in business in 2002, but returned to finish his degree in 2017.

== Business career ==
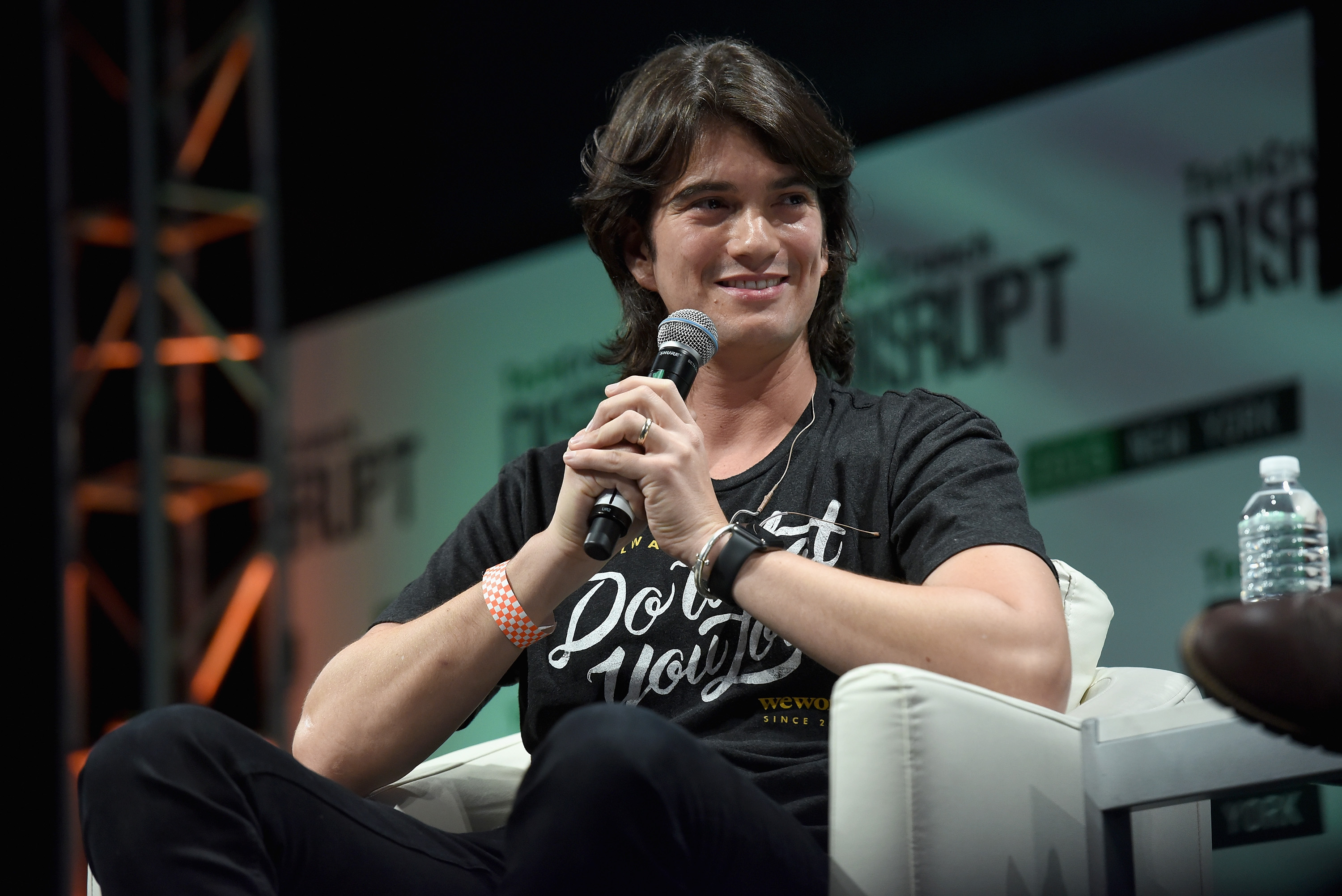
Neumann talking at TechCrunch, 2015

=== 2000–2010 ===
Before founding WeWork, Neumann founded a children's clothing company, Krawlers. Neumann and Miguel McKelvey began working together, having met through a mutual friend, on Green Desk in 2008, a shared-workspace business focusing on sustainability, the precursor to WeWork. The pair sold their interest in Green Desk and using the funds along with a $15 million investment from Brooklyn real estate developer Joel Schreiber for a 33% interest in the company, they founded WeWork in 2010. Neumann stated that with WeWork, he intended to replicate the feeling of togetherness and belonging he felt in Israel and that he thought was lacking in the West.

Neumann was awarded the EY Entrepreneur of the Year in 2015.

=== 2011–2020 ===
On September 22, 2019, there were reports, from outlets such as The Wall Street Journal, that various WeWork directors were planning on asking Neumann to step down as CEO, after "a tumultuous week in which his eccentric behavior and drug use came to light" before a planned IPO. The Wall Street Journal reported that he had taken $700 million out of WeWork before the IPO, among other details, and "undermined his position" at the company. Neumann also directed We Holdings LLC (a company managed by Neumann and McKelvey) to unwind the transaction of $5.9 million in stock that the company paid in exchange for the "We" trademarks. On September 24, 2019, he resigned and Artie Minson and Sebastian Gunningham were named as successors.

In October 2019, The Wall Street Journal reported that Neumann would receive close to $1.7 billion from stakeholder SoftBank for stepping down from WeWork's board and severing most of his ties to the company. Weeks later, minority shareholders filed a lawsuit against Neumann and other WeWork officials for breach of its fiduciary duties.

=== 2021–present ===
On February 24, 2021, The Wall Street Journal reported that Neumann had received about $130 million of the $185 million in consulting fees agreed to be paid by SoftBank before SoftBank ceased making the remainder of the payments to him. On May 27, 2021, the Wall Street Journal reported the terms of a renegotiated severance package between Neumann and SoftBank, replacing that from October 2019. Among other terms, Neumann received $106 million in cash in addition to the $92.5 million in consulting fees previously received (in contrast to the $130 million figure reported by the WSJ on February 24, 2021, for previously received consulting fees from SoftBank), with about $50 million of that to pay for his legal fees. The renegotiated settlement package also "let him refinance $432 million in debt on favorable terms and allowed an entity Mr. Neumann controls to sell $578 million in WeWork stock." The Wall Street Journal also reported that Neumann received a new WeWork stock award of "roughly $245 million," but "if the price [of WeWork] falls below $10 [per share], Mr. Neumann is ineligible to receive the stock award." The May 2021 securities disclosure filings were made "as WeWork completes a merger with BowX Acquisition, a special-purpose acquisition company."

On April 12, 2020, Forbes listed his net worth at US$750 million, having dropped off the Forbes's billionaires list that year. Following WeWork's SPAC merger to become a public company in 2021, Bloomberg Billionaires Index estimated his net worth at $2.3 billion. He returned to the Forbes's billionaires list in 2022. As of February 2024, his net worth is listed at $2.2 billion.

As of March 2022, Neumann has shifted focus to property investing in Miami. In August, it was announced that Andreessen Horowitz had invested in Neumann's new residential real-estate company, Flow. As of 2025, the company manages and rents six properties in Florida and Saudi Arabia.

In May 2022, Neumann was reported as being behind Flowcarbon, a start-up tokenizing carbon credit trading platform that runs on blockchain.

In February 2024 Neumann attempted to buy-back WeWork, as his former company attempted to emerge from bankruptcy. Three months later the deal was abandoned.

In May 2024, Neumann acquired Whalebone, a bimonthly lifestyle magazine based in Montauk, New York. The magazine was founded in 2010 and following the sale renamed to Flow Trip.

In October 2024, Flow announced a coworking business called Workflow. It would use space in buildings that Flow owns or manage space for other landlords, and would not sign long-term leases.

== Investments ==
=== Companies ===
In 2018, Neumann became a partner of InterCure, an Israeli cannabis company led by Ehud Barak, former Prime Minister of Israel and invested in EquityBee, a start-up for tech investors, and Selina, a hospitality company. In early 2020, Neumann invested US$10 million into multimodal shared mobility company GOTO Global, taking a 33% equity stake in the company.

=== Property ===
In 2012, Neumann partnered with Ken Horn of Alchemy Properties and Joel Schreiber and purchased for US$68 million the top floors of the Woolworth Building, which they then converted into condominiums.

As CEO, Neumann on multiple occasions purchased buildings and then leased the space back to WeWork. Observers noted this as a potential conflict of interest and one that would not be allowed if WeWork were a public company. During his tenure as CEO of WeWork, Neumann also purchased US$90 million worth of residences, including a 60-acre (24 ha) estate in Westchester County, New York, a 6,000-square-foot (560 m^{2}) condominium near Gramercy Park, two homes in The Hamptons, and a US$21 million mansion in Corte Madera, California.

Neumann launched Flow, a residential real estate startup funded by the venture capital firm Andreessen Horowitz, in August 2022.

== Legal and business challenges ==
According to The Wall Street Journal, Neumann chartered a Gulfstream G650 for a trip from the United States to Israel during the summer of 2018. Neumann and his friends spent much of the flight smoking marijuana. After landing in Israel, the flight crew found a cereal box stuffed with marijuana and reported it to the jet owner. Fearing a marijuana trafficking incident, the jet's owner ordered it to return to the US without the passengers, with Neumann and his entourage having to return on a separate flight.

In January 2021 Neumann retained top defamation lawyer Tom Clare to defend his reputation.

In May 2023, The Spectator published an article claiming Neumann defrauded WeWork investors and compared him to Elizabeth Holmes, an entrepreneur convicted of wire fraud in 2022, which Neumann said was defamatory. He requested and received a retraction stating that the article was amended to clarify that Adam Neumann did not deliberately mislead investors or break any law.

== Philanthropy ==
In 2017, Neumann and his wife donated $1 million to the "Be the Match Registry" of the National Marrow Donor Program.

== Personal life ==
Neumann married Rebekah Neumann in 2008. He lives in the Greenwich Village neighborhood of New York City with his wife and their six children.

He has spoken of observing Shabbat with his family every week and the role Judaism has played in his personal and professional growth.

Neumann is known to frequently appear barefoot in public; this habit was depicted in the TV series WeCrashed.

== Claims and statements ==
The Wall Street Journal reported in 2019 that Neumann had aspirations to live forever, become the world's first trillionaire, expand WeWork to the planet Mars, become Israel's prime minister, and become "president of the world". A September 2019 Vanity Fair article reported that Neumann claimed to have convinced Rahm Emanuel to run for the presidency of the United States, used JPMorgan Chase's CEO Jamie Dimon as his personal banker, convinced Saudi prince Mohammed bin Salman to improve the standing of women in Saudi Arabia, and had been working with Jared Kushner on the Trump administration's peace plan for the Israeli–Palestinian conflict.

== In popular culture ==
Time magazine named Neumann as one of the 100 most influential people of 2018.

Neumann is a primary focus of the nonfiction book Billion Dollar Loser (2020). In the Apple TV+ series WeCrashed (2022), Neumann is portrayed by Jared Leto.

In 2022, The New York Times won an Emmy Award for DealBook Summit: One-on-One With Adam Neumann, a live interview hosted by Andrew Ross Sorkin.

The HBO docuseries Generation Hustle produced an episode titled "Cult of WeWork" about the Neumanns’ leadership at WeWork. The characterization of the show as being about scammers caused the Neumanns to pursue legal action against HBO. As a result, HBO changed their characterization and removed its true crime listing. According to Deadline Hollywood, this was the only episode in the ten-part series where "the subject matter hasn't been charged or accused of breaking an actual law or, in many cases, served time."

== See also ==
- List of barefooters
- List of Israelis by net worth
