= List of acquisitions by Disney =

The Walt Disney Company was founded in 1923 and since the 1990s has acquired many properties to increase its size in the media industry. The table shows the most substantial and important mergers and acquisitions that Disney has made over the years.

== Acquisitions ==
| | Acquired company | Date | Country | Price (US$) | Price Adjusted for Inflation (US$) | Parent/Merged With | References |
|---|---|---|---|---|---|---|---|
| 1. | Disneyland, Inc. | 1957 (64% controlling stake) | USA | 562,500 | 6,000,000 | Disney Parks, Experiences and Products | |
| 1. | Disneyland, Inc. | 1960 (remaining shares) | USA | 7,500,000 | 82,000,000 | Disney Parks, Experiences and Products | |
| 2. | WED Enterprises (park designing and engineering division) | 1965 | USA | | | Disney Parks, Experiences and Products | |
| 3. | Retlaw Enterprises (parks transportation division) | 1982 | USA | 42,600,000 | 142,000,000 | Disney Parks, Experiences and Products | |
| 4. | Wrather Corporation | 1987 (50% share) | USA | | | Disney Parks, Experiences and Products | |
| 4. | Wrather Corporation | 1988 (remaining 50%) | USA | | | Disney Parks, Experiences and Products | |
| 5. | Miramax Films | June 30, 1993 | USA | 60,000,000 | 134,000,000 | The Walt Disney Studios | |
| 6. | Capital Cities/ABC Inc. | February 9, 1996 | USA | 19,000,000,000 | 3.9004×10^{10} | Disney General Entertainment Content | |
| 7. | Jumbo Pictures | February 29, 1996 | USA | | | Walt Disney Television | |
| 8. | Dream Quest Images | April 1996 | USA | | | Walt Disney Feature Animation | |
| 9. | Toysmart | August 1996 | USA | | | Disney Interactive | |
| 10. | Starwave | April 30, 1998 | USA | 400,000,000 | 790,000,000 | Go.com | |
| 11. | Infoseek | July 12, 1999 | USA | 1,770,000,000 | 3.421×10^{9} | Go.com | |
| 12. | ABC Family Worldwide | October 24, 2001 | USA | 2,900,000,000 | 5.273×10^{9} | Disney Entertainment Television | |
| 13. | The Baby Einstein Company | November 6, 2001 | USA | | | The Walt Disney Company | |
| 14. | The Muppets and Bear in the Big Blue House | February 17, 2004 | USA | 75,000,000 | 128,000,000 | The Muppets Studio | |
| 15. | Avalanche Software | April 19, 2005 | USA | | | Disney Interactive Studios | |
| 16. | Living Mobile | October 19, 2005 | Germany | | | Walt Disney Internet Group | |
| 17. | Pixar | May 5, 2006 | USA | 7,400,000,000 | 1.1818×10^{10} | Walt Disney Studios | |
| 18. | Climax Racing | September 2006 | UK | | | Disney Interactive Studios | |
| 19. | Junction Point Studios | February 8, 2007 | USA | | | Disney Interactive Studios | |
| 20. | New Horizon Interactive | August 2007 | Canada | 350,000,000 | 543,000,000 | Disney Interactive Studios | |
| 21. | Gamestar | February 2009 | China | | | Disney Interactive Studios | |
| 22. | Kerpoof | February 2009 | USA | | | Disney.com | |
| 23. | Wideload Games | September 8, 2009 | USA | | | Disney Interactive Studios | |
| 24. | Marvel Entertainment | December 31, 2009 | USA | 4,400,000,000 | 6.603×10^{9} | The Walt Disney Company | |
| 25. | Tapulous | July 1, 2010 | USA | | | Disney Mobile | |
| 26. | Playdom | August 27, 2010 | USA | 563,000,000 | 790,000,000 | Disney Interactive | |
| 27. | Rocket Pack | March 2011 | Finland | | | Disney Interactive Studios | |
| 28. | Babble Media | November 2011 | USA | | | Disney Consumer Products | |
| 29. | UTV Software Communications | January 31, 2012 | India | 450,000,000 | 631,000,000 | The Walt Disney Company India | |
| 30. | StudioEX | December 10, 2012 | South Korea | | | Disney Interactive | |
| 31. | Lucasfilm | December 21, 2012 | USA | 4,050,000,000 | 5.680×10^{9} | Walt Disney Studios | |
| 32. | Maker Studios | March 24, 2014 | USA | 500,000,000 | 680,000,000 | Disney Digital Network | |
| 33. | BAMTech Media | 2016 | USA | 2,930,000,000 | 3.931×10^{9} | Disney Streaming | |
| 34. | Euro Disney SCA | June 19, 2017 | France | 760,000,000 | 998,000,000 | Disney Parks, Experiences and Products | |
| 35. | 21st Century Fox (entertainment assets, cable networks and international networks) | March 20, 2019 | USA | 71,300,000,000 | 8.9786×10^{10} | The Walt Disney Company | |
| 36. | Hulu | April 16, 2019 (AT&T's 10% stake) | USA | 1,430,000,000 | 1.801×10^{9} | Disney Streaming | |
| 36. | Hulu | December 1, 2023 (Comcast's 33% stake) | USA | 8,610,000,000 | 9.098×10^{9} | Disney Streaming | |
| 37. | Epic Games | February 7, 2024 (9% equity stake) | USA | 1,500,000,000 | 1.539×10^{9} | The Walt Disney Company | |
| 38. | Webtoon Entertainment | September 17, 2025 (2% controlling stake) | South Korea | | | The Walt Disney Company | |
| 39. | FuboTV | October 29, 2025 (70% controlling stake) | USA | 220,000,000 | 220,000,000 | Disney Streaming | |
| 40. | NFL Network and NFL RedZone | January 31, 2026 | USA | 30,000,000 | 30,000,000 | ESPN Inc. | |

== Divestments ==
| Target company | Acquirer | Date of sale | Price of sale | Price Adjusted for sale | References |
|---|---|---|---|---|---|
| KCAL-TV | Young Broadcasting | May 14, 1996 | 385,000,000 | 790,000,000 | |
| Farm Progress | Rural Press | July 1, 1997 | | | |
| Fairchild Publications | Advance Publications | August 20, 1999 | 650,000,000 | 1.256×10^{9} | |
| DIC Entertainment | Andy Heyward; Bain Capital; Chase Capital Partners | November 25, 2000 | | | |
| Dimension Films | The Weinstein Company | 2005 | | | |
| ABC Radio Networks | Citadel Broadcasting | June 12, 2007 | | | |
| GMTV | ITV plc | November 26, 2009 | 22,250,000 | 36,000,000 | |
| Power Rangers and entertainment assets | Saban Brands | May 12, 2010 | 43,000,000 | 63,000,000 | |
| Miramax Films | Filmyard Holdings | December 3, 2010 | 663,000,000 | 979,000,000 | |
| The Baby Einstein Company | Kids II, Inc. | October 14, 2013 | | | |
| Avalanche Software | Warner Bros. Interactive Entertainment | January 24, 2017 | | | |
| Fox Sports Networks | Sinclair Broadcast Group; Entertainment Studios | August 22, 2019 | 10,600,000,000 | 1.3348×10^{10} | |
| FoxNext Games | Scopely | January 22, 2020 | | | |
| Endemol Shine Group | Banijay | July 3, 2020 | 2,200,000,000 | 2.737×10^{9} | |
| TrueX | Gimbal, Inc. | September 28, 2020 | | | |
| TeleColombia | ViacomCBS | November 23, 2021 | | | |
| KRDC | Calvary Chapel Costa Mesa | June 13, 2023 | 5,000,000 | 5,000,000 | |
| A+E Global Media | Hearst Communications | August 4, 2026 | 1,200,000 | 1,000,000 | |

== See also ==
- Acquisition of 21st Century Fox by Disney
