= Potential acquisition of Disney by Apple =

Speculated corporate acquisition

The logos of the Walt Disney Company and Apple Inc.

Since the 2000s, there has been persistent and periodic speculation of a potential acquisition of the Walt Disney Company, an American media conglomerate, by Apple Inc., an American technology company. Despite there being no evidence of such plans, the notion has been routinely suggested by analysts and pundits and repeatedly dismissed by both companies.

Apple and Disney have historically shared a close relationship, largely due to Disney's collaboration and subsequent acquisition of Pixar, which was owned by Apple founder Steve Jobs, and the subsequent friendship between Jobs and Disney CEO Bob Iger. Rumors have surfaced periodically since then, including when the Trump administration proposed a tax reform program in 2017, when the COVID-19 pandemic caused Disney's stock to sink to historic lows in 2020, and when Iger returned as CEO in 2022 after a two-year hiatus.

Advocates of the theory argue that a merger would complement both companies and allow Apple to strengthen its entertainment ventures, while dissenters point to the two companies' dissimilar business approaches, likely regulatory scrutiny, and the cost of such an acquisition as evidence neither side is interested in a merger. Executives from Apple and Disney have been presented with these rumors, with both sides denying that a deal is in the works. Various publications have cited insiders and Disney employees' beliefs that Iger intends to eventually sell the company to Apple.

== Background ==
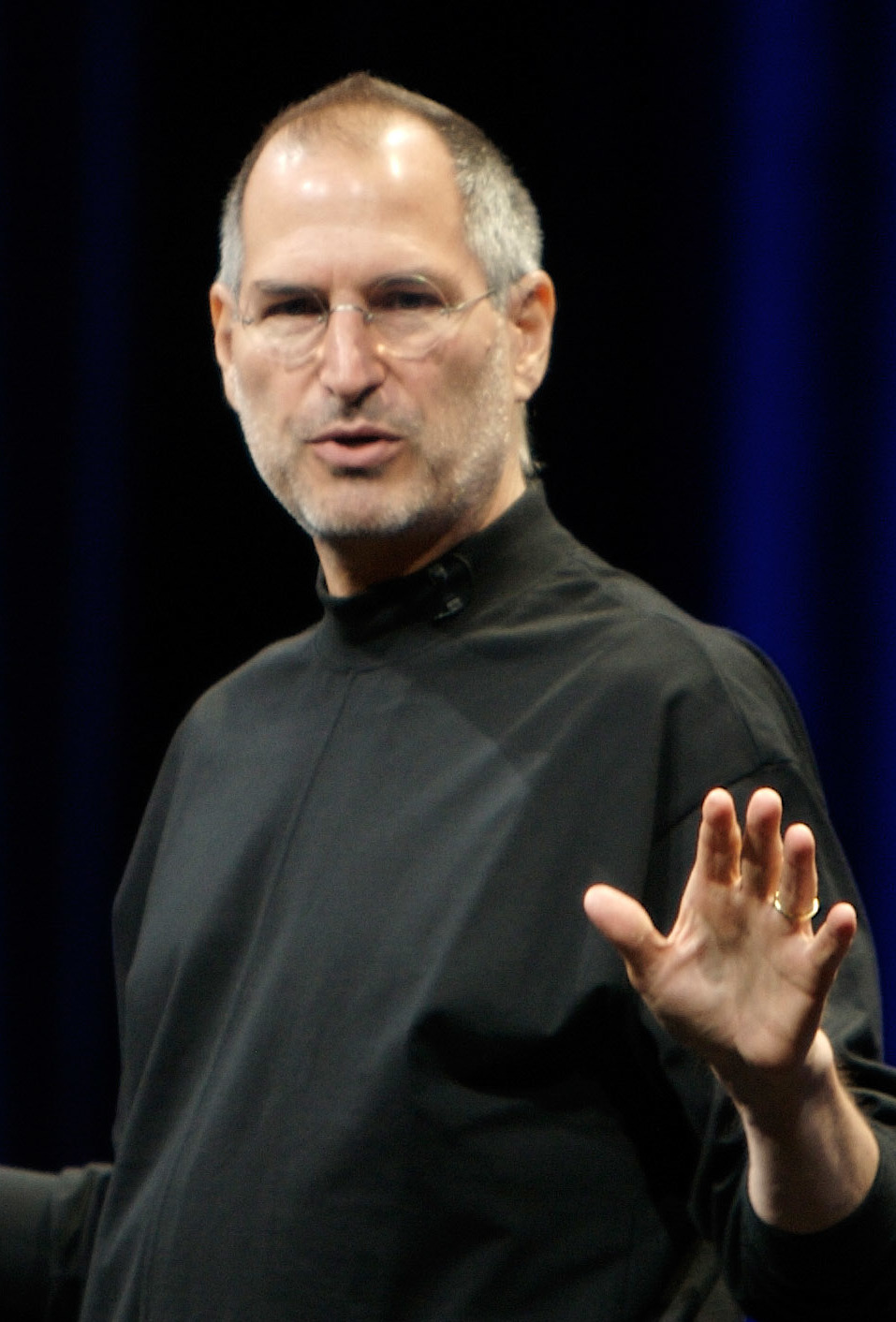
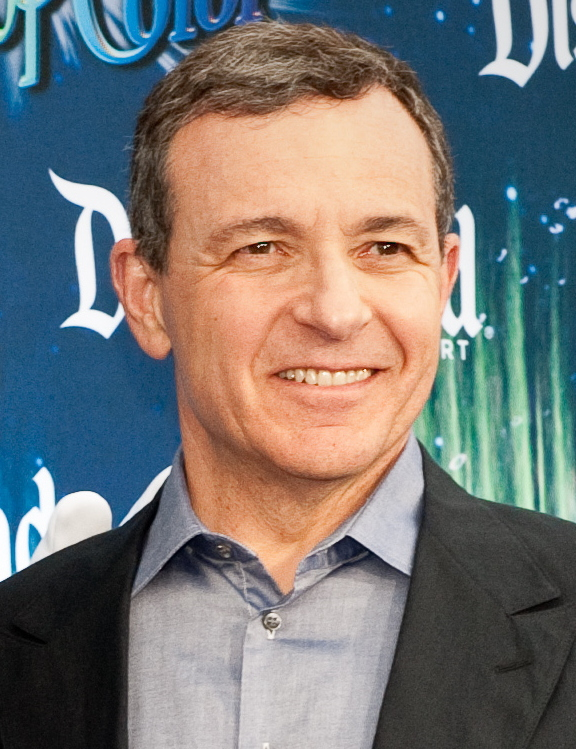
Steve Jobs (L) and Bob Iger (R) were close friends

Apple Inc. is an American technology company co-founded by Steve Jobs, specializing in consumer electronics and information technology. It is the largest company in the world by market capitalization and one of the Big Four technology companies of Silicon Valley. The Walt Disney Company is an American mass media and entertainment conglomerate co-founded by Walt Disney, specializing in film production and theme parks. It is the largest entertainment company in the world, operating one of the Big Five film studios of Hollywood (Walt Disney Studios) and the world's largest amusement park company (Disney Parks).

Since the turn of the 21st century, the two companies have shared a strong business relationship. Pixar Animation Studios, a film studio owned by Jobs, began collaborating with Walt Disney Pictures on computer-animated feature films starting with Toy Story in 1995, culminating in Disney's acquisition of Pixar in 2006. This had followed a skirmish between Jobs and then–Disney CEO Michael Eisner over distribution arrangements, which led to a falling out between the two companies until Bob Iger's ascension as CEO in 2005. As a result of the merger, Jobs became Disney's largest individual shareholder and joined Disney's board of directors.

Iger and Jobs developed a close friendship: Disney was the first studio to sell its films and television series on Apple's iTunes platform, while Iger consulted Jobs when revamping the Disney Store and purchasing Marvel Entertainment. TheWrap called the two companies "Hollywood's best friends with benefits" and an "informal corporate couple". After Jobs died in 2011, Iger was invited to Apple's board of directors, on which he served as a member until his resignation in 2019, when the two companies' business interests overlapped for the first time with the launch of Disney+ competitor Apple TV+. In his memoir The Ride of a Lifetime: Lessons Learned from 15 Years as CEO of the Walt Disney Company, Iger remarked that if Jobs were still alive, their two companies might have combined.

== History ==
=== 2006–2017: Early speculation ===
Analysts and pundits have long theorized that Apple could or should acquire Disney, either in part or as a whole. The speculation dates back to the days of Disney's collaboration with Pixar, especially after Disney purchased the company. One month after the buyout in February 2006, Barron's reported that Apple could "make a bid to buyout [sic] Disney", regurgitating the rumor in October 2010. Speculation especially intensified after Iger became a board member of Apple. A decade earlier, in 1998, rumors had circulated of a possible takeover of Apple by Disney, a combination industry insiders viewed as "a natural fit".

Francis McInerney of consulting firm North River Ventures told The Washington Post in 2014 that an Apple–Disney merger was "frighteningly obvious" due to the two companies' similar corporate cultures and lack of overlap, believing that such a merger would benefit both sides. However, the Post pointed out Apple's tendency not to make large corporate acquisitions, in addition to potential regulatory scrutiny. In 2016, Liberty Media chairman John Malone speculated in an interview with CNBC that Apple could be interested in purchasing Disney if they spun off ESPN to alleviate costs; in 2017, hedge fund Margate Capital founder Samantha Greenberg wrote that Disney was a "logical acquisition target" for Apple.

=== 2017–2020: Trump tax reform ===
In March 2017, speculation once again ran rampant regarding a possible acquisition of Disney by Apple, fueled by investment bank RBC Capital Markets's claims that such a merger could happen, albeit with a low likelihood. RBC reasoned that this "[made] sense strategically" to complement Apple's struggling foray into the media industry and compete with Netflix, noting that it would significantly accrete Apple's earnings. However, the firm acknowledged that a deal was contingent on the fate of the Trump administration's tax reform program, the Tax Cuts and Jobs Act, which proposed a tax holiday on the repatriation of offshore capital. Apple CEO Tim Cook's comments the year prior refusing to rule out larger acquisitions further heightened these rumors. Still, CNBC's Tae Kim dismissed the suggestion as "far-fetched", while Todd Spangler of Variety cautioned that investors might demur to such a costly purchase. Nelson Wu of Investment advisory firm Open Square Capital believed Apple could have "the capacity to manage both companies", while TheStreet's Jim Cramer and Gene Munster of Loup Ventures cast doubt on the deal materializing. The Wall Street Journal called the idea a "fairy tale".

Rumors continued to swirl in the ensuing months and years. In May 2017, investment bank Citigroup named Disney as one of seven potential targets Apple could take over, once again citing the Trump tax bill and Apple's strategic fit. This analysis predated to Disney's announcement that it would acquire 21st Century Fox, with Citi placing the likelihood of an Apple–Disney merger at 20–30 percent. Paul R. La Monica of CNN Business wrote that while Apple certainly had the financial wherewithal to purchase Disney, it was unlikely they would be willing to do so due to Disney's high market value. Forbes senior contributor Chuck Jones arrived at the same conclusion after calculating the two companies' projected earnings per share in 2020 and estimating the costs of a hypothetical transaction. Writing for The Conversation in January 2018, associate professors Danielle Logue of the University of Technology Sydney and Charlene Zietsma of the Pennsylvania State University wrote off the rumors as "pure fantasy", considering most of Disney's assets would not fit Apple's portfolio, but acknowledged that a merger would prove vastly beneficial to Apple's sluggish Apple TV sales.

Apple senior vice president Eddy Cue was asked by CNN's Dylan Byers at South by Southwest (SXSW) in March 2018 whether Apple would consider acquiring Disney or Netflix. Cue responded by quoting hockey player Wayne Gretzky: "Skate to where the puck is going, not where it has been", indicating that Apple preferred to invest in up-and-coming ventures rather than established players. After Iger's memoir in 2019, Spangler reminded spectators that there was no guarantee Iger's aspirations would have actually occurred, while Lightshed Partners analysts outlined why they believed Apple was unlikely to be interested in combining with Disney due to their differing business approaches.

=== 2020–2023: Power shuffle ===
In March 2020, the COVID-19 pandemic erupted, wreaking havoc in every single industry, including on the American film industry and the theme park business. Virtually all segments of Disney were affected by the health crisis, with the company forced to shut down its film and television production units as well as close down its parks across the globe. Consequently, Disney suffered immense losses and the company's stock plummeted, leading analyst Bernie McTernan of Rosenblatt Securities to suggest Apple seize the opportunity to acquire Disney. Writing for Comic Book Resources, Peter Foy opined that Apple acquiring Disney would be disastrous, citing the potential for Disney to further consolidate its control over the media landscape and create a homogeneous market. As Apple TV+ continued to struggle, Brandon Katz of The New York Observer encouraged Apple to acquire Disney in March 2021. Throughout 2022, Cook continued not to rule out any large acquisitions in the future, but reaffirmed his company's focus on acquiring intellectual property and talent.

On the eve of the pandemic, Iger had retired as CEO, with Bob Chapek named as his successor. The transition was not a smooth one, and the pair had a falling out over Chapek's handling of several public relations crises. Chapek also drew ire from "fans, studio talent, executives, employees, Wall Street, [and] the company's board", ultimately leading to his ousting by the board in November 2022, with Iger in his place. Iger later cited Jobs as the principal influence for his decision to return. Upon Iger's return to power, Disney insiders told TheWrap that Iger was privately seeking to sell the company to Apple or another company as an endgame; CNBC would later cite "more than a dozen past and present Disney executives" in 2023 echoing this claim. When asked about this report in an employee town hall meeting, Iger dismissed it as "pure speculation". Former ESPN president John Skipper also suggested that Apple might purchase Disney, a rumor Byers, now working for Puck, dispelled. Rumors of a sale resurfaced in March 2023, when investment bank Needham's Laura Martin urged Apple to strike a deal to grow its subscription video on demand streaming business. In response, José Adorno of Boy Genius Report wrote that Apple would likely choose not to make large purchases that would raise antitrust concerns, especially considering the regulatory scrutiny it was already facing.

=== 2023–present: Changing landscape ===
In June 2023, Apple's launch of the Vision Pro mixed reality headset reignited Wall Street's speculation, with Iger appearing onstage at the Worldwide Developers Conference to announce Disney had partnered with Apple to bring Disney+ and other virtual reality content to the Vision Pro. Martin doubled down on her previous claims, claiming that Apple needed to purchase Disney to ensure the Vision Pro becomes a success and that Disney would be acquired within the next three years. The next month, Bloomberg News reported that Iger was looking to sell Disney's television assets amidst a diminishing linear television landscape after he implied so in an interview with CNBC, naming Apple as a potential suitor. Industry analyst Grace Randolph echoed the rumor, adding that she was opposed to the prospect of Disney losing its independence.

A report from The Hollywood Reporter in August of that year legitimized the age-old rumors for the first time, with the publication citing an anonymous "observer" who claimed Iger was indeed preparing for a sale and that Apple was the most logical buyer. At the same time, Professor Anthony Sabino of St. John's University offered a counterargument, believing that the board's actions gave no indication of a potential sell-off and pointing out the anticipated outcry from regulators and shareholders. An "exasperated" Iger declined to comment when pressed by Guggenheim Partners investor Michael Morris during Disney's quarterly earnings investor call later that day, an incident 9to5Mac's Zac Hall deemed a "waste of everyone's time". His colleague Ben Lovejoy remained skeptical of Apple buying the entirety of Disney, but conceded that recent circumstances made a partial sale a possibility. Jason Snell of Macworld agreed, writing that the prospect no longer seemed implausible as it once did. Inc. columnist Jason Aten and CNBC journalist Alex Sherman were more firm, believing that cultural, strategic, and regulatory issues made a merger impossible. Sherman further noted that Apple had demonstrated no interest in operating Disney's businesses and warned that a merger would only lead to "immense value destruction".

Meanwhile, analyst Daniel Ives of Wedbush Securities believed it was logical for Apple to acquire ESPN, asserting that it was "more attractive" than Disney as a whole. He later insisted that the acquisition was a "matter of when, not if", while KeyBanc Capital Markets analyst Brandon Nispel believed Apple would wait for Disney's valuations to lower. Writing for Bloomberg and Forbes, respectively, Dave Lee and Tim Bajarin rejected this theory, with Lee arguing that a partnership between the two companies was the more likely outcome and Bajarin contending that Apple would not be interested in a purchase. Tim Baysinger of Axios called the persistence of these rumors a troubling sign of Disney's state of vulnerability.

In an interview with the Financial Times, Bob Iger revealed that this had been seriously discussed both internally and with Apple itself, but Apple had shown no interest.

== See also ==
- List of mergers and acquisitions by Apple
- List of acquisitions by Disney
