= WebChat Broadcasting System =

Virtual community

- Logo used by WBS from c. October 1997 to its merger with Go.com on 15 September 1999.
- Website type: Web chat, message board, hosting service
- Available in: English
- Website: wbs.net (archived)
- Commercial: Yes
- Registration: Yes, required.
- Current status: Original site closed down; incorporated into Go.com.

WebChat Broadcasting System, or WBS for short, was a virtual community created during the 1990s. Supported by online advertising, it was one of few services at the time to offer free integrated community services including chat rooms, message boards, and free personal web pages. Extremely popular during the mid to late 1990s in the era prior to the Dot-com bust, WBS was at that time the largest and best-known social media website on the internet. In 1998, WBS was acquired by the search engine Infoseek, which was in turn acquired by Disney/ABC. The original WebChat Broadcasting System closed on 15 September 1999 after its chat rooms were integrated into Disney's existing Go Network chat rooms. A revived version of WBS existed from 2009 to 2023.

== Features ==
WBS featured browser-based chat, real-time discussion, with moderated chat rooms in addition to user-created private chat rooms. Common to webchat, its chat rooms required no software download to use. It allowed users to upload their own images into chat sessions and had three chat modes: streaming, frames, and no frames. In addition to images users could add audio, video, and hotlinks to conversations. WBS also featured other services, such as email, and allowed users to create and maintain personal web pages. Membership was free.

== History ==
=== Founding ===
WBS was founded as the Internet Roundtable Society in 1990 by Michael J. Fremont and Wendie Bernstein Lash in Menlo Park, California. It began as an "edutainment" company featuring such content as live Internet broadcasts of interviews with prominent individuals in science, technology and pop culture. As internet chatting gained popularity, the company began to focus on chat, whereupon the name was changed to the WebChat Broadcasting System in 1993.

=== Growth ===
IRC had existed as a dedicated chatting network but was mostly used by seasoned Internet users. Chat websites capitalized on the growing base of Internet general users by providing a simpler, more attractive chatting interface. Chatting became focused on community and socialization.

By August 1996, WBS had 500,000 registered users and was growing by over 3,000 users per day.

In February 1997, WBS reached a milestone of 1 million registered users, accruing 4,000 new registered users and 5.5 million page views every day. Registrations were not confirmed. At this point, it was featuring 200 individual affinity groups. Within a week of the launch of a new feature to allow members to create their own home pages, over 15,000 members had begun using it.

By May 1997, WBS had grown to 1.4 million registered users. The other large web chat community at this time was WebGenesis Inc.'s The Globe. Also internet service provider AOL had over 14,000 chat rooms available to their customers through their non-web interface.

In June 1997, WBS hit 1.5 million registered users and had 7 million daily page views with over 200 rooms.

WBS frequently hosted real-time multimedia programming events, which became more frequent as its popularity grew. Such events attracted many celebrities such as Tom Clancy, the celebrity cast of Star Trek, bands Soundgarden and Metallica, the former president of PBS and NBC News, Lawrence Grossman, United States Senator Arlen Specter, Intel CEO Andy Grove and feminist Gloria Steinem.

=== Rise of instant messaging ===
Web-based chatting in general began to lose popularity with the rise of several instant messaging desktop applications in the late 1990s. ICQ was first released in November 1996. AOL Instant Messenger was released in May 1997. Yahoo! Pager, later renamed Yahoo! Messenger, launched on 9 March 1998. AOL acquired ICQ's parent company Mirabilis on 8 June 1998. MSN Messenger from Microsoft, later renamed Windows Live Messenger, debuted on 22 July 1999.

=== Infoseek buyout and demise ===
Infoseek bought out WBS for approximately $6.7 million, or about 350,000 shares of Infoseek stock in April 1998. At the time WBS had 2.7 million users.

WBS daily page views were down to 5 million in April, 1998.

When Infoseek acquired WBS there had been several web portals that added chat as a service. Lycos had bought the Tripod community in February 1998 and Yahoo had added a deal with GeoCities in January 1998. There was strong competition between the web portals to match each other's services. WBS, at the time of the Infoseek acquisition, had 2.7 million registered users. This total was more than the membership of Tripod and GeoCities combined. WBS had only 350,000 personal homepages at the time. Infoseek's three main competitors at the time were Lycos, Yahoo, and Excite.

In 1998, Infoseek was purchased by the Go Network. On September 15, 1999, WBS was shut down and many of the more popular rooms were transferred to Go's Java-based chat system. All that was left for the members at that time was this simple message: "Go.Com has decided to close down WBS and move its most popular rooms to the chat rooms at Go.Com. Your home pages will still be viewable for an undetermined amount of time. Thank you for supporting WBS during its existence." By the Spring of 2000, all WBS home pages had been deleted. Go.com abandoned chat entirely in 2001.

== Migration ==
After its demise, many patrons of WBS migrated to other browser-based chat sites where some of the general topic rooms were recreated. Notable sites created in the wake of WBS' closure included bigbob.com, wbs-reloaded.com and mywbs.com, both of which were created by former WBS chatters, utilizing a similar browser-based chat system. It is likely that many WBS chatters began using instant messaging software, the popularity of which was increasing substantially at that time.

Martin Foster developed software that offered several of the features of the original WBS and IFC that had gained popularity. This code has been used in developing numerous chat sites which have attracted many former patrons of the original WBS, especially those who frequented the roleplaying rooms. It was originally developed to power Ethereal Realms, but the site now merely hosts the software for use on other sites.

== Audience ==
WBS offered a wide array of chat rooms categorized into hubs. Many rooms were dedicated to affinity groups based on age, race/ethnicity, religion, and sexuality. Others were specific to topics such as dating, entertainment, computers and the internet, travel, video games, roleplaying games, and the arts. The site would eventually host around 260 different chat rooms.

== Executives ==
President and CEO Bayard Winthrop was a frequent spokesperson for the company. After its buyout, he co-founded Freebord, a San Francisco-based sporting goods manufacturer, in January 2001. From 2008 to 2011, Winthrop was the CEO of Chrome Industries. He left in March 2011 and proceeded to found American Giant.

== 2009 revival ==
In July 2009, classic-wbs.net, a revival of WBS and virtually identical to the original community, was launched. Most of the original chat rooms and features had been retained or recreated. The most noticeable differences were the lack of personal homepages and the chat rooms were not moderated.

With no prior announcement, the revived WBS community was closed without explanation during the summer of 2023 and has not reappeared.

== See also ==
- Dot-com company
- Web chat
