= Nintendo gamebooks =

Novels based on Nintendo video games

Book #1: Double Trouble

Nintendo gamebooks are novels based on video games created by Nintendo. The gamebooks feature characters and settings from the Super Mario and The Legend of Zelda franchises, in two series, Nintendo Adventure Books and You Decide on the Adventure.

== Nintendo Adventure Books ==
The Nintendo Adventure Books series of 12 books was created by Russell Ginns, author of the Samantha Spinner series. It was published from 1991 to 1992 by Simon and Schuster in the United States and Archway Books and Mammoth Books in the United Kingdom. They are formatted like the popular Choose Your Own Adventure books, where the story progresses with the reader's decisions. Ten of the books are about the adventures of the Mario Bros. in the Mushroom Kingdom and are based primarily on the Valiant Comics published for the Nintendo Comics System imprint. Books nine and ten are about Link from The Legend of Zelda series.

Each book is 121 pages long, containing various puzzles such as mazes and word searches.

Some of the books were re-released as a promotion for Pringles.

1. Double Trouble (1991) by Russell Ginns
2. Leaping Lizards (1991) by Russell Ginns
3. Monster Mix-Up (1991) by Bill McCay
4. Koopa Capers (1991) by Bill McCay
5. Pipe Down! (1991) by Russell Ginns
6. Doors to Doom (1991) by Bill McCay
7. Dinosaur Dilemma (1991) by Russell Ginns
8. Flown the Koopa (1991) by Matt Wayne
9. The Crystal Trap (1992) by Matt Wayne
10. The Shadow Prince (1992) by Matt Wayne
11. Unjust Desserts (1992) by Matt Wayne
12. Brain Drain (1992) by Matt Wayne

== You Decide on the Adventure ==
The You Decide on the Adventure series has four gamebooks published by Scholastic from 2001 to 2002. All four were written by Craig Wessel, based on Game Boy Advance and Game Boy Color games.

1. Super Mario Advance (2001), based on Super Mario Advance
2. The Legend of Zelda: Oracle of Seasons (2001), based on The Legend of Zelda: Oracle of Seasons
3. The Legend of Zelda: Oracle of Ages (2002), based on The Legend of Zelda: Oracle of Ages
4. Wario Land 4 (2002), based on Wario Land 4

== See also ==
- Nintendo Comics System
- Worlds of Power
