= Lauren Simmons =

American producer, writer, podcaster, and former stock trader

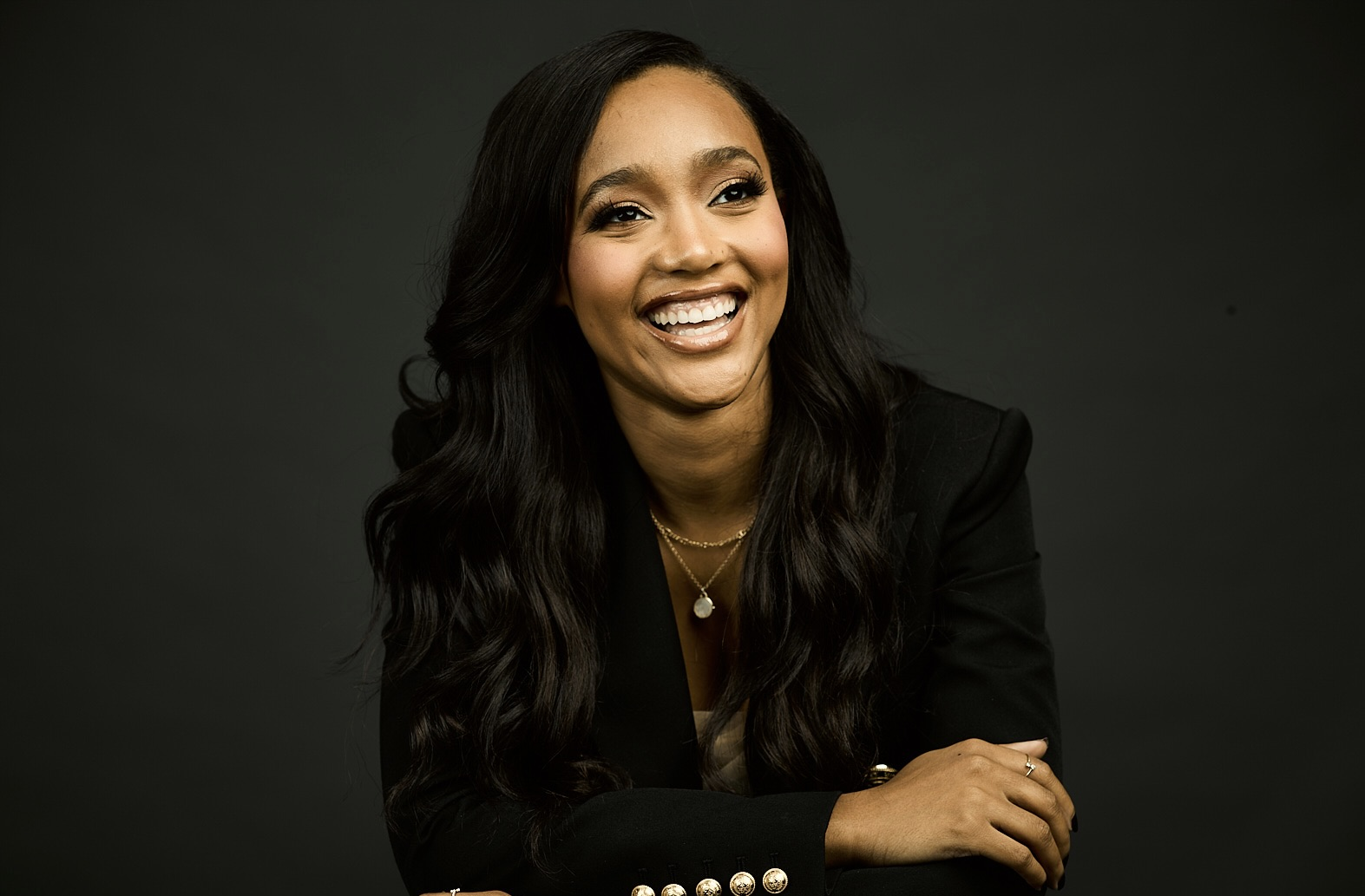
- Born: August 11, 1994 (age 32); Marietta, GA
- Education: Kennesaw State University
- Years active: 2018–present
- Known for: Youngest and only (current, but not first) full-time female trader at New York Stock Exchange

Lauren Simmons (born August 11, 1994) is an American producer, writer, podcaster, and former stock trader for Rosenblatt Securities. On March 6, 2017, at age 22, she became the youngest and only current full-time female trader at the New York Stock Exchange. She also became the second African American woman in the Exchange's 228-year history to have such a position. Simmons left Wall Street in December 2018.

She was named to Ebony's Power 100 list in 2018, and was also awarded 2018 Women of Impact by Politico.

She has been referred to as the "Wolfette of Wall Street".

== Early life ==
Simmons was raised in Marietta, Georgia. She received her bachelor's degree in genetics from Kennesaw State University in 2016 with plans to pursue a career in genetic counseling. However, she decided instead to move to New York City and once there she met Richard Rosenblatt through networking.

== Career ==
Simmons gained prominence in 2017 at age 22, after she took a job at Rosenblatt Securities and became the youngest and only woman trader on the New York Stock Exchange. She is also the second African American woman in history to have that position. During her time as a full-time equity trader she earned $12,000 per year. She left the position in December 2018, and cited exclusion by her coworkers after she received press coverage as one of her reasons for leaving. She is an advocate for the financial sector to take steps to increase diversity and inclusion.

In September, 2021, Simmons launched the podcast Mind, Body, Wealth, which she hosted through December, 2022. In February, 2022, Spotify launched a second show with Lauren Money Moves and became a Spotify original show. In 2021, she became the first host and producer of the web video series Going Public, which helps viewers invest in companies that are preparing to release an IPO. Simmons hosted the first season of the show, whose ten episodes aired from January 18, 2022 through March 23, 2022. In 2024, Baron Davis succeeded Simmons as host of the show, whose second season first aired on May 14, 2024. In 2024, Simmons hosted With The Bag To Match, a digital tv series produced by produced by SpringHill in partnership with J.P. Morgan Wealth Management.

Simmons wrote the 2023 book Make Money Move: A Guide to Financial Wellness about personal finance.

Simmons is the co-executive producer of a forthcoming biographical film about her life, starring and co-produced with Kiersey Clemons for AGC Studios.
