= D. Wayne Calloway =

American businessman (1935–1998)

- Born: September 12, 1935; Elkin, North Carolina
- Died: July 8, 1998 (aged 62); New York City
- Education: Wake Forest University
- Occupation: Executive
- Known for: CEO of PepsiCo (1986–1996)

Wayne Calloway (September 12, 1935 – July 8, 1998) was an American business executive. He was chairman and chief executive officer of PepsiCo from 1986 until the mid-1990s. He was chairman of the board of Wake Forest University, which named its undergraduate school of business in his honor in 1995. As of 2007, the Calloway Business School is ranked 17th in the nation for undergraduate business schools by U.S. News & World Report.

== Early life and education ==
Calloway was born on September 12, 1935, in Elkin, North Carolina, and spent his childhood in Winston-Salem, North Carolina. His mother, Lether Smith, worked in a Hanes hosiery mill.

He attended Wake Forest University on a basketball scholarship and earned a Bachelor's degree in accounting.

== Career ==
Prior to his role at PepsiCo, Calloway worked at Vick Chemical Company, then as a financial controller at ITT Corporation. In 1966, a headhunter called him and convinced him to take a job at PepsiCo; he served as a director of profit plan control at PepsiCo's Frito-Lay snack division starting in January 1967. He became president of the division in 1976 and held that position until 1983, when he was promoted to both executive vice president and chief financial officer. He then became CEO in 1986, taking over for Donald Kendall, who was retiring. Calloway stepped down from the role in 1996 due to health issues. In total, Calloway worked at PepsiCo for 31 years. His successor was Roger Enrico.

He oversaw a cultural change and significant expansion of the company during the Cola wars, a period of heightened competition between PepsiCo and Coca-Cola. In 1986, during Calloway's first year as CEO, PepsiCo bought KFC for $841 million and sold Wilson Sporting Goods and North American Van Lines. His approach attempted to engage employees at all levels, in part by compensating them with company stock and encouraging them to share their ideas for improving the company; in 1991, Calloway described the efforts by saying, "We have consciously and deliberately created a corporate culture that sanctions individual power."

He joined the board of General Electric in 1991, and was also a director of Citicorp and Exxon. He was a founding board member of the National Center for Policy Analysis.

He received the President's Volunteer Action Award for helping former Braniff International Airways workers find new jobs after Braniff declared bankruptcy in 1982.

== Personal life and death ==
Calloway had four children. He married Jan, a real estate agent, on January 1, 1980. They lived in Greenwich, Connecticut.

He enjoyed golf, tennis, skiing, and Harley-Davidson motorcycles.

He underwent surgery for prostate cancer in 1992, then retired in 1996 due to ongoing health issues. He died in Manhattan in on July 8, 1998, after a six-year battle with the cancer. He was 62 years old.

== See also ==
- Herman Lay
