= Disney Games Group =

Video game division of The Walt Disney Company

Coordinates: 34°09′52″N 118°22′30″W

- Trade name: Disney Games
- Formerly: Buena Vista Internet Group (1997―2007); Disney Interactive Media Group (2008―2012); Disney Interactive (2012―2018); Disney Electronic Content (2018―2026)
- Type: Division
- Industry: Video games
- Founded: 1995; 31 years ago
- Headquarters: 500 South Buena Vista Street, Burbank, California, U.S.
- Key people: Sean Shoptaw (EVP, Global Games and Digital Entertainment); Jay Ong (Head, Disney Games Group)
- Parent: Disney Entertainment
- Subsidiaries: Disney & Pixar Games; Marvel Games; Lucasfilm Games; 20th Century Games

Disney Games Group is a division of the Disney Entertainment business segment of The Walt Disney Company that oversees the company's global video game business through Disney & Pixar Games, Marvel Games, Lucasfilm Games, and 20th Century Games. Disney's video game operations are primarily conducted through licensing arrangements and development partnerships with third-party studios and publishers.

== History ==
=== 1995–1996: Formation and beginnings ===
Former logo, used since 1995

In December 1994, Disney announced that it was establishing a new division dedicated to publishing computer and video game console software, called Disney Interactive. The initial staff consisted of 200 newly hired employees. The company was formally established in mid-1995. On August 23, 1995, Disney Interactive formed Disney Online.

=== 1997–2007: Buena Vista Internet Group ===
Disney purchased a one-third share of Starwave on April 3, 1997, for $100 million. In January 1998, Disney registered go.com. Exercising its options, Disney purchased the outstanding shares of Starwave from Paul Allen in April 1998. In June 1998, Disney purchased 43% ownership of Infoseek in exchange for Starwave and $70 million. Infoseek and Disney Online joint ventured in developing the Go Network, an internet portal. With Disney's purchase of the remainder of Infoseek in July 1999, the Go Network, Infoseek, the Disney Catalog, Disney Online (Disney.com and DisneyStore.com), ABC News Internet Ventures and ESPN Internet Ventures and Buena Vista Internet Group are merged into the Go.com company.

In August 1996, BVIG took a controlling in interest in toysmart.com with three directors on the board. Toysmart would be granted marketing support including free advertising on BVIG websites like family.com. After an attempted round of financing, Toysmart.com shut down in May 2000.

In June 1999, the Disney Internet Guide was abandoned. The Go.com portal was shut down in 2001 at a cost of $878 million in charges.

In 2004, Disney re-activated the Starwave identity as Starwave Mobile, which publishes casual games for mobile phones for non-Disney brands with in Disney conglomerate or from third party.

In June 2005, Walt Disney Internet Group announced that they had acquired the British interactive TV game developer Minds Eye Productions. In November 2005, they acquired Living Mobile, a German mobile game developer and publisher.

It acquired Enorbus Technologies in 2007 for around $20 million.

=== 2008–2012: Disney Interactive Media Group ===
On June 5, 2008, Disney Interactive Studios and the Walt Disney Internet Group merged into a single business unit, now known as the Disney Interactive Media Group (DIMG). In 2009, DIMG's Disney Online unit purchased multiple websites from Kaboose.

In July 2010, Disney Interactive purchased Playdom for $563.2 million and Tapulous for its mobile division. In October 2010, two co-presidents were named for DIMG, John Pleasants and James Pitaro, with orders to make the company profitable.

In January 2011, DIMG closed Propaganda Games and laid off 200 employees later in the month. The dual presidents placed the game studios of Blackrock, Junction Point, Avalanche, Wideload and Gamestar under game development chief Alex Seropian while Club Penguin co-creator Lane Merrifield was assigned to games for kids and families within a new publishing unit to handle marketing and production. On February 18, DIMG purchased Togetherville, a pre-teen social network. Also in February, DIMG purchased Finland-based Rocket Pack, a game development company with a plugin free game development system. In November, DIMG purchased Babble Media Inc.

In October 2011, it acquired Indiagames for between $80 million and $100 million.

In April 2012, DIMG announced three web series targeted towards mothers: "Moms of", "That's Fresh", and "Thinking Up." By October, DIMG had 15 consecutive quarters of losses totaling some $977 million. Following conflicts with Pleasants, Merrifield resigned from the company. DIMG also in October announced "Toy Box", a cross platform gaming initiative where Pixar and Disney characters will interact from a console game to multiple mobile and online applications.

=== 2012–2018: Disney Interactive ===
In 2012, Disney Interactive Media Group shortened its name to Disney Interactive (DI).

In January 2013, Disney Interactive's Avalanche Software unveiled the Toy Box cross platform game as Disney Infinity, based on Toy Story 3: The Video Game's "Toy Box" mode crossed with a toy line. Also in January, Disney Interactive announced the closure of Junction Point Studios.

In October 2013, Disney announced that its Interactive division had a profit of $16 million for its fourth quarter, based partly on sales of Disney Infinity and uniting both halves of the division under one president.

In March 2014, Disney Interactive announced it was laying off 700 people in order to combine its two-game units, mobile and social, due to sagging popularity of Facebook games, and closing some Disney Online sites. The company stated that it would place less emphasis on advertising and instead focus on sponsorships for Disney Online and licensed game development. Certain segments of the business, such as a mobile application in Japan and the Disney Infinity franchise, remained profitable.

Disney Interactive was merged with Disney Consumer Products on June 29, 2015, forming a new segment and division known as "Disney Consumer Products and Interactive Media", with Disney Interactive as a direct unit. In December 2015, Maker Studios was placed under the control of Disney Interactive with the appointment of Maker's executive vice president Courtney Holt, reporting to Jimmy Pitaro, president of Disney Interactive.

With a lack of growth in toy-to-game market and increasing developmental costs, in May 2016, Disney Interactive discontinued Disney Infinity and closed down Avalanche Software. The company additionally ceased all self-publishing efforts. The company reported a $147 million earnings impact for ending its console gaming business.

In September 2018, Disney confirmed the imminent discontinuation of Club Penguin Island in a letter sent to its Disney Online Studios team in Kelowna, as well as the layoffs of most employees in said studio.

In November 2018, Disney reached an agreement with Jam City to assume operation of its Glendale-based Disney Interactive Studios. As part of the deal, Jam City acquired Emoji Blitz and development rights for future games based on Pixar and Walt Disney Animation Studios franchises. Employees at the studio were offered positions with Jam City to continue working on the Disney titles.

=== 2018–2026: Disney Electronic Content ===
Disney Electronic Content would take over publishing duties of various Disney-branded video games not licensed to other companies. Disney later revived its gaming division in 2023 as Disney Games, which later became Disney & Pixar Games in 2026 to focus on both Disney and Pixar properties. Their first release was Disney Classic Games: Aladdin and The Lion King on October 29, 2019 for Microsoft Windows, Nintendo Switch, PlayStation 4 and Xbox One, a collection of tie-in video games based on both films developed by Digital Eclipse. A re-release featuring The Jungle Book games and the SNES version of Aladdin, titled Disney Classic Games Collection was released on November 23, 2021.

Disney Electronic Content released Zombies Ate My Neighbors and Ghoul Patrol on June 29, 2021. Disney Illusion Island, a platform game developed by Dlala Studios, was released for Nintendo Switch on July 28, 2023 and for Windows, PlayStation 5, and Xbox Series X/S on May 30, 2025.

=== 2026–present: Disney Games Group ===
In March 2026, Disney Interactive was transferred from Disney Experiences to Disney Entertainment. On August 13, 2026, Disney announced that the division's gaming operations for Disney and Pixar, Marvel, Lucasfilm, and 20th Century Studios would be consolidated under the newly formed Disney Games Group.

== Former operations ==
The predecessor organizations of Disney Games Group, including Disney Interactive Media Group and Disney Interactive, previously operated video game development studios, mobile gaming businesses, online services and digital media properties.

=== Video game and mobile operations ===
- Rocket Pack
- StudioEX
- Gamestar
- Disney Online Studios
- Disney Mobile

=== Online and digital media operations ===
The predecessor organizations also oversaw online and digital media businesses, including Disney Online and Disney Digital Network (formerly Maker Studios), which focused on digital video content.

==== Disney Online ====
Disney Online was established on August 23, 1995, as a division of Disney Interactive, with Jake Winebaum appointed as its president. It operated Disney-branded websites, online entertainment services and family-oriented digital content. Its early operations included DisneyStore.com, launched in November 1996, and Family.com, launched the following month.

In April 1997, Disney announced plans to acquire Starwave's Family Planet website and merge it with Family.com. The division also launched Disney's Daily Blast, a subscription-based online service for children distributed through the Microsoft Network. In 1998, Disney Online launched the Disney Internet Guide (dig.com), a child-friendly web directory that closed in June 1999 as Disney shifted its focus toward Infoseek and the Go Network.

During the late 2000s, Disney expanded its family-oriented digital portfolio through acquisitions, including iParenting Media in 2007, Take180 in 2008, and several websites from Kaboose in 2009, including BabyZone.com, AmazingMoms.com and Funschool.com. Disney also acquired the children's creative website Kerpoof in February 2009. In November 2011, Disney Interactive Media Group acquired Babble Media, expanding its portfolio of parenting websites and blogs.

In March 2014, Disney Interactive announced a restructuring involving approximately 700 layoffs and the closure of smaller Disney Online websites, including BabyZone.com and Spoonful.com. The company also shifted its online advertising strategy toward sponsorships and branded content.

Disney Online's portfolio included Disney.com, the Disney Family Network, Babble.com and DigiSynd, a social media marketing business.
