= American Giant =

American sportswear and casual clothing company

- Type: Private
- Founded: February 2012; 14 years ago
- Founder: Bayard Winthrop
- Headquarters: San Francisco
- Products: men's sweatshirts; t-shirts; sweatpants; women's sportswear & jeans
- Website: www.american-giant.com

American Giant is an American San Francisco–based manufacturer of sportswear and casual clothing that sells directly to customers through its website. Its goods are all produced in the United States of America.

== History ==
American Giant was founded in February 2012 by Bayard Winthrop, former head of Chrome Industries, to address what he saw as a lack of affordably priced, high-quality, American-made products. He believed that by selling direct to the customer, a business could save enough on distribution and marketing to sell products manufactured in America at mainstream prices.

American Giant was named one of the 50 Most Innovative Companies by Fast Company in 2015 and cited for "breathing new life into U.S. apparel manufacturing".

The company's products were initially made at a factory in Brisbane, California. The company decided to base much of its supply chain in North Carolina, in part because it is a right-to-work state with lower labor costs.

The company launched with one product, a hooded sweatshirt. After a viral video and favorable publicity (a review in Slate called it "the greatest hoodie ever made"), demand outstripped the factory's capacity, and unable to find other sites that satisfied his standards, Winthrop chose to let orders back up rather than compromise on quality. As of January 2019, the company was manufacturing its clothing in Los Angeles and Middlesex, North Carolina.

American Giant's main initial investor was former PepsiCo CEO and chairman Donald M. Kendall. Later investors included Emil Capital Partners, a venture capital firm. As of January 2019, the company had raised $5.6 million and had begun a round of financing with a target of $12 million.

With Randy Komisar, Winthrop published I F*cking Love That Company (2014), a book about direct to consumer retail.

WeWork cofounder Miguel McKelvey bought a controlling stake in the company for $10 million in 2022.

== Products ==
American Giant launched with its Classic Full Zip hooded sweatshirt, which was created by Philipe Manoux, a former industrial engineer at Apple. Using cotton grown in North Carolina, it is constructed of heavyweight fleece and features reinforced elbow pads, a double-lined hood, and custom hardware.

The product line has since expanded to include other kinds of men's sweatshirts, tee-shirts, and sweatpants, and subsequently women's sportswear and jeans. In 2018, the company began selling yarn-dyed flannel shirts.
