= Donald M. Kendall =

American businessman (1921–2020)

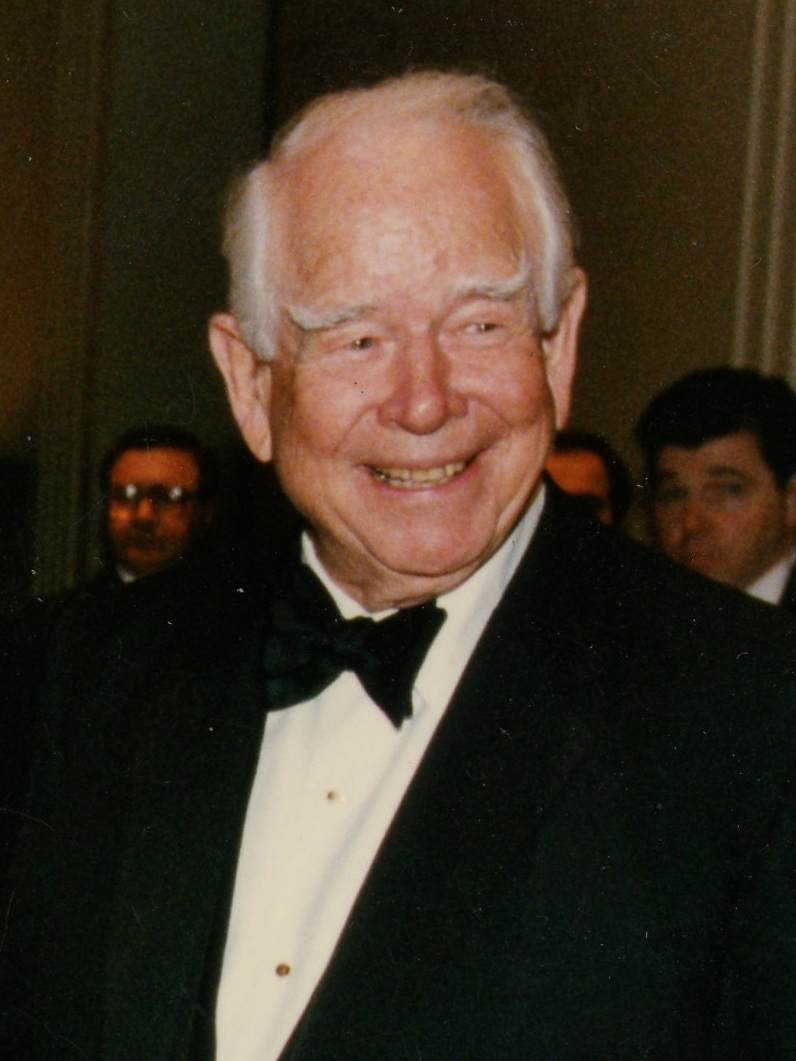
- Kendall in c. 1998
- Born: Donald Mcintosh Kendall; March 16, 1921; Sequim, Washington, U.S.
- Died: September 19, 2020 (aged 99); Greenwich, Connecticut, U.S.
- Occupations: Businessman, political adviser

Donald Mcintosh Kendall (March 16, 1921 – September 19, 2020) was an American businessman and political adviser. He was CEO of Pepsi Cola (which merged with Herman Lay's Frito Lay, Inc. to become PepsiCo in 1965), and CEO of PepsiCo from 1971 to 1986. Kendall died on September 19th, 2020 at 99 years old.

== Early life ==
Donald Kendall was born in Clallam County, Washington, where his family owned a dairy farm, in 1921.

== Military service ==
In 1942 Kendall joined the U.S. Navy. As a Navy Catalina PBY seaplane pilot he assisted in the Landings at Manila Bay, Mindoro, and Leyte Gulf. He was awarded 3 Air Medals and a Distinguished Flying Cross.

== Education ==
Kendall attended Western Kentucky State College. He was the recipient of an Honorary Doctorate of Law Degree from Stetson University, DeLand, Florida; an Honorary Doctorate of Law Degree from Babson College, Wellesley, Massachusetts; and a Doctor of Law from Gonzaga University in Spokane, Washington. Kendall also received Doctor of Humane Letters degrees from Mercy College, Dobbs Ferry, New York; Manhattanville College, Purchase, New York; the State University of New York (SUNY) Purchase; and Long Island University, Brookville, New York.

== Pepsi Cola, Inc. ==
Kendall joined the Pepsi Cola Company in 1947, working at a bottling plant in New Rochelle, New York. After a later stint as a delivery driver, Kendall became a sales representative and rose through the sales ranks, becoming a marketing vice president in 1956. He headed up Pepsi's international operation in 1957 and became the CEO in 1963, taking over for former lawyer Herbert Barnet. In 1963, he made the decision to change the name of Pepsi's diet soda from Patio Diet Cola to Diet Pepsi. In the early years of diet soft drinks, Pepsi became the first major soda manufacturer to give its diet product the same name as its flagship product.

Kendall brought Pepsi to Russia and was awarded the Order of Friendship by Vladimir Putin, President of Russia, in 2004. He oversaw the creation of the Donald M. Kendall Sculpture Gardens, a sculpture park that includes gardens, trails, parks, and a collection of art, primarily 20th century sculpture including works by Auguste Rodin, David Wynne, Alberto Giacometti, and Alexander Calder, at PepsiCo's corporate headquarters in Purchase, New York.

He retired in 1986, succeeded by D. Wayne Calloway.

== Board memberships ==
Kendall sat on numerous corporate boards including the Director of Enfrastructure, Inc., Buy.com, AmRest Holdings SE, National Alliance of Businessmen, and Grocery Manufacturers of America, Inc. He was also the main investor of American Giant, a clothing manufacturing company.

== Chile ==
In 1970, Kendall requested and participated in a high-level meeting of Chilean businessman and publisher Agustín Edwards Eastman of the Edwards family with high Nixon administration officials, after which President Nixon met with then-National Security Adviser Henry Kissinger and CIA Director Richard Helms and, in the words of a 1976 New York Times article, said "that Chile was to be saved from Salvador Allende and he didn't care much how."

According to The Guardian:

...the October 1970 plot against Chile's President-elect Salvador Allende ... was the direct result of a plea for action a month earlier by Donald Kendall, chairman of PepsiCo, in two telephone calls to the company's former lawyer, President Richard Nixon. Kendall arranged for the owner of the company's Chilean bottling operation to meet National Security Adviser Henry Kissinger on September 15. Hours later, Nixon called in his CIA chief, Richard Helms, and, according to Helms's handwritten notes, ordered the CIA to prevent Allende's inauguration.

== Joan Crawford ==
Kendall had a stormy professional relationship with actress Joan Crawford, who referred to Kendall as "Fang" until her death in 1977. Crawford gained a seat on the board of directors of Pepsi Cola Company after the death of her husband Alfred Steele, who was the chairman of the board of Pepsi, in 1959. She was active in promoting Pepsi-Cola, traveling both nationally and internationally for events such as plant openings and new product promotions. In 1973, when Crawford officially turned 65 (she was actually two years older, born in 1906), she was forcibly retired from her position on the company's board of directors.

== Richard Nixon ==
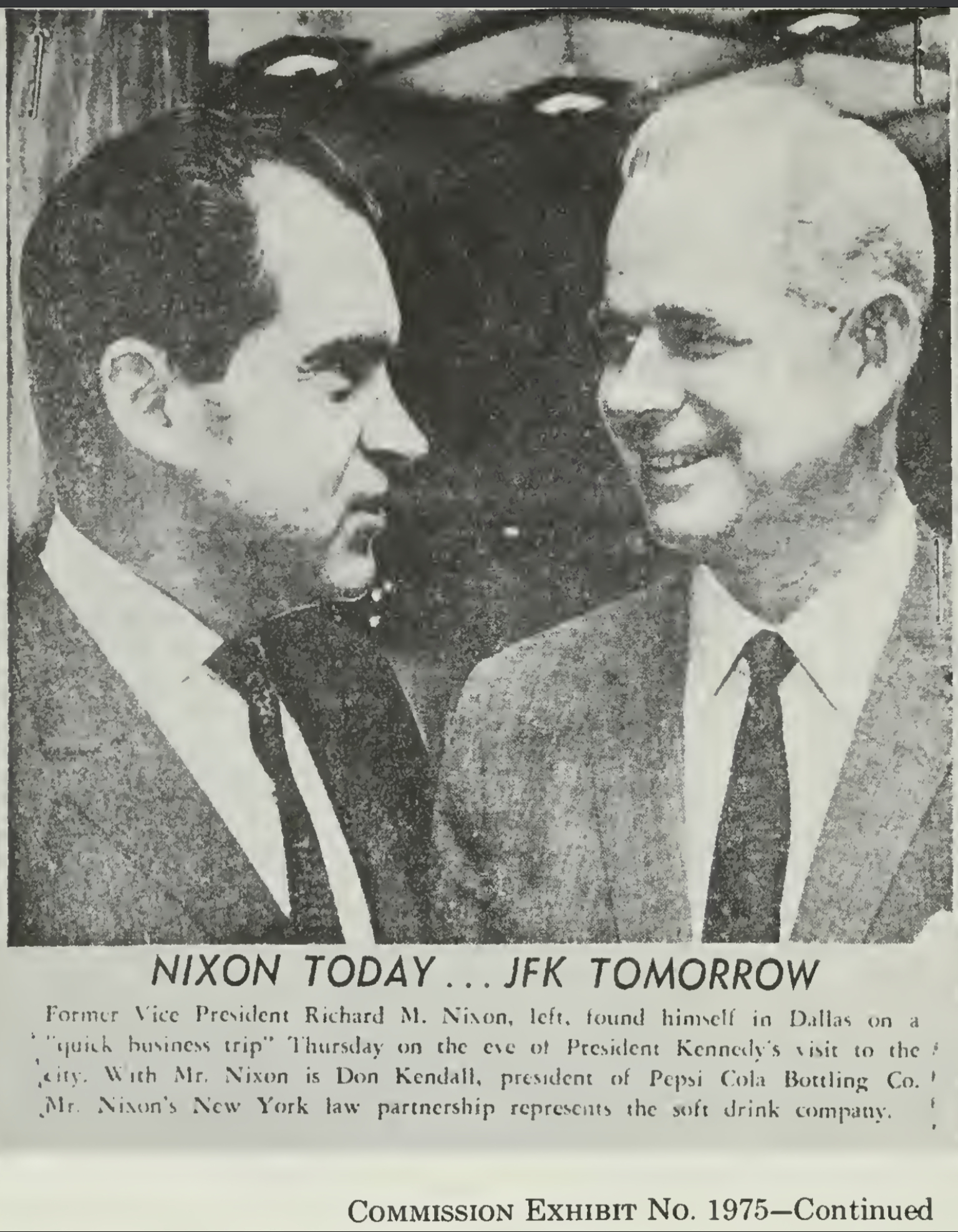
Kendall and Richard Nixon, 21 November 1963

Kendall was well acquainted with Richard Nixon and was photographed with him during Nixon’s 1959 visit to Moscow, where the Kitchen Debate occurred. During the same trip, Kendall was also photographed with Nikita Khrushchev. During the Nixon administration Pepsi Cola was always a prominent beverage at White House functions. A conversation between Kendall and Nixon in the Oval Office appears in the second volume of the Watergate tapes. Kendall is heard offering advice to Nixon on how to handle his difficult situation. He later told an interviewer that he was "disappointed" at the way Nixon handled Watergate: "How could you help but be?"

== Death ==
Kendall died on September 19, 2020, at his home in Greenwich, Connecticut, at the age of 99 years.

== Recognition ==
- 1989, George F. Kennan Award for outstanding contribution to improving U.S. Soviet relations
- 1987, National Business Hall of Fame
- 1986, the inaugural recipient of the NAACP Legal Defense and Educational Fund’s Equal Justice Award
- 1979, Golden Plate Award of the American Academy of Achievement presented by Awards Council member Olivia de Havilland
