= Zombies Ate My Neighbors =

1993 video game

- North American Genesis box art
- Developer: LucasArts (Note: Lucasfilm Classic Games version developed by DotEmu)
- Publisher: Konami
- Designer: Mike Ebert
- Programmer: Dean Sharpe
- Artists: Collette Michaud; Leonard Robel; Sean Turner
- Composers: Joe McDermott; George Sanger
- Platforms: Super NES, Genesis/Mega Drive, Nintendo Switch, PlayStation 4, Windows, Xbox One
- Release: Super NES: NA: September 1993; EU: 1993; Genesis/Mega Drive: NA: November 1993; EU: January 21, 1994; Nintendo Switch, PlayStation 4, Windows, Xbox One: WW: June 29, 2021
- Genre: Run and gun
- Modes: Single-player, multiplayer

Zombies Ate My Neighbors is a 1993 run and gun video game developed by LucasArts and published by Konami for the Super Nintendo Entertainment System and Sega Genesis. The player controls the protagonists Zeke and Julie in order to rescue the titular neighbors from monsters often seen in horror films. Aiding them in this task are a variety of weapons and power-ups that can be used to battle the numerous enemies in each level. Various elements and aspects of horror movies are referenced in the game with some of its more violent content being censored in various territories such as Europe and Australia, where it is known only as Zombies.

While not a great commercial success, the game was well-received for its graphical style, humor and deep gameplay. It spawned a sequel, Ghoul Patrol, released in 1994. Both games were re-released as part of Lucasfilm Classic Games: Zombies Ate My Neighbors and Ghoul Patrol for the Nintendo Switch, PlayStation 4, Windows, and Xbox One by Disney Interactive in June 2021.

== Gameplay ==
Zeke at the end of a level

The mad scientist Dr. Tongue has created a wide variety of monsters within the bowels of his castle and has unleashed them on nearby suburban areas, terrorizing its inhabitants. Two teenage friends, Zeke and Julie, having witnessed the attack of said monsters, arm themselves with a great deal of unconventional weaponry and items to combat them and save their neighbors from certain death. Ultimately, they will come face to face with Dr. Tongue himself and defeat him to put an end to his plans.

The player can choose between Zeke and Julie, or play both in a two-player mode. They navigate suburban neighborhoods, shopping malls, pyramids, haunted castles, and other areas, destroying a variety of horror-movie monsters, including vampires, werewolves, huge demonic babies, spiders, squidmen, evil dolls, aliens, UFOs, giant ants, blobs, giant worms, mummies, chainsaw-wielding maniacs, "pod people" (aggressive alien clones of the players), and the game's namesake, zombies. In each of the 48 stages, which includes seven optional bonus levels, the players must rescue numerous types of neighbors, including barbecue chefs, teachers, babies, tourists, archeologists, soldiers, dogs, and cheerleaders. Once all neighbors on a level have been killed by zombies or saved by the players touching them, a door opens that will take the player to the next stage.

All types of neighbors will be killed if an enemy touches them, preventing them from being saved for the remainder of the game or until an "Extra Bonus Victim" is awarded. On some levels, daytime gradually turns to night. Upon nightfall, tourists transform into werewolves and cannot be saved; the game counts it as if they had been killed. At least one neighbor must be saved from each level to progress to the next. The game is lost if the players lose all of their lives or if all of the neighbors are killed. Scoring points earns players neighbors to save and extra lives. Each level has at most ten neighbors, and each neighbor type is worth a different number of points.

There are various items that the players can pick up along the way. These include keys that open up doors, health packs that restore health, and potions with various effects such as increasing speed or temporarily transforming the player into a powerful monster. Players can also collect various types of weapons, such as an Uzi water gun, bazookas, weed-whackers, explosive soda cans, ice pops, tomatoes, silverware, dishes, ancient crucifixes, flamethrowers, fire extinguishers, and Martian bubble guns, each with their own effectiveness against certain types of enemies.

== Development ==
Zombies Ate My Neighbors was originally developed by LucasArts. It was published by Konami, a company already known for platformers, in 1993. Music for the game was composed by Joseph "Joe" McDermott. The game was developed on the Super NES, before it was ported to the Sega Genesis about halfway through. The ZAMN engine would later be used for Ghoul Patrol, Metal Warriors, and Big Sky Trooper. The developer wanted to include a battery save in the game but was unable to as they could not afford it.

The monsters in the game are based on classic horror films released in the 1950s and more modern films like Friday the 13th and The Texas Chain Saw Massacre. Weapon effectiveness is also based on these depictions; werewolves die in one hit if attacked with silverware and vampires die faster if attacked with the crucifix. In the SNES version of the game, there's a flamethrower which is not included in the Mega Drive version. The North American SNES game was later released with a variant cover art in limited quantities.

== Release ==
The game was subject to some censorship. This game was released before the ESRB existed and, before then, Nintendo did not want violence in their video games. Nintendo of America ordered all depictions of blood and gore to be removed or changed to purple ooze. Censorship committees in several European Nations – the United Kingdom, Ireland, Italy, France, Spain, Austria, Portugal, Finland, Denmark, Norway, Sweden, and Germany – censored it further by having the game renamed to Zombies, and ordered other changes including the replacement of the chainsaw-wielding enemies with lumberjacks wielding axes.

In October 2009, the Super NES version of Zombies Ate My Neighbors was re-released for the Wii Virtual Console.

In May 2021, the game and its sequel were announced for the Nintendo Switch, PlayStation 4, Xbox One and Windows, with a port developed by Dotemu and co-published by Disney Interactive and Lucasfilm Games. Lucasfilm Classic Games: Zombies Ate My Neighbors and Ghoul Patrol was released on June 29, 2021.

== Reception ==
Reception

Aggregate score
Aggregator	Score
GameRankings	84.5%

Review scores
Publication	Score
AllGame	SMD: 4/5
Electronic Gaming Monthly	SMD: 42/50
GamePro	SNES: 18.5/20
IGN	8/10
Nintendo Life	8/10
Nintendo Power	3.8/5
VideoGames & Computer Entertainment	SNES: 9/10
Sega-16	8/10
Power Unlimited	SNES: 91% SMD: 90%

Although not an immediate commercial success, Zombies Ate My Neighbors received generally positive reviews, earning an 84.5% on GameRankings. Reviewers of the game often cited its humor, two-player mode, graphics and music as some of its best aspects. It would become a cult classic years after its release.

Mike Seiblier of Sega-16 said the variety of weapons shows off the game's "tongue in cheek nature by giving you weapons and items like silverware, dishes, soda can grenades, a weed whacker, keys, bazookas as well as health packs". Critics agreed the co-op mode is "highly recommended". The enemies also bore similarities to characters from numerous horror films. For instance, the level titled "Terror in Aisle Five" introduces the enemy named "Chuckles". This character serves as a reference to the primary antagonist of the film Child's Play, which features a small doll with violent intent.

The game's "colorful and detailed" graphics have been praised as well as its soundtrack, which Seibler called an "homage to the spooky, over the top music found in old, scary flicks". He went on to mention the sound effects are equally impressive. Corbie Dillard of Nintendo Life said the graphics do not "exactly set new 16-bit standards, but they still manage to look sharp and the creative use of the darker color scheme used throughout the game really makes the creepy visuals come to life onscreen". He ended his review by affectionately calling the game a "second-rate horror movie" version of Contra. Power Unlimited praised the game calling it a "Fantastically wacky game", praised the two-player mode and found the SNES version has better graphics than the Mega Drive counterpart. They also reviewed the Mega Drive version and found the game to be almost as good as the SNES version, except for the controls being more difficult and graphics not as good.

Upon the game's release for the Wii Virtual Console, Zombies Ate My Neighbors received immense praise and earned an Editor's Choice Award from IGN. The game has been regarded as one of "the most requested additions to the VC system even before the Wii launch".

=== Accolades ===
Mega ranked the game 42nd in their "Top 50 Mega Drive Games" in 1994. IGN ranks it the 48th best Super Nintendo game. They called the game "Incredibly fun and funny." In 2018, Complex listed the game 48th on its "The Best Super Nintendo Games of All Time" list. They felt the game was amazing and the only criticism they had was the levels got a little repetitive. In 2017, GamesRadar rated the game 21st on their "Best Sega Genesis/Mega Drive Games of All Time" In 1995, Total! ranked the game 43rd in their Top 100 SNES Games. In 1996, GamesMaster listed the Mega Drive version ninth in their "The GamesMaster Mega Drive Top 10."

== Legacy ==
In 1997, LucasArts released a game for the PlayStation and the Sega Saturn titled Herc's Adventures, which uses the same basic gameplay format and mechanics as Zombies Ate My Neighbors. Programmer Chris Long cited Zombies Ate My Neighbors as a major influence on his 1997 game Swagman.

Day of the Tentacle, another game developed by LucasArts, is referenced in Zombies Ate My Neighbors through a secret level. Comparisons to the game Dead Rising, released for the Xbox 360 in 2006, have been drawn, Lucas Thomas of IGN saying: "Zombies Ate My Neighbors is basically a comical 16-bit template for the new Xbox 360 release, Dead Rising. And like that game, this one arm you with a pretty bizarre arsenal. Weed whackers, exploding soda cans, and flying silverware all make an appearance to help you, or you and a friend, put a hurt on these living dead."

=== Sequels and spin-offs ===
A sequel entitled Ghoul Patrol was released in 1994, which was also well-received. Originally, Ghoul Patrol was not intended to be released as a sequel to Zombies Ate My Neighbors, but was re-worked as such to increase sales.

As of 2011, a film based on the game was in development. The film was being penned and produced by screenwriter and director John Darko, known for his work on James Wan's Insidious and Aaron Sims' Archetype. At the time of the report, the film was in the process of securing rights from LucasArts and obtaining a director, as well as financing.

An unofficial, spiritual sequel, Demons Ate My Neighbors, has been in development by Tuned-Out Games since 2020.
