= Castle Infinity =

1996 video game

- A screenshot of the Central Fountain
- Developer: Starwave
- Publisher: Starwave Corporation
- Designers: Russell Ginns; Gregg Foster; Scott Wallin
- Release: 1996
- Genre: MMOG

Castle Infinity is a discontinued Massively multiplayer online game, the first intended for children. It was launched by Starwave Corporation in 1996, and features personalized avatars, an embedded message system and live chat in a 2D side scrolling game world. It survives as a freeware MMOG.

The game is full of interactions that force players to collaborate with each other in order to pass from one area to the next, by way of four-person vehicles and other game-like lobbying devices.

The a cappella group The Bobs provided several original songs for the soundtrack. Additionally, members of the band also lent their voices for most of the characters.

== History ==
Castle Infinity was first released in 1996, making it the first fully released MMOG designed for children. It was originally designed by Russell Ginns, Gregg Foster, and Scott Wallin, with art direction and animation by Jonathan Maier and Andy Norman. It was developed and published by Paul Allen's early internet company Starwave.

The initial launch included a joint promotion with Netcom, retail displays in Blockbuster Video, and coupons included in the packaging toward the purchase of a USRobotics modem.

Access to the game required a CD-Rom and also a subscription. This technology requirement, plus the nascent child online audience at the time, proved too limiting for wide distribution. At its peak, the service had approximately 4,000 registered players. Ownership passed to Disney when Starwave was acquired in 1997. Disney did not maintain development for the game, and access to the service became intermittent starting in 1998, and was shut down entirely by 2000.

=== Revival ===
In 2000, the game servers were rescued from a dumpster by Kevin Quitt, a programmer who happened to be one of the game's players, and new development of the game began run by Castle Infinity, Inc. a non-profit organization. In 2005 there was fresh media coverage of the game by way of Slashdot and BoingBoing.

In 2011 a new server was launched with the help of former players, including Spencer Jerome, Donald Butyen and Rachel Coleman. At present, Castle Infinity, LLC, manages the effort.

In 2026, the game was re-released and the original URL has been restored.

== Story ==
Castle Infinity takes place in a virtual world created by dinosaurs 65,000,000 years ago to escape from a comet approaching the earth. The virtual world has become infested with monsters but mammals have evolved to the point that they have invented the internet and can now access the Castle. Players are welcomed in by dinosaurs, who want mammals (kids) to help them save the Castle from the monsters.

== Gameplay ==
Castle Infinity is a 2D side-scrolling world, where players collect "grow caps" and "hats" to unlock new play areas. The game places a heavy emphasis on player interaction, and much of the game's map is constructed to encourage users to collaborate in order to proceed. Players complete challenges which require multiple players to participate together, such as piloting a submarine that requires four pilots to steer properly. There are many locations where, in order to access higher levels, at least 3 or 4 members are required to stand on the same spot for the lift to activate.

Much of the directing of players between single and multi-player environments was a solution to the challenges of latency. The game was launched when a majority of home users had 9600 or 14.4k Modems. By siphoning players into individual areas, they could experience side-scrolling action. Then, in 4-player or unlimited areas, the focus was on communication and exchanging items.

The game's "official language" is Esperanto. Many signs and audio clips feature warnings and comments in a pidgin version of that language.
