= Hooked on Phonics =

Brand of educational materials

- Predecessor: Gateway Educational Products
- Founded: December 1, 1987; 38 years ago
- Country of origin: United States
- Headquarters location: Danbury, Connecticut
- Distribution: Simon & Schuster
- Publication types: Books, software, educational materials
- Nonfiction topics: Educational
- Owners: Hooked & Company (Sandviks Inc.)
- Official website: www.hookedonphonics.com

Hooked on Phonics is a commercial brand of educational materials, initially designed to teach reading through phonics. First marketed on December 1, 1987, the program uses systematic phonics and scaffolded stories to teach letter–sound correlations as part of children's literacy. Over time, the brand has expanded to include a wide variety of media, such as books, computer games, music, videos, and flashcards. The current primary target audience includes individuals, some schools, and homeschooling parents. The product gained significant recognition during the 1990s due to extensive television and radio advertising.

== History ==
Hooked on Phonics was developed in the 1980s, with the original Learn to Read product released by Gateway Educational Products & HMS Group on December 1, 1987. The company's success was largely driven by significant advertising, leading to sales exceeding $100 million annually. The product's catchphrase, "Hooked on Phonics worked for me!", and the memorable telephone number "1-800-ABCDEFG" became widely recognized during the mid-1990s.

In 1994, the company was featured on Dateline NBC, with an official from the Federal Trade Commission (FTC) accusing it of "deceptive advertising." Gateway Educational Products and the FTC reached a settlement, with the company agreeing to adhere to advertising guidelines and disclose all research data and consumer complaints. Despite the settlement, negative media coverage led to a significant decline in sales, resulting in the company's bankruptcy. In 1996, Gateway Educational Products, Ltd. was renamed as Gateway Worldwide; in 1998, Gateway Worldwide was renamed as Gateway Learning Corporation, and the flagship Learn to Read product was extensively redesigned, including new games called Word Play and Pile Up; HOP Books, HOP Companion Books, and HOP Chapter Books; My Reading Adventure posters, and stories from workbooks 1–5, Word Play cards, Helper Word Cards, Helper Word Letters from workbooks 1–4, and stories from Helper Words that children would learn from workbooks 1–4. Cassettes were extensively re-recorded; workbooks and flash cards were extensively redesigned for parents and children. Later in 2005, the company incorporated CDs that were digital recordings of the same Learn to Read product. In 2001, the company introduced the "Hooked on School Success" program, which included test-taking strategies and study skills. That same year, a partnership with KinderCare Learning Centers was established to use Hooked on Phonics materials in KinderCare's private childcare facilities, and Helper Word Deluxe Cards designed for Level 5.

In 2004, the FTC fined Gateway Learning Corporation, for retroactively changing its privacy policy without informing customers and for sharing private information, including data on children, with external marketing firms.

In 2005, Educate, Inc., which also operated Sylvan Learning, acquired Hooked on Phonics and began selling the products at retail businesses. In 2006, the company released new educational programs, including Hooked on Spanish, Hooked on Handwriting, and Hooked on Spelling. By 2007, the Hooked on Phonics program had been introduced in over 30 countries. Later that year, the company was taken private and renamed Smarterville, Inc.

In 2009, the flagship Learn to Read product was extensively redesigned, incorporating DVDs, web customizations, and a new series of systematic phonics readers. This release also included 60 music videos composed by Russell Ginns and performed by artists such as Cathy Fink, Marcy Marxer, and the acappella group The Bobs. Sandviks Inc. acquired Hooked on Phonics in 2011, bringing new management and a fresh start to the company.

In 2013, the Hooked on Phonics mobile app was launched for iOS and Android devices. This app was completely overhauled and relaunched in 2020. In 2022, the Hooked on Math app was introduced, and the brand expanded under the umbrella name Hooked & Company.

== Authors ==
The Hooked on Phonics program features books and stories by more than fifty authors, including Charlotte Zolotow, Robert D. San Souci, Russell Ginns, David Ezra Stein, Rosemary Wells, and Jahnna N. Malcolm.

== Performers ==
The program's musical content includes contributions from the following artists:

- The Bobs
- Cathy Fink & Marcy Marxer
- Marcy Heisler
- Russell Ginns
- Bob Dorough
- Stuart Kollmorgan
- Ben Steinfeld
- Carolee Goodgold
- Eric Stuart
- April and Eva Ginns
- Randy Thomas

== Awards ==
Hooked on Phonics products have received several awards over the years, including:

- National Parenting Seal of Approval (1998, 2005, 2007)
- Teachers' Choice Award (2004, 2008, 2009)

== See also ==
- List of phonics programs
