= Russell Ginns =

American author and game designer

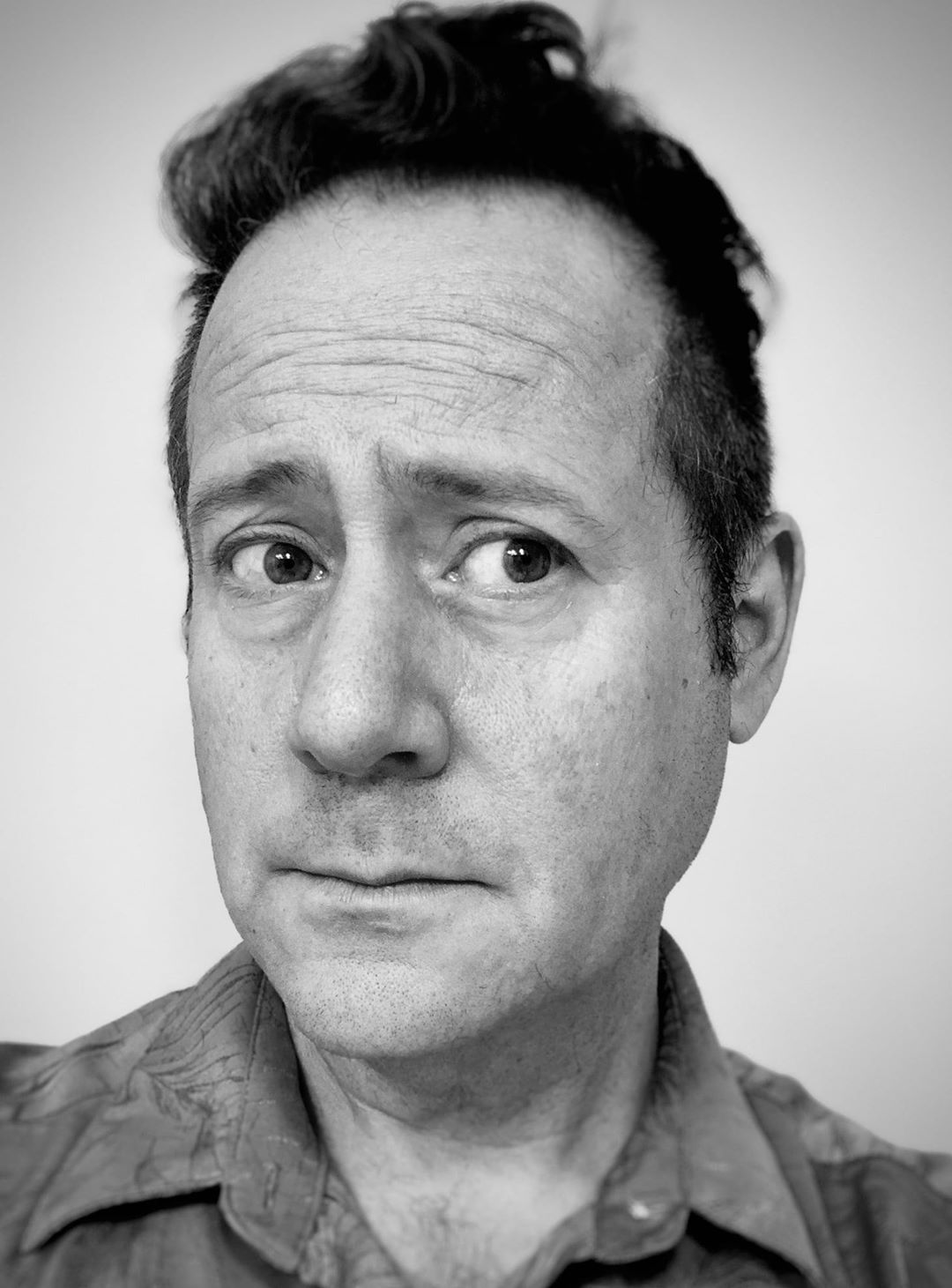
- Ginns at the 2022 Virginia Children's Book Festival
- Education: University of Michigan
- Occupations: Writer, game designer, composer, producer
- Website: russellginns.com

Russell Ginns is a game designer, writer, and composer, primarily known for children's fiction, puzzles, and educational games and songs. He is the author of more than 100 books, including Super Atomic Wombat Girl, Puzzlooies, 1-2-3 Scream! and the Samantha Spinner series. He has created or contributed to several notable software titles, including Castle Infinity, Hooked on Phonics, Reader Rabbit and Half-Life.

== Publishing ==
Ginns worked as an editor for Sesame Street Magazine, 3-2-1 Contact, and The Electric Company. He created the Nintendo Adventure Books series. and several dozen puzzle books, choose-your-own-adventure books, and young adult fiction. Titles include Puzzlooney!, Go Figure, Midnight Science!, and The Big Book of Kids' Puzzles. Ginns created more than 100 workbooks for Sylvan Learning, Dr. Seuss, Berenstain Bears, and Hooked on Phonics.

Between 2013 and 2015, Ginns wrote four collections of board books (The Little Box of Love; The Little Box of Laughs; The Little Box of Bedtime; and The Little Box of Classics) for Houghton Mifflin Harcourt. This series includes Is There a Chance You’ve Seen My Pants?, Bird on My Head, and Monster Love.

In 2017, Random House published the first title in Ginns's book series, Samantha Spinner and the Super-Secret Plans. He wrote My Big Book of Feelings for Rodale Press in 2020, the graphic novel Super Atomic Wombat Girl, and the Puzzlooies, series, a hybrid puzzle-story book format. The initial launch featured twelve titles, including Marooned on the Moon, One of Our Giant Robots Is Missing, and Space Cats to the Rescue. His 2022 title 1-2-3 Scream! is an anthology of humorous horror stories.

Ginns has also been published under the names Clyde Bosco, P. C. Russell Ginns, Jacques Barniarde, Kravis Winewater, Hans Shingle, and R. U. Ginns.

== Games and interactive media ==
Ginns was the lead designer of Castle Infinity, the first MMORPG for kids. He wrote the original story treatment for Valve's Half-Life, as well as games for Hooked on Phonics, Hasbro, Sesame Street, and Lode Runner.

Ginns has worked as a designer/producer with several independent game publishers, developing titles that include Crop Circles, Pop! The Balloon Dog Puzzle Game, and AlphaNatix., Thud!, Mercury Messenger, and Smart Kart.

His published board games include Wordspot, Schmear, Search Party, and Chess on the Loose.

== Bibliography ==
- 1991: Super Mario Bros. Double Trouble ISBN 978-0671741129
- 1991: Super Mario Bros. Leaping Lizards ISBN 978-0671741136
- 1994: Go Figure! Puzzles, Puns, and Funny Figures of Speech ISBN 9780553481822
- 1995: Puzzlooney! ISBN 978-0716765325
- 1996: Midnight Science ISBN 978-0716765691
- 2009: Chick-Chick the Ping-Pong Champ ISBN 978-1940384146
- 2013: Is There a Chance You've Seen My Pants? ISBN 978-0544340282
- 2014: Bird On My Head ISBN 978-0544340213
- 2014: Monster Love ISBN 978-0544357952
- 2016: Samantha Spinner and the Super-secret Plans ISBN 978-1524720001
- 2017: Samantha Spinner and the Spectacular Specs ISBN 978-1524720049
- 2018: Samantha Spinner and the Boy in the Ball ISBN 978-1984849229
- 2019: My Big Book of Feelings ISBN 978-0525571407
- 2020: One of Our Giant Robots Is Missing ISBN 978-0525572084
- 2020: The Last Donut ISBN 978-0525572077
- 2021: Marooned on the Moon ISBN 978-0593450291
- 2021: Don't Feed Fluffy! ISBN 978-0525572169
- 2022: 1-2-3 Scream! ISBN 978-0593374078
