= Starwave =

Defunct software and website company

Starwave Corporation
- Industry: Digital content
- Founded: 1993; 33 years ago
- Defunct: 1998; 28 years ago
- Fate: Acquired by The Walt Disney Company, 1998
- Successor: Walt Disney Internet Group
- Headquarters: Bellevue, Washington, U.S.
- Key people: Paul Allen, Mike Slade, Patrick Naughton

Starwave was a Seattle, Washington-based software and website company, founded in 1993 by Paul Allen, co-founder of Microsoft and led by CEO Mike Slade. The company produced original CD-ROM titles, including Muppets Inside, and titles for Clint Eastwood, Sting, and Peter Gabriel. They were the original developers of Castle Infinity, the first massively multiplayer online role-playing game for children, but Starwave's most lasting mark was in the area of web content sites. They developed ESPN.com, ABCNEWS.com, Outside Online, and Mr. Showbiz.com among other sites, setting the standard for much of the commercial Internet explosion of the late 1990s. Starwave also developed the first site and publishing system for Jim Cramer's TheStreet.com.

== Disney ==
The company merged with Infoseek and was later sold to The Walt Disney Company. In April 1998, Disney purchased the outstanding shares of Starwave from Allen after an initial buy of about 30% in 1997. The new entity, Walt Disney Internet Group (WDIG) developed the Go.com portal.

In 2004, Disney re-activated the Starwave identity as Starwave Mobile, which published casual games for mobile phones. They published several Scarface licensed games including Scarface: Money. Power. Respect. and games from Capybara Games including Critter Crunch.
