= Ghoul Patrol =

1994 video game

- North American SNES box art
- Developers: LucasArts (Note: Lucasfilm Classic Games version developed by DotEmu.); Motion Pixel
- Publishers: JVC Musical Industries; Lucasfilm Games (Re-release)
- Director: Kalani Streicher
- Producers: Kalani Streicher (LucasArts); Andrew Carter (Motion Pixel)
- Designer: Kalani Streicher
- Programmer: Andrew Carter
- Artists: Harrison Fong; Holger Liebnitz; Liu Pee Hieng
- Composers: Eric Swanson (Realtime Associates); David Warhol (Realtime Associates)
- Platforms: Super NES, Microsoft Windows, Nintendo Switch, Xbox One, PlayStation 4
- Release: Super NES: NA: November 1994; PAL: 1994; JP: May 26, 1995; Windows, Switch, Xbox One: WW: June 29, 2021; PlayStation 4: WW: October 28, 2021
- Genre: Run and gun
- Modes: Single-player, multiplayer

Ghoul Patrol is a 1994 run and gun video game developed by LucasArts and published by JVC Musical Industries for the Super Nintendo Entertainment System. It is a sequel to Zombies Ate My Neighbors (1993). In 2021, both games were re-released as part of Lucasfilm Classic Games: Zombies Ate My Neighbors and Ghoul Patrol for Nintendo Switch, PlayStation 4, Xbox One and Windows by Disney Interactive.

== Gameplay ==
The game stars Zeke and Julie, the protagonists from Zombies Ate My Neighbors, who must travel through five worlds to save their town from a horror exhibit come to life.

== Development ==
According to Toshiyasu Morita, a programmer and technology manager at LucasArts during the mid-1990s, this sequel was made by a third party that licensed the use of the Zombies Ate My Neighbors engine for this purpose. Despite the good reviews and reception for Zombies Ate My Neighbors from gamers and critics, Konami refused to be involved in publishing the game, giving JVC the opportunity to step in instead.

The game was developed by LucasArts, but most of the development work was outsourced by a small Malaysian studio called Motion Pixel. It serves as a sequel to Zombies Ate My Neighbors, although it originally did not begin development as a sequel to the game, but merely as an unrelated game that used the same gameplay engine.

== Release ==
It was released by JVC Musical Industries in November 1994 in North America, and later in the year in Europe. A Japanese version was published by the JVC subsidiary Victor Entertainment in 1995.

It was later re-released digitally on the Wii Virtual Console in 2010, and for the Nintendo Switch, Xbox One and Windows in 2021 together with its predecessor.

A Genesis version was under development, but was not released due to time constraints.

== Reception ==
Reception

Review scores
| Publication | Score |
|---|---|
| Computer and Video Games | 81/100 |
| Electronic Gaming Monthly | 8/10, 8/10, 7/10, 8/10, 8/10 |
| GameFan | 79/100, 70/100, 78/100 |
| GamesMaster | 71% |
| Hyper | 70/100 |
| Official Nintendo Magazine | 81/100 |
| Super Play | 82% |
| Total! | (UK) 89/100 (DE) 2- |
| Games World | 73/100 |
| Super Gamer | 67/100 |
| Ultimate Future Games | 89% |
| VideoGames | 7/10 |

Ghoul Patrol received generally favorable reception from critics. GamePro's Bro' Buzz said that "Ghoul Patrol is the closest you can get to the acclaimed Zombies Ate My Neighbors, and it's a worthy successor." They particularly praised the "outrageous 360-degree shoot-em-up action" and detailed, cartoony graphics. Electronic Gaming Monthly's Mike Weigand called it "A worthy sequel to Zombies Ate My Neighbors" and "A great salute to old, late-night horror movies."
