= Samantha Spinner and the Super-Secret Plans =

Children's mystery novel by Russell Ginns

- Author: Russell Ginns
- Audio read by: Kathleen McInerney; Grover Gardner
- Illustrator: Barbara Fisinger
- Series: Samantha Spinner
- Publisher: Delacorte Press
- Publication date: 13 February 2018
- Publication place: United States
- Pages: 256
- ISBN: 978-1-5247-2000-1
- OCLC: 990257306
- LC Class: PZ7.G438943 Sam 2018
- Followed by: Samantha Spinner and the Spectacular Specs
- Website: samanthaspinner.com

Samantha Spinner and the Super-Secret Plans is a children's mystery novel centered on an eponymous character, Samantha, an 11-year-old from Seattle. Her uncle Paul disappeared mysteriously and left her siblings expensive gifts. Her brother, Nipper, received the New York Yankees. Her sister, Buffy, received $2,400,000,000. Samantha received only a rusty red umbrella. Eventually, she discovered that the umbrella lining contains maps and diagrams to secret means of traveling around the globe.

It is the first title in the four-part Samantha Spinner book series, which was released by Random House from 2018–2021.

The underside of the umbrella contains a map of secret passages which they expect will help find Samantha's uncle, but outlaw ninjas from the sewers are in pursuit of them.

The story uses Samantha's brother Nipper as a device to add educational content to the story.

The book was written by Russell Ginns, who has written over 100 books and also designed video game software.

== Countries and landmarks ==
Throughout the series, the characters explore locations, famous and obscure, around the globe. In the first two published books, they visit:

The Louvre and the Eiffel Tower - France; the Florence Duomo and the Fountain of Neptune - Italy; the Temple of Horus - Egypt; Times Square and the Space Needle - USA; The Great Mosque - Mali; Borobudur Temple - Indonesia; Machu Picchu - Peru

== Awards ==
The 2018 audiobook edition, narrated by Kathleen McInerney and Grover Gardner, was listed an Earphones award winner by AudioFile.

== See also ==
- Holes, a young-adult mystery comedy novel by Louis Sachar
- The 39 Clues, a series of collaboratively authored adventure novels
