= Herman Lay =

American businessman

- Portrait of Lay as Chairman of the Board of PepsiCo in 1969
- Born: Herman Warden Lay; March 6, 1909; Charlotte, North Carolina, U.S.
- Died: December 6, 1982 (aged 73); Dallas, Texas, U.S.
- Occupations: Businessman, philanthropist

Herman Warden Lay (March 6, 1909 – December 6, 1982) was an American businessman who was involved in potato chip manufacturing with his eponymous brand of Lay's potato chips. He started H.W. Lay Co., Inc., now part of the Frito-Lay corporation, a subsidiary of PepsiCo.

== Early life ==
Lay was born in Charlotte, North Carolina, on March 6, 1909. His father, Jesse N. Lay, worked for International Harvester, first as a bookkeeper in Charlotte and later as a commercial salesman in Columbia, South Carolina, where the family moved. By 1920, they moved to Greenville, South Carolina. In 1922 his mother died of cancer and his father remarried. He then attended Furman University on an athletic scholarship for two years, but did not graduate.

== Career ==
He began his career at Sunshine Biscuits and was laid off because of the Great Depression. He then worked as a traveling salesman for the Barrett Food Company, when he delivered potato chips to his customers in his Ford Model A. His territory eventually expanded and his profits began to grow. In 1932, he borrowed US$100 and founded the H.W. Lay Distributing Company based in Atlanta, Georgia, a distributor for the Barrett Food Products Company, and began to hire employees. He peddled potato chips from Atlanta to Nashville, Tennessee. By 1937, he had 25 employees, and had begun producing his own line of snack foods.

The H.W. Lay & Company merged with The Frito Company in September 1961, creating the largest-selling snack food company in the United States, the Frito-Lay corporation. In 1965, Herman W. Lay (chairman and chief executive officer of Frito-Lay) and Donald M. Kendall (President and chief executive officer of Pepsi-Cola) merged the two companies and formed PepsiCo, Inc.

A philanthropist, he helped found the Association of Private Enterprise Education (APEE).

== Personal life ==
Lay married Sarah Amelia "Mimi" Harper and had four children. He died at the age of 73 on December 6, 1982. His late son, Herman Warden Lay Jr., was a Dallas-based co-founder of a bottling company in Mexico for Pepsi and 7 Up.

== Legacy ==
The U.S. Chamber of Commerce has a room named after him. His alma mater, Furman University, offers a scholarship in his name. The Furman University Herman W. Lay Physical Activities Center is named after him. The Lay Ornamental Garden in the Dallas Arboretum and Botanical Garden is named after him.

In 1975, Lay received the Golden Plate Award of the American Academy of Achievement.
