= Togetherville =

- Founded: 2008
- Dissolved: March 11, 2012
- Founder: Mandeep Dhillon ＆ Rajveer Tut
- Website: www.togetherville.com

Togetherville was a social networking site geared toward youngsters under age 13 years and their family and friends who use the more popular social networking site Facebook.

Founded in 2008 by Mandeep Dhillon and Rajveer Tut, Togetherville was released in public beta on May 19, 2010. Through online neighborhoods built around each child, the site provides children the experience of an adult social networking site like Facebook.

On February 25, 2011, The Walt Disney Company purchased Togetherville. Mandeep Dhillon became Vice President of TogetherVille and Vice President of Strategy at Disney Interactive.

Togetherville was discontinued on March 11, 2012.
