= Infoseek =

Search engine

- Website type: Search engine
- Successor: Go.com
- Area served: Worldwide
- Owner: Disney Interactive
- Website: infoseek.com
- Commercial: Mixed
- Launched: January 1994; 32 years ago
- Current status: Closed as of 1999

Infoseek (also known as the "big yellow") was an American internet search engine founded in 1994 by Steve Kirsch.

Infoseek was originally operated by the Infoseek Corporation, headquartered in Sunnyvale, California. Infoseek was bought by The Walt Disney Company in 1999, and the technology was merged with that of the Disney-acquired Starwave to form the Go.com network.

== History ==
Infoseek launched in January 1994 as a pay-for-use service. The service was dropped in August 1994 and Infoseek was relaunched as Infoseek search in February 1995.

In 1995, Infoseek struck a deal with Netscape to become the default search engine on Netscape Navigator.

On June 11, 1996, Infoseek's initial public offering started trading on Nasdaq (under the name SEEK) at $12 per share.

In cooperation with Aptex Software (then a division of HNC Software), Infoseek was the first search engine company to develop and launch behavioral targeting, via its UltraMatch targeting algorithms. The developmental partnership with Aptex was announced in 1996 and the technology was released the following year. UltraMatch utilized Aptex's SelectCast neural networking software.

By September 1997, Infoseek had 7.3 million visitors per month. It was the 7th most visited website that year (5th in 1996) and 10th in 1998. Infoseek acquired the WebChat Broadcasting System in April 1998.

In 1998, Disney purchased a 43% stake of Infoseek, and incorporated the site into its various media businesses. Around the same time, Disney acquired the Starwave Corporation, which included ESPN.com and ABCNews.com. In 1999, Disney acquired the remaining Infoseek stock it didn't own. Disney bundled its Starwave properties and Infoseek and formed the GO.com portal. That year, Infoseek engineer Li Yanhong moved to Beijing, China and co-founded the search engine Baidu.

In February 2001, Disney decided to cancel the service and lay off all staff. Also in 2001, Bernt Wahl, Andy Bensky and 15 software engineers, all Infoseek employees, led a management buyout attempt from Disney but were ultimately rebuffed.

=== Post-demise ===
Infoseek's Ultraseek Server software technology, an enterprise search engine product, was sold in 2000 to Inktomi. Under Inktomi, Ultraseek Server was renamed "Inktomi Enterprise Search". In December 2002 (prior to the Yahoo! acquisition of Inktomi), the Ultraseek product suite was sold to a competitor Verity Inc, who re-established the Ultraseek brand name and continued development of the product.

Rakuten agreed in November 2000 to acquire Infoseek Japan for $81 million.

In December 2005, Verity was acquired by Autonomy PLC. Under Autonomy, Ultraseek ceased to be a stand-alone product and became a modular component under the IDOL platform. It continued to be developed and marketed as Autonomy's entry-level keyword-based site search offering until after Autonomy was acquired by Hewlett-Packard (HP) in October 2011.

== Domain name ==
The "infoseek.com" domain name redirects to "go.com" and the Infoseek brand name is no longer used in North America. However, the Australian domain and the Japanese domain still operate with the Infoseek name. The Japanese domain name now operates as a web portal known as "Rakuten Infoseek". "infoseek.ai" is a different company, an AI platform.

== See also ==
- List of search engines
- List of assets owned by Disney
