= Kerpoof =

Children's entertainment and educational website

Kerpoof.com
- Website type: Education
- Available in: English
- Dissolved: April 15, 2014
- Owner: The Walt Disney Company
- Creator: Disney Online Boulder Studios
- Website: http://games.disney.com/kerpoof
- Launched: March, 2006
- Current status: Defunct

Kerpoof was a children's entertainment and educational website produced by Disney Online Kerpoof Studios, part of Disney Interactive Media Group. Users create cartoon avatars and earn Kerpoof Koins by making, sharing, and voting on virtual artwork. Based in Boulder, CO, Kerpoof was launched in 2007 and has grown to support a large community of users – prior to the Disney purchase, its traffic grew 30% a month on average. Revenue is generated through paid memberships, which allow users to access additional features, such as exclusive characters and avatar accessories. Kerpoof was acquired by The Walt Disney Company in February 2009, and the studio has since launched a suite of interactive entertainment activities on Disney.com, including an original site called Create.

The site was designed for children ages 3 and up, and is used extensively in schools (educators may apply for free teacher accounts, which give them access to additional features). As such, child safety is emphasized – filtering and moderators restrict what artwork may be published in the community gallery.

Kerpoof has won numerous awards in the Children's Technology industry, including the Children's Technology Review Editor's Choice Award in 2008 and the Parents’ Choice Gold Award in 2008-2011.

== History and development ==
Kerpoof was founded in March 2006 by Krista Marks, Tom Fischaber, Brent Milne and Jonathan Ballagh, and launched its first public product in January 2007. The company has partnered with non-profit organizations such as the National Center for Women and Information Technology and the BizWorld Foundation in order to produce fun and educational content, and its Make a Movie application was supported by two SBIR awards from the National Science Foundation, totaling $150,000. In September 2007, Kerpoof was selected to participate in TechCrunch 40, and launched Make a Movie at that event.

== Activities ==
- Make a Picture - This activity is akin to an electronic felt board – users can choose a scene and drag characters into it, adjusting their size and aspect ratio. It reinforces the notion of perspective and foreground vs. background.
- Make a Drawing - Users draw on a blank canvas using different pens and fills ("sold" for Koins in the Kerpoof store).
- Make a Movie - Users can create their own movies, from pirate scenes to fairy tales. The software is designed to teach basic programming concepts.
- Tell a Story - A virtual storybook with a number of different storylines that emphasizes narrative and sequencing.
- Make a Card - Users can make cards for a range of occasions, from birthdays to Earth Day, or just for fun.
- Spell a Picture - Designed for younger students, users can add objects to a scene by correctly spelling that object.

== Child safety ==
Kerpoof puts great emphasis on child safety. Safety standards are maintained by:

- Preventing use of inappropriate usernames
- Using an automatic filter which blocks profanity and other inappropriate language
- Employing trained moderators to examine all content submitted for publication on the site
- No advertisements or links to outside sites

Users who submit extremely inappropriate material are held to a “three strikes and you’re out” policy.

== Educational uses ==
Kerpoof is used widely in educational institutions, both in the U.S. and abroad. Educators may apply for free teacher accounts to gain access to a range of administrative tools that allow them to manage their students’ accounts and view assignments online. Kerpoof publishes an e-newsletter for educators, and provides free Kerpoof-based lesson plans on subjects ranging from Art History to Math.

== Memberships ==
Users may apply for paid memberships (at rates of $4.39 for one month, $24.79 for six months and $44.79 for one year). Members receive benefits like safe chat, Buddy Draw, and the ability to unlock new avatar accessories, special effects, music, and characters.

== Reception ==
Kerpoof has been well received by the Children's Technology Industry and the press, and was awarded the Children's Technology Review Editor's Choice Award in 2007, 2008 and 2010, the Parents’ Choice Gold Award in 2008-2011, and the American Association of School Librarians Best Websites for Teaching and Learning in 2011.

Here, the images are interesting and varied, the themes go well beyond the scope of pirates and fairy gardens… Although bargain and quality don’t always appear in the same sentence, Kerpoof breaks the mold – again. - Parents’ Choice Awards

Kerpoof was also included in a list of “healthy (and fun) options from around the Web for children” in a New York Times article by Lisa Guernsey.

== Disney.com ==
Since its acquisition by The Walt Disney Company, Kerpoof Studios has integrated its tools for making pictures and printable coloring book pages into Disney.com Preschool and other franchise sites on Disney.com, including Cars and Toy Story.

=== Create ===
In August, 2009, Disney Online Kerpoof Studios launched Disney.com/Create. The initial launch featured a suite of four activities:

- URock2 Digital Painter – Similar to Kerpoof's Make a Drawing, the Digital Painter is a blank canvas. Users play with pens, fills, and stamps of Disney characters.
- DoubleDuck Comic Creator – Users can write their own comic, using characters inspired by Donald Duck.
- Animods – Users create their own virtual pet (dog, hamster, or bird) by either drawing body parts onto a schema or clicking and dragging in premade parts.
- JONAS and High School Musical Photo Mashup – Users click and drag pictures of Disney stars into a canvas, add backgrounds and stamps to create their own design.

Kerpoof Studios has continued to add content to Disney.com/Create, including photo mashups for Disney franchises such as Phineas and Ferb, The Princess and the Frog, and The Nightmare Before Christmas, and new Comic Creators, Animods, Digital Painters, Music Slideshows, and an animated Flip Book.

The Create Portal's reception has been positive. The site was nominated for a 2010 KAPi Award, and was featured in the New York Times Personal Tech section:

Create, a minisite for Web creativity tools on Disney.com, has Digital Painter at its core, with features that Photoshop users used to dream about … So now, in spirit anyway, even the youngest child can be a Disney artist. Walt Disney would most likely approve. -Warren Buckleitner
