= Samantha Greenberg =

American financial executive and hedge fund manager

- Education: Wharton School of the University of Pennsylvania; Stanford University
- Occupation: Chief financial officer of AlphaSense

Samantha Greenberg is an American financial executive who has been the chief financial officer (CFO) of the market intelligence company AlphaSense since April 2026. She was previously CFO of the digital identity network ID.me and of Mint House, and before that the founder, managing partner and chief investment officer (CIO) of Margate Capital Management. Her specialist areas are Technology, Media & Telecommunications (TMT) and Consumer industries.

== Education ==
Greenberg graduated summa cum laude from the Wharton School of the University of Pennsylvania with a BS in economics and finance (featuring a dual concentration in finance and strategic management) and an MBA at Stanford University.

== Career ==
Before establishing Margate Capital Management, Greenberg was an investment banking analyst at the mergers and acquisitions department at Goldman Sachs Group (1998), an associate at Francisco Partners (1999), and a vice-president in the investment analysis division at Chilton Investment Co. (2003). She then went back to Goldman as a vice-president in the firm's Special Situations Group.

In 2009 Greenberg took up a position at Paulson & Co. as head of the media, cable, satellite and consumer sectors. Two years later she was promoted to partner. During her time at Paulson, she trained and managed junior analysts and worked on the team that guided successful investments in firms including Cablevision, Comcast, Family Dollar and Time Warner Cable. Her last day at Paulson was January 29, 2016.

In 2019, Greenberg took a position at Citadel LLC as a portfolio manager.

In 2021, she joined Mint House as its chief financial officer.

In April 2023, Greenberg was appointed chief financial officer of the digital identity network ID.me, concurrent with the company's $132 million Series D funding round.

In April 2026, she became chief financial officer of AlphaSense, an AI-driven market intelligence company.

== Margate Capital Management ==
Greenberg launched the Margate Capital Management hedge fund at the end of January 2016. The firm operates a long/short equity fund with a focus on the media and consumer sectors, implementing a rules-based risk approach to protect capital and reduce volatility. On April 12, 2016, she received a seed money commitment of $130 million from Ramius LLC (the international investment management firm of Cowen Group Inc.) Ramius is the firm's first investor, making a three-year commitment. In 2019, Greenberg closed Margate Capital to join Citadel.

== Philanthropy ==
Greenberg is co-vice chair of the investment management division of the UJA-Federation of New York. She sits on the board of directors of the 14th Street Y, and volunteers at the Young Women's Leadership Network.

== Honors and recognition ==
Business Insider reporters referred to Greenberg as “one of the industry’s rare female hedge fund managers.” Prior to the establishment of her own hedge fund, she was named one of the 50 Leading Women in Hedge Funds in 2013 by the Hedge Fund Journal in association with Ernst & Young. In 2016 she was named the Hedge Fund Rising Star by Institutional Investor.
