= Chrome Industries =

American clothing company

- Industry: Apparel Bags Footwear
- Headquarters: Portland, Oregon, U.S. (2017–Present)
- Products: Messenger Bags, Footwear, Apparel
- Number of employees: 24 (2021)
- Website: chromeindustries.com

Chrome Industries is a global manufacturer of messenger bags, backpacks, sling bags, travel bags, utility cycling apparel and utility cycling footwear geared specifically for the bike messenger and fixed gear scenes. After establishing a reputation in Boulder, Colorado in 1995, Chrome moved to Denver for several years before relocating in 2002 to San Francisco. In June 2017, the company moved its headquarters to Portland, Oregon. In August 2010, Chrome opened its second retail store in Manhattan, New York, and had retail locations in Chicago, Portland, Seattle, Minneapolis, a second San Francisco location in the Mission District, Denver, Brooklyn, and Washington, DC.

== Manufacturing ==
Their bags are built with industrial materials including tarpaulin, Cordura and steel. Chrome's popular bag lines, the Mini-Metro and Citizen Messenger Bag, are recognizable by their signature seatbelt buckle release that doubles as a bottle opener. The company started building their bags in a garage in Colorado using salvaged materials like seatbelt buckles and seatbelt webbing, which they continue to use across their entire range of product offerings.

They have since expanded to incorporate an apparel line, which includes their best-selling Merino Wool Cobra hoodie, and a shoe line including their best-selling low-profile design Kursk street shoe with built-in cycling functionalities such as reflective hits, shoelace garage, skid resistant soles and polyurethane contoured crash pad insole.

== Athletic sponsorships and company partnerships ==
Chrome's previous sponsored athletes included professional skateboarders John Cardiel, John Igei, Massan Fluker, Damian Riehl, Alonso Tal, and Cody Lockwood.

Chrome partnerships have incorporated such companies and entities as Bad Religion, Krooked Skateboards, Motörhead, Artist and illustrator, Pat Perry, Tim Kasher, and philanthropic organizations such as the World Food Programme and San Francisco's St. Anthony Foundation.
