= Rosenblatt Securities =

Rosenblatt Securities Inc.
- Company type: Private
- Industry: Financial services
- Founded: 1979
- Founder: Richard A. Rosenblatt
- Headquarters: New York City
- Key people: Richard Rosenblatt (Founder & Chairman); Joseph C. Gawronski (President & CEO)
- Services: Institutional brokerage, investment banking, market structure analysis, equity research
- Website: www.rblt.com

Rosenblatt Securities is an independent institutional brokerage and investment bank headquartered in New York City. Founded in 1979, the firm is recognized as the largest floor broker on the New York Stock Exchange (NYSE) by volume. It specializes in market-structure analysis and execution services for institutional investors, including pension funds, asset managers, and sovereign wealth funds.

== History ==
The firm was founded in 1979 by Richard A. Rosenblatt as an agency-only floor trading boutique on the NYSE. Originally known as Richard A. Rosenblatt & Company, the firm's registration with the Securities and Exchange Commission (SEC) and the NYSE became effective in September 1979.

In 1989, the firm became one of the first to provide institutional clients with electronic direct market access (DMA) to the NYSE via a joint venture with a technology provider. During the same period, it was among the first boutique firms to trade Nasdaq stocks solely as an agent, a departure from the market-making model prevalent at the time.

In 2002, Joseph Gawronski joined the firm and established its market-structure analysis group, which provides intelligence on global exchange volumes and regulatory developments. The firm launched an investment banking group in 2009, focusing on the FinTech and technology sectors.

== Operations ==
Rosenblatt Securities operates as an agency-only broker, meaning it does not engage in proprietary trading or act as a market maker.

The firm's core business lines include:

- Market structure analysis: research on equity market fragmentation and regulatory shifts such as Regulation NMS.
- Equity research: fundamental analysis focusing on the technology, media, and telecommunications sectors.
- Investment banking: advisory services for mergers and acquisitions (M&A) and capital raising, specifically for FinTech companies.

== Regulatory and public impact ==
The firm's executives have provided expert testimony to the United States Congress regarding the evolution of U.S. equity markets. In 2012 and 2024, firm leaders testified before the United States House Committee on Financial Services regarding the impact of high-frequency trading and market fragmentation on investors.

== Awards and recognition ==
In 2021 and 2023, Rosenblatt was named "Best Firm for Market Structure and Execution Consulting" by Financial News at its annual Trading and Tech Awards.
