= Go.com =

Landing page for Disney Internet content

- Logo used from 2000 to 2010
- Website type: Web portal
- Available in: English
- Owners: Disney Interactive (The Walt Disney Company)
- Creators: Disney Interactive Media Group (The Walt Disney Company)
- Website: www.go.com
- Commercial: yes
- Launched: January 9, 1998; 28 years ago

Go.com (also known as The Go Network) is a portal for Disney content and a single sign-on system that was created after The Walt Disney Company acquired the search engine Infoseek. Go.com is operated by Disney Interactive's Disney Online. It began as a web portal launched by Jeff Gold. Go.com includes content from ABC News, which is owned by Walt Disney Television and is hosted under a .go.com name. Along with Time Warner's Pathfinder.com, Go.com proved to be an expensive failure for its parent company, as web users largely preferred to use search engines to access content directly, rather than using directories. In 2013, the site was transitioned from a general-interest portal to a simple landing page.

== History ==
Go.com's original logo used from 1998 to 1999 as Go Network

On January 9, 1998, Disney registered Go.com. Infoseek and Disney Interactive Media Group joint ventured in developing the Go Network, an internet portal. Go.com was launched on January 15, 1999, as a portal with content from ABCNews.com, ESPN.com and Disney.

With Disney's purchase of the remainder of Infoseek in July 1999, the Go Network, Infoseek, the Disney Catalog, Disney Online (Disney.com and DisneyStore.com), ABC News Internet Ventures, ESPN Internet Ventures, and Buena Vista Internet Group were merged into the Go.com company; the company was 72% Disney-owned, with the other outstanding ownership in a tracking stock.

In October 1999, the Go Guides program, a user-edited directory like DMOZ, was launched.

In January 2000, Go.com was forced to abandon its original stoplight logo because of a complaint of similar-looking logos filed by GoTo.com. Concurrently, Go.com company officials announced it was shifting from a general appeal portal to featuring entertainment content. A court later ruled that Go.com had to pay $21.5 million in damages to GoTo.com.

In January 2001, Disney announced that it would be closing Go.com and its search engine, laying off approximately 400 employees and retiring the go.com tracking stock. Also announced was the closing of Go.com's volunteer-edited directory. With the closing, some volunteers created, or migrated to, offshoot directories including JoeAnt, Goguides.org, and Skaffe.com.

In March 2001, Go.com dropped its internal search engine in favor of GoTo.com search results.

== Current status ==
Despite its announcement, Go.com never ceased operations. Instead, in March 2001, the site ended its search engine and switched to a search engine provided by goto.com, whose parent, Overture Services, Inc, was eventually purchased by Yahoo!.

Go.com terminated its email service on August 31, 2010.

In 2013, Disney retired the Go.com logo and branding, turning the domain into a Disney-branded landing page without a search engine. The properties of Disney Interactive then began the process of moving the connection of user accounts off from depending on the Go.com domain to a different type of system not dependent solely on one domain. Throughout 2014 and 2015, the ABC Owned Television Stations began to move to only using their on-air domains, mainly for social media considerations. For example, the website ABC 7 in Chicago had been hosted at abclocal.go.com/wls but is now instead hosted on abc7chicago.com.

In 2016, some of Disney's sites, including ABC's network and news divisions and Disney's cable networks continued to be hosted on the go.com domain, although a base address was used for branding and simplicity purposes; for example, the website for Freeform redirected to freeform.go.com. As of 2022, the Freeform website is hosted solely on the freeform.com domain name.

In August 2016, ESPN.com switched to solely using that domain instead of espn.go.com, tying into the improved Disney Enterprise Technology user account and registration process now hosted at disney.com, rather than a rumored issue involving the resolution of "301" error notices from the former espn.com redirect causing lower search result rankings.

As of November 2026, the only actively maintained website to use a go.com subdomain is the Disney Parks's website.
