= Susan MacLaury =

American film producer

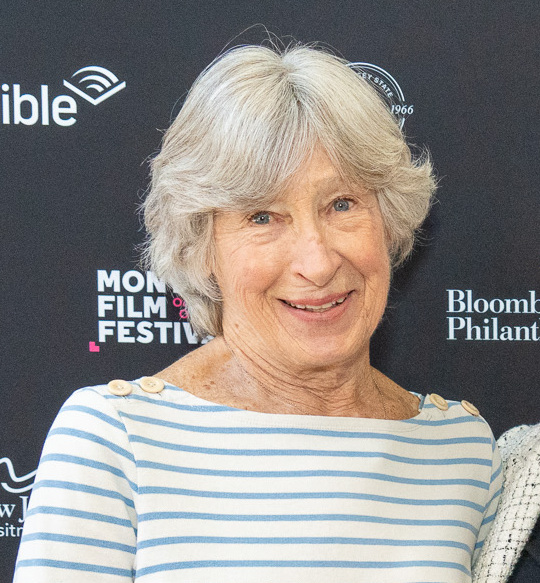
- Known for: co-founder and executive director of Shine Global
- Spouse: Albie Hecht

Susan MacLaury is the co-founder and executive director of the non-profit media company Shine Global, a licensed social worker, and a retired educator. She is also an Emmy-winning and Academy Award-nominated producer.

== Career ==
MacLaury was a full-time Associate Professor of Health Education at Kean University from 1994 through 2014.

In 2005, MacLaury and her husband Albie Hecht founded Shine Global, a non-profit media company with the mission to give voice to children by telling stories of their resilience to raise awareness, promote action, and inspire change. MacLaury won an Emmy and was nominated for an Oscar for her work as executive producer of the 2007 documentary War/Dance. War/Dance won best documentary and best cinematography at the 31st News & Documentary Emmy Awards in 2010. She is also the Executive Producer of several other films including The Harvest (2010 film) with Executive Producer Eva Longoria, the Academy Award winning short documentary Inocente, and the 3D documentary 1 Way Up.

On May 14th, 2020 Susan MacLaury received an honorary doctoral degree from SUNY Cortland, her alma mater. She was also asked to deliver the keynote address during the morning undergraduate ceremony.

== Filmography ==
- Comedy Against the Odds (2023)
- Home Is Somewhere Else (2022)
- Through Our Eyes (2021)
- Virtually Free (2020)
- Daniel & Melissa (2018)
- The Election Effect (2018)
- Tre Maison Dasan (2018)
- Liyana (2017)
- The Wrong Light (2016)
- The Eagle Huntress (2016)
- 1 Way Up: The Story of Peckham BMX (2014)
- Inocente (2012)
- The Harvest/La Cosecha (2011)
- War Dance Returns (2009)
- War Dance (2007)
