= United States women's national soccer team pay discrimination claim =

Gender pay gap litigation, from 2016

Retired player Brandi Chastain talking about the importance of equal pay regarding the U.S. women's national soccer team pay discrimination claim in 2019.

Starting in 2016, players for the United States women's national soccer team (USWNT) have engaged in a series of legal actions against the United States Soccer Federation (USSF). These legal actions allege an unequal treatment and compensation of the USWNT, as compared to the U.S. men's national soccer team (USMNT). The process started with a federal complaint submitted to the Equal Employment Opportunity Commission in 2016, with notable moments throughout 2017, 2019, 2020, and 2022. The dispute has received widespread media attention, inspired legislative action in the U.S. Senate, and received fan support. The 2021 documentary film, LFG also details the story of the U.S. women's national soccer team and their pay dispute. A landmark equal pay agreement was reached in February 2022.

== History of pay discrepancy ==
Both the women’s and the men’s national teams are required to play 20 exhibition matches per year, but were compensated very differently as of March 2016. If the women were to lose all 20 games, they would be paid $72,000 but the men would earn $100,000 for the same record. If the women won all 20 exhibition games, they only had the potential to earn $99,000 while the men would earn an average of $263,320 for this achievement.

World Cup bonuses are also extremely unequal. The USWNT bonuses are as follows: $20,000 for 3rd place, $32,500 for 2nd place, $75,000 for 1st place. The men’s team earns the following bonuses: $52,083 for 3rd, $260,417 for 2nd, $390,625 for 1st. The pay structure for advancement is so disparate that the women’s national team was awarded $2 million for winning the 2015 World Cup, but the men’s team earned $9 million for failing to advance past the 2014 World Cup’s round of 16.

The female athletes are paid $3,000 for each sponsor appearance, less than the $3,750 earned by men. When traveling for camp, either domestically or internationally, the USWNT is paid less ($50 to $60 per diem) in daily allowance than the USMNT ($62.50 to $75 per diem).

As of March 2016, the USWNT earned between $3,600 and $4,950 per national team game while the men’s team earned between $6,250 and $17,625 per game. The World Cup roster bonus for women was $30,000, just 44% of what the men were awarded at $68,750.

== 2016: Federal complaint ==
In March 2016, five female players (Alex Morgan, Hope Solo, Carli Lloyd, Megan Rapinoe, and Becky Sauerbrunn) filed a federal complaint with the Equal Employment Opportunity Commission accusing the Federation of sustaining a payment structure that pays female players less than their male counterparts. This is in violation of Title VII and the Equal Pay Act.

In April 2016, Carli Lloyd published an essay in the New York Times entitled "Why I'm Fighting for Equal Pay," which emphasized that the U.S. women's team generates more revenue for the U.S. Soccer Federation, but that the Federation was still unwilling to pay the women comparably to the male players.

Separately, in February 2016, the U.S. Women's National Team Players Association filed a complaint in U.S. District court seeking to void an extension of its collective bargaining agreement with the United States Soccer Federation through the end of 2016. On July 3, 2016, the court ruled that the extension was valid and that the Players Association was bound by a no-strike provision in the agreement until December 31, 2016.

== 2017: Restructuring the United States Women’s National Team Players Association ==
The restructuring of the USWNT players association was a necessary part of the collective bargaining agreement (CBA) process that the players and USSF had been engaged in. It started with the firing of the legal counsel and head of the players union, Rich Nichols, on December 28, 2016, just three days before the USWNT’s CBA was set to expire. The players wanted to be more involved, and restructured the association to address that. They maintained the CBA committee, a finance committee, and created new subcommittees addressing things like alumni engagement, the National Women’s Soccer League (NWSL), member relations, commercial business, and social impact. They hired a management consultant, Becca Roux, to be the new director of the players association in February 2017.

Negotiations resumed on February 4, 2017. The national team proposed a collaborative relationship with U.S. Soccer and focused on equitable pay, suggesting a revenue-sharing model. The national team also took back exclusive control over licensing rights and agreed to commercial rights of $350,000 annually. The number of national team contracts was cut from 24 to 20 in 2017, decreasing by one each year until it stabilized at 16 in 2021. This created space for bigger bonuses and overall higher compensation, even though less money was guaranteed to players.

Friendly win bonuses increased from $1,350 to a minimum of $5,250 with potential of up to $8,500 depending on their opponent. Un-contracted roster players would now receive $3,500 per game until 2021, when it would increase to $3,750. This is a step up from the previous $0 earned for making a friendly roster, but still below the men’s team at $5,000. Contracted players do not receive match-appearance fees, and instead earn a $100,000 base salary. Equal treatment was also addressed in the new contract, which required the USSF to inspect fields on game day to ensure that they are in satisfactory, safe condition for soccer play.

The last negotiation session was held on April 3, 2017 during the national team’s training camp. The new contract was ratified on April 4, 2017.

== Gender discrimination lawsuit ==
=== 2019 ===
On March 8, 2019 (International Women's Day) the 28 players of the USWNT filed a gender discrimination lawsuit against the United States Soccer Federation in the United States District Court in Los Angeles. Their class-action lawsuit asserted that the USSF violated the Equal Pay Act of 1963 (EPA) and Title VII. The 2019 lawsuit claimed that discrimination by the Federation impacted player compensation, where and how frequently they play, training, medical treatment, coaching, and travel arrangements to matches. This action brought an end to the 2016 Equal Employment Opportunity Commission complaint, which was never resolved.

On the claims of wage discrimination, the petitioners pointed out that United States men's national soccer team (USMNT) receive a $5,000 bonus for a loss in a friendly match, while women receive nothing for a loss or a draw. However, when the teams win, the men receive as much as $17,625, but women only receive $1,350. Further, in 2011, when the women placed second in their World Cup, they were awarded $1.8 million, split evenly among the 24 players on the team. The men's team made it only to the round of 16 that year, yet they were awarded $5 million. In 2014, when Germany won the Men's World Cup, the U.S. team was awarded $35 million by FIFA, while the women received 5% of that for their Cup victory in 2015.

The United States Soccer Federation responded to the complaint in a statement detailing its efforts to promote women's soccer, including its support of the National Women's Soccer League.

=== 2020 ===
Late on Thursday, February 20, 2020, both the USSF and the USWNT filed motions in a California federal court that each proposed an end to the gender discrimination trial. The two proposals sought very different outcomes.

The USWNT claimed that because the USSF was clearly in violation of the Equal Pay Act and Title VII, two federal laws, they desired summary judgment. It was calculated that the women were owed $66,722,148 in back pay and damages. This number was determined by evaluating the women’s match performances, schedules, and match results and then calculating what the USMNT would have earned under their contract compensation. Calculations include World Cup bonuses paid by FIFA for the Men’s World Cup.

In May 2020, U.S. District Judge R. Gary Klausner dismissed the unequal pay portion of the lawsuit, while allowing the claims of discriminatory work conditions to proceed. Judge Klausner found that the USWNT were paid more in total and more per game than the USMNT during the contested years. The Judge also noted that the USWNT were offered a similar “pay for play” agreement but rejected that offer.

=== 2021 ===
In October 2021, Klausner approved a settlement between U.S. Soccer and the women's team on working conditions. Following that agreement, the players appealed Klausner's dismissal of their equal pay complaints. Their argument was that the district court reached their dismissal by looking at total pay between the women and the men, without accounting for the women’s superior performance. The USWNT legal counsel argued in their appeal that the court held that pay is equal if a woman can obtain the same amount of money as a man only by working more and performing better, which is not the law. That is not the law. They also claimed that the court discounted the women’s direct evidence of discrimination, which is not allowed on summary judgment. The USMNT players association filed an amicus curiae in support of the appeal, stating that "the men stand with the women in their fight to secure the equal pay they deserve." The Equal Employment Opportunity Commission also filed an amicus curiae in support of the plaintiffs (the USWNT) and in favor of reversal. The brief stated "the EEOC has a strong enforcement interest in the proper analysis of pay discrimination claims under the EPA and Title VII" as reasoning for why the EEOC chose to offer its views to the court. The EEOC believed that the court should revise two errors in ruling. First was whether the plaintiffs could establish a prima facie case of discrimination under the EPA. Second was granting summary judgment to the defendants (the USSF) on the plaintiffs’ Title VII disparate-pay claim.

=== 2022 ===
Oral arguments in an appeal filed to the 9th Circuit Court of Appeals began in early 2022. The U.S. women's team's collective bargaining agreement expired at the end of December, 2021, and the U.S. Soccer Federation expressed hoped that a resolution could be reached outside the court system.

On February 22, 2022, U.S. Women's National Team players filed an Equal Employment Opportunity Commission complaint over inequality in pay and treatment, the U.S. Soccer Federation agreed to a landmark $24 million agreement which will see tens of millions of dollars in back pay owed to female players. The terms of settlement also require equal pay for both male and female soccer player for friendlies, tournaments, and the World Cup. This means that the USWNT will receive a share of the prize money from the 2022 FIFA World Cup games. They received more from the USMNT games in the group stage of the 2022 World Cup than the total they received for winning the past two FIFA Women's World Cup tournaments. Federation president Cindy Parlow Crow adds, "We have a lot of work to do and continuing to rebuild the relationship with the players."

=== 2023 ===
In June of 2022, the equal pay lawsuit was settled, though further concerns linger. FIFPRO's survey revealed that almost a third of players did not receive payment from their national teams over 18 months, with two-thirds reporting having to take unpaid leave from other jobs to play for their national teams. Even though the women's Euro 2022 final between England and Germany showcased remarkable talent, prize money at major tournaments still lags behind the men’s teams. A recent CNN Analysis showed that soccer players at the 2023 Women's World Cup earned on average just 25 cents for every dollar earned by men at their World Cup the previous year, though this marks an improvement from less than eight cents per dollar in 2019. Despite this, FIFA President Infantino dismissed the notion of equal pay in the Women's World Cup as a mere "slogan that comes up now and then." However, in June of 2023, it was announced that, for the first time, approximately $49 million of the record $110 million World Cup prize money would directly benefit individual players, with each player on the winning team receiving at least $270,000.

== Impact on women's sports ==
In a 2016 dissertation, University of Iowa PhD candidate Eileen Marie Narcotta-Welp stated, "the U.S. women's national team is a production of a particular historical cultural formation; thus, it can not exist outside of the neoliberal, postfeminist, and post-racial context that created it." This statement can be applied to women's teams in many sports, whether in professional, collegiate, when representing a country, or in other opportunities for female sports. Because the USWNT was created in this context, it cannot be separated from its roots. Consequently, the women's national team has had a considerable impact on other women's soccer teams and other women's sports in advancing their fights for equality. When the equal pay agreement for USWNT players occurred in February 2022, Megan Rapinoe believed that it was "not only a victory for the USWNT, but for all women's sports as female athletes fight for equal pay."

=== Canadian women's national soccer team ===
Other women’s teams have faced similar opposition as the USWNT, and the women’s national team is supporting these women in their fights for equal pay and treatment. The Canadian women’s national soccer team had been told that Canada Soccer would be cutting funding to the women’s national soccer team program, meaning that Canada Soccer would not adequately fund the Canadian women’s national team just six months away from the 2023 Women’s World Cup. The players association released a statement criticizing Canada Soccer’s actions but stating that they could not afford personal risks associated with striking. The United States Women’s National Team was eager to support the Canadian women, in whatever way they needed. They acknowledged that this may look differently than what the U.S. women needed during their fight.

=== WNBA ===
The Women’s National Basketball Association (WNBA) in the United States decided to opt out of their collective bargaining agreement on November 1, 2018, led by a Players’ Tribune letter from the Women’s National Basketball Players Association (WNBPA) president Nneka Ogwumike. They were supported by Becca Roux (director of the USWNT players association) and the national soccer team players, with Roux closely collaborating with WNBPA executive director, Terri Jackson.

=== United States women's national ice hockey team ===
The United States Women’s national hockey team also sought support from the national soccer team in the fall of 2017. One female hockey player reached out wondering if the soccer team’s players association could recommend a marketing consultant that would support unfulfilled marketing promises made by U.S.A. Hockey. The gold medal contender team did not even have its own social media accounts just months before the Pyeongchang Olympics. USWNT players, including Alex Morgan and Carli Lloyd, publicly supported the hockey team’s decision to boycott the 2017 IIHF Women’s World Championship unless their demands for equal treatment among the hockey programs were met.

== Reactions and popular media ==
In 2019, Senator Joe Manchin of West Virginia introduced a bill that proposed to cut off all federal funding to the men's 2026 FIFA World Cup until the women received equal pay. In 2020, then U.S. presidential candidate Joe Biden called on the team to not "give up this fight," and demand U.S. Soccer "pay now," or "when I'm president, you can go elsewhere for World Cup funding." The lawsuit from the USWNT members is similar to actions in other sports and employment fields where women are systematically paid less than their male counterparts. The attention reignited a conversation about the pay disparities of genders in the workplace. Following the 2019 World Cup victory of the U.S. women's team, Senator Kamala Harris said, "As we celebrate the @USWNT today, it's on us to take up their charge and fight for equal pay. Let's flip the script and hold corporations accountable by requiring them to prove they're not engaging in pay discrimination — and fine companies that fail to close their pay gaps."

== Documentary film ==
The story of the U.S. women's national soccer team and their fight for equal pay was the subject of the 2021 documentary film LFG directed and produced by Andrea Nix Fine and Sean Fine.
