= Albie Hecht =

American film producer

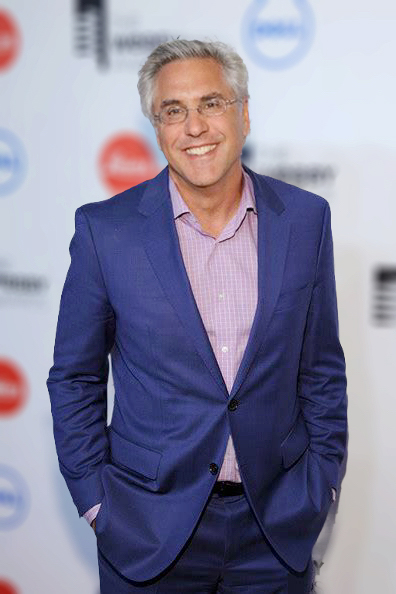
- Hecht in 2023
- Education: Columbia University
- Occupations: Producer, entertainment executive
- Known for: Television industry
- Notable work: Pocket.watch; War/Dance; Worldwide Biggies; Shine Global; Kids Choice Awards; GUTS
- Television: Nickelodeon, Spike TV, HLN
- Spouse: Susan MacLaury
- Children: 2

Albie Hecht is an American film and television producer and media executive. In 1997, Hecht was the president of film and TV entertainment for Nickelodeon before becoming president of the television channel Spike TV in 2003. In 2005, he founded and was CEO of the digital studio Worldwide Biggies. From 2013 to 2015, he also served as general manager of the TV channel, HLN, and is chief content officer of PocketWatch. In 2026, Amazon MGM Studios announced a partnership with Hecht to produce content using AI tools.

== Early life and career ==
Albie Hecht graduated from Francis Lewis High School in Queens, New York City where he played varsity basketball and baseball and was President of the Student Organization. He was the only undergraduate ever awarded a Media Studies degree by Columbia University’s Columbia College.

Hecht was Director of Artist Relations at Terry Cashman and Tommy West's Lifesong Records in the 1970s, where he oversaw the career of Crack the Sky and then became manager to pop star Dean Friedman.

== Television ==
In the mid-1980s, Hecht produced for the advertising agency Fred/Alan Inc with Alan Goodman and Fred Seibert. Together, they established Chauncey Street Productions for their independent television productions.

Through Chauncey Street, Hecht co-created and executive produced Kids Court and GUTS for Nickelodeon, the Ace Award winning game show Turn it Up! for MTV and The Talent Pool for Comedy Central, which featured the TV debut of John Leguizamo.

At Nickelodeon, Hecht oversaw the development and approval of all the network's films and TV shows from 1997 to 2003, including SpongeBob SquarePants, Dora the Explorer, Blue's Clues, and such live-action shows as All That. He also co-created and executive produced the Nickelodeon Kids' Choice Awards, and built the Nick Digital Studio in New York City and the Nick animation studio in Los Angeles. When establishing his independent production company Worldwide Biggies, Hecht developed and executive produced The Naked Brothers Band (2007–09).

When Hecht became the president of the TV channel TNN, he revised the network's title to Spike TV, where his shows included The Joe Schmo Show, MXC and signing the Ultimate Fighting Championship franchise.

In 2017, Hecht joined Pocket.watch as chief content officer. Pocket.watch is a studio that creates franchises from the YouTube stars and characters. Hecht is the creator and Executive Producer of Ryan's Mystery Playdate on the Nick Jr. Channel, the number one preschool show on TV which garnered a Daytime Emmy Award Nomination in 2020. He also produced the HobbyKids Adventures, an animated series which streams on the Hobby Kids TV YouTube channel. The show has received over 30 million views of its episodes to date.

As of 2022, Hecht is the chief content officer of pocket.watch that creates content for kids and family YouTube creators, resulting in more than 300 hours of programming produced to date. Currently, Hecht is overseeing the production of a series of 50 animated and live-action series and 5 specials, such as Toys and Colors and Dan Rhodes. Additionally, he directed and produced Ryan's World the Movie: Titan Universe Adventure, the first feature film for the YouTube star Ryan, which was released in fall 2024.

In his role as creator and executive producer at pocket.watch, Hecht created and produced Love, Diana with over 1 billion views and Onyx Family Dinner, which was nominated for a MIPCOM CANNES Diversify TV Award for its contributions to representation in Kids Programming.

== Films ==
In movies, Hecht produced films for Paramount including Lemony Snicket's A Series of Unfortunate Events. The SpongeBob SquarePants Movie, The Rugrats Movie and the Oscar-nominated animated feature Jimmy Neutron: Boy Genius. The Rugrats Movie was the first non-Disney animated feature to hit $100 million at the US domestic box office.

== Non-profit media ==
In 2005, Hecht co-founded the nonprofit media company Shine Global with his wife Susan MacLaury, Through Shine, Hecht produced the Oscar winning short documentary Inocente, and the Emmy and Oscar nominated documentary feature War/Dance.
