= Shine Global =

Shine Global Inc, is a non-profit media company that was founded in 2005 by Susan MacLaury, and Albie Hecht. Susan MacLaury is the Executive Director of Shine Global. Shine Global has produced projects including War/Dance, a 2008 Academy Award Nominee for Best Documentary and Inocente, the Academy Award Winner for Best Documentary Short Subject in 2013. In 2024, they produced Anuja, a Oscar shortlisted film in short live action category.

== History ==
Shine Global Inc. was founded in 2005 by husband and wife Albie Hecht and Susan MacLaury after learning about the plight faced by thousands of children in the war zone of northern Uganda. Shine Global’s mission is to give voice to children and their families by telling stories of their resilience to raise awareness, promote action, and inspire change.

== Films ==
=== War/Dance (2007) ===
Shine Global’s first film War/Dance tells the story of three northern Ugandan children who grew up in the war zone. It debuted at the 2007 Sundance Film Festival where it won the Documentary Directing Award and went on to be nominated for an Academy Award for Best Feature Documentary in 2008.

War/Dance was produced in partnership with Fine Film Productions, Rogues Harbor Studios, and distributed by ThinkFilm and Image Entertainment.

=== War/Dance Returns (2009) ===
War/Dance Returns is the 15-minute follow-up documentary to War/Dance. It depicts the journey back to the Patongo camp by the director of War/Dance, Sean Fine, Shine Global’s Executive Director, Susan Maclaury, and the original War/Dance film crew in the summer of 2008. Approximately 7-10 thousand people came to see the film in the Patongo camp making a lasting impression on the entire crew as well as Rose, Nancy, and Dominic. War/Dance Returns premiered on the Sundance Channel in May 2009.

=== The Harvest (La Cosecha) (2010) ===
Shine Global's second feature-length documentary, The Harvest (La Cosecha), directed by U. Roberto Romano, revisits Edward R. Murrow’s Harvest of Shame, filmed 40 years ago, and reveals that little has changed over the past 4 decades in the lives of migrant farm workers in America. Zulema, Perla and Victor labor as migrant farm workers, sacrificing their own childhoods to help their families survive. The Harvest profiles these three as they journey from the scorching heat of Texas’ onion fields to the winter snows of the Michigan apple orchards and back south to the humidity of Florida’s tomato fields to follow the harvest. In 2009, Eva Longoria signed on as an Executive Producer of the project. The Harvest premiered at the IDFA festival in Amsterdam in November 2010 and had its theatrical run in NY and LA in August 2011.

=== Inocente (2012) ===
Inocente is a 2012 short documentary film directed by Sean Fine and Andrea Nix. The film received the 2013 Academy Award for Best Documentary (Short Subject). The film is a coming-of-age story of a 15-year old girl in California. It was partially financed by the crowd funding website Kickstarter and was the first crowd funded film to win an Oscar. Inocente was broadcast on MTV in August 2012 and released along with all the other 5 Oscar-nominated short films in theaters by ShortsHD. The film is also available for communities and schools along with companion arts workshops developed by Shine Global and partners.

=== Dancing in Jaffa (2013) ===
Dancing in Jaffa is a 2013 documentary film directed by Hilla Medalia and produced in association with Shine Global. The film follows renowned ballroom dancer Pierre Dulaine as he returns home to Jaffa, Israel to teach Jewish and Palestinian-Israeli children to ballroom dance with each other. It won numerous festival awards and screened theatrically in the US in 2013.

=== 1 Way Up in 3D (2014) ===
1 Way Up is a 2014 documentary film directed by first time director Amy Mathieson. Filmed in 3D, it follows Quillan Isidore and Tre Whyte, two teen boys on the road to the UCI BMX World Championships. The film features a soundtrack of spoken-word and rap vignettes from musicians including the single "1 Way Up" from UK rap artist Phreeda Sharp.

1 Way Up premiered theatrically in London in 3D in July 2014 and was broadcast on MTV UK in August 2014. It aired on Pivot (TV network) in the US in December 2014.

=== The Wrong Light (2016) ===
The Wrong Light is a documentary film directed by Josie Swantek Heitz and Dave Adams and produced in association with Shine Global. The film explores the exploitation and misrepresentation of young girls in Thailand. The film follows a charismatic activist who leads a globally-regarded NGO that provides shelter and education for girls rescued from brothels in Northern Thailand. But as the filmmakers meet the girls and their families, discrepancies begin to emerge and the story takes an unexpected turn.

The Wrong Light has won numerous festival awards. It was the winner grand prize NJ Films Section Montclair Film Festival, official Selection 40th Cleveland international Film Festival, official selection 40th Atlanta Film Festival and the official Selection Louisiana International Film Festival.

=== Liyana (2017) ===
Liyana is a documentary film directed by Aaron and Amanda Kopp and produced in association with Shine Global. In this documentary/animated film, a group of orphaned children in Swaziland collaborate to write an original African tale about Liyana, a girl on a dangerous quest. Inspired by the children’s darkest memories and brightest dreams, their fictional character’s journey reveals parallels between her fate and that of the young storytellers.

After premiering at the 2017 LA Film Festival, the film was released in the United States on October 10, 2018. It received highly positive reviews and won the award for Best Documentary Feature at the 2017 LAFF, as well as numerous other festival awards.

=== Tre Maison Dasan (2018) ===
Tre Maison Dasan is a documentary film directed Denali Tiller and produced in association with Shine Global. In this documentary, Tre Maison Dasan is a story that explores parental incarceration through the eyes of three boys. Following their interweaving trajectories through boyhood marked by the criminal justice system, and told directly through the child's perspective, the film unveils the challenges of growing up and what it means to become a man in America. Tre, Maison and Dasan’s lives are stories of growing up, struggle, loss, empathy, positivity, resilience and unconditional love.

Tre Maison Dasan has received high number of positive reviews and awards. It was given the 'best Documentary Feature at Raindance International Film Festival'. The Karen Schmeer Award for Best Editing at IFF Boston. The Youth Jury Award for Best Documentary Feature Rhode Island International Film Festival. Best Documentary Directing Olympia International Film Festival and was a Heartland Film Festival Finalist.

=== Virtually Free (2020) ===
Virtually Free is a documentary directed by André Robert Lee and produced in association with Shine Global. Virtually Free is a documentary about unlikely allies who partner to transform the juvenile justice system and stop mass incarceration. In the film, Sid, Taee, and AR, three teens currently being held in a Richmond, VA detention center who are offered the chance to become activists speaking truth to power.

Participating in a local arts organization program, Performing Statistics, they are taught by different artists to deliver their powerful, authentic messages to the public, law enforcement, and government officials using their art, including a virtual reality jail cell they’ve helped create.

=== Through our eyes: Homefront (2021) ===
Through our eyes: Homefront is a documentary directed by Kristi Jacobson. It is a Sesame Workshop production, in association with Shine Global.

It is part of the Sesame Workshop documentary series Through Our Eyes that premiered on HBOMax. Homefront is about three children of veteran families coping with the emotional impact of having a parent wounded from military service.

Gabby, Terry, and Luther all have parents who were injured while serving, and each family has found a way to heal the wounds of war. Homefront shows how Gabby (9), a fierce animal lover with a stock of chickens, rabbits, bees, and dogs, loves her family and faces her fears about her Dad’s traumatic brain injury and PTSD via equine therapy. Terry (10), an enthusiastic boy and his parents, Taniki and Brandon, share their experiences and mental health struggles as they work to heal and help each other cope with depression and PTSD through honest conversation and embracing joy. Luther (9) is a charismatic boy who wants to be “like my dad when I grow up.” His father, Joe, a Navy veteran who lost his leg in an IED explosion, struggles through chronic pain to put family first.

== Digital Series ==
The Election Effect (2018) was produced by Shine Global and in association with Paramount Network. The Election Effect is a series of five short documentaries, each by a different director, that showcase seven different teenagers in five states across the country. Each documentary focuses on a different issue or aspect of life in the wake of the 2016 US presidential election and how that election encouraged political engagement.

The Difference (2018) was directed by Becca Roth and produced in association with Shine Global. The Difference is a short documentary series about children whose lives have changed because of their relationship with a mentor.

== Outreach and Engagement ==
Since their founding in 2005, Shine Global has partnered with several organizations on outreach and engagement for their films. Shine Global partnered with AMREF during the production of War/Dance to aid the people of Uganda. Shine Global also partnered with The Harvest of Hope Foundation, a migrant farm workers organization based out of Florida that works to support migrant farm workers. Shine Global creates curricula for most of its films that are free for teachers to download from their website. Shine Global has also partnered with other non-profits to create companion arts workshops for youth that can accompany screenings of Inocente and 1 Way Up.
