= 85th Academy Awards =

- Official poster
- Date: February 24, 2013
- Site: Dolby Theatre; Hollywood, Los Angeles, United States
- Hosted by: Seth MacFarlane
- Preshow hosts: Jess Cagle; Kristin Chenoweth; Kelly Rowland; Robin Roberts; Lara Spencer
- Produced by: Neil Meron; Craig Zadan
- Directed by: Don Mischer

Highlights
- Best Picture: Argo
- Most awards: Life of Pi (4)
- Most nominations: Lincoln (12)

TV in the United States
- Network: ABC
- Duration: 3 hours, 35 minutes
- Ratings: 40.38 million 24.47% (Nielsen ratings)

The 85th Academy Awards ceremony, presented by the Academy of Motion Picture Arts and Sciences (AMPAS), honored the best films of 2012 and took place on February 24, 2013, at the Dolby Theatre in Hollywood, Los Angeles, beginning at 5:30 p.m. Pacific Time Zone (PST) / 8:30 p.m. Eastern Time Zone (EST). The ceremony was the first in the Academy's 85-year history to adopt the phrase "The Oscars" as the ceremony's official name during the broadcast and marketing. During the ceremony, the Academy of Motion Picture Arts and Sciences presented Academy Awards (commonly referred to as Oscars) in 24 categories. The ceremony was televised in the United States by ABC, and produced by Craig Zadan and Neil Meron and directed by Don Mischer. Actor Seth MacFarlane hosted the show for the first time.

In related events, the Academy held its 4th annual Governors Awards ceremony at the Grand Ballroom of the Hollywood and Highland Center on December 1, 2012. On February 9, 2013, in a ceremony at The Beverly Hills Hotel in Beverly Hills, California, the Academy Awards for Technical Achievement were presented by hosts Chris Pine and Zoe Saldaña.

Argo won three awards, including Best Picture, the first film to win an Academy Award for Best Picture without its director nominated since Driving Miss Daisy. Other winners included Life of Pi with four awards, Les Misérables with three, Django Unchained, Lincoln, and Skyfall with two, and Amour, Anna Karenina, Brave, Curfew, Inocente, Paperman, Searching for Sugar Man, Silver Linings Playbook and Zero Dark Thirty with one. The telecast garnered more than 40 million viewers in the United States.

== Winners and nominees ==
The nominees for the 85th Academy Awards were announced on January 10, 2013, at 5:38 a.m. PST (13:38 UTC) at the Samuel Goldwyn Theater in Beverly Hills, California, by Seth MacFarlane, host of the ceremony, and actress Emma Stone. Lincoln received the most nominations with twelve total, and Life of Pi came in second with eleven.

The winners were announced during the awards ceremony on February 24, 2013. Argo was the fourth film to win Best Picture without a directing nomination, following 1927's Wings, 1932's Grand Hotel, and 1989's Driving Miss Daisy. As co-producer of Argo, George Clooney became the third individual to win Oscars for both acting and producing. By virtue of his nomination for Best Original Song in Ted, host MacFarlane became the sixth person since James Franco, who was a co-host and a Best Actor nominee during the 83rd ceremony in 2011, to host the ceremony while receiving a nomination in the same year. Silver Linings Playbook was the fourteenth film to earn nominations in all four acting categories, and the first since Reds in 1981. At age 22, Best Actress winner Jennifer Lawrence became the second-youngest winner in that category. With his third win for Best Lead Actor, Daniel Day-Lewis became the first three-time winner in that category. He also was the sixth performer to win at least three acting Oscars. Amour was the fourth film nominated simultaneously for Best Picture and Best Foreign Language Film in the same year. At age nine, Quvenzhané Wallis became the youngest nominee for Best Actress and the youngest female acting nominee overall. Meanwhile, Emmanuelle Riva (aged 85) was the oldest nominee for Best Actress. This marked the first time in Oscar history that all five nominees in an acting category (Best Supporting Actor) were all previous winners. Skyfall and Zero Dark Thirty's joint win in the Best Sound Editing category was the sixth occurrence of a tie in Oscar history. Skyfall won the award for Best Original Song, becoming the first Bond song to win the award.

=== Awards ===
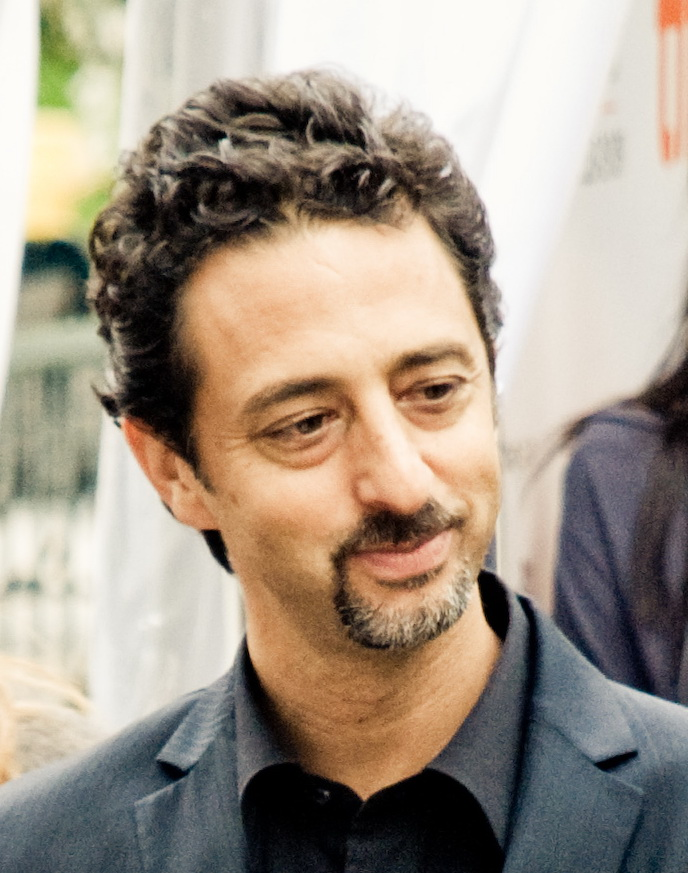
Grant Heslov, Best Picture co-winner

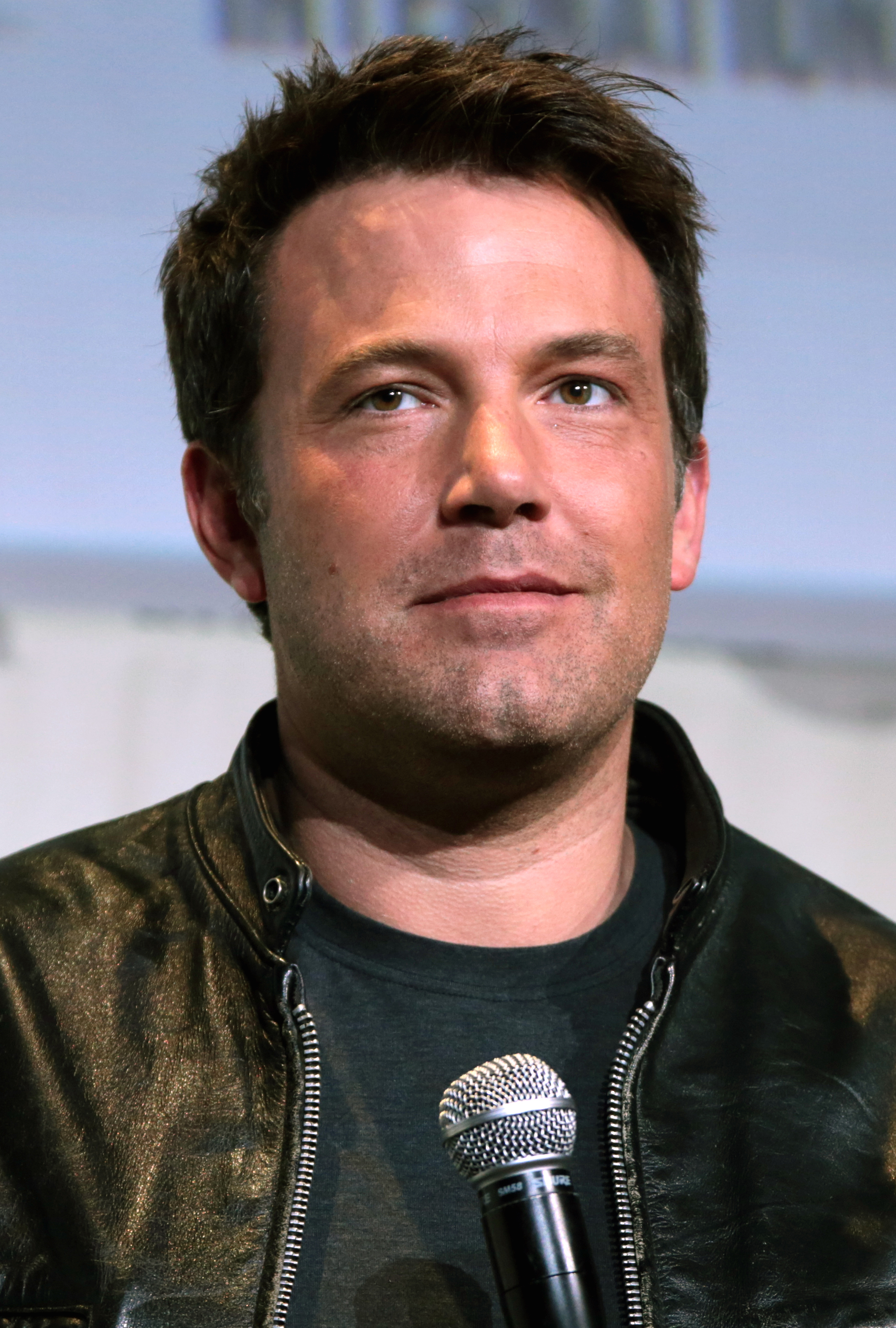
Ben Affleck, Best Picture co-winner

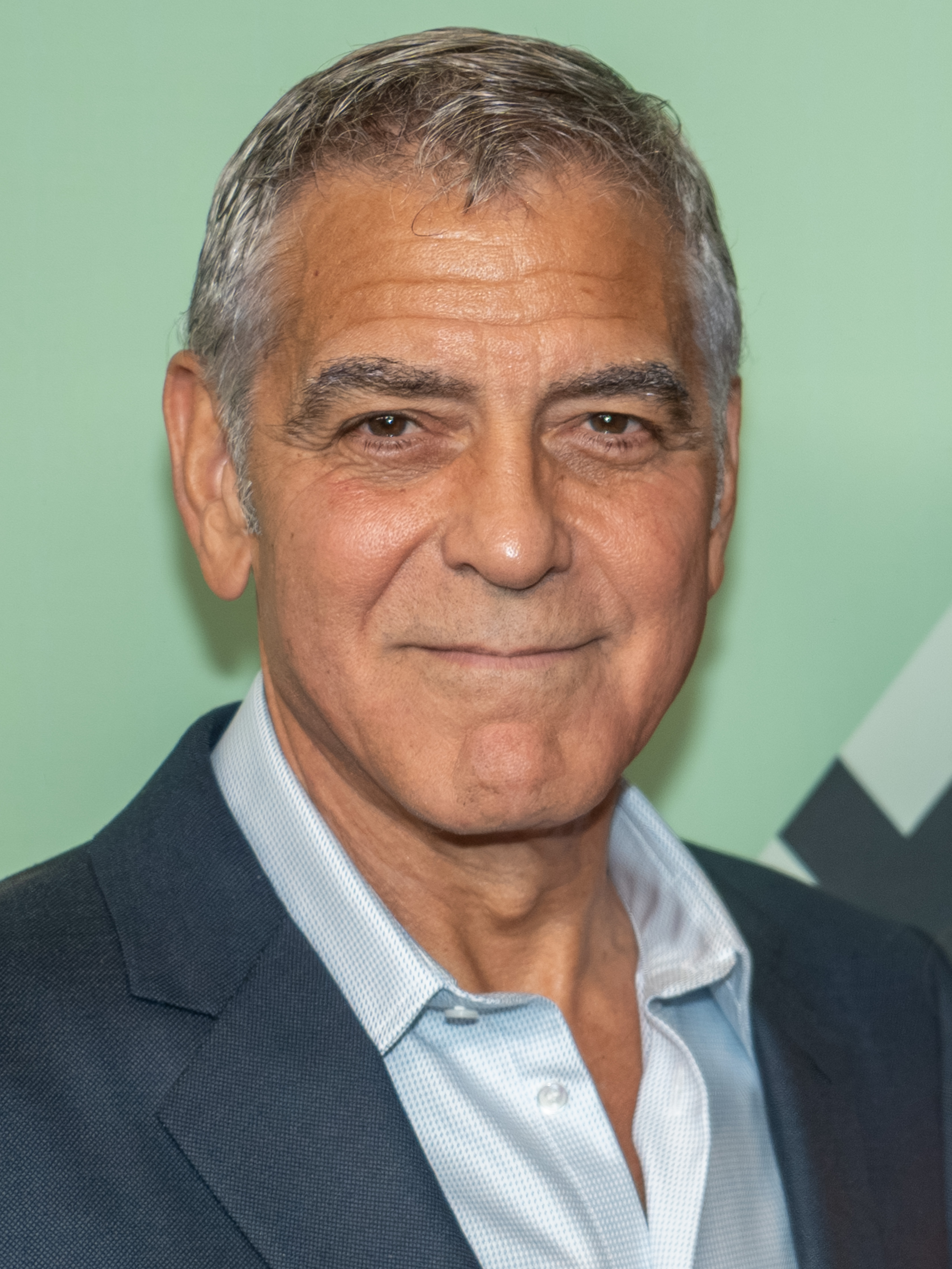
George Clooney, Best Picture co-winner

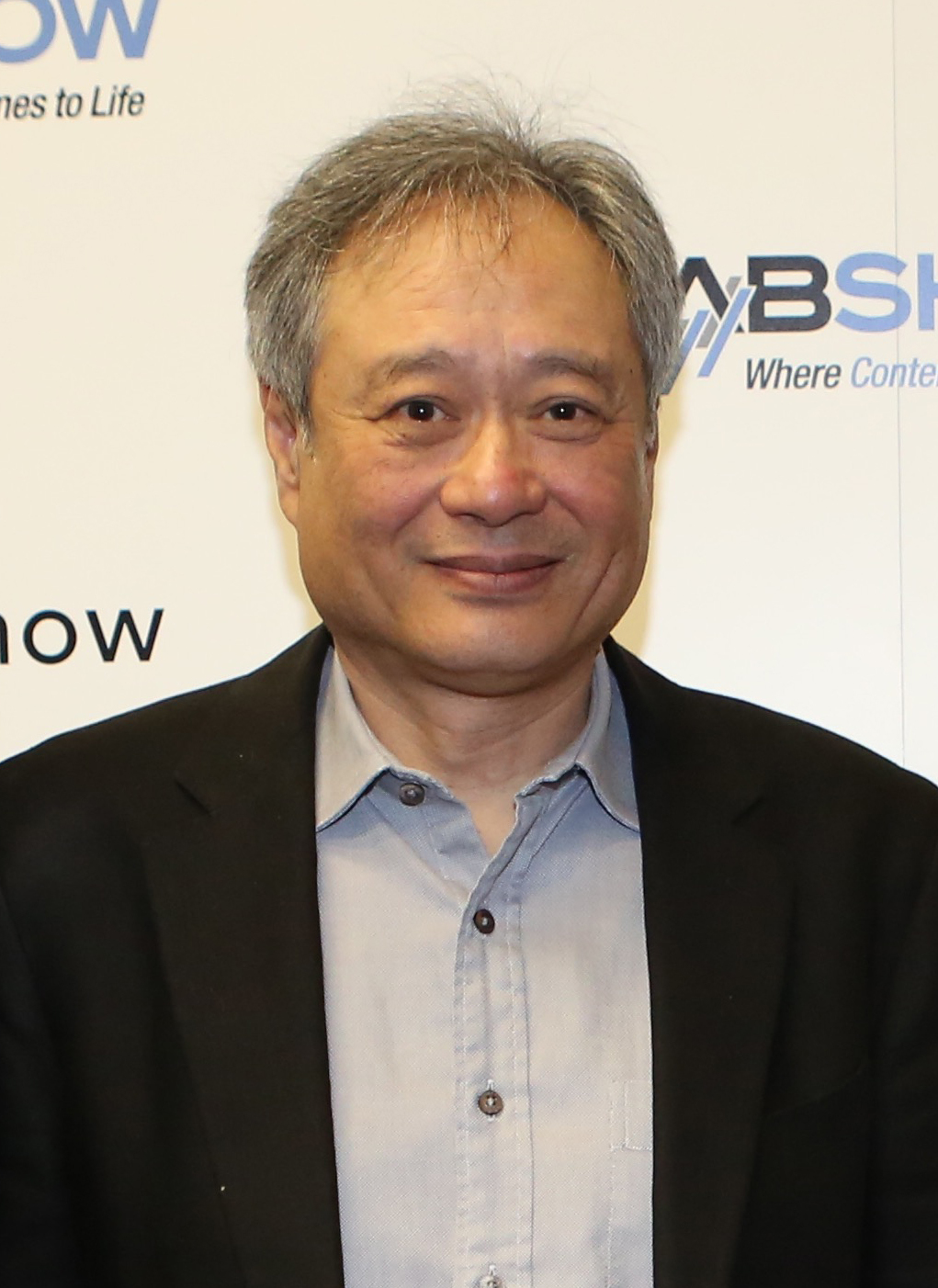
Ang Lee, Best Director winner

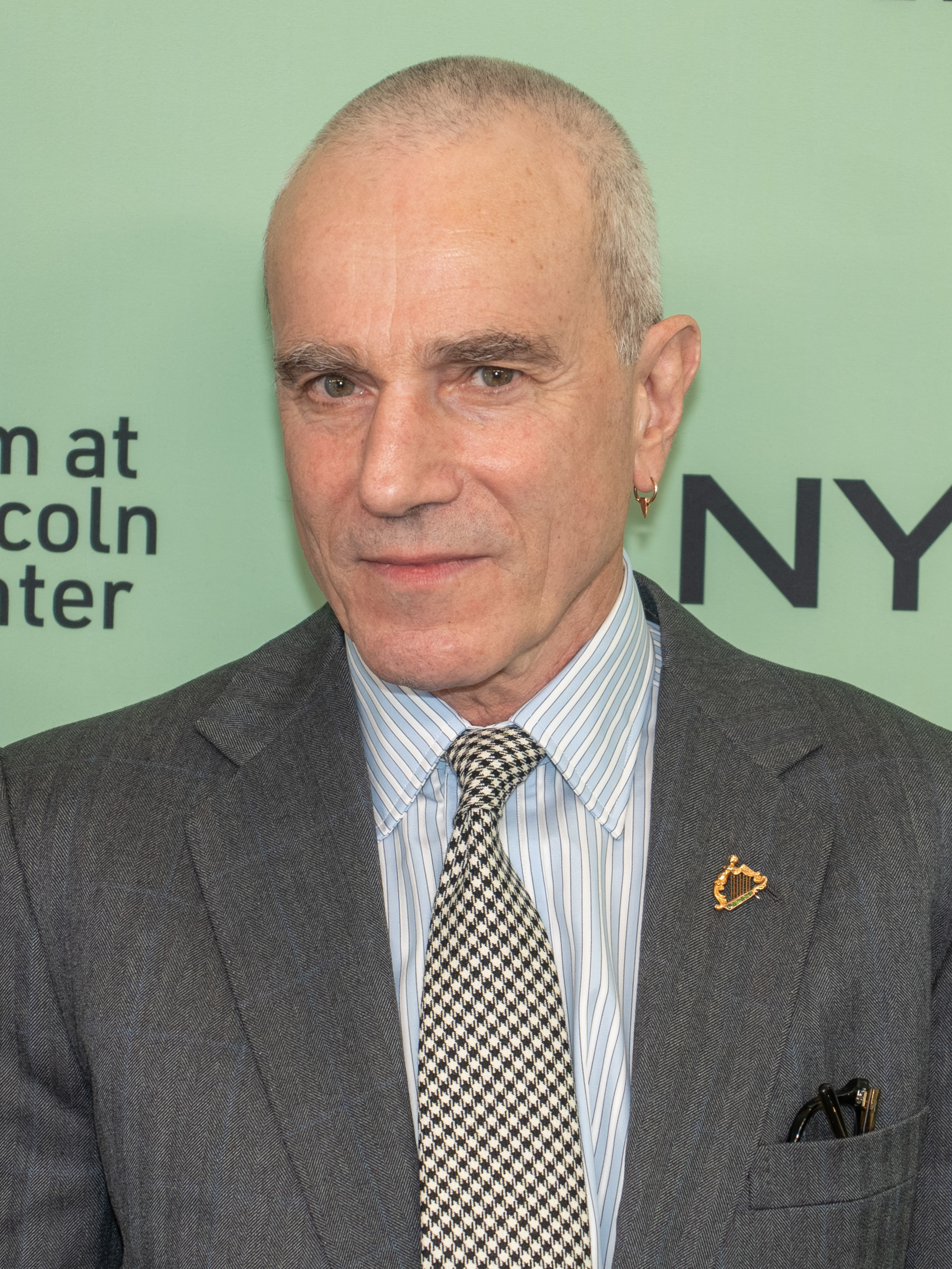
Daniel Day-Lewis, Best Actor winner

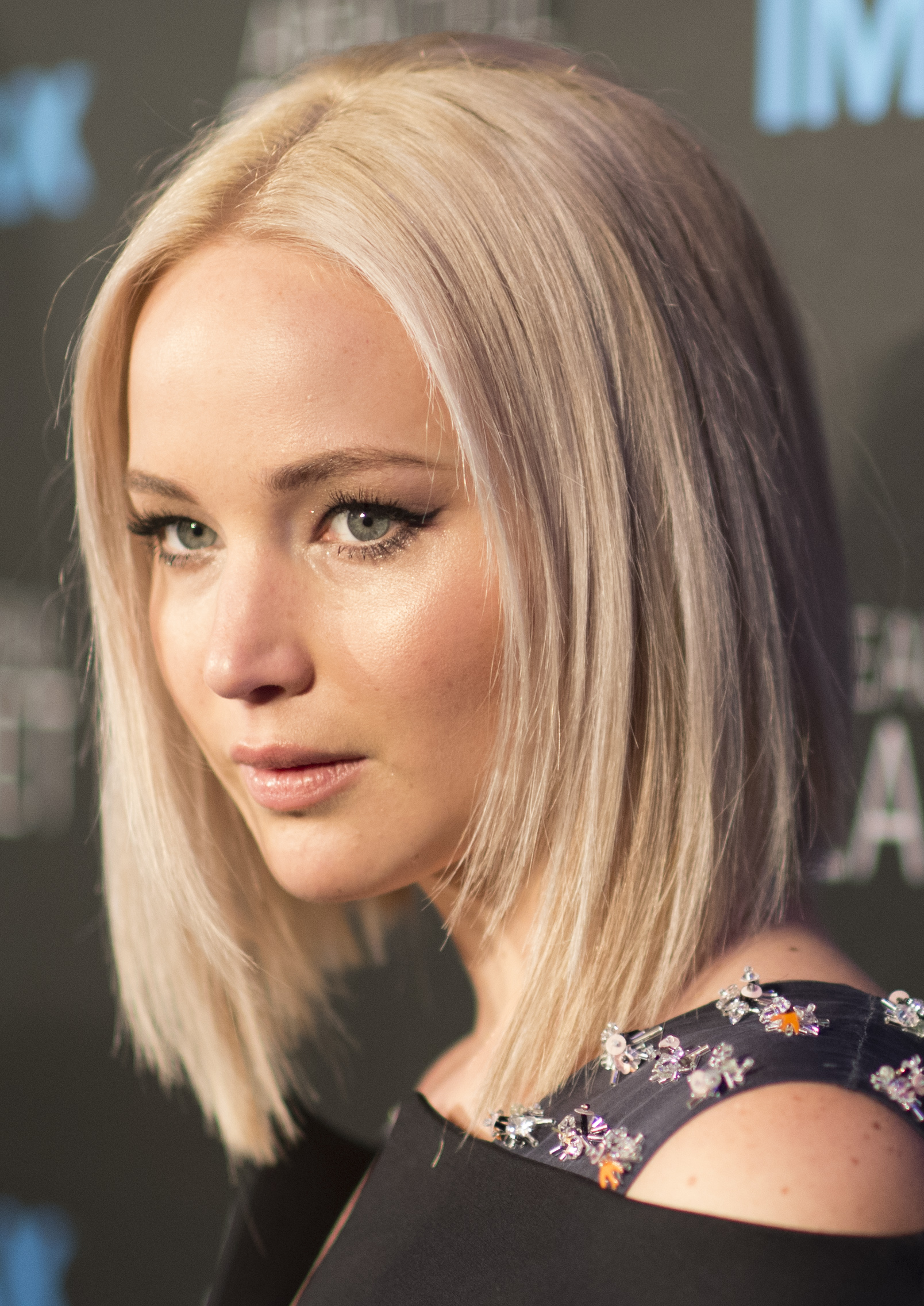
Jennifer Lawrence, Best Actress winner

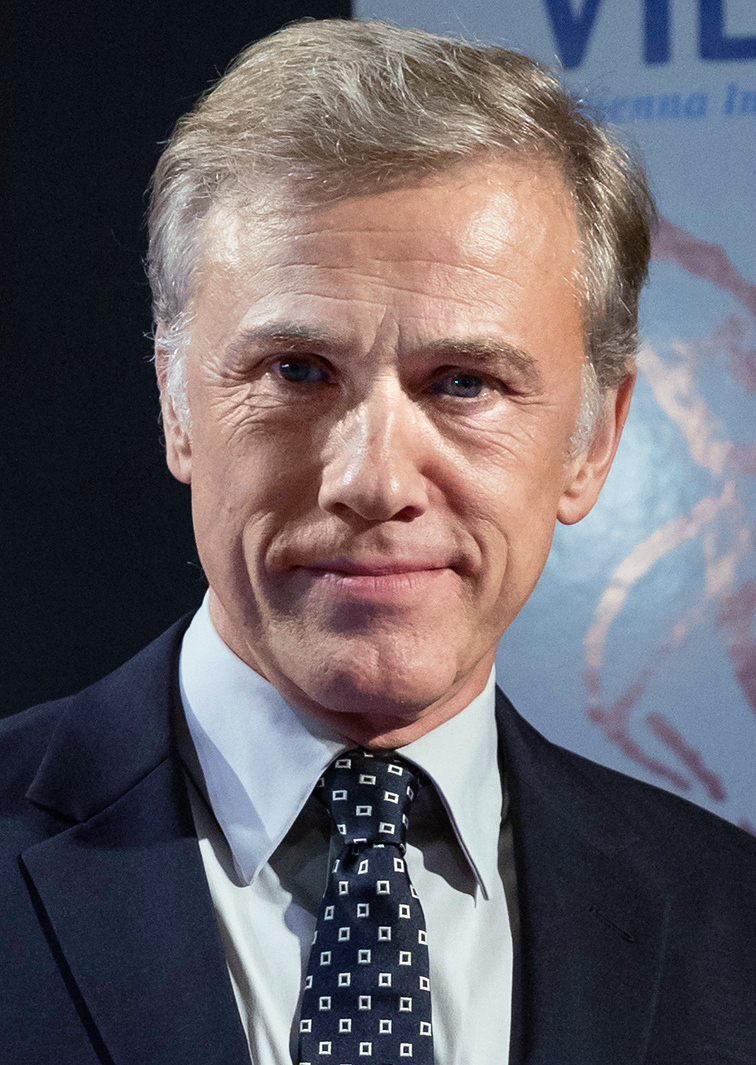
Christoph Waltz, Best Supporting Actor winner

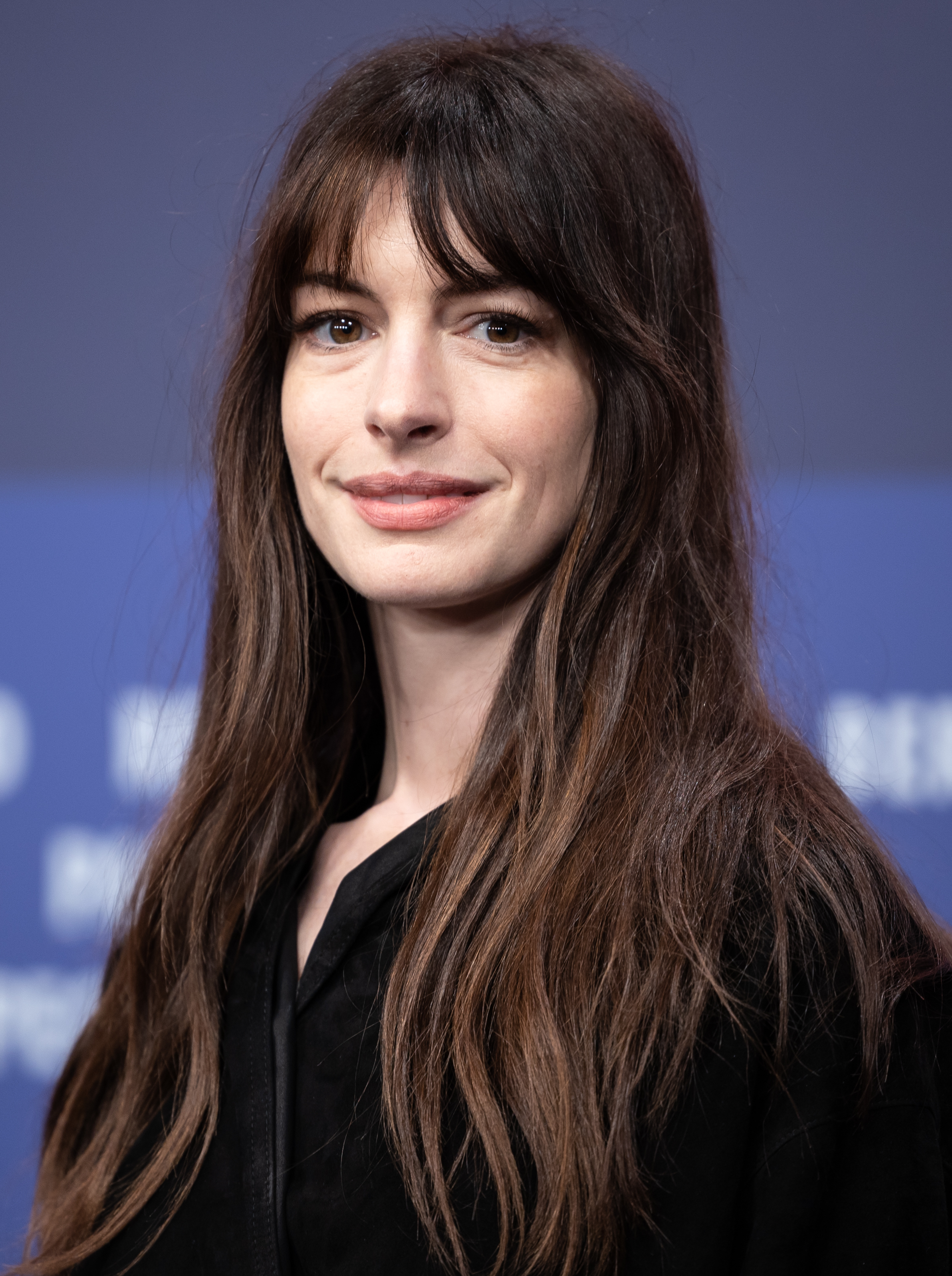
Anne Hathaway, Best Supporting Actress winner

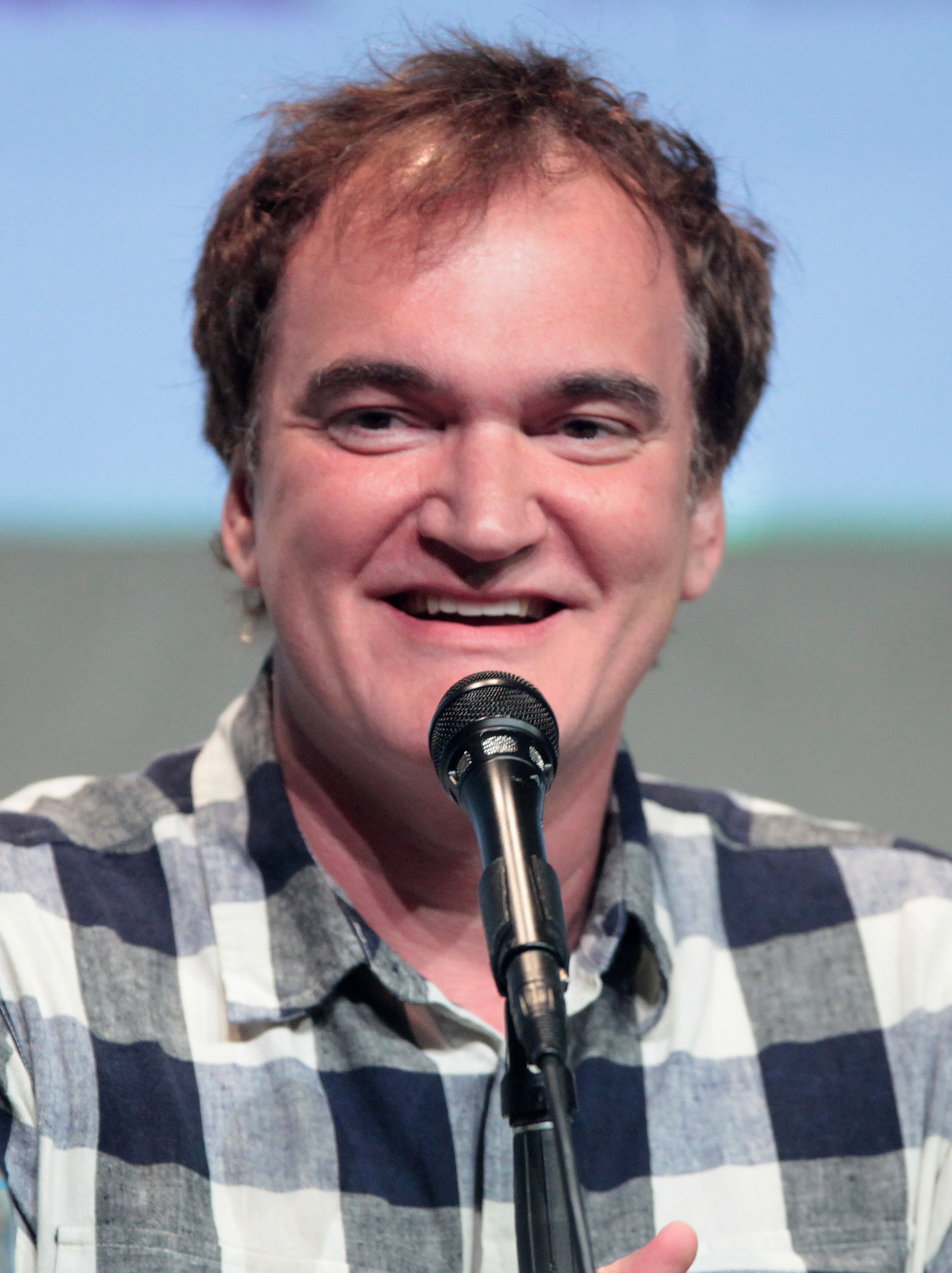
Quentin Tarantino, Best Original Screenplay winner

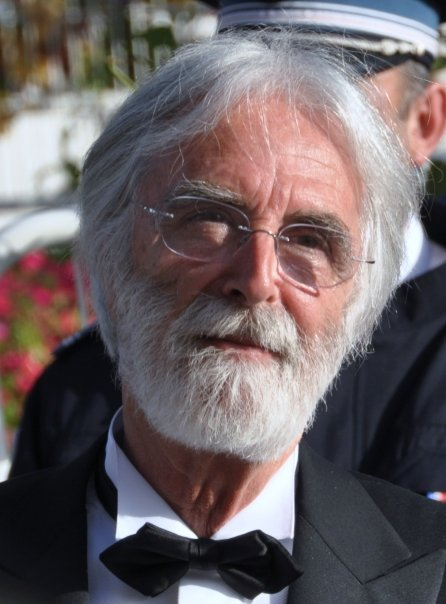
Michael Haneke, Best Foreign Language Film winner

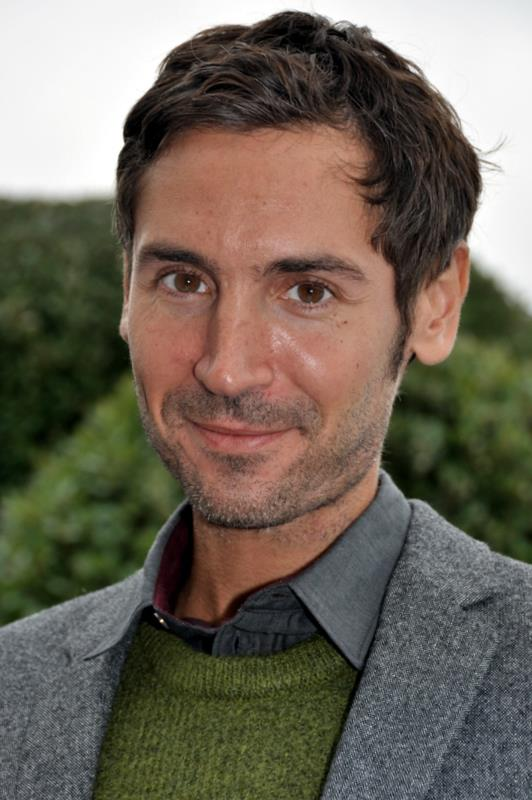
Malik Bendjelloul, Best Documentary Feature co-winner

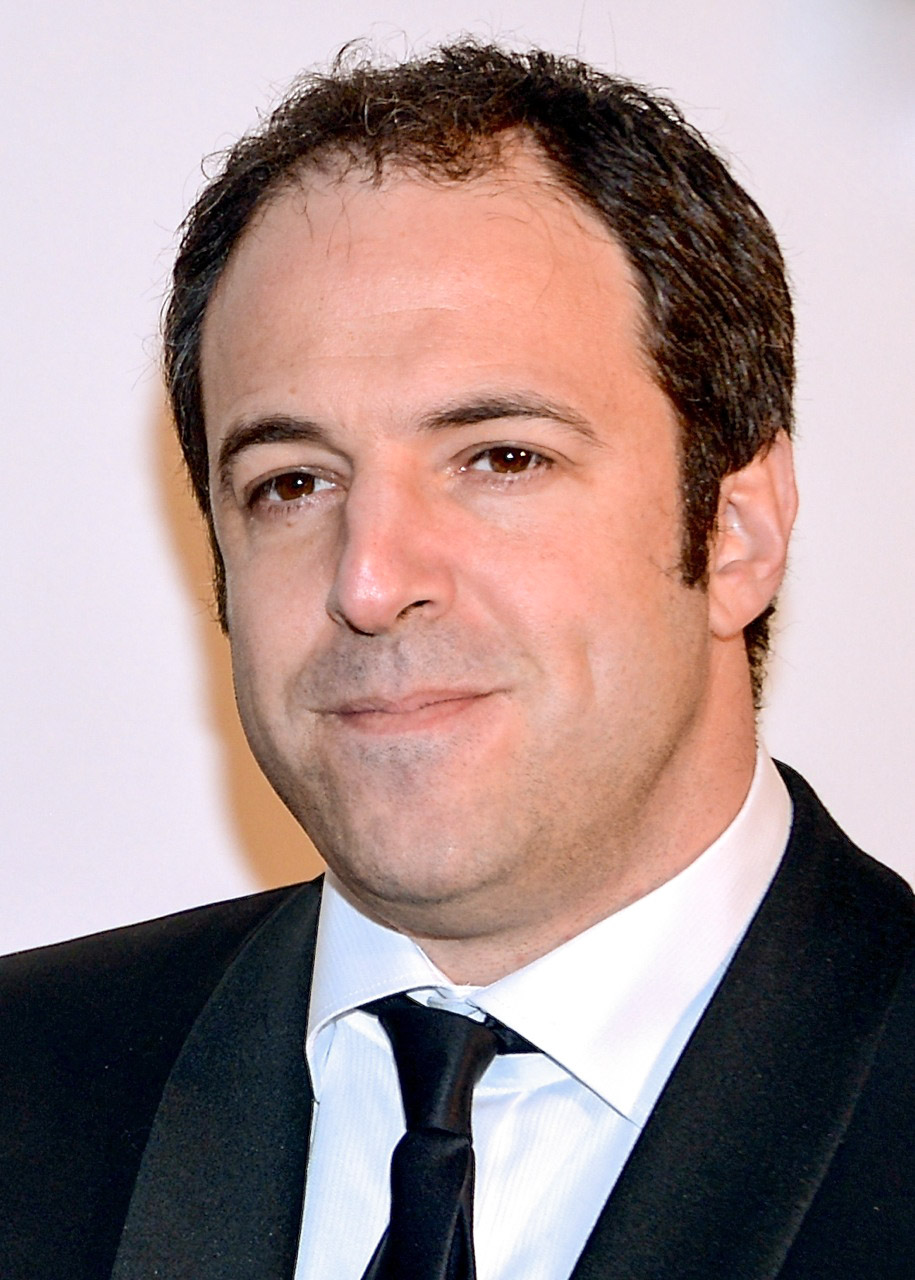
Simon Chinn, Best Documentary Feature co-winner

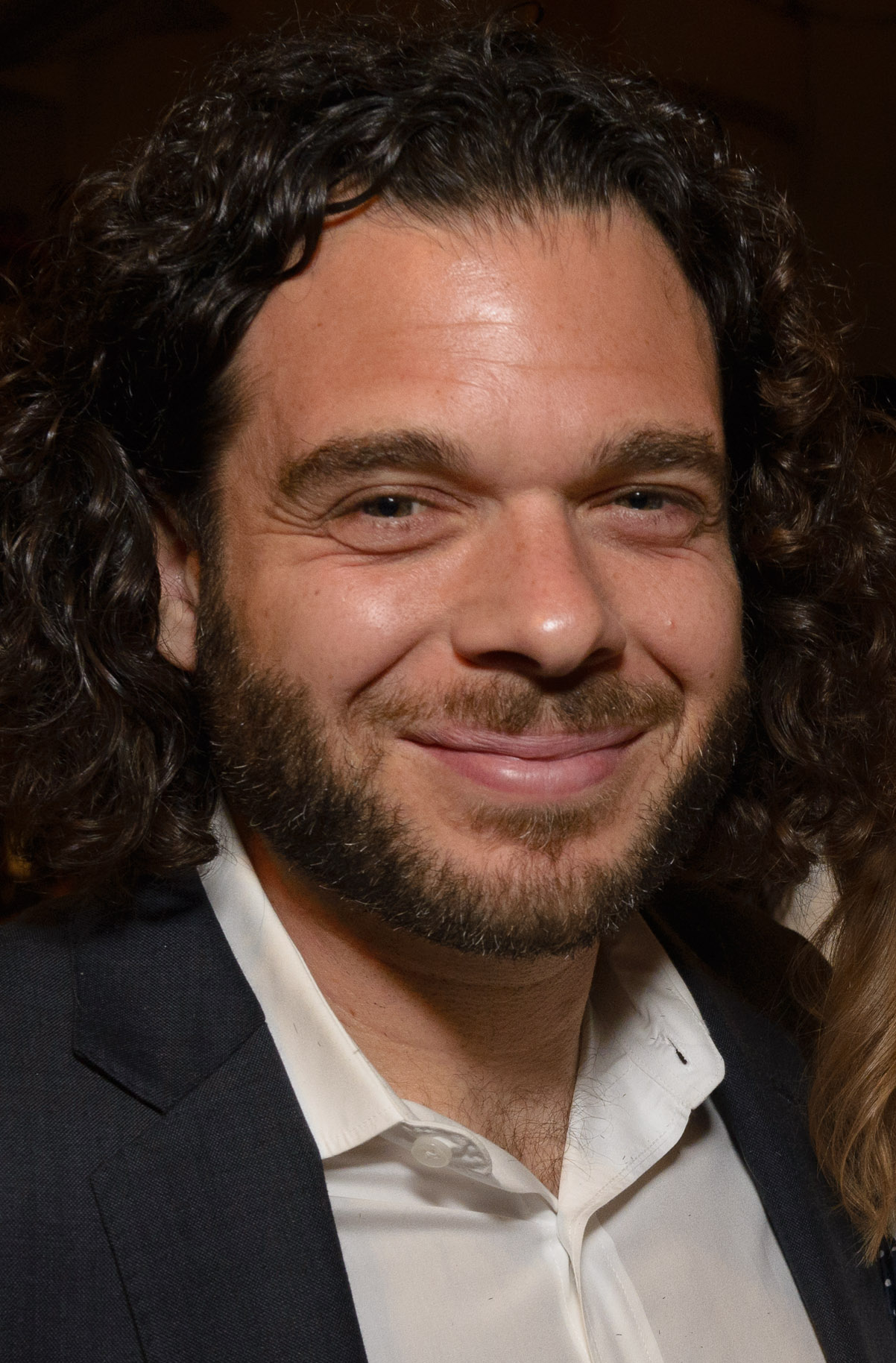
Sean Fine, Best Documentary Short Subject co-winner

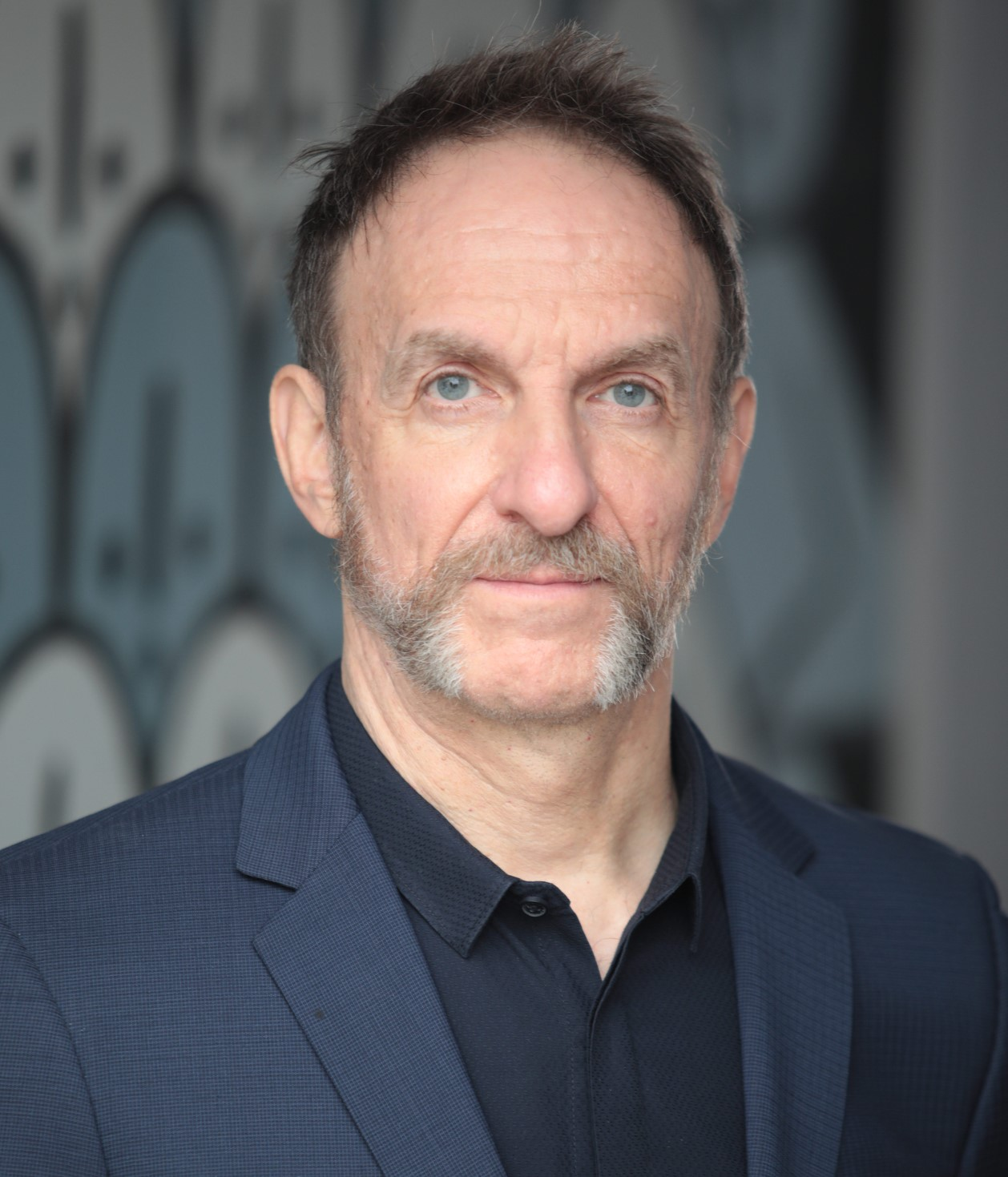
Mychael Danna, Best Original Score winner

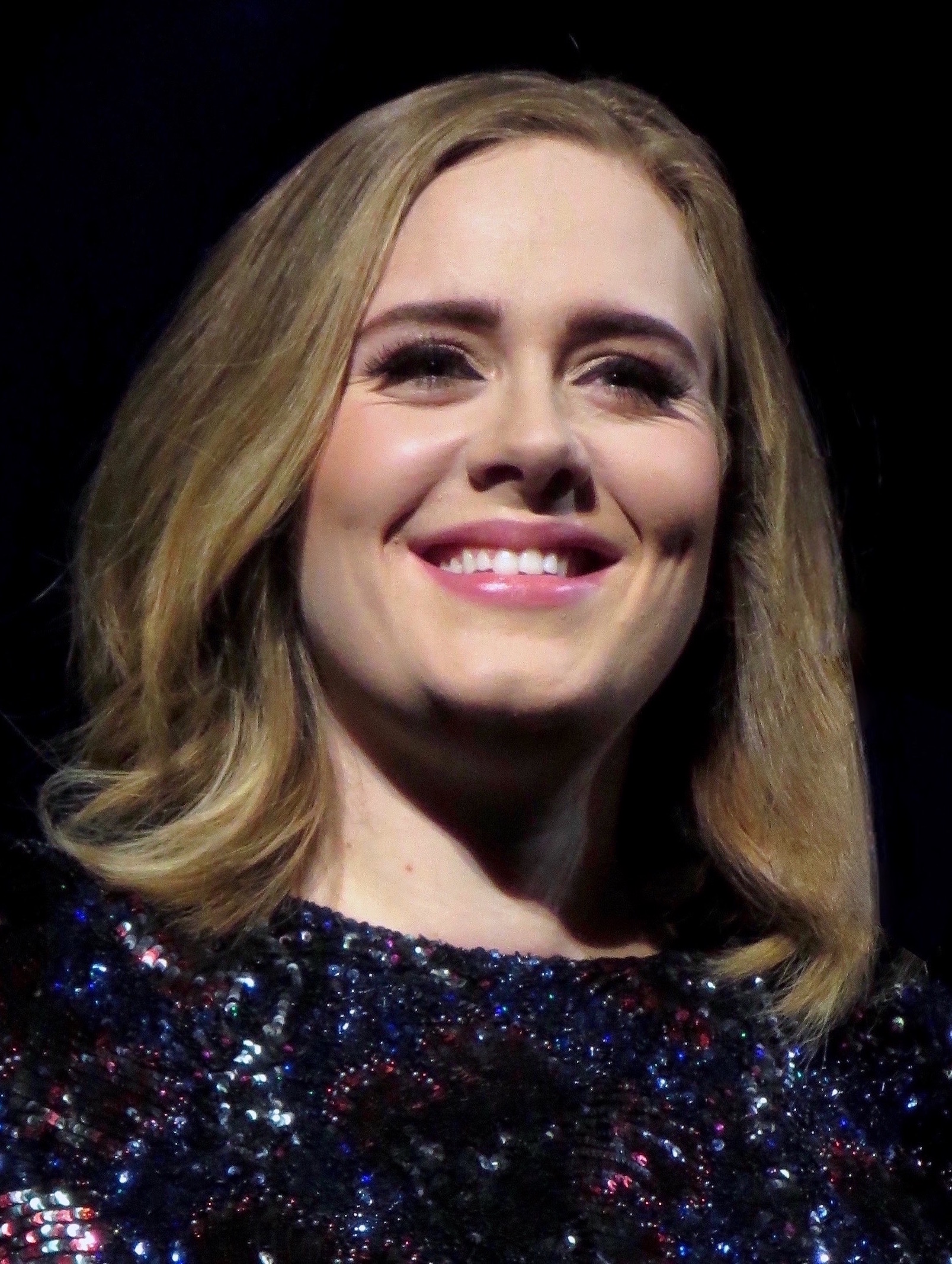
Adele, Best Original Song co-winner

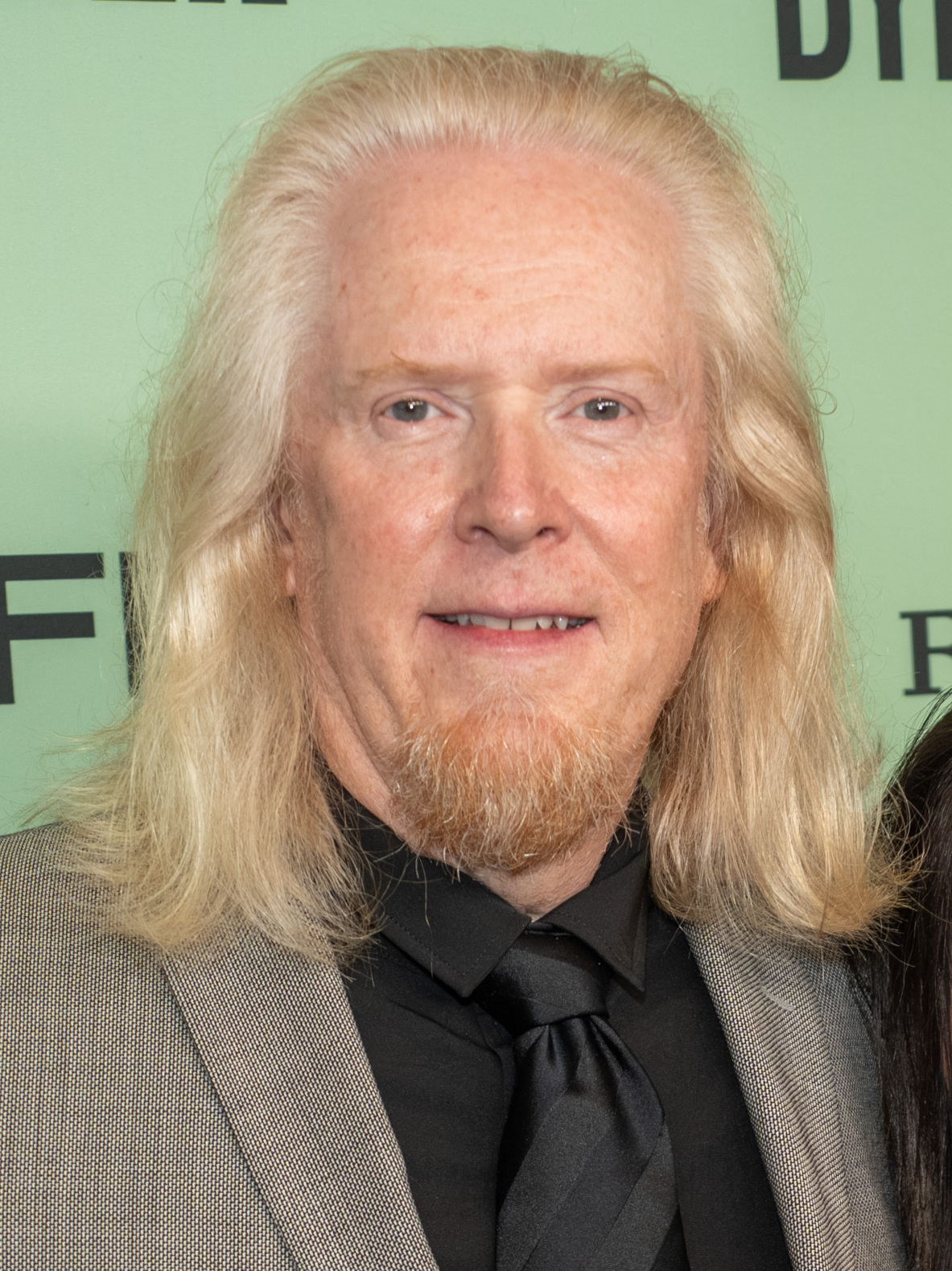
Paul N. J. Ottosson, Best Sound Editing winner

Winners are listed first, highlighted in boldface, and indicated with a double dagger (‡).

**Best Picture**: **Argo – Grant Heslov, Ben Affleck and George Clooney, producers**‡; Amour – Margaret Ménégoz, Stefan Arndt, Veit Heiduschka and Michael Katz, producers; Beasts of the Southern Wild – Dan Janvey, Josh Penn and Michael Gottwald, producers; Django Unchained – Stacey Sher, Reginald Hudlin and Pilar Savone, producers; Les Misérables – Tim Bevan, Eric Fellner, Debra Hayward and Cameron Mackintosh, producers; Life of Pi – Gil Netter, Ang Lee and David Womark, producers; Lincoln – Steven Spielberg and Kathleen Kennedy, producers; Silver Linings Playbook – Donna Gigliotti, Bruce Cohen and Jonathan Gordon, producers; Zero Dark Thirty – Mark Boal, Kathryn Bigelow and Megan Ellison, producers	**Best Directing**: **Ang Lee – Life of Pi**‡; Michael Haneke – Amour; Benh Zeitlin – Beasts of the Southern Wild; Steven Spielberg – Lincoln; David O. Russell – Silver Linings Playbook
**Best Actor in a Leading Role**: **Daniel Day-Lewis – Lincoln as Abraham Lincoln**‡; Bradley Cooper – Silver Linings Playbook as Patrizio "Pat" Solitano Jr.; Hugh Jackman – Les Misérables as Jean Valjean; Joaquin Phoenix – The Master as Freddie Quell; Denzel Washington – Flight as William "Whip" Whitaker Sr.	**Best Actress in a Leading Role**: **Jennifer Lawrence – Silver Linings Playbook as Tiffany Maxwell**‡; Jessica Chastain – Zero Dark Thirty as Maya Harris; Emmanuelle Riva – Amour as Anne Laurent; Quvenzhané Wallis – Beasts of the Southern Wild as Hushpuppy; Naomi Watts – The Impossible as Maria Bennett
**Best Actor in a Supporting Role**: **Christoph Waltz – Django Unchained as Dr. King Schultz**‡; Alan Arkin – Argo as Lester Siegel; Robert De Niro – Silver Linings Playbook as Patrizio "Pat" Solitano Sr.; Philip Seymour Hoffman – The Master as Lancaster Dodd; Tommy Lee Jones – Lincoln as Thaddeus Stevens	**Best Actress in a Supporting Role**: **Anne Hathaway – Les Misérables as Fantine**‡; Amy Adams – The Master as Peggy Dodd; Sally Field – Lincoln as Mary Todd Lincoln; Helen Hunt – The Sessions as Cheryl Cohen-Greene; Jacki Weaver – Silver Linings Playbook as Dolores Solitano
**Best Writing (Original Screenplay)**: **Django Unchained – Quentin Tarantino**‡; Amour – Michael Haneke; Flight – John Gatins; Moonrise Kingdom – Wes Anderson and Roman Coppola; Zero Dark Thirty – Mark Boal	**Best Writing (Adapted Screenplay)**: **Argo – Chris Terrio; based on a selection from The Master of Disguise by Antonio J. Mendez and the Wired magazine article The Great Escape by Joshuah Bearman**‡; Beasts of the Southern Wild – Lucy Alibar and Benh Zeitlin; based on the play Juicy and Delicious by Lucy Alibar; Life of Pi – David Magee; based on the novel by Yann Martel; Lincoln – Tony Kushner; based in part on the book Team of Rivals: The Political Genius of Abraham Lincoln by Doris Kearns Goodwin; Silver Linings Playbook – David O. Russell; based on the novel by Matthew Quick
**Best Animated Feature Film**: **Brave – Directed by Mark Andrews and Brenda Chapman**‡; Frankenweenie – Directed by Tim Burton; ParaNorman – Directed by Sam Fell and Chris Butler; The Pirates! Band of Misfits – Directed by Peter Lord; Wreck-It Ralph – Directed by Rich Moore	**Best Foreign Language Film**: **Amour (Austria) in French – Directed by Michael Haneke**‡; Kon-Tiki (Norway) in English and Norwegian – Directed by Joachim Rønning and Espen Sandberg; No (Chile) in Spanish – Directed by Pablo Larraín; A Royal Affair (Denmark) in Danish – Directed by Nikolaj Arcel; War Witch (Canada) in French – Directed by Kim Nguyen
**Best Documentary (Feature)**: **Searching for Sugar Man – Malik Bendjelloul and Simon Chinn**‡; 5 Broken Cameras – Emad Burnat and Guy Davidi; The Gatekeepers – Dror Moreh, Philippa Kowarsky and Estelle Fialon; How to Survive a Plague – David France and Howard Gertler; The Invisible War – Kirby Dick and Amy Ziering	**Best Documentary (Short Subject)**: **Inocente – Sean Fine and Andrea Nix Fine**‡; Kings Point – Sari Gilman and Jedd Wider; Mondays at Racine – Cynthia Wade and Robin Honan; Open Heart – Kief Davidson and Cori Shepherd Stern; Redemption – Jon Alpert and Matthew O'Neill
**Best Short Film (Live Action)**: **Curfew – Shawn Christensen**‡; Asad – Bryan Buckley and Mino Jarjoura; Buzkashi Boys – Sam French and Ariel Nasr; Death of a Shadow (Dood Van Een Schaduw) – Tom Van Avermaet and Ellen De Waele; Henry – Yan England	**Best Short Film (Animated)**: **Paperman – John Kahrs**‡; Adam and Dog – Minkyu Lee; Fresh Guacamole – PES; Head over Heels – Timothy Reckart and Fodhla Cronin O'Reilly; Maggie Simpson in "The Longest Daycare" – David Silverman
**Best Music (Original Score)**: **Life of Pi – Mychael Danna**‡; Anna Karenina – Dario Marianelli; Argo – Alexandre Desplat; Lincoln – John Williams; Skyfall – Thomas Newman	**Best Music (Original Song)**: **"Skyfall" from Skyfall – Music and lyrics by Adele Adkins and Paul Epworth**‡; "Before My Time" from Chasing Ice – Music and lyrics by J. Ralph; "Everybody Needs a Best Friend" from Ted – Music by Walter Murphy; lyrics by Seth MacFarlane; "Pi's Lullaby" from Life of Pi – Music by Mychael Danna; lyrics by Bombay Jayashri; "Suddenly" from Les Misérables – Music by Claude-Michel Schönberg; lyrics by Herbert Kretzmer and Alain Boublil
**Best Sound Editing**: **Skyfall – Per Hallberg and Karen Baker Landers**‡; **Zero Dark Thirty – Paul N. J. Ottosson**‡; Argo – Erik Aadahl and Ethan Van der Ryn; Django Unchained – Wylie Stateman; Life of Pi – Eugene Gearty and Philip Stockton	**Best Sound Mixing**: **Les Misérables – Andy Nelson, Mark Paterson and Simon Hayes**‡; Argo – John Reitz, Gregg Rudloff and José Antonio García; Life of Pi – Ron Bartlett, D.M. Hemphill and Drew Kunin; Lincoln – Andy Nelson, Gary Rydstrom and Ronald Judkins; Skyfall – Scott Millan, Greg P. Russell and Stuart Wilson
**Best Production Design**: **Lincoln – Production Design: Rick Carter; Set Decoration: Jim Erickson**‡; Anna Karenina – Production Design: Sarah Greenwood; Set Decoration: Katie Spencer; The Hobbit: An Unexpected Journey – Production Design: Dan Hennah; Set Decoration: Ra Vincent and Simon Bright; Les Misérables – Production Design: Eve Stewart; Set Decoration: Anna Lynch-Robinson; Life of Pi – Production Design: David Gropman; Set Decoration: Anna Pinnock	**Best Cinematography**: **Life of Pi – Claudio Miranda**‡; Anna Karenina – Seamus McGarvey; Django Unchained – Robert Richardson; Lincoln – Janusz Kamiński; Skyfall – Roger Deakins
**Best Makeup and Hairstyling**: **Les Misérables – Lisa Westcott and Julie Dartnell**‡; Hitchcock – Howard Berger, Peter Montagna and Martin Samuel; The Hobbit: An Unexpected Journey – Peter Swords King, Rick Findlater and Tami Lane	**Best Costume Design**: **Anna Karenina – Jacqueline Durran**‡; Les Misérables – Paco Delgado; Lincoln – Joanna Johnston; Mirror Mirror – Eiko Ishioka (posthumous nomination); Snow White and the Huntsman – Colleen Atwood
**Best Film Editing**: **Argo – William Goldenberg**‡; Life of Pi – Tim Squyres; Lincoln – Michael Kahn; Silver Linings Playbook – Jay Cassidy and Crispin Struthers; Zero Dark Thirty – Dylan Tichenor and William Goldenberg	**Best Visual Effects**: **Life of Pi – Bill Westenhofer, Guillaume Rocheron, Erik-Jan de Boer and Donald R. Elliott**‡; The Hobbit: An Unexpected Journey – Joe Letteri, Eric Saindon, David Clayton and R. Christopher White; Marvel's The Avengers – Janek Sirrs, Jeff White, Guy Williams and Dan Sudick; Prometheus – Richard Stammers, Trevor Wood, Charley Henley and Martin Hill; Snow White and the Huntsman – Cedric Nicolas-Troyan, Philip Brennan, Neil Corbould and Michael Dawson

=== Governors Awards ===
The Academy held its 4th Annual Governors Awards ceremony on December 1, 2012, during which the following awards were presented:

==== Honorary Awards ====
- To Hal Needham, an innovator, mentor, and master technician who elevated his craft to an art and made the impossible look easy.
- To D. A. Pennebaker, who redefined the language of film and taught a generation of filmmakers to look to reality for inspiration.
- To George Stevens Jr., a tireless champion of the arts in America and especially that most American of arts: the Hollywood film.

==== Jean Hersholt Humanitarian Award ====
- Jeffrey Katzenberg — who has led our community in enlightened philanthropy by his extraordinary example.

=== Films with multiple nominations and awards ===
The following 15 films received multiple nominations:

Nominations	Film
12	Lincoln
11	Life of Pi
8	Les Misérables
8	Silver Linings Playbook
7	Argo
5	Amour
5	Django Unchained
5	Skyfall
5	Zero Dark Thirty
4	Anna Karenina
4	Beasts of the Southern Wild
3	The Hobbit: An Unexpected Journey
3	The Master
2	Flight
2	Snow White and the Huntsman

The following six films received multiple awards:

Awards	Film
4	Life of Pi
3	Argo
3	Les Misérables
2	Django Unchained
2	Lincoln
2	Skyfall

== Presenters and performers ==
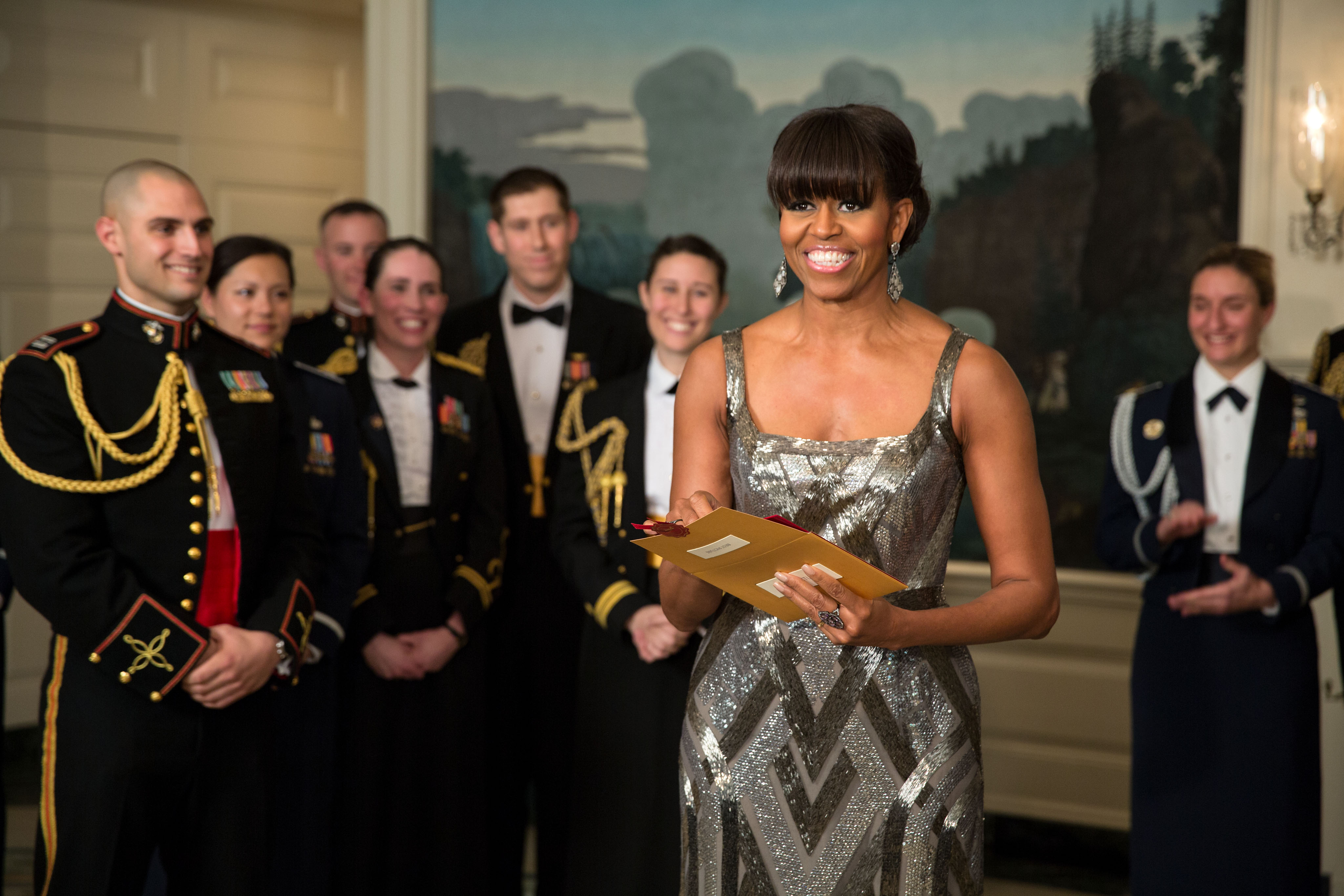
First Lady Michelle Obama announces Best Picture, awarded to Argo, live from the Diplomatic Room of the White House

The following individuals, listed in order of appearance, presented awards or performed musical numbers.

=== Presenters ===
Name(s)	Role
Cedering Fox	Announcer for the 85th annual Academy Awards
Octavia Spencer	Presenter of the award for Best Supporting Actor
Melissa McCarthy; Paul Rudd	Presenters of the awards for Best Animated Short Film and Best Animated Feature Film
Reese Witherspoon	Presenter of the films Les Misérables, Life of Pi and Beasts of the Southern Wild on the Best Picture segment
Robert Downey Jr. Chris Evans; Samuel L. Jackson; Jeremy Renner; Mark Ruffalo	Presenters of the awards for Best Cinematography and Best Visual Effects
Jennifer Aniston; Channing Tatum	Presenters of the awards for Best Costume Design and Best Makeup and Hairstyling
Halle Berry	Presenter of the "Fifty Years of Bond" tribute and performance of "Goldfinger"
Jamie Foxx; Kerry Washington	Presenters of the awards for Best Live Action Short Film and Best Documentary Short Subject
Liam Neeson	Presenter of the films Argo, Lincoln and Zero Dark Thirty on the Best Picture segment
Ben Affleck	Presenter of the award for Best Documentary Feature
Jessica Chastain; Jennifer Garner	Presenters of the award for Best Foreign Language Film
John Travolta	Presenter of "Celebration of Musicals of the Last Decade" musical number
Chris Pine; Zoe Saldaña	Presenters of the segment of the Academy Awards for Technical Achievement and the Gordon E. Sawyer Award
Mark Wahlberg; Ted (Seth MacFarlane)	Presenters of the awards for Best Sound Mixing and Best Sound Editing
Christopher Plummer	Presenter of the award for Best Supporting Actress
Hawk Koch (AMPAS president)	Special presentation acknowledging the creation of the Academy Museum of Motion Pictures
Sandra Bullock	Presenter of the award for Best Film Editing
Jennifer Lawrence	Introducer of the performance of Best Song nominee "Skyfall"
Nicole Kidman	Presenter of the films Silver Linings Playbook, Django Unchained and Amour on the Best Picture segment
Daniel Radcliffe; Kristen Stewart	Presenters of the award for Best Production Design
Salma Hayek	Presenter of the segment of the Honorary Academy Awards and the Jean Hersholt Humanitarian Award
George Clooney	Presenter of "In Memoriam" tribute
Richard Gere; Queen Latifah; Renée Zellweger; Catherine Zeta-Jones	Introducers of the performance of Best Song nominee "Everybody Needs a Best Friend" and presenters of the awards for Best Original Score and Best Original Song
Dustin Hoffman; Charlize Theron	Presenters of the awards for Best Adapted Screenplay and Best Original Screenplay
Michael Douglas; Jane Fonda	Presenters of the award for Best Director
Jean Dujardin	Presenter of the award for Best Actress
Meryl Streep	Presenter of the award for Best Actor
Jack Nicholson; Michelle Obama	Presenters of the award for Best Picture

=== Performers ===
Name(s)	Role	Performed
William Ross	Musical arranger and conductor	Orchestral
Seth MacFarlane; Gay Men's Chorus of Los Angeles; Channing Tatum; Charlize Theron; Joseph Gordon-Levitt; Daniel Radcliffe	Performers	"We Saw Your Boobs" during the opening segment (MacFarlane and GMCLA) "The Way You Look Tonight" from Swing Time (MacFarlane, Tatum and Theron) "High Hopes" from A Hole in the Head (MacFarlane, Gordon-Levitt and Radcliffe) "Be Our Guest" from Beauty and the Beast
Shirley Bassey	Performer	"Goldfinger" from Goldfinger during the "Fifty Years of Bond" tribute
Catherine Zeta-Jones	Performer	"All That Jazz" from Chicago
Jennifer Hudson	Performer	"And I Am Telling You I'm Not Going" from Dreamgirls
Samantha Barks; Sacha Baron Cohen; Helena Bonham Carter; Russell Crowe; Anne Hathaway; Hugh Jackman; Eddie Redmayne; Amanda Seyfried; Aaron Tveit	Performers	"Suddenly" and "One Day More" from Les Misérables
Adele	Performer	"Skyfall" from Skyfall
Barbra Streisand	Performer	"The Way We Were" during the annual "In Memoriam" tribute
Norah Jones	Performer	"Everybody Needs a Best Friend" from Ted
Seth MacFarlane; Kristin Chenoweth	Performers	"Here's to the Losers" during the closing credits

== Ceremony information ==
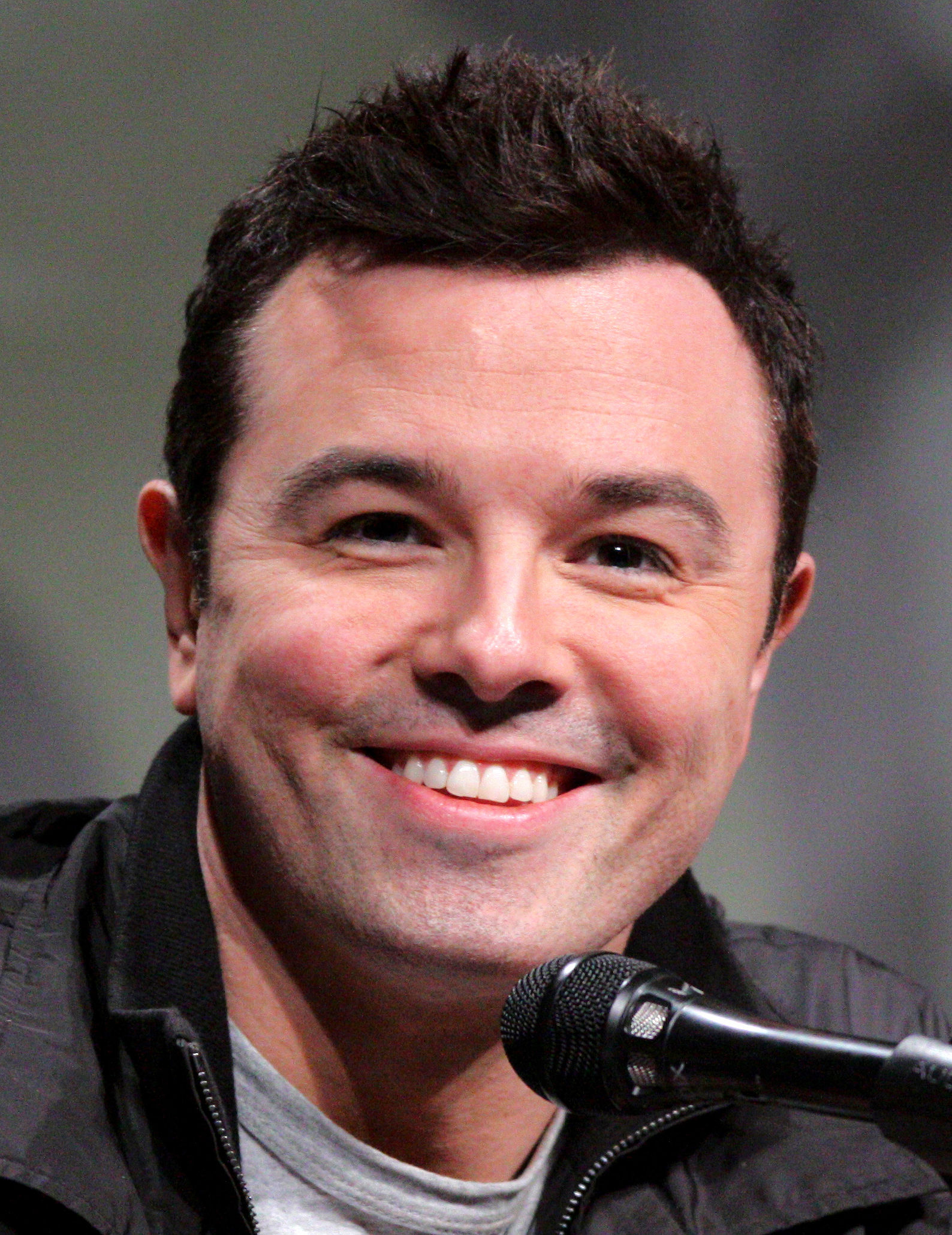
Seth MacFarlane hosted the 85th Academy Awards

In June 2012, the Academy announced that the Best Makeup category would be renamed as Best Makeup and Hairstyling starting from next year. Additionally, in August 2012, it renamed the Best Art Direction category to Best Production Design.

Due to declining interest and viewership in recent ceremonies, the Academy hired a new production team in an attempt to improve ratings and revive interest in the ceremony. Reports surfaced that Academy then-president Tom Sherak approached television producer Lorne Michaels for producing duties with actor and comedian Jimmy Fallon as host. However, the telecast's broadcaster ABC objected to these selections, and both men declined afterward. With newly elected Academy president Hawk Koch assuming leadership duties, the Academy hired Neil Meron and Craig Zadan in August 2012 to produce the ceremony. Two months later, the Academy announced that actor, director, animator, singer, and comedian Seth MacFarlane would host the telecast. MacFarlane expressed that it was truly an honor and a thrill to be asked to host Academy Awards commenting, "It's truly an overwhelming privilege to be asked to host the Oscars. My thoughts upon hearing the news were, one, I will do my utmost to live up to the high standards set forth by my predecessors; and two, I hope they don't find out I hosted the Charlie Sheen Roast." In an unusual break from previous years, producers Meron and Zadan announced that the on-air telecast of the ceremony would be simply referred to as "The Oscars" instead of "The 85th Annual Academy Awards".

As evident by the numerous musical numbers featured throughout the telecast, the ceremony was billed as a salute to music and the movies. In keeping with the theme of the evening, numerous film scores from various motion pictures were played intermittently throughout the ceremony; most notable was John Williams' theme music from Jaws, which was used to goad winners off the stage if their acceptance speeches were overly long. In a departure from having the orchestra perform in the same theatre, composer Williams Ross conducted the orchestra from a studio inside the Capitol Records Building a mile away.

Several other people were involved with the telecast and its promotion. Tony Award-winning art director Derek McLane designed a new set and stage design for the ceremony. Rob Ashford served as choreographer for several musical numbers during the event. Comedians Ben Gleib and Annie Greenup served as correspondents and hosts of "Oscar Road Trip", a nationwide bus tour promoting the ceremony in eleven major cities across the United States. Six young film students from colleges across the country, who were selected from a contest conducted by AMPAS and MtvU, were recruited to appear onstage to deliver Oscar statuettes to the presenters during the gala.

=== Introduction of electronic voting system ===
In January 2012, AMPAS announced that it would create electronic voting system starting with the 2013 ceremony as another method for members to select the nominees and winners during the process. According to AMPAS Chief Operating Officer Ric Robertson, the implementation of the digital ballot was designed to increase participation among members in the voting process and to provide an alternative method of voting in case of emergency. Despite several Academy officials denying such reasons, some industry insiders speculated that the introduction of electronic voting was another move toward moving future awards galas to January. The deadline to submit nomination ballots was originally scheduled for January 3, but technological errors and glitches prompted the Academy to move the deadline one day later.

=== Box office performance of nominated films ===
None of the nine Best Picture nominees were among the top ten releases in box office during the nominations. However, four of those films had already earned $100 million in American and Canadian ticket sales. At the time of the announcement of nominations on January 10, Lincoln was the highest-grossing film among the Best Picture nominees with $144 million in domestic box office receipts. The other three films to earn $100 million prior to nominations were Django Unchained with $112 million, Argo with $110 million, and Les Misérables with $103 million. Among the five remaining Best Picture nominees, Life of Pi was the next highest-grossing film with $91.8 million followed by Silver Linings Playbook ($35.7 million), Beasts of the Southern Wild ($11.2 million), Zero Dark Thirty ($4.4 million), and finally Amour ($311,247). (Note: Both Life of Pi and Silver Linings Playbook would eventually earn over $100 million in domestic ticket sales before the ceremony on February 24. Zero Dark Thirty was the number one film at the American box office during the weekend of January 11–13; the movie eventually grossed $91 million prior to the awards gala.) The combined gross of the nine Best Picture nominees when the Oscars were announced was $620 million with an average gross of $68.9 million per film.

Of the top 50 grossing movies of the year, 61 nominations went to 15 films on the list. Only Brave (8th), Wreck-It Ralph (13th), Lincoln (17th), Django Unchained (23rd), Argo (26th), Les Misérables (27th), Flight (30th), and Life of Pi (31st) were nominated for Best Picture, Best Animated Feature, or any of the directing, acting, or screenwriting awards. The other top 50 box office hits that earned nominations were Marvel's The Avengers (1st), Skyfall (4th), The Hobbit: An Unexpected Journey (6th), Ted (13th), Snow White and the Huntsman (15th), Prometheus (20th), and Mirror Mirror (44th).

=== "We Saw Your Boobs" controversy ===
During the opening monologue, MacFarlane is told by James T. Kirk (William Shatner) (Captain Kirk set in the next day) about how he was going to ruin the telecast, Captain Kirk then shows him a music video where MacFarlane sings We Saw Your Boobs. Its lyrics lists out movies that featured scenes of actresses' disrobing.

The song has mixed reviews. On the positive side, The Guardian reported, "MacFarlane was employed partly to puncture the event's pomposity, which he did by lightheartedly pointing out that some of the world's most self-important people regularly get their kit off for money". SheKnows wondered if the live reaction of some of the actresses were indeed acting as the "pre-recorded spoof apparently looked real enough for social media to worry about it". On the negative side, actress Jane Fonda stated, "if they want to stoop to that, why not list all the penises we've seen? Better yet, remember that this is a telecast seen around the world watched by families with their children and to many this is neither appropriate or funny." California assemblywoman Bonnie Lowenthal and state senator Hannah-Beth Jackson expressed their disappointment at MacFarlane, ABC, and AMPAS in a press release reading, "there was a disturbing theme about violence against women being acceptable and funny. From topical jabs about domestic violence to singing about 'boobs' during a film's rape scene, Seth MacFarlane crossed the line from humor to misogyny." Amy Davidson of The New Yorker interpreted the song as hostile to women.

In a press release statement, the Academy defended MacFarlane for expressing his artistic freedom, "If the Oscars are about anything, they're about creative freedom. We think the show's producers Craig Zadan and Neil Meron, and host Seth MacFarlane did a great job and we hope our worldwide audience found the show entertaining."

=== Critical reviews ===
The show received a mixed reception from media publications. Some media outlets were more critical of the show. Columnist Owen Gleiberman of Entertainment Weekly commented "By calling constant attention to the naughty factor", MacFarlane created "an echo chamber of outrage, working a little too hard to top himself with faux-scandalous gags about race, Jews in Hollywood, and the killing of Abraham Lincoln." The Washington Post television critic Hank Stuever bemoaned, "There was nothing notably terrible about the show, and nothing particularly enthralling." Regarding MacFarlane's performance as host, Stuever noted, "What you got was a combination of sicko and retro, an Oscar show hosted by someone who waited until Oscar night to discover that he's only so-so at stand-up comedy." Television editor Alan Sepinwall of HitFix lamented that the ceremony made for a "frequently messy, but occasionally surprising and/or entertaining evening." He added that MacFarlane "had some funny moments here and there, but he missed way more than he hit, and Frat Boy Seth quickly assumed dominance as the evening went along."

Other media outlets received the broadcast and more positively. Tim Goodman of The Hollywood Reporter praised MacFarlane's performance saying that he did "impressively better than one would have wagered." He also noted that he added "plenty of niceties with a little bit of the Ricky Gervais bite-the-hand-that-feeds-you thing and worked the juxtaposition rather nicely. Chicago Tribune television critic Nina Metz lauded MacFarlane for keeping "a solid handle on the proceedings." She also remarked that the host "opened with a series of jokes that were bona fide winners, landing on just the right tone: confident but not cocksure". Associated Press critic Frazier Moore extolled MacFarlane observing that he "seized the camera Sunday as host of ABC's Oscarcast and proved to its vast audience that he's a ridiculously versatile entertainer, a guy who can be as charming as he is famously irreverent, even polarizing."

=== Ratings and reception ===
The American telecast on ABC drew in an average of 40.38 million people over its length, which was a 3% increase from the previous year's ceremony. An estimated 80.748 million total viewers watched all or part of the awards evening, including the pre-show and the post-show hosted by Jimmy Kimmel. The show also drew higher Nielsen ratings compared to the two previous ceremonies with 24.47% of households watching over a 35.65 share. In addition, the program scored its highest key demo ratings in six years with a 13.71 rating over a 33.45 share among viewers in the 18–49 demographic.

In July 2013, the ceremony presentation received nine nominations for the 65th Primetime Emmys. The following month, the ceremony didn't win any of the nominations.

== "In Memoriam" ==
The annual "In Memoriam" segment was presented by actor/producer/director George Clooney. The montage featured an excerpt of the main title from Out of Africa by composer John Barry. At the end of the tribute, singer Barbra Streisand sang "The Way We Were" from the film of the same name in tribute to composer Marvin Hamlisch.

- Ernest Borgnine – Actor
- Eiko Ishioka – Costume designer
- Ralph McQuarrie – Conceptual designer, illustrator
- Jack Klugman – Actor
- Celeste Holm – Actress
- Adam Yauch – Musician, film executive
- Michael Clarke Duncan – Actor
- Charles Durning – Actor
- Carlo Rambaldi – Special effects artist
- Erland Josephson – Actor
- Richard Robbins – Composer
- Stephen Frankfurt – Advertising executive, title designer
- Harris Savides – Cinematographer
- Tonino Guerra – Writer
- J. Michael Riva – Production designer
- Ulu Grosbard – Director
- Herbert Lom – Actor
- Bruce Surtees – Cinematographer
- Andrew Sarris – Film critic
- George A. Bowers – Film editor
- Tony Scott – Director
- Theodore Soderberg – Sound
- Lois W. Smith – Publicist
- Geoffrey G. Ammer – Marketing executive
- Neil Travis – Film editor
- Michael Hopkins – Sound
- John D. Lowry – Image restoration pioneer
- Hal David – Songwriter
- Nora Ephron – Writer, director
- Charles Rosen – Production designer
- Jake Eberts – Executive
- Michael Kohut – Re-recording mixer, executive
- Frank Pierson – Writer, director, Academy president 2001–2005
- Chris Marker – Director, writer
- Charles C. Washburn – Assistant director
- Ray Bradbury – Writer
- Richard Rodney Bennett – Composer
- Robert B. Sherman – Composer, songwriter
- Richard D. Zanuck – Producer
- Matthew Yuricich – Visual effects
- Marvin Hamlisch – Composer, songwriter

== See also ==
- 19th Screen Actors Guild Awards
- 33rd Golden Raspberry Awards
- 33rd Brit Awards
- 55th Grammy Awards
- 65th Primetime Emmy Awards
- 66th British Academy Film Awards
- 37th Laurence Olivier Awards
- 67th Tony Awards
- 70th Golden Globe Awards
- List of submissions to the 85th Academy Awards for Best Foreign Language Film
