= War/Dance =

2007 documentary film by Sean Fine

- DVD cover
- Directed by: Sean Fine; Andrea Nix Fine
- Written by: Sean Fine; Andrea Nix Fine
- Produced by: Albie Hecht Shine Global; Douglas Eger
- Starring: Fabiola Sahagun
- Cinematography: Sean Fine
- Edited by: Jeff Consiglio
- Music by: Asche & Spencer
- Distributed by: THINKFilm
- Release dates: January 19, 2007 (Sundance Film Festival); November 9, 2007 (United States)
- Running time: 105 minutes
- Country: United States
- Language: English

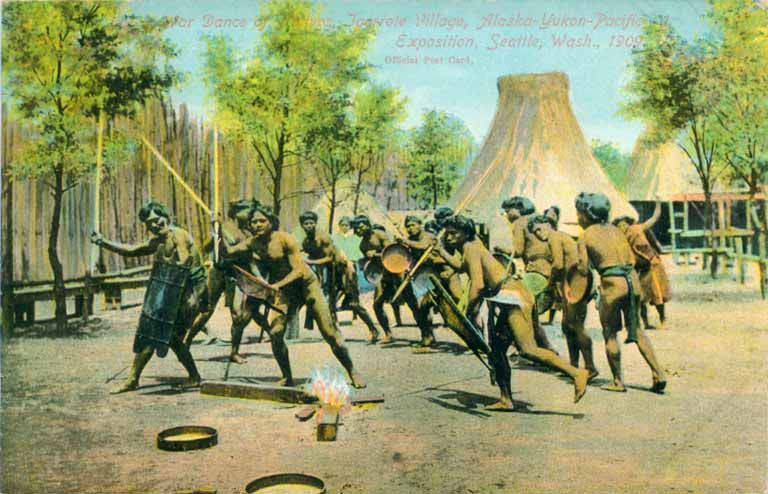
Men performing war dance in Igorrote Village, Alaska-Yukon-Pacific Exposition, Seattle, Washington, 1909

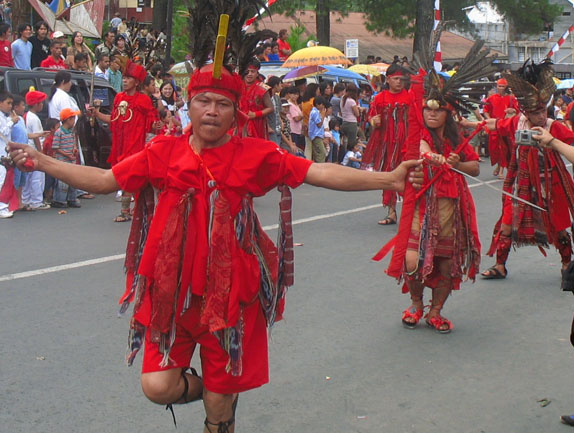
A Kabasaran war dance, performed at a parade 2006

War/Dance is a 2007 American documentary film written and directed by Sean Fine and Andrea Nix Fine, and produced by Shine Global's Susan MacLaury, a professor at Kean University, Albie Hecht, and Douglas Eger. It was nominated for the 2008 Academy Award for Best Documentary Feature and received the Emmy Awards for Best Documentary and Best Cinematography in 2010.

== Synopsis ==
The film centers on three children – Nancy, a 13-year-old choir singer; Rose, a 14-year-old dancer; and Dominic Akena, a 14-year-old xylophone player. They are members of the Acholi ethnic group, living in the remote northern Uganda refugee camp of Patongo, which is under military protection from the Lord's Resistance Army, a terrorist group that has been rebelling against the government for the past two decades. In 2005, the camp's primary school won its regional music competition and headed to Kampala to participate in the annual National Music Competition. War/Dance focuses on three of the eight categories: Western choral performance, instrumental music, and traditional dance, where the students perform the Bwola, the dance of the Acholi. Over the course of three months, the film's creative team observes the three youngsters as they prepare for the event and gain their confidence enough to have them discuss the horrors they have experienced and express their individual fears, hopes, and dreams.

== Release ==
The film debuted at the 2007 Sundance Film Festival, where it won the Documentary Directing Award and was nominated for the Grand Jury Prize for Best Documentary. It was shown at the Cleveland International Film Festival, the Wisconsin Film Festival, the Cannes Film Festival, the Austin Film Festival, and the Tokyo International Film Festival, among others, before going into limited release in the United States in November 2007.

== Critical reception ==
War/Dance received generally positive reviews from critics. The review aggregator Rotten Tomatoes reported that 85% of critics gave the film positive reviews, based on 47 reviews, and an average rating of 7.13/10 — with the consensus that the film "is beautifully filmed, and effectively captures the heartbreaking and uplifting experiences of its subjects." Metacritic reported the film had an average score of 68 out of 100, based on 20 reviews.

In his review in The New York Times, Stephen Holden called the film "visually ravishing" and added, "[it] is so gorgeous that its beauty distracts from the anguish it reveals ... Every shot ... has the polish of a richly hued, impeccably composed illustration ... When individual children, some in tears, tell their stories while gazing directly into the camera, the shots seem posed and their remarks possibly rehearsed. The production notes explain that the children felt more comfortable telling their stories directly to the camera than to an interviewer, but you still have an uneasy sense of being manipulated ... Having voiced these qualms, let me say that War/Dance, in spite of its slickness, is an honorable, sometimes inspiring exploration of the primal healing power of music and dance in an African tribal culture ... The film draws out the suspense as best it can until the inevitable African-style American Idol moment. If that finale is genuinely exhilarating, you are still uncomfortably aware that this ecstatic conclusion doesn't mean the end of the strife or the refugees' troubles. It is a blip of light on a dark canvas."

Kenneth Turan of the Los Angeles Times wrote, "To make a memorable documentary ... that can't be forgotten once seen, you have to be more than gifted, you need an instinct for an unusual story and, frankly, you must have luck on your side. War/Dance ... has all that and more ... [it] is as irresistible as the rhythms of African music on its soundtrack."

In Variety, John Anderson called the film "well-intentioned but a victim of its own high cinematic values" and added, "The young black faces are too beautiful, the landscapes too pretty, and the personal stories of slaughter too scripted ... The formal devices of the film, and the lack of spontaneity in the children's words, do little to sell the message of the movie ... While the pic may be targeting Westerners who want to feel less awful about genocide and global negligence, it's hard to imagine War/Dance appealing to that crowd – or any other."

Rachel Howard of the San Francisco Chronicle wrote, "Visually, the film is anything but gritty, and some might say the cinematic beauty – and the children's controlled, likely coached interviews – glosses reality. But the tension of a brutality that can hardly be imagined let alone depicted, and the dignity of these precociously adult children as they must press on with their lives with little room for mourning or self-pity, is the point. The climactic trip to the competition offers an uplift that feels more like relief than triumph after the film's most disturbing tales."

In The Village Voice, Jim Ridley wrote, "The movie comes across as desperately, even irritatingly contrived, but I'd be lying if I didn't say it overcame my naturally complacent instincts — which would be to watch something (anything) else, to not get haunted by that closing litany of websites for global action."

== Additional awards ==
- Emmy Award for Best Documentary and Best Cinematography (winner)
- Aspen Filmfest Audience Award for Best Documentary (winner)
- Jackson Hole Film Festival Cowboy Award for Best Cinematography (winner)
- Wisconsin Film Festival Audience Award for Best Documentary (winner)
- Woodstock Film Festival Audience Award for Best Documentary Feature (winner)
- Woodstock Film Festival Haskell Wexler Award for Best Cinematography (winner)
- ZagrebDox Film Festival Veliki pečat international competition award (winner)

== Outreach and non-profit work ==
War Dance was produced by the 501(c)(3) non-profit film production company Shine Global. Founded in 2005 by Susan MacLaury and Albie Hecht, it is dedicated to ending the exploitation and abuse of children through films and other media that raise awareness and inspire change. Profits from their productions go back to local advocacy organizations that help the children that Shine documents. Shine Global partnered with AMREF during the production of War/Dance to aid the people of Uganda on the ground. When they returned to Uganda in 2008 to film WAR DANCE RETURNS, the filmmakers donated video equipment to the new Health Education Center that Shine Global helped to fund, and also established the Patongo Scholarship Fund.

== See also ==
- Music of Uganda
- Child soldiers in Uganda
