= LFG (film) =

- Official poster
- Directed by: Andrea Nix Fine; Sean Fine
- Written by: Andrea Nix Fine
- Produced by: Andrea Nix Fine; Sean Fine; Abby Greensfelder
- Starring: Megan Rapinoe; Jessica McDonald; Becky Sauerbrunn; Kelley O'Hara; Christen Press; Sam Mewis; Julie Foudy
- Cinematography: Sean Fine
- Edited by: Jeff Consiglio
- Music by: Barking Owl; Cyrus Melchor; Nicolas Snyder
- Production companies: Everywoman Studios; Change Content; Propagate Content; CNN Films
- Distributed by: HBO Max
- Release dates: June 17, 2021 (Tribeca); June 24, 2021 (United States)
- Running time: 105 minutes
- Country: United States
- Language: English

LFG (Let's Fucking Go!) is a 2021 American documentary film, directed and produced by Andrea Nix Fine and Sean Fine, with Andrea Nix Fine also serving as a writer. It follows Megan Rapinoe, Jessica McDonald, Becky Sauerbrunn, Kelley O'Hara, Christen Press, Sam Mewis and Julie Foudy, as they sue the United States Soccer Federation for pay discrimination.

It had its world premiere at the Tribeca Film Festival on June 17, 2021. It was released on June 24, 2021, by HBO Max.

== Title ==
The acronym LFG stands for the phrase "Let's fucking go!", which is a rallying call for the team.

== Synopsis ==
The film follows Megan Rapinoe, Jessica McDonald, Becky Sauerbrunn, Kelley O'Hara, Christen Press, Sam Mewis, and Julie Foudy as they sue the United States Soccer Federation for pay discrimination.

== Production ==
In March 2021, it was announced Andrea Nix Fine and Sean Fine would direct a documentary film revolving around the U.S. women's national soccer team pay discrimination claim. The film is produced by Everywoman Studios and CNN Films, and distributed by HBO Max.

== Release ==
The film had its world premiere at the Tribeca Film Festival on June 17, 2021. It also screened at AFI Docs on June 23, 2021. It was released on June 24, 2021, by HBO Max.

== Reception ==
LFG received positive reviews from film critics. It holds an 94% approval rating on review aggregator website Rotten Tomatoes, based on 18 reviews, with a weighted average of 8/10. The film has also received negative feedback from some conservative-leaning lawyers, who claim that the film pays little attention to the legal proceeding regarding the case, and fails to explore the specifics of the court's decision to throw out the case. Journalist Emily Reigart stated that "if you are looking to better understand the legal argument for the athletes' case, this is not the film for you", while The Washington Post said "the film itself is just as one-sided".
