= 31st News & Documentary Emmy Awards =

- Date: September 27, 2010
- Location: Rose Hall, Home of Jazz at Lincoln Center; New York City

Television/radio coverage
- Network: C-SPAN (aired October 9th at 8pm)

The 31st News & Documentary Emmy Awards were held on September 27, 2010, at Rose Hall, Home of Jazz at Lincoln Center, located in the Time Warner Center in New York City. They honored the best in American news and documentary programming in 2009. Awards were presented in 41 categories, including Breaking News, Investigative Reporting, Outstanding Interview, and Best Documentary. In attendance were over 900 television and news media industry executives, news and documentary producers and journalists.

Notable awards included the Lifetime Achievement Award given to documentary filmmaker Frederick Wiseman. PBS NewsHour received the Chairman's Award, with it being accepted by longtime news anchor Jim Lehrer, former anchor Robert MacNeil, longtime executive producer Les Crystal, and current executive producer Linda Winslow.

== Winners ==
=== Network breakdown ===
The following chart is a breakdown of number of awards won this awards season per station.

Channel	Number of Emmys This Season
CBS	7
NBC	6
PBS	5
ABC	2
HDNet	2
History Channel	2
National Geographic Channel	2
Planet Green	2
Sundance Channel	2
CNBC	1
Discovery Channel	1
Globeandmail.com	1
HBO	1
NYTimes.com	1
TIME.com	1
VH1	1
KPIX-TV (San Francisco)	1
KHOU-TV (Houston)	1
KSTP-TV (Minneapolis – Saint Paul)	1

=== Breakdown by program ===
Program	Channel	Number of Emmy's This Season
60 Minutes	CBS	4
CBS Evening News With Katie Couric	CBS	3
NBC News Special	NBC	2
NBC Nightly News with Brian Williams	NBC	2
Dateline NBC	NBC	1
Today	NBC	1
Bill Moyers Journal	PBS	1
FRONTLINE	PBS	2
FRONTLINE/World	PBS	1
P.O.V.	PBS	1
ABC News Special Events	ABC	1
Diane Sawyer 20/20 Special	ABC	1
HDNet World Report	HDNet	1
Dan Rather Reports	HDNet	1
Stealing Lincoln’s Body	History Channel	1
WWII in HD	History Channel	1
CIA Confidential: Pakistan Undercover	National Geographic Channel	1
National Geographic’s Most Incredible Photos	National Geographic Channel	1
The Last Beekeeper	Planet Green	1
Reel Impact Series	Planet Green	1
War/Dance	Sundance Channel	2
Inside the Mind of Google	CNBC	1
Wild Pacific	Discovery Channel	1
Behind the Veil	theglobeandmail.com (The Globe and Mail)	1
HBO Documentary Films	HBO	1
One in 8 Million	NYTimes.com	1
The Iconic Photo Series	TIME.com	1
Anvil! The Story of Anvil	VH1	1
KHOU News at 10pm	KHOU-TV (Houston, TX)	1
KPIX Eyewitness News	KPIX-TV (San Francisco, CA)	1
KSTP 5 Eyewitness News	KSTP-TV (Minneapolis, MN)	1

=== Awards ===
Lifetime Achievement Award	Chairman’s Award
Frederick Wiseman	PBS NewsHour
Regularly Scheduled Newscast	News Magazine
Coverage of a Breaking News Story; Miracle on the Hudson, NBC Nightly News with Brian Williams (NBC); Continuing Coverage of a News Story; Unlikely Refuges, NBC Nightly News with Brian Williams (NBC); Feature Story; Fighting Grossmans, Today (NBC); Investigative Journalism; Rape in America: Justice Denied, CBS Evening News with Katie Couric (CBS); Business And Economic Reporting; Financial Family Tree, CBS Evening News with Katie Couric (CBS)	Coverage of a Breaking News Story; Miracle on the Hudson, Dateline NBC (NBC); Continuing Coverage of a News Story; War in Pakistan, 60 Minutes (CBS); Feature Story; South Africa's Shame: Modern‑Day Slavery and the World Cup, HDNet World Report (HDNet); Investigative Journalism; Ghana: Digital Dumping Ground, FRONTLINE/World (PBS); Business And Economic Reporting; Iran's Manhattan Project, Dan Rather Reports (HDNet)
Long Form	Interview
Live Coverage of a Current News Story; Inauguration 2009 ‑ Barack Obama, ABC News Special Events (ABC); Continuing Coverage of a News Story; A Death in Tehran, FRONTLINE (PBS); Investigative Journalism; The Warning, FRONTLINE (PBS); Informational Programming; Which Way Home, HBO Documentary Films (HBO); Historical Programming; The Good Soldier, Bill Moyers Journal (PBS); Business And Economic Reporting; Inside the Mind of Google (CNBC)	Saving Flight 1549 60 Minutes (CBS)
Programming	Best Story In A Regularly Scheduled Newscast
Arts & Culture; Anvil! The Story of Anvil (VH1); Science And Technology; The English Surgeon (PBS); Nature; The Last Beekeeper (Planet Green)	The Battle of Wanat, CBS Evening News with Katie Couric (CBS)
Best Report In A News Magazine	Best Documentary
The Winter of Our Hardship and The Long Recession, 60 Minutes (CBS)	War/Dance (Sundance Channel)
New Approaches To News & Documentary Programming:	Individual Achievement In A Craft:
Current News Coverage; Behind the Veil (Globeandmail.com); Documentaries; One in 8 Million (NYTimes.com); Arts, Lifestyle & Culture; The Iconic Photo Series (Time.com)	Writing; Inside the Obama White House, NBC News Special (NBC); Research; Split Estate, Reel Impact Series (Planet Green); Cinematography - Nature; Survivors, Wild Pacific (Discovery Channel); Cinematography - News Coverage / Documentaries; War/Dance (Sundance Channel); Editing; Afghan Warrior, National Geographic's Most Incredible Photos (National Geographic Channel); Editing–Quick Turnaround; Inside the Obama White House, NBC News Special (NBC); Graphic Design & Art Direction; Stealing Lincoln's Body (History Channel); Music & Sound; Point of No Return, WWII in HD (History Channel); Lighting Direction & Scenic Design; CIA Confidential: Pakistan Undercover (National Geographic Channel)
Promotional Announcement:	Regional News Story
Institutional; 60 Minutes in 60 Seconds, 60 Minutes (CBS); Episodic; A Hidden America: Children of the Mountains, Diane Sawyer 20/20 Special (ABC)	Spot News; Oakland Riot, KPIX Eyewitness News (KPIX-TV (San Francisco, CA)); Investigative Reporting; Soldiers at Risk: The Iraq Water Investigation, KHOU News at 10pm (KHOU-TV (Houston, TX)); Prisoners Ride the Bus, KSTP 5 Eyewitness News (KSTP-TV (Minneapolis, MN))

== Nominees ==
- By station
- By award category

== Presenters ==
- Diane Sawyer, anchor, ABC World News
- Lester Holt, weekend anchor, NBC Nightly News and weekend co-anchor, Today
- Sheila Nevins, President, HBO Documentary Films
- Dan Rather, anchor and managing editor, Dan Rather Reports
- Bob Simon, correspondent, 60 Minutes
- Paula Zahn, Executive Producer/Host, On the Case with Paula Zahn
- Paula A. Kerger, President and CEO- PBS
- Roger Mudd, former Washington correspondent for CBS News, NBC News and the MacNeil/Lehrer NewsHour
