= Sean Fine =

American cinematographer, producer, and film director

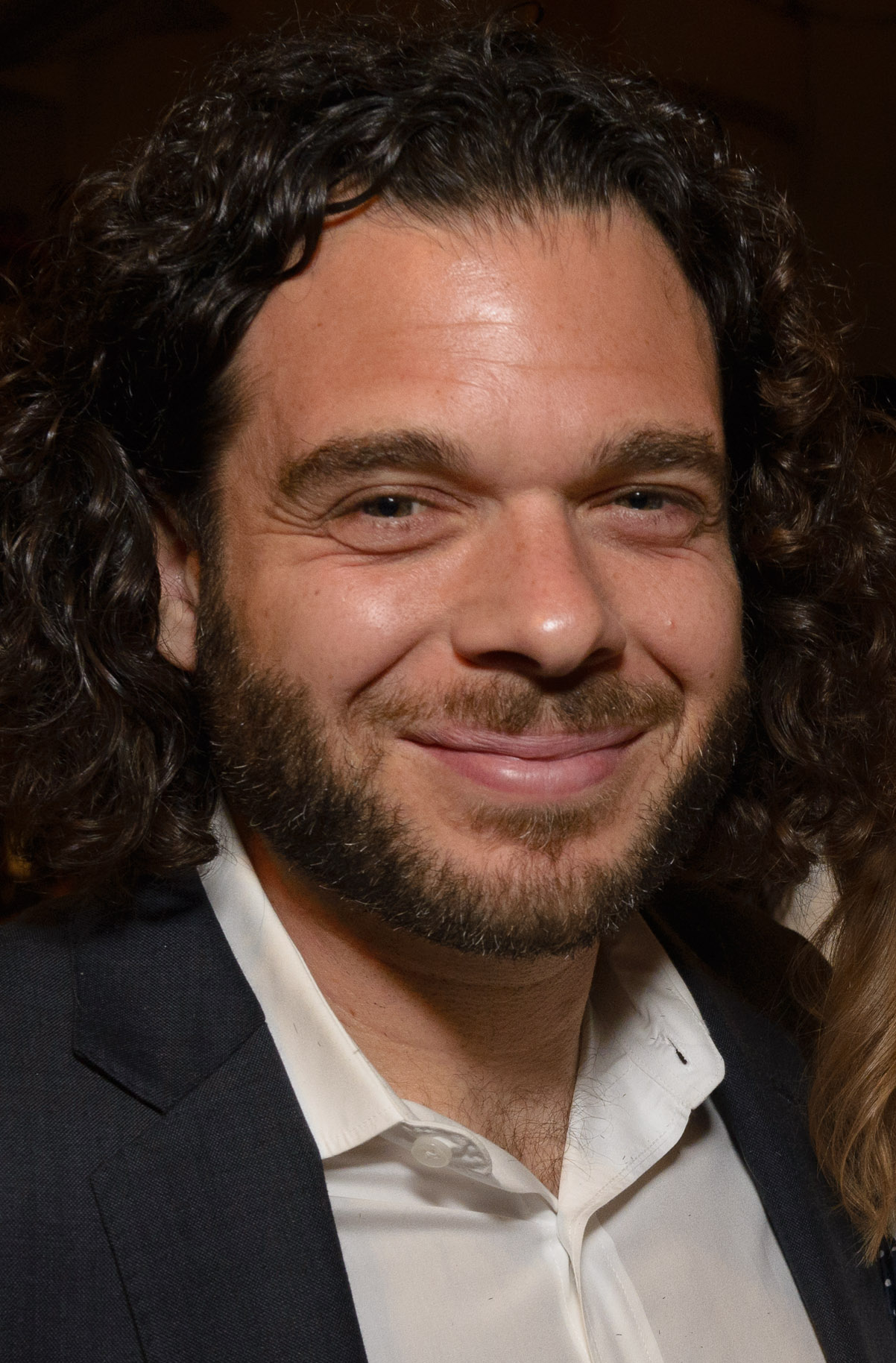
- Fine at the 73rd Peabody Awards
- Born: United States
- Education: Connecticut College (BA); New York University
- Occupation(s): Filmmaker, cinematographer
- Spouse: Andrea Nix Fine (m. 2003)

Sean Fine is an American cinematographer, producer and film director whose film Inocente won the 2013 Academy Award for Best Documentary (Short Subject). He directs his films with his wife, Andrea Nix Fine. The Fines' first feature-length film War/Dance about child soldiers was nominated for an Academy Award for Best Documentary Feature in 2007. In 2013 their film, Life According to Sam won both a Peabody Award and an Emmy Award for Exceptional Merit in Documentary filmmaking. The Fines launched a boutique film studio Change Content to develop documentaries that affect way audiences feel about critical issues. Change Content's first film LFG premiered at the Tribeca Film Festival and was instrumental in the U.S. Women's National Soccer Team achieving equal pay.

== Life and career ==
Fine grew up around filmmaking. His parents co-directed award-winning documentary programs for CBS and 60 Minutes, with his father also being the cinematographer and his mother the film editor. Fine's grandfather was the photographer for the Washington Redskins for over 50 years, making Fine a 3rd generation photographer. He attributes his eye to learning from his father and grandfather, and his editing skills to watching his mother work throughout his childhood. He attended Georgetown Day School in Washington, D.C., and is a 1996 graduate of Connecticut College, where he earned a degree in Zoology. It was not until he took a summer film course at NYU Tisch School of the Arts that he realized he wanted to make films for a living. After graduating from college, he went to work for National Geographic, where he met his wife, Andrea Nix.

Within a year after starting to work for National Geographic, he was directing his first documentary, which won two national Emmy Awards. During his time at National Geographic, Fine traveled to over 30 countries and gained experience shooting in very difficult and remote locations. In 2004, Fine and his wife left National Geographic to start their own production company, Fine Films. They decided to make a documentary about the twenty-year-old civil war in northern Uganda after having been contacted by a non-profit, Shine Global. Their son was a year old at the time of filming, causing them to stay in separate parts of Uganda during filming due to the dangers involved.

He was nominated for an Academy Award for Best Documentary Feature in 2007 for War/Dance, which he produced with his wife, Andrea Nix. They also collaborated on the 2013 documentary, Life According to Sam, produced by HBO and the 2021 documentary LFG about the U.S. Women's National Soccer Team's fight for equal pay.

== Filmography ==
- War/Dance (2007)
- Lindsey Vonn: In the Moment (2011)
- Inocente (2012)
- Life According to Sam (2013)
- LFG (2021)
- The Sixth (2024)
