= Andrea Nix Fine =

American documentary film director

- Born: United States
- Occupation: Filmmaker
- Spouse: Sean Fine (m. 2003)

Andrea Nix Fine is an Oscar and Emmy Award winning American documentary film director. Her film The Sixth won the Emmy Award for Outstanding Politics and Government Documentary in 2025 and her film Inocente won the Academy Award for Best Documentary (Short Subject) in 2013.

The Fines were also nominated for the Academy Award for Best Documentary Feature in 2007 for War/Dance, a story about the power of music to heal and transform the lives of children living in Uganda's war zone, and their 2013 HBO documentary Life According to Sam was honored with a Peabody and Emmy award.

She co-owns Change Content with her husband, Sean Fine where they develop documentaries that affect way audiences feel about critical issues. Change Content's first film LFG (film) premiered at the Tribeca Film Festival and was instrumental in the U.S. Women's National Soccer Team achieving equal pay. In 2025, their documentary The Sixth, which chronicles the January 6 attacks on the U.S. Capitol. Despite struggles to find a home for the film due to political pressure, they won the Emmy Award for Outstanding Politics and Government Documentary.

== Life and career ==
Nix grew up in Rochester, New York and later attended Colby College. Nix made her first film in a college class where the professor required the making of a documentary in place of a written term paper at the end. After her first day of shooting, she realized that filmmaking was what she wanted to pursue in life. She sought out numerous jobs after college where she could learn more about filmmaking, and went on to National Geographic in Washington, D.C., where she met her husband, Sean Fine.

Nix went on to direct films around the world for National Geographic, notably in Naples, Costa Rica, and the Arctic Circle. She has stated that she loves that "making documentaries opens a rare and privileged door into the lives of others." In 2004, the Fines left National Geographic and began their own production company Fine Films. After being contacted by the non-profit, Shine Global, the Fines went on to make a documentary film about the twenty-year-old civil war in Uganda called War/Dance. Nix was nominated for an Academy Award for Best Documentary Feature for War/Dance, which she produced with her husband, Sean Fine. The Fines went on to collaborate on the 2013 documentary film Life According to Sam, produced by HBO which went on to win a Peabody Award.

In 2021 the Fines launched an impact studio Change Content. Change Content's first film LFG (film) was about the U.S. Women's National Soccer Team fight for equal pay.

In 2025, Fine and her husband and Change Content directing partner Sean Fine released The Sixth, a documentary capturing the dramatic and unflinching story of the January 6, 2021, attacks on the U.S. Capitol. The film won the Emmy Award for Outstanding Politics and Government Documentary, increasing its visibility after initial hesitancy from streaming platforms to acquire it due to its subject matter.

== Filmography ==
- War/Dance (2007)
- Lindsey Vonn: In the Moment (2011)
- Inocente (2012)
- Life According to Sam (2013)
- LFG (2021)
- The Sixth (2024)
