= Inocente =

- Directed by: Sean Fine; Andrea Nix
- Produced by: Sean Fine; Andrea Nix
- Cinematography: Sean Fine
- Production company: Shine Global
- Distributed by: ShortsHD (theatrical); The Cinema Guild (DVD)
- Release date: 2012
- Running time: 40 minutes
- Country: United States

Inocente is a 2012 short documentary film directed by Sean Fine and Andrea Nix. The film received the 2013 Academy Award for Best Documentary (Short Subject). The film is an inspiring coming-of-age story of a 15-year-old girl in California. Though homeless and undocumented, she refuses to give up on her dream of being an artist, proving that the hand she has been dealt does not define her – her dreams do.

The film was partially financed by the crowdfunding website Kickstarter and was the first crowdfunded film to win an Oscar.

After being nominated for an Academy Award, the film was released along with all the other 15 Oscar-nominated short films in theaters by ShortsHD. The film is also available for communities and schools along with companion arts workshops developed by Shine Global and partners.
