= List of Ryan's Mystery Playdate episodes =

Ryan's Mystery Playdate is an American children's television series created by Albie Hecht for Nickelodeon, and produced by PocketWatch. The series is based on the Ryan's World YouTube channel, which signed an advertising deal with PocketWatch in 2017. In the United States, the show's 20 episodes were acquired by the Nick Jr. Channel for a premiere date of April 19, 2019.

== Series overview ==
Season	Episodes		Originally released		
Season	Episodes		First released	Last released	Network
1	20		April 19, 2019	September 20, 2019	Nickelodeon
2	20		September 30, 2019	February 20, 2020	Nickelodeon
3	20		March 30, 2020	February 26, 2021	Nickelodeon
4	30	18	May 3, 2021	November 4, 2021	Nickelodeon
4	30	12	April 11, 2023	April 16, 2023	Nick Jr.

== Episodes ==
=== Season 1 (2019) ===
No. overall	No. in season	Title	Original release date	Prod. code	U.S. viewers (millions)
1	1	"Ryan's Kickin' Playdate"	April 19, 2019	101	1.00
1	1	"Ryan's Viral Playdate"	April 19, 2019	101	1.00
Guest stars: Kieran Tamondong (Karate Blackbelt), Randy Word (Sensei), Mar Mar (YouTuber)
2	2	"Ryan's Kick-Flipping Playdate"	April 20, 2019	102	0.72
2	2	"Ryan's Experimental Playdate"	April 20, 2019	102	0.72
Guest stars: Tony Hawk (Skateboarder), Kate Biberdorf (Chemist)
3	3	"Ryan's Super Playdate"	April 26, 2019	103	0.69
3	3	"Ryan's Tricky Playdate"	April 26, 2019	103	0.69
Guest stars: Cooper Barnes (as Captain Man from Henry Danger), Murray SawChuck (Magician)
4	4	"Ryan's Colorful Playdate"	May 3, 2019	104	0.61
4	4	"Ryan's Wild Playdate"	May 3, 2019	104	0.61
Guest stars: Katie Matie (Face painter), Kirstin McMillan (Animal expert)
5	5	"Ryan's Fiery Playdate"	May 10, 2019	105	0.65
5	5	"Ryan's Crafty Playdate"	May 10, 2019	105	0.65
Guest stars: Brett Nagel (Firefighter), Karina Garcia (YouTube crafter)
6	6	"Ryan's Champion Playdate"	May 17, 2019	106	0.55
6	6	"Ryan's Traveling Playdate"	May 17, 2019	106	0.55
Guest stars: Laurie Hernandez (Gymnast), Nancy Gneier (Train Driver)
7	7	"Ryan's Rockin' Playdate"	May 27, 2019	107	0.88
7	7	"Ryan's Out-Of-This World Playdate"	May 27, 2019	107	0.88
Guest stars: Xander Marsden (Guitar Player), Alyssa Carson (Astronaut)
8	8	"Ryan's Yummy Playdate"	June 7, 2019	108	0.89
8	8	"Ryan's Speedy Playdate"	June 7, 2019	108	0.89
Guest stars: Tony Gemignani (Pizza tosser), Dan Dunn (Speed painter)
9	9	"Ryan's Jumpin' Playdate"	June 28, 2019	109	0.59
9	9	"Ryan's Twisty Playdate"	June 28, 2019	109	0.59
Guest stars: Nia Sioux (Dancer), Sean Edwards (Balloon artist)
10	10	"Ryan's Handy Playdate"	July 12, 2019	111	0.59
10	10	"Ryan's Really Fast Playdate"	July 12, 2019	111	0.59
Guest stars: Joe Arrigo (Construction worker), Christian Brooks (Race car driver)
11	11	"Ryan's Rainy Day Playdate"	July 26, 2019	110	0.78
11	11	"Ryan's Dunking Playdate"	July 26, 2019	110	0.78
Guest stars: Maria Quiban (Weather forecaster), Karlie Samuelson (WNBA player)
12	12	"Ryan's Wild West Playdate"	August 19, 2019	112	0.69
12	12	"Ryan's Stringy Playdate"	August 19, 2019	112	0.69
Guest stars: Clay Regner (Cowboy), Justin Dauer (Yo-yo pro)
13	13	"Ryan's Spinning Playdate"	August 20, 2019	113	0.58
13	13	"Ryan's Icy Playdate"	August 20, 2019	113	0.58
Guest stars: Nhandi Craig (Credited as DJ Young 1) (DJ), Jessica Ibarra (Ice cream maker)
14	14	"Ryan's Spiffy Playdate"	August 21, 2019	114A	0.48
Guest star: John Slover (Barber)
15	15	"Ryan's Beachy Playdate"	August 22, 2019	114B	0.44
Guest star: Kingsley Nicol (Credited as King Nicol) (Surfer)
16	16	"Ryan's Amazing Playdate"	August 23, 2019	115	0.57
16	16	"Ryan's Marching Playdate"	August 23, 2019	115	0.57
Guest stars: Josh Horton (Juggler), USC Drumline
17	17	"Ryan's Jokey Playdate"	September 16, 2019	116	0.50
17	17	"Ryan's Veggie Playdate"	September 16, 2019	116	0.50
Guest stars: Drew Massey (Puppeteer), Suzannah Underwood (Farmer)
18	18	"Ryan's Protective Playdate"	September 17, 2019	117	0.48
18	18	"Ryan's High-Flying Playdate"	September 17, 2019	117	0.48
Guest stars: Tim Olsen (Police officer), Aaron E. Green (Pilot)
19	19	"Ryan's Winning Playdate"	September 18, 2019	118	0.62
19	19	"Ryan's Musical Playdate"	September 18, 2019	118	0.62
Guest stars: Brandi Chastain (Soccer Player), Claire Ryann (Credited as Claire Crosby) (Singer)
20	20	"Ryan's High-Score Playdate"	September 19, 2019	120	0.44
20	20	"Ryan's Athletic Playdate"	September 19, 2019	120	0.44
Guest stars: EvanTubeHD (YouTuber), Cherry Buenaflor (Gym teacher)
21	21	"Ryan's Sweet Playdate"	September 20, 2019	119	0.36
21	21	"Ryan's Healthy Playdate"	September 20, 2019	119	0.36
Guest stars: Duff Goldman (Baker), Dr. Paul Horowitz (Doctor)

=== Season 2 (2019–20) ===
No. overall	No. in season	Title	Original release date	Prod. code	U.S. viewers (millions)
22	1	"Ryan's Family Playdate"	September 30, 2019	201	0.60
22	1	"Ryan's Brave Playdate"	September 30, 2019	201	0.60
Guest stars: Rita Mitchell, Mirthell Mitchell, Shiloh Mitchell, Shasha Mitchell, Sinead Mitchell, Shalom Mitchell (The Onyx Family), Frank Lew Knopp (Navy SEAL)
23	2	"Ryan's Short Stack Playdate"	October 1, 2019	203	0.43
23	2	"Ryan's Stamped Playdate"	October 1, 2019	203	0.43
Guest stars: Jenny Wilmore (Pancake artist), Carl Mitchell (Mail carrier)
24	3	"Ryan's Chopping Playdate"	October 2, 2019	204	0.53
24	3	"Ryan's Skatin' Playdate"	October 2, 2019	204	0.53
Guest stars: Casey Garrison (Lumberjack), Alijah Holden, Beatrice Landau, Penelope Landau, Lillith Ricondo, and Hannah Bivins (Roller Derby Skaters)
25	4	"Ryan's Camera Ready Playdate"	October 3, 2019	208	0.47
25	4	"Ryan's Rattlin' Playdate"	October 3, 2019	208	0.47
Guest stars: Maria Menounos (Reporter), Landen Morris (Auctioneer)
26	5	"Ryan's Spooky Playdate"	October 18, 2019	209	0.58
Guest stars: Angela DeSilva (Witch), E-Kan Soong (Werewolf), Josh Butcher (Mummy), Josh Holt (Vampire)
27	6	"Ryan's Golden Playdate"	October 28, 2019	206	0.54
27	6	"Ryan's Free Fallin' Playdate"	October 28, 2019	206	0.54
Guest stars: Gabby Douglas (Olympic artistic gymnast), Joseph Webb (Skydiver)
28	7	"Ryan's Rose Worthy Playdate"	October 29, 2019	207	0.42
28	7	"Ryan's Animated Playdate"	October 29, 2019	207	0.42
Guest stars: Adam Rippon (Olympic figure skater), Butch Hartman (Animator)
29	8	"Ryan's Fixer-Upper Playdate"	October 30, 2019	211	0.46
29	8	"Ryan's Hoppin' Playdate"	October 30, 2019	211	0.46
Guest stars: Drew Scott (Property Brother), Nick Woodard and Mike Fry (Jump ropers)
30	9	"Ryan's Legendary Playdate"	October 31, 2019	212	0.49
30	9	"Ryan's Master Handed Playdate"	October 31, 2019	212	0.49
Guest stars: Dave Grohl (himself), Matias Farias (Shadow puppeteer)
31	10	"Ryan's Merry Playdate"	December 2, 2019	213	0.57
Guest stars: Shayne Sutphen (Elf), Phil Moore (Wrapping Rapper), Liam Haynes (Jack Frost), Katherine Kivinski, Tehilla Alphonso, Jacquain Sloan, Samuel Jung (Carolers), Jack Leb, Maxwell Gabriel, Stone Henry Eisel, Scarlett Tucker, Hudson Tucker, Morgan Sutphen, Beaux Blasman, River Blasman (Snowball Fight Kids), Rosanna Pansino (herself), Emma Kaji, Kate Kaji (Twin Cookie Eaters), Ed Taylor (Santa Claus)
32	11	"Ryan's Nimble Playdate"	December 3, 2019	202	0.53
32	11	"Ryan's Hilarious Playdate"	December 3, 2019	202	0.53
Guest stars: Giselle Lomelino, Evangeline Lomelino, and Mercedes Lomelino (GEM Sisters), Jessie Graff (Stunt woman)
33	12	"Ryan's Subscribed Playdate"	December 4, 2019	210A	0.62
Guest star: LaurDIY (YouTuber)
34	13	"Ryan's Plundering Playdate"	December 5, 2019	210B	0.44
Guest stars: Paul Galliano, Brandon Pugmire (Pirates)
35	14	"Ryan's Global Playdate"	December 9, 2019	215A	0.49
Guest stars: Fatima Fracine, Corey Jamaine Law, Anthony Atkinson, Nathaniel Nathan, Lofton (Harlem Globetrotters)
36	15	"Ryan's Stacked Playdate"	December 10, 2019	215B	0.59
Guest star: Steven Purugganan (Cup Stacker)
37	16	"Ryan's Swift Playdate"	December 11, 2019	216A	0.57
Guest star: Lolo Jones (herself)
38	17	"Ryan's Delicious Playdate"	December 12, 2019	216B	0.58
Guest star: Amber Kelly (Chef)
39	18	"Ryan's Leading Playdate"	December 16, 2019	217A	0.54
Guest star: Becky Hammon (Coach)
40	19	"Ryan's Balanced Playdate"	December 17, 2019	217B	0.54
Guest stars: Kyle Alviani, Eli Brill (Unicyclers)
41	20	"Ryan's Spectacular Playdate"	December 18, 2019	218A	0.56
Guest star: Kristen Michelle Wilson (Circus Ringmaster)
42	21	"Ryan's Feathery Playdate"	December 19, 2019	218B	0.57
Guest stars: Meagan Platt, Nicole Wilson, Mollie Hogan (Bird Handlers)
43	22	"Ryan's Gliding Playdate"	January 13, 2020	214A	0.51
Guest star: Brodie Smith (Flying Disk Phenom)
44	23	"Ryan's Climbin' Playdate"	January 14, 2020	214B	0.44
Guest star: Lilysa Shar (Rock Climber)
45	24	"Ryan's Daring Playdate"	January 15, 2020	219A	0.55
Guest star: Haiden "Danger Boy" Deegan (Motocross Rider)
46	25	"Ryan's Sortin' Playdate"	January 16, 2020	219B	0.46
Guest star: Marc Harismendy (Garbage Worker)
47	26	"Ryan's Pinned Playdate"	February 17, 2020	205A	0.84
Guest star: Braun Strowman (WWE Superstar)
48	27	"Ryan's Sudsy Playdate"	February 18, 2020	205B	0.52
Guest star: Deni Yang (Bubblist)
49	28	"Ryan's Jungle Lovin' Playdate"	February 19, 2020	220A	0.55
Guest star: Jules Sylvester (Reptile Expert)
50	29	"Ryan's Plunging Playdate"	February 20, 2020	220B	0.54
Guest star: Gary Plante (Plumber)

=== Season 3 (2020–21) ===
No. overall	No. in season	Title	Original release date	Prod. code	U.S. viewers (millions)
51	1	"Ryan's Slithering Playdate"	March 30, 2020	301A	0.48
Guest star: Jules Sylvester (Jules of the Jungle)
52	2	"Ryan's Foamy Playdate"	March 31, 2020	301B	0.57
Guest star: Tom Dang (Hot Cocoa Artist)
53	3	"Ryan's Frosty Playdate"	April 1, 2020	302A	0.56
Guest star: Douglas Farnsworth (Ice Sculptor)
54	4	"Ryan's Tasty Playdate"	April 2, 2020	302B	0.49
Guest star: Debi Min (Sushi Chef)
55	5	"Ryan's Sweet Treat Playdate"	May 4, 2020	303A	0.44
Guest star: Craig Montgomery (Candy Maker)
56	6	"Ryan's Foldin' Playdate"	May 5, 2020	303B	0.47
Guest star: Matt Hein (Origami Artist)
57	7	"Ryan's Dancin' Playdate"	May 6, 2020	304A	0.53
Guest star: Vince Horiuchi (Breakdancer)
58	8	"Ryan's Flowin' Playdate"	May 7, 2020	304B	0.57
Guest star: Terry Im (Beat Boxer: KRNFX)
59	9	"Ryan's Masked Playdate"	May 8, 2020	305A	0.67
Guest stars: Abraham Elijah Pedraja (Luchador), Robert Fimbrez (Luchador)
60	10	"Ryan's Tangled-Up Playdate"	May 11, 2020	305B	0.50
Guest star: Molly Fite (Marionettist)
61	11	"Ryan's Freestylin' Playdate"	May 12, 2020	307A	0.46
Guest stars: Caitlyn Schrepfer (Soccer Freestyler), Lisa Calderon (Soccer Freestyler)
62	12	"Ryan's Flyin' Playdate"	May 13, 2020	307B	0.43
Guest star: Katie Cook (Blue Angels Pilot)
63	13	"Ryan's Cued Up Playdate"	May 14, 2020	308A	0.43
Guest star: Matthew Webber (Trick Shot Artist)
64	14	"Ryan's Rollin' Playdate"	May 15, 2020	308B	0.46
Guest star: Faith Fox (Soap Box Racer)
65	15	"Ryan's Jurassic Playdate"	June 26, 2020	311	0.66
Guest stars: Nathan Smith (Paleontologist), Craig Robinson (Actor Comedian), Phil Moore (Veloci-rapper), Manny Haque (Dino Costume)
66	16	"Ryan's Cheerin' Playdate"	June 29, 2020	309A	0.47
Guest stars: Maria Cabande (USA Cheerleader), Kristina Sumabat (USA Cheerleader), Victoria Karnes (USA Cheerleader), Hasani Sinclair (USA Cheerleader), Dustin Velazquez (USA Cheerleader)
67	17	"Ryan's Twirlin' Playdate"	June 30, 2020	309B	0.44
Guest star: Marawa Ibrahim (Hula Hooper)
68	18	"Ryan's Sharin' Playdate"	July 1, 2020	310A	0.52
Guest stars: Stephen Sharer (YouTuber), Grace Sharer (YouTuber)
69	19	"Ryan's Storytellin' Playdate"	July 2, 2020	310B	0.49
Guest star: Shubhada Sahasrabudhe (Sand Artist)
70	20	"Ryan's Most Decorated Playdate"	July 6, 2020	313A	0.49
Guest star: Apolo Ohno (Olympic Speed Skater)
71	21	"Ryan's Gnarly Playdate"	July 7, 2020	313B	0.40
Guest star: Sky Brown (Olympian)
72	22	"Ryan's Chatterin' Playdate"	July 8, 2020	312B	0.51
Guest star: Darci Lynne (Ventriloquist)
73	23	"Ryan's Drivin' Playdate"	July 9, 2020	312A	0.48
Guest star: Joey Logano (NASCAR Driver)
74	24	"Ryan's Artsy Playdate"	August 3, 2020	315A	0.61
Guest star: Karina Garcia (Craft Queen)
75	25	"Ryan's Fiddlin' Fun Playdate"	August 4, 2020	315B	0.47
Guest star: Damien Escobar (Violinist)
76	26	"Ryan's Builder Playdate"	August 5, 2020	316A	0.47
Guest star: John Fields (Builder John)
77	27	"Ryan's Scientific Playdate"	August 6, 2020	316B	0.47
Guest star: Kate Biberdorf (Kate The Chemist)
78	28	"Ryan's Swashbucklin' Playdate"	September 18, 2020	314	0.53
Guest stars: Ethan Zohn (Survivor Champ), Pixie Gump (Sally Tremendous), Brandon Pugmire (Red Beard), Paul Galliano (Yellow Beard), Randy Backes (Weird Beard), Phil Moore (Cap'n Rappin)
79	29	"Ryan's Servin' Playdate"	November 16, 2020	306A	0.27
Guest star: Kel Mitchell (as Ed from Good Burger)
80	30	"Ryan's Smashin' Playdate"	November 17, 2020	306B	0.22
Guest stars: Siddhartha Naresh (Table Tennis Player), Nandan Naresh (Table Tennis Player)
81	31	"Ryan's Home Run Playdate"	November 18, 2020	317A	0.26
Guest star: Lisa Fernandez (Olympic Softball Pitcher)
82	32	"Ryan's Springy Playdate"	November 19, 2020	318B	0.27
Guest star: Tyler Phillips (Pogo Stick Champion)
83	33	"Ryan's Tacklin' Playdate"	January 4, 2021	320A	0.29
Guest star: Aaron Donald (Football Defensive Player)
84	34	"Ryan's Bakin' Playdate"	January 5, 2021	320B	0.34
Guest star: Andi Kirkegaard (Cookie Artist)
85	35	"Ryan's Blue Playdate"	January 6, 2021	319A	0.26
Guest star: Blue Man Group (Performers)
86	36	"Ryan's Challengin' Playdate"	January 7, 2021	319B	0.20
Guest star: Mar Mar (YouTube Star)
87	37	"Ryan's Underwater Playdate"	February 26, 2021	318	0.32
87	37	"Ryan's Ballin' Playdate"	February 26, 2021	318	0.32
Guest star: Nicole Leier (Marine Biologist), Izzy Escribano (Basketball Wiz)

=== Season 4 (2021–23) ===
No. overall	No. in season	Title	Original release date	Prod. code	U.S. viewers (millions)
Nickelodeon
88	1	"Ryan's Wild Safari Playdate"	May 3, 2021	402	0.26
88	1	"Ryan's Goal Scoring Playdate"	May 3, 2021	402	0.26
Guest star: Andrew Bullard (Fossil Rim Wildlife Center), Christie Pearce Rampone (Soccer Player)
89	2	"Ryan's Knightly Playdate"	May 4, 2021	403	0.23
89	2	"Ryan's Waddling Playdate"	May 4, 2021	403	0.23
Guest star: Jason Linere White (Voice of Knights), Frankie Lill (Aquarium of the Pacific)
90	3	"Ryan's Yo-Ho-Ho Playdate"	May 5, 2021	404	0.32
90	3	"Ryan's Full Swing Playdate"	May 5, 2021	404	0.32
Guest star: Scott Whyte (Voice of Pirate and Voice Coach), Harold Varner III (Golfer)
91	4	"Ryan's Deep Sea Playdate"	May 6, 2021	405	0.35
91	4	"Ryan's Busy Bee Playdate"	May 6, 2021	405	0.35
Guest star: Shasha Onyx (Voice of Captain Juliet the Ocean Explorer), Sophie Dodd (Beekeeper)
92	5	"Ryan's Chocolatey Playdate"	May 10, 2021	406	0.29
92	5	"Ryan's Silly Sibling Playdate"	May 10, 2021	406	0.29
Guest star: Athena Sarris (Sarris Candy), Enzo and Lucas Lopez (Lopez Family)
93	6	"Ryan's Mining Playdate"	May 11, 2021	407	0.25
93	6	"Ryan's Green Thumb Playdate"	May 11, 2021	407	0.25
Guest star: Chantelle Barry (Voice of Gold Rush Prospector Goldie), Jason Everhart (Farmer Boogie)
94	7	"Ryan's Prehistoric Playdate"	May 12, 2021	409	0.25
94	7	"Ryan's Out Of This World Playdate"	May 12, 2021	409	0.25
Guest star: Nate Smith (Natural History Museum), Julia Stockton (Voice of Nova of the Planet Craterra)
95	8	"Ryan's Giddy Up Playdate"	May 13, 2021	410	0.20
95	8	"Ryan's Perfect Slice Playdate"	May 13, 2021	410	0.20
Guest star: Scott Whyte (Voice of Pie-att the Cowboy), Michael and Nicholas Testa (Pizza Brothers)
96	9	"Ryan's Pop Rock-in' Playdate"	June 11, 2021	401	0.25
96	9	"Ryan's Magical Playdate"	June 11, 2021	401	0.25
Guest star: Dan Konopka, Damian Kulash, Tim Nordwind, and Andy Ross (OK Go), Anna DeGuzman (Magician)
97	10	"Ryan's Super Tough Playdate"	August 27, 2021	408	0.37
97	10	"Ryan's All-In-One Playdate"	August 27, 2021	408	0.37
Guest star: Ember Moon and Kurt Angle (WWE Superstars), Eric Haines (One Man Band)
98	11	"Ryan's Fizzy Playdate"	September 27, 2021	411	0.20
98	11	"Ryan's Artistic Playdate"	September 27, 2021	411	0.20
Guest star: Shalom Mitchell, Shasha Mitchell, Shiloh Mitchell, and Sinead Mitchell (Onyx Family), Rose Frankel (Potter)
99	12	"Ryan's Ice Cold Playdate"	September 28, 2021	412	0.17
99	12	"Ryan's Stylish Playdate"	September 28, 2021	412	0.17
Guest star: Ben Fernebok (Ice Cream Man), Ruben Barraza (Sneaker Designer)
100	13	"Ryan's Board Breaking Playdate"	September 29, 2021	413	0.24
100	13	"Ryan's Classical Playdate"	September 29, 2021	413	0.24
Guest star: Alexander Twu, Jacob Gonzaga, Kelsey Ha, and Stephanie Fausto (M-Team), A'zhae Turay (Piano Prodigy)
101	14	"Ryan's Slammin' Playdate"	September 30, 2021	414	0.20
101	14	"Ryan's Hairy Playdate"	September 30, 2021	414	0.20
Guest star: The Miz (WWE Superstar), Daniel Moon (Hair Designer)
102	15	"Ryan's Gemtastic Playdate"	November 1, 2021	415	0.24
102	15	"Ryan's Outdoorsy Playdate"	November 1, 2021	415	0.24
Guest star: Giselle Lomelino, Evangeline Lomelino, and Mercedes Lomelino (GEM Sisters), Yenyen Chan (Park Ranger)
103	16	"Ryan's Messy Target Playdate"	November 2, 2021	416	0.26
103	16	"Ryan's Riding Playdate"	November 2, 2021	416	0.26
Guest star: Marlin Chan (Mar Mar), Zoie Brogdon (Equestrian Rider)
104	17	"Ryan's Synchronized Playdate"	November 3, 2021	417	0.15
104	17	"Ryan's Sketching Playdate"	November 3, 2021	417	0.15
Guest stars: Celeste Acosta, Valentina Bray-Ali, Esther Goldman, Natalie McMullen, Isabella Rodarte, and Lauren Gregory (Synchronized Swim Team), Stacy Moffat (Chalk Artist)
105	18	"Ryan's Super Safe Playdate"	November 4, 2021	418	0.22
105	18	"Ryan's Poppin' Playdate"	November 4, 2021	418	0.22
Guest stars: Monique Gelineau Schwaneman (Lifeguard), Ella Kucera (Popcorn Maker)
Nick Jr.
106	19	"Ryan's Digging Playdate"	April 11, 2023	419	N/A
106	19	"Ryan's Sizzling Playdate"	April 11, 2023	419	N/A
107	20	"Ryan's Blown Up Playdate"	April 11, 2023	420	N/A
107	20	"Ryan's Culinary Playdate"	April 11, 2023	420	N/A
108	21	"Ryan's Slapshot Playdate"	April 12, 2023	421	N/A
108	21	"Ryan's Scooting Playdate"	April 12, 2023	421	N/A
109	22	"Ryan's Vlogging Playdate"	April 12, 2023	422	N/A
109	22	"Ryan's Aerodynamic Playdate"	April 12, 2023	422	N/A
110	23	"Ryan's Street Scaling Playdate"	April 13, 2023	423	N/A
110	23	"Ryan's Doubles Playdate"	April 13, 2023	423	N/A
111	24	"Ryan's Aquatic Playdate"	April 13, 2023	424	N/A
111	24	"Ryan's Royal Playdate"	April 13, 2023	424	N/A
112	25	"Ryan's Tubular Playdate"	April 14, 2023	425	N/A
112	25	"Ryan's Super Tall Playdate"	April 14, 2023	425	N/A
113	26	"Ryan's Chilly Playdate"	April 14, 2023	426	N/A
113	26	"Ryan's Zoological Playdate"	April 14, 2023	426	N/A
114	27	"Ryan's Target Hitting Playdate"	April 15, 2023	427	N/A
114	27	"Ryan's Double Jump Playdate"	April 15, 2023	427	N/A
115	28	"Ryan's Splashing Playdate"	April 15, 2023	428	N/A
115	28	"Ryan's Two Wheeling Playdate"	April 15, 2023	428	N/A
116	29	"Ryan's Free Falling Playdate"	April 16, 2023	429	N/A
116	29	"Ryan's Ice Sweeping Playdate"	April 16, 2023	429	N/A
117	30	"Ryan's Heavy Lifting Playdate"	April 16, 2023	430	N/A
117	30	"Ryan's Straight Steppin' Playdate"	April 16, 2023	430	N/A

== Special (2020) ==
Title	Original release date	Prod. code	U.S. viewers (millions)
"Ryan's Christmas Time Special!"	December 4, 2020	999	0.40
