= Daniel LaBelle =

American YouTuber (born 1987)

- Born: August 22, 1987 (age 38); Kenosha, Wisconsin
- Occupation: YouTuber

YouTube information
- Channel: Daniel LaBelle
- Years active: 2009–present
- Genre: Comedy
- Subscribers: 35.5 million
- Views: 23.2 billion
- Last updated: September 26, 2025

Daniel LaBelle (born August 22, 1987) is an American YouTuber, media personality, and photographer. He is best known for his short-form physical comedy skits.

== Early life ==
Daniel LaBelle was born in Kenosha, Wisconsin. He ran track in college.

LaBelle graduated from John Brown University in 2010 with a bachelor's degree in digital media and started his business called Daniel LaBelle Photography in 2011.

== Career ==
He started his YouTube channel in 2009, and he first posted short-form comedy videos. Labelle started gaining attention in early 2020, when the COVID-19 pandemic put his photography career on hold, so he began experimenting with posting comical videos. In July 2021, he started gaining popularity through YouTube Shorts.

As of September 2025, LaBelle has over 75 million followers across his eponymous social media accounts and has received praise for his athleticism.

=== Media ===
In 2020, LaBelle joined TikTok to promote his photography business. He went viral when he posted a video portraying a child posing for a picture, which garnered over a million views in a day. He found success in these types of videos and abandoned his photography business to pursue content creation full-time. In 2021, LaBelle posted a short portraying how animals would run if they were human. LaBelle also collaborated with violinist Rob Landes to make a short portraying how life would be with a soundtrack. One of LaBelle's videos titled If Cleaning Was a Timed Sport. Part 2 hit the charts, being the most viewed video on YouTube, with 1.6 billion views. In 2023, LaBelle was one of the eight creators who partnered up with PocketWatch.

On February 1, 2025, a miniseries on Hulu titled Daniel LaBelle: Full Body Funny was released.

On March 11, 2025, LaBelle challenged YouTuber iShowSpeed to an 80-meter race. In June, Watkins accepted the challenge, to which he won. LaBelle requested a rematch, only to lose once more.

Time placed Labelle in the Top 100 Time Creators of 2025.

== See also ==
- List of YouTubers
