= Ryan's World the Movie: Titan Universe Adventure =

2024 American superhero comedy film

- Theatrical release poster
- Directed by: Albie Hecht
- Screenplay by: Rose Frankel
- Story by: Rose Frankel; Shion Kaji
- Based on: Ryan's World
- Produced by: Shion Kaji; Loann Kaji
- Starring: Ryan Kaji; Emma Kaji; Kate Kaji; Evangeline Lomelino; Shion Kaji; Loann Kaji; Dan Rhodes
- Cinematography: Brandon Mastrippolito
- Edited by: Jeff Murphy
- Music by: Guy Moon
- Production companies: Sunlight Entertainment; PocketWatch
- Distributed by: Falling Forward Films
- Release dates: April 6, 2024 (CIFF); August 16, 2024 (United States)
- Running time: 80 minutes
- Country: United States
- Language: English
- Budget: c.$10 million
- Box office: $624,429

Ryan's World the Movie: Titan Universe Adventure is a 2024 American live-action/animated superhero comedy film based on the YouTube channel Ryan's World, co-produced by Loann Kaji and Shion Kaji, Chris M. Williams as executive producer, directed by Albie Hecht (in his directorial debut), and written by Rose Frankel. It stars Ryan Kaji, Emma Kaji, Kate Kaji, Shion Kaji, and Loann Kaji as the titular YouTube channel family alongside Evangeline Lomelino and Dan Rhodes. In the film, Ryan jumps into a mystical superhero comic book to save his younger sisters, Emma and Kate.

The film premiered at the Cleveland International Film Festival on April 6, 2024, and was released in theaters in the United States on August 16, 2024. It received negative reviews from critics and grossed $624,429 on an estimated $10 million budget.

== Plot ==
Ryan performs a magic trick with fellow YouTuber Dan Rhodes in a livestream. However, he finds out that his sisters Emma and Kate stole some magic goo he needed for the trick. After confronting his sisters for vandalizing his items, Ryan and his friend Aiden head to Dabgib Comics, where after doing a favor for Clark, the store's owner, they both get access to a secret room in the store. There, Ryan finds a comic book plagiarizing his work, which he steals. Ryan returns home, where he sees that Emma and Kate have vandalized another of his toys. He threatens to never play with his sisters ever again and storms away. Emma and Kate then notice the comic book starting to come to life, and upon opening the book, they are told by Dark Titan, who is disguised as a unicorn, to enter the comic book so they can impress Ryan. When Ryan attempts to apologize to his sisters, he finds out that they have entered the comic book, so he leaves Aiden behind and enters the comic book world to save his sisters.

Upon entering the Titan Universe, Ryan transforms into the animated superhero, Red Titan, gaining superpowers that he uses to fight off a hoard of robots, who try and capture him. However, a bat named Stella saves Ryan, and the two team up to save Emma, Kate, and the Titan Universe. Meanwhile, Emma and Kate are now held captive by Dark Titan, locked away in a dungeon with Combo Panda and Alpha Lexa, two superheroes from the Titan Universe. Ryan encounters and defeats Dark Titan, allowing everyone held captive in the dungeon to escape. Emma and Kate, who have also gained superpowers, use their telepathy to devise a plan and help out Ryan, by tricking Dark Titan into destroying his lair and getting defeated in the process. After escaping, Ryan exclaims that Emma and Kate are too young to fight the "Big Bad", the true villain of the Titan Universe, and advises them to not join him. Meanwhile, Aiden tries to prevent Shion from realizing that his children are inside the comic book.

A screenshot of multiple characters in the film. From left to right: Combo Panda, Kate, Ryan, Emma, and Alpha Lexa.

It is revealed that Big Bad is planning to cause a volcanic eruption that will destroy the Titan Universe by putting Mentos into lava. The volcano slowly starts to erupt, becoming an obstacle for Ryan and his team. After being saved by Ryan, Emma and Kate tell him that they are being underestimated, only for everyone to be captured by Big Bad and his henchmen. At his lair, Big Bad explains his plot to destroy the Titan Universe and kill the heroes in the process. Big Bad reveals that he is actually Clark, and that he made the comic book himself to kill Ryan, as Clark's little sister, Mia, stopped playing with him in favor of watching Ryan's videos. As Ryan and Big Bad battle each other, Aiden retrieves some of Ryan's toys and sends them to the Titan Universe, bringing them to life and serving as backup for Ryan. After defeating Big Bad, Ryan and his sisters say goodbye to the other heroes as they leave the Titan Universe. Back in the real world, they completely hide their adventure from their parents and begin to have fun outside.

== Cast ==
=== Live-action cast ===
- Ryan Kaji as himself
- Emma Kaji as herself
- Kate Kaji as herself
- Shion Kaji as himself
- Loann Kaji as herself
- Evangeline Lomelino as Aiden
- Jack Reid as Clark/Big Bad
- Dan Rhodes as himself

Additionally, YouTube channels Toys and Colors, K-City and Hungry Fam make cameos in the beginning of the film, where they watch Ryan's livestream unfold, while Larry Herrera and Sky Williams play Ryan's World fans.

=== Voice cast ===
- Ryan Kaji as Red Titan
- Bradley William Smith as Combo Panda and Robo Combo
- Julia Stockton as Alpha Lexa and Gus
- Scott Whyte as Dark Titan and Packrat
- Brianna Jaynes as Emma and Kate (animated)
- Jack Reid as Big Bad (animated)
- Jose David Ramos as Peck and Gil
- Clare Loughran as Stella

== Production ==
The film was first announced on September 22, 2023, with Ryan Kaji, Evangeline Lomelino, Dan Rhodes and Stella Wallace revealed to have been cast in the film, with Rose Frankel writing the screenplay. The animation for the film was provided by Shin-Ei Animation in Japan.

== Release ==
Ryan's World the Movie: Titan Universe Adventure was released in over 2,100 theaters across the United States on August 16, 2024, sharing its release date with Alien: Romulus. The film previously premiered at the Cleveland International Film Festival on April 6, 2024, and was screened at the Bentonville Film Festival on June 13.

== Music ==
On July 15, 2024, it was announced that Republic Records would release a soundtrack album for the film on August 16, 2024. A cappella group Pentatonix released a cover of Imagine Dragons' "Thunder" on July 12, 2024, which is featured as the soundtrack's lead single.

This film also marks Guy Moon's final film score before his passing two years after the release of the film.

== Reception ==
=== Box office ===
On August 16, 2024, Ryan's World the Movie: Titan Universe Adventure was released along with Alien: Romulus, and grossed $613,001 across 1,285 theaters in the United States and Canada; the number of theaters screening the film dropped to 256 on August 23 and then 10 on August 30, before finally completing its theatrical run on September 5. It ranked 35th at the North American box office for August 2024. Additionally, it grossed $11,428 across 85 theaters in the United Kingdom, and made an overall worldwide total of $624,429.

=== Critical response ===
Writing for Common Sense Media, Sandie Angulo Chen stated: "This is ultimately an underwhelming influencer movie that's aimed at the YouTuber's huge base of toy-loving fans but has little to offer anyone else."

Carla Hay of Culture Mix asserted, "This cinematic junk is what happens when underage YouTube stars with no acting talent have parents who pay for the family to star in a vanity movie motivated by greed. It's not the kid's fault. [...] You already know how this movie is going to end."
