= Levitating (song) =

2020 single by Dua Lipa

Single by Dua Lipa

from the album Future Nostalgia
- Released: 1 October 2020
- Recorded: 28 August 2018
- Studio: Sarm (London, United Kingdom); the Bunker at 13; Sarm Music Village (London, United Kingdom); Modulator Music (Toronto, Canada)
- Genre: Electro-disco; nu-disco; pop-funk; space rock
- Length: 3:23
- Label: Warner
- Songwriters: Dua Lipa; Clarence Coffee Jr.; Sarah Hudson; Stephen Kozmeniuk; DaBaby (Note: Remix version)
- Producers: Stephen Kozmeniuk; Stuart Price

Dua Lipa singles chronology
"Levitating" (The Blessed Madonna remix) (2020)	"Levitating" (2020)	"Fever" (2020)

Music videos
- "Levitating" on YouTube; "Levitating" (Animated version) on YouTube

"Levitating" is a song by English singer Dua Lipa from her second studio album, Future Nostalgia (2020). The song was written by Lipa, Clarence Coffee Jr., Sarah Hudson, and Koz, who produced the song with Stuart Price, and stemmed from a Roland VP-330 synthesiser sample played by Koz. The song is an electro-disco and nu-disco track with several disco tropes. It incorporates elements of dance-pop, pop-funk, power pop and space rock, as well as 1970s, 1980s and 1990s pop and R&B styles. The lyrics describe the idea of "levitating" when falling in love, with several outer space references. It was crowned as the biggest female lead song of the 21st century by Billboard and as the ninth-biggest song overall in this century, as of 2025.

A remix of "Levitating" by American DJ the Blessed Madonna featuring Madonna and Missy Elliott was released for digital download and streaming on 13 August 2020 as the lead single from Lipa and the Blessed Madonna's remix album Club Future Nostalgia (2020). It was categorised as an EDM, electro-disco, electro house, future bass, and techno track, with a throwback disco and trance vibe, and an increased tempo from the original. A second remix featuring American rapper DaBaby was released for the same formats on 1 October 2020 as the fifth single of Future Nostalgia, appearing on the bonus edition of the album. The remix impacted contemporary hit radio formats in the United States on 6 October 2020, serving as the album's third single in the country. The remix has the same production used in the original, with DaBaby adding a pop rap verse and intro.

"Levitating" reached number 5 on the UK Singles Chart and number 2 on the US Billboard Hot 100, becoming Lipa's seventh top-five single in the UK and second in the US. It also achieved top-five charting in many countries including Australia, Canada, India, Ireland, and New Zealand. Despite not reaching number 1 in the United States, "Levitating" was named the top song on the 2021 year-end chart, becoming the fourth single to accomplish this feat and the first single to do so since Lifehouse's "Hanging by a Moment" in 2001. It set new records as the song by a female artist with the most weeks spent in the Top 10 and the longest-charting non-holiday song by a female artist on the Billboard Hot 100, spending forty-one weeks in the Top 10 and seventy-seven weeks on the chart overall. It ranks within the Top 40 on the list of the greatest Hot 100 hits of all time. In 2023, the song was certified Diamond by the Recording Industry Association of America (RIAA). On the Billboard Global 200, it peaked at number 2 and was named the top song on the 2021 year-end chart. The song was awarded a triple Platinum certification in the United Kingdom by the British Phonographic Industry (BPI).

"Levitating" was promoted with the release of two music videos, one for each of its respective remixes. The Will Hooper-directed music video for the Blessed Madonna's remix was filmed in London and Atlanta and has a theme of "love conquers all". It sees many people under the influence of a mysterious planet and being obsessed with a maze-like symbol. The DaBaby remix received a music video that was directed by Warren Fu and created in partnership with social media platform TikTok. The video is centred around Lipa and DaBaby dancing in an art deco-styled elevator, with many TikTok users in the cast. Lipa promoted the single with live performances on The Graham Norton Show, at the American Music Awards of 2020, and on Saturday Night Live.

== Background ==
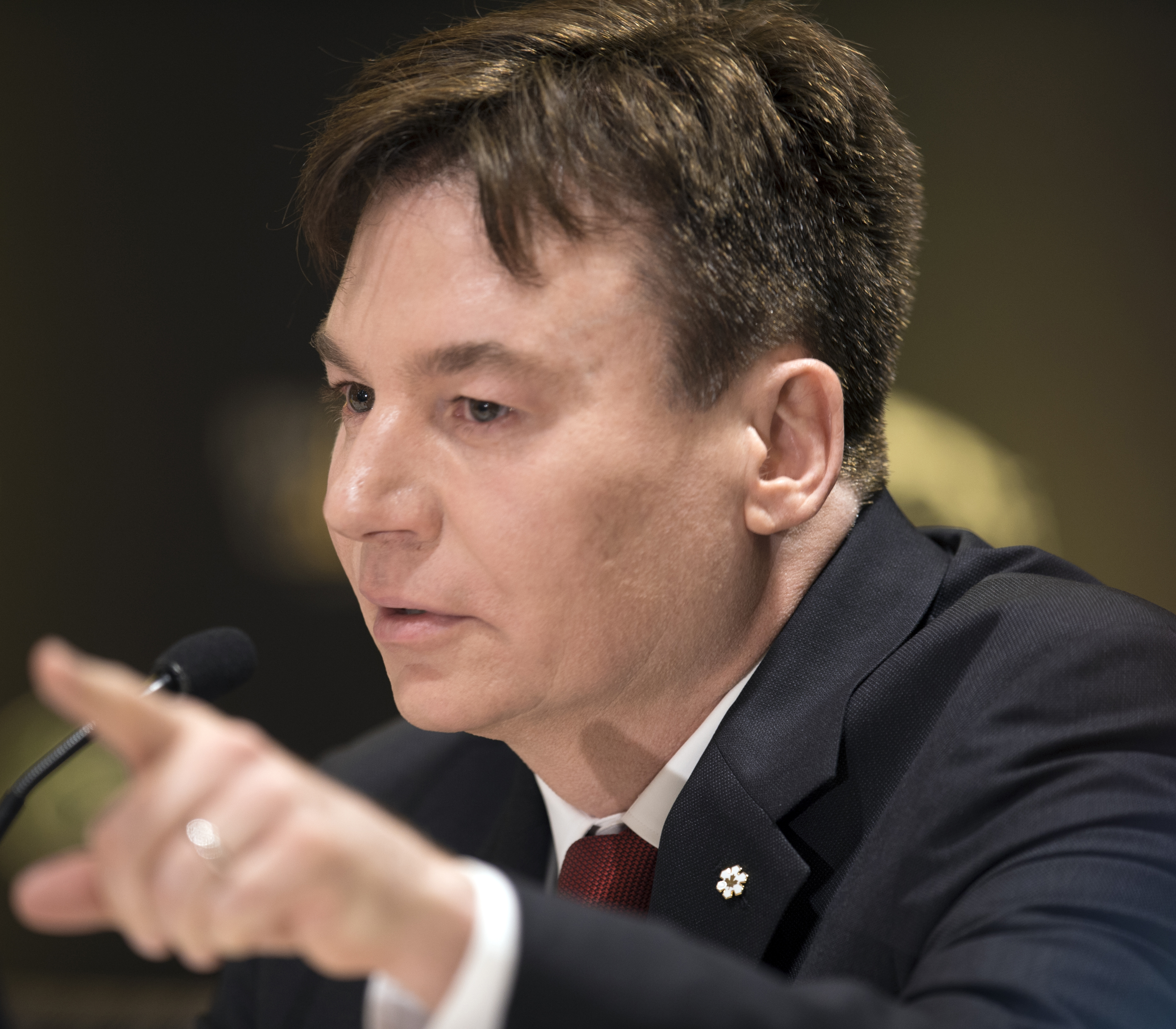
Canadian actor Mike Myers and his Austin Powers films provided inspiration for "Levitating".

After figuring out the title of her second studio album, Future Nostalgia, Dua Lipa began working backwards, figuring out the sound she desired. Shortly after, "Levitating" was written, which is the first track recorded that appears on the album's final track listing. The song was written by Lipa with her longtime collaborators Clarence Coffee Jr. of The Monsters & Strangerz, Sarah Hudson and Stephen Kozmeniuk, the latter of which also handled the production. Before going into the studio, Kozmeniuk spent a few weeks coming up with ideas to play in the studio, eventually thinking it would be cool to create a "slinky disco track." Lipa sent him some notes and stuff that she was inspired by, which became the idea of blending old with new. Kozmeniuk thought the best way to create this idea was to use old instruments, one of which was a Roland VP-330 synthesizer, which he had been looking for, for seven to eight years. After shipping the synthesizer from Tokyo to Toronto, he immediately plugged it in and began playing. The first thing he played, which he described as a "synthetic choir sound", later turned into the synth line from the song. He looped the sound and began building a song around it, including creating an analog string sound, also using the Roland VP-330.

"Levitating" was written and recorded in a one-day studio session at Sarm West Studios in Notting Hill, London between the four writers on 28 August 2018. They started the session by Hudson doing a Tarot card reading in order for the writers to open up about what was happening in their lives. Lipa recalled it "changing the energy in the room." Kozmeniuk then began playing some tracks he had created with Lipa in mind. "Levitating" was one of the first tracks he played, which the collaborators all agreed that it would be the one to write onto. Lipa took out the voice memos app on her phone and began leading the song by singing a melody, making it up on the way with Coffee later elevating it. They had the visuals of being in an Austin Powers movie, with Mike Myers doing a random dance to the song, which helped give them a mood while writing the lyrics. The session ended up with the collaborators ordering doughnuts and 'levitating' from the sugar rush. They immediately began writing after that, with a good feeling going into it. They decided to include the "sugarboo" lyric as an ode to their friendship as it was something they called one another as a joke. Lipa also decided to add a rap in order to get her British side across, because she often gets mistaken from where she is actually from.

Lipa began by recording the lead vocals, and later some backing vocals and vocals with all the collaborators. They would create different personas with different vocals every time they recorded them. Lipa recalled that she and her co-writers were dancing all through making the song, even if they were experiencing writer's block or working on the production. After finishing the song, Lipa enlisted the help of Stuart Price for some additional production. He brought more "bounce" to the song and helped with the bass groove. He also incorporated a high drone synth as a disco trope, and a string part in the pre-chorus. Koz later also enlisted the help of Bosko "Electrospit" Kante to play a talk box. "Levitating" helped dictate what the rest of Future Nostalgia would sound like and where Lipa thought everything made sense, where she had both the "future" and "nostalgia" elements. She called it the "starting point" of the album.

== Music and lyrics ==
"Levitating" is an electro-disco, nu-disco, pop-funk and space rock song, with dance-pop and power pop elements. The song incorporates music styles from the 1970s, 1980s, and 1990s pop and R&B. Constructed in verse–chorus form, the song runs for 3 minutes and 23 seconds and is composed in 4/4 time and the key of B minor, with a tempo of 103 beats per minute and a chord progression of Bm^{7}—F♯m^{7}—Em^{7}. It is built around a wonky synth hook, with 1990s choruses and several campy disco tropes. The rest of the production consists of funky synth disco beats, a "squelchy" bass, "rubbery" basslines, syncopated handclaps, nu-disco rhythms, "wonky" and "bizarre" synths, an EDM groove, funky guitars, talk box vocals, a "hypnotic" synth line and disco strings. The bass, guitars, and talk box give off a disco-funk feeling. Following the first chorus, the instruments are stripped back. On his remix, DaBaby adds a new pop rap verse and intro, over the original's production, with him serving as an additional writer on the track.

"Levitating"
A 19-second sample of the middle eight of the original version of "Levitating", where Lipa performs a rap influenced by Blondie.

Lipa's vocals range from F♯_{3} to B_{4}. The middle eight includes a Blondie-influenced rap, where Lipa exerts her British accent, before she performs an a cappella ahead of the final chorus. "Levitating" has many outer space references, using an exaggerated metaphor of love as a spaceship to transmit radiant euphoria and happiness. Lyrically, the song sees Lipa exposing her feelings for a significant other and singing about moments with them in which she is her best self. For NME, Rhian Daly stated she sings about "a love 'written in the stars'", while 411Mania's David Hayter, labelled it an "intergalactic ode to orgasms". The song received many comparisons to the works of Chic, Daft Punk, Debbie Harry, the Jackson 5 ("Blame It on the Boogie", 1978), Kylie Minogue, Moloko, Kate Nash, Outkast ("Rosa Parks", 1998), Katy Perry, the Spice Girls, Tinie Tempah ("Pass Out", 2010), the Weeknd (Starboy, 2016), and Super Mario 64 (1996) sound effects.

It had to be fun and bubbly but with lyrics that felt really smart. This is about me exploring happy songs and doing something that's not 'dance crying'. It's about having fun and meeting someone and falling in love and thinking, 'You've probably met me at the perfect time, let's just go for it.' It's the feeling when love makes you feel like you're levitating. It's otherworldly. Things get quite Daft Punk-y here, but it's playful.

— Lipa on "Levitating".

== Release and promotion ==
"Levitating" was released on 27 March 2020 as the fifth track on Lipa's second studio album, Future Nostalgia. In August 2020, Lipa confirmed that the song would serve as the album's fifth official single. It was promoted to Italian and British contemporary hit radio formats on 13 August and 23 September 2020, as a promotional single. On 25 September 2020, DaBaby confirmed in an interview with Capital FM that he had a collaboration with Lipa coming out soon. Later that day, Lipa announced that a remix of "Levitating" featuring DaBaby would be released a week later. The remix's cover art was shot by Joseph Ford. It premiered on 1 October 2020, being released for digital download and streaming. The remix was later added to the three editions of Future Nostalgia: the bonus edition which was released alongside the song, the digital edition released on 29 October 2020, and the 20 November 2020-released French CD edition.

The remix was serviced to contemporary hit radio formats in the United States on 6 October 2020, serving as the album's third single in the country. It was also serviced to contemporary hit radio formats in Italy and the United Kingdom on 2 and 9 October 2020, respectively. The original was serviced to adult contemporary radio formats in the United Kingdom on 17 October 2020. The remix was also scheduled to be serviced to adult contemporary radio formats in the US on 19 October 2020, but was ultimately replaced with the original. Due to its music video partnership with TikTok, the app launched a worldwide advertising campaign with promotion on several digital and social media channels, as well as New York City's Times Square and prominent sites in cities across Europe. The app also launched the #Levitating challenge, where Lipa invited fans to use TikTok's slow-motion feature to show off their levitating skills. The song was promoted with an Instagram filter on the app. Lipa and Koz did an interview about the creation of the song on music podcast Song Exploder's 194th episode, released on 7 October 2020. It was also included in Morrisons' 2020 Christmas TV Ad. The song was used during the 46th People's Choice Awards on 15 November 2020. The song was included in a promotional video for the 2020–21 NBA season made by NBA on TNT. Joe Biden and Kamala Harris used it in a playlist supporting their inauguration.

A remix of the track by KUU was released on 20 November 2020. It is a four on the floor-styled song with a simple and hypnotic sound design that makes use of tropical synths, Balearic beats, a rolling bassline, and funky piano chords, all layered with Lipa's vocals.

Over the 2020–21 Premier League season, a video clip of Manchester City manager Pep Guardiola dancing, with part of the track overlaid on it, surfaced on Twitter. The clip was later posted by Manchester City's official Twitter account on 4 February 2021 and again on 7 February 2021 following Manchester City's 4–1 victory over Liverpool, which was their first victory at Anfield in 18 years.

In February 2021 after Lipa was honoured as a Time 100 Next "emerging leader", she performed a stripped-down version of "Levitating" with a live ensemble including Panic at the Disco bassist Nicole Row.

== Critical reception ==
In September 2020, Callie Ahlgrim of Business Insider viewed "Levitating" as Future Nostalgia's "most enchanting track" and one of Lipa's "best ever" songs. She went on to praise it for getting better with every listen and her use of pet names, as well as calling the song "sugary," "upbeat," and "unabashed." Bailey Slater of Wonderland called it a "roller disco bop" and thought that it would go viral on TikTok. Gabbie Nirenburg of No Ripcord praised the track's blend of disco and futuristic while also calling the lyrics "clever." In his review for God Is in the TV, Jonathan Wright commended the song for being a "classy piece of brilliantly-timed disco escapism." The Line of Best Fit's Chris Taylor viewed it as "peak disco-revivalism" and thought it was meant for a roller disco.

In The Guardian, Laura Snapes stated that "Levitating" "blooms like a row of tropical flowers." For Crack Magazine, Michael Cragg noted its French bloghouse hallmarks, previously explored on "Don't Start Now". DIY's Elly Watson labelled the song "dancefloor-ready," while Mike Nied of Idolator named it multiple titles, including a "starry-eyed love song," a "straight up sugar rush," an "intergalactic adventure," and "breezy and feel-good." For Billboard, Bianca Gracie labelled it a "summery jam" and recommended playing it on a Miami road trip. Nick Smith of musicOMH stated that the song comes off as "a funky caffeine and sugar overdose." In Slant Magazine, Sal Cinquemani labelled it a "feel-good earworm." For Nylon, Shaad D'Souza criticized the song for its lack of longevity.

For Vinyl Chapters, Jamie Parmenter praised Lipa's rap in the middle eight, writing one has the "pleasure of hearing the singer's English accent" and it "shows the confidence she has in her own talent." In The Daily Telegraph, Neil McCormick also complimented Lipa's accent in that rap, and praised the "transatlantic-friendly" sound of "Levitating". Conrad Duncan of Under the Radar criticised the rap, calling it a "bafflingly unnecessary misfire," while also noting its aim for Kurtis Blow. The Arts Desk's Joe Muggs also criticised the rap, writing it "falls short." Vulture's Craig Jenkins praised Lipa's vocal delivery for merging elements of anxiety and sexual tension, while also naming the lyrics "flurries of pickup lines." For The Young Folks, Ryan Feyre called the song a high point on Future Nostalgia and wrote that it is "filled with raw adrenaline."

Critics also praised DaBaby parts in his respective remix. Heran Mamo of Billboard noted DaBaby asserting attitude and stated he brings the song to "new heights." For Idolator, Mike Wass stated the remix "works well enough" with the original's production, and viewed DaBaby's verse as "surprisingly sweet." Paper's Shaad D'Souza thought that the remix presented DaBaby a chance to "shake up his flow", while also labelling it "inspired." Revolt's Regina Cho also commented on DaBaby's flow, stating it matches the song's "groovy bounce." Of HotNewHipHop, Alexander Cole praised DaBaby for fitting perfectly with the track's "undeniable groove," while also stating he is a "nice addition" to the song. In Consequence of Sound, Ben Kaye challenged that it is not a remix due to its use of the original's production.

== Commercial performance ==
Following the release of Future Nostalgia, "Levitating" found success as an album track throughout Europe, debuting at number 97 in Greece, 29 in Hungary, 41 in Lithuania, 83 in Portugal, 62 in Slovakia, and 71 in Spain. In France, the song debuted at number 127 before peaking at number 24 several months later. It was also the singer's longest-charting song, staying 109 weeks in the French Singles Chart, before being surpassed by "Cold Heart (Pnau Remix)" with Elton John, which stayed on the chart for 140 weeks and peaked at number 9.

In the United Kingdom, the song was the most streamed album track on video services. It debuted at number 51 on the UK Official Audio Streaming Chart dated 3 April 2020. Following the release of the Blessed Madonna's remix, the original version debuted at number 39 on the UK Singles Chart dated 21 August 2020. It lasted five weeks on the chart, before re-entering at number 30 on the chart dated 9 October 2020, following the release of the DaBaby remix. The song peaked at number 5 on the chart, becoming Lipa's tenth UK Top 10 single. In November 2020, the song reached the summit of the UK Radio Airplay Chart. In May 2026, it was awarded a five-times Platinum certification from the British Phonographic Industry (BPI) for track-equivalent sales of 3,000,000 units. It has also reached number 4 and 13 respectively on the Irish Singles Chart and Scottish Singles Chart respectively.

"Levitating" reached the summit of the chart in Bulgaria. On Australia's ARIA Singles Chart dated 26 October 2020, the original began being credited as the Blessed Madonna's remix was credited before then, and peaked at number 4. In New Zealand, the original version debuted at number 6 on the NZ Hot Singles Chart dated 6 April 2020, and the 12 October 2020 chart saw DaBaby's remix debuting at number 14. On the NZ Top 40 Singles Chart dated 19 October 2020, the original version debuted at number 36, and the DaBaby Remix was later credited, reaching a peak of number 5. The song was awarded 9× platinum certification in the country by Recorded Music NZ for track-equivalent sales of 270,000 units.

DaBaby's remix of "Levitating" debuted at number 51 on the Billboard Global 200 chart dated 17 October 2020, and has peaked at number 2 on the chart. It has reached number 1 on the Canadian Hot 100, becoming Lipa's first and DaBaby's second number-one single in Canada. It topped the chart for three nonconsecutive weeks. "Levitating" became Lipa's biggest US chart hit. It debuted at number 73 on the Billboard Hot 100 chart dated 17 October 2020. On the chart dated 9 January 2021, it reached the chart's tenth position, becoming Lipa's third Top 10 single following "Don't Start Now" and "New Rules" (2017). It peaked at number 2 on the chart (behind Silk Sonic's "Leave the Door Open"), tying "Don't Start Now" as Lipa's highest-charting US song, and it is Lipa's longest-running Top 10 hit. On the issue dated 4 September 2021, in its thirty-fourth week in the Top 10, "Levitating" surpassed "Girls Like You" by Maroon 5 featuring Cardi B to become the longest-running Top 10 single by a female artist. It has since become the second song to spend a total of forty weeks in the Top 10, as of the week ending 30 October 2021, after "Blinding Lights" by the Weeknd. On the issue dated 19 March 2022, in its 70th week on the chart, "Levitating" surpassed "How Do I Live" by LeAnn Rimes as the longest-charting hit on the Hot 100 by a female artist. The record was subsequently broken in 2025 by Mariah Carey's "All I Want for Christmas Is You". The DaBaby remix of "Levitating" topped both the US Mainstream Top 40 chart, which monitors pop radio stations, and the US Adult Top 40, which monitors hot adult contemporary radio formats. It also reached number 1 on the Radio Songs chart after a thirty-seven-week climb, the longest climb to the top spot in the chart's thirty-year history, surpassing the thirty-five-week climb set by "I Hope" by Gabby Barrett in October 2020. In December 2021, the solo version of "Levitating" was named the best-performing single of the year on the Hot 100, becoming only the fourth single to achieve this without topping the weekly chart (after "Wooly Bully" by Sam the Sham and the Pharaohs in 1965, "Breathe" by Faith Hill in 2000, and "Hanging by a Moment" by Lifehouse in 2001) and the first single by a female solo artist to top the year-end chart since 2011.

== Music video ==
=== Background and release ===
From 25 August 2020 to 31 August 2020, Lipa held a contest on social media platform TikTok for fans to create visualisers for "Levitating", including dance, animation, and makeup, for a chance to be featured in the video, later revealed to be the video for the remix featuring DaBaby. The challenge garnered 300,000,000 views and 150,000 video submissions, of which 16 creators were invited to be a part of the video. Three creators, Andrew Wilson, Ramana Borba, and Rikki Sandhu, helped as part of the crew. They animated Lipa's cosmic dance floor, helped with some of the dance routines, and designed the cosmic makeup on Lipa's dancers, respectively. For the video, Lipa had a mood board consisting of Austin Powers, 1960s futurism and surrealism, Studio 54 and disco, thinking that "Levitating" was the perfect song to encapsulate these ideas.

The music video was directed by American director Warren Fu, and took over 16 1/2 hours to shoot, with stylist Lorenzo Posocco being on Zoom for over 17 hours during it. While filming, Lipa quickly decided that she did not like her look moments before going on camera, and within five minutes hairstylist Chris Appleton flipped her wig and gave her a whole new look. TikTok users Dexter Mayfield and Olivia Wong prepared for being on camera by vibing off everyone's energy and staying calm, respectively. DaBaby was originally supposed to be dressed as an astronaut for his shots, but ultimately did not due to the video's "flow", so he could just party. The visual premiered on YouTube at 13:00 BST (12:00 UTC) on 2 October 2020. It was proceeded by the release of two teasers on TikTok, in which Lipa invites users to "The Levitating Experience" that takes one to an "intergalactic dance floor;" she also warns viewers not to mess with the system and informs them about how to get there, among other items.

An alternate animated music video was released on 13 September 2021, using the original version of the song without DaBaby. The music video was produced by Japanese animation group NOSTALOOK, in retro 1980s-1990s Japanese anime style, similar to Sailor Moon and Creamy Mami.

=== Synopsis ===
Lipa and DaBaby dance in an art deco-styled elevator in the music video

The music video opens with Lipa lying on the hood of a Plymouth Barracuda, watching the stars in the night sky. She sports blonde hair and glittering eye makeup, and wears a Misbhv sheer top, cargo trousers, and Puma trainers as well as a "sugarboo" necklace which Hudson and Coffee gave her for her birthday. A portal of white light then appears out of nowhere, and Lipa's clothes change into a custom Atelier Versace mini dress made out of Swarovski crystal mesh; she worked closely with the Versace to create a "disco dream" dress. Lipa's "sugarboo" necklace then levitates off her neck, and she goes up materializing stairs into the portal. The portal closes and shoots up into the night sky, transporting Lipa to a futuristic, art deco, disco and The Great Gatsby-themed elevator, which has gold trimming and the TikTok logo as its arrow indicating what floor they are on. She dances in the elevator, accompanied by two girls dressed as bellhops.

Shortly after, the elevator reads "Approaching KRK-91", a reference to DaBaby's real name, Kirk, and his birth year, 1991. One of the bellhop girls then goes to the door, and swipes up on a screen next to it to an outline of DaBaby; she presses a button under it. The door opens and DaBaby enters the elevator, wearing a knitted multicolour monogram flower crewneck outfit from Louis Vuitton's FW20 collection, alongside iced jewels and a chain that says "Kirk". DaBaby raps to the camera as Lipa casually dances behind him, where she blows a kiss and puts her arm around DaBaby. The elevator then reaches "Roller World", where girls on roller skates enter the elevator, in 1970s-inspired attire. They all dance together with large moves, and the elevator shines cherry red lights ever so often. The elevator reaches its final stop, and one of the bellhop girls swipes the screen to release. One of the passengers is launched into space before the dancers begin to appear dancing on a Milky Way-like illuminated circular belt. Lipa is seen dancing on a platform in the middle of the belt, sporting bangs, and wearing a Mugler dress with elbow-length gloves from Casey Cadwallader's autumn/winter 2020 show.

=== Reception ===
The staff of DIY labelled the "Levitating" music video "glitzy and glam", and noted its Studio 54 aesthetic. For the Gay Times, Sam Damshenas praised Lipa's "intergalactic disco diva" role. Katrina Rees of CelebMix named the video "futuristic," while Idolator's Mike Wass pointed out its blockbuster production. In Vogue, Susan Devaney compared Lipa's custom Versace dress to that of previous outfits worn by Paris Hilton and Kendall Jenner. The magazine later placed the video among the "Most-Stylish Music Videos of 2020" list. Writing for Billboard, Heran Mamo called the video "luxe," while Hypebeast's Clara Malley viewed it as "a Great Gatsby-meets-disco twist." In Rolling Stone, Claire Shaffer noted the visual's Milky Way themes and imagery.

On 5 April 2022, the music video garnered 500 million views on YouTube. As of October 2025, it has received a billion views, making it Lipa's second music video to achieve this milestone.

== Controversies ==
=== DaBaby controversy ===
On 25 July 2021, DaBaby performed at Rolling Loud, in which he made controversial comments, saying, "If you didn't show up today with HIV, AIDS, or any of them deadly sexually transmitted diseases that'll make you die in two to three weeks, then put your cellphone lighter up." His remarks drew condemnation, and DaBaby responded to the allegations with "What me and my fans do at the live show, it don't concern you niggas on the internet, or you bitter bitches on the internet." This caused Lipa's fans to ask that DaBaby be removed from the remix of "Levitating". Many wanted him replaced with Megan Thee Stallion; subsequently a mashup of "Levitating" and Megan's verse from "Fkn Around" (2020) went viral. On 27 July 2021, Lipa took to her Instagram story to denounce DaBaby's remarks. Other celebrities such as Elton John would also express their condemnations towards DaBaby.

The controversy later prompted the removal of the "Levitating" remix across multiple radio stations and Apple Music playlists in various countries. It was simultaneously replaced with the original solo version of the song, which was initially released in March 2020 as part of the album. Billboard later reported that while US radio audience impressions for all versions of the song combined was only down 1% for the tracking week of 23 to 29 July 2021, the percentage of the song's radio plays being the DaBaby remix declined following his remarks (dropping from 71% of all radio plays on 25 July to 59% on 29 July, the last day of the tracking week). On the chart issue dated 28 August 2021, DaBaby's credit was removed on the Billboard Hot 100 as the chart's rules state that the version of the song that contributes to the greatest share of a song's performance on the chart is the one that is credited on the chart, indicating that the original solo version of the song had overtaken the DaBaby remix to have the greatest share of the song's overall performance that week.

=== Copyright lawsuits ===
On 1 March 2022, reggae band Artikal Sound System filed a suit against Lipa and her label Warner Records alleging copyright infringement, asserting similarities between "Levitating" and their 2017 song "Live Your Life" (and alleging that the producers knew the song before "Levitating" was in production). In June 2023, Artikal Sound System moved to drop the first suit, after a judge ruled there was no evidence to suggest that Lipa or her co-writers had heard "Live Your Life" prior to the creation of "Levitating".

Less than a week after the first suit, a second suit was filed by songwriters L. Russell Brown and Sandy Linzer who claimed that "Levitating" infringed on the 1979 disco song "Wiggle and Giggle All Night" by Cory Daye. On 27 March 2025, the Brown and Linzer suit was dismissed by the court. Referring to the descending scale at issue, the judge wrote that the similarity between the two works only concerned non-copyrightable elements.

== The Blessed Madonna remix ==
"Levitating" (The Blessed Madonna remix)

Single by Dua Lipa and the Blessed Madonna featuring Madonna and Missy Elliott

from the album Club Future Nostalgia
- Released: 13 August 2020
- Studio: Sarm (London, United Kingdom); The Bunker at 13; Sarm Music Village (London, United Kingdom); Modulator Music (Toronto, Canada); Gold Mind
- Genre: EDM; electro-disco; electro house; future bass; techno
- Length: 4:10 (Note: The Blessed Madonna's remix of "Levitating" has a length of 4:10 on the single and standard edition of Club Future Nostalgia, but runs for 3:55 on the DJ Mix edition of the album.)
- Label: Warner; We Still Believe
- Songwriters: Dua Lipa; Clarence Coffee Jr.; Sarah Hudson; Stephen Kozmeniuk; Madonna; Melissa A. Elliott
- Producers: Koz; Stuart Price

Dua Lipa singles chronology
"Un Día (One Day)" (2020)	"Levitating" (The Blessed Madonna remix) (2020)	"Levitating" (2020)

Madonna singles chronology
"I Don't Search I Find" (2020)	"Levitating" (The Blessed Madonna remix) (2020)	"Frozen" (remix) (2021)

Missy Elliott singles chronology
"Do It" (2020)	"Levitating" (The Blessed Madonna remix) (2020)	"ATM" (2020)

Music video
- "Levitating" (The Blessed Madonna remix) on YouTube

=== Background and release ===
Following the release of Future Nostalgia, Lipa enlisted the help of the Blessed Madonna to create a remix album that would later become Club Future Nostalgia. The Blessed Madonna remixed two tracks on the record, "Levitating" and the previously unreleased "Love Is Religion". For "Levitating", which had multiple versions, both Lipa and the Blessed Madonna had the vision of a "fun" club remix. The Blessed Madonna originally created it as if Lipa was the only person singing on it. After finishing the remix, Lipa thought that Madonna and Missy Elliott would sound amazing on it, so she reached out to both of them via email, with both responding saying they would be up for it. Madonna recorded her vocals in a separate studio, with her engineer Mike Dean sending them to the Blessed Madonna. Madonna did several variations, including breaking out into her 1983 single "Lucky Star" for a second. Elliott then sent her verse, which included an air horn. The Blessed Madonna then "frankensteined" the three parts together, before Madonna requested that Dean mix down the song. Dean ended up handing both the mastering and mix down. Both Madonna and Elliott are added as songwriters, while the Blessed Madonna is credited as the remixer and an additional producer.

On 30 June 2020, Lipa's manager Ben Mawson revealed in an interview with Music Week that Lipa's team was attempting to organise a collaboration between her and Madonna. Future Nostalgia was heavily influenced by Madonna's Confessions on a Dance Floor, both of which feature songs co-produced by Stuart Price, including "Levitating". On 27 July 2020, Lipa announced the single release of a remix of "Levitating" by the Blessed Madonna featuring Madonna and Missy Elliott. The song was later confirmed to be the lead single of Club Future Nostalgia. The song premiered at 09:00 PT (16:00 UTC) on 13 August 2020, being released for digital download and streaming. The remix was serviced to contemporary hit radio formats in Italy the same day, and was also released on 12-inch vinyl on 21 August 2020 by We Still Believe, an independent label owned by the Blessed Madonna.

=== Composition ===
"Levitating" (The Blessed Madonna Remix)
A 16-second sample of the bridge and chorus of the Blessed Madonna's "Levitating" remix, featuring vocals from Lipa and Madonna.

The Blessed Madonna's remix of "Levitating" is an EDM, electro-disco, electro house, future bass and techno track. It runs for 4 minutes and 10 seconds, and has a throwback disco and trance vibe. It increases the tempo of the original, with Lipa, Madonna and Elliott each contributing a verse. Lipa and Madonna harmonise with one and other, while trading verses and Elliott half-sings and half-raps. The remix has a dance-orientated house production, consisting of Daft Punk vocoder backing vocals, a pounding bass, nostalgic and futuristic synths, and house beats.

=== Reception ===
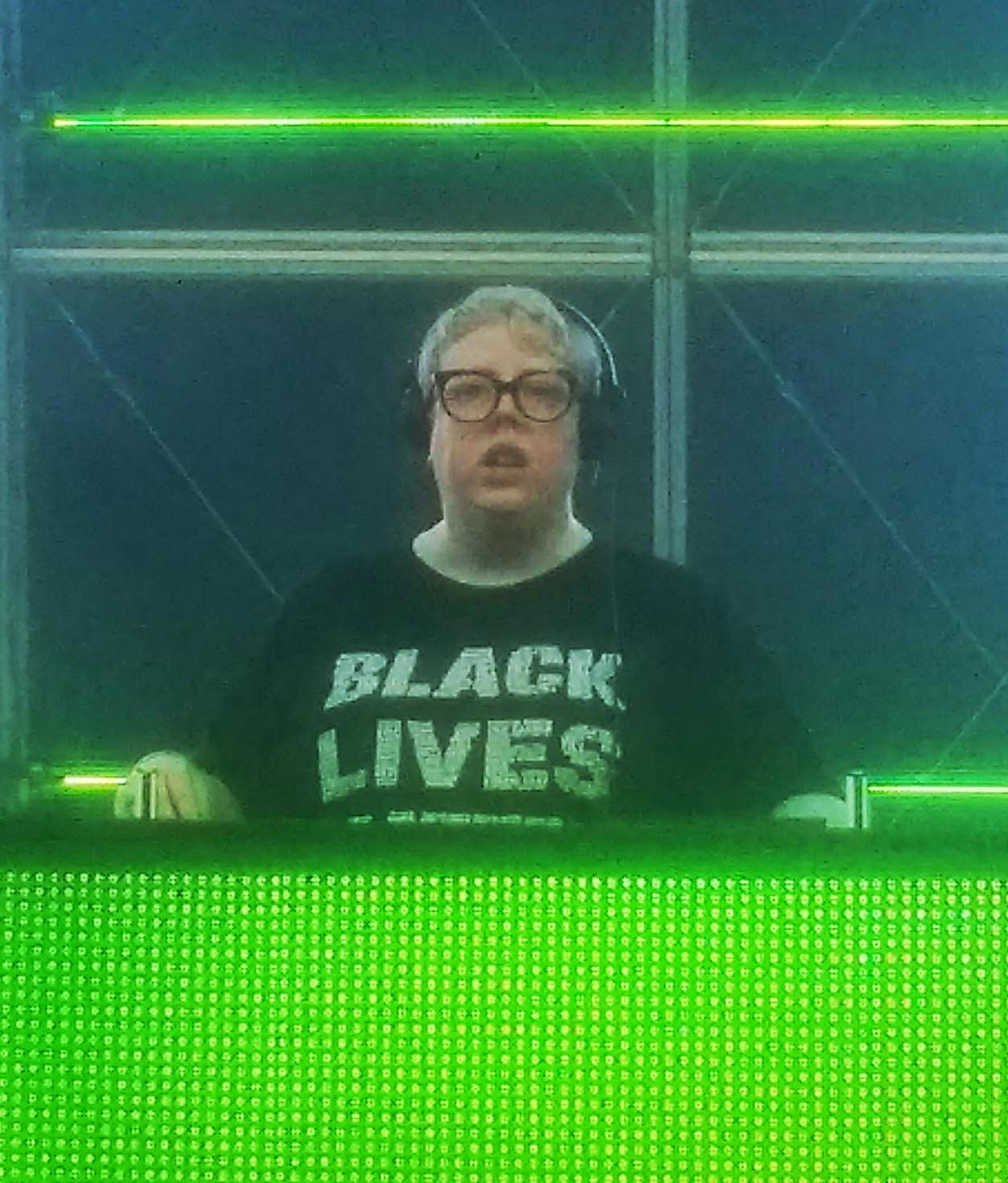
The Blessed Madonna's (pictured) remix of "Levitating" was met with mixed reviews.

The Blessed Madonna's remix of "Levitating" was met with mixed reviews from music critics. In Rolling Stone, Brittany Spanos viewed the Blessed Madonna "Levitating" remix as "tongue-twistingly," a "fast-paced romp," and "clubbier" than the original, while also labelling Elliott's verse "flirty" and "freaky." The staff of Rap-Up called it a "pulsing dance-floor bop," while Maia Kedem of Radio.com viewed Elliott's verse as "tastefully naughty." Billboard's Katie Bain noted the remix for being "darkly funky" and stated it brings the original to "new heights" while Heran Mamo of the same magazine stated it shows Lipa's "star power." Nick Romano of Entertainment Weekly said the remix is "what you need to turn any isolated apartment into the hottest club."

For Slant Magazine, Alexa Camp praised Elliott's "versatility," and stated the Blessed Madonna's "Levitating" remix is worthy of Giorgio Moroder or Cerrone, while Madonna's vocal delivery to Jody Watley. Joe Price of Complex praised Elliott and Madonna's vocals complimenting Lipa's, and noted its further cementation of Lipa's crossover appeal. In a negative review from Clash, Robin Murray stated it has a "truncated nature" feeling that does not "click into place," while also commenting that it "doesn't get the space to breathe properly." AllMusic's Neil Z. Yeung agreed, writing it fails to hit "the highs that the crew targeted." For The Line of Best Fit, Udit Mahalingam thought that it failed to live up to the original. Pitchfork's Owen Myers viewed the Elliott and Madonna features as deflating the remix. In The Guardian, Michael Cragg rated the remix a 6 out of 10, and stated it is "another example of 2020's endless disappointments."

In Canada, the Blessed Madonna's remix reached number 16 on the Canadian Digital Song Sales, In the United States, the Blessed Madonna's remix debuted and peaked at number 10 on the Bubbling Under Hot 100 singles chart, while also reaching number 6 on the Hot Dance/Electronic Songs chart, lasting one and seven weeks on each chart respectively. The Blessed Madonna's remix debuted at number 9 on the NZ Hot Singles chart dated 22 August 2020, It also reached number 47 in Italy and number 10 on the Euro Digital Song Sales chart. Following the release of the DaBaby remix, the Blessed Madonna's remix debuted at number 35 on Australia's ARIA Singles Chart dated 19 October 2020.

=== Music video ===
==== Background and reception ====
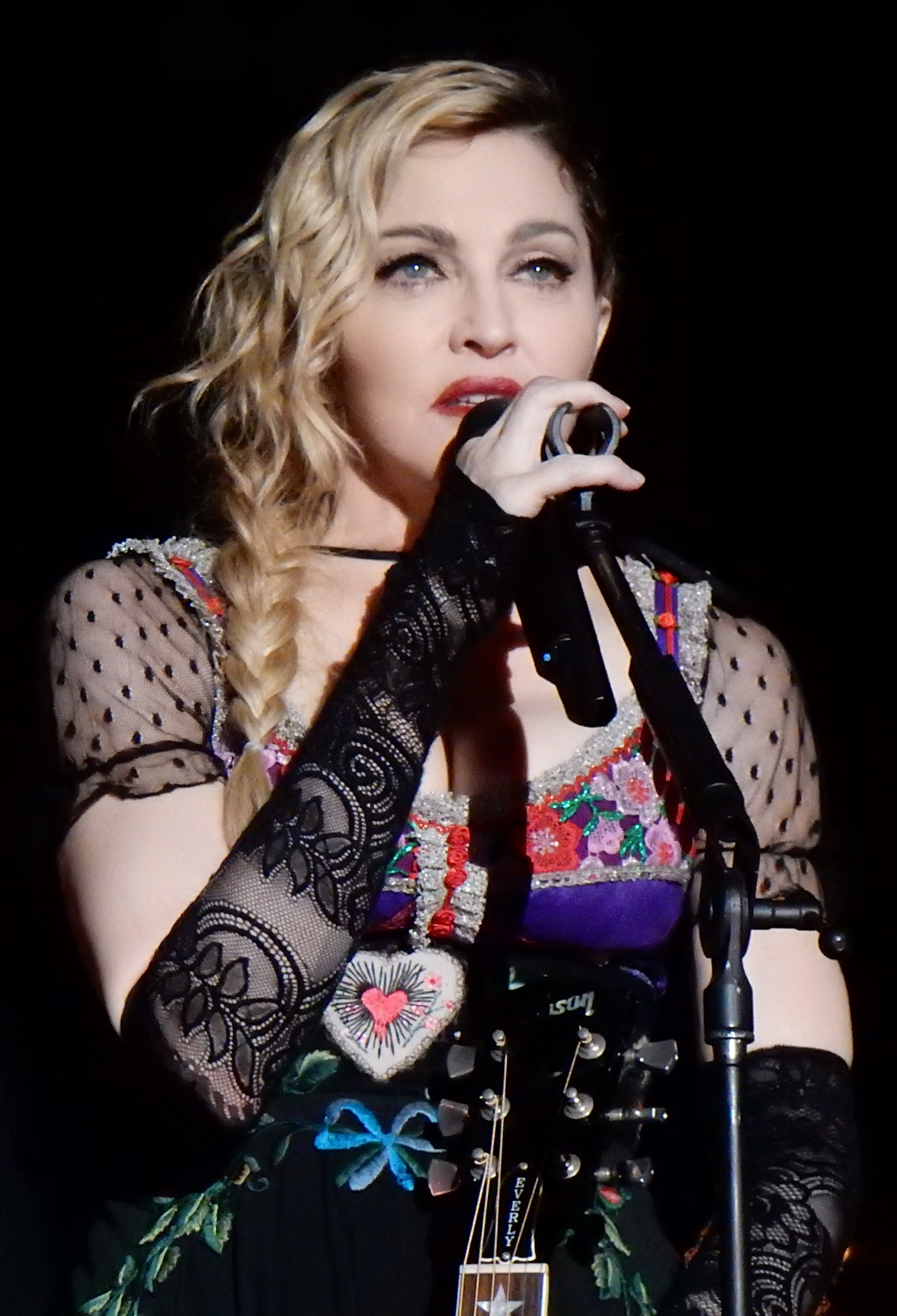
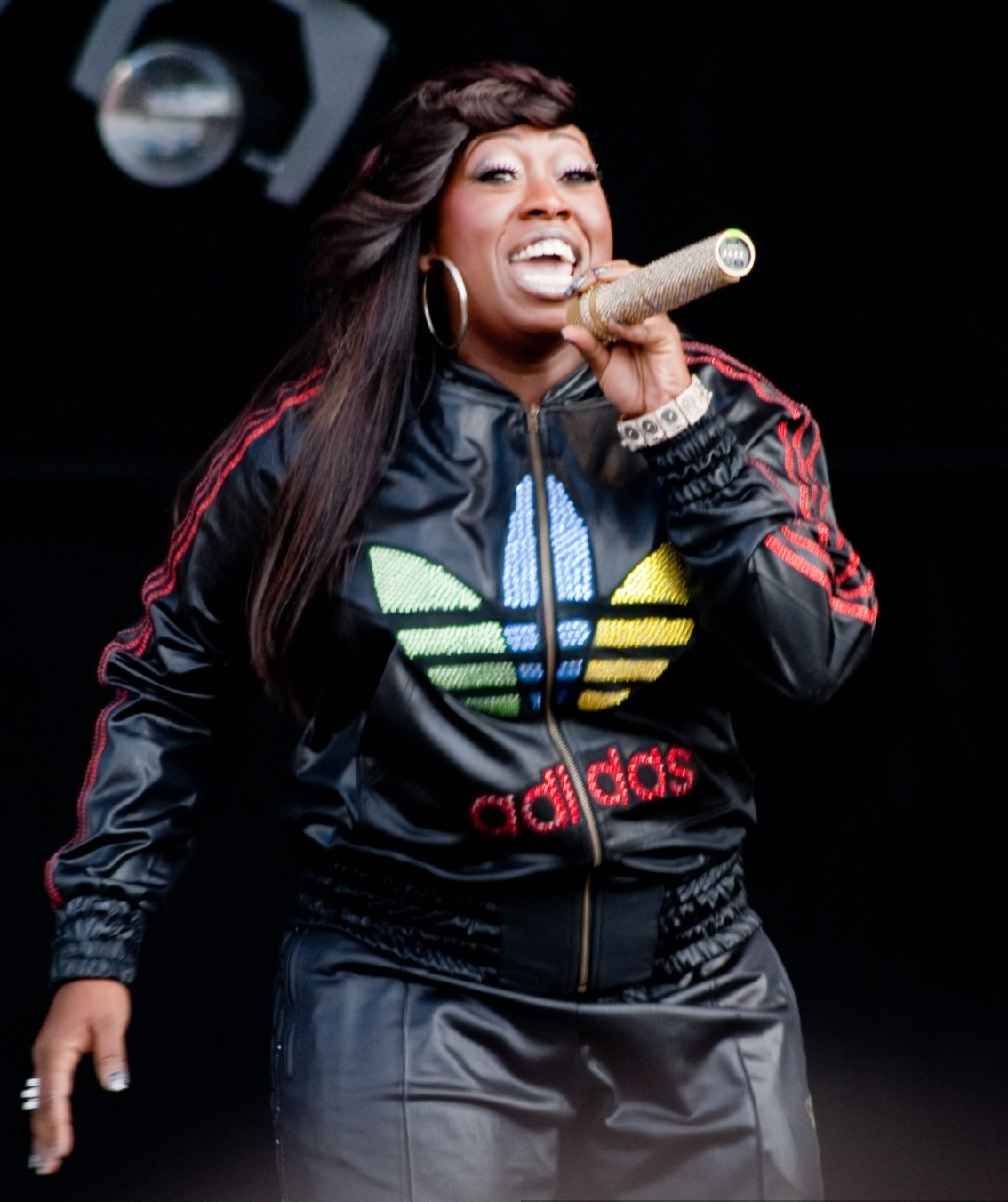
Madonna (left) and Missy Elliott (right) are featured on the Blessed Madonna remix of "Levitating", but only the latter appears in its music video.

The music video for the Blessed Madonna's remix of "Levitating" was directed by Will Hooper and produced by production company Blink, led by producer Corin Taylor and executive producer Laura Northover. Due to lockdown restrictions imposed by the COVID-19 pandemic, the video concept was developed virtually, with many video calls with Lipa and her management team TAP. The crew ran into difficulties during the production due to several film industry services being closed or running at a reduced service. They made sure to run a safe set and follow the government's guidance toward the virus. The video includes appearances from Lipa, Elliott, and Lipa's then-boyfriend, Anwar Hadid, with both the Blessed Madonna and Madonna being absent. It draws inspiration from extraterrestrial life and science fiction. Rina Yang serves as the video's director of photography, and she creates a contemporary and inspired vision, somewhere in between fashion editorial and home video, with many blue and red hues.

The music video was filmed in June 2020 in London over the course of four days, while Elliott filmed her parts with her respective team in Atlanta, in conjunction with Lipa's UK team. It was one of the first large productions to shoot to APA guidelines after the lockdown restrictions. Due to social distancing protocols associated with the COVID-19 pandemic, the production team decided to cast real couples, which led to Hadid's casting. The video's filming, which song was then unknown, was reported on 18 June 2020, along with Hadid's casting. The visual premiered at 05:00 PT (12:00 UTC) on 14 August 2020. Rania Aniftos of Billboard labelled the Blessed Madonna's "Levitating" remix video "colourful" and "dreamy." For Consequence of Sound, Lake Schatz noted its "candy-coated, Miami glaze" lenses and praised its "mythical and celestial imagery." He concluded by stating the video is "snazzy" and like "a four-minute Ring Pop." Radio.com's Maia Kedem viewed the video as a mix of Sailor Moon, Euphoria, and Twilight. In her review for Vogue, Janelle Okwodu complimented its "trippy visuals, bright colors" and wardrobe that visualise Future Nostalgia's "retro rave theme."

==== Synopsis ====
The music video has a theme of "love conquers all," and consists of many scenes synthesising to depict many romantic moments, with each scene being woven in and out of the storyline. The storyline features numerous people getting obsessed with a maze-like symbol while under the influence of a mysterious glowing planet. Throughout the video, psychedelic shots of ghostly fields and gem-studded cars are shown. The video begins with a montage of some of the video's events before Lipa is seen looking at the planet out of a window from an apartment. Her hair is dyed hot pink and she wears Martine Rose logo print PJ pants and an e-girl python bodysuit. She begins to dance around the apartment where a vinyl is playing and is filled with analog recorders and buzzing televisions.

Lipa and Hadid looking at a giant planet in the music video for the Blessed Madonna's "Levitating" remix

The next scene sees a blonde woman in a bedroom looking at herself in a mirror and holding a small item with the maze-like symbol that she hides under her pillow but later breaks it in half. She then looks through a telescope at a brunette girl reading a book. The brunette girl looks straight at the telescope, slightly scaring the blonde girl before the brunette eats the same item that the blonde girl put under her pillow. In the following scene, a bunch of people hang out in a skating park, drawing the maze-like symbol with chalk and skating, as well as a couple kissing. Next, two people are seen walking under a highway-like structure, which has graffiti of the maze-like symbol, with one holding a briefcase. They eventually get to a spot where they open a green-like crystal. Following, a man is seen in the middle of a field, spray-painting the symbol on a white sheet. Another man is seen driving his car to a point near the highway-like structure. He pulls a net out of his car and looks up into the sky. This scene ends with a moon appearing in his car before a woman takes its place.

Towards the end, Elliott makes her appearance for her verse. She wears a Versace palm print, with a lime green jacket and baseball cap alongside outsized hoop earrings and lengthy box braids. A woman in a shimmery disco ball dress is seen dancing in a field, appearing there from a shooting star. Lipa and Hadid are then seen lying in a field of flowers and driving a car into the planet, in which the two kiss. Lipa wears a white-striped navy sailor-inspired Miu Miu knit bodysuit with a Peter Pan collar, while Hadid sports a low-key t-shirt and jeans. The visual ends with Lipa and Hadid starring off at the planet.

== Accolades ==
"Levitating" appeared on the 2020 year-end lists by numerous publications, including being placed as the best song of the year by Cosmopolitan and the Herald Sun. In Billboard, the song placed on their "30 Best Pop Songs of 2020" list. The Guardian writers Laura Snapes, Lanre Bakare, and Hannah J Davies all included the song among their favourite songs of 2020. Steven Pearl of Rolling Stone ranked the DaBaby remix at number six on his year-end list Atwood Magazine's Anthony Kozlowski ranked the original version as 2020's second best song, while Official Charts Company operations executive Cat Smyth named it her favourite song of 2020. Former American president Barack Obama included the DaBaby Remix on his "Favorite Songs of 2020" list. Time Out ranked the solo version of "Levitating" as the thirty-fifth best song of all time.

=== Awards and nominations ===
Awards and nominations for "Levitating"
Year	Organization	Award	Result	Ref(s)
2021	MTV Millennial Awards	Global Hit of the Year	Nominated	
2021	Joox Indonesia Music Awards	Global Song of the Year	Nominated	
2021	MTV Video Music Awards	Song of the Year	Nominated	
2021	MTV Video Music Awards	Song of Summer	Nominated	
2021	MTV Millennial Awards Brazil	Global Hit	Nominated	
2021	Popjustice £20 Music Prize	Best British Pop Single	Nominated	
2021	American Music Awards	Favorite Pop Song	Nominated	
2022	iHeartRadio Music Awards	Song of the Year	Won	
2022	Billboard Music Awards	Top Hot 100 Song	Nominated	
2022	Billboard Music Awards	Top Streaming Song	Nominated	
2022	Billboard Music Awards	Top Selling Song	Nominated	
2022	Billboard Music Awards	Top Radio Song	Won	
2022	Billboard Music Awards	Top Billboard Global 200 Song	Nominated	

=== Year-end lists ===
"Levitating" on year-end lists
Publication	List	Rank	Ref.
Atwood Magazine	Top Songs of 2020	—N/a	
Billboard	Best Songs of 2021	3	
Cosmopolitan	Favorite Songs of 2020	1	
Herald Sun	Best songs of 2020	1	
Insider	The 30 best songs of 2020, ranked	11	
Los Angeles Times	50 best songs of 2020	—N/a	
Our Culture Mag	The 25 Best Songs of 2020	6	
PopBuzz	The 20 best singles of 2020	14	
Slant Magazine	The 50 Best Songs of 2020	5	
USA Today	Best songs of 2020	2	

== Live performances ==
Lipa performed "Levitating" for the first time on The Graham Norton Show on 20 November 2020. Two days later she performed it at the American Music Awards of 2020. The ceremony took place at the Microsoft Theater in Los Angeles, however Lipa's performance was filmed at London's Royal Albert Hall in a custom built set. At the end of the performance, she levitated towards the sky with the help of wires through a pulley system, which gained praise from Olivia Horn of The New York Times and Vulture's Justin Curto, who both viewed the performance as one of the ceremony's best moments. Horn also praised Lipa's dancing abilities. For Radio.com, Marty Rosenbaum ranked it as the night's eighth best moment and also praised the levitating bit.

Lipa performed "Levitating" as the second track on the setlist for her Studio 2054 live stream concert on 27 November 2020. She performed it during her NPR Tiny Desk Concert, released 4 December 2020. The following day, Lipa performed it as a medley with her single "Physical" (2020) at both the LOS40 Music Awards 2020 and the 2020 NRJ Music Awards; she also performed "Fever" (2020) with Angèle at the latter ceremony. On 10 December 2020, Lipa performed an acoustic set at the 2020 iHeartRadio Jingle Ball which included "Levitating" as well as "Don't Start Now" and a cover of "Happy Xmas (War Is Over)", the latter of which was a virtual performance with a few of her fans for Capital One's Holiday Jam. During her 19 December 2020 Saturday Night Live appearance, she performed "Levitating", "Don't Start Now", and acted in a World War II-themed skit. Lipa performed the song as part of her 22 December 2020 Pandora livestream concert. On New Year's Eve 2020, she performed it during YouTube's Hello 2021 virtual countdown special for the Indian, British and American shows.

On 14 March 2021, Lipa performed the remixed version with DaBaby for the first time at the 63rd Annual Grammy Awards, alongside a performance of "Don't Start Now".

On 17 October 2024, as part of An Evening with Dua Lipa TV special, Lipa performed the song at the Royal Albert Hall with the accompaniment of the Heritage Orchestra and fourteen choristers.

On 30 November 2024, Lipa performed a version of "Levitating" during a set of her Radical Optimism Tour in Mumbai, remixed with "Woh Ladki Jo", a popular song from the 90s Bollywood movie Baadshah, which features Bollywood veteran Shahrukh Khan in the acting lead. The original version of the song was performed by playback singer, Abhijeet.

== Track listings ==
Digital download / streaming – DaBaby Remix

1. "Levitating" (featuring DaBaby) – 3:23

Digital download / streaming – KUU Remix

1. "Levitating" (KUU Remix) [featuring DaBaby] – 4:10

Digital EP – Version 1

1. "Levitating" (featuring DaBaby) – 3:23
2. "Levitating" – 3:23
3. "Levitating (The Blessed Madonna Remix)" (featuring Madonna and Missy Elliott) – 4:10
4. "Levitating" (KUU Remix) [featuring DaBaby] – 4:10

Digital download / streaming – Don Diablo Remix

1. "Levitating" (Don Diablo Remix) [featuring DaBaby] – 3:28

Digital download / streaming – Don Diablo Extended Remix

1. "Levitating" (Don Diablo Extended Remix) [featuring DaBaby] – 4:28

Digital EP – Version 2

1. "Levitating" (featuring DaBaby) – 3:23
2. "Levitating" – 3:23
3. "Levitating" (The Blessed Madonna Remix) [featuring Madonna and Missy Elliott] – 4:10
4. "Levitating" (KUU Remix) [featuring DaBaby] – 4:10
5. "Levitating" (Don Diablo Remix) [featuring DaBaby] – 3:28

Digital download / streaming – Amaal Mallik Remix

1. "Levitating" (Amaal Mallik Remix) [featuring Sukriti Kakar and Prakriti Kakar] – 2:36

== Credits and personnel ==
Credits adapted from the liner notes of Future Nostalgia: The Moonlight Edition.

Recording and management

- Vocals recorded at Sarm Studios (London, United Kingdom)
- Recorded at the Bunker at 13, Sarm Music Village (London, United Kingdom) and Modulator Music (Toronto, Canada)
- Mixed at Henson Studios (Hollywood, California)
- Mastered at Sterling Sound (Edgewater, New Jersey)

Personnel

- Dua Lipa – vocals
- DaBaby – featured vocals
- Stephen Kozmeniuk – production, vocal production, bass, drums, guitar, synthesizer
- Stuart Price – production, bass, drum programming, keyboards
- Clarence Coffee Jr. – backing vocals
- Sarah Hudson – backing vocals
- Paul Phamous – backing vocals
- Todd Clark – backing vocals
- Russell Graham – keyboards
- Bosko "Electrospit" Kante – talkbox
- Homer Steinweiss – drums
- Lorna Blackwood – additional vocal recording, programming (Note: For Echo Beach Management)
- Matt Snell – engineering
- Phil Hotz – assistant engineering
- Cameron Gower Poole – vocal engineering
- Josh Gudwin – mixing
- Elijah Marrett-Hitch – assistant mixing
- Heidi Wang – assistant mixing
- Chris Gehringer – mastering
- Will Quinnell – assistant mastering

== Charts ==
=== Weekly charts ===
Chart performance
Chart (2020–2024)	Peak position
Argentina Hot 100 (Billboard)	24
Australia (ARIA)	4
Austria (Ö3 Austria Top 40)	12
Belarus Airplay (TopHit)	111
Belgium (Ultratop 50 Flanders)	32
Belgium (Ultratop 50 Wallonia)	27
Bolivia Airplay (Monitor Latino)	17
Brazil (Top 100 Brasil)	69
Bulgaria Airplay (PROPHON)	1
Canada Hot 100 (Billboard)	1
Canada AC (Billboard)	1
Canada CHR/Top 40 (Billboard)	1
Canada Hot AC (Billboard)	1
Chile Airplay (Monitor Latino)	8
CIS Airplay (TopHit)	15
Colombia Anglo (Monitor Latino)	15
Colombia (National-Report)	12
Croatia International Airplay (HRT)	1
Czech Republic Airplay (ČNS IFPI)	9
Czech Republic Singles Digital (ČNS IFPI)	2
Denmark (Tracklisten)	9
Euro Digital Song Sales (Billboard)	6
Finland (Suomen virallinen lista)	11
France (SNEP)	24
Germany (GfK)	16
Global 200 (Billboard)	2
Greece (IFPI)	3
Hungary (Dance Top 40)	3
Hungary (Rádiós Top 40)	9
Hungary (Single Top 40)	8
Hungary (Stream Top 40)	2
Iceland (Tónlistinn)	11
India International Singles (IMI)	2
Ireland (IRMA)	4
Italy (FIMI)	41
Japan Hot Overseas (Billboard)	7
Kazakhstan Airplay (TopHit)	127
Lebanon (Lebanese Top 20)	10
Lithuania (AGATA)	6
Malaysia (RIM)	8
Mexico (Billboard Mexican Airplay)	15
Netherlands (Dutch Top 40)	20
Netherlands (Single Top 100)	23
New Zealand (Recorded Music NZ)	5
Norway (VG-lista)	7
Poland Airplay (ZPAV)	3
Portugal (AFP)	11
Portugal Airplay (AFP)	3
Russia Airplay (TopHit)	22
San Marino (SMRRTV Top 50)	2
Scottish Singles Sales (Official Charts)	13
Singapore (RIAS)	6
Slovakia Airplay (ČNS IFPI)	23
Slovakia Singles Digital (ČNS IFPI)	4
Slovenia (SloTop50)	24
South Africa (RISA)	16
South Korea (Gaon)	171
Spain (Promusicae)	71
Sweden (Sverigetopplistan)	20
Switzerland (Schweizer Hitparade)	11
UK Singles (Official Charts)	5
US Billboard Hot 100	2
US Adult Contemporary (Billboard)	1
US Adult Pop Airplay (Billboard)	1
US Pop Airplay (Billboard)	1
US Rhythmic Airplay (Billboard)	22
US Rolling Stone Top 100	3
Vietnam (Vietnam Hot 100)	83

=== Monthly charts ===
Monthly chart performance
Chart (2021)	Peak position
CIS Airplay (TopHit)	19
Czech Republic (Rádio – Top 100)	9
Czech Republic (Singles Digitál Top 100)	2
Russia Airplay (TopHit)	30
Slovakia (Rádio – Top 100)	32
Slovakia (Singles Digitál Top 100)	3

=== Year-end charts ===
2020 year-end chart performance for "Levitating"
Chart (2020)	Position
Netherlands (Dutch Top 40)	85

2021 year-end chart performance for "Levitating"
Chart (2021)	Position
Australia (ARIA)	5
Austria (Ö3 Austria Top 40)	28
Belgium (Ultratop Flanders)	77
Belgium (Ultratop Wallonia)	66
Brazil Airplay (Crowley)	97
Brazil Streaming (Pro-Música Brasil)	121
Canada (Canadian Hot 100)	1
CIS Airplay (TopHit)	71
Croatia (ARC Top 100)	6
Croatia (ARC Top 40)	6
Denmark (Tracklisten)	14
France (SNEP)	20
Germany (Official German Charts)	42
Global 200 (Billboard)	1
Hungary (Dance Top 40)	16
Hungary (Rádiós Top 40)	17
Hungary (Single Top 40)	37
Hungary (Stream Top 40)	3
India International Streaming (IMI)	3
Ireland (IRMA)	4
Italy (FIMI)	66
Global Charts (IFPI)	3
Mexico Streaming (AMPROFON)	3
Netherlands (Single Top 100)	23
New Zealand (Recorded Music NZ)	2
Norway (VG-lista)	14
Poland (ZPAV)	61
Portugal (AFP)	19
Russia Airplay (TopHit)	114
Sweden (Sverigetopplistan)	40
Switzerland (Schweizer Hitparade)	19
UK Singles (OCC)	6
US Billboard Hot 100	1
US Adult Contemporary (Billboard)	5
US Adult Top 40 (Billboard)	1
US Mainstream Top 40 (Billboard)	1

2022 year-end chart performance for "Levitating"
Chart (2022)	Position
Australia (ARIA)	14
Canada (Canadian Hot 100)	40
Denmark (Tracklisten)	88
France (SNEP)	93
Global 200 (Billboard)	14
Hungary (Dance Top 40)	14
India International Singles (IMI)	10
Hungary (Rádiós Top 40)	25
Lithuania (AGATA)	78
New Zealand (Recorded Music NZ)	18
Switzerland (Schweizer Hitparade)	83
UK Singles (OCC)	56
US Billboard Hot 100	42
US Adult Contemporary (Billboard)	9

2023 year-end chart performance for "Levitating"
Chart (2023)	Position
Australia (ARIA)	47
Global 200 (Billboard)	35
Hungary (Dance Top 40)	88
Hungary (Rádiós Top 40)	53
New Zealand (Recorded Music NZ)	45

2024 year-end chart performance for "Levitating"
Chart (2024)	Position
Global 200 (Billboard)	97

2025 year-end chart performance for "Levitating"
Chart (2025)	Position
Argentina Anglo Airplay (Monitor Latino)	77
Chile Airplay (Monitor Latino)	92
Global 200 (Billboard)	112
Hungary (Rádiós Top 40)	49

=== All-time charts ===
All-time chart performance
Chart (Note: As of November 2021)	Position
US Billboard Hot 100	32

Chart performance
Chart (2020)	Peak position
Australia (ARIA)	35
Belgium (Ultratip Bubbling Under Flanders)	24
Belgium (Ultratip Bubbling Under Wallonia)	16
Canada Digital Song Sales (Billboard)	16
Canada CHR/Top 40 (Billboard)	48
Euro Digital Song Sales (Billboard)	10
Ireland (IRMA) (Note: In this country, "Levitating (The Blessed Madonna Remix)" was combined with the chart entry for the original version of "Levitating", and thus entered the chart as one release.)	41
Italy (FIMI)	47
Mexico Airplay (Billboard)	30
Netherlands (Single Tip)	15
New Zealand Hot Singles (RMNZ)	9
Panama Anglo (Monitor Latino)	5
Paraguay (SGP)	87
Portugal (AFP)	83
Scotland (OCC)	22
Spain (Promusicae)	71
US Bubbling Under Hot 100 Singles (Billboard)	10
US Digital Song Sales (Billboard)	13
US Hot Dance/Electronic Songs (Billboard)	6
Venezuela (Record Report)	43

Year-end chart performance
Chart (2020)	Position
US Hot Dance/Electronic Songs (Billboard)	40

== Certifications ==
Certifications and sales
Region	Certification	Certified units/sales
Australia (ARIA)	15× Platinum	1,050,000^{‡}
Austria (IFPI Austria)	3× Platinum	90,000^{‡}
Belgium (BRMA)	Gold	20,000^{‡}
Brazil (Pro-Música Brasil)	Diamond	160,000^{‡}
Canada (Music Canada)	Diamond	800,000^{‡}
Denmark (IFPI Danmark)	3× Platinum	270,000^{‡}
France (SNEP)	Diamond	333,333^{‡}
Germany (BVMI)	Platinum	400,000^{‡}
Italy (FIMI)	3× Platinum	300,000^{‡}
New Zealand (RMNZ)	10× Platinum	300,000^{‡}
Norway (IFPI Norway)	2× Platinum	120,000^{‡}
Poland (ZPAV)	Diamond	250,000^{‡}
Portugal (AFP)	3× Platinum	30,000^{‡}
Spain (Promusicae)	2× Platinum	120,000^{‡}
United Kingdom (BPI)	5× Platinum	3,000,000^{‡}
United States (RIAA)	13× Platinum	13,000,000^{‡}
Streaming
Japan (RIAJ)	Gold	50,000,000^{†}
^{‡} Sales+streaming figures based on certification alone.^{†} Streaming-only figures based on certification alone.

== Release history ==
Release dates and formats
Region	Date	Format(s)	Version	Label	Ref.
Various	13 August 2020	Digital download; streaming	The Blessed Madonna remix	Warner	
Italy	13 August 2020	Radio airplay	The Blessed Madonna remix	Warner	
Italy	13 August 2020	Radio airplay	Original (Note: Release as a promotional single)	Warner	
United Kingdom	21 August 2020	12-inch vinyl	The Blessed Madonna remix	We Still Believe	
Various	1 October 2020	Digital download; streaming	DaBaby remix	Warner	
Italy	2 October 2020	Radio airplay	DaBaby remix	Warner	
United States	6 October 2020	Contemporary hit radio	DaBaby remix	Warner	
United States	19 October 2020	Adult contemporary radio	Original	Warner	
Various	20 November 2020	Digital download; streaming	KUU remix	Warner	
Various	20 November 2020	Digital download; streaming	EP Version 1	Warner	
Various	11 December 2020	Digital download; streaming	Don Diablo remixes	Warner	
Various	11 December 2020	Digital download; streaming	EP Version 2	Warner	
Various	26 March 2021	Digital download; streaming	Amaal Mallik remix	Warner	

== See also ==
- List of top 10 singles for 2020 in Australia
- List of top 10 singles for 2021 in Australia
- List of top 10 singles in 2020 (Ireland)
- List of UK top-ten singles in 2020
- List of UK top-ten singles in 2021
- List of Billboard Hot 100 top-ten singles in 2021
- List of Canadian Hot 100 number-one singles of 2021
- List of Billboard Adult Contemporary number ones of 2021
- List of most-streamed songs on Spotify
