= The Onyx Family =

American YouTubers family

- Born: Mirthell Mitchell; September 12 Rita Mitchell; June 5 Shalom Mitchell; September 9 Sinead Mitchell; August 30 Sade (Shasha) Mitchell; May 1 Shiloh Mitchell; January 19
- Occupations: YouTubers; actor; social media influencer; entrepreneur; podcast host; Talk Show Hosts

YouTube information
- Channels: Onyx Family; Onyx Kids
- Years active: 2016–present
- Genres: Comedy; Vlog; Educational
- Subscribers: 4.18 million (Onyx Family); 2.96 million (Onyx Kids)
- Views: 2.98 billion (Onyx Family); 1.87 billion (Onyx Kids)
- Last updated: April 10, 2026
- Website: onyxfamily.com

The Onyx Family is an American family best known for posting family vlogs on their YouTube channels, The Onyx Family and Onyx Kids. In 2021, they starred in the YouTube Red Originals series, The Onyx Family Dinner Show, which is part of the $100 million YouTube Black Voices Fund.

== YouTube career ==
The Onyx Family started their career on YouTube in 2015, has more than 7 million YouTube subscribers and over 4.7 billion total views (across both channels) as of July 2025. The family of six, which consists of parents Mirthell and Rita Onyx, along with their four kids Shalom, Sinead, Sade (Shasha) and Shiloh, who would do challenges, vlogs, and comedy sketches.

=== Work with PocketWatch ===
In 2019, The Onyx Family signed a deal with PocketWatch to launch Onyx Monster Mysteries, a 12-episode animated series. In October 2020, PocketWatch partnered with Shine Global to produce Onyx Family Dinner show, Onyx Family Dinner show, a new YouTube Original talk show featuring the Onyx family that hosts weekly dinner guests. The program is a part of YouTube's "#YouTubeBlack Voices Fund" and was executive produced by Keith Brown, Albie Hecht, Chris Williams and the Onyx family.

=== Interviews ===
In October 2020, they collaborated with Dr. Fauci in an interview aimed to educate people and have a better understanding of what is happening around them during the COVID-19 pandemic.

In January 2021, they participate in Joe Biden and Kamala Harris Inauguration event, Our White House: An Inaugural Celebration for Young Americans hosted by Keke Palmer. On July 20, 2021, they were featured in the daytime television talk show, The Dr. Oz Show hosted by Dr. Mehmet Oz discussing how they got started in the fields of entertainment and YouTube. On September 27, 2021, they have appeared in Ryan's Mystery Playdate television series providing help to Ryan and his family in an episode entitled Ryan's Fizzy Playdate/Ryan's Artistic Playdate.

They were featured in several shows and TV channels such as Home & Family, Black News Channel, NBC LX, and participated in Matthew McConaughey's discussion about his book Greenlights and were interviewed by Sheen Magazine.

== See also ==
- List of YouTubers
