= Hello 2021 =

Series of five localized virtual New Year's eve countdown special

- Presented by: Hello 2021: Americas; Juanpa Zurita; Storm Reid; Hello 2021: Korea; Yang Se-chan; Hwang Je-sung; Hello 2021: Japan; Orutana Channel; Mochizuki Rie
- Country of origin: The Americas; United Kingdom; South Korea; Japan; India

Production
- Production companies: YouTube; Fremantle

Original release
- Network: YouTube (United States); Twitch (worldwide)
- Release: December 31, 2020

Hello 2021 was a series of five localized virtual New Year's Eve countdown specials which were broadcast on YouTube on December 31, 2020. Originating from the Americas, the United Kingdom, South Korea, Japan and India, the specials celebrated the most notable videos of the year 2020 and also featured musical performances and guest celebrity appearances. It was co-produced by YouTube and Fremantle.

== Editions ==
=== Hello 2021: Americas ===
Hello 2021: Americas was hosted by YouTuber Juanpa Zurita and actress Storm Reid and premiered on December 31 at 10:30pm EST/7:30pm PST/9:30pm Mexican Time and January 1 at 12:30am Argentinian Time/Brazilian Time on the YouTube Originals channel. It featured appearances by various actors, musicians, and internet personalities, as well as segments from numerous YouTubers. It also had performances by Dua Lipa, J Balvin, YG, Karol G, and Kane Brown.

==== Appearances ====
The following personalities appeared on Hello 2021: Americas:

- Ben Azelart
- David Blaine
- Ryan Blaney
- James Blunt
- Joel Kim Booster
- Dom Brack
- Karamo Brown
- Marques Brownlee
- Naomi Campbell
- Sabrina Carpenter
- Emma Chamberlain
- Charli and Dixie D'Amelio's family
- Andrew Davila
- The Dolan Twins
- Meg Donnelly
- Dude Perfect
- Moriah Elizabeth
- Jimmy Fallon
- Fortune Feimster
- Midori Francis
- Avani Gregg
- Guava Juice
- Hunter Hayes
- Lexi Hensler
- Crawford Millham Horton
- Hyram
- Trevor Jackson
- Larray
- Zara Larsson
- Demi Lovato
- Rudy Mancuso
- Manny MUA
- MatPat
- Trixie Mattel
- Matthew McConaughey
- Brooklyn and Bailey McKnight
- Brad Mondo
- MrBeast
- Ne-Yo
- Finneas O'Connell
- The Onyx Family
- Stephanie Patrick
- PatrickStarrr
- Chelsea Peretti
- Rob Riggle
- Brent and Lexi Rivera
- Bretman Rock
- RuPaul
- Tom Sandoval
- Tom Schwartz
- Shangela
- Jay Shetty
- Alexandra Shipp
- Megan Stalter
- Chrishell Stause
- Hannah Stocking
- Alan and Alex Stokes
- Sarah Tiana
- Bubba Wallace
- Pierson Wodzynski
- Yungblud
- ZHC
- Maddie Ziegler

=== Hello 2021: UK ===
Sponsored by JD Sports, Hello 2021: UK had appearances by Behzinga, Big Narstie, Katherine Ryan, Michaela Coel, the cast of People Just Do Nothing (known as Kurupt FM), Yammy, WillNE, Holly H, Natasia Demetriou, and Ellie White. It also had performances and cameos by Dua Lipa, Anne-Marie, MNEK with Joel Corry, Aitch & AJ Tracey, Adrian Bliss, Calfreezy, Cassetteboy, DJ Beats, Humza Arshad, Jessica Kellgren-Fozard, Joe Wicks, Naomi Campbell, Nigel Ng, Novympia, Olivia Neill, Raye, and RuPaul.

Like its American counterpart, the British special aired on December 31 at 10:30pm GMT on the YouTube Originals channel.

=== Hello 2021: Korea ===
Hello 2021: Korea was hosted by comedians Yang Se-chan and Hwang Je-sung and will feature appearances by top and rising Korean content creators and artists such as GGILGGIL Market, Tester Hoon, and Balming Tiger. It will begin streaming on December 31 at 11pm KST via the YouTube Korea Spotlight channel.

=== Hello 2021: Japan ===
Hosted by YouTuber Orutana Channel and actress Mochizuki Rie, Hello 2021: Japan was a quiz show testing the guests' knowledge on 2020 YouTube trends and trivias. Joining the hosts were Japanese content creators Tokai On Air, Puritto Channel, Emirin, Paparapys, Skypeace, Vamyun, Dekakin, Hanaodengan, and M.S.S. Project.

The Japanese special was streamed on the YouTube Japan Spotlight channel on December 31 at 11:45pm JST.

=== Hello 2021: India ===
Hello 2021: India was a 60-minute countdown show which had the biggest and most buzzworthy musicians, comedians and Bollywood artists. It had appearances by Tiger Shroff, Badshah, Zakir Khan, Jonita Gandhi, Benny Dayal, and Aastha Gill, including a performance by Dua Lipa.

The Indian special wasstreamed on December 31 at 11pm IST on the YouTube India Spotlight channel.
