= List of Billboard Adult Contemporary number ones of 2021 =

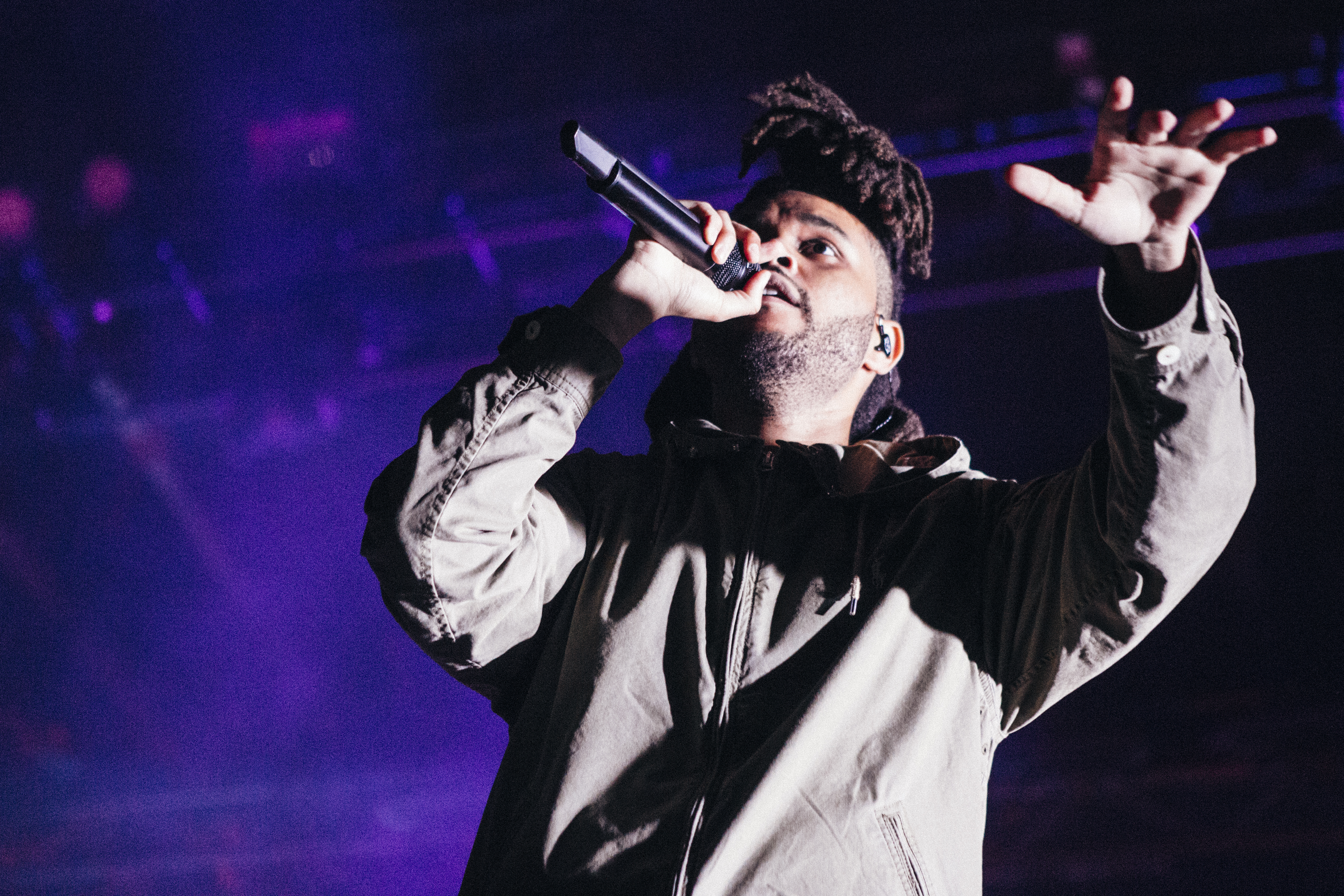
Canadian singer the Weeknd returned to number one in the issue of Billboard dated January 9 with "Blinding Lights" and held the top spot for 30 non-consecutive weeks.

Adult Contemporary is a chart published by Billboard ranking the top-performing songs in the United States in the adult contemporary music (AC) market, based on weekly airplay data from radio stations compiled by Broadcast Data Systems.

In the issue of Billboard dated January 2, "White Christmas" by Meghan Trainor featuring Seth MacFarlane was at number one, its fourth week in the top spot. The following week it was replaced by "Blinding Lights" by Canadian singer the Weeknd, which returned to number one following a five-week run in the previous year, and topped the chart for 30 non-consecutive weeks. Its run was ended by "Levitating" by English singer Dua Lipa in the issue of Billboard dated July 31. "Blinding Lights" then returned to the top spot for a single week only for "Levitating" to replace it once again and hold the top spot for 12 consecutive weeks. The total of 35 weeks which the song spent at number one on the AC chart was one week short of the record held by "Girls Like You" by Maroon 5 and Cardi B.

In the issue dated November 13, British singer Adele topped the chart with "Easy on Me", which was her first chart topper since 2016. The song reached number one in its fourth week on the listing, the fastest rise to the top spot by a non-Christmas song since the same singer's track "Hello" in 2015 and tied for the second-fastest such rise since the chart began to be based on Nielsen data in 1993. It was replaced by another song by a British singer, Ed Sheeran's "Bad Habits", which reached the top spot in its 22nd week on the chart. In the issue dated December 11, Canadian singer Michael Bublé topped the chart with his version of the 1940s song "Let It Snow! Let It Snow! Let It Snow!". The song continued a trend of Christmas-themed tracks topping the AC chart in December, reflecting the fact that adult contemporary radio stations usually switch to playing exclusively festive songs in the period leading up to the holiday.

== Chart history ==
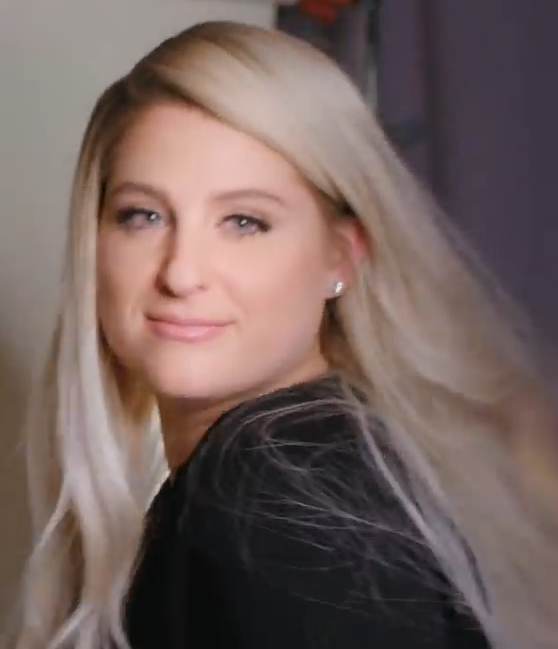
Meghan Trainor's rendition of "White Christmas" was at number one on the first chart of 2021, the song's fourth week in the top spot.

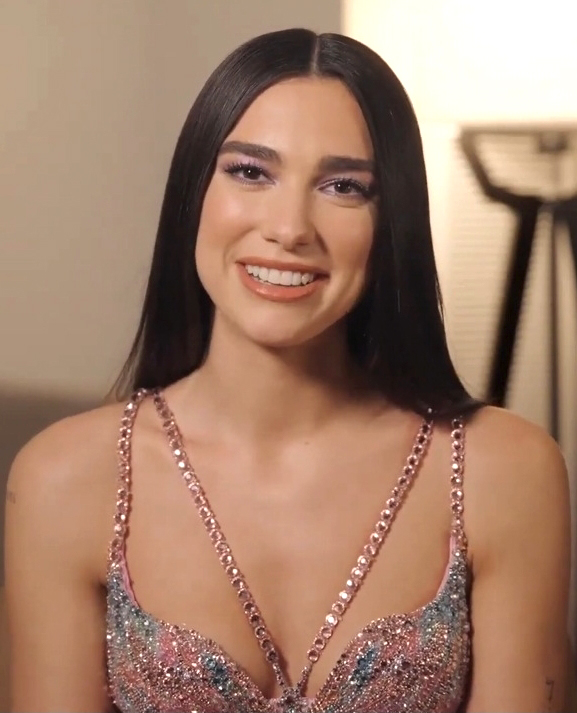
English singer Dua Lipa's song "Levitating" spent 14 non-consecutive weeks at number one.

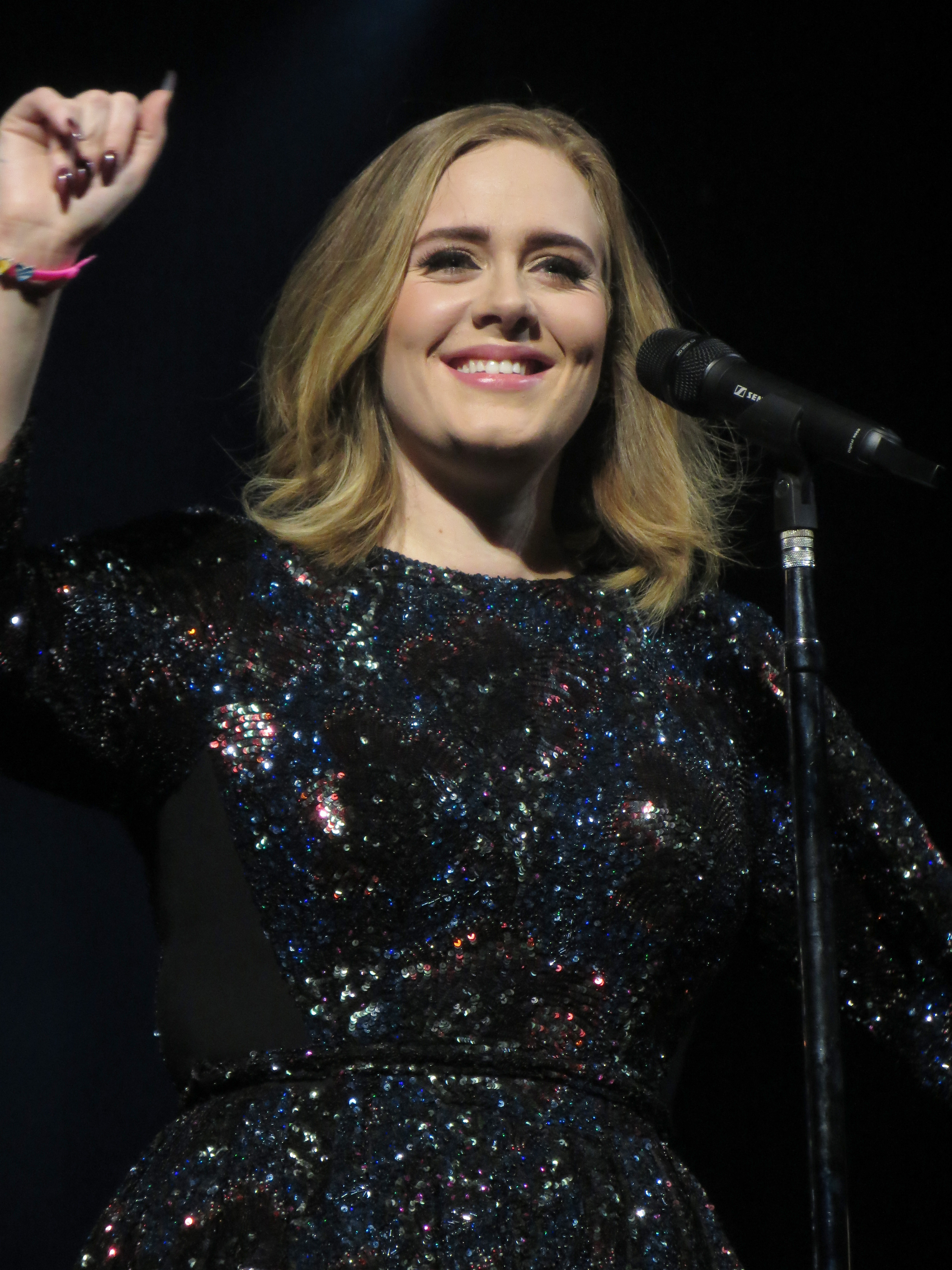
Adele's "Easy on Me" reached number one in its fourth week on the chart, the fastest rise for a non-Christmas song for six years.

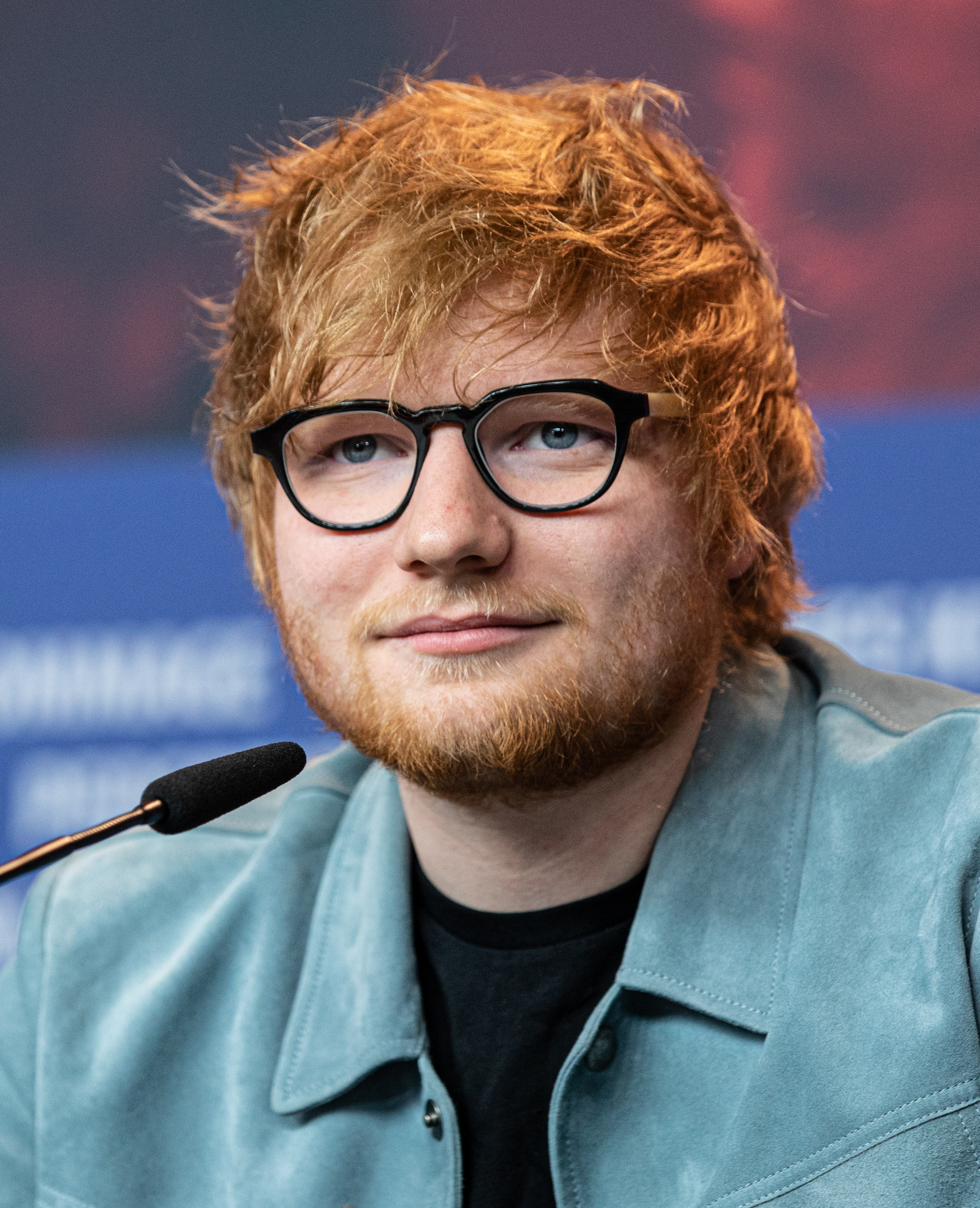
British singer Ed Sheeran topped the chart in December with his song "Bad Habits".

Key
†	Indicates best-performing AC song of 2021

Issue date	Title	Artist(s)	Ref.
January 2	"White Christmas"	Meghan Trainor featuring Seth MacFarlane	
January 9	"Blinding Lights" †	The Weeknd	
January 16	"Blinding Lights" †	The Weeknd	
January 23	"Blinding Lights" †	The Weeknd	
January 30	"Blinding Lights" †	The Weeknd	
February 6	"Blinding Lights" †	The Weeknd	
February 13	"Blinding Lights" †	The Weeknd	
February 20	"Blinding Lights" †	The Weeknd	
February 27	"Blinding Lights" †	The Weeknd	
March 6	"Blinding Lights" †	The Weeknd	
March 13	"Blinding Lights" †	The Weeknd	
March 20	"Blinding Lights" †	The Weeknd	
March 27	"Blinding Lights" †	The Weeknd	
April 3	"Blinding Lights" †	The Weeknd	
April 10	"Blinding Lights" †	The Weeknd	
April 17	"Blinding Lights" †	The Weeknd	
April 24	"Blinding Lights" †	The Weeknd	
May 1	"Blinding Lights" †	The Weeknd	
May 8	"Blinding Lights" †	The Weeknd	
May 15	"Blinding Lights" †	The Weeknd	
May 22	"Blinding Lights" †	The Weeknd	
May 29	"Blinding Lights" †	The Weeknd	
June 5	"Blinding Lights" †	The Weeknd	
June 12	"Blinding Lights" †	The Weeknd	
June 19	"Blinding Lights" †	The Weeknd	
June 26	"Blinding Lights" †	The Weeknd	
July 3	"Blinding Lights" †	The Weeknd	
July 10	"Blinding Lights" †	The Weeknd	
July 17	"Blinding Lights" †	The Weeknd	
July 24	"Blinding Lights" †	The Weeknd	
July 31	"Levitating"	Dua Lipa	
August 7	"Blinding Lights" †	The Weeknd	
August 14	"Levitating"	Dua Lipa	
August 21	"Levitating"	Dua Lipa	
August 28	"Levitating"	Dua Lipa	
September 4	"Levitating"	Dua Lipa	
September 11	"Levitating"	Dua Lipa	
September 18	"Levitating"	Dua Lipa	
September 25	"Levitating"	Dua Lipa	
October 2	"Levitating"	Dua Lipa	
October 9	"Levitating"	Dua Lipa	
October 16	"Levitating"	Dua Lipa	
October 23	"Levitating"	Dua Lipa	
October 30	"Levitating"	Dua Lipa	
November 6	"Levitating"	Dua Lipa	
November 13	"Easy on Me"	Adele	
November 20	"Easy on Me"	Adele	
November 27	"Easy on Me"	Adele	
December 4	"Bad Habits"	Ed Sheeran	
December 11	"Let It Snow! (10th Anniversary)"	Michael Bublé	
December 18	"Let It Snow! (10th Anniversary)"	Michael Bublé	
December 25	"Let It Snow! (10th Anniversary)"	Michael Bublé	
