= Ryan's Mystery Playdate =

American preschool television series

- Created by: Albie Hecht
- Directed by: Adam Weissman; Greg Zekowski
- Starring: Ryan Kaji; Shion Kaji; Loann Kaji
- Voices of: Bradley William Smith; Gibson Collins; Julia Stockton
- Opening theme: "Who Will It Be?", performed by Ryan ToysReview
- Ending theme: "Who Will It Be?"
- Country of origin: United States
- Original language: English
- No. of seasons: 4
- No. of episodes: 117 (list of episodes)

Production
- Executive producers: Albie Hecht; Chris M. Williams; Shion Kaji; Loann Kaji; Jeff Sutphen
- Producer: Diondra Meravi
- Running time: 11 minutes (regular); 24 minutes (specials)
- Production companies: Sunlight Entertainment LLC; PocketWatch, Inc.; Nickelodeon Productions

Original release
- Network: Nickelodeon (2019–21); Nick Jr. (2023)
- Release: April 19, 2019 – April 16, 2023

Ryan's Mystery Playdate is an American live-action/animated children's television series created by Albie Hecht and produced by the company PocketWatch that aired on Nickelodeon from April 19, 2019 to April 16, 2023. The series is based on the Ryan's World YouTube channel, which signed an advertising deal with PocketWatch in 2017.

In an attempt by PocketWatch to match the YouTube channel's style, all of the show's dialogue is improvised, and the only scripted segments are scene transitions and explanations of the challenges.

On March 28, 2024, the series was removed from Paramount+ as part of a "strategic decision to focus on content with mass global appeal."

== Overview ==
The series focuses on Ryan, his parents, and two animated characters named Gus the Gummy Gator and Combo Panda. Episodes show a selection of physical challenges and unboxing puzzles.

== Production ==
The show's first 20 episodes were announced as part of Nickelodeon's 2019 content slate on February 14, 2019. On April 24, 2019, the series was renewed for a second season of 20 episodes, bringing a total of 40 episodes for the series. On February 24, 2020, the series was renewed for a third season of 20 episodes, bringing a total of 60 episodes for the series. On June 30, 2020, the series was renewed for a fourth season, initially consisting of 10 episodes. On September 24, 2021, the season was given an additional 20-episode order, bringing a total of 90 episodes for the series.

On December 16, 2020, it was announced that PocketWatch had presold the series to various broadcasters around the world, including e-Junior and Spacetoon in the Middle East.

== Episodes ==
Season	Episodes		Originally released		
Season	Episodes		First released	Last released	Network
1	20		April 19, 2019	September 20, 2019	Nickelodeon
2	20		September 30, 2019	February 20, 2020	Nickelodeon
3	20		March 30, 2020	February 26, 2021	Nickelodeon
4	30	18	May 3, 2021	November 4, 2021	Nickelodeon
4	30	12	April 11, 2023	April 16, 2023	Nick Jr.
