= Ryan's World =

Children's YouTube channel

YouTube information
- Channel: Ryan's World
- Years active: 2015–present
- Genres: Children; toy unboxing
- Subscribers: 40.3 million
- Views: 63.65 billion
- Last updated: July 26, 2026

Ryan's World (formerly Ryan ToysReview) is a YouTube channel for children featuring Ryan Kaji along with his family.

The channel usually releases a new video daily. One of the channel's videos, titled Huge Eggs Surprise Toys Challenge, has over 2 billion views as of January 2023, making it one of the 60 most-viewed videos on YouTube. As of April 2026, the channel has over 40.3 million subscribers and over 63.29 billion views.

The Verge has described the channel as "a mash-up of personal vlog and 'unboxing' video, a blend of innocent childhood antics and relentless, often overwhelming consumerism". According to Forbes, Kaji earned $11 million between 2016 and 2017 as the eighth highest-paid YouTuber, and in 2018, 2019 and 2020, was listed as the highest-paid YouTuber, earning $22 million, $26 million, and $29.5 million respectively from his videos and product line.

A feature film based on the channel, Ryan's World the Movie: Titan Universe Adventure, was released on August 16, 2024, across 2,000 theaters in the United States.

== History ==
Ryan Kaji's parents Shion and Loann met as undergraduate students at Texas Tech University. Loann's family fled from Vietnam as refugees. She grew up in Houston and became a teacher. Shion had moved to the United States from Japan in high school and left Texas to get a master's in engineering at Cornell University, returned soon after Ryan's birth, and completed his degree online.

At the age of three, after watching other toy review channels, Ryan Kaji began making YouTube videos in March 2015. Loann quit her job as a high school chemistry teacher to work on the YouTube channel full-time.

Before going live on YouTube, the family replaced their real-life surname, Guan, with the on-screen surname Kaji.

In 2017, Kaji's parents signed a deal with PocketWatch, a startup children's media company that was founded in 2016 by Albie Hecht and Chris Williams. PocketWatch does the marketing and merchandise for Ryan's YouTube channels. In 2018, Ryan ToysReview, in cooperation with PocketWatch and WildWorks, created an app called Tag with Ryan, an endless runner game targeted towards children, for iOS and Android. In 2019, Ryan ToysReview and PocketWatch produced a 20-episode television series for preschoolers titled Ryan's Mystery Playdate. On November 1, 2019, Outright Games released a video game titled Race with Ryan, a racing game featuring Kaji and characters from the Ryan's World brand, for PlayStation 4, Xbox One, Nintendo Switch and Microsoft Windows.

A hybrid live-action and animated television special, Super Spy Ryan, premiered November 27, 2020, on Amazon Kids+. On December 4, 2020, Ryan's World announced the launch of an official game on the gaming platform Roblox. On March 4, 2022, Outright Games released a second Ryan's World licensed video game, Ryan's Rescue Squad, an action-adventure game for PlayStation 4, PlayStation 5, Xbox One, Xbox Series X/S, Nintendo Switch, Microsoft Windows, and Stadia. On September 28, 2023, Sunlight Entertainment, a production company owned by Ryan's family, partnered with Toei Animation to create Elemon, a flash-animated anime-style series focused on teaching children about chemistry.

== Influence ==
Kaji has impacted the toy industry through the high view counts of his toy reviews, which will sometimes affect toy sales. Chris Williams of PocketWatch compared Kaji to Nickelodeon's SpongeBob SquarePants.

At the American International Toy Fair 2018 in New York City, Kaji announced a line of toys, branded as Ryan's World, in cooperation with PocketWatch and Bonkers Toys. The toys were first released exclusively at Walmart on August 6, 2018.

The Ryan's World channel has been listed in 2018 and 2019 as the highest-earning YouTube channel by Forbes. The New York Times reported that the Kaji family earn at least $25 million from their "Ryan's World" merchandise sales, which totaled over $250 million in 2021.

=== Effect on YouTube content guidelines ===
On August 28, 2019, Truth in Advertising filed a complaint with the Federal Trade Commission (FTC) claiming that Ryan's World was not properly disclosing sponsored videos. Truth in Advertising claimed, "Nearly 90 percent of the Ryan ToysReview videos have included at least one paid product recommendation aimed at preschoolers, a group too young to distinguish between a commercial and a review." These advertisements often depicted unhealthy foods. The latter complaint resulted in the FTC suing YouTube and Google for $170 million; YouTube consequently adopted new rules on children's content to comply with the Children's Online Privacy Protection Act.

== Awards and nominations ==
Year	Award	Category	Work	Result	Ref(s)
2020	Streamy Awards	Subject: Kids and Family	Ryan's World	Won	
2021	Streamy Awards	Subject: Kids and Family	Ryan's World	Nominated	
2022	Kids' Choice Awards	Favorite Male Creator		Nominated	

== See also ==
- Ryan's Mystery Playdate
- Ryan's World the Movie: Titan Universe Adventure
