= PocketWatch, Inc. =

American digital media studio

- Type: Private
- Genre: Children and family
- Founded: 2017; 9 years ago
- Founder: Chris M. Williams
- Headquarters: Culver City, California, United States
- Owner: Chris M. Williams
- Website: pocket.watch

PocketWatch, Inc. (stylized as pocket.watch) is a privately-owned media production company that specializes in talent management, project financing, and merchandising for Generation Alpha-familiar influencers, with most originating from YouTube. Its offices and studio are based in Culver City, California. The company was founded in 2017 by former Maker Studios officer Chris M. Williams.

== History ==
PocketWatch was founded in 2017 as a firm designed to provide merchandising services alongside production funding for influencers familiar to Generation Alpha, with a targeted audience of children and tweens who are fans of partnered YouTubers. Of the many influencers signed include Ryan's World, HobbyKidsTV, and EvanTubeHD. The company's signed creators hold over a billion subscribers combined, with over 855 billion combined views in a month.

PocketWatch's executive team consists of former players in kids and family entertainment, private equity funding, and other industries, included are Albie Hecht, the former head of Nickelodeon Studios as Chief Content Officer, Brian Robbins, President of Kids and Family entertainment at Paramount Global, and Beatriz Acevedo, founder of online video network Mitu as Board Members for the company.

Variety named founder Williams as one of their Digital Innovators in 2019, with Williams additionally nominated for the Ernst & Young Entrepreneur of the Year competition that same year.

=== 2017 ===
In April 2017, PocketWatch signed HobbyKidsTV as their first creator partner. HobbyKids specializes in toy play, outdoor activities and other family-oriented content across 10 YouTube channels that have generated 7.5 billion views.

In August 2017, PocketWatch, Viacom, and SNL star, Kenan Thompson developed Skoogle, a live-action scripted children's comedy show. Later that year, PocketWatch partnered with the creator of The Fairly OddParents, Butch Hartman, to develop three original animated series, including one based on HobbyKidsTV.

In August 2017, PocketWatch signed CaptainSparklez, a video game and entertainment channel created and run by Jordan Maron, a YouTube personality.

In September 2017, the studio signed a long-term partnership with Ryan ToysReview. Ryan ToysReview is a well-known kids and family creator channel on YouTube in the United States and, according to Forbes magazine, was YouTube's highest-earning influencer in 2018.

In September 2017, PocketWatch signed EvanTubeHD and his family, primarily focused on the brother-sister combination of Evan and Jillian, the stars of the channel. Their videos have evolved since originally launching as a toy channel and an example of the toy unboxing trend, in which kids open up new toys on camera. Now the channel primarily consists of challenges, gameplay and other formats that feature the comradery and rivalry between Evan and Jillian. Their parents also frequently appear in videos as well.

PocketWatch expanded its reach beyond YouTube into publishing, television, film, and consumer goods. In November 2017, PocketWatch partnered with Simon & Schuster to publish children's books under a PocketWatch branded imprint and launched their first two books, Watch this Book! and Meet Ryan! in the winter of 2018.

=== 2018 ===
In February 2018, PocketWatch collaborated with Ryan ToysReview to create Ryan's World, a consumer products brand based on Ryan and a portfolio of characters created by Ryan and his parents. The first consumer products licensees for Ryan's World were The Bentex Group and Bonkers Toys. PocketWatch has also secured international licensing deals with licensing agencies and media companies in the U.K., Australia, and other countries expanding the line globally.

In August 2018, Ryan's World, launched exclusively at Walmart. The line included a giant golden mystery egg that sold out in 10 minutes on Black Friday 2018.

In October 2018, PocketWatch launched 90 22-minute episodes of repackaged content from their YouTube creator partners on Hulu and Amazon Prime Video and partnered with Paramount Pictures to license them to international distributors.

=== 2019 ===
PocketWatch unveiled 40 new licensing partnerships. The expansion of Ryan's World's licensing program was anchored by new licensees, including Just Play, Jada Toys, Kids Preferred, American Greetings, and Zak Designs and spanned new categories, including Halloween costumes, party goods, social expressions, sleepwear, backpacks, lunch kits and accessories, hydration, furniture, and home goods.

In January 2019, PocketWatch launched its gaming division P.W Games with their first mobile game in partnership with WildWorks, Tag With Ryan, a free-to-play, endless runner game featuring the likeness of Ryan and the many characters of Ryan's World. The game has been downloaded more than 5 million times since launching.

PocketWatch created, produced and launched their first television series Ryan's Mystery Playdate, a live-action show for preschoolers on Nickelodeon April 19, 2019. Ryan's Mystery Playdate launched to successful ratings and was renewed for a second season five days after the premiere on April 24. It has since become the number one series on television for preschoolers in the U.S.

In May 2019, PocketWatch signed deals with YouTube channels MarMar and Onyx Family to launch new programming.

In June 2019, PocketWatch launched HobbyKids Adventures, an original animated series created by Butch Hartman and based on their creator partners HobbyKidsTV, on YouTube.

In June 2019, PocketWatch partnered with Hardee's, as they relaunched their Star Pals kids meals after an eight-year hiatus with Ryan's World themed meals and a line of toys designed by Ryan ToysReview.

In July 2019, PocketWatch, under their P.W Games division, and Outright Games announced a partnership to release Race With Ryan the first console game to be released as part of Ryan's World, on PlayStation 4, Nintendo Switch, Xbox One and PC in November 2019.

=== 2020 ===
In February 2020, PocketWatch launched their advertising agency Clock.work, focused on child-targeted advertising across YouTube, mobile gaming and OTT channels.
