= List of accolades received by Life of Pi =

Accolades
Award	Won	Nominated
Academy Awards	4	11
Annie Awards	1	2
AACTA Awards	0	2
American Cinema Editors Awards	0	1
Art Directors Guild	1	1
AFI Awards	1	1
American Society of Cinematographers Awards	0	1
Alliance of Women Film Journalists	1	1
British Academy Film Awards	2	9
Broadcast Film Critics Association Awards 2012	2	9
Chicago Film Critics Association	0	1
Dallas-Fort Worth Film Critics Association	2	3
Directors Guild of America Awards	0	1
Dorian Awards	1	1
Golden Globe Awards	1	3
Golden Reel Awards	3	4
Grammy Awards	0	1
Houston Film Critics Society	0	3
International Film Music Critics Association Awards	1	4
International 3D Society	4	4
Irish Film & Television Awards	0	1
Kansas City Film Critics Circle Awards	1	1
London Film Critics' Circle Awards	2	2
MTV Movie Awards	1	2
North Texas Film Critics Association	1	1
12th New York Film Critics Online Awards	2	2
Online Film Critics Society	0	1
Palm Springs International Film Festival	1	1
Producers Guild of America Award	0	1
17th Satellite Awards	2	5
Saturn Awards	2	8
San Diego Film Critics Society	1	5
San Francisco Film Critics Circle	1	1
St. Louis Film Critics	1	5
USC Libraries Scripter Award	0	1
Visual Effects Society Awards	5	7
Washington D. C. Area Film Critics Association	1	2
Women Film Critics Circle	1	1
Writers Guild of America Awards	0	1
- Total number of awards and nominations
Totals	46	111
- References

Life of Pi is a 2012 American 3D adventure drama film based on Yann Martel's 2001 novel of the same name. Directed by Ang Lee, the film is based on an adapted screenplay by David Magee, and stars Suraj Sharma, Irrfan Khan, Gérard Depardieu, Tabu, and Adil Hussain.

The film premiered on September 28, 2012 as the opening film of the 50th New York Film Festival at the Lincoln Center in New York City, and had its wide-release on November 21, 2012.

== Awards and nominations ==
List of awards and nominations
Award	Category	Recipient(s)	Result
Academy Awards	Best Picture	Ang Lee, Gil Netter and David Womark	Nominated
Academy Awards	Best Director	Ang Lee	Won
Academy Awards	Best Adapted Screenplay	David Magee	Nominated
Academy Awards	Best Cinematography	Claudio Miranda	Won
Academy Awards	Best Film Editing	Tim Squyres	Nominated
Academy Awards	Best Original Score	Mychael Danna	Won
Academy Awards	Best Original Song	Mychael Danna and Bombay Jayashri for "Pi's Lullaby"	Nominated
Academy Awards	Best Production Design	Production Design: David Gropman; Set Decoration: Anna Pinnock	Nominated
Academy Awards	Best Sound Editing	Eugene Gearty and Philip Stockton	Nominated
Academy Awards	Best Sound Mixing	Ron Bartlett, D. M. Hemphill and Drew Kunin	Nominated
Academy Awards	Best Visual Effects	Bill Westenhofer, Guillaume Rocheron, Erik-Jan de Boer and Donald R. Elliott	Won
Annie Awards	Character Animation in a Live Action Production	Orangutan – Erik-Jan de Boer, Amanda Dague, Matt Brown, Mary Lynn Machado, Aaron Grey	Nominated
Annie Awards	Character Animation in a Live Action Production	Tiger – Erik-Jan de Boer, Matt Shumway, Brian Wells, Vinayak Pawar, Michael Holzl	Won
AACTA International Awards	Best Film	Ang Lee, Gil Netter, David Womark	Nominated
AACTA International Awards	Best Direction	Ang Lee	Nominated
American Cinema Editors Awards	Best Edited Feature Film (Dramatic)	Tim Squyres	Nominated
Art Directors Guild	Excellence in Production Design for a Feature Film	David Gropman	Won
AFI Awards	Movies of the Year	Ang Lee, Gil Netter, and David Womark	Won
American Society of Cinematographers Awards	Outstanding Achievement in Cinematography	Claudio Miranda	Nominated
Alliance of Women Film Journalists	Best Cinematography	Claudio Miranda	Won
British Academy Film Awards	Best Picture	Ang Lee, Gil Netter, David Womark	Nominated
British Academy Film Awards	Director	Ang Lee	Nominated
British Academy Film Awards	Adapted Screenplay	David Magee	Nominated
British Academy Film Awards	Cinematography	Claudio Miranda	Won
British Academy Film Awards	Production Design	David Gropman, Anna Pinnock	Nominated
British Academy Film Awards	Editing	Tim Squyres	Nominated
British Academy Film Awards	Sound	Drew Kunin, Eugene Gearty, Philip Stockton, Ron Bartlett, D. M. Hemphill	Nominated
British Academy Film Awards	Special Visual Effects	Bill Westenhofer, Guillaume Rocheron, Erik-Jan de Boer, Donald R. Elliott	Won
British Academy Film Awards	Original Music	Mychael Danna	Nominated
Broadcast Film Critics Association Awards 2012	Best Picture		Nominated
Broadcast Film Critics Association Awards 2012	Best Director	Ang Lee	Nominated
Broadcast Film Critics Association Awards 2012	Young Actor	Suraj Sharma	Nominated
Broadcast Film Critics Association Awards 2012	Best Adapted Screenplay	David Magee	Nominated
Broadcast Film Critics Association Awards 2012	Best Cinematography	Claudio Miranda	Won
Broadcast Film Critics Association Awards 2012	Best Art Direction	David Gropman/Production Designer; Anna Pinnock/Set Decorator	Nominated
Broadcast Film Critics Association Awards 2012	Best Editing	Tim Squyres	Nominated
Broadcast Film Critics Association Awards 2012	Best Visual Effects		Won
Broadcast Film Critics Association Awards 2012	Best Score	Mychael Danna	Nominated
Chicago Film Critics Association	Best Cinematography	Claudio Miranda	Nominated
Dallas-Fort Worth Film Critics Association	Top Ten Films		Won
Dallas-Fort Worth Film Critics Association	Best Director	Ang Lee	Nominated
Dallas-Fort Worth Film Critics Association	Best Cinematography	Claudio Miranda	Won
Directors Guild of America Awards	Outstanding Directorial Achievement in Feature Film	Ang Lee	Nominated
Dorian Awards	Visually Striking Film of the Year		Won
Golden Globe Awards	Best Motion Picture – Drama		Nominated
Golden Globe Awards	Best Director	Ang Lee	Nominated
Golden Globe Awards	Best Original Score	Mychael Danna	Won
Golden Reel Awards	Filmmaker Award	Ang Lee	Won
Golden Reel Awards	Best Sound Editing: Music in a Feature Film	Music Editor: Erich Stratmann; Additional Music Editor: Mitch Bederman	Won
Golden Reel Awards	Best Sound Editing: Dialogue and ADR in a Feature Film	Supervising Sound Editors: Eugene Gearty, Philip Stockton; Supervising ADR Editor: Kenton Jakub	Won
Golden Reel Awards	Best Sound Editing: Sound Effects and Foley in a Feature Film	Supervising Sound Editor: Philip Stockton; Sound Designer: Eugene Gearty; Supervising Foley Editor: Frank Kern; Foley Artist: Marko Constanzo; Editors: Kam Chan, Jamie Baker	Nominated
Grammy Awards	Best Score Soundtrack for Visual Media	Mychael Danna	Nominated
Houston Film Critics Society	Best Cinematography	Claudio Miranda	Nominated
Houston Film Critics Society	Best Original Score	Mychael Danna	Nominated
Houston Film Critics Society	Technical Achievement		Nominated
International Film Music Critics Association Awards	Film Score of the Year	Mychael Danna	Won
International Film Music Critics Association Awards	Film Composer of the Year	Mychael Danna	Nominated
International Film Music Critics Association Awards	Best Original Score for a Drama Film	Mychael Danna	Nominated
International Film Music Critics Association Awards	Film Music Composition of the Year – Pi's Lullaby	Mychael Danna and Bombay Jayashri	Nominated
International 3D Society	Live Action 3D Feature		Won
International 3D Society	Stereography – Live Action		Won
International 3D Society	3D Moment of the Year	"Fish Flying Over Boat"	Won
International 3D Society	Harold Lloyd Award	Ang Lee	Won
Irish Film & Television Awards	International Film		Nominated
Kansas City Film Critics Circle Awards	Best Director	Ang Lee	Won
London Film Critics' Circle Awards	Director of the Year	Ang Lee	Won
London Film Critics' Circle Awards	Technical Achievement	Bill Westenhofer	Won
MTV Movie Awards	Breakthrough Performance	Suraj Sharma	Nominated
MTV Movie Awards	Best Scared-As-S**T Performance	Suraj Sharma	Won
North Texas Film Critics Association	Best Cinematography	Claudio Miranda	Won
12th New York Film Critics Online Awards	Top 10 Films of 2012		Won
12th New York Film Critics Online Awards	Best Cinematography	Claudio Miranda	Won
Online Film Critics Society	Best Cinematography	Claudio Miranda	Nominated
Palm Springs International Film Festival	Frederick Loewe Award	Mychael Danna	Won
Producers Guild of America Award	Outstanding Producer of Theatrical Motion Pictures	Ang Lee, Gil Netter, and David Womark	Nominated
17th Satellite Awards	Best Picture		Nominated
17th Satellite Awards	Adapted Screenplay	David Magee	Won
17th Satellite Awards	Best Cinematography	Claudio Miranda	Won
17th Satellite Awards	Best Sound Mixing & Editing	Drew Kunin, Eugene Gearty, Philip Stockton	Nominated
17th Satellite Awards	Best Visual Effects	Bill Westenhofer	Nominated
Saturn Awards	Best Fantasy Film		Won
Saturn Awards	Best Director	Ang Lee	Nominated
Saturn Awards	Best Writing	David Magee	Nominated
Saturn Awards	Best Production Design	David Gropman	Nominated
Saturn Awards	Best Editing	Tim Squyres	Nominated
Saturn Awards	Best Visual Effects	Bill Westenhofer, Guillaume Rocheron, Erik-Jan de Boer, and Donald R. Elliott	Nominated
Saturn Awards	Best Music	Mychael Danna	Nominated
Saturn Awards	Best Performance by a Younger Actor	Suraj Sharma	Won
San Diego Film Critics Society	Best Director	Ang Lee	Nominated
San Diego Film Critics Society	Best Adapted Screenplay	David Magee	Nominated
San Diego Film Critics Society	Best Cinematography	Claudio Miranda	Won
San Diego Film Critics Society	Best Editing	Tim Squyres	Nominated
San Diego Film Critics Society	Best Score	Mychael Danna	Nominated
San Francisco Film Critics Circle	Best Cinematography	Claudio Miranda	Won
St. Louis Film Critics	Best Film		Nominated
St. Louis Film Critics	Best Director	Ang Lee	Nominated
St. Louis Film Critics	Best Adapted Screenplay	David Magee	Nominated
St. Louis Film Critics	Best Cinematography	Claudio Miranda	Nominated
St. Louis Film Critics	Best Visual Effects		Won
USC Libraries Scripter Award	Scripter Award	David Magee	Nominated
Visual Effects Society Awards	VES Visionary Award	Ang Lee	Won
Visual Effects Society Awards	Outstanding Visual Effects in a Visual Effects – Driven Feature Motion Picture	Thomas Fisher, Susan Macleod, Guillaume Rocheron, Bill Westenhofer	Won
Visual Effects Society Awards	Outstanding Animated Character in a Live Action Feature Motion Picture	Richard Parker – Erik-Jan de Boer, Sean Comer, Betsy Asher Hall, Kai-Hua Lan	Won
Visual Effects Society Awards	Outstanding Created Environment in a Live Action Feature Motion Picture	Open Ocean – Jason Bayever, Sho Hasegawa, Jimmy Jewell, Walt Jones	Nominated
Visual Effects Society Awards	Outstanding FX and Simulation Animation in a Live Action Feature Motion Picture	Storm of God – Harry Mukhopadhyay, David Stopford, Mark Williams, Derek Wolfe	Won
Visual Effects Society Awards	Outstanding FX and Simulation Animation in a Live Action Feature Motion Picture	Ocean – Jason Bayever, David Horsley, Scott Townsend, Miles Vignol	Nominated
Visual Effects Society Awards	Outstanding Compositing in a Feature Motion Picture	Storm of God – Ryan Clarke, Jose Fernandez, Sean Oharas, Hamish Schumacher	Won
Washington D. C. Area Film Critics Association	Best Adapted Screenplay	David Magee	Nominated
Washington D. C. Area Film Critics Association	Best Cinematography	Claudio Miranda	Won
Women Film Critics Circle	Best Family Film	Life of Pi – Tied with Rise of the Guardians	Won
Writers Guild of America Award	Adapted Screenplay	David Magee	Nominated
