= 66th British Academy Film Awards =

2013 film award ceremony

- Date: 10 February 2013
- Site: Royal Opera House, London
- Hosted by: Stephen Fry

Highlights
- Best Film: Argo
- Best British Film: Skyfall
- Best Actor: Daniel Day-Lewis; Lincoln
- Best Actress: Emmanuelle Riva; Amour
- Most awards: Les Misérables (4)
- Most nominations: Lincoln (10)

The 66th British Academy Film Awards, more commonly known as the BAFTAs, were held on 10 February 2013 at the Royal Opera House in London, honouring the best national and foreign films of 2012. The nominations were announced on 9 January 2013. Presented by the British Academy of Film and Television Arts, accolades were handed out for the best feature-length film and documentaries of any nationality that were screened at British cinemas in 2012.

Stephen Fry hosted the ceremony, where Argo won Best Film and Best Director for Ben Affleck. Daniel Day-Lewis won Best Actor for Lincoln and Emmanuelle Riva won Best Actress for Amour. Christoph Waltz won Best Supporting Actor for Django Unchained and Anne Hathaway won Best Supporting Actress for Les Misérables. Skyfall, directed by Sam Mendes, was voted Outstanding British Film of 2012. Sir Alan Parker received the BAFTA Fellowship and Tessa Ross garnered the BAFTA Outstanding British Contribution to Cinema Award.

== Winners and nominees ==
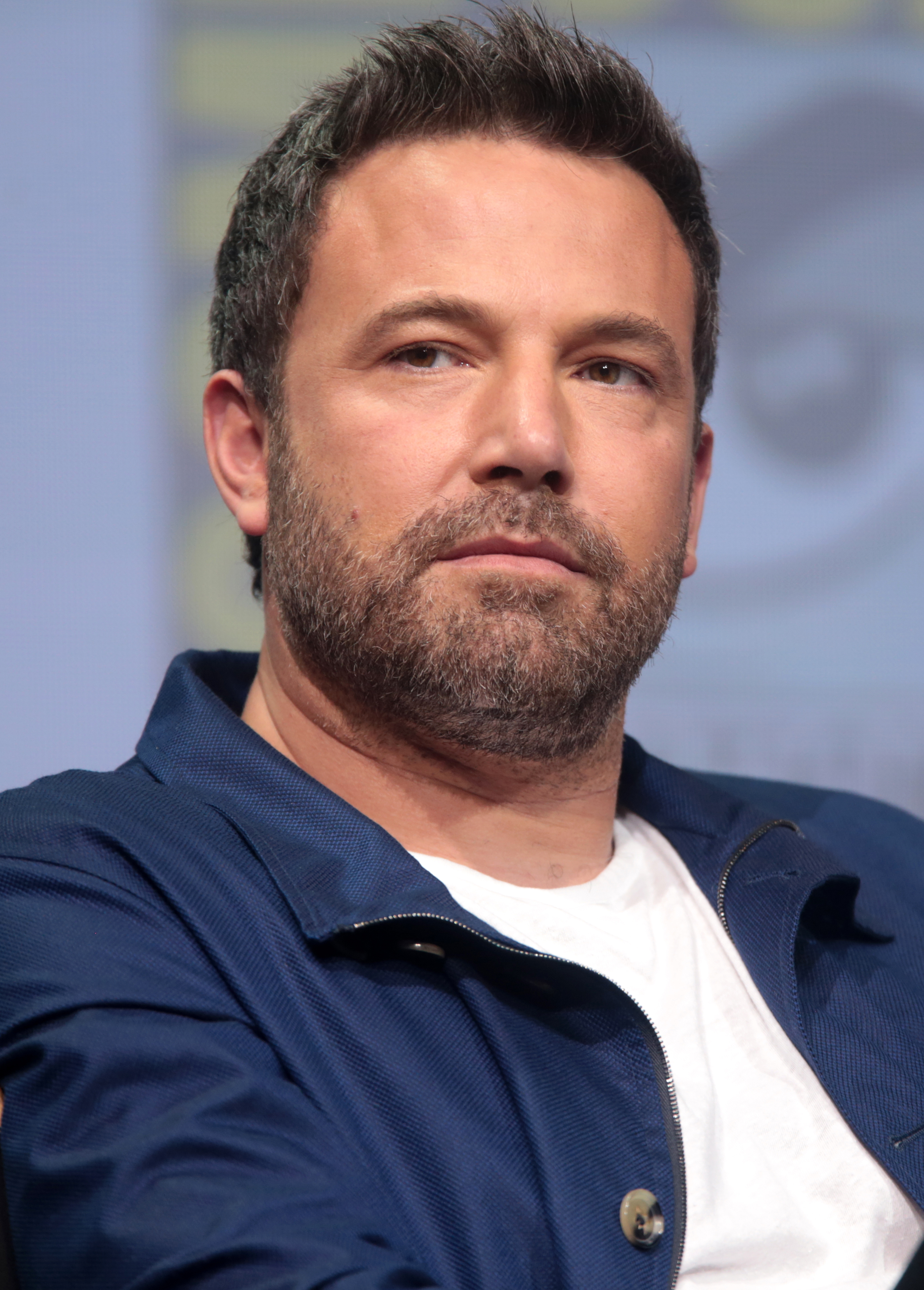
Ben Affleck, Best Director winner

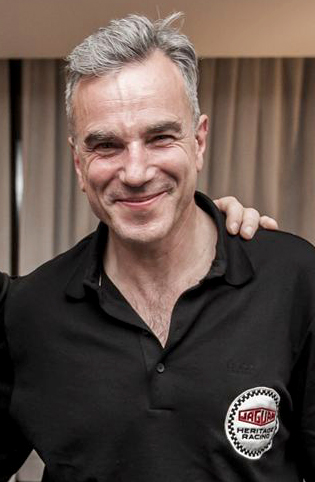
Daniel Day-Lewis, Best Actor winner

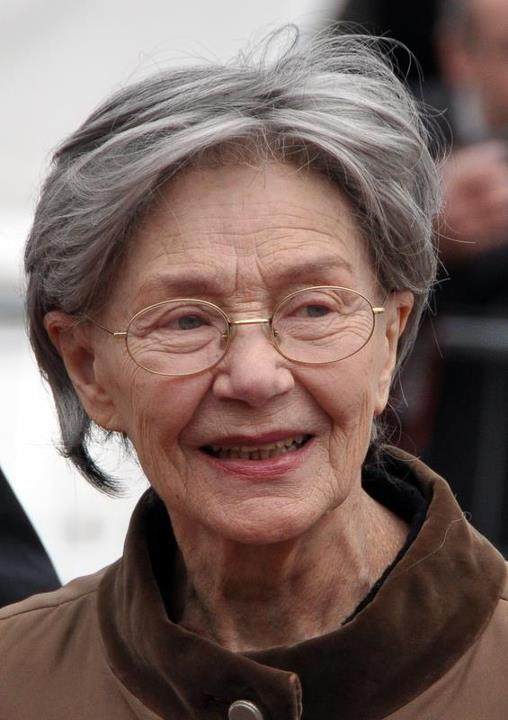
Emmanuelle Riva, Best Actress winner

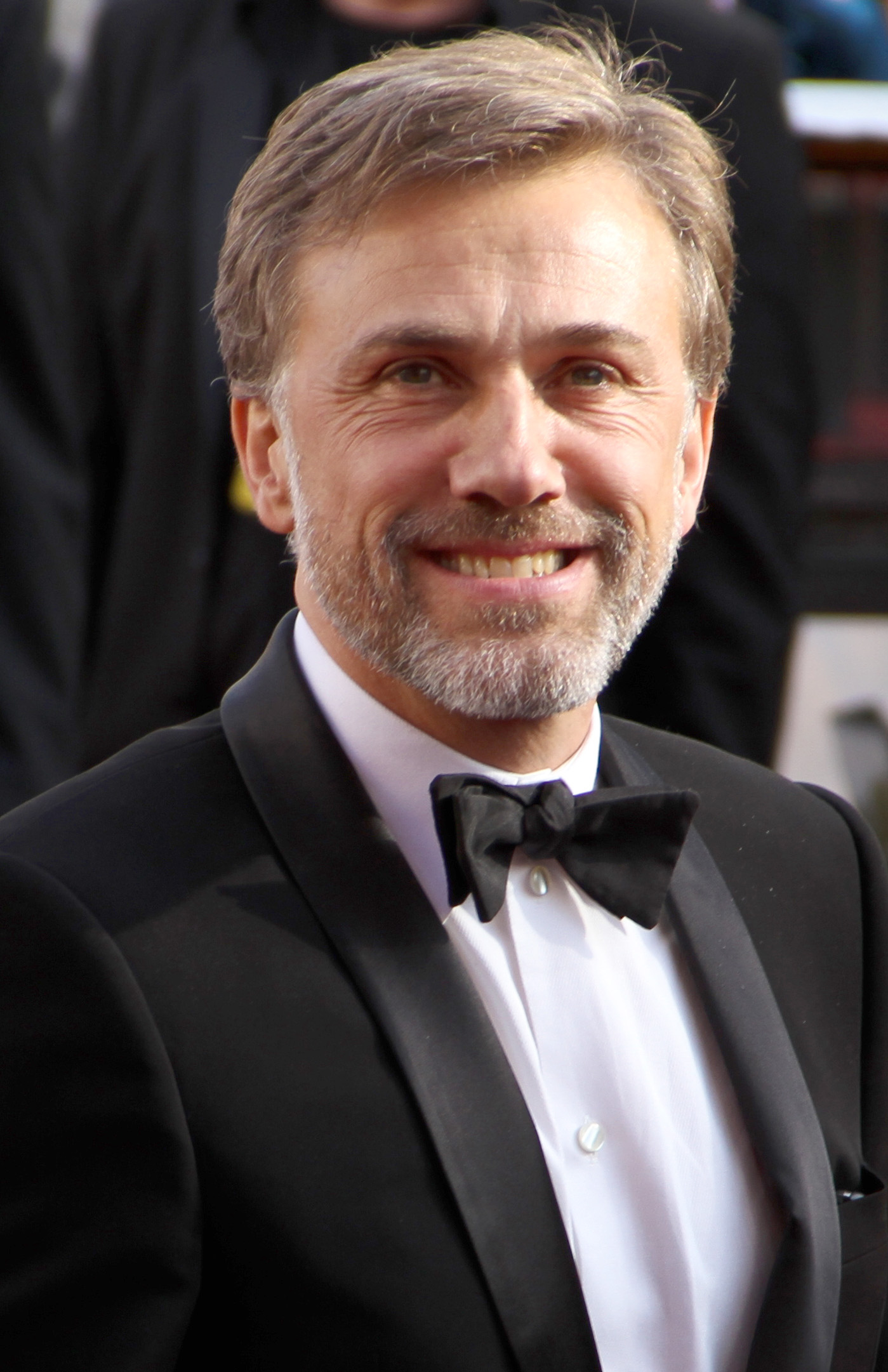
Christoph Waltz, Best Supporting Actor winner

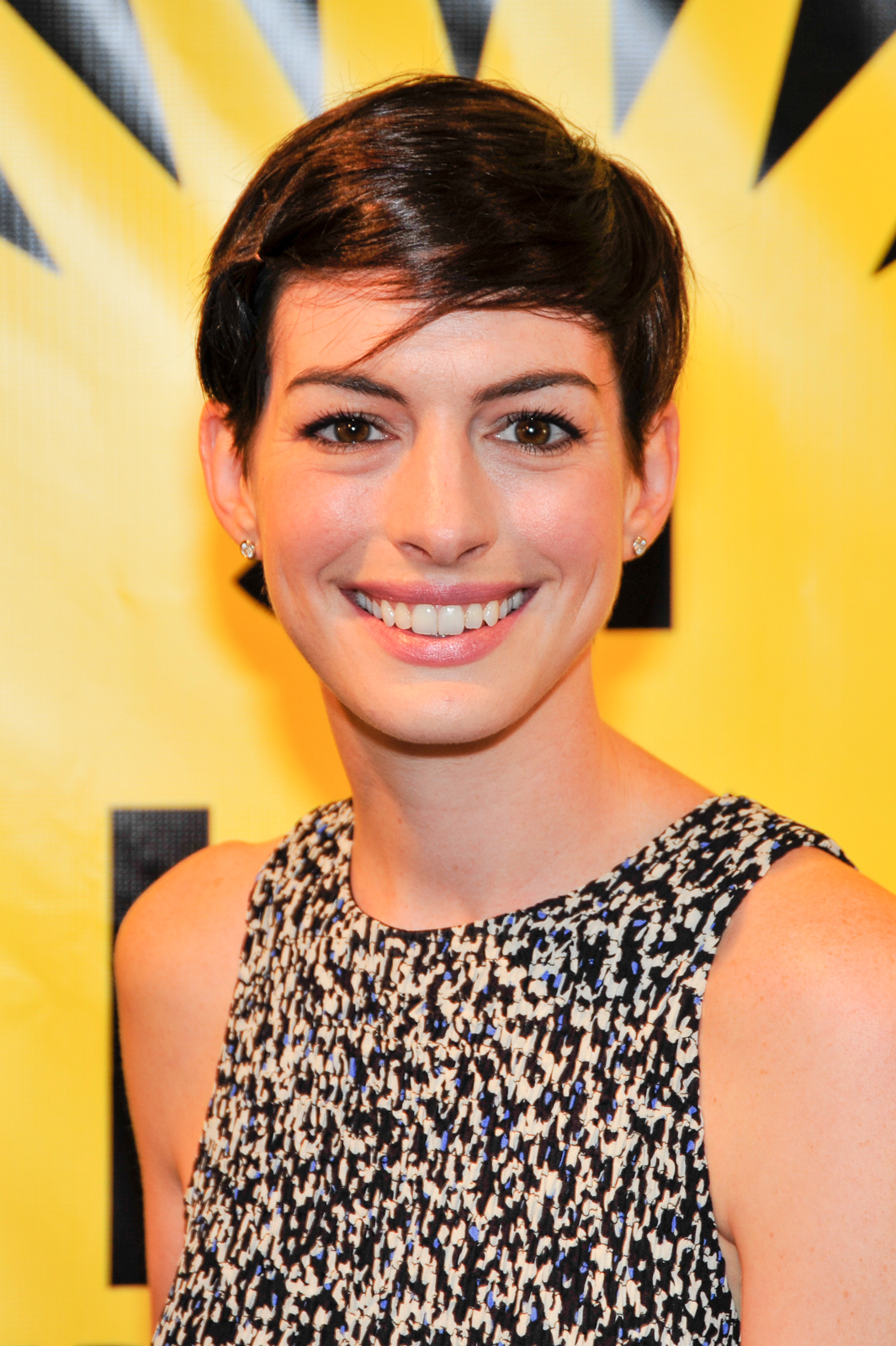
Anne Hathaway, Best Supporting Actress winner

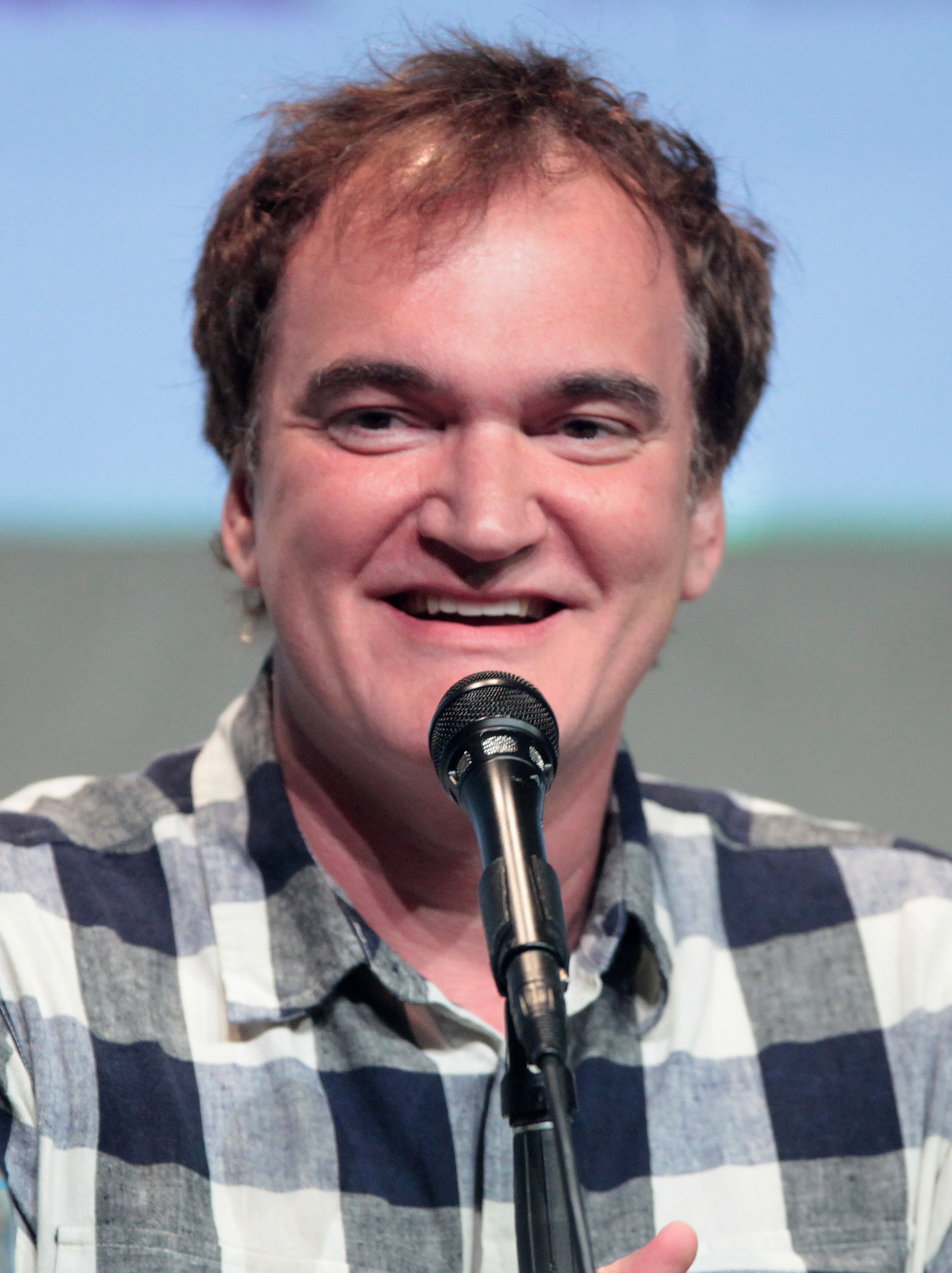
Quentin Tarantino, Best Original Screenplay winner

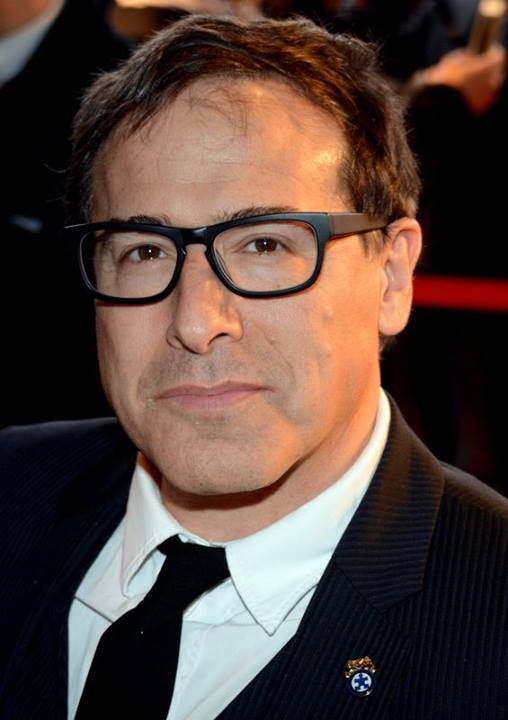
David O. Russell, Best Adapted Screenplay winner

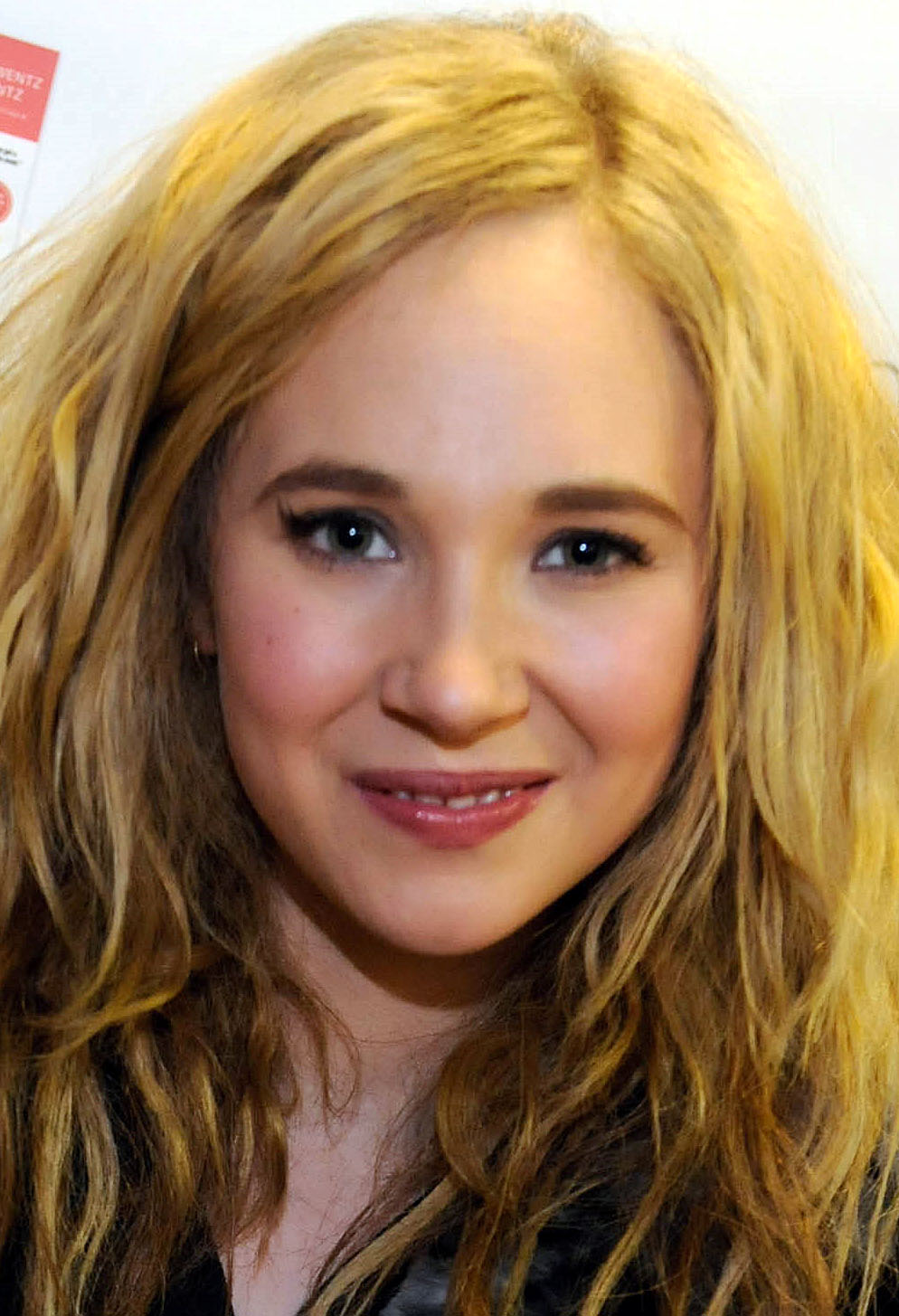
Juno Temple, EE Rising Star Award winner

=== BAFTA Fellowship ===
- **Sir Alan Parker**

=== Outstanding British Contribution to Cinema ===
- **Tessa Ross**

=== BAFTA Special Award ===
- **Her Majesty The Queen** and **Run Run Shaw**

=== Awards ===
Winners are listed first and highlighted in boldface.

**Best Film**: **Argo – Grant Heslov, Ben Affleck and George Clooney**; Les Misérables – Tim Bevan, Eric Fellner, Debra Hayward and Cameron Mackintosh; Life of Pi – Gil Netter, Ang Lee and David Womark; Lincoln – Steven Spielberg and Kathleen Kennedy; Zero Dark Thirty – Mark Boal, Kathryn Bigelow and Megan Ellison	**Best Direction**: **Ben Affleck – Argo**; Kathryn Bigelow – Zero Dark Thirty; Michael Haneke – Amour; Ang Lee – Life of Pi; Quentin Tarantino – Django Unchained
**Best Actor in a Leading Role**: **Daniel Day-Lewis – Lincoln as Abraham Lincoln**; Ben Affleck – Argo as Tony Mendez; Bradley Cooper – Silver Linings Playbook as Patrizio Solitano Jr.; Hugh Jackman – Les Misérables as Jean Valjean; Joaquin Phoenix – The Master as Freddie Quell	**Best Actress in a Leading Role**: **Emmanuelle Riva – Amour as Anne Laurent**; Jessica Chastain – Zero Dark Thirty as Maya Harris; Marion Cotillard – Rust and Bone as Stephanie; Jennifer Lawrence – Silver Linings Playbook as Tiffany Maxwell; Helen Mirren – Hitchcock as Alma Reville
**Best Actor in a Supporting Role**: **Christoph Waltz – Django Unchained as King Schultz**; Alan Arkin – Argo as Lester Siegel; Javier Bardem – Skyfall as Raoul Silva; Philip Seymour Hoffman – The Master as Lancaster Dodd; Tommy Lee Jones – Lincoln as Thaddeus Stevens	**Best Actress in a Supporting Role**: **Anne Hathaway – Les Misérables as Fantine**; Amy Adams – The Master as Peggy Dodd; Judi Dench – Skyfall as M; Sally Field – Lincoln as Mary Todd Lincoln; Helen Hunt – The Sessions as Cheryl Cohen-Greene
**Best Original Screenplay**: **Django Unchained – Quentin Tarantino**; Amour – Michael Haneke; The Master – Paul Thomas Anderson; Moonrise Kingdom – Wes Anderson and Roman Coppola; Zero Dark Thirty – Mark Boal	**Best Adapted Screenplay**: **Silver Linings Playbook – David O. Russell**; Argo – Chris Terrio; Beasts of the Southern Wild – Lucy Alibar and Benh Zeitlin; Life of Pi – David Magee; Lincoln – Tony Kushner
**Best Cinematography**: **Life of Pi – Claudio Miranda**; Anna Karenina – Seamus McGarvey; Les Misérables – Danny Cohen; Lincoln – Janusz Kamiński; Skyfall – Roger Deakins	**Best Costume Design**: **Anna Karenina – Jacqueline Durran**; Great Expectations – Beatrix Aruna Pasztor; Les Misérables – Paco Delgado; Lincoln – Joanna Johnston; Snow White and the Huntsman – Colleen Atwood
**Best Editing**: **Argo – William Goldenberg**; Django Unchained – Fred Raskin; Life of Pi – Tim Squyres; Skyfall – Stuart Baird; Zero Dark Thirty – Dylan Tichenor and William Goldenberg	**Best Makeup and Hair**: **Les Misérables – Lisa Westcott**; Anna Karenina – Ivana Primorac; Hitchcock – Julie Hewett, Martin Samuel and Howard Berger; The Hobbit: An Unexpected Journey – Peter King, Richard Taylor and Rick Findlater; Lincoln – Lois Burwell and Kay Georgiou
**Best Original Music**: **Skyfall – Thomas Newman**; Anna Karenina – Dario Marianelli; Argo – Alexandre Desplat; Life of Pi – Mychael Danna; Lincoln – John Williams	**Best Production Design**: **Les Misérables – Eve Stewart and Anna Lynch-Robinson**; Anna Karenina – Sarah Greenwood and Katie Spencer; Life of Pi – David Gropman and Anna Pinnock; Lincoln – Rick Carter and Jim Erickson; Skyfall – Dennis Gassner and Anna Pinnock
**Best Sound**: **Les Misérables – Simon Hayes, Andy Nelson, Mark Paterson, Jonathan Allen, Lee Walpole and John Warhurst**; Django Unchained – Mark Ulano, Michael Minkler, Tony Lamberti and Wylie Stateman; The Hobbit: An Unexpected Journey – Tony Johnson, Christopher Boyes, Michael Hedges, Michael Semanick, Brent Burge and Chris Ward; Life of Pi – Drew Kunin, Eugene Gearty, Philip Stockton, Ron Bartlett and Doug Hemphill; Skyfall – Stuart Wilson, Scott Millan, Greg P. Russell, Per Hallberg and Karen Baker Landers	**Best Special Visual Effects**: **Life of Pi – Bill Westenhofer, Guillaume Rocheron, Erik-Jan de Boer and Donald R. Elliott**; The Avengers – Janek Sirrs, Jeff White, Guy Williams and Dan Sudick; The Dark Knight Rises – Paul Franklin, Chris Corbould, Peter Bebb and Andrew Lockley; The Hobbit: An Unexpected Journey – Joe Letteri, Eric Saindon, David Clayton and R. Christopher White; Prometheus – Richard Stammers, Charley Henley, Trevor Wood and Paul Butterworth
**Outstanding British Film**: **Skyfall – Sam Mendes, Michael G. Wilson, Barbara Broccoli, Neal Purvis, Robert Wade and John Logan**; Anna Karenina – Joe Wright, Tim Bevan, Eric Fellner, Paul Webster and Tom Stoppard; The Best Exotic Marigold Hotel – John Madden, Graham Broadbent, Peter Czernin and Ol Parker; Les Misérables – Tom Hooper, Tim Bevan, Eric Fellner, Debra Hayward, Cameron Mackintosh, William Nicholson, Alain Boublil, Claude-Michel Schönberg; Seven Psychopaths – Martin McDonagh, Graham Broadbent and Peter Czernin	**Outstanding Debut by a British Writer, Director or Producer**: **The Imposter – Bart Layton (Director) and Dimitri Doganis (Producer)**; I Am Nasrine – Tina Gharavi (Writer/Director); McCullin – David Morris (Director) and Jacqui Morris (Director/Producer); The Muppets – James Bobin (Director); Wild Bill – Dexter Fletcher (Writer/Director) and Danny King (Writer)
**Best Short Animation**: **The Making of Longbird – Will Anderson and Ainslie Henderson**; Here to Fall – Kris Kelly and Evelyn McGrath; I'm Fine Thanks – Eamonn O'Neill	**Best Short Film**: **Swimmer – Lynne Ramsay, Peter Carlton and Diarmid Scrimshaw**; The Curse – Fyzal Boulifa and Gavin Humphries; Good Night – Muriel D. Ansembourg and Eva Sigurdardottir; Tumult – Johnny Barrington and Rhianna Andrews; The Voorman Problem – Mark Gill and Baldwin Li
**Best Animated Film**: **Brave – Mark Andrews and Brenda Chapman**; Frankenweenie – Tim Burton; ParaNorman – Sam Fell and Chris Butler	**Best Documentary**: **Searching for Sugar Man – Malik Bendjelloul and Simon Chinn**; The Imposter – Bart Layton and Dimitri Doganis; Marley – Kevin Macdonald, Steve Bing and Charles Steel; McCullin – David Morris and Jacqui Morris; West of Memphis – Amy J. Berg
**Best Film Not in the English Language**: **Amour – Michael Haneke and Margaret Ménégoz**; Headhunters – Morten Tyldum, Marianne Gray and Asle Vatn; The Hunt – Thomas Vinterberg, Sisse Graum Jørgensen and Marten Kaufmann; Rust and Bone – Jacques Audiard and Pascal Caucheteux; The Intouchables – Éric Toledano, Olivier Nakache, Nicolas Duval Adassovsky, Yann Zenou and Laurent Zeitoun	**Rising Star Award**: **Juno Temple**; Elizabeth Olsen; Andrea Riseborough; Suraj Sharma; Alicia Vikander

== Statistics ==
Films that received multiple nominations
Nominations	Film
10	Lincoln
9	Les Misérables
9	Life of Pi
8	Skyfall
7	Argo
6	Anna Karenina
5	Django Unchained
5	Zero Dark Thirty
4	Amour
4	The Master
3	The Hobbit: An Unexpected Journey
3	Silver Linings Playbook
2	Hitchcock
2	The Imposter
2	McCullin
2	Rust and Bone

Films that received multiple awards
Awards	Film
4	Les Misérables
3	Argo
2	Amour
2	Django Unchained
2	Life of Pi
2	Skyfall

== In Memoriam ==
- Marvin Hamlisch
- Jake Eberts
- Ravi Shankar
- Celeste Holm
- Michael Winner
- Ernest Borgnine
- Frank Pierson
- Sylvia Kristel
- Herbert Lom
- Cornel Lucas
- Robert Fuest
- Dinah Sheridan
- Chris Challis
- Charles Durning
- Nora Ephron
- Joyce Redman
- Richard Zanuck
- Patricia Medina
- Chris Marker
- Martin Poll
- Stuart Freeborn
- Richard Rodney Bennett
- Bruce Surtees
- Michael Clarke Duncan
- Tony Scott

== See also ==
- 2nd AACTA International Awards
- 85th Academy Awards
- 38th César Awards
- 18th Critics' Choice Awards
- 65th Directors Guild of America Awards
- 26th European Film Awards
- 70th Golden Globe Awards
- 33rd Golden Raspberry Awards
- 27th Goya Awards
- 28th Independent Spirit Awards
- 18th Lumière Awards
- 3rd Magritte Awards
- 24th Producers Guild of America Awards
- 17th Satellite Awards
- 39th Saturn Awards
- 19th Screen Actors Guild Awards
- 65th Writers Guild of America Awards
