= Life of Pi (disambiguation) =

Life of Pi is a 2001 philosophical novel by Yann Martel.

Life of Pi may also refer to:

- Life of Pi (film), 2012 adventure-drama film based on the novel
  - Life of Pi (soundtrack), soundtrack to the 2012 film
- Life of Pi (play), 2019 play based on the novel
