= 39th Saturn Awards =

US film and television award ceremony

- Date: June 26, 2013
- Site: California, U.S.
- Hosted by: Wayne Brady

Highlights
- Most awards: The Avengers (4)
- Most nominations: The Hobbit: An Unexpected Journey (9)

The 39th Saturn Awards, honoring the best in science fiction, fantasy and horror film and television in 2012, were held on June 26, 2013, and hosted by Wayne Brady. The awards were presented by the Academy of Science Fiction, Fantasy and Horror Films.

The seven Best Film Award categories were respectively won by The Avengers (Science Fiction), Life of Pi (Fantasy), The Cabin in the Woods (Horror or Thriller), Skyfall (Action or Adventure), Headhunters (International), Killer Joe (Independent) and Frankenweenie (Animated). The Avengers led the winners with four wins.

In the television categories, Breaking Bad won three of its four nominations, including Best Television Presentation. Revolution, The Walking Dead and Teen Wolf won the other Best Series Awards.

The ceremony was dedicated to the memory of author Richard Matheson, who died just days prior to being set to receive the Visionary Award. Other honorees included Lifetime Achievement Award recipient and filmmaker William Friedkin, Life Career Award recipient and actor/director Jonathan Frakes and the Dan Curtis Legacy Award recipient and producer/creator Vince Gilligan.

== Winners and nominees ==
=== Film ===
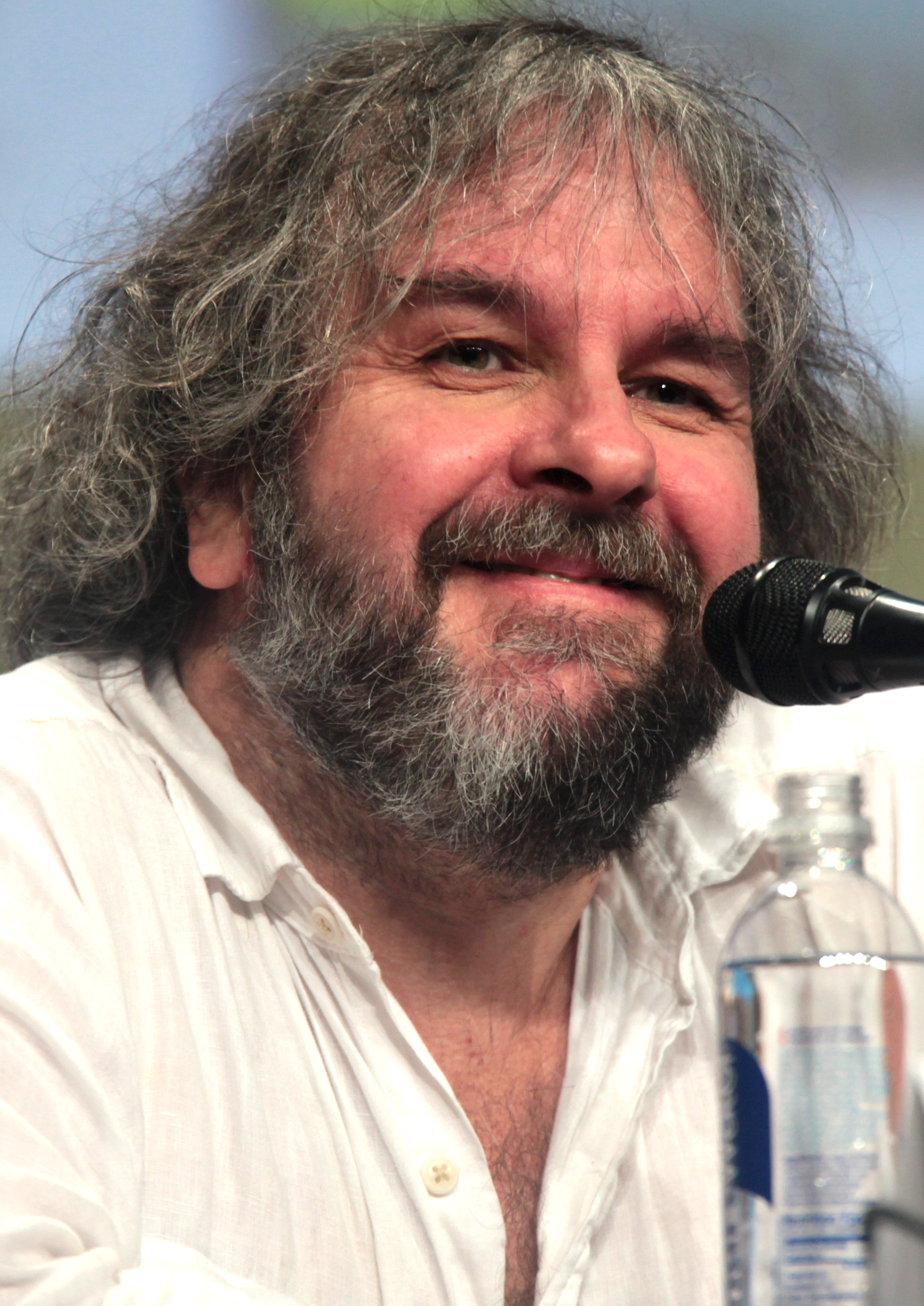
Peter Jackson, director, producer and co-writer of The Hobbit: An Unexpected Journey, which received the most nominations with nine, including Best Fantasy Film and Best Director.

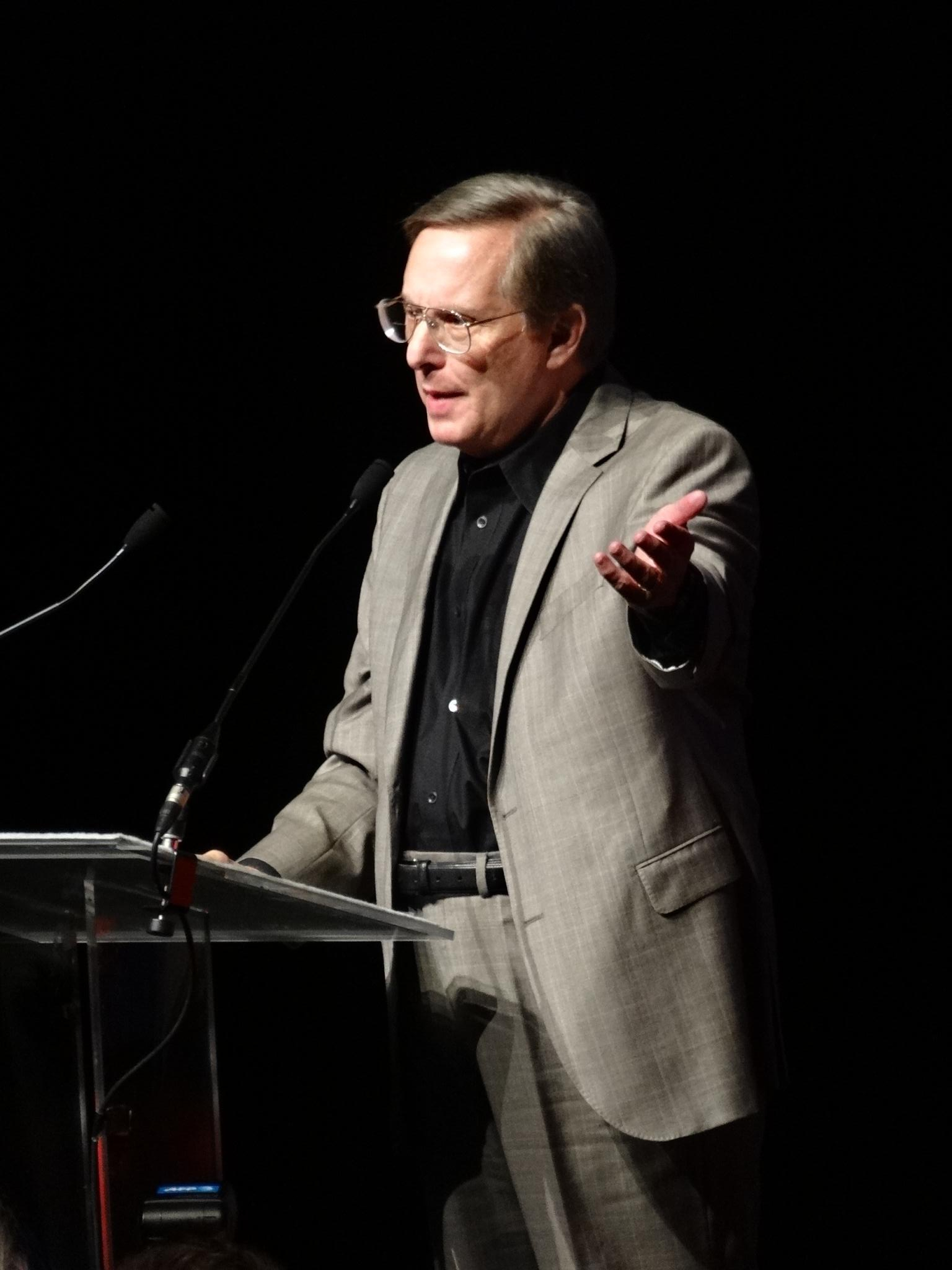
For his film Killer Joe, William Friedkin earned a Best Director nomination, 21 years after receiving The George Pal Memorial Award for his overall career.

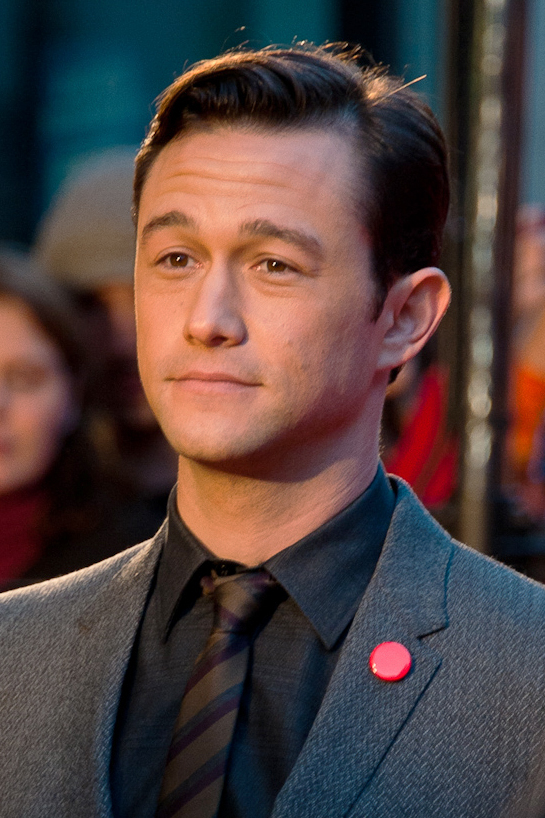
Joseph Gordon-Levitt earned a Best Actor nomination for Looper, and a Best Supporting Actor nomination for The Dark Knight Rises.

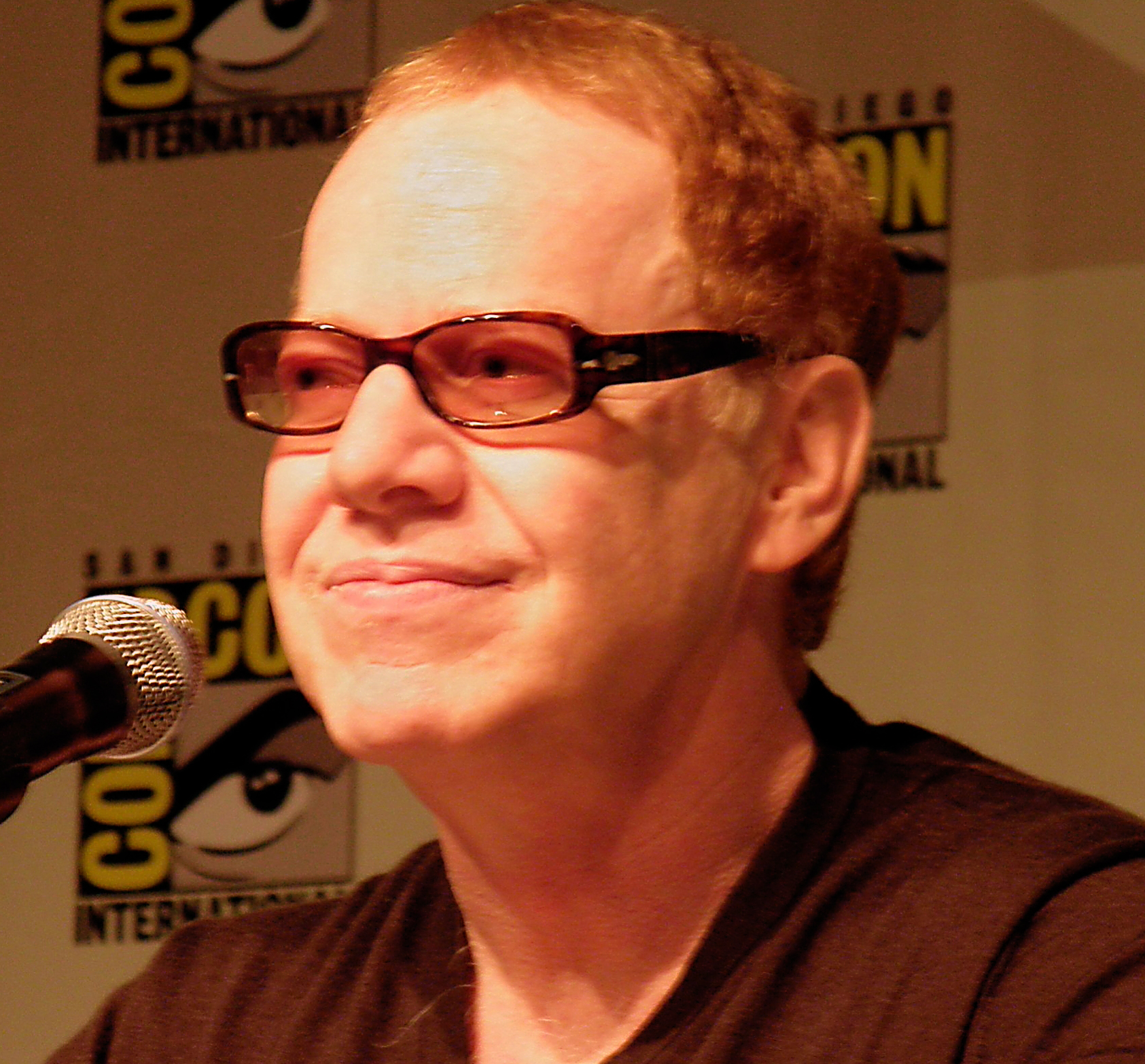
Danny Elfman won his sixth Best Music Award for Frankenweenie. This was his thirteenth nomination in the category.

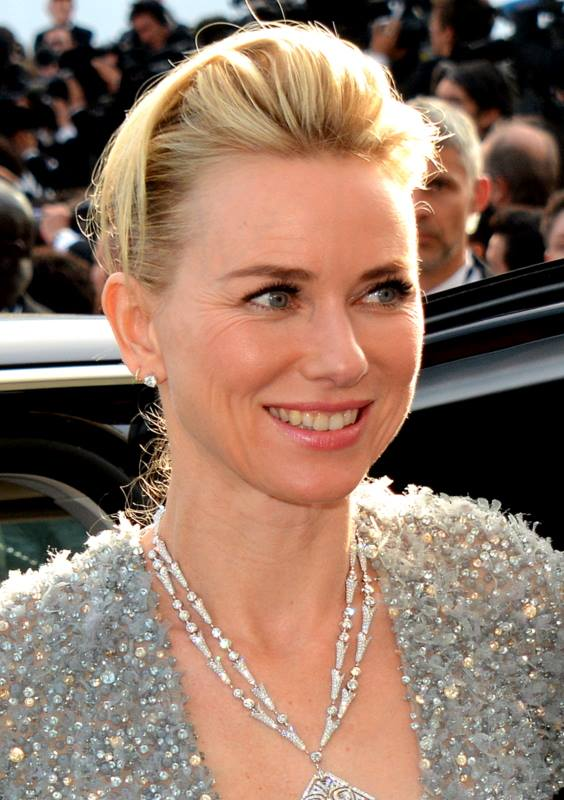
By earning her fifth Best Actress nomination for The Impossible, Naomi Watts tied the record for the most Best Actress nominations.

Best Science Fiction Film	Best Fantasy Film
The Avengers; Chronicle; Cloud Atlas; The Hunger Games; Looper; Prometheus	Life of Pi; The Amazing Spider-Man; The Hobbit: An Unexpected Journey; Ruby Sparks; Snow White and the Huntsman; Ted
Best Horror or Thriller Film	Best Action or Adventure Film
The Cabin in the Woods; Argo; The Impossible; Seven Psychopaths; The Woman in Black; Zero Dark Thirty	Skyfall; The Bourne Legacy; The Dark Knight Rises; Django Unchained; Les Misérables; Taken 2
Best Director	Best Writing
Joss Whedon – The Avengers; William Friedkin – Killer Joe; Peter Jackson – The Hobbit: An Unexpected Journey; Rian Johnson – Looper; Ang Lee – Life of Pi; Christopher Nolan – The Dark Knight Rises	Quentin Tarantino – Django Unchained; Tracy Letts – Killer Joe; Martin McDonagh – Seven Psychopaths; David Magee – Life of Pi; Joss Whedon – The Avengers; Joss Whedon and Drew Goddard – The Cabin in the Woods
Best Actor	Best Actress
Matthew McConaughey – Killer Joe as Killer Joe; Christian Bale – The Dark Knight Rises as Bruce Wayne / Batman; Daniel Craig – Skyfall as James Bond; Martin Freeman – The Hobbit: An Unexpected Journey as Bilbo Baggins; Hugh Jackman – Les Misérables as Jean Valjean; Joseph Gordon-Levitt – Looper as Joseph "Joe" Simmons	Jennifer Lawrence – The Hunger Games as Katniss Everdeen; Jessica Chastain – Zero Dark Thirty as Maya Harris; Ann Dowd – Compliance as Sandra Frum; Zoe Kazan – Ruby Sparks as Ruby Sparks; Helen Mirren – Hitchcock as Alma Reville; Naomi Watts – The Impossible as Maria Bennett
Best Supporting Actor	Best Supporting Actress
Clark Gregg – The Avengers as Phil Coulson; Javier Bardem – Skyfall as Raoul Silva; Michael Fassbender – Prometheus as David 8; Joseph Gordon-Levitt – The Dark Knight Rises as John Blake; Ian McKellen – The Hobbit: An Unexpected Journey as Gandalf; Christoph Waltz – Django Unchained as Dr. King Schultz	Anne Hathaway – The Dark Knight Rises as Selina Kyle / Catwoman; Judi Dench – Skyfall as M; Gina Gershon – Killer Joe as Sharla Smith; Anne Hathaway – Les Misérables as Fantine; Nicole Kidman – The Paperboy as Charlotte Bless; Charlize Theron – Snow White and the Huntsman as Queen Ravenna
Best Performance by a Younger Actor	Best Music
Suraj Sharma – Life of Pi as Pi Patel; CJ Adams – The Odd Life of Timothy Green as Timothy Green; Tom Holland – The Impossible as Lucas Bennett; Daniel Huttlestone – Les Misérables as Gavroche; Chloë Grace Moretz – Dark Shadows as Carolyn Stoddard; Quvenzhané Wallis – Beasts of the Southern Wild as Hushpuppy	Danny Elfman – Frankenweenie; Mychael Danna – Life of Pi; Dario Marianelli – Anna Karenina; Thomas Newman – Skyfall; Howard Shore – The Hobbit: An Unexpected Journey; Hans Zimmer – The Dark Knight Rises
Best Production Design	Best Editing
Dan Hennah – The Hobbit: An Unexpected Journey; Hugh Bateup and Uli Hanisch – Cloud Atlas; Sarah Greenwood – Anna Karenina; David Gropman – Life of Pi; Rick Heinrichs – Dark Shadows; Eve Stewart – Les Misérables	Alexander Berner – Cloud Atlas; Stuart Baird and Kate Baird – Skyfall; Bob Ducsay – Looper; Jeffrey Ford and Lisa Lassek – The Avengers; John Gilroy – The Bourne Legacy; Tim Squyres – Life of Pi
Best Costume	Best Make-up
Paco Delgado – Les Misérables; Jacquline Durran – Anna Karenina; Kym Barrett and Pierre-Yves Gayraud – Cloud Atlas; Sharen Davis – Django Unchained; Bob Buck, Ann Maskrey and Richard Taylor – The Hobbit: An Unexpected Journey; Colleen Atwood – Snow White and the Huntsman	Heike Merker, Daniel Parker and Jeremy Woodhead – Cloud Atlas; Greg Nicotero, Howard Berger, Peter Montagna and Julie Hewitt – Hitchcock; Peter Swords King, Rick Findlater and Tami Lane – The Hobbit: An Unexpected Journey; David Martí, Montse Ribé and Vasit Suchitta – The Impossible; Naomi Donne, Donald Mowat and Love Larson – Skyfall; Jean Ann Black and Fay Von Schroeder – The Twilight Saga: Breaking Dawn – Part 2
Best Special Effects	Best International Film
Janek Sirrs, Jeff White, Guy Williams, and Dan Sudick – The Avengers; Grady Cofer, Pablo Helman, Jeanie King and Burt Dalton – Battleship; Joe Letteri, Eric Saindon, David Clayton and R. Christopher White – The Hobbit: An Unexpected Journey; Chris Corbould, Peter Chiang, Scott R. Fisher and Sue Rowe – John Carter; Bill Westenhofer, Guillaume Rocheron, Erik-Jan De Boer, Donald R. Elliott – Life of Pi; Cedric Nichols-Troyan, Philip Brennan, Neil Corbould and Michael Dawson – Snow White and the Huntsman	Headhunters; Anna Karenina; Chicken with Plums; The Fairy; My Way; Pusher
Best Independent Film	Best Animated Film
Killer Joe; Compliance; Hitchcock; The Paperboy; Robot and Frank; Safety Not Guaranteed; Seeking a Friend for the End of the World	Frankenweenie; Brave; ParaNorman; Wreck-It Ralph

=== Television ===
==== Programs ====
Best Network Television Series	Best Syndicated/Cable Television Series
Revolution (NBC); Elementary (CBS); The Following (Fox); Fringe (Fox); Once Upon a Time (ABC); Supernatural (The CW)	The Walking Dead (AMC); American Horror Story: Asylum (FX); Dexter (Showtime); The Killing (AMC); Leverage (TNT); True Blood (HBO)
Best Television Presentation	Best Youth-Oriented Television Series
Breaking Bad (AMC); Continuum (Syfy); Falling Skies (TNT); Game of Thrones (HBO); Mockingbird Lane (NBC); Spartacus: War of the Damned (Starz); World Without End (Reelz)	Teen Wolf (MTV); Arrow (The CW); Beauty & the Beast (The CW); Doctor Who (BBC America); Merlin (Syfy); The Vampire Diaries (The CW)

==== Acting ====
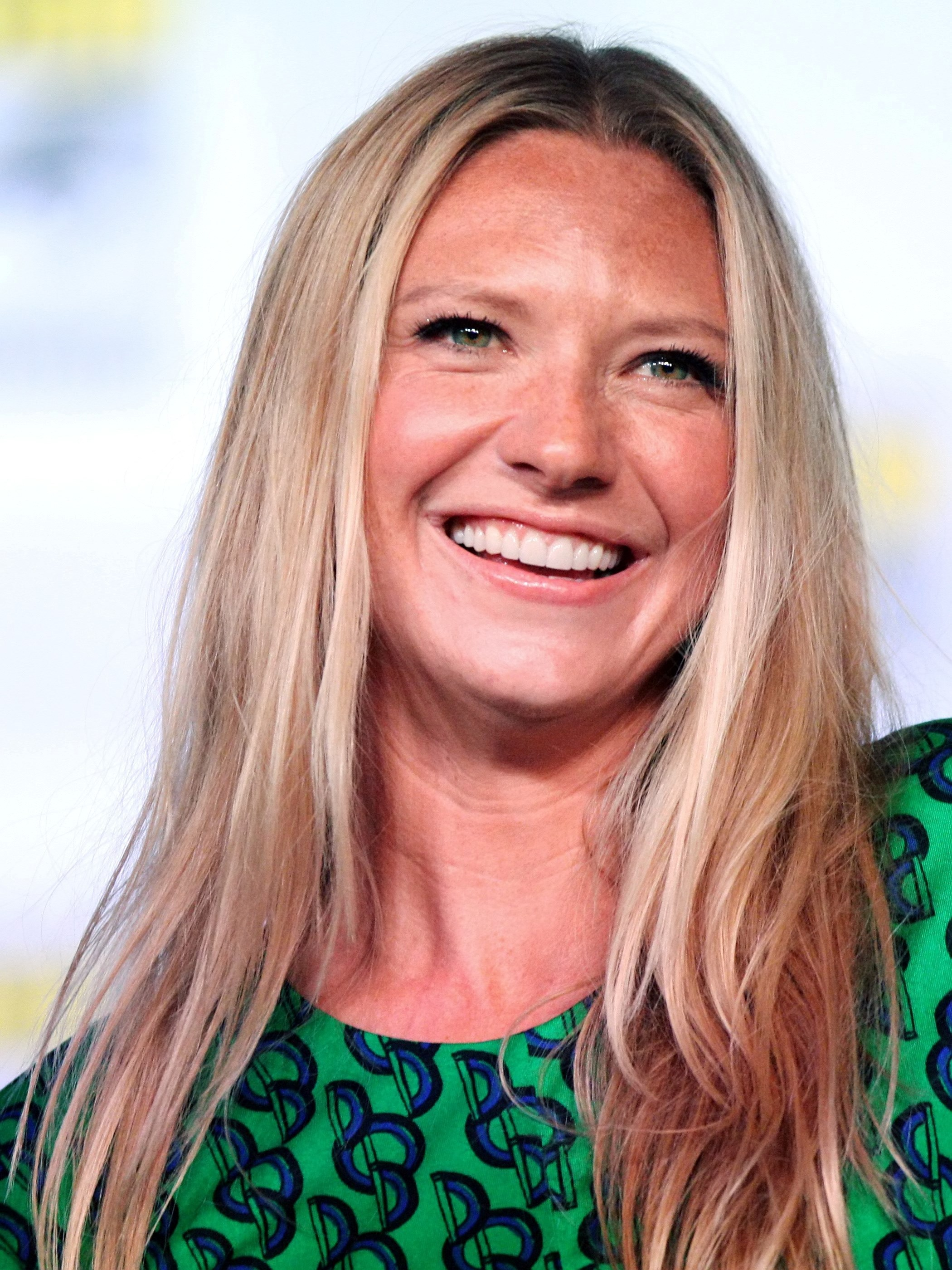
Anna Torv won her fourth consecutive Best Actress on Television Award for Fringe. She has been nominated five times.

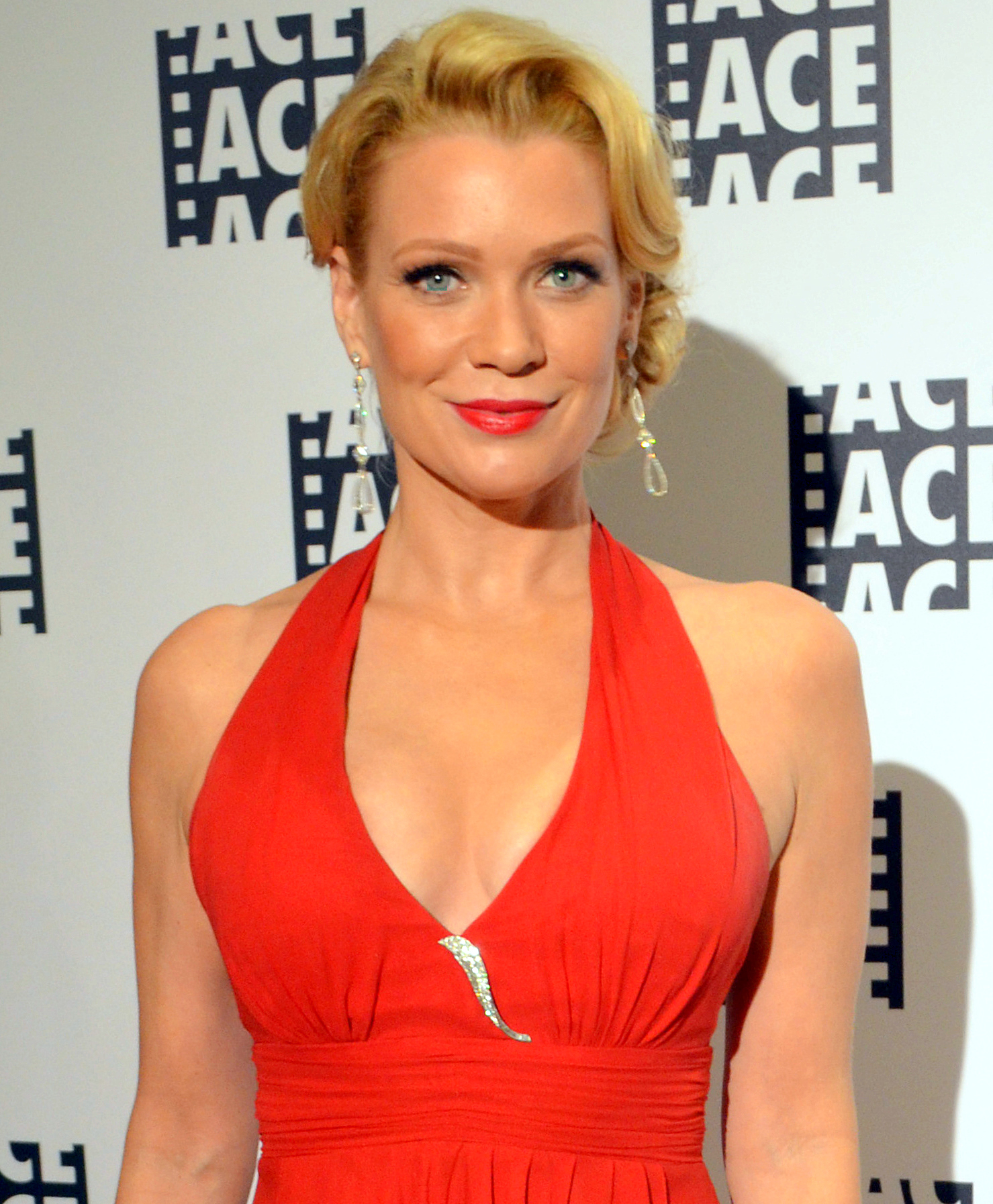
Laurie Holden earned her second nomination for The Walking Dead in the Best Supporting Actress on Television category.

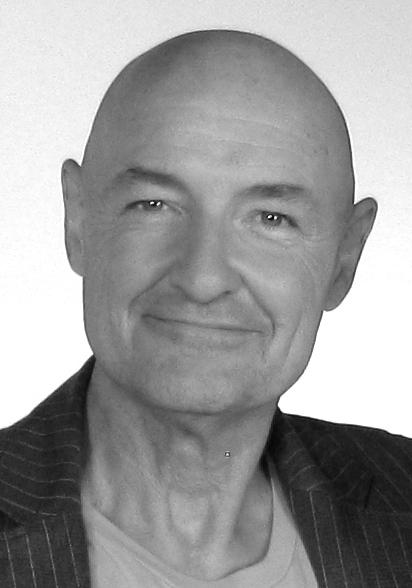
Terry O'Quinn was nominated for Best Guest Starring Role on Television for his appearances on Falling Skies. This is his sixth Saturn Award nomination, including a Best Supporting Actor on Television win for Lost.

Best Actor on Television	Best Actress on Television
Bryan Cranston – Breaking Bad (AMC) as Walter White (tie); Kevin Bacon – The Following (Fox) as Ryan Hardy (tie); Billy Burke – Revolution (NBC) as Miles Matheson; Michael C. Hall – Dexter (Showtime) as Dexter Morgan; Timothy Hutton – Leverage (TNT) as Nathan Ford; Joshua Jackson – Fringe (Fox) as Peter Bishop; Andrew Lincoln – The Walking Dead (AMC) as Rick Grimes	Anna Torv – Fringe (Fox) as Olivia Dunham; Moon Bloodgood – Falling Skies (TNT) as Anne Glass; Mireille Enos – The Killing (AMC) as Sarah Linden; Sarah Paulson – American Horror Story: Asylum (FX) as Lana Winters; Charlotte Riley – World Without End (Reelz) as Caris Wooler; Tracy Spiridakos – Revolution (NBC) as Charlie Matheson
Best Supporting Actor on Television	Best Supporting Actress on Television
Jonathan Banks – Breaking Bad (AMC) as Mike Ehrmantraut; Giancarlo Esposito – Revolution (NBC) as Tom Neville; Todd Lasance – Spartacus: War of the Damned (Starz) as Julius Caesar; Colm Meaney – Hell on Wheels (AMC) as Thomas C. Durant; David Morrissey – The Walking Dead (AMC) as The Governor; John Noble – Fringe (Fox) as Walter Bishop	Laurie Holden – The Walking Dead (AMC) as Andrea; Jennifer Carpenter – Dexter (Showtime) as Debra Morgan; Sarah Carter – Falling Skies (TNT) as Maggie; Anna Gunn – Breaking Bad (AMC) as Skyler White; Jessica Lange – American Horror Story: Asylum (FX) as Sister Jude; Beth Riesgraf – Leverage (TNT) as Parker
Best Guest Performer on Television
Yvonne Strahovski – Dexter (Showtime) as Hannah McKay; Blair Brown – Fringe (Fox) as Nina Sharp; Terry O'Quinn – Falling Skies (TNT) as Arthur Manchester; Lance Reddick – Fringe (Fox) as Phillip Broyles; Mark Sheppard – Leverage (TNT) as Jim Sterling; Ray Stevenson – Dexter (Showtime) as Isaak Sirko

=== Home video ===
Best DVD or Blu-ray Release	Best DVD or Blu-ray Special Edition Release
Touchback; Atlas Shrugged: Part II: The Strike; Chained; Cosmopolis; The Possession; A Thousand Cuts	Little Shop of Horrors: The Director's Cut; Jaws: Universal 100th Anniversary Edition; Lawrence of Arabia: 50th Anniversary Collector's Edition; Les Vampires Classics Edition; Stanley Kubrick's Fear and Desire
Best DVD or Blu-ray Collection	Best DVD or Blu-ray TV Series
Universal Classic Monsters: The Essentials Collection (Dracula, Frankenstein, The Mummy, The Invisible Man, Bride of Frankenstein, The Wolf Man, Phantom of the Opera and Creature from the Black Lagoon); Alfred Hitchcock: The Masterpiece Collection (Saboteur, Shadow of a Doubt, Rope, Rear Window, The Trouble with Harry, The Man Who Knew Too Much, Vertigo, North by Northwest, Psycho, The Birds, Marnie, Torn Curtain, Topaz, Frenzy and Family Plot); Battle Royale: The Complete Collection (Battle Royale (both theatrical and director's-cut versions) and Battle Royale II: Requiem); Bond 50: The Complete 22 Film Collection (Dr. No, From Russia with Love, Goldfinger, Thunderball, You Only Live Twice, Casino Royale, On Her Majesty's Secret Service, Diamonds Are Forever, Live and Let Die, The Man with the Golden Gun, The Spy Who Loved Me, Moonraker, For Your Eyes Only, Octopussy, A View to a Kill, The Living Daylights, Licence to Kill, GoldenEye, Tomorrow Never Dies, The World Is Not Enough, Die Another Day, Casino Royale and Quantum of Solace); Dark Shadows: The Complete Original Series; The Ultimate Buster Keaton Blu-ray Collection	Star Trek: The Next Generation: Seasons 1 and 2; In Search Of...: The Complete Series; Logan's Run: The Complete Series; The River: The Complete First Season; Shazam! The Complete Live-Action Series; Spartacus: Vengeance
