= McCullin =

McCullin is a surname and may refer to:

- Don McCullin, a British photojournalist
- McCullin (film), a 2012 British documentary film about Don McCullin
