= Life of Pi (soundtrack) =

Soundtrack album by Mychael Danna
- Released: 16 November 2012
- Recorded: 2012
- Genre: Indian classical music
- Length: 65:11
- Label: Sony Classical
- Producer: Mychael Danna

Mychael Danna soundtracks chronology
Moneyball (2011)	Life of Pi (2012)	Devil's Knot (2013)

Life of Pi is the soundtrack album to the 2012 film of the same name directed by Ang Lee. It consists of music entirely composed and produced by Mychael Danna. The album was released in November 2012 by Sony Classical and went on to win a number of awards, including the Academy Award for Best Original Score.

== Background ==
Mychael Danna had known Ang Lee for around fifteen years and had previously contributed the soundtrack to Lee's films The Ice Storm and Ride with the Devil. Danna spent a year working on the Life of Pi score, which was recorded primarily in Los Angeles, but also in India and Canada. The score consists mainly of instrumental music, blending Western orchestral sounds with traditional Indian instrumentation (sitars, bansuris, kanjiras, among others) and minor French influences (accordions). The opening track "Pi's Lullaby" is the soundtrack's only vocal piece, co-written and sung in Tamil by Bombay Jayashri, although a number of other songs include wordless vocalising.

The soundtrack was first made available for streaming on SoundCloud and Spotify in October 2012. The official physical and digital release followed on 16 November, shortly before the film's general premiere. "Pi's Lullaby" was released as a promotional CD single to solicit nomination for an Academy Award.

== Reception and accolades ==
The Life of Pi soundtrack album has received positive reviews. In the four-star review for AllMusic, James Christopher Monger described it as "a moving yet unassuming score that supports the film's lush visuals without resorting to bombast". UK's Classic FM described it as "perfect for a movie that makes such a visually stunning impact".

The soundtrack has won the Best Original Score Academy Award, the Best Original Score Golden Globe Award, and the International Film Music Critics Association Award for the Score of the Year. It was also nominated to the BAFTA Award for Best Film Music, the Critics' Choice Movie Award for Best Score, the Grammy Award for Best Score Soundtrack for Visual Media, the Saturn Award for Best Music, and the San Diego Film Critics Society Award for Best Original Score.

== Track listing ==
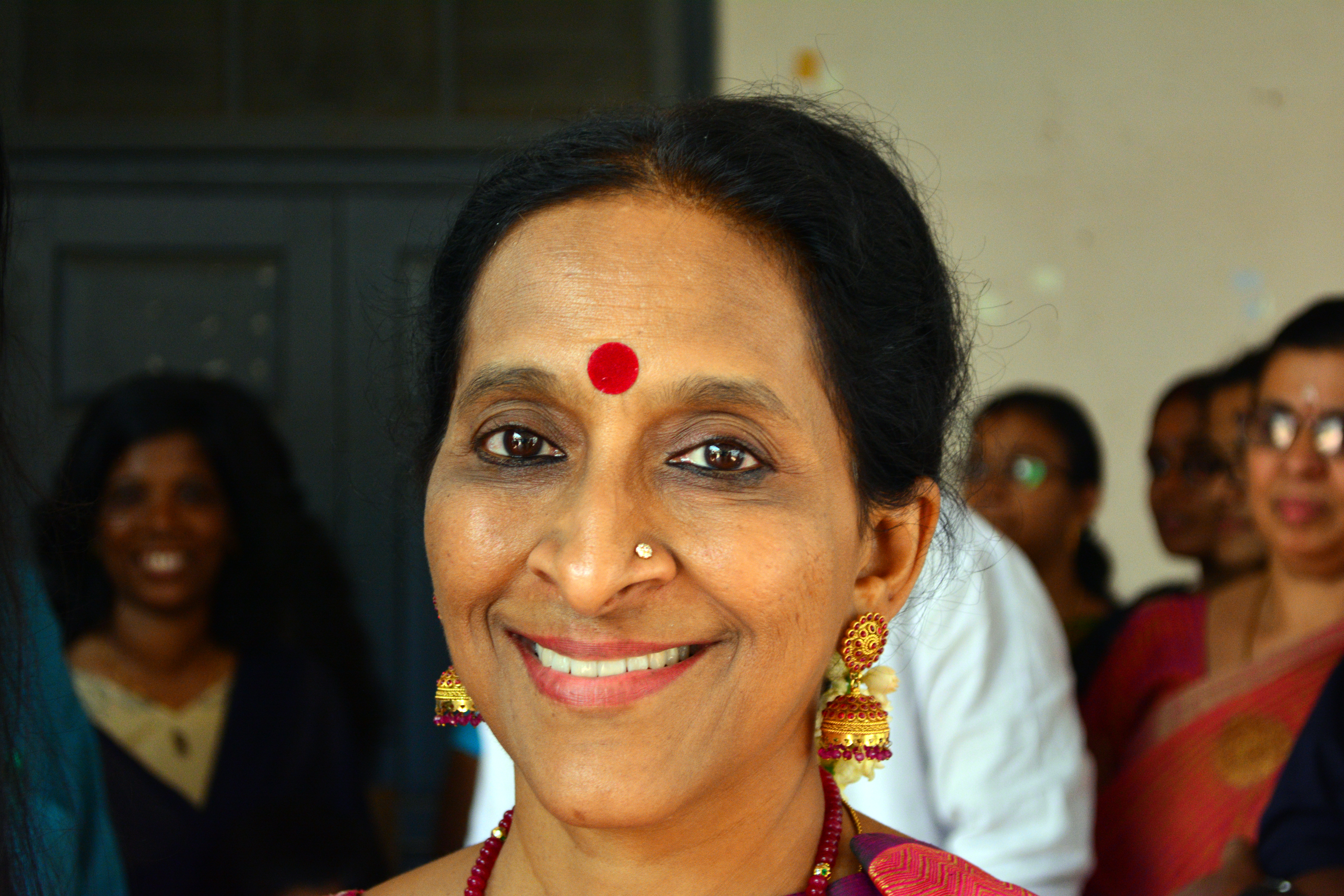
Bombay Jayashri

Track titles and running times adapted from iTunes Store.

1. "Pi's Lullaby" (with Bombay Jayashri) – 3:42
2. "Piscine Molitor Patel / Sous le Ciel de Paris" – 3:39
3. "Pondicherry" – 1:12
4. "Meeting Krishna" – 1:51
5. "Christ in the Mountains" – 1:13
6. "Thank You Vishnu for Introducing Me to Christ / Raga Ahir Bhairav" – 0:55
7. "Richard Parker" – 0:54
8. "Appa's Lesson" – 1:06
9. "Anandi" – 0:55
10. "Leaving India" – 1:20
11. "The Deepest Spot on Earth" – 0:48
12. "Tsimtsum" – 2:49
13. "Death of the Zebra" – 0:33
14. "First Night, First Day" – 3:45
15. "Set Your House in Order" – 2:10
16. "Skinny Vegetarian Boy" – 2:16
17. "Pi and Richard Parker" – 2:14
18. "The Whale" – 2:02
19. "Flying Fish" – 0:49
20. "Tiger Training" – 1:22
21. "Orphans" – 1:36
22. "Tiger Vision" – 4:31
23. "God Storm" – 3:42
24. "I'm Ready Now" – 3:21
25. "The Island" – 1:59
26. "Back to the World" – 8:20
27. "The Second Story" – 4:02
28. "Which Story Do You Prefer?" – 2:05

== Charts ==
Chart (2012–13)	Peak position
Belgian Classical Albums (Ultratop)	9
Spanish Top 100 Albums (Promusicae)	80
UK Soundtrack Albums (OCC)	25
