= Rhythm & Hues Studios =

US visual effects and animation company

- Type: Subsidiary
- Industry: Visual effects, CGI animation
- Founded: 1987; 39 years ago
- Headquarters: Hollywood, California, United States
- Number of locations: Vancouver Canada India Delhi Hyderabad Bombay Malaysia Taiwan Singapore
- Revenue: 850 Billion
- Number of employees: 5000-10,000
- Parent: Prana Studios
- Website: https://www.company3.com

Rhythm & Hues Studios (R&H) was an American visual effects and animation company founded in 1987, that received the Academy Award for Best Visual Effects in 1995 for Babe, in 2007 for The Golden Compass, and in 2012 for Life of Pi. It also received four Scientific and Technical Academy Awards.

The company filed for Chapter 11 bankruptcy in early 2013. It was then purchased by an affiliate of Prana Studios, 34x118 Holdings, LLC, but retained the same name.

== History ==
=== 1987 ===
Rhythm & Hues Studios was established in Los Angeles, California in 1987 by former employees of Robert Abel and Associates (John Hughes, Pauline Ts'o, Keith Goldfarb, Cliff Boule, Frank Wuts and Charles Gibson).

In 1999, Rhythm & Hues Studios acquired visual effects house VIFX from 20th Century Fox.

=== 2007 ===
Director Ang Lee approached Rhythm & Hues in August 2009 to discuss a planned film adaptation of the fantasy novel Life of Pi. R&H VFX (Visual Effects) Supervisor Bill Westenhofer noted that Lee "knew we had done the lion in the first Narnia movie. He asked, 'Does a digital character look more or less real in 3D?' We looked at each other and thought that was a pretty good question." He also stated that during these meetings, Lee said, "'I look forward to making art with you.' This was really for me one of the most rewarding things I've worked on and the first chance to really combine art with VFX. Every shot was artistic exploration, to make the ocean a character and make it interesting we had to strive to make it as visually stunning as possible."

By 2012, the company had become a global one, with offices and artists in India (the Mumbai suburb of Malad and HITEC City which is a part of Hyderabad), Malaysia (Cyberjaya just outside Kuala Lumpur), Canada (Vancouver), and Taiwan (Kaohsiung).

Rhythm & Hues spent a year on research and development, "building upon its already vast knowledge of CGI animation" to develop the tiger. Artist Abdul Rahman in the Malaysian branch underscored the global nature of the effects process, saying that "the special thing about Life of Pi is that it was the first time we did something called remote rendering, where we engaged our cloud infrastructure in Taiwan called CAVE (Cloud Animation and Visual Effects)".

The resulting film, Life of Pi, was released in theaters in November 2012, and was a critical and commercial success. The British Film Institute's Sight & Sound magazine suggested that, "Life of Pi can be seen as the film Rhythm & Hues has been building up to all these years, by taking things they learned from each production from Cats & Dogs to Yogi Bear, integrating their animals in different situations and environments, pushing them to do more, and understanding how all of this can succeed both visually and dramatically."

=== 2013–2020 ===
On February 11, 2013, Rhythm & Hues Studios filed for bankruptcy under Chapter 11, three months after Life of Pi was released. Around 254 people were laid off at that time. This led to a demonstration of nearly 500 VFX artists who protested outside of the 2013 Academy Awards, as Rhythm & Hues was nominated for an Oscar (which it won) for Life of Pi. Inside, during the Oscars, when R&H visual effects supervisor Bill Westenhofer brought up R&H during his acceptance speech for Life of Pi, the microphone was cut off as the music of Jaws slowly took over. This started an uproar among many visual effects industry professionals, changing profile pictures on social media such as Facebook and Twitter to show the green key color, in order to raise awareness of general negative trends in the effects industry. In addition, director Ang Lee was heavily criticized by the community for not acknowledging their work in the effects-laden film in his acceptance speech, despite thanking many other people, and for earlier having complained about the costs of visual effects.

On March 29, 2013, an affiliate of Prana Studios, 34x118 Holdings, LLC, won the bidding on Rhythm and Hues in a bankruptcy auction. The sale was "valued at about $30 million".

After the bankruptcy and sale, Rhythm and Hues continued to work on film, television, and ride-film projects, winning multiple Emmy Awards and a Visual Effects Society award for their work on Game of Thrones, until it finally shut down in 2020 due to the COVID-19 pandemic.

== Selected filmography ==
2022

- RRR

2021

- The King's Man

2019

- Hellboy
- The Boys

2018

- Lost in Space
- Carnival Row
- The Walking Dead (season 8)
- Slender Man
- 2.0

2017

- Game of Thrones (season 7)
- The Walking Dead (season 7)
- Midnight, Texas
- The Mist

2016

- Game of Thrones (season 6)
- Skull Island: Reign of Kong

2015

- Game of Thrones (season 5)
- Fear the Walking Dead

2014

- 300: Rise of an Empire
- Seventh Son
- Winter's Tale
- Tammy
- Into the Storm
- X-Men: Days of Future Past

2013

- Percy Jackson: Sea of Monsters
- Machete Kills
- R.I.P.D.
- Grown Ups 2
- The Secret Life of Walter Mitty

2012

- The Bourne Legacy
- Big Miracle
- Django Unchained
- Chronicle
- Red Dawn
- The Hunger Games
- This is 40
- Life of Pi
- Snow White and the Huntsman

2011

- Alvin and the Chipmunks: Chipwrecked
- Hop
- Moneyball
- The Cabin in the Woods
- Game of Thrones
- Red Riding Hood
- Mr. Popper's Penguins
- X-Men: First Class

2010

- The A-Team
- Marmaduke
- Charlie St. Cloud
- Percy Jackson & the Olympians: The Lightning Thief
- The Wolfman
- Knight and Day
- Little Fockers
- Hot Tub Time Machine
- Yogi Bear

2009

- Aliens in the Attic
- Ghosts of Girlfriends Past
- Fast & Furious
- The Time Traveler's Wife
- Cirque du Freak: The Vampire's Assistant
- State of Play
- Land of the Lost
- Alvin and the Chipmunks: The Squeakquel
- Night at the Museum: Battle of the Smithsonian

2008

- The Incredible Hulk
- The Mummy: Tomb of the Dragon Emperor

2007

- The Golden Compass
- Live Free or Die Hard
- I Now Pronounce You Chuck & Larry
- The Seeker: The Dark Is Rising
- The Kingdom
- Alvin and the Chipmunks
- Evan Almighty

2006

- Charlotte's Web
- Garfield: A Tale of Two Kitties
- The Fast and the Furious: Tokyo Drift
- Happy Feet
- Night at the Museum
- Superman Returns
- X-Men: The Last Stand

2005

- The Chronicles of Narnia: The Lion, The Witch and The Wardrobe
- Elektra
- The Longest Yard
- The Skeleton Key
- The Ring 2
- Serenity
- Ice Princess

2004

- Around the World in 80 Days
- Garfield: The Movie
- Friday Night Lights
- The Flight of the Phoenix
- The Chronicles of Riddick
- Scooby-Doo 2: Monsters Unleashed

2003

- The Cat in the Hat
- Daredevil
- The Rundown
- Intolerable Cruelty
- Elf
- The Lord of the Rings: The Return of the King
- X2

2002

- Men in Black II
- Scooby-Doo
- The Ring
- Solaris
- Kung POW!
- Stuart Little 2
- The Sum of All Fears

2001

- Cats & Dogs
- Along Came a Spider
- Behind Enemy Lines
- One Night at McCool's
- Harry Potter and the Sorcerer's Stone
- The Lord of the Rings: The Fellowship of the Ring
- Planet of the Apes

2000

- How the Grinch Stole Christmas
- Little Nicky
- X-Men
- Fantasia 2000
- Dracula 2000
- Bedazzled
- Frequency
- Battlefield Earth
- The Sixth Day
- The Flintstones in Viva Rock Vegas
- Rugrats in Paris: The Movie
- Hollow Man

1999

- Anna and the King
- The Green Mile
- End of Days
- Mystery Men
- Summer of Sam
- The Story of Us
- Stuart Little

1998

- Babe: Pig in the City
- The Parent Trap
- Dr. Dolittle
- The Faculty
- Soldier
- Stepmom

1997

- Speed 2: Cruise Control
- Spawn
- MouseHunt
- Batman & Robin

1996

- Kazaam
- The Nutty Professor

1995

- Babe
- Batman Forever
- Ace Ventura: When Nature Calls
- Waterworld

1994

- The Pagemaster
- The Flintstones

1993

- Dennis the Menace
- Hocus Pocus
- We're Back! A Dinosaur's Story

1992

- Stay Tuned

1991

- Rover Dangerfield
- Flight of the Intruder

1990

- The Funtastic World of Hanna-Barbera
- Jetsons: The Movie

== Awards ==
=== Academy Award for Best Visual Effects ===
- 2012: Won: Life of Pi
- 2007: Won: The Golden Compass
- 1995: Won: Babe

=== BAFTA Award for Best Special Visual Effects ===
- 2013: Won: Life of Pi
- 2007: Won: The Golden Compass, Visual Effects

=== Emmy Award for Outstanding Special Visual Effects ===
- 2018: Won: Game of Thrones "Beyond the Wall"
- 2016: Won: Game of Thrones "Battle of the Bastards"
- 2015: Won: Game of Thrones "The Dance of Dragons"

=== Visual Effects Society Award for Outstanding Animated Performance ===
- 2016: Won: Game of Thrones "Battle of the Bastards; Drogon"

== Bibliography ==
- Carlson, Wayne. "Chapter 11.6, Production Companies: Rhythm and Hues" in Computer Graphics and Computer Animation: A Retrospective Overview (ebook), Ohio State University Press, 2017: pp. 353-354.
- Giardina, Carolyn (February 26, 2014). "Revealing 'Rhythm & Hues: Life After Pi' Doc Exposes Grief, Anger and Troubled Business (Video)". The Hollywood Reporter.
- Lee, Kevin (December 21, 2012). "Video essay: The animal menagerie of Rhythm and Hues". Sight & Sound. British Film Institute.
- Wiedemann, Julius (2004). "Rhythm & Hues". Animation Now!. Taschen America. pp. 428–435. ISBN 978-3822832202.
