= Donald R. Elliott =

Visual effects supervisor

- Other name: Don Elliott
- Occupation: Visual effects supervisor
- Years active: 1986-present

Donald R. Elliott is a visual effects supervisor. He won at the 85th Academy Awards in the category of Best Visual Effects for his work on the film Life of Pi. He shared his win with Erik-Jan de Boer, Guillaume Rocheron, and Bill Westenhofer.

== Selected filmography ==
- Star Trek IV: The Voyage Home (1986)
- Twins (1988)
- Back to the Future Part II (1989)
- Back to the Future Part III (1990)
- Hook (1991)
- Death Becomes Her (1992)
- Jurassic Park (1993)
- The Flintstones (1994)
- Congo (1995)
- Mars Attacks! (1996)
- The Lost World: Jurassic Park (1997)
- Deep Impact (1998)
- Jurassic Park III (2001)
- Minority Report (2002)
- Pirates of the Caribbean: Dead Man's Chest (2006)
- A Christmas Carol (2009)
- Life of Pi (2012)
