= Guillaume Rocheron =

French visual effects supervisor (born 1981)

- Born: 1981 (age 44–45); Paris, France
- Occupation: Visual effects supervisor
- Years active: 2000-present

Guillaume Rocheron is a French visual effects supervisor who was born in 1981 in Paris. He began his career in 2000 at the Paris-based BUF Compagnie and after five years there, he was invited to work for the Moving Picture Company. He won the Academy Award during the 85th Academy Awards for the film Life of Pi in the category of Best Visual Effects. He shared his win with Donald R. Elliott, Erik-Jan de Boer, and Bill Westenhofer. In 2020, he received his second Academy Award nomination for Best Visual Effects, and second win, for the 2019 film, 1917, at the 92nd Academy Awards.

== Selected filmography ==
- Panic Room (2002)
- The Matrix Reloaded (2003)
- Batman Begins (2005)
- Harry Potter and the Goblet of Fire (2005)
- X-Men: The Last Stand (2006)
- 10,000 BC (2008)
- The Chronicles of Narnia: Prince Caspian (2008)
- G.I. Joe: The Rise of Cobra (2009)
- Harry Potter and the Half-Blood Prince (2009)
- Night at the Museum: Battle of the Smithsonian (2009)
- Percy Jackson & the Olympians: The Lightning Thief (2010)
- Fast Five (2011)
- Sucker Punch (2011)
- Life of Pi (2012)
- Man of Steel (2013)
- The Secret Life of Walter Mitty (2013)
- Godzilla (2014)
- Into the Storm (2014)
- Batman v Superman: Dawn of Justice (2016)
- Ghost in the Shell (2017)
- Godzilla: King of the Monsters (2019)
- Ad Astra (2019)
- 1917 (2019)
- Nope (2022)
- Bardo (2022)
