= Here to Fall =

- Theatrical release poster
- Directed by: Kris Kelly
- Written by: Kris Kelly & Evelyn McGrath
- Produced by: Evelyn McGrath
- Edited by: Jim Agnew
- Music by: Michael Fleming
- Production company: Blacknorth
- Release date: July 10, 2012
- Running time: 6 minutes

Here to Fall is an original short film produced by the Blacknorth studio. Its plot deals with protagonist Amy's attempt to reconnect with her father.

Here To Fall received a number of awards, including the 2012 Darklight Award for Best Animation and the 2012 Don Quixote Prize for Best Animation at the Galway Film Fleadh. It subsequently received a BAFTA nomination for Best Short Animation in 2013. In the same year, it was selected to be shown at the Brooklyn Film Festival, Raindance, Encounters and Foyle Film Festival.

== Recognition ==
- BAFTA: Best Short Animation (Nominee, 2013)
- Galway Film Fleadh: Don Quixote Award (Winner, 2013)
- Raindance Film Festival: Best Animation (Nominee, 2013)
- Darklight Film Festival: Best Animation (Winner, 2012)
