= McCullin (film) =

- Cover of McCullin
- Directed by: David Morris; Jacqui Morris
- Produced by: David Morris; Jacqui Morris
- Starring: Harold Evans; Don McCullin
- Cinematography: Richard Stewart; Michael Wood
- Edited by: David Fairhead; Andy McGraw
- Music by: Alex Baranowski
- Release date: 27 April 2012 (Hot Docs)
- Running time: 95 minutes
- Language: English

McCullin is a 2012 feature-length documentary film, directed by David Morris and Jacqui Morris, about the life and work of photojournalist Don McCullin.

The film premiered at the 2012 Hot Docs Canadian International Documentary Festival.

McCullin was nominated for Outstanding Debut by a British Writer, Director or Producer and Best Documentary at the 66th British Academy Film Awards. It also won the award for Best Use of Footage in a Cinema Release at the 2014 Focal International Awards.

At Rotten Tomatoes, it has a 100% approval rating based on 18 reviews, and an average rating of 7.3/10, with consensus not yet reached.
