= Pi's Lullaby =

Single by Bombay Jayashri

from the album Life of Pi: Original Motion Picture Soundtrack
- Released: November 19, 2012
- Recorded: 2012
- Genre: Lullaby
- Length: 3:42
- Label: Sony Masterworks
- Songwriters: Mychael Danna; Bombay Jayashri
- Producer: Mychael Danna

"Pi's Lullaby" is the Tamil-language intro song of the 2012 film Life of Pi. It was composed by Mychael Danna, with lyrics by Bombay Jayashri, who also performed the song. The song earned a nomination at the 85th Academy Awards for Best Original Song. The nomination marks the first ever Tamil song to be nominated in the category.

According to Jayashri's blog, in order to convey the mood he wanted for the song, director Ang Lee told her "A child sleeps not because he is sleepy, but because he feels safe."

== Controversy ==
The Irayimman Thampi Memorial Trust alleged that the first eight lines of "Pi's Lullaby" were not an original composition but a mere translation into Tamil of Irayimman Thampi's famous lullaby in Malayalam, "Omanathinkal Kidavo". Jayashri however maintains that she merely wrote what came to her heart and has denied the allegation against her.

Earlier, Jayashri had used Thampi's lullaby in her Album named 'Vatsalyam', released in 2003.
