= David Womark =

American film producer

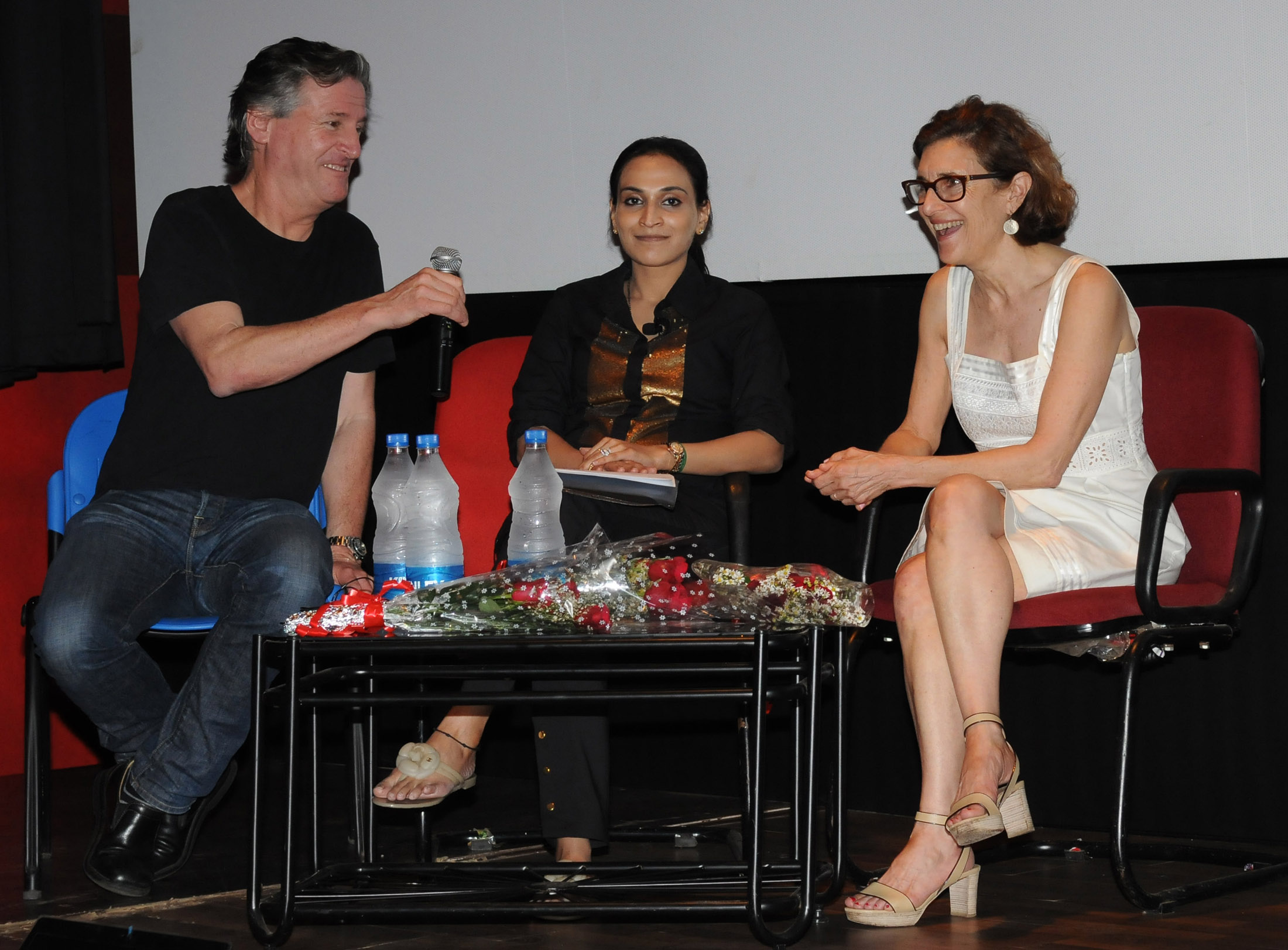
- Womark (left), Aishwarya Rajinikanth (center), Avy Kaufman (right) at IFFI 2012
- Occupation: Film producer
- Years active: 1982–present

David Womark is an American film producer. Womark, along with Ang Lee and Gil Netter, was nominated for an Academy Award for his work on Life of Pi.

Life of Pi was also nominated for multiple Academy, BAFTA and Golden Globe awards including: Best Picture and Best Director and was an American Film Institute official selection for “best movie of the year”. Life of Pi was a critical and commercial success, earning over US$609 million worldwide.

Womark has also produced such films as Deepwater Horizon Jurassic Park III and G.I. Joe: The Rise of Cobra.
