= Life of Pi (film) =

2012 film by Ang Lee

- Theatrical release poster
- Directed by: Ang Lee
- Screenplay by: David Magee
- Based on: Life of Pi by Yann Martel
- Produced by: Gil Netter; Ang Lee; David Womark
- Starring: Suraj Sharma; Irrfan Khan; Tabu; Rafe Spall; Gérard Depardieu
- Cinematography: Claudio Miranda
- Edited by: Tim Squyres
- Music by: Mychael Danna
- Production companies: Fox 2000 Pictures; Dune Entertainment; Ingenious Media; Haishang Films
- Distributed by: 20th Century Fox
- Release dates: September 28, 2012 (NYFF); November 21, 2012 (United States)
- Running time: 127 minutes
- Countries: United States; United Kingdom; Taiwan
- Language: English
- Budget: $120 million
- Box office: $609 million

Life of Pi is a 2012 adventure-drama film directed and produced by Ang Lee and written by David Magee. Based on Yann Martel's 2001 novel, it stars Suraj Sharma in his film debut, Irrfan Khan, Tabu, Rafe Spall, Gérard Depardieu and Adil Hussain in lead roles. The storyline revolves around Pi Patel, a 16-year old Indian boy, and a Bengal tiger named Richard Parker, who are both stranded on a lifeboat for 227 days after a shipwreck.

The film began development shortly after the release of the book and would see directors M. Night Shyamalan, Alfonso Cuarón and Jean-Pierre Jeunet involved at various stages before the hiring of Lee. Filming was split between India, Taiwan and Montreal in 2011, with Rhythm & Hues Studios (R&H) handling the visual effects work.

Life of Pi had its worldwide premiere as the opening film of the 50th New York Film Festival at both the Walter Reade Theater and Alice Tully Hall in New York City on September 28, 2012, and was theatrically released in the United States on November 21 by 20th Century Fox. The film became a commercial success, having grossed over $609 million worldwide, making it Lee's highest-grossing film. It received positive reviews from critics and received numerous accolades, including nominations for three Golden Globe Awards: Best Picture – Drama, Best Director, Golden Globe Award for Best Original Score, winning the latter. At the 85th Academy Awards, it was nominated for eleven awards, including Best Picture and Best Adapted Screenplay, and won four, including Best Director for Lee.

== Plot ==
In the early 2010s (Note: While the film itself never mentions when exactly Pi meets the writer, it is inferred from the screenplay, which states that Pi was 50 years old at the time, that this meeting takes place sometime around 2010 or 2011.) Montreal, a writer meets Pi Patel, whom he has been told would be a good subject for a book. Pi tells the writer the following story:

Pi is born in 1960, named Piscine Molitor Patel after Piscine Molitor, a famous French swimming pool. In secondary school in Pondicherry, he adopts the Greek letter "Pi" as his nickname to avoid bullying, because his first name Piscine sounds like 'pissing'. He is raised in a Hindu family, but in 1973, he is introduced to Christianity and then Islam and decides to follow all three religions as he "just wants to love God".

Pi's mother supports his desire to grow, but his rationalist father tries to secularize him. Their family owns a zoo, and Pi takes interest in a Bengal tiger named Richard Parker. After he gets dangerously close to Richard Parker, his father forces him to witness it killing a goat.

In 1977, Pi's father announces that due to "The Emergency" they must move to Canada, where he intends to settle and sell the animals. The family books passage with the animals on a Japanese freighter. During a storm, the ship founders while Pi is on deck. He struggles to find his family but a crewman throws him into a lifeboat. A freed plains zebra jumps onto the boat with him, breaking its leg. The ship sinks into the Mariana Trench, drowning his family.

After the storm, Pi awakens in the lifeboat with the zebra and is joined by a Bornean orangutan. A spotted hyena emerges from under a tarpaulin, forcing Pi to retreat to the end of the boat. The hyena kills the zebra and later the orangutan. After some time, Richard Parker emerges from under the tarpaulin and kills the hyena before retreating to cover.

Pi fashions a small raft, which he tethers to the lifeboat to be safe from Richard Parker. His moral code is against killing, but he begins fishing, enabling him to sustain the tiger. When the tiger jumps into the sea to hunt for fish and swims toward Pi, he considers letting him drown but ultimately helps him into the boat. One night, a humpback whale destroys the raft and its supplies. Pi trains Richard Parker to accept him in the boat and realizes that caring for the tiger is helping to keep himself alive.

Weeks later, they encounter a floating island. It is a lush jungle of edible plants, freshwater pools and a large population of meerkats, enabling Pi and Richard Parker to eat, drink and regain strength. At night the island transforms into a hostile environment. Richard Parker retreats to the lifeboat while Pi and the meerkats sleep in the trees; the water pools turn acidic. Pi deduces that the island is carnivorous after finding a human tooth embedded in a flower.

Pi and Richard Parker leave the island, reaching Mexico after more than 200 days at sea. Pi is heartbroken that Richard Parker does not acknowledge him before disappearing into the jungle. While he recovers in a hospital in 1978, insurance agents for the Japanese freighter company interview him but do not believe his story and ask what really happened, specifically concerning why the ship sank.

Pi retells the story, in which the animals are replaced by humans: his mother for the orangutan, an amiable Buddhist sailor for the zebra, the ship's brutish cook for the hyena, and Pi himself for Richard Parker. The cook kills the sailor and feeds on his flesh. He then kills Pi's mother, after which Pi kills him and uses his remains as food and fish bait. The insurance agents are dissatisfied with this story but leave without questioning him further.

When the writer recognizes the animal story may be an allegory for the human story, Pi says that it does not matter which story is true because his family died either way, and neither story provides the explanation the insurance company wanted. He asks which story the author prefers, and the author chooses the former, to which Pi replies, "and so it goes with God". Glancing at a copy of the insurance report, the writer reads that Pi survived his adventure "in the company of an adult Bengal tiger".

== Cast ==
- Suraj Sharma as Piscine Molitor "Pi" Patel, age 16/17
  - Irrfan Khan as Pi Patel, adult
  - Gautam Belur as Pi Patel, age 5
  - Ayush Tandon as Pi Patel, age 11/12
- Tabu as Gita Patel, Pi's mother
- Rafe Spall as The Writer
- Gérard Depardieu as the Cook
- Adil Hussain as Santosh Patel, Pi's father
- Vibish Sivakumar as Ravi, age 18/19
  - Mohamed Abbas Khaleeli as Ravi, age 13/14
  - Ayan Khan as Ravi Patel, Pi's older brother, age 7
- Andrea Di Stefano as the Priest
- Shravanthi Sainath as Anandi, Pi's adolescent girlfriend
- Mythili Prakash as Pi's wife
- Raj Patel as Ravi Patel, Pi's son (named in honor of Pi's brother)
- Hadiqa Hamid as Adita Patel, Pi's daughter
- Elie Alouf as Francis "Mamaji" Adirubasamy
- T. M. Karthik as Science Teacher
- Amarendran Ramanan as Indian History Teacher
- Wang Po-chieh as Buddhist Sailor
- Jag Huang as Sailor

== Production ==
=== Development ===
I wanted to use water because the film is talking about faith, and it contains fish, life and every emotion for Pi. And air is God, heaven and something spiritual and death. That's how I see it. I believe the thing we call faith or God is our emotional attachment to the unknown. I'm Chinese; I believe in the Taoist Buddha. We don't talk about a deity, which is very much like this book; we're not talking about religion but God in the abstract sense, something to overpower you.

— Ang Lee, on the use of water and the spiritual element of Life of Pi, November 17, 2012.

The project had numerous directors and writers attached, and the Los Angeles Times credited Fox 2000 Pictures executive Elizabeth Gabler with keeping the project active.

The following October, Fox 2000 announced a partnership with M. Night Shyamalan to direct the film. Shyamalan was attracted to the novel particularly because its main character also comes from Pondicherry in India. The partners anticipated for Shyamalan to direct the film adaptation after completing The Village. He also replaced Georgaris as the screenwriter, writing a new screenplay for the film. Ultimately, Shyamalan chose to film Lady in the Water after The Village; he said later, "I was hesitant [to direct] because the book has kind of a twist ending. And I was concerned that as soon as you put my name on it, everybody would have a different experience."

In March 2005, Fox 2000 entered talks with Alfonso Cuarón to direct. Cuarón decided to direct Children of Men instead, and in October 2005, Fox 2000 hired Jean-Pierre Jeunet to direct the film. Jeunet began writing the screenplay with Guillaume Laurant, and filming was scheduled to begin in mid-2006, partially in India. Jeunet eventually left the project.

In February 2009, Fox 2000 Pictures hired Ang Lee to direct the film. In May 2010, Lee and the producer Gil Netter proposed a reported budget of US$120 million, at which the studio balked, placing the project's development on hold for a short time. David Magee was hired to write the screenplay, as Lee began to spend several months looking for someone to cast as Pi. Lee stated that water was a major inspiration behind making the film in 3D: "I thought this was a pretty impossible movie to make technically. It's so expensive for what it is. You sort of have to disguise a philosophical book as an adventure story. I thought of 3-D half a year before 'Avatar' was on the screen. I thought water, with its transparency and reflection, the way it comes out to you in 3-D, would create a new theatrical experience and maybe the audience or the studio would open up their minds a little bit to accept something different." Following the premiere of the film, Lee stated that his desire to take risks and chances helped with his direction, saying "In a strange way it did feel like we're the vessels, we have to surrender to movie god. We have to let things happen. I just had this feeling, I'll follow this kid to wherever this movie takes me. I saw the movie start to unravel in front of me."

=== Pre-production and casting ===
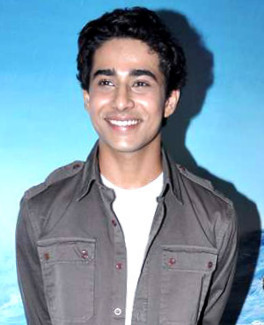
Suraj Sharma was selected to portray the 16-year-old Pi.

After 3,000 young men auditioned for the film's lead, in October 2010 Lee cast Suraj Sharma, a 17-year-old student and an acting newcomer. Upon receiving the role, Sharma underwent extensive training in ocean survival, and in yoga and meditation practices to prepare for the part. Two months after Sharma was cast, it was announced that Gérard Depardieu would play the role of the Cook, Irrfan Khan would play the adult Pi, and Adil Hussain would play Pi's father, while Tabu was in talks to play the role of Pi's mother.

Canadian actor Rajiv Surendra, who had played a small part in Mean Girls, was one of the auditioners for the role of Pi. In 2016, he published The Elephants in My Backyard, a memoir of his failed campaign to win the part. In an interview with Deccan Chronicle in 2017, American actor Naren Weiss revealed that he too unsuccessfully auditioned for the role of Pi.

In April 2011, it was announced that Tobey Maguire would be joining the film in the role originally referred to as "a reporter." In September 2012, it was announced that Lee had cut Maguire from the film: "to be consistent with the other casting choices made for the film, I decided to go with an entirely international cast"; Lee called Maguire "too jarringly recognizable". He reshot the scenes with Rafe Spall in the role of the book's actual author.

=== Filming ===
Principal photography for the film began on January 18, 2011, in Puducherry at the Holy Rosary Church in Muthialpet. Filming continued in Puducherry until January 31 and moved to other parts of India, including Munnar in Kerala, and Taiwan. The crew filmed in Taiwan for five and a half months in Taipei Zoo, an airport in Taichung, and Kenting National Park, in Pingtung County, where Lee was born. The ocean scenes were shot at a giant wave tank built by the crew in an abandoned airport. The tank is known as the world's largest self-generating wave tank, with a capacity of 1.7 million imperial gallons (7.7 Ml). With production scheduled to last two and a half months at the tank, cinematographer Claudio Miranda assisted in the tank's design in order to get the most out of it for lighting, explaining, "We knew we were going to be inside there shooting for 2.5 months, so it was worth it to be able to do anything we want. On all these kind of scenes, we had an idea of what the weather would be like. In that tank, I can create storm clouds, nightfall. We had curtains that I can block out [light], doors to open and let in real sunlight," Miranda says. "So lighting-wise, [the movie] had a big ebb and flow." After photography was completed in Taiwan, production moved back to India and concluded in Montreal into early 2012.

=== Visual effects ===
The main visual effects company for Life of Pi was Rhythm & Hues Studios (R&H). 3D effects for the film were created by a team of R&H artists in Los Angeles, Mumbai, Hyderabad, Kuala Lumpur, Vancouver and Kaohsiung.

The R&H VFX supervisor Bill Westenhofer said that discussions of the project began with Ang Lee in August 2009. Westenhofer noted that Lee "knew we had done the lion in the first Narnia movie. He asked, 'Does a digital character look more or less real in 3D?' We looked at each other and thought that was a pretty good question." He also stated that during these meetings, Lee said, "'I look forward to making art with you.' This was really for me one of the most rewarding things I've worked on and the first chance to really combine art with VFX. Every shot was artistic exploration, to make the ocean a character and make it interesting we had to strive to make it as visually stunning as possible." Rhythm & Hues spent a year on research and development, "building upon its already vast knowledge of CGI animation" to develop the tiger. The British Film Institute's Sight & Sound magazine suggested that, "Life of Pi can be seen as the film Rhythm & Hues has been building up to all these years, by taking things they learned from each production from Cats & Dogs to Yogi Bear, integrating their animals in different situations and environments, pushing them to do more, and understanding how all of this can succeed both visually and dramatically."

Artist Abdul Rahman in the Malaysian branch underscored the global nature of the effects process, saying that "the special thing about Life of Pi is that it was the first time we did something called remote rendering, where we engaged our cloud infrastructure in Taiwan called CAVE (Cloud Animation and Visual Effects)."

Additional visual effects studios that worked on the film include Moving Picture Company (MPC), yU+co, Buf, Crazy Horse Effects, Look Effects, Christov Effects, Lola VFX, Reliance Mediaworks, and Stereo D.

== Music ==
The film's musical score was composed by Mychael Danna, who had previously written the music to Lee's films The Ice Storm and Ride with the Devil. A soundtrack album of the music was released by Sony Classical Records on November 16, 2012. The album features the track "Pi's Lullaby", which was cowritten by Danna and Bombay Jayashri, who performs the song in Tamil.

== Distribution ==
=== Marketing ===
Due to the film's holiday release, Life of Pi's financial success was uncertain. Dorothy Pomerantz of Forbes said, "It looks like chances are very slim that the film will earn back its production and marketing costs let alone turn a profit." Pomerantz attributed this to the fact that film was not led by a big name star and faced other winter blockbusters. John Horn and Ben Fritz of the Los Angeles Times compared the film to Martin Scorsese's Hugo, a large-budget 3D film that opened during the 2011 Thanksgiving week. They said that Life of Pi could have ended up like Hugo by "failing to connect with moviegoers" and become a "financial failure". Similar speculation had been made by other news sources.

Whether or not Hurricane Sandy would affect the film's publicity was also a question. Because the film includes a massive storm, it was speculated that the recent storm might result in lower box office revenue due to the unintentional overtones of Sandy's devastation. A Fox spokesperson made note that there were no plans to change the film's marketing approach.

During the marketing campaign for Life of Pi, the film was promoted as "the next Avatar" in trailers and TV spots. James Cameron, the director of Avatar, later became the subject of two featurettes that focus on the film's 3D and computer-generated imagery. In addition, the original novel was re-released in a movie tie-in edition. This was later followed by the release of The Making of Life of Pi: A Film, a Journey, a book by Jean-Christophe Castelli that details how Life of Pi was brought to the big screen.

=== Theatrical release ===
Life of Pi had a wide release in the United States on November 21, 2012, in both traditional and 3D viewing formats. It was originally scheduled to be released on December 14, 2012, but when The Hobbit: An Unexpected Journey was announced for the same release date, Life of Pi was postponed a week. It was then brought forward a month.

=== Home media ===
Life of Pi was released on DVD, Blu-ray, and Blu-ray 3D in North America, on March 12, 2013. The film's 2D Blu-ray release contains many special features, including a one-hour making-of special entitled A Filmmaker's Epic Journey and two featurettes focusing on the film's visual effects, and two behind-the-scene looks at storyboarding and pre-production artwork. In addition, the film's 3D Blu-ray release contains five deleted scenes and a featurette entitled VFX Progressions that takes a look at what was shot and how it evolved to be what was rendered on screen. The film was later released on 4K Blu-ray and digital copy on March 8, 2016.

In the United Kingdom, it was the eighth best-selling film of 2013 on physical home video formats.

== Reception ==
=== Box office ===
Life of Pi grossed US$124,772,844 in North America, and US$484,029,542 in other countries, for a worldwide total of US$609,006,177. During its opening on the extended Thanksgiving weekend, the film debuted in 2,902 theaters throughout the United States and Canada and grossed US$30,573,101. In mainland China, from November 22 to December 24, the film topped the box office for three weeks, and grossed over US$91 million. As of January 24, 2013, it had also topped the box office for three weeks in Australia and Chile, and four weeks in Mexico and Peru. The film became the highest-grossing Hollywood film of the year in India, and was the tenth highest-grossing Hollywood release in the country. Life of Pi has earned HK$45,058,653 (US$5.8 million) at the Hong Kong box office, making it the highest grossing Ang Lee film in Hong Kong. In the United Kingdom and Ireland, it grossed £28.7 million (US$45.34 million) by February 2013. At the annual 2012 UK and Ireland box office, it was the year's eighth highest-grossing film, third highest-grossing 3D film, highest-grossing adventure film, and highest-grossing PG-rated film.

=== Critical response ===
Life of Pi has an 86% approval rating on the review aggregator website Rotten Tomatoes based on 253 reviews with an average rating of 7.90/10. The website's critical consensus reads, "A 3D adaptation of a supposedly 'unfilmable' book, Ang Lee's Life of Pi achieves the near impossible – it's an astonishing technical achievement that's also emotionally rewarding." On Metacritic, the film has an average score of 79 out of 100, based on 44 reviews, indicating "generally favorable" reviews. Audiences polled by CinemaScore gave the film an average grade of "A-" on an A+ to F scale.

Roger Ebert of the Chicago Sun-Times gave Life of Pi four stars out of four, referring to it as "a miraculous achievement of storytelling and a landmark of visual mastery" and "one of the best films of the year". He particularly praised the film's use of 3D that he described as "deepen[ing] the film's sense of places and events". Similarly, Peter Travers of Rolling Stone highlighted the use of 3D in the film suggesting that "like Hugo, from Martin Scorsese, Life of Pi puts 3D in the hands of a worldclass film artist. (Ang) Lee uses 3D with the delicacy and lyricism of a poet. You don't just watch this movie, you live it." Parmita Borah of Eastern Fare says, "There is this one scene in particular where the entire ocean is covered with jelly fish which makes you feel like 'this is what heaven must look like'."

The Los Angeles Times critic Betsy Sharkey referred to the film as a "masterpiece", stating that:

There is always a poetic aesthetic that Lee brings to his best work – the brutal martial arts ballet of Crouching Tiger, Hidden Dragon or the homophobic hatred against the backcountry grandeur of Brokeback Mountain. which would win him an Oscar for directing in 2006. In Life of Pi, certainly given its technological achievements, the filmmaker has raised the bar. Not since James Cameron's breathtaking blue Avatar in 2009 has 3-D had such impact.

In an interview with the Los Angeles Times, Cameron himself highlighted the film's use of 3D, noting that

Life of Pi breaks the paradigm that 3-D has to be some big, action fantasy spectacle, superhero movie ... The movie is visually amazing, inventive, and it works on you in ways you're not really aware of. It takes you on a journey, and unless you've read the book – which I hadn't – you have no idea where that journey is going. It does what good 3-D is supposed to do, which is, it allows you to forget you're watching a 3-D movie.

According to French journalist Marjolaine Gout, the film is "a philosophical tale where Noah's Ark metamorphoses into The Raft of the Medusa". She adds that it is "a visual masterpiece" in which "Ang Lee proves, once again, his talent as a universal storyteller". She also writes about the visual poetry of the movie reminding viewers of the works of classical painters and the symbolism of kolams. The film got 8 out of 10 stars, the readers gave 7 stars.

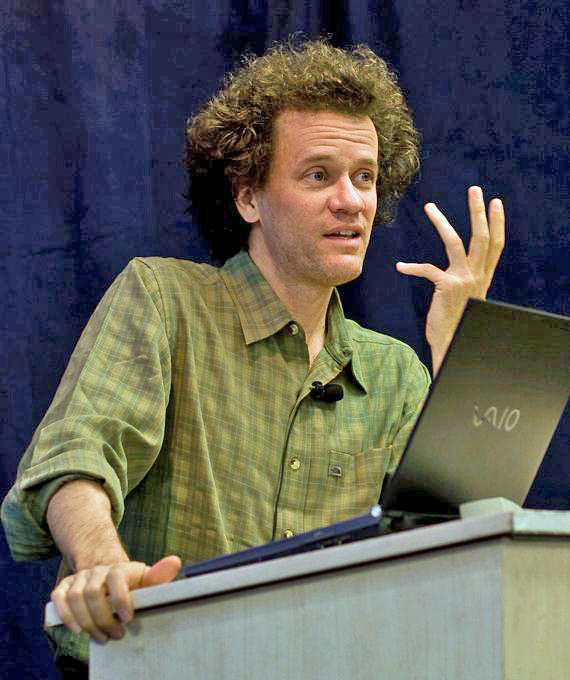
Yann Martel, author of the book Life of Pi, gave positive feedback upon seeing the film.

The novel's author, Yann Martel, found the film to be a "delightful" adaptation, saying,

I'm happy it works so well as a film. Even if the ending is not as ambiguous as the book's, the possibility that there might be another version of Pi's story comes at you unexpectedly and raises the same important questions about truth, perception and belief.

A. O. Scott of The New York Times was critical of the film's narrative frame, arguing that "the movie invites you to believe in all kinds of marvelous things, but it also may cause you to doubt what you see with your own eyes – or even to wonder if, in the end, you have seen anything at all". Scott further criticized the film for repressing the darker themes of the tale. Nick Schager of The Village Voice also panned the film, stating: "A stacked-deck theological inquiry filtered through a Titanic-by-way-of-Slumdog Millionaire narrative, Life of Pi manages occasional spiritual wonder through its 3-D visuals but otherwise sinks like a stone". Peter Bradshaw of The Guardian gave the film 2 out of 5 stars, and states "despite some lovely images and those eyepopping effects, it is a shallow and self-important shaggy-dog story – or shaggy-tiger story … It deserves every technical prize going."

Richard Corliss of Time selected the film as the third-best movie of 2012, and called it the next Avatar.

The film was noted for containing a "subtle, artistic warning" about the dangers of increased anthropogenic carbon dioxide emissions and ocean acidification. The scene of the acidic island Pi and Richard Parker encounter was compared to Aragonese Castle in the Tyrrhenian Sea near Naples and Richard Parker's final dismissive departure representing the "not too pleasant face of Gaia".

=== Accolades ===
Life of Pi was nominated for eleven Academy Awards and won four (more than any other film from 2012): Best Director (Ang Lee), Best Cinematography (Claudio Miranda), Best Visual Effects (Bill Westenhofer, Guillaume Rocheron, Erik-Jan de Boer, and Donald R. Elliott), and Best Original Score (Mychael Danna). It was nominated for three Golden Globe Awards and won for Best Original Score.

=== Controversies and animal abuse allegations ===
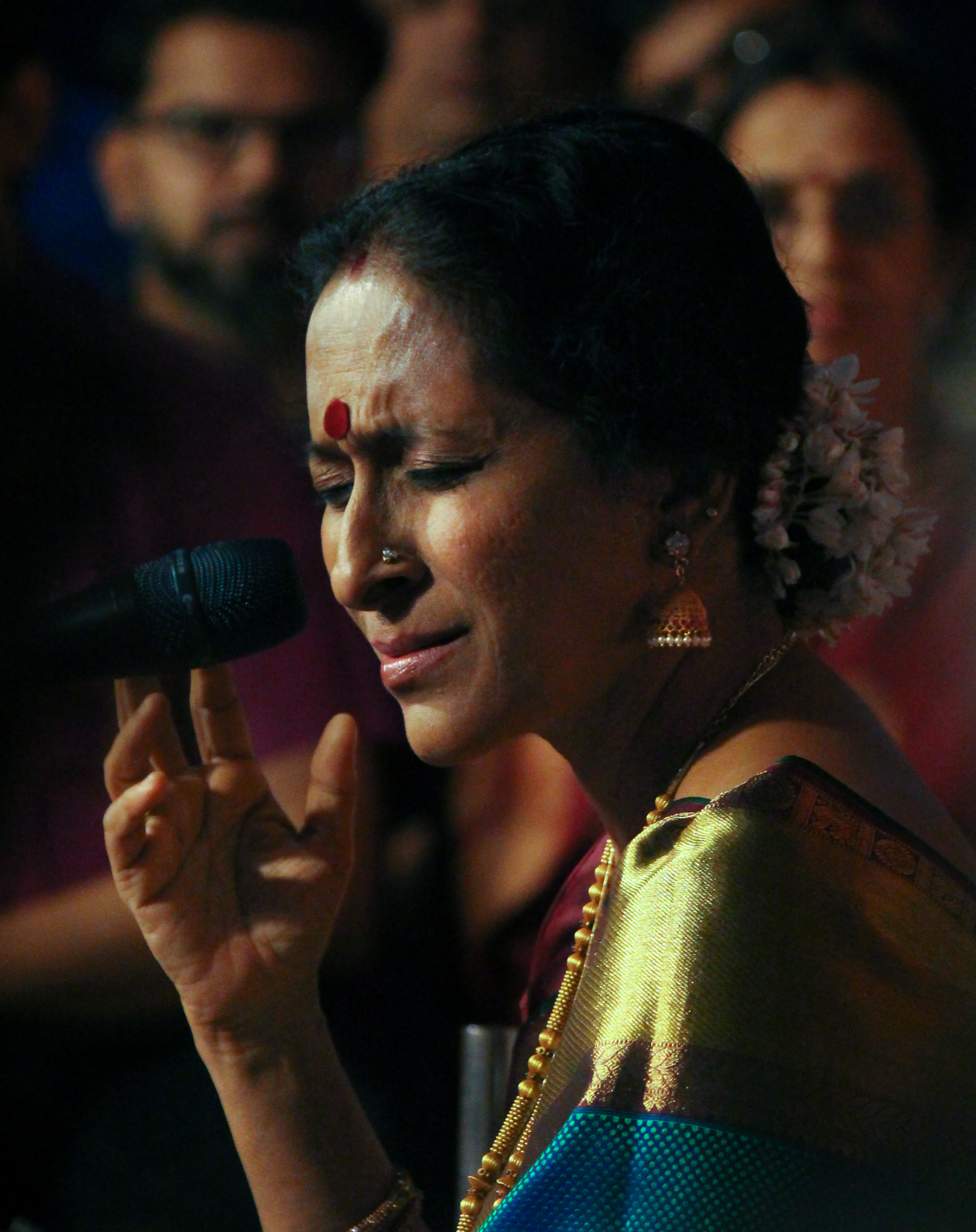
It was alleged that "Pi's Lullaby", performed and co-written by Bombay Jayashri (pictured, December 2017), used compositions by Irayimman Thampi. Jayashri denied this.

It won the Oscar for Best Visual Effects at the 2013 Academy Awards, but Rhythm & Hues Studios (which provided most of the visual effects for the film) was forced to file for bankruptcy on February 11, 2013, citing unfair competition from subsidized and tax-exempt foreign studios. This sparked a demonstration of nearly 500 VFX artists who protested outside the 2013 Academy Awards. Inside, during the Oscars, when R&H visual effects supervisor Bill Westenhofer brought up R&H during his acceptance speech, the microphone was cut off. This started an uproar among many visual effects industry professionals, changing profile pictures on social media such as Facebook and Twitter to show the green key color, in order to raise awareness for the issues the industry was facing. In addition director Ang Lee was criticized by the protest leader for his failure to thank the effect industry, "Ang thanked the crew, the actors, his agent, his lawyer and the entire population of Taiwan right down to the team that built the wave-pool on the soundstage where Pi was shot, but failed to mention hundreds of artists who made not only the main character of the tiger, but replaced that pool, making it look like a real ocean for 80% of his movie." He was also criticized for earlier complaining about the costs of visual effects. In February 2014, Christina Lee Storm and Scott Leberecht released the documentary Life After Pi to YouTube. The documentary details the role Rhythm & Hues played in Life of Pi and the consequent bankruptcy. Bill Westenhofer also discusses his experience at the Oscars as he accepted a Visual Effects award for Rhythm & Hues' work on Life of Pi.

A trust named after Carnatic musician Irayimman Thampi has accused Bombay Jayashri's Oscar-nominated song "Pi's Lullaby" of not being an original composition. The trust has alleged that the first eight lines of the song is a word-by-word translation of composer Thampi's lullaby in Malayalam "Omanathinkal Kidavo". Jayashri has denied the allegation. Earlier, Jayashri had used Thampi's lullaby in her album Vatsalyam, released in 2003.

A 2013 investigation by The Hollywood Reporter brought to light leaked emails suggesting that animals had been mistreated during filming though the American Humane Association put its "No Animals Were Harmed" certification on the film. In an April 7, 2011, email, AHA monitor Gina Johnson wrote, "last week we almost killed King", in reference to a tiger used for filming. The email goes on to suggest that the incident, in which the tiger apparently nearly drowned while filming a scene, would be "downplayed" in the official report to the AHA. Additionally, the exposé alleges that Johnson was involved in a romantic relationship with one of the film's producers, possibly representing a conflict of interest. Life of Pi director Ang Lee has described the animal abuse allegations as "an accident" in interviews. Following the publication of the Hollywood Reporter investigation, Gina Johnson resigned from her position with the AHA.

New animal welfare concerns were raised in 2015 when PETA released a video that showed Life of Pi animal trainer Michael Hackenberger swearing at and whipping a young tiger 19 times. In April 2016, the Ontario Society for the Prevention of Cruelty to Animals filed animal cruelty charges against Hackenberger based on the video evidence.

== See also ==
- José Salvador Alvarenga, a Salvadoran fisherman who spent more than 400 days adrift in a small boat in the Pacific Ocean.
- Survival film – Film genre depicting survival efforts
