= Erik-Jan de Boer =

Dutch animation director

- Born: March 1967 (age 58–59); Amsterdam, Netherlands
- Occupation: Visual effects supervisor
- Years active: 1989–present
- Employer: freelance
- Notable work: Avengers: Age of Ultron, Life of Pi, The A-Team, The Golden Compass, Night at the Museum, The Chronicles of Narnia: The Lion, the Witch and the Wardrobe, Elf, Stuart Little

Erik-Jan de Boer (born March 1967) is a freelance visual effects supervisor. Since 1989 he has worked on many commercials and Hollywood productions. For the 85th Academy Awards, he won the Academy Award for Best Visual Effects for his work on Life of Pi.

He is currently in production on Landscape with Invisible Hand a movie by director Cory Finley.
