= Bill Westenhofer =

American visual effects supervisor

Bill Westenhofer is an American visual effects supervisor. He worked for Rhythm and Hues Studios until its closure in 2013.

== Early life and education ==
His hometown is Brookfield, Connecticut, where he graduated from Brookfield High School in 1986. He then earned a Bachelor of Science in Computer Science and Engineering from Bucknell University in 1990.

Westenhofer also received his master's degree at the George Washington University School of Engineering and Applied Science in 1995, where he studied the use of dynamics in physically based animation.

== Career ==
In 1994, he joined Rhythm & Hues as a technical director, and Westenhofer's lighting and effects animation work was featured in Batman Forever and numerous commercials. He was promoted to CG supervisor for Speed 2: Cruise Control, and continued in that role for Spawn, Mouse Hunt, Kazaam and Waterworld. His other VFX supervisor credits include Elf, The Rundown, Stuart Little 2, Men in Black II, Cats & Dogs, Along Came a Spider, Frequency, Stuart Little, and Babe: Pig in the City.

In 2005, Westenhofer supervised a team of 400 digital artists on The Chronicles of Narnia: The Lion, the Witch and the Wardrobe, which was nominated for an Academy Award for Best Visual Effects. Later he would win both the BAFTA and the Academy Award for the 2007 release The Golden Compass, and 2012's Life of Pi in 2013. During the Academy Awards, when Westenhofer brought up Rhythm and Hues' financial issues during his speech, the microphone was cut off, which prompted many protests by the visual effects industry. He had intended to say:

"What I was trying to say up there is that at a time when visual effects movies are dominating the box office, visual effects companies are struggling," Westenhofer told reporters. "And I wanted to point out that we aren't technicians. Visual effects is not just a commodity that's being done by people pushing buttons. We're artists, and if we don't find a way to fix the business model, we start to lose the artistry. If anything, 'Life of Pi' shows that we're artists and not just technicians."

Westenhofer also worked as VFX supervisor for Wonder Woman, released in June 2017.

His latest project is Black Adam, which was released in October 2022.

== Appearances ==
Westenhofer was a keynote speaker at the 2015 Congress of Future Science and Technology Leaders.
