= Christophe Bernard =

Canadian writer from Quebec

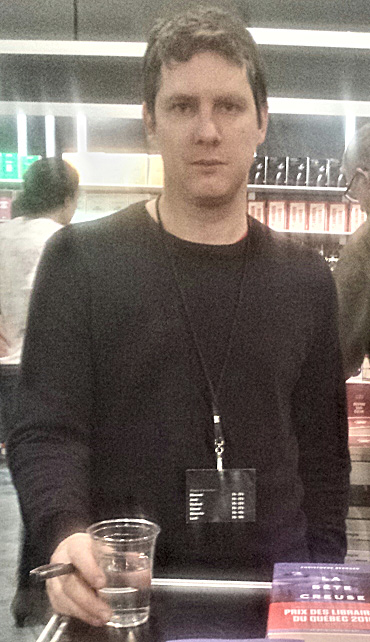
Christophe Bernard

Christophe Bernard (born 1982) is a Canadian writer from Quebec. He is most noted for his novel La bête creuse, which was a shortlisted finalist for the Governor General's Award for French-language fiction at the 2018 Governor General's Awards.

In addition to his writing, he works as a translator for the publishing house Le Quartanier. At the 2016 Governor General's Awards, he was shortlisted for the Governor General's Award for English to French translation for his translation of Yann Martel's novel The High Mountains of Portugal.

He was one of the winners, alongside Mishka Lavigne, of the Prix Québec-Ontario from the Salon du livre de Toronto in 2017, for La bête creuse.

Born in Maria, Quebec and raised in Rimouski, he currently lives in Vermont.
