= Émile Martel (writer) =

Canadian diplomat and writer (1941–2023)

Émile Martel OC
- Born: August 10, 1941; Amos, Quebec, Canada
- Died: November 22, 2023 (aged 82)
- Occupations: Poet, short story writer
- Relatives: Yann Martel (son); Réginald Martel (brother)
- Writing career
- Period: 1960s–1990s
- Notable work: Pour orchestre et poète seul

Émile Martel OC (August 10, 1941 – November 22, 2023) was a Canadian diplomat and writer who won the Governor General's Award for French-language poetry in 1995 for his poetry collection Pour orchestre et poète seul.

== Life and career ==
Martel was born in Amos, Quebec on August 10, 1941. Educated at the University of Ottawa, Université Laval and the University of Salamanca, he taught French and Spanish literature in Canada and the United States before joining Canada's Department of External Affairs as a diplomat. He published both poetry and short stories.

Martel died on November 22, 2023, at the age of 82. He was the father of Canadian novelist Yann Martel and the brother of Réginald Martel.

== Works ==
- Les enfances brisées (1969)
- L'ombre du silence (1974)
- Les gants jetés (1977)
- Dictionnaire de cristal
- Pour orchestre et poète seul (1995)
  - English translation by D. G. Jones, For Orchestra and Solo Poet (1996)
- Translation of Life of Pi into French: Histoire de Pi (2003), with Nicole Perron
