= Tomislav Torjanac =

Croatian illustrator (born 1972)

Tomislav Torjanac (born 1972) is a Croatian illustrator, who works mostly in oil paints combined with a digital medium. His creative process is very physical in the paint handling and is characterized by rich impastos.

In 2006 Torjanac won the international competition to illustrate a new edition of Yann Martel’s 2002 Man Booker Prize-winning novel Life of Pi. The competition was run by Scottish publisher Canongate Books, UK newspaper The Times, Australian newspaper The Age and Canadian newspaper The Globe and Mail. The illustrated edition was published by Canongate Books in September 2007.

Torjanac also illustrated a number of picture books, including James Joyce's The Cat and the Devil. He participated in a number of group exhibitions in Croatia and abroad, and had a solo show in London. His artwork was included in Spectrum: The Best in Contemporary Fantastic Art illustration annual in 2006 and 2007.
