= One Man Army =

One Man Army may refer to:

- A one-man army, often a trope of action films, a heavily armed and well-trained combatant able to single-handedly fight a much larger enemy force.

== In music ==
- One Man Army (band), an American punk rock band that formed in 1996 and dissolved in 2005
- "One Man Army" (song), a 1999 single released by rock band Our Lady Peace
- "One Man Army" (Kassidy album), 2012
- "One Man Army" (Ensiferum album), 2015
- One Man Army and the Undead Quartet, a Swedish death metal band that formed in 2004
- OneManArmy, a hip hop M.C. also known as One Be Lo
- Jezper Söderlund, known as "One Man Army", a Swedish record producer
- The One Man Army, a 2005 album by Hardstyle DJ Radical Redemption
- "One Man Army", a song by DaBaby from Baby on Baby 2, 2022

== Other uses ==
- One Man Army (TV series), a Discovery Channel television show
- The One Man Army (1973 novel), by Moacyr Scliar
- Léo Major, a French-Canadian soldier in WWII and the Korean War
- Arthur W. Wermuth, known as the One Man Army of Bataan for his actions against the Japanese in the Philippines
- Johnny Seven OMA (One Man Army), a top selling 1964 toy gun
- Minute-Man, a Fawcett Comics/DC Comics superhero described as a "one-man army"

== See also ==
- Army of One (disambiguation)
- One Woman Army (disambiguation)
- Meri Jung: One Man Army, Hindi title of the 2004 Indian Telugu-language film Mass
- Meri Jung: One Man Army, Hindi title of the 2013 Indian Telugu-language film Shadow
