= Tuizelo =

- Civil parish
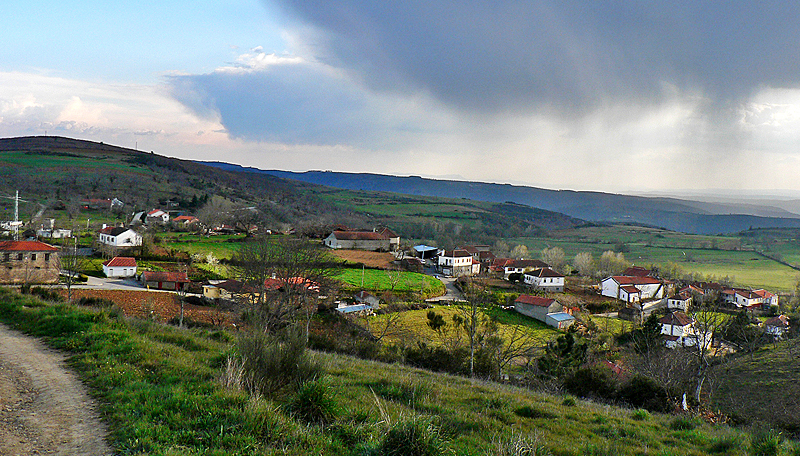

- Location in Portugal
- Coordinates: 41°53′44″N 7°03′13″W
- Country: Portugal
- Region: Norte
- Intermunic. comm.: Terras de Trás-os-Montes
- District: Bragança
- Municipality: Vinhais

Area
  - Total: 34.8 km^{2} (13.4 sq mi)

Population (2011)
  - Total: 387
  - Density: 11.1/km^{2} (28.8/sq mi)
- Time zone: UTC+00:00 (WET)
  - Summer (DST): UTC+01:00 (WEST)

Tuizelo is a Portuguese freguesia (parish) of the municipality of Vinhais, Bragança district, with 34,80 km^{2} of area and 387 inhabitants (2011); it has a population density of only 11.1 inhabitants per square kilometer.

Located in the north of the municipality, about 12 kilometers from Vinhais, the access is made by EN 316 road. The freguesia houses the villages of Tuizelo, Peleias, Salgueiros, Quadra, Nuzedo de Cima, Cabeça de Igreja, and Revelhe.

== History ==
The area where lies Tuizelo was inhabited before the twelfth century AD, according to the remains of ancient peoples in the region (such as castrejos). Tuizelo derives from the Germanic word "Teodicellus" which is a historical name of a Visigoth king of the Peninsula.

== In popular culture ==
The High Mountains of Portugal, book by Yann Martel is partially set in Tuizelo.

== Gallery ==
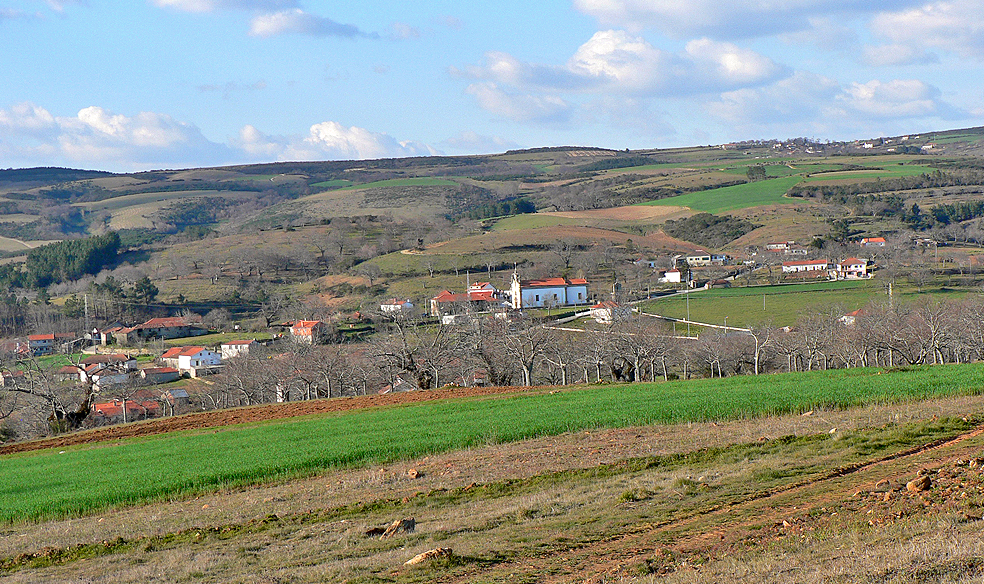
Tuizelo, "cimo do povo"

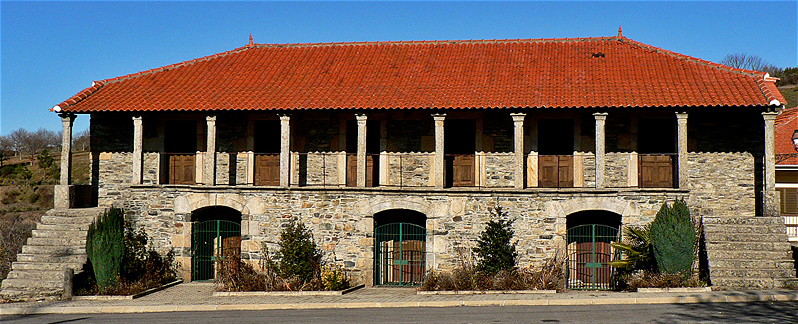
Casa da Santa, Tuizelo

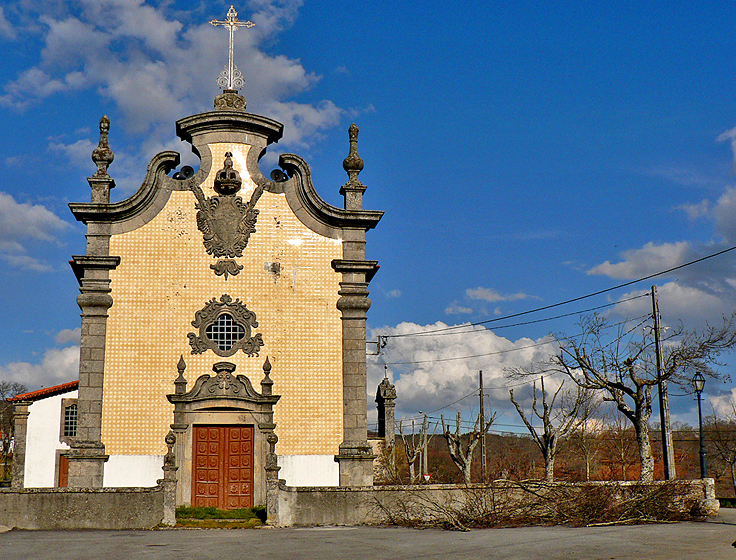
Sanctuary of Nossa Sra. dos Remédios

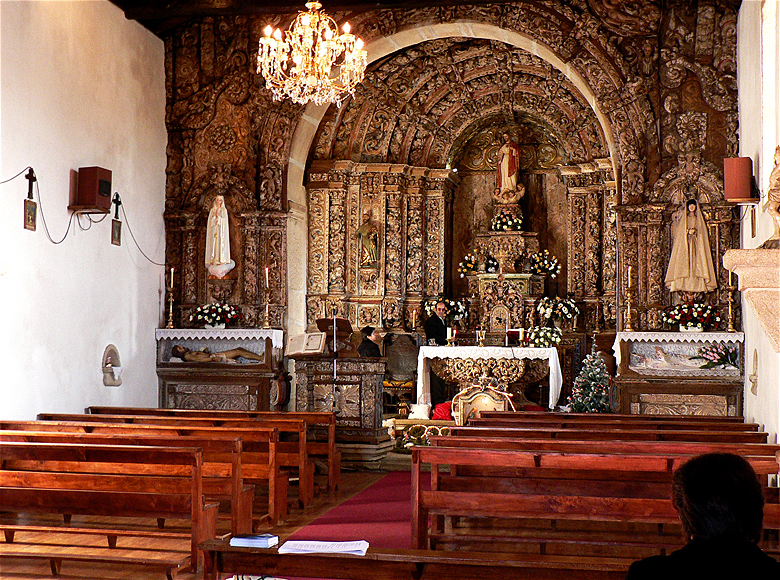
Interior of Church of Santo André

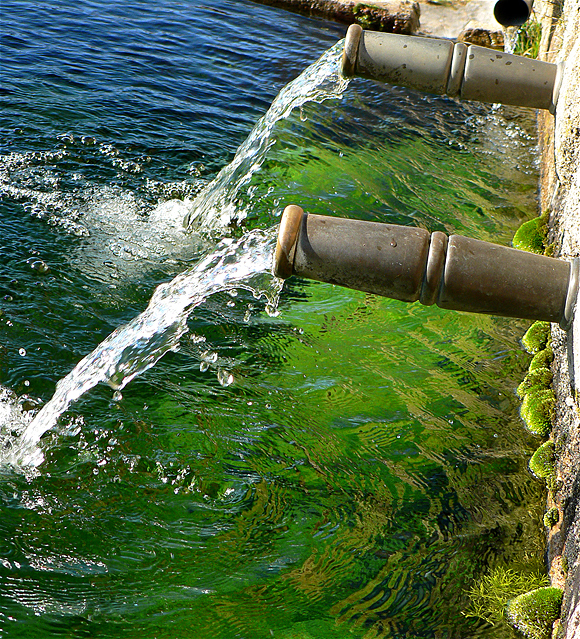
Bicas da Fonte da Senhora

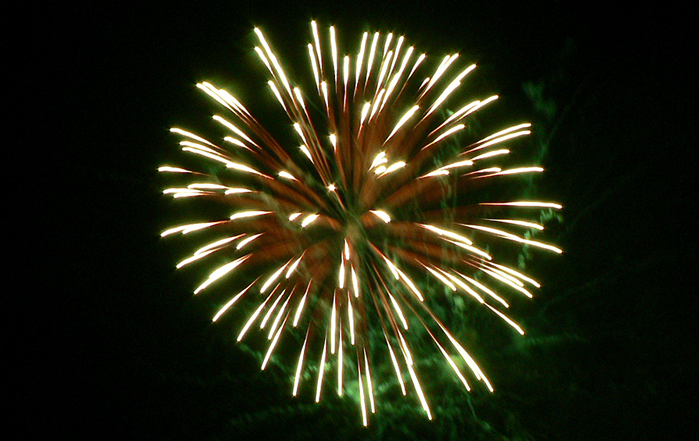
Fireworks, Tuizelo

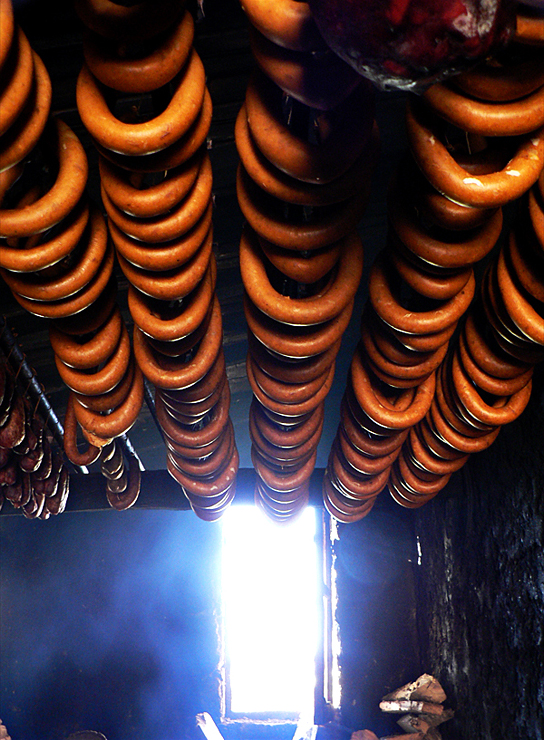
Smokehouse, Tuizelo
