= Owa =

Owa or OWA may refer to:

- Owa language, a language of the Solomon Islands
- Ōwa, an era in Japanese history
- Owa Obokun Adimula, the title of the traditional ruler of the Ijesha people of Nigeria
- Owa (dance), a traditional dance of Tripura, India
- Owa, a variant of Oba (ruler), a Nigeria title for a ruler, used among the Ijesha

== Acronyms ==
- One-way attack drone, a type of self-destructive unmanned aerial vehicle
- One Woman Army (disambiguation)
- Open Web Analytics, open source web analytics software
- Open Wireless Architecture, an element of 4G cellular phone technology
- Open-world assumption, formal reasoning with incomplete knowledge
- Optimized wideband array antenna, a type of Yagi–Uda antenna
- Ordered weighted averaging aggregation operator, a class of operator used in fuzzy logic
- Outlook Web App, a web-based email client, now part of Outlook on the web
