= Mark Pearce (actor) =

Actor

Mark Pearce (born 1976 in Coventry) is a British actor.

At the age of 12 Pearce made his professional stage debut in Cinderella at Belgrade Theatre Coventry.

He went on to study English and Drama at University College of St. Martin's Lancaster before heading to London to study acting at the Central School of Speech and Drama.

Notable credits include his portrayal of 'Fletcher' originally played by Ronnie Barker, in the stage adaptation of the BBC sitcom Porridge at The Lowry Manchester, written by the original writers Dick Clement and Ian La Frenais.

Pearce created the role of Uncle Mamaji in the world premiere of Yann Martel's Life of Pi in 2007.

In 2009 he performed in a UK tour of Allo Allo, and originated the role of "Hospital Ghost" in the original world premiere production of Matthew Warchus’s Ghost the Musical in Manchester.

Recent West-End appearances include Del Boy in Only Fools and Horses (Theatre Royal Haymarket), Sheriff in Tim Minchin's Groundhog Day (Old Vic directed by Matthew Warchus),Thénardier in Les Misérables at Sondheim Theatre and West End Live (2022)

He also appeared on the final of Britain's Got Talent with the cast of Les Mis

His commercial work includes playing ‘Bruno’ for Swiss Tourism, which has had over 5.6 million views and he is the face and voice of the Taylors of Harrogate campaign (2023).

He plays 'Time Thief Terry' in the CBBC series Odd Squad (2024)

In 2026 it was announced that Mark will be joining the cast of Billy Elliot The Musical playing the principal role of 'George' in the UK tour & West End.
