= Dead Girls (short story collection) =

2002 short story collection by Nancy Lee

- Author: Nancy Lee
- Language: English
- Genre: Short Stories
- Published: 2002
- Publisher: McClelland & Stewart Ltd.
- Publication place: Canada
- ISBN: 0-7710-5251-0

Dead Girls is a Canadian short story collection by author Nancy Lee and was originally published in 2002 by McClelland & Stewart Ltd. Each story in the collection stars different characters, and all deal with the themes of eroticism, destruction, power, and loss. Dead Girls is Lee's debut novel and draws its inspiration from the missing women of Vancouver between 1978 and 2001.

== Background ==
Reportedly, much of the novel was inspired by the BC Missing Women Investigation, which covered the disappearances of over 60 women from Vancouver's Downtown Eastside between 1978 and 2001. Lee was working as a publicist in an office near Vancouver's Downtown Eastside during this time, and was constantly aware of the sex workers on the streets. While the missing women's case was ongoing, Lee recalled an editorial which compared the missing women's case to a series of garage-robberies, in which the editorial asked why the robberies incited $50,000 rewards for anyone with information, but the missing women's case offered no such thing.

When Lee sifted through "stacks of government research papers documenting teenage prostitution," she discovered that many of the sex-workers in that area were actually lured, tricked, or coerced into the profession. Dead Girls is Lee's commentary on the girls in Vancouver's Downtown Eastside, and the collection aims to imagine and capture the experiences of these women.

== Plot ==
While each of the stories in Nancy Lee's breakout novel are varied in subject matter, they are united by themes of eroticism, destruction, loss, and the recurring image of the missing and murdered women of Vancouver's Downtown Eastside. The images of these women are subtly inserted into each story via television screens, or comments about jury duty.

=== Associated Press ===
A woman is caught between two men titled this boy, and that boy. That boy is an adventurous photographer who hopes to aid humanity. The woman and that boy correspond through email messages and phone calls. However, that boy doesn’t write often. This boy is a rich man, and seems to care for the woman, buying her expensive gifts and speaking of love. He ends up getting her pregnant, but she decides to have an abortion. They end up breaking up.

=== Sally, in Parts ===
Sally, a breast cancer survivor and hand model, explores her relationship with her dying father. Lee has stated that this story is rooted in the Electra myth and observes the taboo subject of sexual tension between a father and daughter. The story is divided into the following sections: Sally's eyes, Sally's hands, Sally's breasts, Sally's teeth, Sally's vagina, Sally's ears, Sally's lips, Sally's feet, and Sally's bones.

=== Valentines ===
Three teenagers—Jess, Charlie, and Kyle—spend Valentine's Day together at Kyle's house. Jess receives a pair of hoop earrings from Charlie as a Valentine's Day instead of a locket, like she had asked for, and she pierces her ears in the upstairs washroom with ice and a sewing needle. Meanwhile, Charlie and Kyle are downstairs talking about the way Jess was flirting with Kyle. The two then make a transaction; Kyle will hand over $50 for Jess to have sex with him. As the night progresses, the three get increasingly drunk, culminating in Jess sleeping with Kyle. Charlie and Jess then leave Kyle's house. The two get into a verbal argument which escalates to physical assault.

=== Dead Girls ===
This story is told from the eyes of a mother who is desperate to find her missing sex worker daughter named Clare. This desperation is heightened by the discovery of a serial killer, and a number of human remains in a retired dentist's backyard. During this time, the woman and her husband are in the process of selling their house, the one Clare grew up in. This, along with her daughter's disappearance, causes her relationship with her husband to become tense. It becomes clear that the mother is unwilling to let go of the image of an innocent Clare, or move on. Clare however, has a strong desire for distance from her family. Although Clare is never found, the mother is able to feel closer to her daughter by walking in the Downtown Eastside and experiencing things the way her daughter does.

=== East ===
Two women, Jemma and Annie, go on a kind of road trip in an attempt to escape the trouble in their lives. The story begins with the death of a dog; Jemma's husband, Marcus, had purchased the dog in an attempt to please his family. After it is run over however, Jemma is the one who must bury it. She starts driving to escape the realities of her divorce with Marcus, who is planning take their children away to Ontario. While she cries to Annie, Jemma admits that Marcus "is the better parent." Annie purposefully chose an ugly man to date in the hopes that this relationship would be more successful. Yet, she believes her boyfriend is planning to break up with her.

=== Young Love ===
As a favour for her friend Janet, a drug-addicted nurse supervises a high-school dance-a-thon that aims to raise money for a drug awareness program. The story follows the nurse throughout the night: she greets the students’ parents, imagines an affair with Janet's husband, Paul, and she has an affair with one of the students. Nancy Lee has stated that she conducted research on pharmaceutical addiction in the medical profession in order to inform the story, and that the drug-addicted nurse is an example of how people often spend their lives trying to hide something.

=== Rollie and Adele ===
Adele is living on the streets and is running quickly out of money. She wakes up one morning outside of a tattoo parlor and is let inside by the owner, Rollie. He feeds her and lets her take a shower. From there on, the story follows their relationship as she starts living with him, spending her days lounging in the store with the customers and spending her nights either sleeping with Rollie, or taking his bed while he sleeps elsewhere. Their sexual relationship is difficult and after one failed attempt at intercourse, they awkwardly avoid further attempts despite Rollie still having desires for Adele.

Every week, the both of them goes to visit Rollie's mother, who lives alone and is mourning the death of her husband. She and Rollie do not get along very well, but Adele pities her. Towards the end of the story, Rollie's mother gives him a ring, thinking that he might ask Adele to marry him. On his way back to the store, Rollie looks into the window and finds Adele having sex with a customer that he had pushed towards her.

=== Sisters ===
Two sisters in high-school, Grace and Nita, are exposed to the same temptations by a stranger named Kevin. The two sisters make opposing decisions; Nita ends up running away from home with Kevin. The two move to Vancouver, where Nita's life becomes increasingly difficult as she falls into drugs and is constantly in the need for money. Kevin later contacts Grace to ask for money and Nita begins calling Grace to reconnect with her. When Nita disappears, Grace moves to Vancouver to search for her sister, piecing together what she can about Nita's life. Lee comments that she wanted to show, through this story, "how easy it is to do things that later on seem so obviously wrong."

== Reception ==
Dead Girls has received widespread acclaim from critics, with many citing its well-written prose and subtle examination of its subject matter being particularly strong characteristics. In his review for The Guardian, Colin Greenland writes, "Graceful and wintry, Nancy Lee's stories describe with beautiful, desolate precision a society that is itself dismembered, riven by loss and hunger."

Now Magazine gave the book five stars and named it as book of the year for 2002. Their review states that "Lee has written a book that has an unforgettable sense of urgency. Remember the name."

Robert Wiersema, in his review for Quill & Quire, praised Dead Girls for being "among the bravest fictional debuts in recent memory [heralding] the arrival of a bold and audacious new voice in Canadian writing."

Following the opening of a police investigation into the deaths and disappearances of women in Vancouver's downtown Eastside, Lee's book attracted notoriety and rose to prominence for its own investigation into the matter. In his 2004 article for Canadian Literature, Michael Trussler commented, "While I suspect that this correspondence between her fiction and actuality dismays her, in her collection I believe that Lee's readers will recognize the intricacy and compassion."

=== Audience ===
Dead Girls has also been shortlisted for the 2003 Ethel Wilson Fiction Prize and has received a number of awards; the book placed third for the 2003 Danuta Gleed Literary Award and was named Book of the Year by NOW Magazine, A Globe and Mail Book of the Year, A Vancouver Sun Book of the Year, and A Toronto Star Book of the Year.

== Media Adaptation ==
A film adaptation of Dead Girls' "Valentines" was produced by Opus 39 Films in 2008. The short revolves around the theme of sex and money, stars Emily Tennant, Calum Worthy, and Anthony Shim, and was produced by Selena Paskalidis, Les Lukacs, Jhod Cardinal, and award-winning filmmaker and production company owner John Bolton. The film premiered at the Vancouver International Film Festival, and won "Best Film" at the Reel 2 Real Film Festival. Actress Emily Tennant received the 2009 Leo Award for "Best Actress" for her role as Jess.
