= Max and the Cats =

Book by Moacyr Scliar

- Author: Moacyr Scliar
- Original title: Max e os Felinos
- Translator: Eloah F. Giacomelli 1990, 2003
- Language: Portuguese
- Subject: Nazi Germany, escaping the past, the power of fear
- Genre: Novel
- Publisher: L&PM Editores Ltda, Brazil
- Publication date: 1981
- Pages: 99 pages (L&OD 2003 paperback)
- ISBN: 978-0-88619-418-5

Max and the Cats is a 1981 novella by Brazilian writer and physician Moacyr Scliar. It was first published in Portuguese, then published in English in 1990. It tells the story of Max Schmidt, born in Berlin in 1912, who comes of age just before the Nazis take power. After offending them by having an affair with a married woman, Max is forced to flee the country. He ends up on a ship bound for Brazil that sinks as part of an insurance scam and finds himself trapped in a dinghy with a jaguar—one of a number of zoo animals caged in the hold—but after being rescued and making a life for himself in Brazil continues to find his German past impossible to escape.

The novel came to widespread public attention in 2002 when Canadian writer Yann Martel won the Man Booker Prize for Life of Pi. Martel's novel is about a boy, Pi, who finds himself trapped on a boat with a tiger after the ship he and his family are sailing on sinks. The family were zookeepers, and the animals they were transporting in the hold sink with the rest of the ship, except for a tiger and some others who make it onto the lifeboat with Pi. In Life of Pi's acknowledgments, Martel thanked Scliar for "the spark of life," but later said he had not read Scliar's novel, only a review of it.

== Plot ==
Max is forced to flee Nazi Germany after he and his friend, Harald, have an affair with Frida, whose husband denounces them to the Gestapo for inappropriate behaviour. He flees the country on the Germania, a ship bound for Santos, Brazil, with zoo animals in the hold and very few passengers, but the captain is involved in an insurance scam, and the ship is deliberately sunk. Max finds a dinghy on board with some provisions, and manages to lower it into the sea. The next day the sun is beating down on him, and he fears for his life without cover. He reaches out for a large closed box that has fallen from the ship next to him, hoping he can use it for shelter, but when he opens the padlock, something jumps out of the box and into the dinghy, knocking him unconscious. When he opens his eyes, "[t]he howl that he let out resounded in the air." Sitting on the bench in front of him is a jaguar.

Max and the jaguar are stranded on the dinghy together for days, with only some basic provisions stored in the dinghy for emergencies. Max decides to start fishing to make sure the jaguar is not hungry, and briefly wonders whether he could train him. A shark approaches at one point, but the jaguar bats it away, saving them both; Max is so grateful that he hugs the animal, then pulls himself away in horror. At the very moment Max decides he cannot stand being alone with the jaguar anymore—after watching him tear a seagull apart—the jaguar appears to have a similar thought, and they both lunge at each other, colliding in midair. Max loses consciousness, and when he opens his eyes finds he has been rescued by a Brazilian ship. He asks about the jaguar, but the sailors assume he is delirious.
