= Alice Kuipers =

British writer (born 1979)

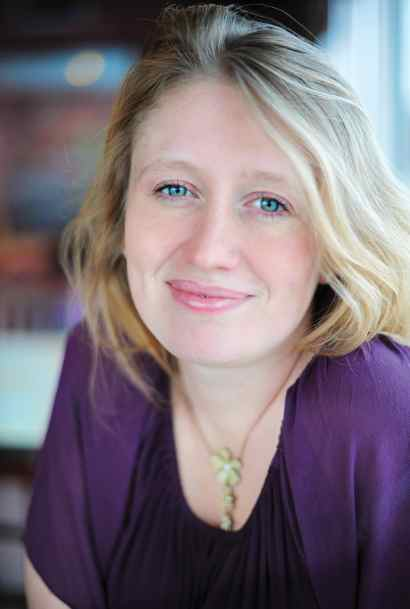
- Kuipers in 2013
- Born: 29 June 1979 (age 47); London, United Kingdom
- Citizenship: United Kingdom, Canada
- Education: University of Manchester
- Occupation: Novelist
- Partner: Yann Martel (2002–present)
- Children: 4
- Writing career
- Period: 2007–present
- Genres: Young adult, children's
- Notable works: Life on the Refrigerator Door, 40 Things I Want To Tell You, The Worst Thing She Ever Did (Lost For Words in the U.S.), The Death of Us, Me (and) Me
- Website: alicekuipers.com

Alice Kuipers (born 29 June 1979) is a British author living in Saskatchewan, Canada, who is best known for her young adult novels. Life on the Refrigerator Door won the Grand Prix de Viarmes, the Livrentête Prize, the Redbridge Teenage Book Award in 2008 and the Saskatchewan First Book Award in 2007, was narrated as an audio book by Amanda Seyfried and Dana Delany, and has been adapted for theater in England, France and Japan. 40 Things I Want To Tell You won a Saskatchewan Book Award for Young Adult Literature in 2013. The Worst Thing She Ever Did (Lost For Words in the U.S.) won the Arthur Ellis Award for Best Juvenile/YA Crime Book in 2011.

== Early life ==
Kuipers was born the first of three children in London, England, and is of Dutch and English descent. She attended Westminster School in London, before receiving a Bachelor of Science in psychology from the University of Manchester. She later graduated with Distinction with a Master of Arts degree in Writing from Manchester Metropolitan University. Her mother is Head of the Department of Psychology at King's College London, and a Professor of Clinical Psychology. Her father works as an advisor to local and central government on criminal and civil justice systems, and was previously a Chair of Governors and troubleshooting at OFSTED.

At the age of 18, Kuipers travelled alone for a year with an itinerary that included the Cook Islands, New Zealand, Cambodia, Australia, Vietnam and the U.S., which she has stated had a significant influence on her work. In an interview with Chatelaine magazine, Kuipers said, "I could spend my whole life exploring it [the world] and never come close to seeing everything there is to see... I learned not to worry too much if I took a wrong step. Something would come of whichever route I chose."

Kuipers moved to Saskatchewan, Canada and settled there in 2003. She lives in Saskatoon, with her husband, the writer Yann Martel, and their four young children.

== Career ==
Kuipers' debut young adult novel in 2007, Life on the Refrigerator Door, sold in 28 countries and was the winner of the Saskatchewan First Book Award, the Sheffield Libraries Choice Award and the Grand Prix de Viarmes. It was long-listed for the Carnegie Medal. The audio version of the novel was narrated by Amanda Seyfried and Dana Delany in 2007. It was adapted for theatre and staged in London, England, in 2014 and in Paris, France, in 2016. Life on the Refrigerator Door is told through a series of notes and post-its written from a mother to her fifteen-year-old daughter before and during a family crisis.

Kuipers' second young adult novel in 2010, The Worst Thing She Ever Did (Lost For Words in the U.S.), sold in 9 territories and won the Arthur Ellis Award, Best Juvenile/YA Crime Book 2011 and the OLA White Pine Official Selection 2011. This novel deals with confronting past tragedy and is set in London, England.

40 Things I Want To Tell You was published in 2012 and rights were sold in Germany, Greece, Denmark and Croatia. It won a Saskatchewan Book Award for Young Adult Literature in 2013 and was a 2013 Young Adult Honour Book for the Canadian Library Association. Kuipers' third novel is about a teenage writer of an on-line advice column for teenagers, who is unable to follow her own good advice.

In 2014, three books by Kuipers were published. The Death of Us, a young adult novel, is a coming of age story about two young girls involved in a deadly car accident. As well, The Best Ever Bookworm Book, by Violet and Victor Small, a book for children illustrated by Bethanie Murguia, and Lost and Curious Things, an interactive ebook, were published.

In 2015, Kuipers' short story, Ten Minutes, "the raw, beautiful story of a young woman's journey towards self-awareness and wellness" was released. Two more books by Kuipers were published in 2016: Violet and Victor Write the Most Fabulous Fairytale, again with illustrator Bethanie Murguia, as well as Secrets of the Badlands, an interactive ebook. In 2017, Kuipers released another young adult novel, Me (and) Me, about a rising rock star, forced to make a terrible choice "and in that moment her world splits into two distinct lives".

Kuipers' non-fiction has been published in Easy Living Magazine, the Sunday Telegraph and the Bristol Review of Books. She has also written for the children's market.

Since 1999, Kuipers has led writing workshops in Hong Kong, the UK, Australia, Canada and the US, including a workshop in the Yukon in 2004. She has been an invited lecturer and workshop leader at several festivals, including Montreal Blue Met Festival, Brisbane Festival of Literature, The Word on the Street Saskatoon, Wordfest Calgary, and The Vancouver Writers Fest, and was keynote presenter at the Saskatchewan Festival of Words in 2010.

In 2008, she won the Saskatchewan Lieutenant Governor's Artists Award '30 Below' for young artists. In 2010, she spent a year as Saskatoon Public Library Writer in Residence, working with community groups, individuals, teaching workshops and visiting schools.

Kuipers worked with software developer, Rich Lowenberg, to create the first Writing Tips App for iPhone, which went on to be the second bestselling app in the Educational Apps Listings in both the US and Canada in 2010.

She is a writing coach at The Novelry.

== Published works ==
- Life on the Refrigerator Door (2007) ("ne t'inquiéte pas pour moi", French translation, 2008)
- 'You Today' (Short Story) (2008)
- The Worst Thing She Ever Did (Lost For Words in the U.S.) (2010)
- Writing Tips App for iPhone (co-written with Rich Lowenberg in 2010)
- 40 Things I Want to Tell You (2012)
- Death of Us (2014)
- Violet and Victor Write the Best Ever Bookworm Book (2014)
- Lost and Curious Things (Interactive eBook) (2014)
- 'Ten Minutes' (Short Story) (2015)
- Violet and Victor Write the Most Fabulous Fairytale (2016)
- Secrets of the Badlands (Interactive eBook) (2016)
- Me (and) Me (2017)
- Polly Diamond and the Magic Book (2018)
- Always Smile: Carley Allison's for Laughing, Loving and Living (2019)
- Polly Diamond and the Super Stunning Spectacular School Fair (2019)
- Pia's Plans (2020)
- The World's Worst Parrot (2020)
- Polly Diamond and the Topsy-Turvy Day (2023)
- Dropped! (2024)
- Spark: On Writing for Kids and Young Adults (2024)

== Awards ==
- Life on the Refrigerator Door
  - A New York Public Library "Book for the Teen Age" (US) 2008
  - Winner of the Redbridge Teenage Book Award (UK) 2008
  - Winner of the Sheffield Libraries Choice Book Award (UK) 2008
  - Winner of the Grand Prix de Viarmes (France) 2008
  - Winner of the Prix Livrentête, Prix Livrentête, (France) 2008
  - Winner of the Sweyne Park School Year 7 Book Award (UK) 2008
  - Winner of the Saskatchewan First Book Award (Canada) 2007
  - Shortlisted for the Coventry Inspiration Book Award (UK) 2008
  - Shortlisted for the Oxfordshire Book Awards (UK) 2008
  - Shortlisted for the Salt Lake City County Library System Reader's Choice Award (US) 2008
  - Longlisted for the Carnegie Medal (literary award) (UK) 2008
  - Winner of Saskatchewan Lieutenant Governor's Artists Award for young artists '30 Below' in 2008
- 'You Today'
  - Shortlisted for the Canadian Broadcasting Corporation Literary Awards for Short Stories (Canada) 2009
- Writing Tips App for iPhone (co-written)
  - Number 2 bestselling app in the Educational Apps Listings in US and Canada in 2010
- The Worst Thing She Ever Did
  - Winner of the Arthur Ellis Award, Best Juvenile/YA Crime Book (Canada) 2011
  - White Pine Award of the Ontario Library Association, Official Selection, (Canada) 2011
  - Bank Street College of Education's Best Children's Books of the Year selection (Canada) for 2011
  - The Canadian Children's Book Centre's Best Books for Kids and Teens, 2011 selection
- 40 Things I Want To Tell You
  - Winner of the Saskatchewan Book Award for Young Adult Literature (Canada) 2013
  - Young Adult Honour Book for the Canadian Library Association 2013
  - Shortlisted for the Stellar Book Award - British Columbia's Teen Readers' Choice Award (Canada) 2014/2015 cycle
  - Canadian Broadcasting Corporation's (CBC) list of "100 YA Books That Make you Proud to be Canadian" 2017
- The Death of Us
  - Nominated for the 2015 SaskEnergy Young Adult Literature Award
  - Shortlisted for the Canadian Library Association 2015 Young Adult Book Award
- Me (and) Me
  - Canadian Children's Book Centre Best Books for Kids and Teens 2017
  - Finalist for Saskatchewan book Awards 2018
- Violet and Victor Write The Best Ever Bookworm Book
  - Selected as an Amazon Best Pick for December 2014
  - Included in Book Riot's "Favorite Picture Book Art of 2014"
- Violet and Victor Write the Most Fabulous Fairytale
  - Part of the Winter 2015 Kids' Indie Next List
- Polly Diamond books
  - Chicago Public Library Best Books of the Year 2018
  - Nominated for Beverly Cleary's Children's Choice Award 2021/22

== Theatrical adaptations ==
Life on the Refrigerator Door has been successfully adapted for stage in three languages. It was first adapted and directed by Amy Draper in 2014 at the Yard Theatre in Hackney Wick, London, England, starring Cassandra Bond and Angela Clerkin.

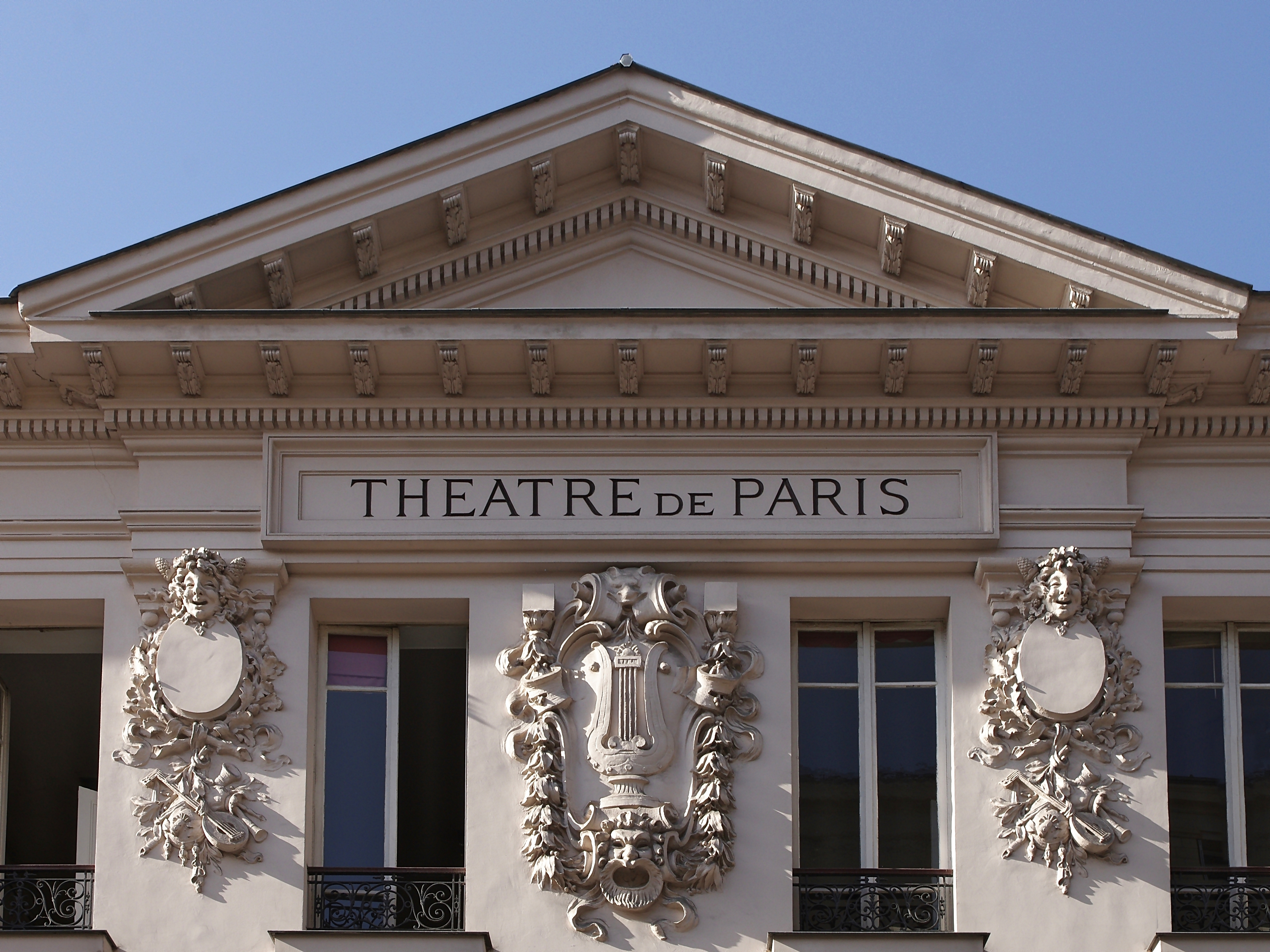
Life on the Refrigerator Door was staged at the venerable Théâtre de Paris in 2016

In March 2016, it was staged in Paris, France under the name Je T'ai Laisse Un Mot Sur Le Frigo at the Théâtre de Paris in the Salle Réjane. The play was adapted and directed by Marie-Pascale Osterrieth and starred Michèle Bernier and Charlotte Gaccio. The building which houses the current Théâtre de Paris was first built in 1730, and later converted to the New Theater in 1891 where the works of playwrights such as Henrik Ibsen have been presented.

The story was staged in Japan in June 2016 under the name Reizōko no Ue no Jinsei at the Sogetsu Hall Theater in Tokyo and at the Hyogo Performing Arts Center in Nishinomiya, Hyogo Prefecture. The adaptation was by Noriko Sanya and the play was directed by Shatama Sakae with music direction by Yasuhiro Kasamatsu.

== Influences ==
In various interviews and Q and A sessions, Kuipers has named Hermann Hesse, Fyodor Dostoyevsky, Emily Brontë, Elizabeth Strout, Valerie Martin, Dr. Seuss, Mo Willems and Louisa May Alcott as having positively influenced her work. In an interview with Novel Matters, Kuipers said the novel she "most loved is called The Glass Bead Game by Hermann Hesse" and that she admired Tennessee Williams' ability to write dialogue.
