= Beatrice and Virgil =

2010 novel by Yann Martel

- Author: Yann Martel
- Language: English
- Genre: Novel
- Publisher: Knopf Canada
- Publication date: April 6, 2010
- Publication place: Canada
- Pages: 224
- ISBN: 0-307-39877-3 (first edition, hardcover)
- Preceded by: Life of Pi
- Followed by: The High Mountains of Portugal

Beatrice and Virgil is Canadian writer Yann Martel's third novel. First published in April 2010, it contains an allegorical tale about representations of the Holocaust. It tells the story of Henry, a novelist, who receives the manuscript of a play in a letter from a reader. Intrigued, Henry traces the letter to a taxidermist, who introduces him to the play's protagonists, two taxidermy animals—Beatrice, a donkey, and Virgil, a monkey.

The Globe and Mail reported that Martel received a $2 million advance from Random House for U.S. rights alone, and that the total advance for worldwide rights was around $3 million, probably the highest ever advance for a single Canadian novel. Martel's earlier novel, Life of Pi, won the 2002 Man Booker Prize for Fiction, and sold seven million copies worldwide.

== References to other works ==
Early on in the story, the protagonist, an author, (some say that the protagonist is a reflection of Yann himself) makes reference to Primo Levi's If This Is a Man; Art Spiegelman's Maus; David Grossman's See Under: Love; Martin Amis's Time's Arrow; George Orwell's Animal Farm; Albert Camus's The Plague; and Pablo Picasso's Guernica.

Extracts are quoted from Flaubert's "The Legend of Saint Julian Hospitator" which is discussed at length. Later in the novel, Jacques the Fatalist by Diderot is later discussed along with Samuel Beckett's Waiting for Godot.

The title is an allusion to two of the main characters in Dante Alighieri's Divine Comedy.

== Reception ==
Reviews were mixed to negative. Michiko Kakutani of the New York Times called the book "as misconceived and offensive as [Life of Pi] was fetching." He accused it of trivializing the Holocaust, and that Martel's attempt to reflect on the event resulted in "a botched and at times cringe-making fable".James Lasdun of The Guardian similarly accused the book of Holocaust trivialization, as well as writing that the book attempts to advocate for Jews and animals, but fails at both.

A positive review came from Michal Hoschander Malen of the Jewish Book Council, who said that the book contained "great wit and wisdom" despite the "most unusual treatment of the Holocaust".
