= Self (novel) =

1996 novel by Yann Martel

- First edition
- Author: Yann Martel
- Cover artist: Keith Ng (photo), Jonathan Howells (design)
- Language: English
- Publisher: Knopf Canada
- Publication date: April 1996
- Publication place: Canada
- Media type: Print (Hardcover)
- Pages: 331 pp
- ISBN: 0-394-28160-8
- OCLC: 35366650
- Preceded by: The Facts Behind the Helsinki Roccamatios
- Followed by: Life of Pi

Self is a novel by Yann Martel. It tells the story of a traveling writer who wakes up one morning to discover that he has become a woman. It was first published by Knopf Canada in 1996.

== Plot summary ==
The narrator, at first male, explains various events from his early childhood, living with a traveling family who finally settle in Ottawa, Ontario. He goes on to explain events from his years in private school (including his parents' death), until he graduates and travels to Portugal, where he, on his eighteenth birthday, wakes up as a female.

Surprisingly unfazed by her transformation, the narrator concludes her trip and begins university back in the fictional Roetown. She begins writing, and keeps travel in her life, eventually visiting such places as Spain and Thailand, to name a few. She shares romances with a select few — males and females alike. Eventually she gets published, and after graduating, moves to Montreal, where she gets a job as a waitress while continuing to write. At her job she meets Tito, her final love. But as the novel is nearing a conclusion, she is suddenly raped by a vicious neighbour in her secluded apartment and her body reverts to being a male again.

== Themes ==
Martel described Self as the crucible of a thematic interest in religious faith that later informed his second work, Life of Pi. Martel also reported in interviews that in writing the book's rape scene he contemplated the relationship between religion and evil: "It made me think about how people live with evil. What interested me in religion is its claim to go beyond the bounds of human existence." Some reviewers noted an autobiographical strand in the book, whose hero is, like Martel, the child of Canadian diplomats and a writer achieving recognition at a young age. It is set partly in Peterborough, Ontario, where Martel was a student at Trent University.

== Critical reception ==
Self was Martel's first novel, and followed the publication in 1993 of The Facts Behind the Helsinki Roccamatios, his first collection of short stories. The novel, in Martel's own words, initially "vanished quickly and quietly", though it was shortlisted for the 21st Chapters/Books In Canada First Novel Award, then Canada's most valuable first-novel award with a prize of 5,000 Canadian dollars.

More critical attention fell upon the book when Martel's second novel, Life of Pi, won the 2002 Man Booker Prize. A reviewer for the Sydney Morning Herald, noting that Martel himself had called the novel "terrible" and expressed a wish that it "disappear", agreed that the work suffered from a "serious crisis of identity", and lacked the power of Life of Pi. The Montreal Mirror went further, calling Self "lame... A pastiche of autobiography and post-modern plot twists, it was haunted by an off-putting tone of smug precociousness." The Toronto Star reviewer objected to Self's protagonist's "self-satisfied air", but praised the work for its deft touch and compelling narrative. A writer in The Independent described the book's handling of gender change as "crude confusion", while The Hindu described the book as "interesting ideas juxtaposed against not-so-inspiring writing".

== Publication history ==
Martel received in 1991 a grant of $18,000 from the Canada Council to write Self, which was published in Canada in 1996, with a British launch the same November.

== See also ==
- Orlando: A Biography, a novel with a similar premise
