= Manners of Dying =

- Directed by: Jeremy Peter Allen
- Screenplay by: Jeremy Peter Allen
- Story by: Yann Martel
- Produced by: Yves Fortin; Gautam Hooja
- Starring: Roy Dupuis; Serge Houde
- Cinematography: James Gray
- Edited by: Jeremy Peter Allen
- Music by: Éric Pfalzgraf
- Release dates: October 31, 2004 (Festival international du cinéma en Abitibi Témiscamingue); October 27, 2005 (Canada)
- Running time: 104 minutes
- Country: Canada
- Language: English

Manners of Dying is a 2004 Canadian drama film based on the short story of the same name (1993) by Yann Martel, winner of the Man Booker Prize for his book, The Life of Pi.

== Plot ==
Kevin Barlow (Roy Dupuis) will die on schedule and according to regulations. Harry Parlington (Serge Houde), director of the Cantos execution facility, intends to make sure of it. However Barlow chooses to go, be it calmly or fighting to the end, Parlington feels confident that he and his team can deal with the situation. When Barlow makes an unusual final request, a strange duel ensues between the condemned man and the prison director. In this struggle there can be no winner or loser, only two men faced with doubts and difficult choices to make.

== Recognition ==
- 2006 Genie Award for Best Achievement in Editing - Jeremy Peter Allen - Nominated
- 2006 Genie Award for Best Achievement in Music - Original Score - Éric Pfalzgraf - Nominated
