= D. G. Jones =

Canadian poet, translator and educator (1929–2016)

Douglas Gordon "D. G." Jones (January 1, 1929 – March 6, 2016) was a Canadian poet, translator and educator.

Born in Bancroft, Ontario, Jones was educated at the private school of Lakefield College School in Ontario, at McGill University and at Queen's University. He received his M.A. from Queen's University in 1954. Jones then taught English literature at the University of Guelph, then Bishop's University and finally the Université de Sherbrooke. In 1969, Jones co-founded the bilingual literary journal Ellipse, which continues to be the only literary periodical in Canada which provides reciprocal translations, in equal measure, of both English and French Canadian poetry.

Jones has been a member of the Arts and Advisory Panel of the Canada Council. His 1978 collection, Under the Thunder the Flowers Light up the Earth, received the 1978 Governor General's Award for Poetry. His rendition of Normand de Bellefeuille's Categorics One, Two and Three received the 1993 Governor General's Award for Translation.

Considered a seminal figure of the mythopoeic strain of Canadian poetry, Jones is also a highly respected essayist and translator. His key work of critical writing is Butterfly on Rock: A Study of Themes and Images in Canadian Literature (1970).

== Bibliography ==
=== Poetry ===
- Frost on the Sun (1957)
- The Sun is Axeman (1961)
- Phrases from Orpheus (1967)
- Under the Thunder the Flowers Light Up the Earth (1977)
- A Throw of Particles (1983)
- Balthazar and Other Poems (1988)
- A Thousand Hooded Eyes (1990)
- The Floating Garden (1995)
- Wild Asterisks in Cloud (1997)
- Grounding Sight (1999)
- The Stream Exposed with All its Stones (2009)
- The Essential D. G. Jones (2016)

=== Criticism ===
- Butterfly on Rock: A Study of Themes and Images in Canadian Literature (1970)

=== Translations ===
- Paul-Marie Lapointe. The Terror of the Snows: Selected Poems (1976)
- Paul-Marie Lapointe. The Fifth Season (1986)
- Normand de Bellefeuille, Categorics One, Two, Three (1992)
- Gaston Miron. Embers and Earth: Selected Poems (1994)
- Émile Martel. For Orchestra and Solo Poet (1996)

== Awards ==
- President's Medal, University of Western Ontario, 1976
- Governor General's Award for Under the Thunder the Flowers Light Up the Earth, 1977
- A.J.M. Smith Award for Poetry, 1977.
- Governor General's Award for Translation Categorics One, Two and Three, 1993.
- A. M. Klein Prize for Poetry, 1989 and 1995.
- Officer of the Order of Canada (O.C.), 2007
