= Army of One =

Army of One may refer to:

- Army of One (recruiting slogan), the former U.S. Army recruiting slogan

== Music ==
- Army of One (album), a 2006 album by Riot
- "Army of One", a song by Phish from the 2004 album Undermind
- "Army of One", a song by Cass Fox from the 2005 Come Here (Cass Fox album)
- "Army of One", a song by Coldplay from the 2015 album A Head Full of Dreams

== Film and television ==
- "The Army of One", an episode of Voltron Force
- "Army of One" (The Sopranos), an episode of The Sopranos
- Joshua Tree (1993 film), a film by Vic Armstrong also known as Army of One
- Army of One (2003 film), a Canadian documentary film directed by Sarah Goodman
- Army of One (2016 film), an American comedy film
- Army of One (2020 film, an American action film

== See also ==
- Army of Me
- One Man Army (disambiguation)
