= Nancy Lee (writer) =

Canadian writer

- Born: 1970 (age 55–56); Cardiff, Wales
- Occupations: short story writer, novelist
- Writing career
- Period: 2003 – present
- Genre: fiction
- Notable works: Dead Girls; The Age

Nancy Lee is a Welsh-born Canadian short story writer and novelist.

== Early life ==
Born in Cardiff, Wales to parents of Chinese and Indian descent, she moved with her family to Vancouver, British Columbia, in childhood.

== Literary career ==
She published her first book of short stories, Dead Girls, in 2003. That book was named book of the year by NOW, and was a finalist for the Ethel Wilson Fiction Prize and the Danuta Gleed Literary Award. The Age, Lee's debut novel, was published by McClelland & Stewart in 2014. Her third work, What Hurts Going Down, is a collection of poems that explore socially ingrained violence and sexual power dynamics, pre- and post- #MeToo movement.

== Teaching career ==
She holds an MFA in creative writing from the University of British Columbia, and is an assistant professor in the creative writing department at University of British Columbia. She has taught in the writing and publishing program at Simon Fraser University and has held a visiting professorship at the University of East Anglia. She was a panelist in the 2003 edition of Canada Reads, defending Yann Martel's novel Life of Pi. In the spring of 2010 she was writer-in-residence at Historic Joy Kogawa House, the writing program that takes place in the childhood home of the author Joy Kogawa (Obasan).

== Works ==
- Dead Girls (2003)
- The Age (2014)
- What Hurts Going Down (2020)
