= The One Man Army (1973 novel) =

Novel by Moacyr Scliar

The One Man Army (Portuguese: O Exército de um Homem Só) is Moacyr Scliar's second novel, published in 1973 and translated into more than ten languages, and presents the saga of Captain Birobidjan, hero of a new world, preacher of utopias, lonely and hopeful navigator of a sea of indifference. Miguel de Cervantes' main book, Don Quixote, inspired the book according to the author himself.

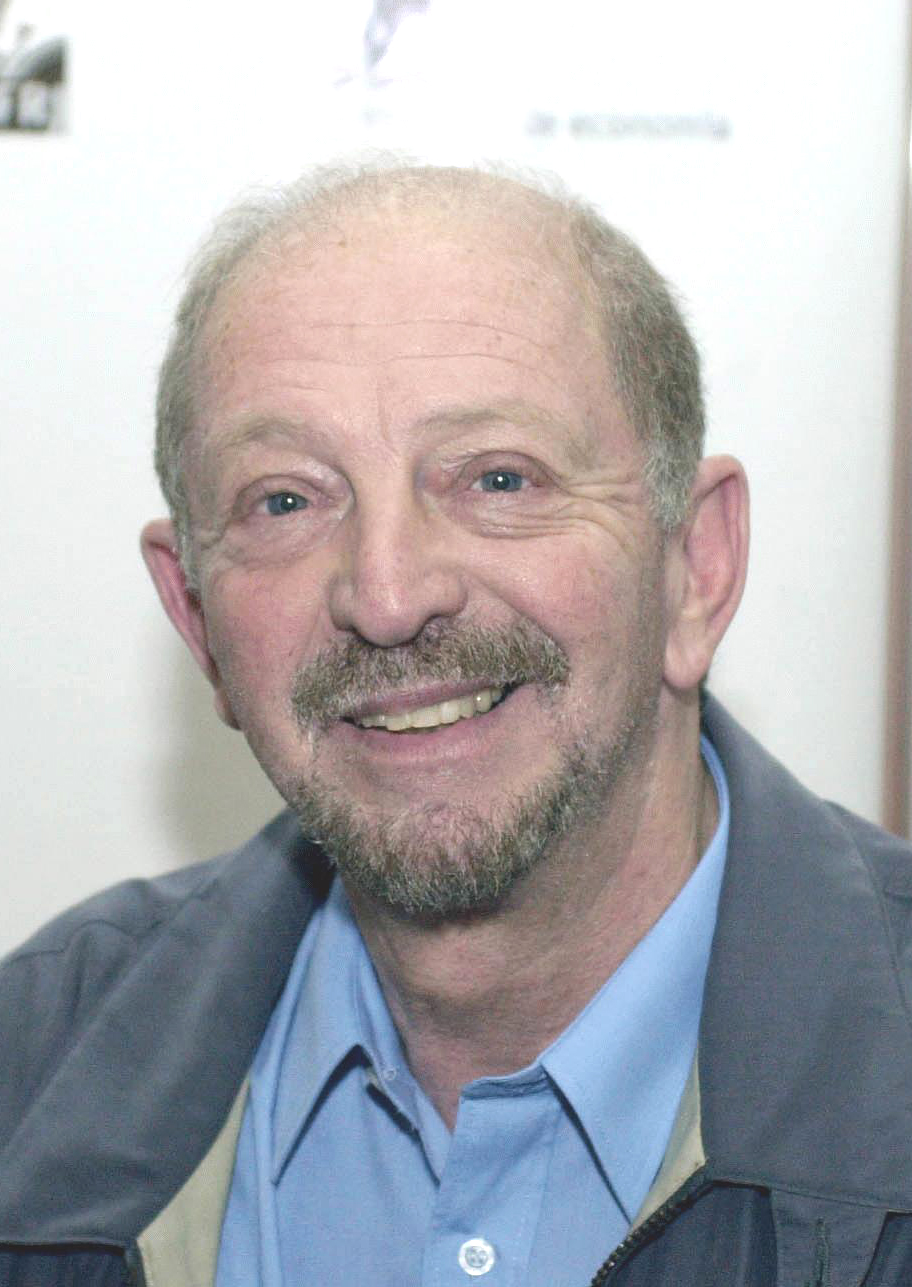
Moacyr Scliar

== Characteristics ==
Moacyr puts in his book the essence of pure heroism, of the utopian efforts of the great men and women of the world, and at the same time highlights the figure who, being so fearless and dreamy, almost succumbs to the reality of the facts. Its protagonist, Captain Birobidjan, is a version of Don Quixote.

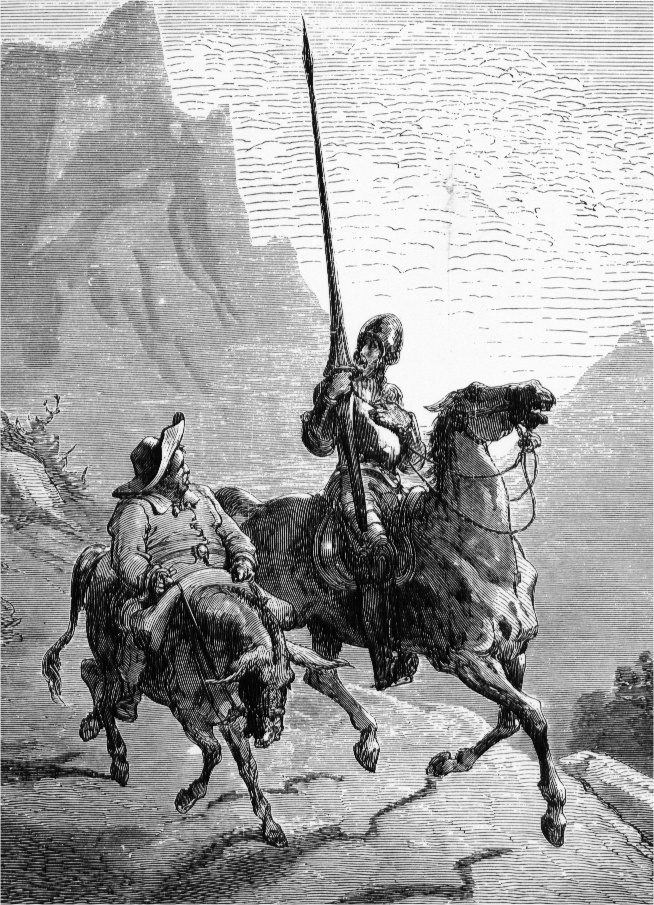
Illustration of Don Quixote and Sancho Panza

== Plot ==
The title character is Mayer 'Capitão Birobidjan' Guiznburg, a Jew who arrived in Brazil as a boy from Russia. Mayer was a Marxist and dreamed of founding a new Birobidjan (Birobidjan was the name of a collective Jewish colony in Russia), a socialist utopia.

In Nova Birobidjan, as he baptizes his land, he starts to live for work accompanied by the Pig Companion, the Goat Companion and the Chicken Companion, the last of which he did not like because he was unproductive. After some time enemies appear, four vagrants who attack after being attacked, and whose collective lover starts to become the second citizen. Later she leaves Nova Birobidjan and Mayer returns home. He retires, after a while he even leaves atheism, and starts to work hard. He switches branches for construction and gets rich, but gets complicated when he becomes the secretary's lover and ends up getting divorced after abandoning her. His company goes bankrupt and he ends up in a pension, where he tries to restart Nova Birobidjan, but ends up failing. Cornered, abandoned, sad, very attached to religion and almost without hope [the little men to whom he was speaking now were only three], Captain Birobidjan has a heart attack when rehearsing a resistance, but as we discovered at the beginning of the book, he survives.
