= Le Quartanier =

Canadian publishing house

Le Quartanier is a francophone publishing house founded in Montreal, Quebec in September 2002 by Éric de Larochellière and Christian Larouche. Le Quarantier distributes its books worldwide but principally in Canada, France and francophone countries.

Originally, Le Quartanier published exclusively exploratory poetry, but has diversified into general poetry, essays and fiction novels divided into four distinct collections:

- Série QR
- Phacochères
- Erres Essais
- La table des matières

The publishing house also launched its house journal "Le Quartanier" from 2003 to 2007. The journal was stopped after publication of seven issues. Le Quartanier then launched OVNI Magazine in 2008, a periodical consecrated to literature, the arts and cinema.

== Authors ==
- Gilles Amalvi
- Ludovic Bablon
- Ariane Bart
- Claude Bernier
- Fabrice Bothereau
- Hervé Bouchard
- Antoine Boute
- Antoine Brea
- Arno Calleja
- André Carpentier
- Philippe Charron
- le collectif Cité Selon
- Éric Clémens
- Loge Cobalt
- Kevin Davies
- Hugo Duchesne
- Alain Farah
- Guillaume Fayard
- Renée Gagnon
- Bertrand Gervais
- Mylène Lauzon
- Bertrand Laverdure
- David Leblanc
- Alban Lefranc
- Pierre Ménard
- F.P. Meny
- Christof Migone
- Marc-Antoine K. Phaneuf
- Patrick Poulin
- Martin Richet
- Jocelyn Robert
- Samuel Rochery
- Steve Savage
- Dauphin Vincent
- Barrett Watten
- Xki Zone
- Christian Zorka
