= One Woman Army =

A one-woman army is a metaphor describing an effective independent woman working alone for a cause against opposition.

One Woman Army may also refer to one of the following:

- "One Woman Army", a song by Ciara from the 2015 album Jackie
- One Woman Army (Porcelain Black song)

== See also ==
- One Man Army (disambiguation)
