= Life of Pi =

2001 novel by Yann Martel

- Life of Pi cover
- Author: Yann Martel
- Original title: Life of Pi
- Language: English
- Genre: Adventure fiction
- Publisher: Knopf Canada
- Publication date: September 11, 2001
- Publication place: Canada
- Pages: 356
- ISBN: 0-676-97376-0 (first edition, hardcover)
- OCLC: 46624335
- Preceded by: Self
- Followed by: Beatrice and Virgil

Life of Pi is a Canadian philosophical novel by Yann Martel published in 2001. The protagonist is Piscine Molitor "Pi" Patel, an Indian boy from Pondicherry, who explores issues of spirituality and metaphysics from an early age. After a shipwreck, he survives 227 days while stranded on a lifeboat in the Pacific Ocean with a Bengal tiger named Richard Parker, raising questions about the nature of reality and how it is perceived and told.

The novel has sold more than ten million copies worldwide. It was rejected by at least five London publishing houses before being accepted by Knopf Canada, which published it in September 2001. Martel won the Man Booker Prize the following year. It was also chosen for CBC Radio's Canada Reads 2003, where it was championed by author Nancy Lee.

The French translation L'Histoire de Pi was chosen in the French CBC version of the contest Le Combat des livres, where it was championed by Louise Forestier. The novel won the 2003 Boeke Prize, a South African novel award. In 2004, it won the Asian/Pacific American Award for Literature in Best Adult Fiction for years 2001–2003. In 2012 it was adapted into a feature film directed by Ang Lee with a screenplay by David Magee.

In 2022, the novel was included on the "Big Jubilee Read" list of 70 books by Commonwealth authors, selected to celebrate the Platinum Jubilee of Elizabeth II.

== Plot ==
The book begins with a note from the author, which is an integral part of the novel. Unusually, the note describes mostly fictional events. It serves to establish and enforce one of the book's main themes: the relativity of truth.

=== Part one ===
In the 1960s, the narrator, Piscine Molitor "Pi" Patel, grows up as the son of the manager of a zoo in Pondicherry. While later recounting his life there, he offers insight on the antagonism of zoos and expresses his thoughts on why animals react less negatively than proponents of the idea suggest.

The narrator describes how he acquired his full name as a tribute to the swimming pool in France. After schoolmates tease him by transforming his first name into "Pissing", he establishes the short form of his name as "Pi" when he starts secondary school. The name, he says, pays tribute to the transcendental number which is the ratio of the circumference of a circle to its diameter.

In recounting his experiences, Pi describes several other unusual situations involving proper names: two visitors to the zoo, one a devout Muslim, and the other a committed atheist, bear identical names; and a 450-pound (200-kilogram) Bengal tiger at the zoo bears the name Richard Parker as the result of a clerical error which switched the tiger's name with the name of his human captor.

One day, Pi and his older brother Ravi are given an impromptu lesson on the dangers of the animals kept at the zoo. It opens with a goat being fed to another tiger, followed by a family tour of the zoo, during which his father explains the aggressive biological features of each animal.

Pi is raised as a Hindu and practices vegetarianism. At the age of fourteen, he investigates Christianity and Islam, and decides to become an adherent of all three religions, much to his parents' dismay (and his religious mentors' frustration), saying he "just wants to love God". He tries to understand God through the lens of each religion, and comes to recognize benefits in each.

A few years later in February 1976, during the period when Indian Prime Minister Indira Gandhi declares "The Emergency", Pi's father decides to sell the zoo and emigrate with his wife and sons to Canada.

=== Part two ===
The second part of the novel begins in July 1977 with Pi's family aboard the Tsimtsum, a Japanese freighter that is transporting animals from their zoo to North America. A few days out of port from Manila, the ship quickly sinks during heavy weather. Pi manages to escape in a small lifeboat, only to learn that the boat also holds a spotted hyena and an injured Grant's zebra; an orangutan named Orange Juice joins them too. Much to the boy's distress, the hyena kills the zebra and then Orange Juice. A tiger has been hiding under the boat's tarpaulin: it is Richard Parker, who had boarded the lifeboat with ambivalent assistance from Pi himself sometime before the hyena attack. Suddenly emerging from his hideaway, Richard Parker kills and eats the hyena.

Frightened, Pi constructs a small raft out of rescue flotation devices, tethers it to the bow of the boat, and makes it his place of retirement. He begins conditioning Richard Parker to take a submissive role by using food as a positive reinforcer, and seasickness as a punishment mechanism, while using a whistle for signals. Soon, Pi asserts himself as the alpha animal and is eventually able to share the boat with his feline companion, admitting in the end that Richard Parker is the one who helped him survive his ordeal.

Pi recounts various events while adrift in the Pacific Ocean. At his lowest point, exposure renders him blind and unable to catch fish. During this period, he encounters another drifting boat with another castaway aboard; however, when they manage to connect their boats together, the other castaway attempts to murder Pi, only to be killed and eaten by Richard Parker. After this, Pi gradually recovers from his temporary blindness.

Sometime later, Pi's boat comes ashore on a floating island network of algae inhabited by hundreds of thousands of meerkats. Soon, Pi and Richard Parker regain strength, but the boy's discovery of the carnivorous nature of the island's plant life forces him to return to the ocean.

Two hundred and twenty-seven days after the ship's sinking, the lifeboat washes onto a beach in Mexico, after which Richard Parker disappears into the nearby jungle without looking back, leaving Pi heartbroken at the abrupt departure without even a farewell.

=== Part three ===
The third part of the novel describes a conversation between Pi and two officials from the Japanese Ministry of Transport, who are conducting an inquiry into the shipwreck. They meet him at the hospital in Mexico where he is recovering. Pi tells them his tale, but the officials reject it as unbelievable. Pi then offers them a second story in which he is adrift on a lifeboat not with zoo animals, but with a Taiwanese sailor with a broken leg, the ship's cook, and his own mother. The cook amputates the sailor's leg for use as fishing bait, and the sailor dies soon after. The mother catches the cook eating the sailor's flesh, and Pi and his mother are disgusted by the cook, but they cooperate with him to survive. However, after Pi fails to catch a turtle, the cook hits him, causing his mother to hit the cook in retaliation. They get into a violent fight, and the cook kills Pi's mother. Soon after, the cook is killed by Pi, who eats him.

The investigators note parallels between the two stories. They soon conclude that the hyena symbolizes the cook, the zebra the sailor, the orangutan Pi's mother, and the tiger represents Pi. Pi points out that neither story can be proven and neither explains the cause of the shipwreck, so he asks the officials which story they prefer: the one without animals or the one with animals. They finally choose the story with the animals. Pi thanks them and says: "And so it goes with God." The investigators then leave and file a report expressing belief in the first story.

== Inspiration ==
Martel said in a 2002 interview with PBS that he was "looking for a story… that would direct my life". He spoke of being lonely and needing direction in his life, and he found that writing the novel met this need.

=== Richard Parker and shipwreck narratives ===
The name Richard Parker for the tiger was inspired by a character in Edgar Allan Poe's nautical adventure novel The Narrative of Arthur Gordon Pym of Nantucket (1838). Richard Parker is a mutineer who is stranded and eventually cannibalized on the hull of an overturned ship, and there is a dog aboard who is named Tiger. Martel also had another occurrence in mind in the famous legal case R v Dudley and Stephens (1884), where a shipwreck again results in the cannibalism of a cabin boy named Richard Parker, this time in a lifeboat. A third Richard Parker drowned in the sinking of the Francis Spaight in 1846, with a cabin boy cannibalized during an incident involving the same ship in 1835. "So many victimized Richard Parkers had to mean something", Martel suggested.

=== Moacyr Scliar ===
Martel has mentioned that a book review of Brazilian author Moacyr Scliar's 1981 novella Max and the Cats accounts in part for his novel's premise. Scliar's story describes a Jewish German refugee crossing the Atlantic Ocean with a jaguar in his boat. Scliar said that he was perplexed that Martel "used the idea without consulting or even informing me," and indicated that he was reviewing the situation before deciding whether to take any action in response. After talking with Martel, Scliar elected not to pursue the matter. A dedication to Scliar "for the spark of life" appears in the author's note of Life of Pi. Literary reviews have described the similarities as superficial between Life of Pi and Max and the Cats. Reviewer Peter Yan wrote: "Reading the two books side-by-side, one realizes how inadequate bald plot summaries are in conveying the unique imaginative impact of each book," and noted that Martel's distinctive narrative structure is not found in Scliar's novella. The themes of the books are also dissimilar, with Max and the Cats being a metaphor for Nazism. In Life of Pi, 211 of 354 pages are devoted to Pi's experience in the lifeboat, compared to 17 of 99 pages in Max and the Cats depicting time spent in a lifeboat.

== Characters ==
=== Piscine Molitor "Pi" Patel ===
He acquires layer after layer of diverse spirituality and brilliantly synthesizes it into a personal belief system and devotional life that is breathtaking in its depth and scope. His youthful exploration into comparative religion culminates in a magnificent epiphany of sorts.

— Phoebe Kate Foster of PopMatters

Piscine Molitor Patel, known to all as just "Pi", is the narrator and protagonist of the novel. He was named after a swimming pool in Paris, despite the fact that neither his mother nor his father particularly liked swimming. The story is told as a narrative from the perspective of a middle-aged Pi, who is now married with a family and living in Canada. At the time of the main events of the story, he was sixteen years old. He recounts the story of his life and his 227-day journey on a lifeboat when the ship he sailed sinks in the middle of the Pacific Ocean during a voyage to North America.

=== Richard Parker ===
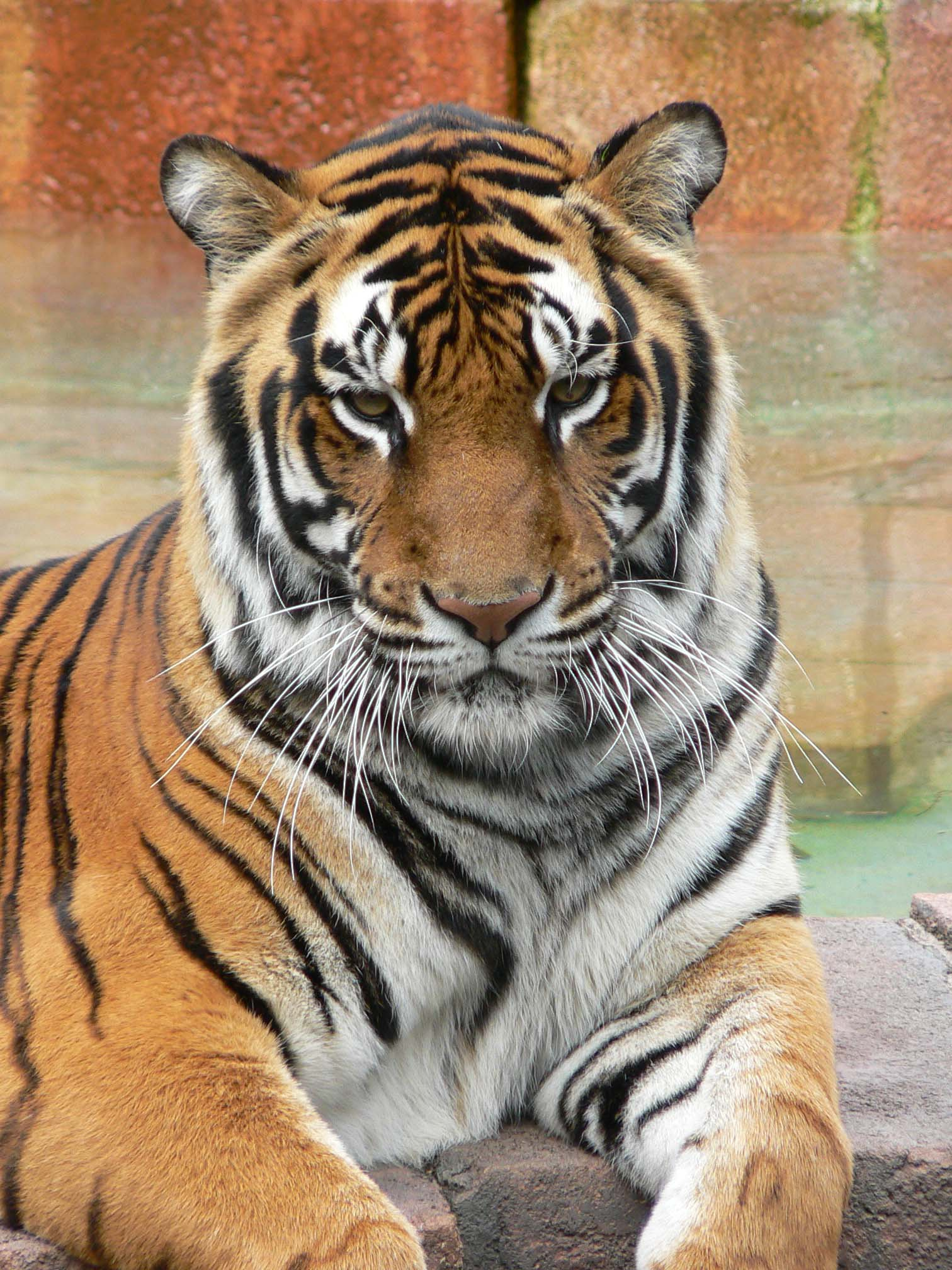
A Bengal tiger

Richard Parker is an adult Bengal tiger who is stranded on the lifeboat with Pi when the ship sinks. Richard Parker lives on the lifeboat with Pi and is kept alive with the food and water Pi delivers. Richard Parker develops a relationship with Pi that allows them to coexist in their struggle.

In the novel, a hunter named Richard Parker is hired to kill a panther that has been terrorising the people of a small village in Bangladesh and thought to have killed seven people within two months. Instead, he accidentally immobilizes a female Bengal tiger with tranquilizer darts while her cub is caught hiding in a bush. Parker names the cub Thirsty after his enthusiasm when drinking from a nearby river. The paperwork that accompanies the shipment of the two tigers to Pi's family's zoo in Pondicherry states that the cub's name is "Richard Parker" and the hunter's given name is "Thirsty" and his surname is "None Given", due to a mix-up with the names. Pi's father finds the story so amusing that they continue to call the tiger "Richard Parker".

== Themes ==
Martel has said that Life of Pi can be summarized in three statements: "Life is a story"; "You can choose your story"; "A story with God is the better story". Reviewer Gordon Houser suggests that there are two main themes of the book: "that all life is interdependent, and that we live and breathe via belief."

== Reception ==
Brian Bethune of Maclean's describes Life of Pi as a "head-scratching combination of dense religious allegory, zoological lore and enthralling adventure tale, written with warmth and grace". Master Plots suggested that the "central themes of Life of Pi concern religion and human faith in God". Reutter said, "So believable is Pi's story telling that readers will be amazed." Gregory Stephens added that it "achieves something more quietly spectacular." Jean Smith stated that there was "no bamboozlement here." Gary Krist of The New York Times praised the book, but added that at times Martel "pushes the didactic agenda of his story too hard."

In 2010, U.S. President Barack Obama wrote a letter directly to Martel, describing Life of Pi as "an elegant proof of God, and the power of storytelling."

== Adaptations ==
=== Illustrated edition ===
The first edition of Life of Pi was illustrated by Andy Bridge. In October 2005, a worldwide competition was launched to find an artist to illustrate Life of Pi. The competition was run by Scottish publisher Canongate Books and UK newspaper The Times, as well as Australian newspaper The Age and Canadian newspaper The Globe and Mail. Croatian artist Tomislav Torjanac was chosen as the illustrator for the new edition, which was published in September 2007.

=== Film adaptation ===
A 2012 adaptation directed by Ang Lee and based on an adapted screenplay by David Magee was given a wide release in the United States on November 21, 2012. At the 85th Academy Awards, it won four awards from eleven nominations, including Best Director.

=== Theatrical adaptations ===
This novel has also been adapted as a play by Keith Robinson, artistic director of the youth-oriented Twisting Yarn Theatre Company. Andy Rashleigh wrote the adaptation, which was directed by Keith Robinson. The premier/original cast contained only six actors – Tony Hasnath (Pi), Taresh Solanki (Richard Parker), Melody Brown (Mother), Conor Alexander (Father), Sanjay Shalat (Brother) and Mark Pearce (Uncle). The play was produced at the Alhambra Theatre in Bradford, England, in 2003. The company toured England and Ireland with the play in 2004 and 2007.

Keith Robinson also directed a second version of the play. He brought some of his company to work with students of the BA (Hons) Drama, Applied Theatre and Education Course at the Central School of Speech and Drama. The joint production was performed at the Minack Theatre, in Cornwall, England, in late June 2008.

A new adaptation by Lolita Chakrabarti premiered at the Crucible Theatre, Sheffield, in June 2019. It was directed by Max Webster, with puppetry and movement directed by Finn Caldwell. Unanimously well received by critics, the play opened in November 2021 at Wyndham's Theatre, West End. In 2022, the production won 5 Olivier Awards including Best New Play, and subsequently extended to October 2022.

== Bibliography ==
- Busby, Brian (2003). Character Parts: Who's Really Who in CanLit. Toronto: Knopf. ISBN 0-676-97579-8.
- Davies, Hugh (September 2002). "£50,000 Booker winner 'stole idea from Brazilian author'". London: Telegraph Group. Archived from the original on January 12, 2022.
- Dwyer, June (2005). "Yann Martel's Life of Pi and the Evolution of the Shipwreck Narrative". Modern Language Studies. 35 (2): 9–21. doi:10.2307/30039823. JSTOR 30039823.
- "May Richard Parker be always at your side". The Guardian. UK. November 2002.
- Fialkoff, Francine (December 2002). "Too Sensitized to Plagiarism?". Library Journal. Archived from the original on November 20, 2005.
- McMurtrie, John (October 2005). "French director swept away by 'Life of Pi'". San Francisco Chronicle. Archived from the original on March 28, 2008.
- Varughese, Samson (February 2013). "Does "The Life of Pi" Prove the existence of God?". TheMinistryRookie.com. Archived from the original on August 12, 2014.
