= Moacyr Scliar =

Brazilian writer and physician (1937–2011)

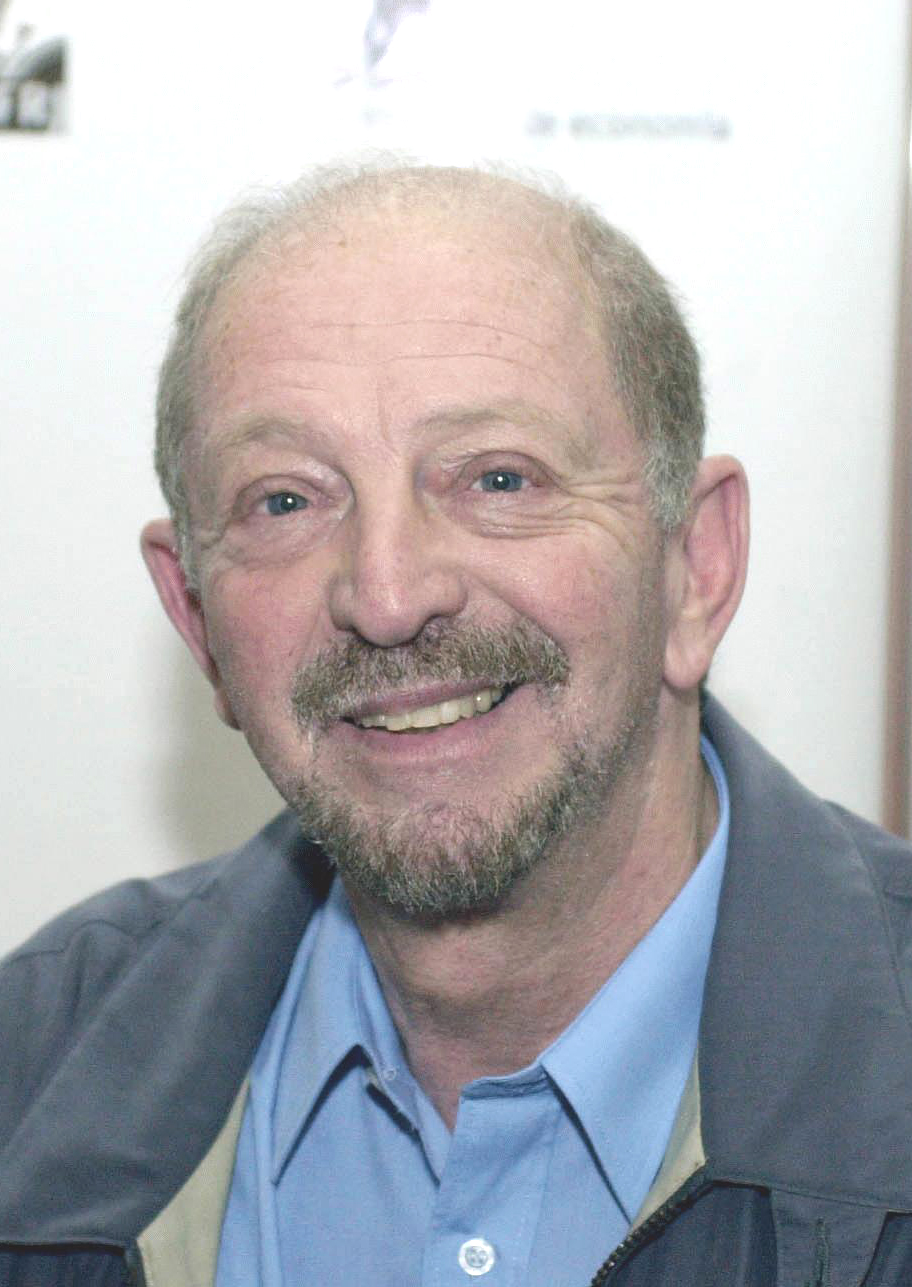
- Born: Moacyr Jaime Scliar; March 23, 1937; Porto Alegre, Rio Grande do Sul
- Died: February 27, 2011 (aged 73); Porto Alegre, Rio Grande do Sul
- Occupations: Writer, physician
- Notable work: Max and the Cats

Moacyr Jaime Scliar (March 23, 1937 – February 27, 2011) was a Brazilian writer and physician. Most of his writing centers on issues of Jewish identity in the Diaspora and particularly on being Jewish in Brazil.

Scliar is best known outside Brazil for his 1981 novel Max and the Cats (Max e os Felinos), the story of a young German man who flees Berlin after he comes to the attention of the Nazis for having had an affair with a married woman. En route to Brazil, his ship sinks, and he finds himself alone in a dinghy with a jaguar who had been travelling in the hold.

== Background ==
Scliar was born in Porto Alegre, Rio Grande do Sul, into a Jewish family that immigrated to Brazil from Bessarabia in 1919. He graduated in medicine in 1962, majoring in public health. He first worked at the Jewish Hospital for the Elderly in Porto Alegre, and later worked in the public health field in tuberculosis prevention and treatment.

== Writing ==
A prolific writer, Scliar published over 100 books in Portuguese, covering various literary genres: short stories; novels; young adult fiction; children's books; and essays.

In 1962, his first book Stories of a Doctor in Training was published, although later on he regretted having published it so young. His second book The Carnival of the Animals was published in 1968.

In a recent autobiographical piece, Scliar discusses his membership of the Jewish, medical, Gaucho, and Brazilian tribes. His novel The Centaur in the Garden was included among the 100 Greatest Works of Modern Jewish Literature by The National Yiddish Book Center. In an interview with Judith Bolton-Fasman published in The Jewish Reader, August 2003, Scliar commented on his use of the centaur as a metaphor: "The centaur is a symbol of the double identity, characteristic of Jews in a country like Brazil. At home, you speak Yiddish, eat gefilte fish, and celebrate Shabbat. But in the streets, you have soccer, samba, and Portuguese. After a while you feel like a centaur."

== Translations ==
Scliar's fiction has been translated into English, Dutch, French, Swedish, German, Spanish, Italian, Hebrew, Czech, Serbian, Georgian, Slovene and Danish. His translated fiction is listed in the UNESCO international bibliography of translations.

== Awards and recognitions ==
- 2003 — Elected a lifetime member of the Brazilian Academy of Letters.
- 2009 São Paulo Prize for Literature — Shortlisted in the Best Book of the Year category for Manual da Paixão Solitária
- 2010 São Paulo Prize for Literature — Chosen to serve as a member of the Final Jury

== Works in English ==
=== Books ===
- The Centaur in the Garden, Translator: Margaret A. Neves
- The Gods of Raquel, Translator: Eloah F. Giacomelli
- The One-Man Army, Translator: Eloah F. Giacomelli
- The Carnival of the Animals, Translator: Eloah F. Giacomelli
- The Ballad of the False Messiah, Translator: Eloah F. Giacomelli
- The Strange Nation of Rafael Mendes, Translator: Eloah F. Giacomelli
- The Volunteers, Translator: Eloah F. Giacomelli
- The Enigmatic Eye, Translator: Eloah F. Giacomelli
- Max and the Cats , Translator: Eloah F. Giacomelli
- The Collected Stories of Moacyr Scliar, Translator: Eloah F. Giacomelli
- The War in Bom Fim, Translator: David William Foster
- Kafka's Leopards, Translator: Thomas O. Beebee
- The Woman Who Wrote the Bible, Translator: Heath Wing

=== Short Stories in Anthologies ===
- Inside My Dirty Head - The Holocaust, translator Eloah F. Giacomelli, in TROPICAL SYNAGOGUES: SHORT STORIES BY JEWISH LATIN AMERICAN WRITERS, editor Ilan Stavans
- The Plagues, translator Eloah F. Giacomelli, in A HAMMOCK BENEATH THE MANGOES - STORIES FROM LATIN AMERICA, editor Thomas Colchie
- Van Gogh's Ear, translator Eloah F. Giacomelli, in THE VINTAGE BOOK OF LATIN AMERICAN STORIES, editors Carlos Fuentes and Julio Ortega
- The Prophets of Benjamin Bok, translator Eloah F. Giacomelli, in WITH SIGNS AND WONDER: AN INTERNATIONAL ANTHOLOGY OF JEWISH FABULIST FICTION, editor Daniel M. Jaffe
- The Ballad of the False Messiah, translator Eloah F. Giacomelli, in THE OXFORD BOOK OF JEWISH STORIES, editor Ilan Stavans
- The Cow; The Last Poor Man, translator Eloah F. Giacomelli, in THE OXFORD ANTHOLOGY OF THE BRAZILIAN SHORT STORY, editor K. David Jackson

== Works in Portuguese ==
=== Books ===
==== Short stories ====
- O carnaval dos animais. Porto Alegre, Movimento, 1968.
- A balada do falso Messias. São Paulo, Ática, 1976.
- Histórias da terra trêmula. São Paulo, Escrita, 1976.
- O anão no televisor. Porto Alegre, Globo, 1979.
- Os melhores contos de Moacyr Scliar. São Paulo, Global, 1984.
- Dez contos escolhidos. Brasília, Horizonte, 1984.
- O olho enigmático. Rio, Guanabara, 1986.
- Contos reunidos. São Paulo, Companhia das Letras, 1995.
- O amante da Madonna. Porto Alegre, Mercado Aberto, 1997.
- Os contistas. Rio, Ediouro, 1997.
- Histórias para (quase) todos os gostos. Porto Alegre, L&PM, 1998.
- Pai e filho, filho e pai. Porto Alegre, L&PM, 2002.
- Histórias que os jornais não contam. Rio de Janeiro, Agir, 2009.

==== Novels ====
- A guerra no Bom Fim. Rio, Expressão e Cultura, 1972. Porto Alegre, L&PM, ISBN 9788525413215.
- O Exército de um Homem Só. Rio, Expressão e Cultura, 1973. Porto Alegre, L&PM, ISBN 852540652X.
- Os deuses de Raquel. Rio, Expressão e Cultura, 1975. Porto Alegre, L&PM, ISBN 85-254-1225-2.
- O ciclo das águas. Porto Alegre, Globo, 1975; Porto Alegre, L&PM, 1996, ISBN 9788574887838.
- Mês de cães danados. Porto Alegre, L&PM, 1977, ISBN 852541221X.
- Doutor Miragem. Porto Alegre, L&PM, 1979, ISBN 8525409219.
- Os voluntários. Porto Alegre, L&PM, 1979, ISBN 8525410667.
- O Centauro no Jardim. Rio, Nova Fronteira, 1980. Porto Alegre, L&PM (Tradução francesa: "Le centaure dans le jardin"), Presses de la Renaissance, Paris, ISBN 2-264-01545-4, 1985.
- Max e os felinos. Porto Alegre, L&PM, 1981, ISBN 8525410489.
- A estranha nação de Rafael Mendes. Porto Alegre, L&PM, 1983, ISBN 8525409367.
- Cenas da vida minúscula. Porto Alegre, L&PM, 1991, ISBN 8525403555.
- Sonhos tropicais. São Paulo, Companhia das Letras, 1992, ISBN 8571642494.
- A majestade do Xingu. São Paulo, Companhia das Letras, 1997, ISBN 8571647011.
- A mulher que escreveu a Bíblia. São Paulo, Companhia das Letras, 1999, ISBN 8571649375.
- Os leopardos de Kafka. São Paulo, Companhia das Letras, 2000, ISBN 9788535900217.
- Uma história farroupilha. Porto Alegre, L&PM, 2004, ISBN 8525414204.
- Na noite do ventre, o diamante. Rio de Janeiro: Ed. Objetiva, 2005, ISBN 8573026790.
- Ciumento de carteirinha Editora Ática, 2006, ISBN 8508101104.
- Os vendilhões do templo Companhia das Letras, 2006, ISBN 9788535908299.
- Manual da paixão solitária. São Paulo: Companhia das Letras, 2008, ISBN 9788535913552.
- Eu vos abraço, milhões. São Paulo: Companhia das Letras, 2010, ISBN 9788535917390.

==== Children and Youth Fiction ====
- Cavalos e obeliscos. Porto Alegre, Mercado Aberto, 1981; São Paulo, Ática, 2001, ISBN 9788508107247.
- A festa no castelo. Porto Alegre, L&PM, 1982, ISBN 8525410403.
- Memórias de um aprendiz de escritor. São Paulo, Cia. Editora Nacional, 1984*, ISBN 8504005674.
- No caminho dos sonhos. São Paulo, FTD, 1988, ISBN 9788508097753.
- O tio que flutuava. São Paulo, Ática, 1988, ISBN 978-85-08-03014-9.
- Os cavalos da República. São Paulo, FTD, 1989, ISBN 978-85-08-09759-3.
- Pra você eu conto. São Paulo, Atual, 1991, ISBN 9788535708738.
- Uma história só pra mim. São Paulo, Atual, 1994, ISBN 8535703381.
- Um sonho no caroço do abacate. São Paulo, Global, 1995, ISBN 8526005111.
- O Rio Grande farroupilha. São Paulo, Ática, 1995, ISBN 8508044771.
- Câmera na mão, o guarani no coração. São Paulo, Ática, 1998, ISBN 8508071760.
- A colina dos suspiros. São Paulo, Moderna, 1999, ISBN 8516023508.
- O livro da medicina. São Paulo, Companhia das Letrinhas, 2000, ISBN 9788574060811.
- O mistério da casa verde. São Paulo, Ática, 2000, ISBN 9788508120666.
- O ataque do comando P.Q. São Paulo, Ática, 2001, ISBN 9788508120581.
- O sertão vai virar mar. São Paulo, Ática, 2002, ISBN 8508120257.
- Aquele estranho colega, o meu pai. São Paulo, Atual, 2002, ISBN 8535702474.
- Éden-Brasil. São Paulo, Companhia das Letras, 2002, ISBN 8535902465.
- O irmão que veio de longe. Idem, idem, ISBN 8574061417.
- Nem uma coisa, nem outra. Rio, Rocco, 2003, ISBN 8532515088.
- Aprendendo a amar – e a curar. São Paulo, Scipione, 2003, ISBN 978-85-262-4988-2.
- Navio das cores. São Paulo, Berlendis & Vertecchia, 2003, ISBN 8586387711.
- Livro de Todos – O Mistério do Texto Roubado. São Paulo, Imprensa Oficial do Estado de São Paulo, 2008. Obra coletiva (Moacyr Scliar e vários autores), ISBN 9788570606129.

==== Chronicles ====
- A massagista japonesa. Porto Alegre, L&PM, 1984.
- Um país chamado infância. Porto Alegre, Sulina, 1989.
- Dicionário do viajante insólito. Porto Alegre, L&PM, 1995.
- Minha mãe não dorme enquanto eu não chegar. Porto Alegre, L&PM, 1996. Artes e Ofícios, 2001.
- O imaginário cotidiano. São Paulo, Global, 2001.
- A língua de três pontas: crônicas e citações sobre a arte de falar mal. Porto Alegre.

==== Essays ====
- A condição judaica. Porto Alegre, L&PM, 1987.
- Do mágico ao social: a trajetória da saúde pública. Porto Alegre, L&PM, 1987; SP, Senac, 2002.
- Cenas médicas. Porto Alegre, Editora da Ufrgs, 1988. Artes&Ofícios, 2002.
- Enígmas da culpa. São Paulo, Objetiva, 2007.

== Bibliography ==
- Florina Florescu, "Of Genes, Mutations, and Desires in Franz Kafka's The Metamorphosis and Moacyr Scliar's The Centaur in the Garden Catalina", in Elizabeth Klaver (ed.), The Body in Medical Culture (Albany (NY), SUNY Press, 2010).
