= Yann Martel =

Canadian novelist (born 1963)

Yann Martel CC
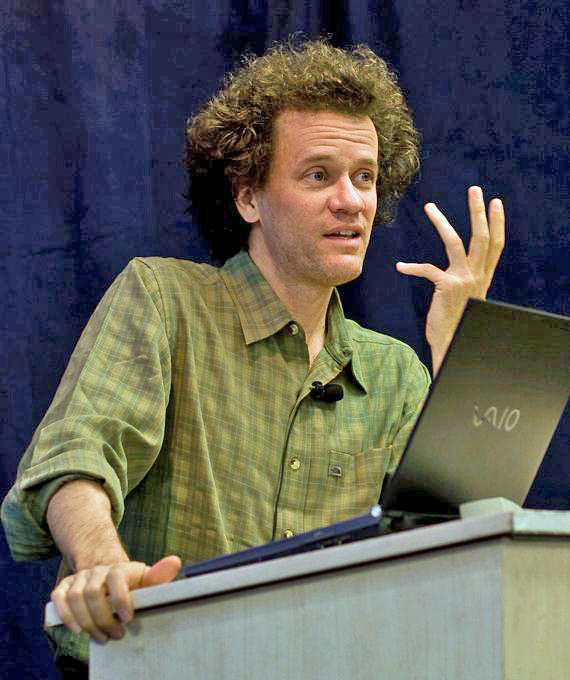
- Martel in 2007
- Born: June 25, 1963 (age 63); Salamanca, Spain
- Education: Trent University
- Occupation: Novelist
- Partner: Alice Kuipers (2002–present)
- Children: 4
- Relatives: Émile Martel (father)
- Writing career
- Period: 1988–present
- Notable works: Life of Pi; Beatrice and Virgil; The High Mountains of Portugal

Signature
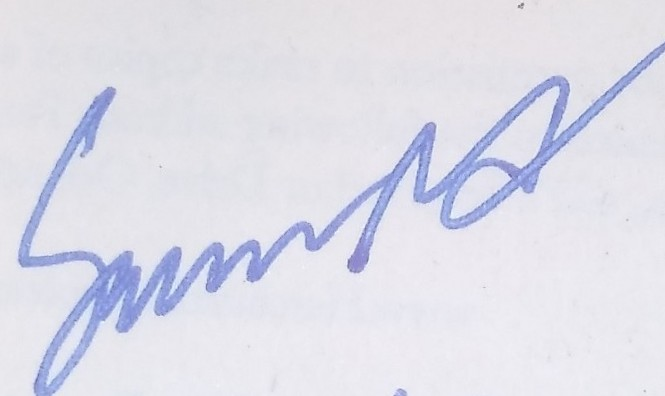

Yann Martel, CC (born June 25, 1963) is a Canadian author who wrote the Man Booker Prize-winning novel Life of Pi, an international bestseller published in more than 50 territories. It has sold more than 12 million copies worldwide and spent more than a year on the bestseller lists of The New York Times and The Globe and Mail, among many other best-selling lists. Life of Pi was adapted for a movie of the same name directed by Ang Lee, receiving four Academy Awards including the Academy Award for Best Director and winning the Golden Globe Award for Best Original Score.

Martel is also the author of the novels The High Mountains of Portugal, Beatrice and Virgil, Son of Nobody, and Self, the collection of stories The Facts Behind the Helsinki Roccamatios, and a collection of letters to Canada's Prime Minister 101 Letters to a Prime Minister. He has won a number of literary prizes, including the 2001 Hugh MacLennan Prize for Fiction and the 2002 Asian/Pacific American Award for Literature.

== Biography ==
Martel was born in Salamanca, Spain, in 1963 to French-Canadians Émile Martel and Nicole Perron who were studying at the University of Salamanca. His mother was enrolled in Hispanic studies while his father was working on a PhD on Spanish writer Miguel de Unamuno. The family moved to Coimbra, Portugal, soon after his birth, then to Madrid, Spain, then to Fairbanks, Alaska, and finally to Victoria, British Columbia; his father taught at the Universities of Alaska and Victoria. His parents joined the Canadian foreign service, and he was raised in San José, Costa Rica; Paris, France; and Madrid, Spain; with stints in Ottawa, Ontario, in between postings.

Martel completed his final two years of high school at Trinity College School in Port Hope, Ontario, and he completed an undergraduate degree in philosophy at Trent University in Peterborough, Ontario.

Martel worked at odd jobs as an adult, including as a parking lot attendant in Ottawa, a dishwasher, in a tree-planting camp in northern Ontario, and a security guard at the Canadian Embassy in Paris. He also travelled through Mexico, South America, Iran, Turkey, and India. He started writing while he was at university, writing plays and short stories that were "blighted by immaturity and dreadful", as he describes them.

Martel lives in Saskatoon, Saskatchewan, with writer Alice Kuipers and their four children. His first language is French, but he writes in English.

In 2026, Martel endorsed Avi Lewis in that year's federal NDP leadership race.

== Career ==
=== Early publications ===
Martel's work first appeared in print in 1988 in The Malahat Review with his short story Mister Ali and the Barrelmaker. The Malahat Review also published in 1990 his short story The Facts Behind the Helsinki Roccamatios, for which he won the 1991 Journey Prize and which was included in the 1991–1992 Pushcart Prize Anthology. In 1992, the Malahat brought out his short story The Time I Heard the Private Donald J. Rankin String Concerto with One Discordant Violin, by the American Composer John Morton, for which he won a National Magazine Award gold. The cultural magazine Border Crossings published his short story Industrial Grandeur in 1993. That same year, a bookstore in Ottawa that hosted Martel for a reading issued a handcrafted, limited edition of some of his stories, Seven Stories.

Martel credits The Canada Council for the Arts for playing a key role in fostering his career, awarding him writing grants in 1991 and 1997. In the author's note of his novel Life of Pi, he thanked them and wrote: "… If we, citizens, do not support our artists, then we sacrifice our imagination on the altar of crude reality and we end up believing in nothing and having worthless dreams."

In 1993, Knopf Canada published a collection of four of Martel's short stories: The Facts Behind the Helsinki Roccamatios, the eponymous story, as well as The Time I Heard the Private Donald J. Rankin String Concerto..., Manners of Dying, and The Vita Aeterna Mirror Company. On first publication, the collection appeared in Canada, the UK, France, Netherlands, Italy, and Germany.

Martel's first novel, Self, appeared in 1996. It was published in Canada, the UK, the Netherlands, and Germany.

=== Life of Pi ===
Martel's second novel Life of Pi, was published on September 11, 2001, and was awarded the Man Booker Prize in 2002, among other awards, and became a bestseller, spending 61 weeks on The New York Times Bestseller List. Martel had been in New York the previous day, leaving on the evening of the 10th for Toronto to make the publication of his novel the next morning. He was inspired in part to write a story about sharing a lifeboat with a wild animal after reading a review of the novella Max and the Cats by Brazilian author Moacyr Scliar in The New York Times Book Review. Martel received some criticism from Brazilian press for failing to consult with Scliar. Martel said that he could not have stolen from a work he had not yet read, and he willingly acknowledged being influenced by the New York Times review of Scliar's work and thanked him in the author's note of Life of Pi. Life of Pi was later chosen for the 2003 edition of CBC Radio's Canada Reads competition, where it was championed by author Nancy Lee. Its French translation, Histoire de Pi, was included in the debut French version of the competition Le combat des livres in 2004, championed by singer Louise Forestier.

=== Later novels ===
Beatrice and Virgil, his third novel, came out in 2010. The work is an allegorical take on the Holocaust, attempting to approach the period not through the lens of historical witness, but through imaginative synthesis. The main characters in the story are a writer, a taxidermist, and two stuffed animals: a red howler monkey and a donkey.

His fourth novel, The High Mountains of Portugal, was published on February 2, 2016. It tells of three characters in Portugal in three different time periods, who cope with love and loss each in their own way. It made The New York Times Bestseller list within the first month of its release.

=== Music ===
He collaborated with Omar Daniel, composer-in-residence at the Royal Conservatory of Music in Toronto, on a piece for piano, string quartet and bass. The composition, You Are Where You Are, is based on text written by Martel, which incorporates parts of cellphone conversations from an ordinary day.

=== Letters to the prime minister ===
From 2007 to 2011, Martel ran a book club with the then Prime Minister of Canada, Stephen Harper, sending the Prime Minister a book every two weeks for four years, a total of more than a hundred novels, plays, poetry collections, graphic novels and children's books. The letters were published as a book in 2012, 101 Letters to a Prime Minister. The Polish magazine Histmag cited him as the inspiration behind their giving of ten books to the Prime Minister Donald Tusk, which had been donated by their publishers and selected by readers of the magazine. Tusk reacted very positively.

=== Teaching and literary service ===
Martel was the Samuel Fischer Visiting Professor at the Institute of Comparative Literature, Free University of Berlin in 2002, where he taught a course titled "The Animal in Literature". He then spent a year in Saskatoon, Saskatchewan, from September 2003 as the Saskatoon Public Library's writer-in-residence.

From 2005 to 2007, Martel was visiting scholar at the University of Saskatchewan.

Martel was invited to be a Fellow of the Royal Society of Literature in 2014. He sat on the Board of Governors of the Saskatoon Public Library from 2010 to 2015.

== Published works ==
- Seven Stories (1993)
- The Facts Behind the Helsinki Roccamatios (Collection of four short stories, including the title story) (1993)
- Self (1996)
- Life of Pi (2001)
  - Schiffbruch mit Tiger: Roman
- We Ate the Children Last (Short story) (2004)
- Beatrice and Virgil (2010)
- 101 Letters to a Prime Minister: The Complete Letters to Stephen Harper (2012) ISBN 9780307402073
  - The first 55 book suggestions are available as What is Stephen Harper Reading? (2009)
- The High Mountains of Portugal (Random House, 2016) ISBN 9780812987034
- Son of Nobody (W.W. Norton, 2026) ISBN 9781324118138

== Awards and accolades ==
=== The High Mountains of Portugal ===
- New York Times Bestseller 2016

=== Beatrice and Virgil ===
- New York Times Bestseller 2010
- Boston Globe Bestseller
- Los Angeles Times Bestseller
- Minneapolis Star Tribune Bestseller
- National No. 1 bestseller in Maclean's
- No. 1 Bestseller in the Toronto Star
- Longlisted for the 2012 International Dublin Literary Award
- Financial Times 2010 Fiction of the Year

=== Life of Pi ===
- Winner of the 2002 Man Booker Prize for Fiction
- New York Times Bestseller List 2002–03 (61 weeks)
- Winner of the Asian/Pacific American Award for Literature 2002
- Winner of the Hugh MacLennan Prize for Fiction 2001
- Winner of The Boeke Prize 2003 (South Africa)
- Winner of the Deutscher Bücherpreis, 2004
- Winner of the La Presse Prix du Grand Public 2003
- Winner in the Scene It Read It category of the Coventry Inspiration Book Awards 2014
- A Quill & Quire Best Book of 2001

=== 'The Facts behind the Helsinki Roccamatios' (short story) ===
- Winner of the 1991 Journey Prize

== Film adaptations ==
- Life of Pi, directed by Ang Lee in 2012 and won multiple awards. Martel makes a brief appearance as an extra, sitting on a park bench across a pond while Irrfan Khan (Pi) and Rafe Spall (playing Yann Martel) converse.
- His short story We Ate the Children Last was adapted as an independent film by Andrew Cividino.
- Manners of Dying, directed by Jeremy Peter Allen in 2004.
- The Facts behind the Helsinki Roccamatios

== Theatrical adaptations ==
- Beatrice and Virgil, adapted by Lindsay Cochrane and directed by Sarah Garton Stanley at the Factory Theatre, Toronto in 2013.
- 'The Facts behind the Helsinki Roccamatios'
- Life of Pi, adapted by Lolita Chakrabarti and directed by Max Webster at the Crucible Theatre in Sheffield. This adaptation uses puppets controlled by the cast to represent the animals from the story. It ran from June 28 to July 20, 2019.

== Influences ==
Martel has said in a number of interviews that Dante's Divine Comedy is the single most impressive book he has ever read. In talking about his most memorable childhood book, he recalls Le Petit Chose by Alphonse Daudet. He said that he read it when he was ten years old, and it was the first time he found a book so heartbreaking that it moved him to tears.

His writing influences include Dante Alighieri, Franz Kafka, Joseph Conrad, Nikolai Gogol, Sinclair Lewis, Moacyr Scliar, Thomas Hardy, Leo Tolstoy, Alphonse Daudet, J.M. Coetzee and Knut Hamsun.

== Personal life ==
Martel had lived in Saskatoon, Saskatchewan for 13 years as of 2016. According to journalist Phil Tank, Martel said he "loves the winters in Saskatoon, but thinks the city remains 'tainted' by racism and hindered by outdated thinking".

Remarking on living in Saskatoon in 2016, Martel said "What I like is Saskatoon has become more diverse. I see that in my children’s school, (...) There’s more visible minorities. There’s more kids from the sub-continent, from India, from Pakistan. More Muslims, more people of African origin, a greater diversity".

== Honours ==

| Ribbon | Description | Notes |
| | Companion of the Order of Canada (C.C.) | Awarded on December 29, 2021, Invested on November 17, 2022.; For his contribution to literature and for his philanthropic commitment to the betterment of his region. |
